= Christine Elliott =

Canadian lawyer and former politician

The Honourable Christine Elliott ECO KC
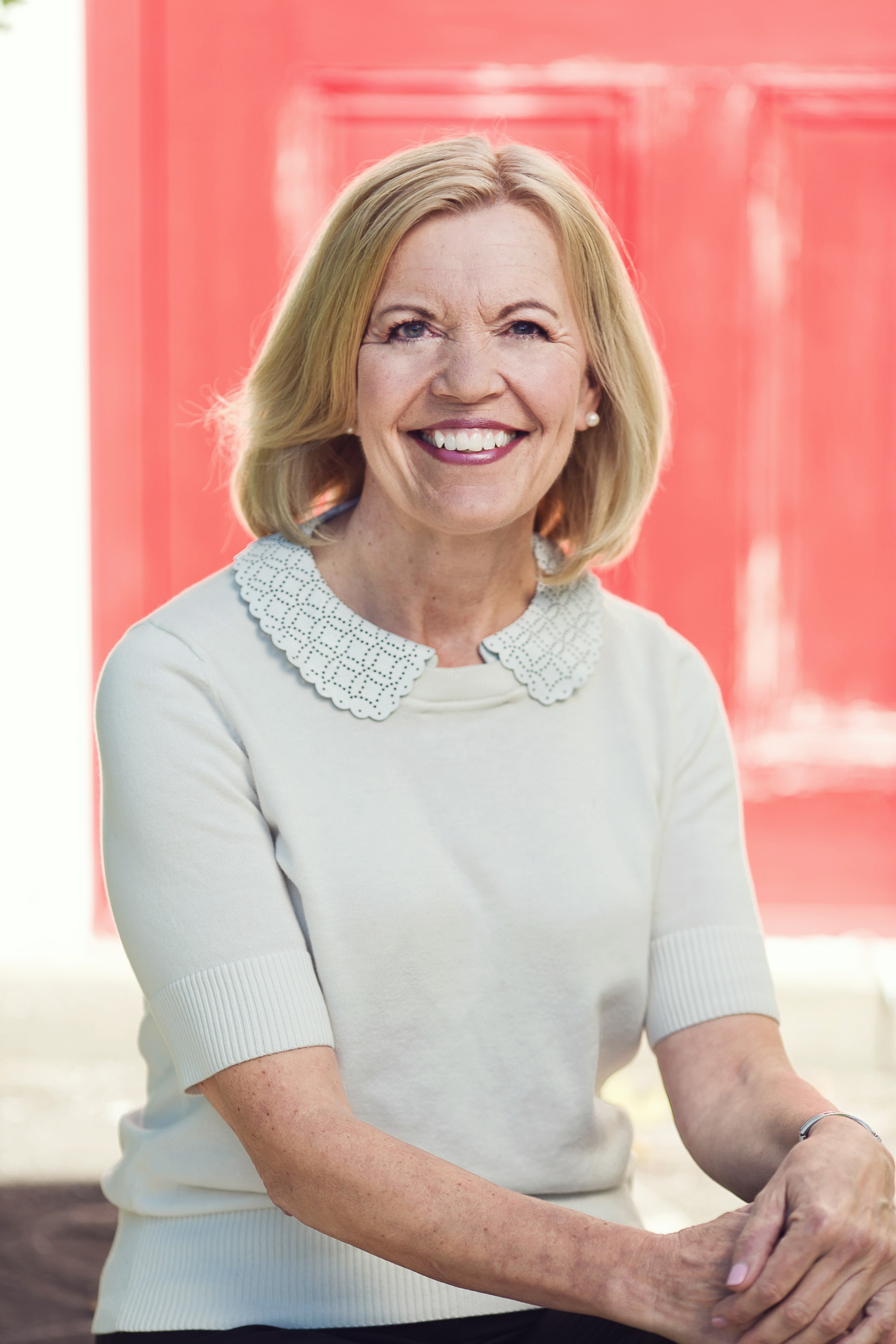
- Elliott in October 2014

11th Deputy Premier of Ontario
- In office June 29, 2018 – June 24, 2022
- Premier: Doug Ford
- Preceded by: Deb Matthews
- Succeeded by: Sylvia Jones

Minister of Health
- In office June 20, 2019 – June 24, 2022
- Premier: Doug Ford
- Preceded by: Herself (Note: as Minister of Health and Long-Term Care)
- Succeeded by: Sylvia Jones

Minister of Health and Long-Term Care
- In office June 29, 2018 – June 20, 2019
- Premier: Doug Ford
- Preceded by: Helena Jaczek
- Succeeded by: Herself (Note: as Minister of Health); Merrilee Fullerton (Note: as Minister of Long-Term Care); Michael Tibollo (Note: as Associate Minister of Mental Health and Addictions)

1st Patient Ombudsman of Ontario
- In office July 1, 2016 – February 1, 2018
- Minister: Eric Hoskins
- Preceded by: Position established
- Succeeded by: Craig Thompson

Member of the Ontario Provincial Parliament
- In office June 7, 2018 – May 3, 2022
- Preceded by: Chris Ballard
- Succeeded by: Dawn Gallagher Murphy
- Constituency: Newmarket—Aurora
- In office October 10, 2007 – August 28, 2015
- Preceded by: Constituency established
- Succeeded by: Lorne Coe
- Constituency: Whitby—Oshawa
- In office March 30, 2006 – October 10, 2007
- Preceded by: Jim Flaherty
- Succeeded by: Constituency abolished
- Constituency: Whitby—Ajax

Personal details
- Born: Christine Janice Elliott; April 13, 1955 (age 71) Oshawa, Ontario, Canada
- Party: Progressive Conservative
- Spouse: Jim Flaherty (m. 1986; died 2014)
- Children: 3
- Education: University of Western Ontario
- Occupation: Lawyer

Christine Janice Elliott ECO KC (born April 13, 1955) is a Canadian lawyer and former politician who served as the 11th deputy premier of Ontario and the Ontario minister of health from 2018 to 2022.

Elliott was elected to represent the riding of Newmarket—Aurora in the 2018 Ontario general election. She is the widow of former Canadian Minister of Finance Jim Flaherty under former Conservative Prime Minister Stephen Harper (2006–2014). Eliott served as Ontario PC Party Deputy Leader from 2009 to 2015 under Tim Hudak. She was the runner-up in both the 2015 and 2018 PC party leadership races and placed third in the 2009 race.

She was a Progressive Conservative member in the Legislative Assembly of Ontario from 2006 to 2015. She represented the ridings of Whitby—Ajax and Whitby—Oshawa, east of Toronto. Elliott was a candidate in the 2009 Progressive Conservative leadership election and came in third place behind winner Tim Hudak and runner-up Frank Klees. She was appointed as the party's deputy leader in 2009. She was a candidate in the 2015 Progressive Conservative leadership election but lost to former federal MP Patrick Brown. Following her second loss, Elliott resigned her seat in the legislature and was appointed as Ontario's first Patient Ombudsman by then-Ontario Minister of Health and Long-Term Care Eric Hoskins, serving until she stepped down to make her third bid for the Ontario PC Party leadership. In that contest, Elliott won the most votes and ridings but lost the contest to Doug Ford. She then received the nomination to run for the riding of Newmarket-Aurora and was elected on June 7, 2018, as the PC Party won the election. She did not stand in the 2022 Ontario general election.

== Background ==
Elliott was born in Oshawa and grew up in Whitby. She attended the University of Western Ontario where she received her honours Bachelor of Arts degree in history. She graduated from Western Law School and received her Bachelor of Laws degree in 1978. She was called to the Ontario Bar in 1980. She started off her career as a bank auditor for one of Canada's largest banks. She was a founding member and partner of the Whitby law firm Flaherty Dow Elliott & McCarthy, where she practised in real estate, corporate/commercial, and estate law.

Elliott received Whitby's Peter Perry Award, an annual recognition of Whitby's outstanding citizen. Prior to that she became a Rotary International Paul Harris Fellow in recognition of her pro bono legal work. She is the co-founder and director of the Abilities Centre (a facility for those with special needs), a director and past chair of Grandview Children's Centre and a director of the Lakeridge Health Whitby Foundation. She was board president of the Durham Mental Health Services (DMHS), which named one of their group homes in her honour (Elliott House). She is a director of Legacy Private Trust and has been a director of the Leukemia & Lymphoma Society and the Toronto Symphony Orchestra.

Elliott was married to former Finance Minister Jim Flaherty until his death on April 10, 2014. She gave birth to their triplet sons John, Galen, and Quinn in 1991. She lived in Whitby with her sons until 2015 when she moved to Toronto to be closer to her job as Patient Ombudsman. Her son Galen worked for Doug Ford, when he was a Toronto city councillor representing Ward 2 Etobicoke North. Elliott and Flaherty have both championed issues surrounding disabled children; their son, John, has a disability.

== Political career ==
In March 2006, Elliott ran successfully as the Progressive Conservative candidate in the provincial riding of Whitby—Ajax in a by-election, replacing her husband who was elected to the federal Parliament. She was re-elected in 2007 in the redistributed riding of Whitby—Oshawa. She was re-elected in 2011 and 2014.

=== PC party leadership bids of 2009 and 2015 and Deputy Leader ===
On April 4, 2009, Elliott entered the leadership race to succeed former leader John Tory. She portrayed herself as a centrist alternative to her three right-wing opponents—Hudak, Klees and Randy Hillier. During her announcement she criticized her main rival Tim Hudak. She said, "He really wants to replicate some of the campaigns and some of the solutions that worked in the 1990s. What happened in 1995 is not the solution for 2009." She said that as leader, she would push for a "sector-by-sector" innovation strategy for Ontario. She also said that she supports nuclear energy and that the Liberal's green energy plan was insufficient for Ontario's needs. At the leadership convention on June 28, 2009, in Markham, Ontario, Elliott placed third in the results behind winner Tim Hudak and runner-up Frank Klees.

Elliott became the party's Deputy Leader from 2009 until her resignation in 2015.

On June 25, 2014, Elliott announced she would seek the leadership of the party for a second time. She had the support of at least nineteen of the twenty-eight caucus members but lost to Brown on May 9, 2015, in a two-person race with 38% of the vote. She resigned her seat in the legislature on August 28, 2015, one week before Brown's election to the provincial parliament.

=== Patient Ombudsman of Ontario ===
On December 10, 2015, she was appointed by Minister of Health and Long-Term Care Eric Hoskins as Ontario's first Patient Ombudsman effective as of July 1, 2016. The duties of the non-partisan position included acting on behalf of patients who have not had their issues resolved through normal complaint resolution processes. She said, "Ensuring that patients in Ontario's health-care system will now have a strengthened voice is a responsibility I am looking forward to taking on."

On February 1, 2018, Elliott resigned as Patient Ombudsman to enter the Ontario PC Party leadership election.

=== 2018 Ontario PC Party leadership bid ===
Elliott officially announced she was running for leadership on February 1, 2018, via Twitter, to replace Patrick Brown who had resigned as leader after sexual misconduct allegations were made against him. Her campaign slogan was "Ready. Now." and her leadership campaign has focused on her experience compared to the other candidates. She stated she supported the "People's Guarantee" (the existing platform adopted by the PC Party in November 2017) with the exception of a carbon tax, which she opposed. She had the most support from the Ontario PC caucus of any leadership candidate in the race. On March 10, she was eliminated on the third and final ballot of the leadership election, which was won by Doug Ford. Elliott had the most votes and had won the most ridings but did not have the most points and therefore came in second. She initially refused to concede to Ford, citing "serious irregularities" in the race and vowed to "investigate the extent of this discrepancy". However, she conceded to Ford the next day and announced her support for him as party leader.

=== Deputy Premier and Minister of Health and Long-Term Care ===
On April 2, 2018, Elliott announced via Twitter her intention to seek the PC candidate nomination for the provincial riding of Newmarket-Aurora. The original PC candidate, Charity McGrath, was disqualified by the PC Party's provincial nomination committee (PNC) amid complaints that she'd signed up riding association members without their knowledge. On March 15, the PNC voted unanimously to bar McGrath from standing for the party in any riding for the 2018 election. Elliott won the election on June 7, 2018, and her party formed a majority government during the 42nd Parliament of Ontario. Premier Ford appointed Elliot appointed to be Deputy Premier and Ministry of Health and Long-Term Care in the Executive Council of Ontario.

On July 26, 2018, under Premier Ford, Elliott increased the provincial mental health budget from $3.8 billion annually by an additional $3.8 billion over a ten-year period (with half of the increase in funds coming from the federal government).

As Minister of Health and Long-Term Care, Elliott sponsored The People's Health Care Act which, in addition to repealing the Lung Health Act, enacted the Connecting Care Act to create a new Crown agency titled Ontario Health intended to merge the 14 Local Health Integration Network and several crown agencies such as Cancer Care Ontario, the Gift of Life Network, eHealth Ontario, HealthForceOntario, and provide the ability for the Minister to create Integrated Care Delivery Systems (or Health Teams) to deliver health care services.

Elliott oversaw the response to the COVID-19 pandemic in Ontario. Elliot was an active member of Doug Ford's Cabinet who provided front line health care workers with financial relief and recognition through pandemic pay.

On March 4, 2022, Elliott announced that she would not seek re-election in the upcoming provincial election.

=== Private Clinic Controversy ===
In November 2023, former health minister Christine Elliott registered to lobby the Ford government on behalf of Clearpoint Health Network, the largest chain of private surgical clinics in Canada. A CBC Toronto investigation revealed that a private clinic, Don Mills Surgical Unit, which is owned by Clearpoint Health Network, received more funding from Christine Elliot's government to perform certain OHIP-covered surgeries than public hospitals performing the same operations did. Freedom of information documents show that during her time as minister, the clinic's annual funding from the province quadrupled.

Adil Shamji, doctor and liberal health critic, complained, "We have a private, for-profit company that is performing the easiest surgeries on the least-complex patients during the most convenient times of the day with the least oversight, yet they get to charge the most to the health-care system (...) And we have the immediate past health minister lobbying the current health minister on behalf of a company that is already profiteering in our health care to allow that company to profiteer even more."

== Electoral record ==
2018 Ontario general election: Newmarket—Aurora
Party	Candidate	Votes	%	±%
Progressive Conservative	Christine Elliott	24,813	47.71	+10.98
New Democratic	Melissa Williams	12,405	23.85	+11.91
Liberal	Chris Ballard	11,840	22.76	–21.36
Green	Michelle Bourdeau	1,859	3.57	–0.47
Independent	Dorian Baxter	447	0.86	–
Trillium	Bob Yaciuk	212	0.41	–
Libertarian	Lori Robbins	192	0.37	–
None of the Above	Denis Van Decker	185	0.36	–
Moderate	Denis Gorlynskiy	60	0.12	–
Total valid votes		52,013	99.01	
Total rejected, unmarked and declined ballots		518	0.99	–0.44
Turnout		52,531	58.97	+5.57
Eligible voters		89,076		
Progressive Conservative notional gain from Liberal		Swing		+16.17
Source: Elections Ontario

2014 Ontario general election: Whitby—Oshawa
Party	Candidate	Votes	%	±%
Progressive Conservative	Christine Elliott	23,985	40.66	−7.51
Liberal	Ajay Krishnan	18,488	31.34	−2.06
New Democratic	Ryan Kelly	13,662	23.16	+7.70
Green	Stacey Leadbetter	2,534	4.30	+2.06
Freedom	Douglas Thom	326	0.55	+0.24
Total valid votes		58,995	100.0	
Progressive Conservative hold		Swing		−2.72
Source: Elections Ontario

2011 Ontario general election: Whitby—Oshawa
Party	Candidate	Votes	%	±%
Progressive Conservative	Christine Elliott	24,499	48.17	+4.16
Liberal	Elizabeth Roy	16,988	33.40	−2.59
New Democratic	Maret Sadem-Thompson	7,865	15.46	+4.34
Green	Bradley Gibson	1,139	2.24	−5.02
Special Needs	Dan King	211	0.41	
Freedom	Douglas Thom	160	0.31	+0.02
Total valid votes		50,862	100.00	
Total rejected, unmarked and declined ballots		154	0.30	-0.22
Turnout		51,016	49.69	-3.84
Eligible voters		102,672		
Progressive Conservative hold		Swing		+3.38
Source(s) "Official return from the records / Rapport des registres officiels - Whitby—Oshawa" (PDF). Elections Ontario. 2011.

2007 Ontario general election: Whitby—Oshawa
Party	Candidate	Votes	%	±%
Progressive Conservative	Christine Elliott	22,694	44.00	−3.12
Liberal	Laura Hammer	18,560	35.99	−1.00
New Democratic	Nigel Moses	5,734	11.12	−1.57
Green	Doug Anderson	3,745	7.26	
Libertarian	Marty Gobin	414	0.80	
Family Coalition	Dale Chilvers	275	0.53	
Freedom	Bill Frampton	152	0.29	
Total valid votes		51,572	100.00	
Total rejected ballots		270	0.52	
Turnout		51,842	53.53	
Eligible voters		96,842		
Progressive Conservative hold		Swing		−1.06

^ Change is from redistributed results.

Ontario provincial by-election, March 30, 2006: Whitby—Ajax Resignation of Jim Flaherty
Party	Candidate	Votes	%	±%
Progressive Conservative	Christine Elliott	15,843	46.23	−2.2
Liberal	Judi Longfield	14,529	42.40	+2.2
New Democratic	Julie Gladman	3,204	9.35	+0.2
Green	Nick Boileau	307	0.90	−1.5
Freedom	Paul McKeever	197	0.57	–
Family Coalition	Victor Carvalho	102	0.30	–
Libertarian	Marty Gobin	87	0.25	–
Total valid votes		34,269	100.00	
Total rejected, unmarked and declined ballots		107	0.31	
Turnout		34,376	32.42	
Eligible voters		106,028		
Progressive Conservative hold		Swing		
Source(s) "SUMMARY OF VALID BALLOTS CAST FOR EACH CANDIDATE - Whitby—Ajax" (PDF). Elections Ontario. 2006.

=== Cabinet posts ===
Ford ministry, Province of Ontario (2018–present)
Cabinet posts (3)
Predecessor	Office	Successor
Deb Matthews	Deputy Premier of Ontario; June 29, 2018–June 24, 2022	Sylvia Jones
Helena Jaczek	Minister of Health and Long-Term Care; June 29, 2018–June 20, 2019	Herself, Merrilee Fullerton and Michael Tibollo
Herself (Note: as Minister of Health and Long-Term Care)	Minister of Health; June 20, 2019-June 24, 2022	Sylvia Jones
