= Patient Ombudsman =

- Ombudsman des patients

Office overview
- Formed: 15 December 2015; 10 years ago
- Type: Ombudsman
- Jurisdiction: Public hospitals, long-term care homes, and home and community care coordinated by the Local Health Integration Networks
- Headquarters: 393 University Ave., Suite 1801, Toronto, Ontario
- Motto: "Every experience matters"
- Office executives: Craig Thompson, Patient Ombudsman; Michelle Rossi, Executive Director
- Parent Office: Ontario Health (agency)
- Key document: Excellent Care for All Act
- Website: patientombudsman.ca

The Patient Ombudsman (French: Ombudsman des patients) is an ombudsman office which acts as a neutral body of last resort for complaints about the healthcare system in Ontario, Canada. The Patient Ombudsman has jurisdiction over public hospitals and long-term care homes, as well as home and community care formerly coordinated by the Local Health Integration Networks (LHINs), now under Ontario Health since 2019.

The position was created in 2015 through amendments to the Excellent Care for All Act, 2010. In the office's first year, it received 2,000 complaints. The bulk of complaints were about Ontario's hospitals. The office received 2,300 complaints in its second year of operations. In 2023 the mandate of the Patient Ombudsman was expanded to include Community Surgical and Diagnostic Centres.

== Parent agency ==
Unlike the Ontario Ombudsman, the Patient Ombudsman is not an independent officer of the Legislative Assembly of Ontario; The Patient Ombudsman's office was under the jurisdiction of the Ministry of Health's advisory agency Health Quality Ontario. When Health Quality Ontario was transferred to the new agency Ontario Health, the patient ombudsman was transferred with it.

== COVID-19 ==
Amid the COVID-19 pandemic in Ontario, Ombudsman Cathy Fooks released a series of recommendations to deal with the pandemic in long-term care homes, such as better whistle-blower protections, communications and visitation systems.

The recommendations were:

1. Backstops and contingency plans for all health care providers
2. A change in approach to visitation
3. Dedicated resources for communication
4. Enhanced whistleblower protection

== List of Patient Ombudspersons ==
- Christine Elliott (1 July 2016 – 1 February 2018)
- Craig Thompson (1 February 2018 – 12 July 2020), executive director managing day-to-day operations
- Cathy Fooks (13 July 2020 - December 2020), died in an accident shortly after appointment
- Craig Thompson (29 March 2021 – present)
