= HFO =

HFO may refer to:

- HealthForceOntario
- Heavy fuel oil
- Hybrid fibre-optic
- Hydrofluoroolefin, a refrigerant
- Hydrous ferric oxides
- Hypofluorous acid
- Halbleiterwerk Frankfurt (Oder)
- High-frequency oscillations
- Hardy Family Office, a professional wrestling stable led by Matt Hardy
