= List of Ontario health topics =

- Ontario Health, a so-called "super agency".
- Ontario Health Insurance Plan, for information about Health services in Ontario.
- Public Health Ontario, an advisory government agency.
- Ministry of Health (Ontario), Ontario Health's parent organization.
