= Warnervale Airport =

Warnervale Airport Warnervale Aerodrome
- IATA: none; ICAO: YWVA

Summary
- Airport type: Public
- Owner: Central Coast Aero Club
- Operator: Central Coast Council
- Serves: Central Coast
- Location: Warnervale, New South Wales
- Coordinates: 33°14′27″S 151°25′40″E
- Website: www.ccac.com.au

Map
- Location in New South Wales

Runways
Direction	Length		Surface
Direction	m	ft	Surface
02/20	1,200	3,937	Paved
- Sources: AIP and Central Coast Aero Club and Central Coast Airport Masterplan

Warnervale Airport (ICAO: YWVA), also known as Warnervale Aerodrome or Central Coast Airport, is located in Warnervale, a town in New South Wales, Australia. It is operated by Central Coast Council in Wyong, New South Wales. This unlicensed general aviation airport contains one runway designated 02/20 which is 1,200 m (3,937 ft) long and is 25ft AMSL. There have also been many plans over the years to expand Warnervale Airport, the Central Coast Council has adopted the Central Coast Airport Masterplan as of 25 February 2025.

The airport is about a 1-hour 45 minute drive north of Sydney and around 40 minutes south of Newcastle, 1 km (0.6 mi) east of the Pacific Motorway. Access is via Jack Grant Avenue (off Sparks Road).

Central Coast Aero Club operates as both a CASA-approved flight training organisation and a not-for-profit aero club out of Warnervale Airport.

== Australian Air League ==
Warnervale Aerodrome is the current base of the Australian Air League Toukley Squadron. Parade nights are held weekly.

== See also ==
- List of airports in New South Wales
