= Excellent Care for All Act =

Ontario, Canada statute

Legislative Assembly of Ontario
- Long title: An Act respecting the care provided by health care organizations
- Citation: Excellent Care for All Act
- Assented to: June 8, 2010

Legislative history
- Bill citation: Bill 46
- Introduced by: Deb Matthews, Minister of Health
- First reading: 3 May 2010
- Second reading: May 12, 2010
- Third reading: June 3, 2010
- Status: Current legislation

The Excellent Care for All Act, 2010 is a law passed by the Ontario Legislature which attempts to make the health care sector more accountable to its patients.

== Provisions ==
The Act focused on Ontario patients and the importance of high-quality patient health care. The act stipulates a number of requirements that all healthcare organizations must follow. This includes the maintenance of an active quality committee, performing an annual survey of staff and patients, and linking executive salary to the attainment of quality-improvement targets. The Act also created the Office of the Patient Ombudsman.

Legislators believe that these provisions will make the health care sector more accountable to its patients.

== Health Quality Ontario ==
Incorporated under the name, Ontario Health Quality Council, Health Quality Ontario was originally incorporated pursuant to the Commitment to the Future of Medicare Act, 2004.

The Excellent Care for All Act continued the council. In 2011, 5 organizations were merged into the council. They are:

- Medical Advisory Secretariat of the Ministry of Health and Long-Term Care
- Ontario Health Technology Advisory Committee
- Ontario Health Technology Evaluation Fund
- Centre for Healthcare Quality Improvement
- Quality Improvement and Innovation Partnership.

The council began operating under the name Health Quality Ontario after the merger.

The Excellent Care for All Act expanded the mandate of the Health Quality Ontario to take a more active role in the adoption of standards of care in the health sector. It also expanded its focus towards quality improvement and patient experience in the health care sector.

Health Quality Ontario was a government agency responsible for monitoring quality indicators of the health care system in Ontario. It was dissolved and consolidated with Ontario Health.

Health Quality Ontario employed the Patient Ombudsman before it was dissolved.

== Patient Ombudsman ==
The Patient Ombudsman (French: Ombudsman des patients) is an ombudsman office which acts as a neutral body of last resort for complaints about the healthcare system in Ontario, Canada. The Patient Ombudsman has jurisdiction over public hospitals and long-term care homes, as well as home and community care coordinated by the Local Health Integration Networks (LHINs).
