= Newmarket—Aurora =

Newmarket—Aurora could refer to:

- Newmarket—Aurora (federal electoral district)
- Newmarket—Aurora (provincial electoral district)
