= CCAC =

CCAC may refer to:

- Canadian Council on Animal Care
- California College of Arts and Crafts
- Chicagoland Collegiate Athletic Conference, an athletic conference affiliated with the National Association of Intercollegiate Athletics (NAIA)
- Community care access centres, a former type of charity in the Canadian province of Ontario.
- Community Circus Arts Corporation
- Community College of Allegheny County, Pittsburgh, Pennsylvania
- Comissariado contra a Corrupção, Commission Against Corruption (Macau)
- Citizens Coinage Advisory Committee
- Climate and Clean Air Coalition to Reduce Short-Lived Climate Pollutants
- Changi Coast Adventure Centre (Singapore)
