= OHT =

OHT or oht may refer to:

- OHT - PAF Base Kohat, Pakistan (IATA code)
- oht - Old Hittite language (ISO 639-3 code)
- Ontario Health Team, a group of Health Care providers in Ontario, Canada.
