= CCAM =

CCAM may refer to:

- Certified Community Association Manager
- Classification Commune des Actes Médicaux
- Congenital cystic adenomatoid malformation, now known as congenital pulmonary airway malformation (CPAM)
- cCam, a camera capture program that runs on Nokia S60 phones
- Center for research on Children, Adolescents, and the Media at the University of Amsterdam, the Netherlands
- Commonwealth Center for Advanced Manufacturing, a university-corporate collaborative research institution in Prince George County, Virginia
- Cooperative Connected and Automated Mobility, a branch of intelligent transportation systems
