= Vaughan—Woodbridge =

Vaughan—Woodbridge could refer to:

- Vaughan—Woodbridge (federal electoral district)
- Vaughan—Woodbridge (provincial electoral district)
