= Eva Grunfeld =

Canadian physician and cancer care researcher

- Education: McMaster University (MD), University of Oxford (DPhil)
- Occupations: Family physician, health services researcher, academic
- Known for: Research on the role of primary care across the cancer continuum; cancer survivorship and follow-up care
- Awards: Officer of the Order of Canada; Lifetime Achievement Award, Foundation for Advancing Family Medicine

Eva Grunfeld, OC is a Canadian family physician and health services researcher. She is the Giblon Professor and Vice-Chair (Research) in the Department of Family and Community Medicine at the University of Toronto, and Director of Knowledge Translation Research in the joint Ontario Institute for Cancer Research and Cancer Care Ontario Health Services Research Program. She is internationally recognised as a pioneer of primary care oncology and is noted for research on the role of primary care across the cancer continuum, cancer survivorship, and the integration of cancer care.

== Early life and education ==
Grunfeld earned her medical degree (MD) from McMaster University and a DPhil in epidemiology from the University of Oxford. She is a Fellow of the College of Family Physicians of Canada (FCFP).

== Academic and research career ==
=== Oxford and early research ===
Grunfeld began her research career at the University of Oxford, in the Department of Public Health and Primary Care, where she conducted some of the earliest randomised research on the role of general practitioners in cancer follow-up. A randomised controlled trial she led, published in BMJ in 1996, found that routine follow-up of women with breast cancer in remission could be transferred from hospital to primary care without increasing time to diagnosis of recurrence or reducing quality of life.

=== Cancer Care Nova Scotia and Dalhousie University ===
Grunfeld subsequently held appointments at Dalhousie University and Cancer Care Nova Scotia in Halifax. While based there she led a Canadian multicentre randomised controlled trial, published in the Journal of Clinical Oncology in 2006, comparing long-term follow-up of early-stage breast cancer by family physicians with follow-up by cancer specialists; the trial found no significant difference in serious clinical events or quality of life between the two models of care.

=== University of Toronto and Ontario Institute for Cancer Research ===
Grunfeld is a professor in the Department of Family and Community Medicine at the University of Toronto, where she holds the Giblon Professorship in Family Medicine Research and serves as Vice-Chair (Research). She is also a professor in the Dalla Lana School of Public Health and the Institute of Health Policy, Management and Evaluation. She is a clinician scientist at the Ontario Institute for Cancer Research and Director of Knowledge Translation Research in its joint Health Services Research Program with Cancer Care Ontario.

== Research ==
Grunfeld's research evaluates access to, and the quality of, cancer care across the cancer control continuum, from screening through to end-of-life care, with a particular emphasis on the role of family physicians. She has led several multicentre randomised controlled trials on cancer follow-up and survivorship that have informed clinical practice guidelines. She has also written on the interface between primary care and oncology specialty care across treatment and survivorship.

She leads two major national research programs: CanIMPACT (Canadian Team to Improve Community-Based Cancer Care Along the Continuum), which develops and tests strategies to improve coordination between primary care and oncology; and the BETTER Program, which develops and evaluates approaches to the prevention of and screening for cancer and other chronic diseases in family practice.

== Honours and recognition ==
- Officer of the Order of Canada (2022), recognised for her work translating evidence into practice to improve family medicine services for people with cancer.
- Lifetime Achievement Award, Foundation for Advancing Family Medicine.
- Inaugural Chair of the Institute Advisory Board on Chronic Conditions, Canadian Institutes of Health Research (2016).
