= Archie Campbell (judge) =

Canadian judge

Archie Gray Campbell (13 April 1942 – 17 April 2007) was a former Justice of the Superior Court of Ontario and the lower Ontario Court.

== Biography ==
Born in Montreal, Quebec, Campbell graduated from Osgoode Hall Law School in 1967. He worked at the Attorney General of Ontario's office as appeal counsel for the attorney general and as deputy attorney general. He later was senior policy advisor to the current Chief Justice of the Superior Court of Ontario Roy McMurtry. Outside of the AG office, Campbell worked briefly at the Parkdale Legal Clinic in 1977 and taught at Osgoode Hall. He was appointed to the bench in 1986.

Campbell's notable contributions included a 1995 inquiry into the police investigation of Paul Bernardo's crimes and the 2003 SARS Commission inquiry.

Campbell died of cancer and degenerative lung disease on 17 April 2007 in Toronto.

== SARS Commission ==
In Canada, health-care workers made up 43 per cent of 2003 SARS epidemic cases. An inquiry was called by then-Premier Ernie Eves who selected Campbell to be the Chairman. The SARS Commission report can be found in the Archives of Ontario, and has five volumes. In total, more than 2000 pages were written by Campbell and his staff. Campbell was selected from amongst the supernumerary justices of Ontario on 10 June 2003 by the government of Ernie Eves, whose Conservative colleagues held the legislature at the time of the inquiry's formation and indeed the SARS epidemic itself, which had hit the shores of Toronto on 23 February 2003.

In his final report, Campbell fixed a list of Thirteen Essential Questions, which are enumerated below:

1. Why Does SARS Matter Today?
2. How Bad Was SARS?
3. What Went Right?
4. What Went Wrong?
5. Were Precautions Relaxed Too Soon?
6. Who Is There to Blame?
7. Was Information Withheld?
8. Did Politics Intrude?
9. Was SARS I Preventable?
10. Was SARS II Preventable?
11. Were Health Workers Adequately Protected?
12. Are We Safer Now?
13. What Must Be Done?

Campbell issued a large number of recommendations: by some counts 92.

== See also ==
- Walker Panel - aka Ontario "Expert Panel on SARS and Infectious Disease Control"
- COVID-19 in Canada
