= Patti Valkenburg =

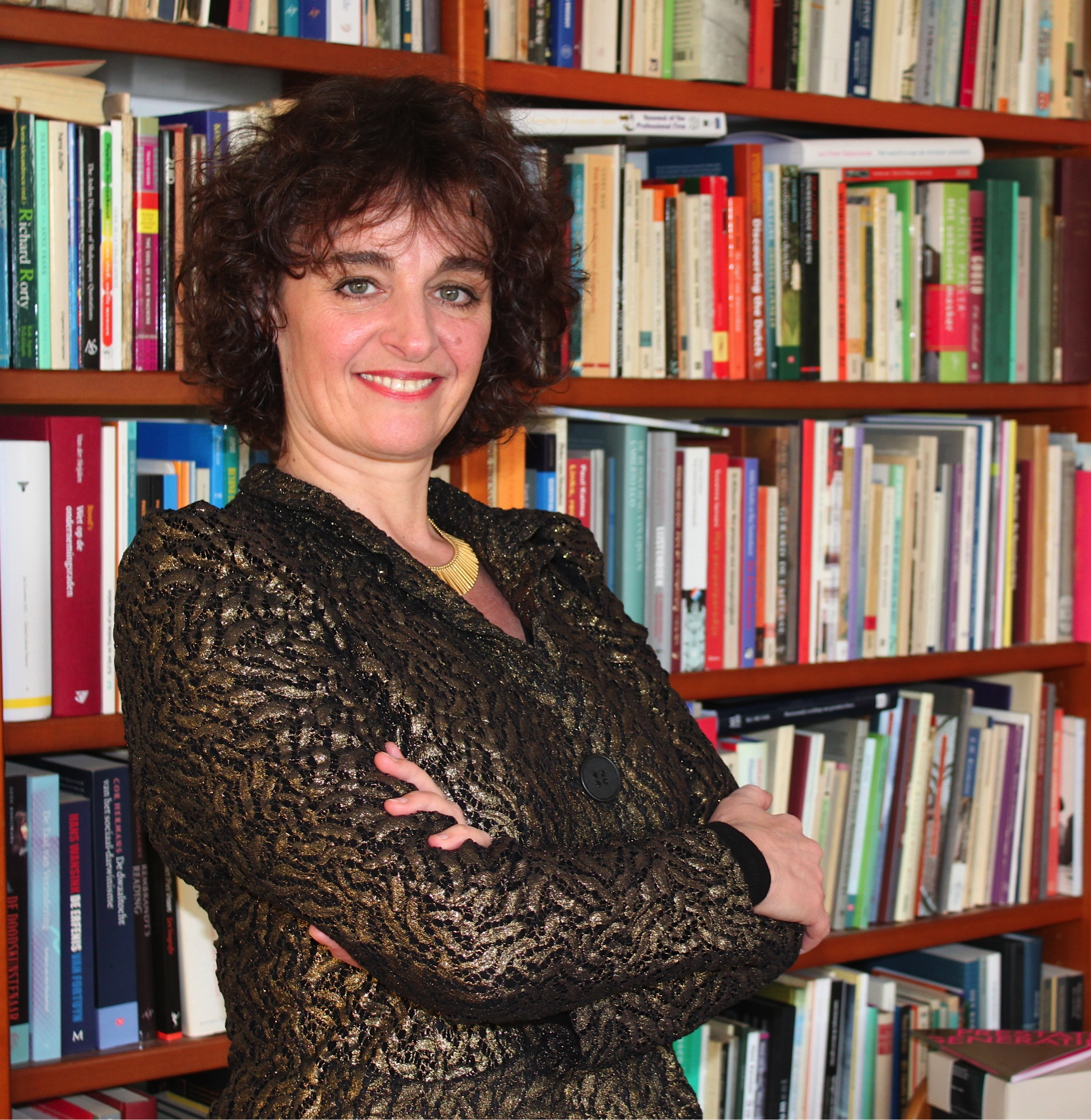
Patti Valkenburg

Patricia Maria (Patti) Valkenburg (born 19 August 1958, Delft) is a Distinguished Professor of Communication at the University of Amsterdam. She is the founder and director of Center for research on Children, Adolescents, and the Media (CCAM). She is a fellow of the International Communication Association. In 2011, she received the Spinoza Prize, the highest Dutch award in science.

== Biography ==
Valkenburg received her MSc (1992, cum laude) and PhD (1995, cum laude) from Leiden University, the Netherlands. In 2006, she was recognized as the most productive communication scientist in Europe. She has published over 100 peer-reviewed articles, 5 solo-authored books, and 35 book chapters. In 2010 she received an Advanced Investigator grant (2.5 million euro) from the European Research Council, which is the highest European scientific recognition. In 2011, she was awarded the Spinoza Prize. The winners of this prize receive a small statue of Baruch Spinoza and 2.5 million euro to spend on research of their own choice.

Since 2011 Valkenburg is member of the Royal Netherlands Academy of Arts and Sciences.

== CCAM ==
Valkenburg is the founder and chair of the Center for research on Children, Adolescents, and the Media (CCAM), which hosts 22 researchers from nine social and behavioral sciences. In 2009, researchers in CCAM initiated a well-evaluated international master program Youth and Media. Valkenburg is associate editor of Human Communication Research and a member of the editorial boards of most other journals in her field. She is the founder of the first international academic division Children, Adolescents, and the Media within the International Communication Association.

== Research and intellectual interests ==
Valkenburg’s research interests include the cognitive, emotional, and social effects of media and technologies on children and adolescents. Her work has focused on all kinds of media contents and technologies, including advertising, pornography, media violence, and social media. Based on dozens of empirical studies she has developed several models to understand why media have small effects on some children but large and long-lasting effects on other children, which children are particularly susceptible to media effects, and how negative media effects can be minimized or counteracted.
