= Lorne Coe =

Canadian politician

Lorne Coe MPP
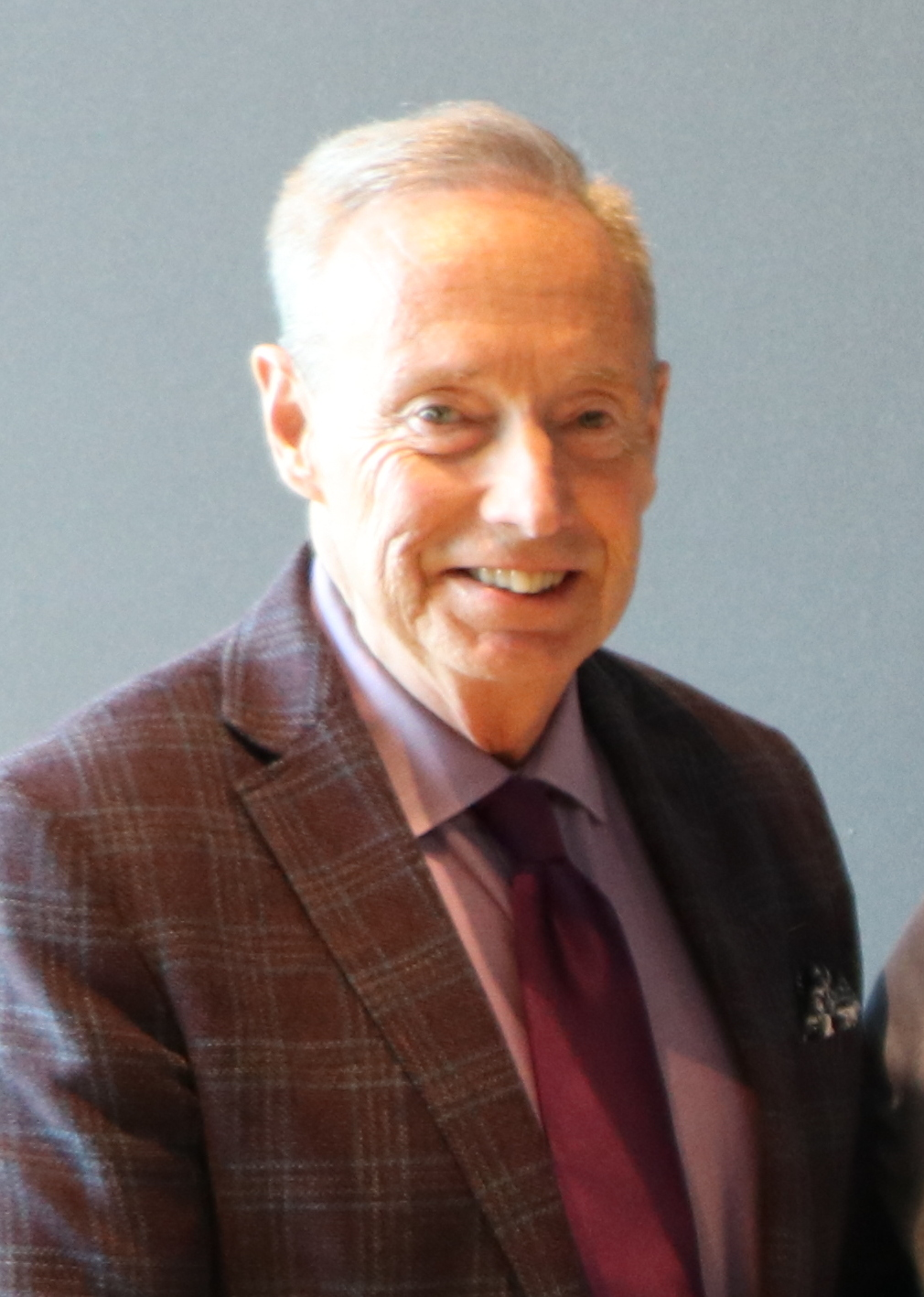
- Coe in 2023

Government Chief Whip
- In office November 5, 2018 – June 30, 2022
- Premier: Doug Ford
- Preceded by: Bill Walker
- Succeeded by: Ross Romano

Member of the Ontario Provincial Parliament for Whitby Whitby—Oshawa (2016-2018)
- Incumbent
- Assumed office February 11, 2016
- Preceded by: Christine Elliott

Durham Regional Councillor
- In office December 1, 2010 – February 11, 2016
- Preceded by: Gerry Emm
- Succeeded by: Derrick Gleed
- Constituency: Whitby

Personal details
- Born: October 5, 1949 (age 77) Montreal, Quebec
- Party: Progressive Conservative

Lorne Earle Coe MPP (born October 5, 1949) is a politician in Ontario, Canada. He is a Progressive Conservative member of the Legislative Assembly of Ontario who represents the riding of Whitby and was first elected in a by-election held on 11 February 2016. Coe was elected with 52% of the vote compared to 28% for his closest rival, Elizabeth Roy of the Ontario Liberal Party. Coe served on Whitby Town Council for 13 years, first as a town councillor and as a regional councillor from 2010 until his election to the provincial legislature in 2016.

In January 2018, after party leader Patrick Brown stepped down and was replaced by Vic Fedeli, Coe replaced Brown as the party's education critic.

Prior to entering politics, Coe had worked in both the private sector and for several ministries in the provincial government. From November 2018 until May 2022, he served as the Government Chief Whip in the Legislative Assembly of Ontario. Since June 2022, he has served as the Parliamentary Assistant to the Premier of Ontario.

== Electoral record ==
2025 Ontario general election: Whitby
Party	Candidate	Votes	%	±%	Expenditures
Progressive Conservative	Lorne Coe	24,803	48.11	+0.74	$99,363
Liberal	Roger Gordon	20,440	39.64	+18.91	$15,662
New Democratic	Jamie Nye	4,097	7.95	–14.88	$3,869
Green	Steven Toman	1,376	2.67	–2.53	$1,786
New Blue	Ralph Blank	844	1.64	–0.32	$1,469
Total valid votes/expense limit		51,560	99.46	+0.03	$180,967
Total rejected, unmarked, and declined ballots		280	0.54	-0.03	
Turnout		51,840	46.49	+1.61	
Eligible voters		111,517			
Progressive Conservative hold		Swing		–9.2	
Source: Elections Ontario

2022 Ontario general election: Whitby
Party	Candidate	Votes	%	±%	Expenditures
Progressive Conservative	Lorne Coe	21,840	47.37	+1.57	$61,926
New Democratic	Sara Labelle	10,524	22.83	-13.78	$60,914
Liberal	Aadil Mohammed	9,556	20.73	+7.85	$2,562
Green	Stephanie Leblanc	2,397	5.20	+1.81	$62
New Blue	Trystan Lackner	903	1.96	N/A	$3,470
Ontario Party	Emil Labaj	519	1.13	N/A	$0
Freedom	Douglas Thom	197	0.43	N/A	$0
Independent	Christopher Rinella	168	0.36	N/A	$0
Total valid votes/expense limit		46,104	99.43	N/A	$144,633
Total rejected, unmarked, and declined ballots		262	0.56	N/A	
Turnout		46,366	44.88		
Eligible voters		101,835			
Progressive Conservative hold		Swing		+7.68	
Source(s): "Summary of Valid Votes Cast for Each Candidate" (PDF). Elections Ontario. 2022. Archived from the original on 2023-05-18.; "Statistical Summary by Electoral District" (PDF). Elections Ontario. 2022. Archived from the original on 2023-05-21.

2018 Ontario general election: Whitby
Party	Candidate	Votes	%
Progressive Conservative	Lorne Coe	26,471	45.80
New Democratic	Niki Lundquist	21,158	36.61
Liberal	Leisa Washington	7,441	12.87
Green	Stacey Leadbetter	1,958	3.39
Libertarian	Ronald Halabi	522	0.90
Freedom	Doug Thom	246	0.43
Total valid votes		57,796	100.0
Progressive Conservative pickup new district.			
Source: Elections Ontario

2018 Ontario general election: Whitby
Party	Candidate	Votes	%
Progressive Conservative	Lorne Coe	26,471	45.80
New Democratic	Niki Lundquist	21,158	36.61
Liberal	Leisa Washington	7,441	12.87
Green	Stacey Leadbetter	1,958	3.39
Libertarian	Ronald Halabi	522	0.90
Freedom	Doug Thom	246	0.43
Total valid votes		57,796	100.0
Progressive Conservative pickup new district.			
Source: Elections Ontario

Ontario provincial by-election, February 11, 2016: Whitby—Oshawa Resignation of Christine Elliott
Party	Candidate	Votes	%	±%
Progressive Conservative	Lorne Coe	17,053	52.92	+12.27
Liberal	Elizabeth Roy	8,865	27.51	−3.99
New Democratic	Niki Lundquist	5,172	16.05	−6.99
Green	Stacey Leadbetter	529	1.64	−2.63
None of the Above	Greg Vezina	261	0.81	–
Independent	Above Znoneofthe	140	0.43	–
Libertarian	Adam McEwan	109	0.34	–
People's Political Party	Garry Cuthbert	52	0.16	–
Freedom	Douglas Thom	34	0.11	−0.44
Pauper	John Turmel	11	0.03	–
Total valid votes		32,226	100.00	
Total rejected, unmarked and declined ballots		61	0.19	
Turnout		32,287	28.94	
Eligible voters		111,566		
Progressive Conservative hold		Swing		+8.13
Source(s) Elections Ontario (February 12, 2016). "Return from the Records, 2016 By-election Whitby—Oshawa (100)" (PDF).
