= Whitby (provincial electoral district) =

Provincial electoral district in Ontario, Canada

Coordinates: 43.93°N 78.96°W

Ontario electoral district
- Whitby in relation to other Greater Toronto Area districts

Provincial electoral district
- Legislature: Legislative Assembly of Ontario
MPP
Lorne Coe
Progressive Conservative
- District created: 2015
- First contested: 2018
- Last contested: 2025

Demographics
- Population (2016): 128,380
- Electors (2018): 96,879
- Area (km²): 149
- Pop. density (per km²): 861.6
- Census division: Durham
- Census subdivision: Whitby

Whitby is a provincial electoral district in Ontario, Canada, that was previously represented in the Legislative Assembly of Ontario as Whitby-Oshawa. The new riding was created through the 2015 Representation Act for the 2018 provincial election, with the district losing some territory to the district of Oshawa to more closely align to the actual town's borders.

== History ==
The riding was created for the 2018 general provincial election and consists of the town of Whitby. The previous district included sections of Oshawa and Ajax.

== Demographics ==
2017 estimates; figures derived from Canada 2016 Census

- Population: 134,875 (estimate; actual census population from 2016 was 128,377)
- Languages: 91.7% English only, 7.6% bilingual French–English, 0.5% neither English nor French
- Average individual income: $58,383
- Median individual income: $41,419
- Average household income: $126,596
- Median household income: $101,373
- Denizens with Canadian citizenship: 130,327 (96.6%)
- Denizens with citizenship other than Canadian: 4,547 (3.3%)
- Immigrated between 2000 and 2005: 2,817
- Immigrated between 2006 and 2011: 2,338
- Immigrated after 2012: 2,386
- Born in province of residence: 95,247
- Born outside province of residence: 10,829

== Members of Provincial Parliament ==
Whitby
Assembly	Years	Member	Party
Riding created from Whitby—Oshawa
42nd	2018–2022	Lorne Coe	Progressive Conservative
43rd	2022–present	Lorne Coe	Progressive Conservative

== Election results ==
Winning party in each polling division of Whitby at the 2025 Ontario general election

2025 Ontario general election
Party	Candidate	Votes	%	±%	Expenditures
Progressive Conservative	Lorne Coe	24,803	48.11	+0.74	$99,363
Liberal	Roger Gordon	20,440	39.64	+18.91	$15,662
New Democratic	Jamie Nye	4,097	7.95	–14.88	$3,869
Green	Steven Toman	1,376	2.67	–2.53	$1,786
New Blue	Ralph Blank	844	1.64	–0.32	$1,469
Total valid votes/expense limit		51,560	99.46	+0.03	$180,967
Total rejected, unmarked, and declined ballots		280	0.54	-0.03	
Turnout		51,840	46.49	+1.61	
Eligible voters		111,517			
Progressive Conservative hold		Swing		–9.2	
Source: Elections Ontario

Winning party in each polling division of Whitby at the 2022 Ontario general election

2022 Ontario general election
Party	Candidate	Votes	%	±%	Expenditures
Progressive Conservative	Lorne Coe	21,840	47.37	+1.57	$61,926
New Democratic	Sara Labelle	10,524	22.83	-13.78	$60,914
Liberal	Aadil Mohammed	9,556	20.73	+7.85	$2,562
Green	Stephanie Leblanc	2,397	5.20	+1.81	$62
New Blue	Trystan Lackner	903	1.96	N/A	$3,470
Ontario Party	Emil Labaj	519	1.13	N/A	$0
Freedom	Douglas Thom	197	0.43	N/A	$0
Independent	Christopher Rinella	168	0.36	N/A	$0
Total valid votes/expense limit		46,104	99.43	N/A	$144,633
Total rejected, unmarked, and declined ballots		262	0.56	N/A	
Turnout		46,366	44.88		
Eligible voters		101,835			
Progressive Conservative hold		Swing		+7.68	
Source(s): "Summary of Valid Votes Cast for Each Candidate" (PDF). Elections Ontario. 2022. Archived from the original on May 18, 2023.; "Statistical Summary by Electoral District" (PDF). Elections Ontario. 2022. Archived from the original on May 21, 2023.

2018 Ontario general election
Party	Candidate	Votes	%
Progressive Conservative	Lorne Coe	26,471	45.80
New Democratic	Niki Lundquist	21,158	36.61
Liberal	Leisa Washington	7,441	12.87
Green	Stacey Leadbetter	1,958	3.39
Libertarian	Ronald Halabi	522	0.90
Freedom	Doug Thom	246	0.43
Total valid votes		57,796	100.0
Progressive Conservative pickup new district.			
Source: Elections Ontario

== See also ==
- List of Ontario provincial electoral districts
- Canadian provincial electoral districts
