= Whitby—Oshawa (provincial electoral district) =

Former provincial electoral district

Coordinates: 43.91°N 78.91°W

Ontario electoral district
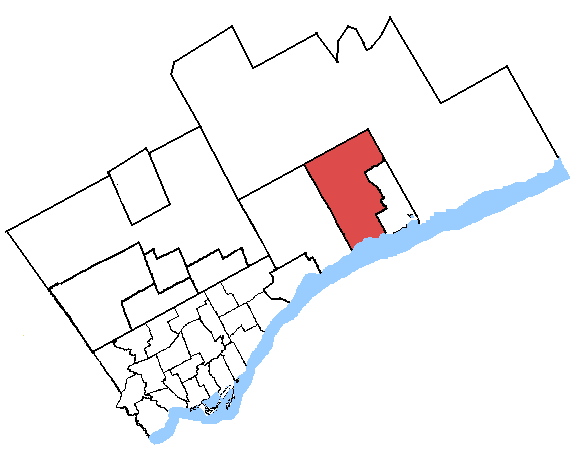
- Whitby—Oshawa in relation to other Greater Toronto ridings

Defunct provincial electoral district
- Legislature: Legislative Assembly of Ontario
- District created: 2006
- District abolished: 2018
- First contested: 2011
- Last contested: 2016-by

Demographics
- Population (2011): 146,307
- Electors (2014): 110,398
- Area (km²): 234
- Census division(s): Durham
- Census subdivision(s): Whitby, Oshawa

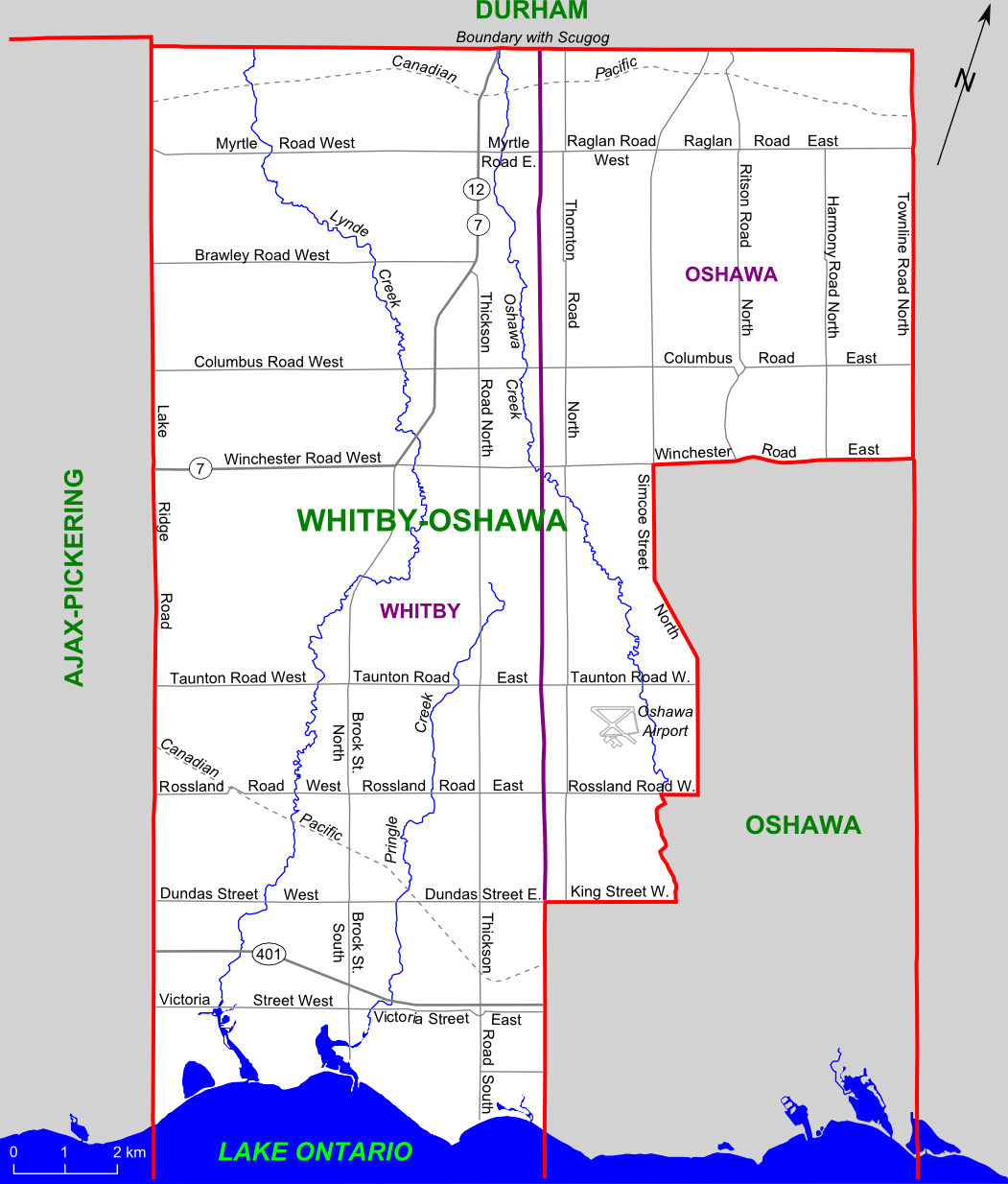
Map of Whitby-Oshawa

Whitby—Oshawa was a provincial electoral district in Ontario, Canada, that was represented in the Legislative Assembly of Ontario from the 2007 provincial election until 2018. The riding was adjusted by the 2015 Representation Act for the 2018 provincial election, losing some territory to the district of Oshawa, and replaced as the district of Whitby.

== History ==
The riding was created in 2003 and consists of 68 percent of the Whitby—Ajax district, 20 percent of the Oshawa district and three percent of the Durham. The provincial electoral district was created from the same ridings in 2007.

It consists of the Town of Whitby and northwestern section of the City of Oshawa (specifically, the portion of the city lying north and west of a line drawn from the western city limit east along King Street West, north along the Oshawa Creek, east along Rossland Road West, north along Simcoe Street North, and east along Winchester Road East to the eastern city limit).

For the 2018 election, Whitby-Oshawa was re-districted as Whitby to more closely correspond to the actual town's borders.

== Demographics ==
According to the 2011 Canadian census

- Population: 146,307
- Ethnic Groups: 81.4% White, 5.5% Black, 4.3% South Asian, 1.7% Chinese, 1.7% Filipino, 1.4% Aboriginal
- Languages: 85.3% English, 2.1% French, 1.5% Italian, 1.1% Chinese
- Religion: 71.2% Christian (32.6% Catholic, 10.3% United Church, 8.3% Anglican, 2.6% Presbyterian, 2.4% Christian Orthodox, 2.1% Baptist, 10.4% Other Christian), 2.6% Muslim, 1.4% Hindu, 23.6% No religion.
- Average household income: $104,969
- Median household income: $89,608
- Average individual income: $48,444
- Median individual income: $37,099

== Members of Provincial Parliament ==
Whitby—Oshawa
Assembly	Years	Member	Party
Riding created from Whitby—Ajax, Oshawa and Durham
39th	2007–2011	Christine Elliott	Progressive Conservative
40th	2011–2014	Christine Elliott	Progressive Conservative
41st	2014–2015	Christine Elliott	Progressive Conservative
41st	2016–2018	Lorne Coe	Progressive Conservative
Riding dissolved into Whitby, Durham and Oshawa

== Election results ==
Ontario provincial by-election, February 11, 2016 Resignation of Christine Elliott
Party	Candidate	Votes	%	±%
Progressive Conservative	Lorne Coe	17,053	52.92	+12.27
Liberal	Elizabeth Roy	8,865	27.51	−3.99
New Democratic	Niki Lundquist	5,172	16.05	−6.99
Green	Stacey Leadbetter	529	1.64	−2.63
None of the Above	Greg Vezina	261	0.81	–
Independent	Above Znoneofthe	140	0.43	–
Libertarian	Adam McEwan	109	0.34	–
People's Political Party	Garry Cuthbert	52	0.16	–
Freedom	Douglas Thom	34	0.11	−0.44
Pauper	John Turmel	11	0.03	–
Total valid votes		32,226	100.00	
Total rejected, unmarked and declined ballots		61	0.19	
Turnout		32,287	28.94	
Eligible voters		111,566		
Progressive Conservative hold		Swing		+8.13
Source(s) Elections Ontario (February 12, 2016). "Return from the Records, 2016 By-election Whitby—Oshawa (100)" (PDF).

2014 Ontario general election
Party	Candidate	Votes	%	±%
Progressive Conservative	Christine Elliott	24,027	40.65	-7.52
Liberal	Ajay Krishnan	18,617	31.50	-1.90
New Democratic	Ryan Kelly	13,621	23.04	+7.58
Green	Stacey Leadbetter	2,523	4.27	+2.03
Freedom	Douglas Thom	322	0.54	+0.23
Total valid votes		59,110	100.00	
Total rejected ballots		892	1.49	+1.18
Turnout		60,002	54.35	+4.66
Eligible voters		110,398		
Progressive Conservative hold		Swing		-2.81
Source: Elections Ontario

2011 Ontario general election
Party	Candidate	Votes	%	±%
Progressive Conservative	Christine Elliott	24,499	48.17	+4.16
Liberal	Elizabeth Roy	16,988	33.40	−2.59
New Democratic	Maret Sadem-Thompson	7,865	15.46	+4.34
Green	Bradley Gibson	1,139	2.24	−5.02
Special Needs	Dan King	211	0.41	
Freedom	Douglas Thom	160	0.31	+0.02
Total valid votes		50,862	100.00	
Total rejected, unmarked and declined ballots		154	0.30	-0.22
Turnout		51,016	49.69	-3.84
Eligible voters		102,672		
Progressive Conservative hold		Swing		+3.38
Source(s) "Official return from the records / Rapport des registres officiels - Whitby—Oshawa" (PDF). Elections Ontario. 2011.

2007 Ontario general election
Party	Candidate	Votes	%	±%
Progressive Conservative	Christine Elliott	22,694	44.00	−3.12
Liberal	Laura Hammer	18,560	35.99	−1.00
New Democratic	Nigel Moses	5,734	11.12	−1.57
Green	Doug Anderson	3,745	7.26	
Libertarian	Marty Gobin	414	0.80	
Family Coalition	Dale Chilvers	275	0.53	
Freedom	Bill Frampton	152	0.29	
Total valid votes		51,572	100.00	
Total rejected ballots		270	0.52	
Turnout		51,842	53.53	
Eligible voters		96,842		
Progressive Conservative hold		Swing		−1.06

^ Change is from redistributed results.

2003 general election redistributed results
Party	Vote	%
Progressive Conservative	22,278	47.13
Liberal	17,485	36.99
New Democratic	5,999	12.69
Others	1,511	3.20

== 2007 electoral reform referendum ==
2007 Ontario electoral reform referendum
Side	Votes	%
First Past the Post	33,509	66.18
Mixed member proportional	17,121	33.82
Total	50,630	100.00
Rejected	1,212	2.34
