= Dawn Gallagher Murphy =

Canadian politician

Dawn Gallagher Murphy MPP
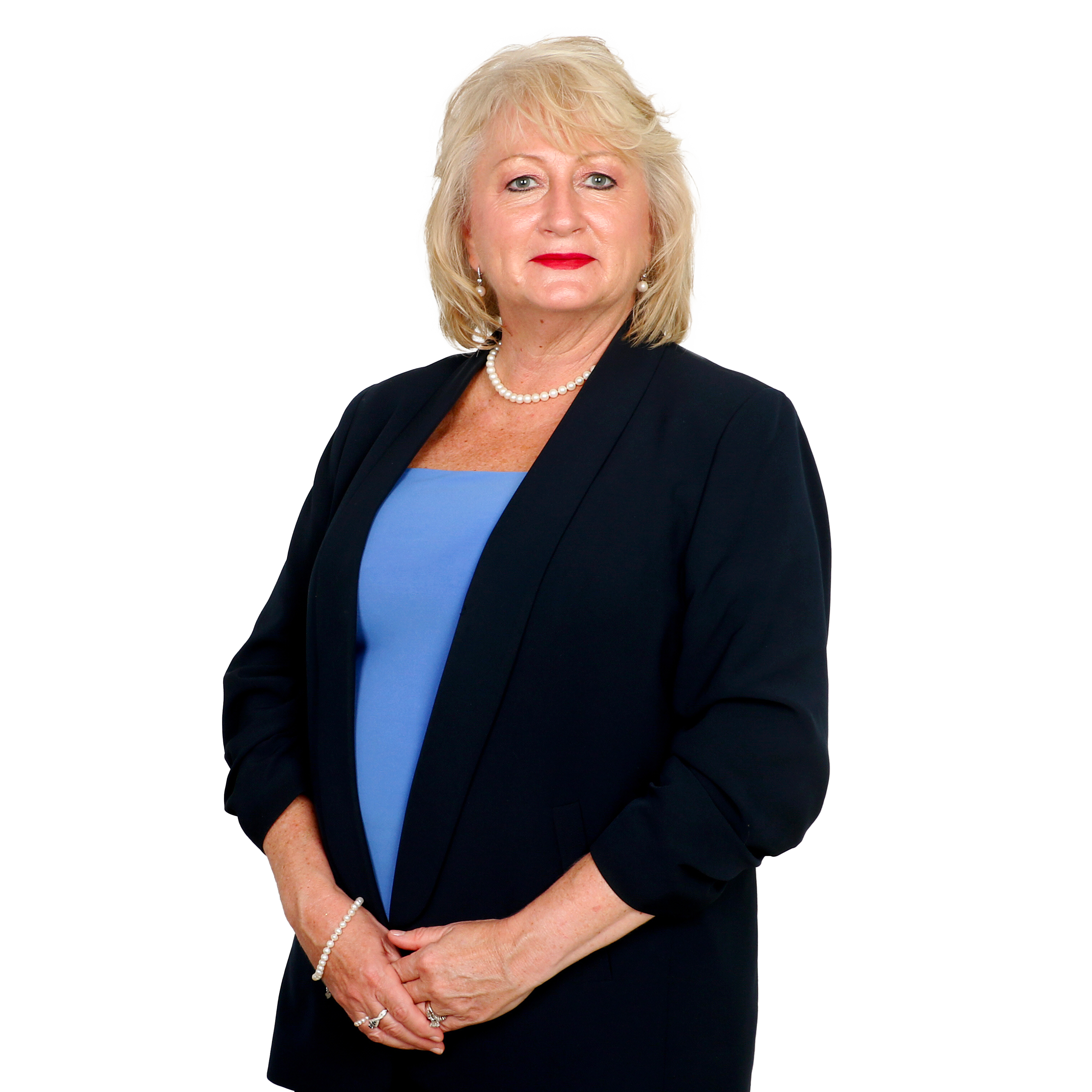
- Dawn Gallagher Murphy

Member of the Ontario Provincial Parliament for Newmarket—Aurora
- Incumbent
- Assumed office June 2, 2022
- Preceded by: Christine Elliott

Personal details
- Party: Progressive Conservative

Dawn Gallagher Murphy is a Canadian businesswoman and politician who was first elected to the Legislative Assembly of Ontario in the 2022 provincial election and re-elected in the 2025 provincial election. She currently serves as Parliamentary Assistant to Minister of Artificial Intelligence Adoption. She is also President of the Ontario chapter of the Assemblée parlementaire de la Francophonie, and sits on the Standing Committee on the Interior and the Standing Committee on Procedure and House Affairs. She represents the riding of Newmarket—Aurora as a member of the Progressive Conservative Party of Ontario.

== Early life ==
Dawn Gallagher Murphy was born in Hamilton, the daughter of an Irish immigrant father who put himself through school to become an Anglican Minister. The family moved to Georgetown, ON where they lived until Dawn was 11 years old, then returning to Hamilton where she finished Secondary School.

== Education and career ==
Dawn Gallagher Murphy attended the University of Western Ontario, obtaining a Bachelor of Arts with a degree in political science with a minor in French. After two summers of French immersion school in Quebec, she went to France to study at Sorbonne University where she obtained a Certification in French language. She also attended the Chambre de Commerce et d’Industrie de Paris where she received a Certificate of Business.

Upon her return to Canada, Gallagher Murphy worked as a bilingual customer service and sales agent at Amsco, a manufacturer of hospital equipment. Dawn then moved to the secure payment industry as a bilingual sales manager specializing in the retail banking industry. She went on to become director of sales; responsible for relationship management with Canada's top banking institutions managing new card portfolio launches and the introduction of digital payments in Quebec, Ontario and the U.S. After ten years, she started a consultancy firm and was on the forefront of migrating the payment technology onto a digital platform including Microchip Technology, Dual Interface (contactless), Mobile and Online Payments.

== Political career ==
Dawn Gallagher Murphy moved into politics in 2018, working with Deputy Premier and Minister of Health, Christine Elliott through the pandemic, supporting people in communities across Ontario, with specific attention to Newmarket—Aurora.

After four years, Elliott retired and Dawn became the Candidate of Record for Newmarket—Aurora. On June 2, 2022, Gallagher Murphy was elected as MPP for Newmarket—Aurora with 18,671 votes (44.97%).

Upon being elected, Dawn became Parliamentary Assistant to Syliva Jones, the Minister of Health. She held numerous round table discussions with primary care providers across the province to discuss challenges facing the sector.

From September 2022 to December 2023, Gallagher Murphy was a member of the Standing Committee on Procedure and House Affairs which conducted the study for the restoration and rehabilitation of the Legislative precinct (Queen's Park.).

MPP Gallagher Murphy put forward a Private Members Bill to proclaim the month of June as Senior's Month. It has passed second reading and is now going to the Standing Committee on Social Policy.

On April 10, 2024, Dawn Gallagher Murphy tabled a Private Members Motion focused on ensuring the transparent and ethical use of Artificial Intelligence (AI) in government, while considering cybersecurity threats. This motion will build upon the Ontario Trustworthy AI Framework. It received unanimous support from all parties.

On July 3, 2024, after six years of planning and hard work, Gallagher Murphy announced the New York Region Mental Health Community Care Hub would be located in Newmarket. This facility will make it faster and easier for people in York Region to connect to high-quality, comprehensive mental health and addictions services close to home.

On December 19, 2024, Bill 70, the Seniors Month Act, 2024, received Royal Assent, officially proclaiming the month of June as Seniors Month in Ontario. This legislation is intended to recognize the contributions seniors have made—and continue to make—to our communities across the province. Seniors Month will serve as an annual opportunity to celebrate older adults and promote initiatives that support healthy aging and well-being.

In February 2025, Dawn Gallagher Murphy was re-elected as the Member of Provincial Parliament for Newmarket—Aurora with 20,260 votes, earning 47.73% of the vote.

In October 2026, Dawn Gallagher Murphy became Parliamentary Assistant to the Minister of Artificial Intelligence Adoption, marking a new chapter in her parliamentary work focused on artificial intelligence and innovation in Ontario.

== Electoral history ==
2022 Ontario general election: Newmarket—Aurora
Party	Candidate	Votes	%	±%
Progressive Conservative	Dawn Gallagher Murphy	18,671	44.97	−2.74
Liberal	Sylvain Roy	13,069	31.47	+8.71
New Democratic	Denis Heng	5,281	12.72	−11.13
Green	Carolina Rodriguez	2,332	5.62	+2.04
New Blue	Iwona Czarnecka	1,520	3.66	
Ontario Party	Krista Mckenzie	532	1.28	
Moderate	Yuri Duboisky	118	0.28	+0.17
Total valid votes		41,523	100.0	
Total rejected, unmarked, and declined ballots		220		
Turnout		41,743	44.42	
Eligible voters		93,342		
Progressive Conservative hold		Swing		−5.73
Source(s): "Summary of Valid Votes Cast for Each Candidate" (PDF). Elections Ontario. 2022. Archived from the original on 2023-05-18.; "Statistical Summary by Electoral District" (PDF). Elections Ontario. 2022. Archived from the original on 2023-05-21.
