= Chris Ballard (politician) =

Canadian politician

The Honourable Chris Ballard ECO
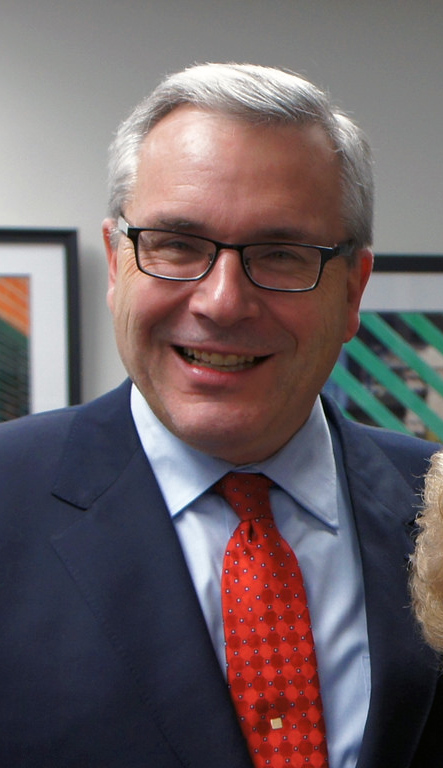
- Ballard in 2014

Member of the Ontario Provincial Parliament for Newmarket—Aurora
- In office June 12, 2014 – June 7, 2018
- Preceded by: Frank Klees
- Succeeded by: Christine Elliott

Personal details
- Born: King City, Ontario
- Party: Liberal
- Spouse: Audrey
- Children: 3
- Occupation: Businessman; journalist

Christopher Ballard is a former politician in Ontario, Canada. He was a Liberal member of the Legislative Assembly of Ontario from 2014 to 2018 who represented the riding of Newmarket—Aurora. He was a member of cabinet in the government of Kathleen Wynne.

== Background ==
Attended King City Secondary School where, upon graduation, he had aspirations of becoming a Marine Biologist.

Ballard was a journalist with the Newmarket Era, the Aurora Banner, the Orillia Packet and Times, Canadian Press and the Toronto Star. He has run his own business consultancy firm CSB Communications with clients in the business, education, association sectors in Ontario. He was also the executive director for a consumers advocacy group. He lives in Aurora with his wife Audrey where they raised three children.

Ballard was presented with an honorary lifetime member award by Speaker of the Ontario Legislature, Michael A. Brown, on behalf of the Public Affairs Association of Canada. Ballard is a former president of the association and was recognized for his years of dedication to the association.

== Politics ==
Ballard was elected as a town councillor in Aurora in 2010 and vacated his council seat before finishing a full term.

He ran in the 2014 provincial election as the Liberal candidate in the riding of Newmarket-Aurora, a long-time PC held riding north of Toronto. In a surprising upset, he defeated Progressive Conservative candidate Jane Twinney by 3,412 votes. Ballard's win was part of a strong showing by the Ontario Liberals in the York Region, where the party had a historically strong showing in many traditionally PC and swing ridings.

He previously served as parliamentary assistant to the Minister of Government and Consumer Services. In June 2016, he was appointed to cabinet as Minister of Housing and Minister Responsible for the Poverty-Reduction Strategy.

After the resignation of Glen Murray as Minister of Environment and Climate Change on July 31, 2017, Ballard was appointed his successor by Premier Kathleen Wynne.

While MPP Ballard moved bill 42 to directly elect the chair of the Region of York. This was never realized as it was reversed in July 2018.

He ran for re-election in the 2018 provincial election and was defeated, coming in 3rd in the riding of Newmarket-Aurora with less than 23% of the vote. Ballard's loss was part of a weak showing by the Ontario Liberals who retained only 7 seats and lost official party status.

He ran in the 2018 municipal election for Mayor of the Town of Aurora and was defeated, coming in 3rd with less than 20% of the vote.

Ballard exited politics in 2019 to be the CEO of Passive House Canada.

On January 12, 2025, Ballard was nominated as the Ontario Liberal candidate in Newmarket—Aurora.

Ballard lost this election by 2,425 votes marking his third electoral loss in a row.

=== Cabinet positions ===
Wynne ministry, Province of Ontario (2013–2018)
Cabinet posts (2)
Predecessor	Office	Successor
Glen Murray	Minister of the Environment and Climate Change; 2017–2018	Rod Phillips
Ted McMeekin	Minister of Housing; 2016–2017; Also responsible for Poverty Reduction Strategy	Peter Milczyn

== Election results ==
2018 Ontario general election: Newmarket—Aurora
Party	Candidate	Votes	%	±%
Progressive Conservative	Christine Elliott	24,813	47.71	+10.98
New Democratic	Melissa Williams	12,405	23.85	+11.91
Liberal	Chris Ballard	11,840	22.76	–21.36
Green	Michelle Bourdeau	1,859	3.57	–0.47
Independent	Dorian Baxter	447	0.86	–
Trillium	Bob Yaciuk	212	0.41	–
Libertarian	Lori Robbins	192	0.37	–
None of the Above	Denis Van Decker	185	0.36	–
Moderate	Denis Gorlynskiy	60	0.12	–
Total valid votes		52,013	99.01	
Total rejected, unmarked and declined ballots		518	0.99	–0.44
Turnout		52,531	58.97	+5.57
Eligible voters		89,076		
Progressive Conservative notional gain from Liberal		Swing		+16.17
Source: Elections Ontario

2014 Ontario general election: Newmarket—Aurora
Party	Candidate	Votes	%	±%
Liberal	Chris Ballard	22,942	43.8	+8.2
Progressive Conservative	Jane Twinney	19,510	37.25	-10.0
New Democratic	Angus Duff	6,092	11.63	-2.7
Green	Andrew Roblin	2,167	4.14	+1.4
Canadians' Choice	Dorian Baxter	925	1.77	
Libertarian	Jason Jenkins	579	1.11	
Trillium	Bob Yaciuk	164	0.31	
Total valid votes		52,379	100.00	
Liberal gain from Progressive Conservative		Swing		+9.1
Source: Elections Ontario
