= HealthForceOntario =

HealthForceOntario was a collaborative initiative, announced May 3, 2006, involving two Ontario Canada ministries: Ministry of Health and Long-Term Care (Ontario) and the Ministry of Training, Colleges and Universities. It was subsequently subsumed under Ontario Health in 2019.

The goal of the HealthForceOntario strategy is to ensure that Ontarians have access to the right number and mix of qualified health care providers. Its mandate is to identify and address Ontario's health human resource needs, engage partners in education and health care to develop skilled providers and create the health care delivery teams that will make the most of their abilities, introduce new and expanded provider roles to increase the number of providers working in health care and develop the skills of those already in the system, and to make Ontario the employer-of-choice for all health care providers.

== Programs and Initiatives ==
HealthForceOntario programs and initiatives include:

HealthForceOntario Marketing and Recruitment Agency - As an operational service agency, HealthForceOntario Marketing and Recruitment Agency (HFO MRA) is focused on building and maintaining the province's health human resources capacity, leading to two categories of activity:

- Retention and distribution of Ontario's health professionals.
- Recruitment and outreach to internationally educated health professionals living in Ontario, Ontario's recruitment community and practice-ready physicians living outside Ontario who are practising in high-need specialties.

Working with its partners – including communities, Local Health Integration Networks (LHINs), the Government of Ontario, recruiters, and health professionals – HFO MRA aims to achieve the vision of helping to ensure Ontarians have access to the right mix and number of health professionals as they are needed.

HFOJobs is a free job portal with postings for physicians, nurses, and new Ontario nursing graduates.

Access Centre for Internationally Educated Health Professionals - Internationally trained and educated health professionals who are living in Ontario can visit the Access Centre to learn how to qualify for professional practice in Ontario's regulated health professions. The Access Centre offers free services to support newcomers through the licensure and registration process, but is not an employment centre.

Ontario Physician Locum Programs offer resources for physicians across Ontario. The OPLP consists of the following three programs: Rural Family Medicine Locum Program, Northern Specialist Locum Programs, and Emergency Department Coverage Demonstration Project.

== Funding ==
The Allied Health Professional Development Fund - The purpose of the AHPDF is to extend skill and knowledge development opportunities to the following regulated health professionals: Audiologists, Dietitians, Medical Laboratory Technologists, Medical Radiation Technologists, Occupational Therapists, Pharmacists, Physiotherapists, Respiratory Therapists and Speech-Language Pathologists.
