= Whitby Town Council =

Whitby Town Council is the governing body of the town of Whitby, Ontario, Canada, a lower-tier municipality within the Regional Municipality of Durham. It consists of a Mayor; four local Ward Councillors, each of whom represents a particular ward; and four Regional Councillors who, like the Mayor, are elected at-large in a double direct election to also represent the Town on Durham Regional Council.

Under provincial legislation, municipal elections are held every four years, with the most recent one having occurred on October 24, 2022.

== Responsibilities of Council ==
As set out in the Ontario Municipal Act, the Town Council is responsible for

- Representing the public and considering the well-being and interests of the municipality;
- Developing and evaluating the policies and programs of the municipality;
- Determining which services the town provides;
- Ensuring that administrative practices and procedures are in place to implement the decisions of Council;
- Ensuring the accountability and transparency of the operations of the municipality, including the activities of senior management;
- Maintaining the financial integrity of the municipality;
- Carrying out the duties of Council under provincial law.

Generally speaking, the Members of Council are responsible for setting the policy direction for the town; authorizing revenues (taxes and fees) and expenditures by the Town to provide residents with services that meet their needs and expectations; and reviewing and approving land use and development issues.

== Members of Council ==
=== Town Council 2022-2026 ===
The 2022 municipal election was held on October 24, 2022.

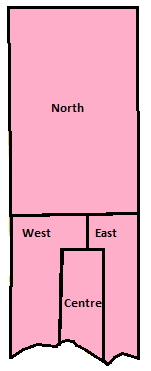
Map of Whitby's four wards

Office	Member
Mayor	Elizabeth Roy
Regional Councillor	Maleeha Shahid
Regional Councillor	Chris Leahy
Regional Councillor	Steve Yamada
Regional Councillor	Rhonda Mulcahy
Councillor, North Ward 1	Steve Lee
Councillor, West Ward 2	Matt Cardwell
Councillor, Central Ward 3	Niki Lundquist
Councillor, East Ward 4	Victoria Bozinovski

=== Town Council 2018-2022 ===
The 2018 municipal election was held on October 22, 2018.

Office	Member
Mayor	Don Mitchell
Regional Councillor	Elizabeth Roy
Regional Councillor	Chris Leahy
Regional Councillor	Steve Yamada
Regional Councillor	Rhonda Mulcahy
Councillor, North Ward 1	Steve Lee
Councillor, West Ward 2	Deidre Newman
Councillor, Central Ward 3	JoAnne Alexander
Councillor, East Ward 4	Maleeha Shahid

=== Town Council 2014-2018 ===
The 2014 municipal election was held on October 27, 2014.

Office	Member	Notes
Mayor	Don Mitchell	
Regional Councillor	Elizabeth Roy	
Regional Councillor	Lorne Coe	Resigned in 2016 to run provincially
Regional Councillor	Derek Gleed	Appointed by Council in 2016 to fill the vacancy created by Lorne Coe's resignation
Regional Councillor	Joe Drumm	
Councillor, North Ward 1	Derek Gleed	
Councillor, North Ward 1	Rhonda Mulcahy	Winner of 2016 Municipal By-Election
Councillor, West Ward 2	Chris Leahy	
Councillor, Central Ward 3	Michael Gerald Emm	
Councillor, East Ward 4	Steve Yamada	

=== Town Council 2010-2014 ===
The 2010 municipal election was held on October 25, 2010.

Office	Member
Mayor	Pat Perkins
Regional Councillor	Don Mitchell
Regional Councillor	Lorne Coe
Regional Councillor	Joe Drumm
Councillor, North Ward	Tracy Hanson
Councillor, West Ward	Elizabeth Roy
Councillor, Centre Ward	Michael Gerald Emm
Councillor, East Ward	Ken Montague
