= Great Y Circus =

Coordinates: 34.0547°N 117.176752°W

Great All American Youth Circus
- Nickname: Great Y Circus
- Interactive map of Great All American Youth Circus
- Country: United States
- State: California
- County: San Bernardino
- Community Circus: 1929
- Website: {https://ymcaeastvalley.org/summercircus/}

The Great All American Youth Circus, also known as The Great Y Circus, is billed as the oldest community circus in the world and is located in Redlands, California, United States.

== History ==
Founded in 1929 by YMCA Director Roy Coble, a former Ringling Brothers Barnum & Bailey performer, the Great Y Circus is a unique tradition in Redlands, California. Billed as the oldest community circus in the world, it is one of only a handful of programs like it in the United States. The Great Y Circus started small and has grown tremendously throughout the years. The only years it was dark were from 1943 to 1948 (during the war), in 1987-1988 (when the YMCA was without the insurance coverage required and continuation of the circus was in doubt), and, due to Covid, in 2020–2021.

Each year, approximately 300 performers of all ages (from 36 months and up) learn circus skills in classes that are held at the YMCA from September through April. The circus features performances such as juggling, trapeze, rings, lyra, unicycling, acrobatics, and teeterboard. Many youths who participate stay in the program for many years, and some alumni have gone on to jobs in professional entertainment industries as stunt performers and circus performers. A few of the performers are even 4th generation performers in this circus.

Small community outreach performances are given throughout the year for a variety of audiences, and the main end-of-season show is held on the first three weekends of May in the Roy Coble Gymnasium at the Redlands YMCA.

Currently, the circus is co-sponsored by the Redlands YMCA and the non-profit Community Circus Arts Corporation. It is managed by a few YMCA staff members and a very large group of volunteers that include trainers, facilitators, and assistants.
