= EHealth Ontario =

Health agency in Canada

eHealth Ontario was the agency tasked with facilitating the development of Ontario's proposed public Electronic Health Record system. Health Informatics in Canada is run provincially, with different provinces creating different systems, albeit sometimes under voluntary Pan-Canadian guidelines published by the federal body Canada Health Infoway. eHealth Ontario was created in September 2008 out of a merger between the Ontario Ministry of Health's electronic health program and the Smart Systems for Health Agency (SSHA), with a mandate to create electronic health records for all patients in the province by 2015. It was plagued by delays and its CEO was fired over a multimillion-dollar contracts scandal in 2009. eHealth Ontario was consolidated into Ontario Health in 2019.

== Drug Profile Viewer System ==
The Drug Profile Viewer System tracks the prescription drug claims information of 2.5 million Ontario Drug Benefit Program and Trillium Drug Program recipients. This system is in use in hospitals throughout Ontario and access is being expanded to health care providers outside of the hospital setting.

== ePrescribing ==
eHealth Ontario created a pilot project through which some doctors are now able to electronically send prescriptions to participating local pharmacies instead of having to manually write down the prescriptions on paper. That pilot project is ongoing.

== Consulting and contracting controversies ==
In May 2009, there were opposition calls for Ontario Health Minister David Caplan's resignation after it was revealed that eHealth Ontario CEO Sarah Kramer had approved about $4.8 million in no-bid contracts during the first four months of the agency's operation, while also spending $50,000 to refurnish her office, and paying consultants up to $300 an hour. One consultant earned about $192,000 in five months. Additionally, nine senior eHealth employees had been fired in a four-month period, some reportedly for challenging the agency's tendering practices.

Kramer was later forced to resign in June 2009, amid questions surrounding a $114,000 bonus paid to her. She received a $317,000 severance package with benefits for 10 months.

eHealth Ontario argued that the no-bid contracts were necessary due to the rapid transition process to eHealth from its predecessor Smart Systems for Health Agency, while Caplan defended Kramer's bonus as part of her move from another agency. The opposition argued that the government of Premier Dalton McGuinty spent five years and $647 million on the forerunner of eHealth Ontario: the Smart Systems for Health Agency, which used 15 per cent of its $225-million annual budget on consultants despite employing 166 people with annual salaries exceeding $100,000, before the project was shut down and restarted as eHealth Ontario.

In a public statement, Kramer argued that when she took over as CEO of eHealth Ontario, she "was charged with turning around a failing behemoth - SSHA - which had already run through more than $600 million dollars with hardly anything to show for it in terms of moving Ontario closer to the goal of eHealth, and modernizing and improving the quality and safety of health care for Ontarians."

Journalists have argued that Sarah Kramer received a "trial by media" and that the province of Ontario will be at a loss with her departure, as delivery of eHealth initiatives will be slowed. Marcus Gee from The Globe and Mail writes, "what happened at eHealth may or may not qualify as scandalous. What happened to Ms. Kramer certainly does. This was media lynching. A good woman and a first-rate civil servant has been hounded from public life, and all of us will suffer for it."

Journalists and former health policy advisors have noted that this media attention detracted from the organization's mandate and ability to deliver on much needed eHealth initiatives and healthcare reform in the province of Ontario. One past policy director for a former Ontario Minister of Health, argued that the public's focus should be on holding the government accountable for mitigating the problems that have resulted and demanding progress on eHealth.

André Picard, a Canadian public health reporter, argued that the public's focus should be on the delivery of electronic health records and not "disingenuous tsk-tsking about the hiring of consultants." He writes, "the true scandal in Ontario is the utter failure of the Ministry of Health to create electronic health records, which will ultimately lead to better and more efficient patient care." Picard argued that Ministry of Health bureaucrats are powerless when it comes to making real change in healthcare, as their political boss's only vision for healthcare is not irritating the public so they can be re-elected. The result is change and innovation can, seemingly, only come from independent agencies or outside consultants.

Two inquiries were launched, but in August 2009, the independent review of eHealth Ontario had been dropped, with Caplan saying it would duplicate the work of Ontario's auditor general.

On October 6, 2009, David Caplan resigned, one day before the release of the report into spending scandals.
