= Community care access centres =

Community Care Access Centres (CCACs) were the first point of contact for Ontario residents with the Home and Community Care system.

The first CCACs were incorporated in the years 1996–7. In 2001 there were 41 CCACs. By 2015, there was only 14.

Before 2002, CACCs were governed by a volunteer board of directors. In December 2001, the government gave itself the ability to continue CACCs under the Community Care Access Corporations Act, 2001 and to appoint the directors and CEO. On April 1, 2009 the government amended the act so that Community Care Access Centres were once again run by volunteers instead of government appointees.

In 2006, the government began the process of aligning CCAC boundaries with the Local Health Integration Network boundaries.

On September 23, 2015, the Auditor General released a report on CACCs. She raised concerns that CACCs over-reported how much money CACCs spent on direct patient care, raised concerns about executive compensation, and about lack of review for some CACC programs. She also found the patients could get better care from CACCs based on where they lived.

In 2017, the CCACs were dissolved and transferred to their corresponding Local Health Integration Network.
