= Sylvia Jones =

Canadian politician

The Honourable Sylvia Jones ECO MPP
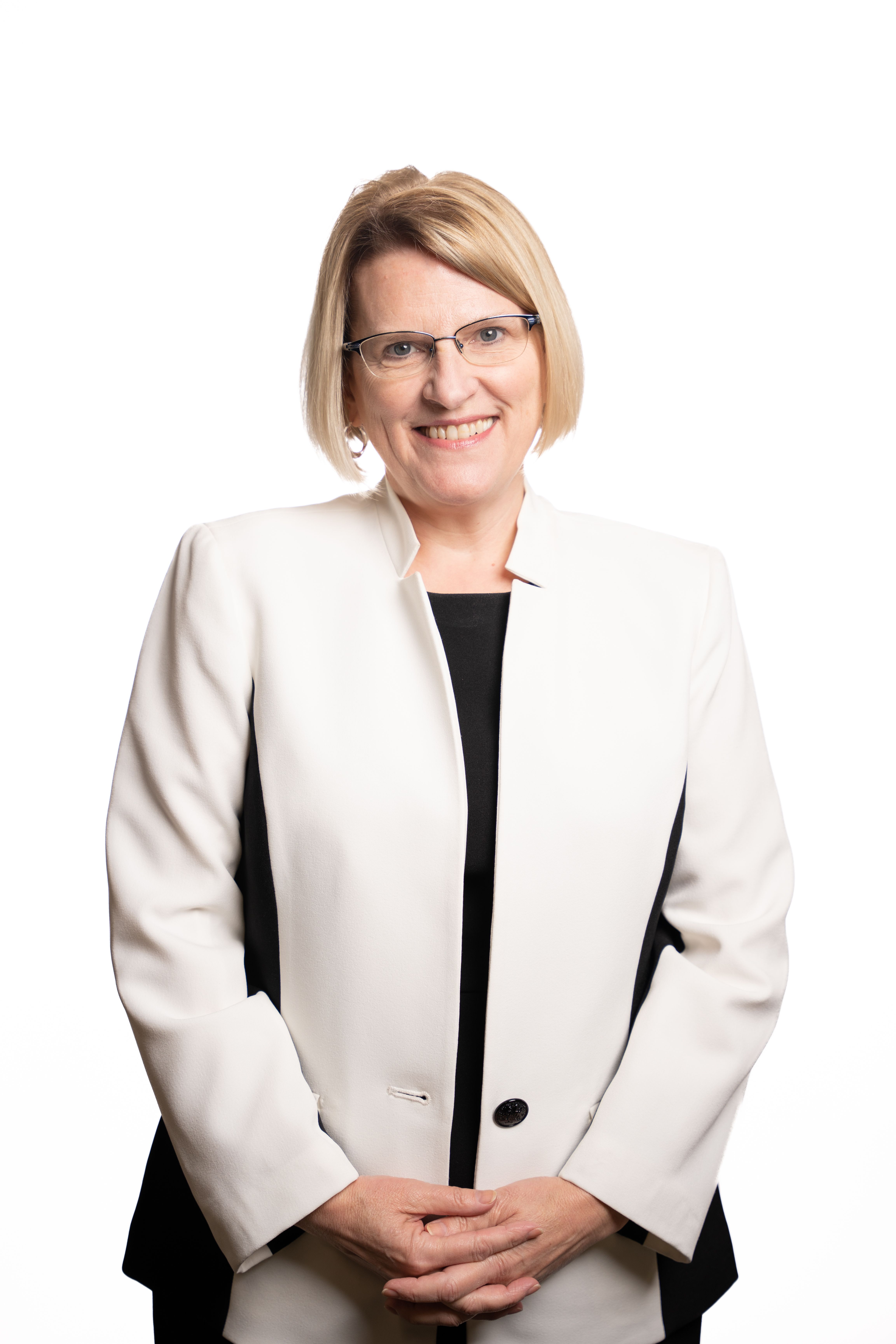
- Jones in 2024

12th Deputy Premier of Ontario
- Incumbent
- Assumed office June 24, 2022
- Premier: Doug Ford
- Preceded by: Christine Elliott

Minister of Health
- Incumbent
- Assumed office June 24, 2022
- Premier: Doug Ford
- Preceded by: Christine Elliott

Solicitor General of Ontario (Note: The position was known as the minister of community safety and correctional services until the title solicitor general was restored on April 4, 2019.)
- In office November 5, 2018 – June 24, 2022
- Premier: Doug Ford
- Preceded by: Michael Tibollo
- Succeeded by: Michael Kerzner

Minister of Tourism, Culture and Sport
- In office June 29, 2018 – November 5, 2018
- Premier: Doug Ford
- Preceded by: Daiene Vernile
- Succeeded by: Michael Tibollo

Member of the Ontario Provincial Parliament for Dufferin—Caledon
- Incumbent
- Assumed office October 10, 2007
- Preceded by: Riding established

Personal details
- Born: 1965 (age 60–61)
- Party: Progressive Conservative
- Spouse: David Gillies
- Children: 2
- Occupation: Politician; executive assistant

Sylvia Jones ECO MPP (born c. 1965) is a Canadian politician who has served as the deputy premier of Ontario and minister of health since June 24, 2022. Jones sits as the member of Provincial Parliament (MPP) for Dufferin—Caledon, representing the Progressive Conservative (PC) party, and has held her seat since she was first elected following the 2007 general election. She joined the provincial cabinet after the PCs formed government in 2018, and has been successively the minister of tourism, culture and sport, the minister of community safety and correctional services, and the solicitor general of Ontario.

== Background ==
Jones grew up on her family's farm. She attended Fanshawe College, where she received a diploma in radio broadcasting. She worked as an executive assistant for former PC party leader John Tory. She and her husband David live in Dufferin County and are the parents of two children.

== Politics ==
Jones ran in the 2007 provincial election as the Progressive Conservative candidate in the new riding of Dufferin—Caledon. She was re-elected in 2011 and 2014. The Ontario PCs were in opposition from the time of Jones' election to the 2018 provincial election.

=== In opposition ===
During her time in opposition, Jones introduced several private member's bills. These include the Protecting Vulnerable People Against Picketing Act, Criminal Record Checks for Volunteers Act, Social Assistance Statute Law Amendment Act, and the Aggregate Recycling Promotion Act. Only the Aggregate Recycling Promotion Act in 2014 made it past first reading. The bill made it to third reading before it died on the order paper when the 2014 election was called. Another private member's, Bill 94, which would have ensured that Ontario Disability Support Program payments could not be scaled back as a result of Registered Disability Support Program contributions, was eventually adopted by the Liberal government through regulation.

She was named the co-deputy leader on September 10, 2015 following a shadow cabinet shuffle.

=== In government ===
The Ontario PC Party formed government following the 2018 election, with newly elected Premier Doug Ford appointing Jones as the minister of tourism, culture and sport. In November, Jones took over as the minister of community safety and correctional services role. Her title was changed to Solicitor General in April 2019 and the name of her ministry was also restored to Ministry of the Solicitor General, as it had been prior to 2002.

As Solicitor General, Jones played a role in the PC government's response to the COVID-19 pandemic in Ontario, as the mandate of her portfolio includes overseeing policing and law enforcement.

==== COVID-19 ====
Amid growing case numbers in 2021, the government moved to introduce a third province-wide shutdown. As part of the response, Jones announced on April 16, 2021 that she would be authorizing police and bylaw enforcement to require anyone who is not in a private residence to explain why they’re not at home and provide their home address, as well as pull people over while driving to ask why they are not at home. The regulations raised concerns about a re-legalization of carding. Indeed, the government experienced significant backlash with the new enforcement measures, with some commentators – such as the National Post's Randall Denley, a former PC party nominated candidate – equating the province to a "police state". After 21 police services across the province announced that they would refuse to enforce the new measures, and round criticism in the media, Jones' government promptly amended the new regulation the next day and rescinded the new enforcement powers.

==== Minister of Health and Deputy Premier ====
Following the 2022 provincial election, Premier Ford named Jones as the new deputy premier and minister of health, replacing Christine Elliott, who did not seek re-election.

== Cabinet Posts ==
Ford ministry, Province of Ontario (2018–present)
Cabinet posts (4)
Predecessor	Office	Successor
Christine Elliott	Minister of Health; June 24, 2022 –	
Position re-established	Solicitor General of Ontario; April 4, 2019 – June 24, 2022	Michael Kerzner
Michael Tibollo	Minister of Community Safety and Correctional Services; November 5, 2018 – April 4, 2019; Ministry changed to Ministry of Solicitor General from Ministry of Community Safety and Correctional Services on April 4, 2019	Position abolished
Daiene Vernile	Minister of Tourism, Culture and Sport; June 29, 2018 – November 5, 2018	Michael Tibollo

== Electoral history ==
2025 Ontario general election: Dufferin—Caledon
Party	Candidate	Votes	%	±%
Progressive Conservative	Sylvia Jones	26,072	52.49	+2.82
Liberal	Michael Dehn	12,606	25.38	+6.57
Green	Sandy Brown	6,157	12.39	–1.74
New Democratic	George Nakitsas	3,184	6.41	–4.36
New Blue	Kris Eggleton	1,074	2.16	–2.78
Independent	Jeffrey Halsall	384	0.77	N/A
Moderate	Alexey Cherkashov	197	0.40	+0.17
Total valid votes/expense limit		49,674	99.43	–0.04
Total rejected, unmarked, and declined ballots		284	0.57	+0.04
Turnout		49,958	42.95	+0.88
Eligible voters		116,309		
Progressive Conservative hold		Swing		–1.88
Source: Elections Ontario

2022 Ontario general election: Dufferin—Caledon
Party	Candidate	Votes	%	±%
Progressive Conservative	Sylvia Jones	22,911	49.67	−3.42
Liberal	Bob Gordanier	8,678	18.81	+6.35
Green	Laura Campbell	6,518	14.13	+1.60
New Democratic	Tess Prendergast	4,967	10.77	−9.57
New Blue	Andrea Banyai	2,280	4.94	
Ontario Party	Lily Nguyen	589	1.28	
Moderate	Erickumar Emmanuel	105	0.23	
Public Benefit	Kay Sayer	79	0.17	
Total valid votes		46,127	100.0	
Total rejected, unmarked, and declined ballots		246		
Turnout		46,373	42.07	
Eligible voters		109,942		
Progressive Conservative hold		Swing		−4.88
Source(s): "Summary of Valid Votes Cast for Each Candidate" (PDF). Elections Ontario. 2022. Archived from the original on May 18, 2023.; "Statistical Summary by Electoral District" (PDF). Elections Ontario. 2022. Archived from the original on May 21, 2023.

2018 Ontario general election
Party	Candidate	Votes	%	±%
Progressive Conservative	Sylvia Jones	29,702	53.08	+13.22
New Democratic	Andrea Mullarkey	11,381	20.34	+8.68
Green	Laura Campbell	7,011	12.53	-4.10
Liberal	Bob Gordanier	6,972	12.46	-18.20
Libertarian	Jeff Harris	430	0.78	-0.41
Consensus Ontario	Stephen McKendrick	301	0.54	+0.54
Trillium	Andrew Nowell	157	0.28	+0.28
Total valid votes		55,956	100.00	
Turnout		55,956	58.55	
Eligible voters		95,569		
Progressive Conservative hold		Swing		+13.22
Source: Elections Ontario

2014 Ontario general election
Party	Candidate	Votes	%	±%
Progressive Conservative	Sylvia Jones	18,017	39.86	-7.09
Liberal	Bobbie Daid	13,861	30.66	+3.91
Green	Karren Wallace	7,518	16.63	+2.05
New Democratic	Rehya Yazbek	5,269	11.66	+0.60
Libertarian	Daniel Kowalewski	538	1.19	+0.53
Total valid votes		45,203	100.00	
Progressive Conservative hold		Swing		-5.50
Source: Elections Ontario

2011 Ontario general election
Party	Candidate	Votes	%	±%
Progressive Conservative	Sylvia Jones	17,833	46.95	+5.12
Liberal	Lori Holloway	10,162	26.75	-5.27
Green	Rob Strang	5,540	14.58	-1.71
New Democratic	Karen Gventer	4,200	11.06	+1.20
Libertarian	Daniel Kowalewski	250	0.66	
Total valid votes		37,985	100.00	
Total rejected, unmarked and declined ballots		166	0.44	
Turnout		38,151	47.74	
Eligible voters		79,918		
Progressive Conservative hold		Swing		+5.20
Source: Elections Ontario

2007 Ontario general election
Party	Candidate	Votes	%	±%
Progressive Conservative	Sylvia Jones	16,508	41.83	−22.93
Liberal	Betsy Hall	12,636	32.02	+3.19
Green	Rob Strang	6,429	16.29	+13.84
New Democratic	Lynda McDougall	3,891	9.86	+5.89
Total valid votes		39,464	100.0	
