= Trillium Gift of Life Network =

Ontario governmental agency

- Réseau Trillium pour le don de vie
- Predecessor: Multi Organ Retrieval and Exchange (MORE)
- Founded at: Toronto, Ontario
- Type: Crown agency
- Legal status: Charity
- Purpose: Medical
- Location(s): 483 Bay Street South Tower, 4th Floor Toronto, ON M5G 2C9
- CEO: Ronnie Gavsie
- Website: www.giftoflife.on.ca

The Trillium Gift of Life Network was an agency of the Government of Ontario responsible for the province's organ donation strategy, promotion, and supply. Ronnie Gavsie was the President & CEO. The agency maintained the BeADonor.ca website. It was subsequently subsumed under Ontario Health in 2019.

== Statistics ==
From 2001 to 2010, kidney and liver waitlists decreased, respectively by 330 and 27 patients. The pancreas waitlist, however, increased by 24 patients since 2001. Heart, lung, and heart with lungs remained moderately stable. These trends are indicated in the Organ wait-list by organ for 2001 to 2010. Transplants from 2001 to 2010, however, indicated an increased trend by 275 operations in deceased and living kidney, kidney pancreas, deceased and living liver, heart and lung transplants. Heart with lung transplants remained stable. These trends are indicated in the Organ transplant by organ for 2001 to 2010.

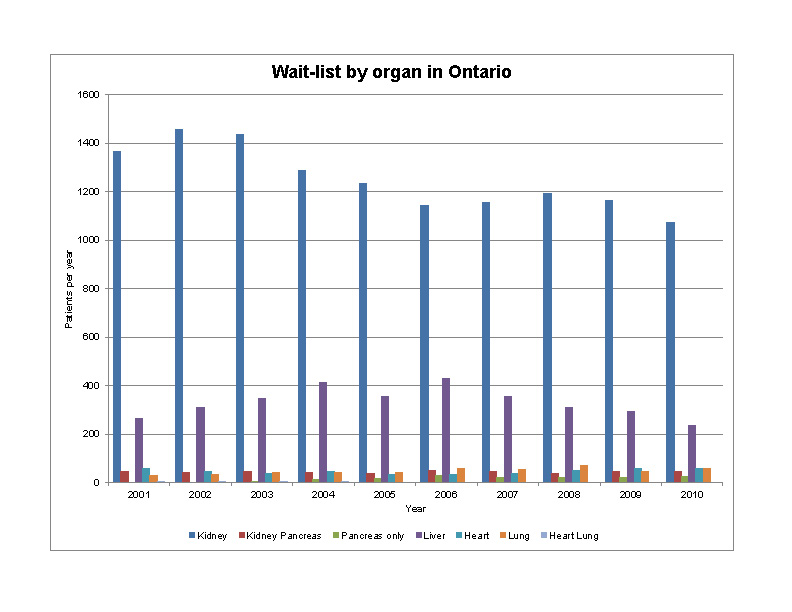
Ontario organ wait-list by organ from 2001 to 2010. Statistics from Trillium Gift of Life.

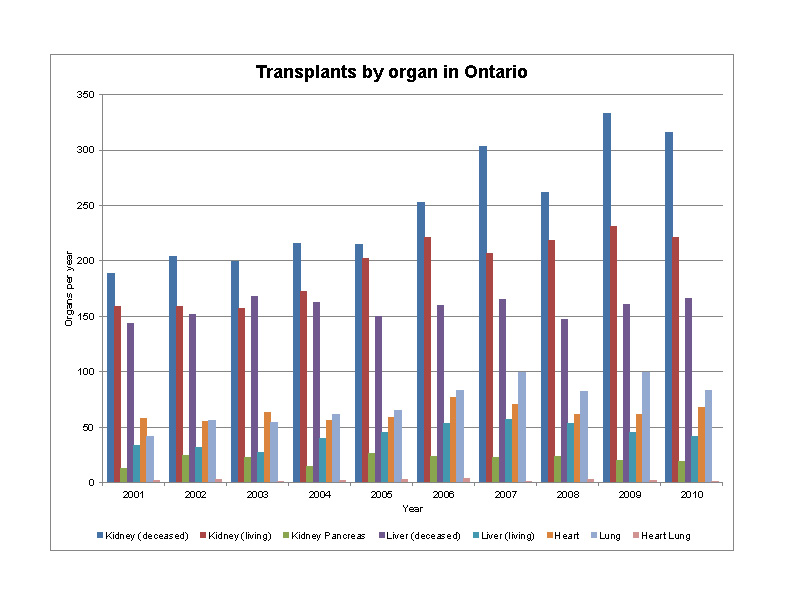
Ontario organ transplant by organ from 2001 to 2010. Statistics from Trillium Gift of Life.

=== Canadian organ wait-list ===
Looking at the statistics for Canada, one can see that there has been an increase in the number of people waiting for a transplant between 2009 and 2010, while between 2008 and 2009 there was a decrease in the number of people on the wait-list.

Canadian organ wait-list
	Total number of patients (2010)	Total number of patients (2009)	Total number of patients (2008)
Canada	4,529	3,796	4,380
Provinces			
British Columbia	373	321	308
Alberta	725	472	620
Saskatchewan	145	161	144
Manitoba	262	177	167
Ontario	1,515	1,229	1,739
Quebec	1,241	1,202	1,159
Nova Scotia	268	234	242

=== Ontario organ transplants ===
Since 2008 there has been a steady increase of people receiving transplants. Comparing the number of transplants performed to the number of people waiting in 2010, there are twice as many people waiting then there is transplants being performed. This may be a sign of what is to come in future years. If the wait-list continues to increase at a faster rate than the number of transplants performed, the demand is not going to meet the supply.

Canadian Organ Transplant performed
	Total Number of patients (2010)	Total Number of Patients (2009)	Total Number of Patients (2008)
Canada	2,153	2,138	2,083
Provinces			
British Columbia	295	211	266
Alberta	342	291	286
Saskatchewan	2	15	35
Manitoba	58	50	53
Ontario	934	980	836
Quebec	411	452	479
Nova Scotia	111	139	128
