= Walker Panel =

The Walker Panel is also known as Ontario's Expert Panel on SARS and Infectious Disease Control. The Panel was established by the Ontario Ministry of Health and Long-Term Care in May 2003. On 15 December 2003 the Panel released its Initial Report, which provided a series of 53 recommendations requiring urgent action. The Final Report of the Walker Panel was released in April 2004. It contained 103 recommendations.

SARS highlighted to the Panel key longstanding shortfalls with respect to infection control, including a need for provincial standards, shortages of necessary human resources and training opportunities, and facility design barriers.

== Members ==
The members of the Expert Panel on SARS and Infectious Disease Control were:

- Dr. David Walker (medical academic), Dean, Faculty of Health Sciences and Director, School of Medicine, Queen’s University (Chair)
- Dr. Wilbert Keon, Chief Executive Officer, University of Ottawa Heart Institute (retired, April 2004) and Senator, Senate of Canada
- Dr. Andreas Laupacis, President and Chief Executive Officer, Institute for Clinical Evaluative Sciences, Toronto
- Dr. Donald Low, Chief of Microbiology, Mount Sinai Hospital, Toronto
- Dr. Kieran Moore, Emergency Room Physician, Sudbury Regional Hospital
- Dr. Jack Kitts, President and Chief Executive Officer, The Ottawa Hospital
- Ms. Leslie Vincent (nurse), Senior Vice President, Nursing, Mount Sinai Hospital, Toronto
- Dr. Robin Williams (paediatrician), Medical Officer of Health, Niagara Region and Clinical Professor, Department of Paediatrics, McMaster University
