= Hybrid fibre-optic =

Hybrid fibre-optic is the connection used by some television studio and field production video cameras that combine all video, audio, data, control, power, and other signals onto two single mode optical fibres and a few copper conductors in one jacket, therefore allowing one cable to provide all the necessary signals a camera needs for the television production environment.
