= Center for research on Children, Adolescents, and the Media =

Dutch research center

The Center for research on Children, Adolescents and the Media (CCAM) at the University of Amsterdam, the Netherlands, was founded in 2005 by Patti Valkenburg. Since then, it has grown into one of the largest research centers in its kind worldwide. CCAM hosts 25 international researchers from 9 academic disciplines. It is part of the Amsterdam School of Communication Research ASCoR. Since 2009, CCAM researchers have organized an international master program on Youth and Media.

== Focus ==
Children and adolescents have become the defining users of media and technologies. Despite a booming media industry aimed at young people, little is known about the uses and effects of these media and technologies. CCAM strives to better understand the role of media in children's and adolescents' lives. What are the intended and unintended effects of advertising? Which children are particularly susceptible to potential negative effects of advertising, pornography, and media violence? When do social media have positive and negative influences on young people? Researchers in CCAM have published dozens of articles and chapters that provide answers on questions like these.

== Open access ==
CCAM has an open access policy. All publications can be downloaded from the publication section. In addition, all instruments that CCAM researchers have created to investigate their theories and models are freely accessible via the website of CCAM.

== Knowledge dissemination ==
Research within CCAM is targeted at an academic audience as well as the public at large. Every three months, the center publishes a news bulletin to inform the broader audience of the latest research insights.

== See also ==
- CCAM website
- CCAM’s publications
