= Newmarket—Aurora (provincial electoral district) =

Provincial electoral district in Ontario, Canada

Coordinates: 44.027°N 79.449°W

Ontario electoral district
- Newmarket—Aurora in relation to southern Ontario ridings

Provincial electoral district
- Legislature: Legislative Assembly of Ontario
MPP
Dawn Gallagher Murphy
Progressive Conservative
- District created: 2006
- First contested: 2007
- Last contested: 2025

Demographics
- Population (2021): 127,134
- Electors (2025): 98,096
- Area (km²): 60
- Pop. density (per km²): 2,118.9
- Census division: York
- Census subdivision(s): Newmarket, Aurora

Newmarket—Aurora is a provincial electoral district in Ontario, Canada, which has been represented in the Legislative Assembly of Ontario since 2007. The district contains the towns of Newmarket and Aurora.

The riding was created for the 2004 federal election by merging 50% of the riding of York North with 24% of the riding of Vaughan—King—Aurora.

According to the 2006 census, 121,924 people are represented in the Ontario Legislature in this riding.

The major industry in the riding is manufacturing, and auto parts maker Magna International is the largest manufacturer. Average family income in the riding is higher than the national average at slightly over $97,000 a year. Unemployment in the riding is lower than the national average at 3.6%.

== Members of Provincial Parliament ==
Newmarket—Aurora
Assembly	Years	Member	Party
Riding created from York North and Vaughan—King—Aurora
39th	2007–2011	Frank Klees	Progressive Conservative
40th	2011–2014	Frank Klees	Progressive Conservative
41st	2014–2018	Chris Ballard	Liberal
42nd	2018–2022	Christine Elliott	Progressive Conservative
43rd	2022–2025	Dawn Gallagher Murphy	Progressive Conservative
44th	2025–present	Dawn Gallagher Murphy	Progressive Conservative

== Election results ==
Winning party in each polling division of Newmarket—Aurora at the 2025 Ontario general election

2025 Ontario general election
Party	Candidate	Votes	%	±%
Progressive Conservative	Dawn Gallagher Murphy	20,260	47.56	+2.59
Liberal	Chris Ballard	17,723	41.60	+10.13
New Democratic	Denis Heng	2,709	6.36	–6.36
Green	David Jakubiec	1,088	2.55	–3.06
New Blue	Shirin Khasbakhi	536	1.26	–2.40
Moderate	Yuri Duboisky	286	0.67	+0.39
Total valid votes		42,602	99.37	
Total rejected, unmarked and declined ballots		269	0.63	+0.10
Turnout		42,871	43.79	–0.62
Eligible voters		97,899		
Progressive Conservative hold		Swing		–3.77
Source: Elections Ontario

Winning party in each polling division of Newmarket—Aurora at the 2022 Ontario general election

2022 Ontario general election
Party	Candidate	Votes	%	±%
Progressive Conservative	Dawn Gallagher Murphy	18,671	44.97	–2.74
Liberal	Sylvain Roy	13,069	31.47	+8.71
New Democratic	Denis Heng	5,281	12.72	–11.13
Green	Carolina Rodriguez	2,332	5.62	+2.04
New Blue	Iwona Czarnecka	1,520	3.66	–
Ontario Party	Krista McKenzie	532	1.28	–
Moderate	Yuri Duboisky	118	0.28	+0.17
Total valid votes		41,523	99.47	
Total rejected, unmarked and declined ballots		220	0.53	–0.46
Turnout		41,743	44.42	–14.56
Eligible voters		93,983		
Progressive Conservative hold		Swing		–5.73
Source: Elections Ontario

2018 Ontario general election
Party	Candidate	Votes	%	±%
Progressive Conservative	Christine Elliott	24,813	47.71	+10.98
New Democratic	Melissa Williams	12,405	23.85	+11.91
Liberal	Chris Ballard	11,840	22.76	–21.36
Green	Michelle Bourdeau	1,859	3.57	–0.47
Independent	Dorian Baxter	447	0.86	–
Trillium	Bob Yaciuk	212	0.41	–
Libertarian	Lori Robbins	192	0.37	–
None of the Above	Denis Van Decker	185	0.36	–
Moderate	Denis Gorlynskiy	60	0.12	–
Total valid votes		52,013	99.01	
Total rejected, unmarked and declined ballots		518	0.99	–0.44
Turnout		52,531	58.97	+5.57
Eligible voters		89,076		
Progressive Conservative notional gain from Liberal		Swing		+16.17
Source: Elections Ontario

2014 general election redistributed results
Party	Vote	%
Liberal	19,062	44.12
Progressive Conservative	15,865	36.72
New Democratic	5,157	11.94
Green	1,749	4.05
Others	1,371	3.17

2014 Ontario general election
Party	Candidate	Votes	%	±%
Liberal	Chris Ballard	22,997	43.94	+8.32
Progressive Conservative	Jane Twinney	19,585	37.42	–9.82
New Democratic	Angus Duff	6,023	11.51	–2.86
Green	Andrew Roblin	2,144	4.10	+1.33
Canadians' Choice	Dorian Baxter	922	1.76	–
Libertarian	Jason Jenkins	579	1.11	–
Trillium	Bob Yaciuk	83	0.16	–
Total valid votes		52,333	98.58	
Total rejected, unmarked and declined ballots		755	1.42	+1.09
Turnout		53,088	53.40	+4.07
Eligible voters		99,407		
Liberal gain from Progressive Conservative		Swing		+9.07
Source: Elections Ontario

2011 Ontario general election
Party	Candidate	Votes	%	±%
Progressive Conservative	Frank Klees	21,425	47.24	+4.53
Liberal	Christina Bisanz	16,154	35.62	–4.12
New Democratic	Robin Wardlaw	6,514	14.36	+7.14
Green	Kristopher Kuysten	1,256	2.77	–6.41
Total valid votes		45,349	99.67	
Total rejected, unmarked and declined ballots		151	0.33	–0.28
Turnout		45,500	49.33	–5.88
Eligible voters		92,231		
Progressive Conservative hold		Swing		+4.32
Source: Elections Ontario

2007 Ontario general election
Party	Candidate	Votes	%	±%
Progressive Conservative	Frank Klees	19,460	42.72	–
Liberal	Christina Bisanz	18,105	39.74	–
Green	John McRogers	4,182	9.18	–
New Democratic	Mike Seaward	3,290	7.22	–
Libertarian	Craig Hodgins	269	0.59	–
Family Coalition	Tad Brudzinski	249	0.55	–
Total valid votes		45,555	99.38	
Total rejected, unmarked and declined ballots		282	0.62	–
Turnout		45,837	55.21	–
Eligible voters		83,023		
Progressive Conservative pickup new district.				
Source: Elections Ontario

== 2007 electoral reform referendum ==
2007 Ontario electoral reform referendum
Side	Votes	%
First Past the Post	29,470	65.9
Mixed member proportional	15,226	34.1
Total valid votes	44,696	100.0

== See also ==
- List of Ontario provincial electoral districts
- Canadian provincial electoral districts

== Sources ==
- Elections Ontario Past Election Results
- Map of riding for 2018 election
