= Certified Community Association Manager =

Certified Community Association Manager (CCAM) is a professional certification in property management earned through the Minnesota Multi-Housing Association (MHA) or the California Association of Community Managers (CACM). Those certified as a CCAM are deemed by the association to have obtained a certain level of professional competence in the management and administration of common interest communities or developments (also called CIDs), which are generally townhome, condominium or homeowner associations or cooperatives.
