= Vaughan—Woodbridge (provincial electoral district) =

Provincial electoral district in Ontario, Canada

Ontario electoral district
- Vaughan—Woodbridge in relation to other Greater Toronto Area districts
- Coordinates: 43.79°N 79.59°W

Provincial electoral district
- Legislature: Legislative Assembly of Ontario
MPP
Michael Tibollo
Progressive Conservative
- District created: 2015
- First contested: 2018
- Last contested: 2025

Demographics
- Population (2016): 105,225
- Electors (2018): 77,426
- Area (km²): 81
- Pop. density (per km²): 1,299.1
- Census division: York
- Census subdivision: Vaughan

Vaughan—Woodbridge is a provincial electoral district in Ontario, Canada. It elects one member to the Legislative Assembly of Ontario. This riding was created in 2015, and is almost entirely contiguous with the large Woodbridge district in the city of Vaughan.

== Members of Provincial Parliament ==
Vaughan—Woodbridge
Assembly	Years	Member	Party
Riding created from Vaughan
42nd	2018–2022	Michael Tibollo	Progressive Conservative
43rd	2022–2025	Michael Tibollo	Progressive Conservative
44th	2025–present	Michael Tibollo	Progressive Conservative

== Election results ==
2025 Ontario general election
Party	Candidate	Votes	%	±%
Progressive Conservative	Michael Tibollo	23,243	65.1	+11.3
Liberal	Hamza Ansari	9,482	26.6	–8.5
New Democratic	Elif Genc	1,479	4.1	–1.3
Green	Philip Piluris	628	1.8	–0.1
New Blue	Pasquale Chiariza	509	1.4	–0.8
Populist	Mario Greco	345	1.0	+0.3
Total valid votes				
Total rejected, unmarked and declined ballots				
Turnout			42.4	–1.6
Eligible voters		84,127		
Progressive Conservative hold		Swing		+5.0
Source: Elections Ontario

2022 Ontario general election
Party	Candidate	Votes	%	±%
Progressive Conservative	Michael Tibollo	19,340	53.78	+3.29
Liberal	Steven Del Duca	12,615	35.08	+3.08
New Democratic	Will McCarty	1,927	5.36	−9.20
New Blue	Luca Mele	802	2.23	
Green	Philip James Piluris	694	1.93	−0.33
Ontario Party	Gerrard Fortin	304	0.85	
Populist	Mario Greco	249	0.69	
Moderate	Walid Omrani	27	0.08	
Total valid votes		35,958	100.0	
Total rejected, unmarked, and declined ballots		242		
Turnout		36,200	44.03	
Eligible voters		81,090		
Progressive Conservative hold		Swing		+0.10
Source(s): "Summary of Valid Votes Cast for Each Candidate" (PDF). Elections Ontario. 2022. Archived from the original on May 18, 2023.; "Statistical Summary by Electoral District" (PDF). Elections Ontario. 2022. Archived from the original on May 21, 2023.

2018 Ontario general election
Party	Candidate	Votes	%	±%
Progressive Conservative	Michael Tibollo	21,687	50.50	+23.49
Liberal	Steven Del Duca	13,742	32.00	-25.99
New Democratic	Sandra Lozano	6,254	14.56	+3.60
Green	Michael DiPasquale	972	2.26	+0.06
Libertarian	Paolo Fabrizio	291	0.68	
Total valid votes		42,946	99.13	
Total rejected, unmarked and declined ballots		378	0.87	
Turnout		43,324	55.96	
Eligible voters		77,426		
Progressive Conservative pickup new district.				
Source: Elections Ontario

== See also ==
- List of Ontario provincial electoral districts
- Canadian provincial electoral districts
