= Cancer Care Ontario =

Agency of the Government of Ontario, Canada

Cancer Care Ontario was an agency of the provincial Government of Ontario that was responsible for improving cancer services. It was created by the government of Bob Rae in April 1995, and was formally launched in 1997. The agency was governed under the provisions of the Cancer Act. It was subsequently subsumed under Ontario Health in 2019.

== See also ==
- BC Cancer Agency
