= Michael Tibollo =

Canadian politician

The Honourable Michael Tibollo ECO MPP
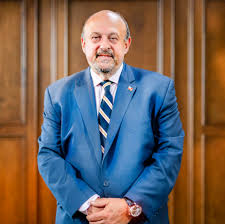
- Tibollo 2025

Associate Attorney General
- Incumbent
- Assumed office March 19, 2025
- Premier: Doug Ford
- Preceded by: Position established

Associate Minister of Mental Health and Addictions
- In office June 20, 2019 – March 19, 2025
- Premier: Doug Ford
- Preceded by: Position established
- Succeeded by: Vijay Thanigasalam

Minister of Tourism, Culture, and Sport
- In office November 5, 2018 – June 20, 2019
- Premier: Doug Ford
- Preceded by: Sylvia Jones
- Succeeded by: Lisa MacLeod

Minister of Community Safety and Correctional Services
- In office June 29, 2018 – November 5, 2018
- Premier: Doug Ford
- Preceded by: Marie-France Lalonde
- Succeeded by: Sylvia Jones

Member of the Ontario Provincial Parliament for Vaughan—Woodbridge
- Incumbent
- Assumed office June 7, 2018
- Preceded by: Steven Del Duca

Personal details
- Born: February 11, 1960 (age 66) Toronto, Ontario, Canada
- Party: Progressive Conservative
- Spouse: Silvana Tibollo
- Education: University of Toronto; University of Windsor Faculty of Law
- Occupation: Lawyer

Michael A. Tibollo ECO MPP (born February 11, 1960) is a Canadian politician in Ontario, who is currently serving as Associate Attorney General. He was elected to the Legislative Assembly of Ontario in the 2018 provincial election. representing the riding of Vaughan—Woodbridge as a member of the Progressive Conservative Party of Ontario. He first served as Minister of Community Safety and Correctional Services, now known as Solicitor General. He then went on to serve as Minister of Tourism, Culture, and Sport from 2018 to 2019. Following this, he went on to become the first Minister to hold the portfolio as Minister responsible for Mental Health and Addictions for the Province of Ontario.

== Background and education ==
Tibollo was born and raised in Toronto, Ontario. He is an alumnus of St. Michael's College School in Toronto, Ontario. He attended the University of Toronto where he received his undergraduate degree in 1982. He then obtained a law degree from the University of Windsor in 1985. Tibollo was called to the bar of the Law Society of Upper Canada in 1987. In 1995, Tibollo completed the program of instruction for lawyers: negotiation workshop at Harvard Law School.

Tibollo has received numerous awards for his career and community involvement, including:

- 2017: CHIN Radio/TV International, CHIN Radio/TV International Salutes Canada 150 with ethno-cultural honourees who have enriched and helped build a strong and vibrant Canadian society
- 2015: Order of the Republic of Italy, Knight
- 2013: National Congress of Italian Canadians - Toronto District, Order of Merit Award
- 2012: Queen's Jubilee, Government of Canada 125 Medal, Recipient
- 2009: Government of the Province of Foggia, Italy, Humanitarian Award
- 2005: Canadian Italian Business and Professional Association, Professional Excellence Award

== Career ==
Tibollo was formerly the principal at Tibollo and Associates Professional Corporation and has been a practising lawyer for the last 30 years. The law firm is located in Woodbridge, Ontario.

In May 2017, Tibollo announced his intention to seek the PC candidate nomination for the provincial riding of Vaughan—Woodbridge. He later won against former Ontario Liberal Minister Steven Del Duca.

Tibollo is the honorary chairman of the Caritas School of Life, a residential therapeutic community that provides services to men suffering from mental health and addictions problems.

Tibollo was instrumental in creating Italian Heritage Month and is the founder of the Festival of Light, an annual multicultural festival celebrating diversity of culture and religion in Canada.

Tibollo won re-election in 2022, running against Del Duca, who was voted Ontario Liberal Party leader in 2020.

== Electoral record ==
2025 Ontario general election: Vaughan—Woodbridge
Party	Candidate	Votes	%	±%
Progressive Conservative	Michael Tibollo	23,243	65.1	+11.3
Liberal	Hamza Ansari	9,482	26.6	–8.5
New Democratic	Elif Genc	1,479	4.1	–1.3
Green	Philip Piluris	628	1.8	–0.1
New Blue	Pasquale Chiariza	509	1.4	–0.8
Populist	Mario Greco	345	1.0	+0.3
Total valid votes				
Total rejected, unmarked and declined ballots				
Turnout			42.4	–1.6
Eligible voters		84,127		
Progressive Conservative hold		Swing		+5.0
Source: Elections Ontario

2022 Ontario general election: Vaughan—Woodbridge
Party	Candidate	Votes	%	±%
Progressive Conservative	Michael Tibollo	19,340	53.78	+3.29
Liberal	Steven Del Duca	12,615	35.08	+3.08
New Democratic	Will McCarty	1,927	5.36	−9.20
New Blue	Luca Mele	802	2.23	
Green	Philip James Piluris	694	1.93	−0.33
Ontario Party	Gerrard Fortin	304	0.85	
Populist	Mario Greco	249	0.69	
Moderate	Walid Omrani	27	0.08	
Total valid votes		35,958	100.0	
Total rejected, unmarked, and declined ballots		242		
Turnout		36,200	44.03	
Eligible voters		81,090		
Progressive Conservative hold		Swing		+0.10
Source(s): "Summary of Valid Votes Cast for Each Candidate" (PDF). Elections Ontario. 2022. Archived from the original on 2023-05-18.; "Statistical Summary by Electoral District" (PDF). Elections Ontario. 2022. Archived from the original on 2023-05-21.

2018 Ontario general election: Vaughan—Woodbridge
Party	Candidate	Votes	%	±%
Progressive Conservative	Michael Tibollo	21,687	50.50	+23.49
Liberal	Steven Del Duca	13,742	32.00	-25.99
New Democratic	Sandra Lozano	6,254	14.56	+3.60
Green	Michael DiPasquale	972	2.26	+0.06
Libertarian	Paolo Fabrizio	291	0.68	
Total valid votes		42,946	99.13	
Total rejected, unmarked and declined ballots		378	0.87	
Turnout		43,324	55.96	
Eligible voters		77,426		
Progressive Conservative pickup new district.				
Source: Elections Ontario

== Cabinet positions ==
Ford ministry, Province of Ontario (2018–present)
Cabinet posts (3)
Predecessor	Office	Successor
Position created	Associate Minister of Mental Health and Addictions; June 20, 2019 - March 19, 2025	Vijay Thanigasalam
Sylvia Jones	Minister of Tourism, Culture, and Sport; November 5, 2018 – June 20, 2019	Lisa MacLeod
Marie-France Lalonde	Minister of Community Safety and Correctional Services; June 29, 2018 – November 5, 2018	Sylvia Jones
