= Ontario Health =

Crown agency of the Government of Ontario

Agency overview
- Preceding agencies: Cancer Care Ontario; eHealth Ontario; Trillium Gift of Life Network; Health Quality Ontario; HealthForceOntario; Health Shared Services Ontario; 14 Local Health Integration Networks (LHINs)
- Type: Crown agency
- Jurisdiction: Government of Ontario
- Headquarters: Toronto, Ontario
- Minister responsible: Sylvia Jones, Minister of Health
- Agency executives: Matthew Anderson, President and Chief Executive Officer; Bill Hatanaka, Chair
- Parent ministry: Ministry of Health
- Key document: Connecting Care Act, 2019
- Website: www.ontariohealth.ca

Ontario Health (OH) is a Crown agency of the Government of Ontario. Described as a "super agency", Ontario Health oversees much of the administration of the Ontario healthcare system, with the stated goal of integrating services split between organizations.

Since its foundation, Ontario Health has evolved into a centralized entity overseeing the coordination of Ontario's health services. The 2022–2023 Annual Report highlights the agency's role in pandemic recovery and system transformation, working closely with partners to streamline care access, balance resources, and accelerate initiatives across sectors. The agency is responsible for implementing system-wide initiatives to improve quality, equity, and access to care across sectors including hospital services, long-term care, home and community care, and mental health and addictions.

== Background ==
Introduced by the Progressive Conservative (PC) government of Premier Doug Ford, as the Health Program Initiatives, the agency's mandate is defined in the Connecting Care Act, 2019, and through memorandums of understanding, mandate and strategic priorities letters and other documents from the ministry of health.

The agency is to absorb and administer or has absorbed and administers several components of the Ontario healthcare system, including:

- Cancer Care Ontario
- eHealth Ontario
- Trillium Gift of Life Network
- Health Quality Ontario
- HealthForceOntario
- Ontario Telemedicine Network (OTN)
- Health Shared Services Ontario
- the 14 Local Health Integration Networks (LHINs)/ Home and Community Care Support Services

Services such as human resources and communications will be centralized in the new agency.

=== Financial impact ===
The province expects to save $350 million a year by 2021–22, but University of Ottawa professor Doug Angus cautioned that a similar approach was introduced in Alberta, which has the highest per capita healthcare spending in the country. The New Democratic Party also raised concerns, with Member of Provincial Parliament (MPP) France Gelinas noting that "In British Columbia and in Alberta, health centralization wasted billions of dollars".

Healthcare spending was heavily debated during the Ontario 2018 election, with Ford's Conservatives committing to end "hallway health care". However, the introduction of the Ontario Health Agency has also been criticized in the National Post by Randall Denley—a former provincial Conservative politician who ran in 2011 and 2014—as wasting "time, money and energy on reshaping the health bureaucracy" rather than "specific solutions to well-identified problems."

== Ontario Health Teams ==
As of January 2024, the government of Ontario in partnership with Ontario Health approved the 58th Ontario Health Team, completing full provincial coverage and ensuring every part of Ontario is served by an OHT

These teams are composed of diverse care providers—such as hospitals, primary care physicians, home and community care providers, mental health and addictions services, long-term care homes, and more—working collaboratively as a unified network

=== Role ===
OHTs are voluntary collaborations between health service providers. In their applications for designation as OHT’s, the potential teams must describe how they will integrate services for a regional population and how they will ensure “warm handovers” for patients making transitions in the system.

Ontario Health Teams continue to provide:

- Integrated patient care networks: sharing a unified record and care plan.
- Patient navigation: including online and 24/7 telephone services, in coordination with Health811
- Performance measurement: guided by updated frameworks and KPIs to assess progress, particularly those piloted by the Initial 12 OHTs

=== Home care pilot ===
- A core group of 12 OHTs was selected to accelerate the delivery of home care services beginning in 2025. These teams will pioneer integrated care models to support transitions for people with chronic conditions across primary care, hospital, and community settings.
- The selected OHTs include: All Nations Health Partners; Burlington; Couchiching; Durham; East Toronto Health Partners; Frontenac, Lennox & Addington; Greater Hamilton Health Network; Middlesex London; Mississauga; Nipissing Wellness; Noojmawing Sookatagaing; and North York Toronto Health Partners.

=== Criticism ===
The introduction of OHTs has been criticized for lack of direction from the Ministry of Health, making it unclear the role they will play in delivering or standardizing services. Critics say the government has been overly vague in defining a role for OHTs and question the effectiveness of overseeing over 50 different OHTs, saying it will be overly complex compared to the previous system of 14 LHINs, as well as eliminating their regional focus. Bob Bell, a former physician and University Health Network CEO who served as deputy health minister, who claims that "Given the lack of clear direction coming from the ministry, OHTs seem at risk of creating a fragmented, chaotic approach to provincial health service planning", specifically questioning the effect they will have on home-care services, which were previously standardized under the LHIN system, stating: "work done in developing a standard provincial foundation for homecare will be lost".

== Ontario Health atHome ==
Ontario Health atHome is a government agency in Ontario. It is separate from Ontario Health. It was created in 2024, and was preceded by Home and Community Care Support Services.

=== Supplies controversy ===
In October 2024, Ontario Health atHome had a scandal where they failed to procure medical supplies for patients. Ontario Health atHome began offering rebates to people who had to purchase supplies out of pocket. This failure stemmed from a contract Ontario Health atHome had with Bayshore.

As a result of the failure, Cynthia Martineau, Ontario Health atHome's CEO was fired. Ontario ended up spending ended $219K on reimbursements.

== Digital Health and Innovation ==
=== Initiatives & Programs ===
Ontario Health leads several digital health programs and innovation initiatives:

- Patients Before Paperwork: A flagship program to modernize administrative workflows—e.g., digitizing referrals, prescriptions, and lab results—to enhance provider efficiency and patient care Ontario Health.
- Digital Health Programs: Includes Virtual Care, eHealth modernization, cybersecurity (Ontario Health Cyber Security Centre), and strategic oversight of digital transformation efforts Ontario Health.

=== Ontario Centre of Innovation (OCI) Collaborations ===
Through the Innovating Digital Health Solutions Program, Ontario funded 13 pilot digital health projects (Sept 2023–Mar 2024), generating:

- $3.62 M in cost savings
- 13 digital implementations serving 28,000+ users
- Process efficiencies and economic benefits, aligning with the “Digital First for Health” strategy

== Governance ==
Presidents and chief executive officers
No.	Name	Start date	End date	Minister	Reference
1	Matthew Anderson	February 1, 2020	incumbent	Christine Elliot	

Board chairs
No.	Name	Start date	End date	Minister	Reference
1	Bill Hatanaka	February 2019	incumbent	Christine Elliot	

=== Transparency concerns ===
The government was criticized for the lack of consultation when introducing the Ontario Health Agency.

Concerns were raised regarding the agency's board meetings, which were initially held with no advance notice or invitation to the public. While open meetings were a legislative requirement for local health integration networks, no such legislation compels Ontario Health to hold open meetings.

== See also ==
- Ministry of Health (Ontario)
- Ministry of Long-term Care
- Healthcare in Canada
- Ontario Health Insurance Plan (OHIP)
