= Ministry of Health (Ontario) =

Canadian provincial ministry

- Ministère de la Santé (French)
- Government of Ontario wordmark

Ministry overview
- Formed: 1882 (current name since June 20, 2019)
- Preceding Ministry: Ministry of Health and Long-Term Care
- Jurisdiction: Government of Ontario
- Headquarters: 777 Bay Street Toronto, Ontario, Canada
- Ministers responsible: Sylvia Jones, Minister of Health; Michelle Cooper, Associate Minister of Mental Health and Addictions
- Child Ministry: Ontario Health
- Website: ontario.ca/ministry-health

The Ministry of Health is the Government of Ontario ministry responsible for administering the health care system in the Canadian province of Ontario. The ministry is responsible to the Ontario Legislature through the minister of health, presently Sylvia Jones since June 24, 2022.

== Services and programs ==
- Ontario Health Insurance Plan (OHIP)
- Ontario Drug Benefit Program - prescription drug coverage
- Community and public health through Public Health Ontario
- Ontario Health agency
- Health811

The ministry also regulates hospitals, operates some medical laboratories and regulates others, and co-ordinates emergency medical services for the province.

The ministry once operated ambulance services outside of major cities in Ontario, but the services were downloaded to municipalities around 1998.

== History ==
In the early years of Canadian Confederation, health was still considered primarily a municipal rather than provincial matter. The Public Health Act of 1873 permitted the Lieutenant Governor to establish, by proclamation, a temporary "Central Board of Health" to deal with disease if it reached epidemic proportions. However, no proclamations were ever made, and a Central Board was never established.

The Provincial Board of Health was established on March 10, 1882, and it was charged with overseeing the many local health boards. It also assumed the responsibility of dealing with an epidemic, if one should arise. The board reported to the Lieutenant Governor (1882-1903), to the Provincial Secretary (1904-1918), then to the Department of Labour (1919-1924).

In 1924, the Provincial Board of Health was replaced by the Department of Health. In 1930, the department accepted from the Department of the Provincial Secretary the responsibilities for administering Ontario's psychiatric hospitals and inspecting the province's public and private hospitals. Also in 1930, the Department of Hospitals was established under the direction of the first Minister of Health; that department became a division of the Department of Health in 1934. In 1952, cancer research and the operation of cancer clinics was added to the department's responsibilities. Insured hospital services and insured physicians' services, introduced in 1959 and 1966 respectively, were combined under the Ontario Health Insurance Plan (OHIP) in 1972. The department also had responsibility over areas that are no longer associated with health, such as water and sewage functions (prior to 1957), intellectual disability facilities and children's services (transferred to the Ministry of Community and Social Services in 1974), and occupational health (transferred to the Ministry of Labour in 1976).

In 1961, the Royal Commission on Health Services, chaired by Justice Emmett Matthew Hall, was appointed, which served as a catalyst for a major overhaul of the department.

In 1972, the Department of Health was renamed the Ministry of Health in a government-wide restructuring. In 1999, the Ministry of Health was renamed the Ministry of Health and Long-Term Care. In 2011, the Ministry of Health Promotion and Sport was combined with the Ministry. On June 20, 2019, the Ministry of Health and Long-Term Care was split into the Ministry of Health and the Ministry of Long-Term Care. The Ministry of Health retained responsibility for most of the health care system, but the Ministry of Long-Term care is responsible for long-term care homes and placements.

== List of ministers ==
Name	Term of office		Tenure	Name	Term of Office		Tenure	Political party (Ministry)	Note
Ministers of Health				Other Ministers					
Dr. Forbes Godfrey	April 17, 1924	September 16, 1930	6 years, 152 days					Conservative (Ferguson)	
John Robb	September 16, 1930	December 15, 1930	3 years, 297 days					Conservative (Ferguson)	
John Robb	December 15, 1930	July 10, 1934	3 years, 297 days					Conservative (Henry)	
Dr. James Faulkner	July 10, 1934	October 12, 1937	3 years, 94 days					Liberal (Hepburn)	
Harold Kirby	October 12, 1937	October 21, 1942	5 years, 309 days					Liberal (Hepburn)	Concurrently Minister of Public Welfare (October 27, 1942 – May 18, 1943)
Harold Kirby	October 21, 1942	May 18, 1943	5 years, 309 days					Liberal (Conant)	Concurrently Minister of Public Welfare (October 27, 1942 – May 18, 1943)
Harold Kirby	May 18, 1943	August 17, 1943	5 years, 309 days					Liberal (Nixon)	Concurrently Minister of Public Welfare (October 27, 1942 – May 18, 1943)
Dr. Percy Vivian	August 17, 1943	January 7, 1946	2 years, 143 days					PC (Drew)	Concurrently Minister of Public Welfare
Russell Kelley	January 7, 1946	October 19, 1948	4 years, 213 days					PC (Drew)	
Russell Kelley	October 19, 1948	May 4, 1949	4 years, 213 days					PC (Kennedy)	
Russell Kelley	May 4, 1949	August 8, 1950	4 years, 213 days					PC (Frost)	
Dr. Mac Phillips	August 8, 1950	December 22, 1958	8 years, 136 days					PC (Frost)	
Dr. Matthew Dymond	December 22, 1958	November 8, 1961	10 years, 234 days					PC (Frost)	
Dr. Matthew Dymond	November 8, 1961	August 13, 1969	10 years, 234 days					PC (Robarts)	
Tom Wells	August 13, 1969	March 1, 1971	1 year, 200 days					PC (Robarts)	
Albert Lawrence	March 1, 1971	February 2, 1972	338 days					PC (Davis)	
Dr. Richard Potter	February 2, 1972	February 26, 1974	2 years, 24 days					PC (Davis)	
Frank Miller	February 26, 1974	February 3, 1977	2 years, 343 days					PC (Davis)	
Dennis Timbrell	February 3, 1977	February 13, 1982	5 years, 10 days					PC (Davis)	
Larry Grossman	February 13, 1982	July 6, 1983	1 year, 143 days					PC (Davis)	
Keith Norton	July 6, 1983	February 8, 1985	1 year, 217 days					PC (Davis)	Intergovernmental Affairs Minister Tom Wells served as acting minister while Norton was on sick leave (October 11 to December 5, 1983)
Alan Pope	February 8, 1985	May 17, 1985	98 days					PC (Miller)	
Philip Andrewes	May 17, 1985	June 26, 1985	40 days					PC (Miller)	
Murray Elston	June 26, 1985	September 29, 1987	2 years, 95 days					Liberal (Peterson)	
Elinor Caplan	September 29, 1987	October 1, 1990	3 years, 2 days					Liberal (Peterson)	Mother of later minister David Caplan (2008–09)
Evelyn Gigantes	October 1, 1990	April 19, 1991	200 days					NDP (Rae)	Resigned after inadvertently revealing the name of a Toronto man who had been sent to the United States for drug treatment that wasn't offered in the province.
Frances Lankin	April 22, 1991	February 3, 1993	1 year, 287 days					NDP (Rae)	
Ruth Grier	February 3, 1993	June 26, 1995	2 years, 143 days					NDP (Rae)	
Jim Wilson	June 26, 1995	December 9, 1996	1 year, 166 days (first instance)					PC (Harris)	Resigned for ministerial responsibility (his aide improperly disclosed confidential health information to a reporter), reinstated after conclusion of investigation.
David Johnson	December 9, 1996	February 21, 1997	74 days					PC (Harris)	Interim Minister, while Chair of the Management Board of Cabinet
Jim Wilson	February 21, 1997	October 10, 1997	231 days (second instance); 2 years, 32 days in total	Minister of Long-Term Care				PC (Harris)	
Elizabeth Witmer	October 10, 1997	June 17, 1999	3 years, 120 days	Cam Jackson	July 27, 1998	June 17, 1999	325 days	PC (Harris)	
Ministers of Health and Long-Term Care			3 years, 120 days					PC (Harris)	
Elizabeth Witmer	June 17, 1999	February 7, 2001	3 years, 120 days					PC (Harris)	
Tony Clement	February 8, 2001	April 15, 2002	2 years, 256 days					PC (Harris)	Helen Johns (February 8, 2001 – April 14, 2002) & Dan Newman (April 15, 2002 – October 22, 2003) served as Associate Ministers
Tony Clement	April 15, 2002	October 22, 2003	2 years, 256 days	Minister of Health Promotion				PC (Eves)	
George Smitherman	October 23, 2003	June 20, 2008	4 years, 241 days	Jim Watson	June 29, 2005	October 30, 2007	2 years, 123 days	Liberal (McGuinty)	Smitherman is also Deputy Premier (September 22, 2006 - November 9, 2009)
George Smitherman	October 23, 2003	June 20, 2008	4 years, 241 days	Margarett Best	October 30, 2007	October 20, 2011	3 years, 355 days	Liberal (McGuinty)	Smitherman is also Deputy Premier (September 22, 2006 - November 9, 2009)
David Caplan	June 20, 2008	October 7, 2009	1 year, 109 days	Margarett Best	October 30, 2007	October 20, 2011	3 years, 355 days	Liberal (McGuinty)	Son of previous minister Elinor Caplan (1987–90)
Deb Matthews	October 7, 2009	February 11, 2013	4 years, 260 days	Margarett Best	October 30, 2007	October 20, 2011	3 years, 355 days	Liberal (McGuinty)	While Deputy Premier (February 11, 2013 - January 17, 2018)
Deb Matthews	February 11, 2013	June 24, 2014	4 years, 260 days					Liberal (Wynne)	While Deputy Premier (February 11, 2013 - January 17, 2018)
Dr. Eric Hoskins	June 24, 2014	February 26, 2018	3 years, 247 days					Liberal (Wynne)	Dipika Damerla served as Associate Minister (Long-Term Care and Wellness) (June 24, 2014 – June 13, 2016)
Dr. Helena Jaczek	February 26, 2018	June 29, 2018	123 days					Liberal (Wynne)	While Chair of Cabinet
Christine Elliott	June 29, 2018	June 20, 2019	3 years, 360 days					PC (Ford)	While Deputy Premier
Ministers of Health			3 years, 360 days	Minister of Long-Term Care				PC (Ford)	
Christine Elliott	June 20, 2019	June 24, 2022	3 years, 360 days	Merrilee Fullerton	June 20, 2019	June 18, 2021	1 year, 363 days	PC (Ford)	Elliott is Deputy Premier; Michael Tibollo is Associate Minister of Mental Health and Addictions, from June 20, 2019 to May 3, 2022 and for 2 years, 317 days
Christine Elliott	June 20, 2019	June 24, 2022	3 years, 360 days	Rod Philips	June 18, 2021	January 14, 2022	210 days	PC (Ford)	Elliott is Deputy Premier; Michael Tibollo is Associate Minister of Mental Health and Addictions, from June 20, 2019 to May 3, 2022 and for 2 years, 317 days
Christine Elliott	June 20, 2019	June 24, 2022	3 years, 360 days	Paul Calandra	January 14, 2022	September 4, 2023	1 year, 235 days	PC (Ford)	While Government House Leader
Sylvia Jones	June 24, 2022		4 years, 100 days	Paul Calandra	January 14, 2022	September 4, 2023	1 year, 235 days	PC (Ford)	While Government House Leader
Sylvia Jones	June 24, 2022		4 years, 100 days	Stan Cho	September 4, 2023	June 6, 2024	276 days	PC (Ford)	Jones is Deputy Premier; Michael Tibollo is Associate Minister of Mental Health and Addictions, from May 3, 2022 to March 19, 2025 and for 2 years, 320 days
Sylvia Jones	June 24, 2022		4 years, 100 days	Natalia Kusendova-Bashta	June 6, 2024		2 years, 118 days	PC (Ford)	Jones is Deputy Premier; Michael Tibollo is Associate Minister of Mental Health and Addictions, from May 3, 2022 to March 19, 2025 and for 2 years, 320 days

== See also ==
- Walker Panel
