= Local Health Integration Networks =

Local Health Integration Networks (LHINs) were the health authorities responsible for regional administration of public healthcare services in the Canadian province of Ontario. Legacy LHIN functions were transferred to the new Ontario Health and the LHIN business name was changed to Home and Community Care Support Services.

Created on April 1, 2007, the 14 LHINs were mandated with planning, integrating and distributing provincial funding for all public healthcare services at a regional level. LHINs were locally based associations of the various health service providers, intended to generate enhanced community engagement.

== Services ==
LHINs were community-based, non-profit organizations funded by the Ontario Ministry of Health and Long-Term Care to plan, fund and coordinate services delivered by:

- Hospitals
- Long-Term Care Homes
- Home and Community Care (formerly provided by Community Care Access Centres (CCACs))
- Community Support Service Agencies
- Mental Health and Addiction Agencies
- Community Health Centres (CHCs)

== List ==
There were 14 LHINs:

- Erie St. Clair LHIN
- South West LHIN
- Waterloo Wellington LHIN
- Hamilton Niagara Haldimand Brant LHIN
- Central West LHIN
- Mississauga Halton LHIN
- Toronto Central LHIN
- Central LHIN
- Central East LHIN
- South East LHIN
- Champlain LHIN
- North Simcoe Muskoka LHIN
- North East Local Health Integration Network|North East LHIN
- North West LHIN

== See also ==
- Community Care Access Centres

== External links and further reading ==
- Source, Ontario Ministry of Health and Long-Term Care
- Understanding LHINs: A Review of the Health System Integration Act and the Integrated Health Services (CRNCC and OCSA)
- LHINs—Local Health Integration Networks (Auditor General of Ontario)
- Local Health Integration Networks Report on Information to Date – May 4, 2005 (CUPE)
