= Brampton West (provincial electoral district) =

Provincial electoral district in Ontario, Canada

Coordinates: 43.693°N 79.840°W

Ontario electoral district
- Location in Brampton

Provincial electoral district
- Legislature: Legislative Assembly of Ontario
MPP
Amarjot Sandhu
Progressive Conservative
- District created: 2004
- First contested: 2007
- Last contested: 2025

Demographics
- Population (2016): 130,005
- Electors (2018): 80,196
- Area (km²): 58
- Pop. density (per km²): 2,241.5
- Census division: Peel
- Census subdivision: Brampton

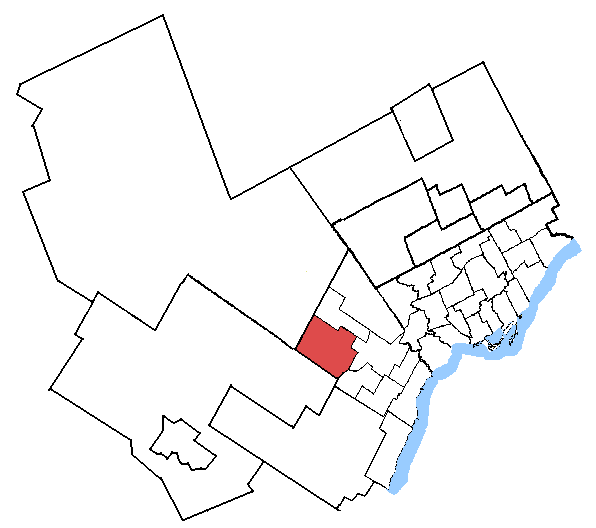
Brampton West 2003 to 2015

Brampton West is a provincial electoral district in central Ontario, Canada. It was created for the 2007 provincial election. 72.8% of the district was created from Brampton West—Mississauga while 27.2% was carved from Brampton Centre.

The riding includes that part of Brampton west of a line following Hurontario Street to Vodden Street to Kennedy Road.

== Members of Provincial Parliament ==
Brampton West
Assembly	Years	Member	Party
Riding created from Brampton West—Mississauga and Brampton Centre
39th	2007–2011	Vic Dhillon	Liberal
40th	2011–2014	Vic Dhillon	Liberal
41st	2014–2018	Vic Dhillon	Liberal
42nd	2018–2022	Amarjot Sandhu	Progressive Conservative
43rd	2022–2025	Amarjot Sandhu	Progressive Conservative
44th	2025–present	Amarjot Sandhu	Progressive Conservative

== Election results ==
Winning party in each polling division of Brampton West at the 2025 Ontario general election

2025 Ontario general election
Party	Candidate	Votes	%	±%
Progressive Conservative	Amarjot Sandhu	19,028	56.58	+8.74
Liberal	Andrew Kania	10,933	32.51	+6.27
New Democratic	Samuel Sarjeant	1,981	5.89	–14.86
Green	Ethan Russell	877	2.61	–0.16
New Blue	David Pardy	554	1.65	–0.01
Independent	Pushpek Sidhu	260	0.77	–
Total valid votes		33,633	99.54	
Total rejected, unmarked and declined ballots		157	0.46	–0.01
Turnout		33,790	34.77	+0.58
Eligible voters		97,171		
Progressive Conservative hold		Swing		+1.23
Source: Elections Ontario

Winning party in each polling division of Brampton West at the 2022 Ontario general election

2022 Ontario general election
Party	Candidate	Votes	%	±%	Expenditures
Progressive Conservative	Amarjot Sandhu	14,751	47.84	+8.45	$98,809
Liberal	Rimmy Jhajj	8,089	26.23	+7.76	$113,178
New Democratic	Navjit Kaur	6,398	20.75	–17.35	$78,343
Green	Pauline Thornham	854	2.77	+0.14	$0
New Blue	David Pardy	511	1.66	–	$0
Ontario Party	Manjot Sekhon	233	0.76	–	$706
Total valid votes/expense limit		30,836	99.53	–	$126,364
Total rejected, unmarked and declined ballots		147	0.47	–0.23	
Turnout		30,983	34.19	–13.48	
Eligible voters		90,617			
Progressive Conservative hold		Swing		+0.35	
Source: Elections Ontario

2018 Ontario general election
Party	Candidate	Votes	%	±%
Progressive Conservative	Amarjot Sandhu	14,951	39.39	+15.05
New Democratic	Jagroop Singh	14,461	38.09	+14.44
Liberal	Vic Dhillon	7,013	18.47	–26.76
Green	Julie Guillemet-Ackerman	999	2.63	–0.11
Libertarian	David Shaw	364	0.96	–0.64
Communist	Surjit Sahota	173	0.46	–
Total valid votes		37,961	99.30	
Total rejected, unmarked and declined ballots		268	0.70	–1.00
Turnout		38,229	47.67	+5.17
Eligible voters		80,196		
Progressive Conservative gain from Liberal		Swing		+20.91
Source: Elections Ontario

2014 Ontario general election
Party	Candidate	Votes	%	±%
Liberal	Vic Dhillon	24,832	45.23	+1.47
Progressive Conservative	Randeep Sandhu	13,363	24.34	–8.52
New Democratic	Gugni Gill Panaich	12,985	23.65	+4.69
Green	Sayyeda Ebrahim	1,504	2.74	–0.52
Libertarian	Luis Chacin	878	1.60	–
Family Coalition	Dan Sullivan	800	1.46	–
Freedom	Ted Harlson	540	0.98	–0.18
Total valid votes		54,902	98.30	
Total rejected, unmarked and declined ballots		952	1.70	+1.10
Turnout		55,854	42.50	+4.21
Eligible voters		131,434		
Liberal hold		Swing		+4.99
Source: Elections Ontario

2011 Ontario general election
Party	Candidate	Votes	%	±%
Liberal	Vic Dhillon	19,224	43.76	–2.43
Progressive Conservative	Ben Shenouda	14,434	32.86	–0.81
New Democratic	Dalbir Singh Kathuria	8,331	18.96	+8.05
Green	Patti Chmelyk	1,432	3.26	–4.47
Freedom	Ted Harlson	509	1.16	–
Total valid votes		43,930	99.40	
Total rejected, unmarked and declined ballots		267	0.60	–0.43
Turnout		44,197	38.29	–5.63
Eligible voters		115,431		
Liberal hold		Swing		–0.81
Source: Elections Ontario

2007 Ontario general election
Party	Candidate	Votes	%
Liberal	Vic Dhillon	20,746	46.19
Progressive Conservative	Mark Beckles	15,120	33.67
New Democratic	Garth Bobb	4,901	10.91
Green	Sanjeev Goel	3,471	7.73
Family Coalition	Norah Madden	488	1.09
Independent	Gurdial Singh Fiji	185	0.41
Total valid votes		44,911	98.96
Total rejected, unmarked and declined ballots		471	1.04
Turnout		45,382	43.92
Eligible voters		103,323	
Liberal pickup new district.			
Source: Elections Ontario

== 2007 electoral reform referendum ==
2007 Ontario electoral reform referendum
Side	Votes	%
First Past the Post	25,767	60.7
Mixed member proportional	16,687	39.3
Total valid votes	42,454	100.0

== See also ==
- List of Ontario provincial electoral districts
- Canadian provincial electoral districts
