= Amarjot Sandhu =

Canadian politician

Amarjot Sandhu MPP
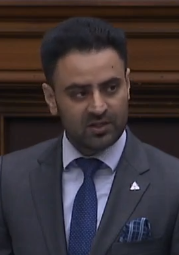
- Sandhu in 2020

Member of the Ontario Provincial Parliament for Brampton West
- Incumbent
- Assumed office June 7, 2018
- Preceded by: Vic Dhillon

Government Caucus Chair
- Incumbent
- Assumed office September 28, 2026
- Preceded by: Matthew Rae

Parliamentary Assistant to the Minister of Infrastructure
- Incumbent
- Assumed office April 07, 2025

Personal details
- Born: Punjab, India
- Party: Progressive Conservative
- Occupation: Computer Engineer, Network Analyst, Realtor

Amarjot Sandhu MPP (Punjabi: ਅਮਰਜੋਤ ਸੰਧੂ) is a Canadian politician. He is a Progressive Conservative member of the Legislative Assembly of Ontario who was elected in 2018 who represents the riding of Brampton West.

Amarjot Sandhu was born in Punjab, India. He arrived in Canada in 2008 as an international student and went to George Brown College in Toronto. He later became a realtor with Royal LePage in Brampton. Amarjot Sandhu is the Member of the Provincial Parliament for the riding of Brampton West and the Parliamentary Assistant to the Minister of Infrastructure. He was also the Chairman of the Standing Committee on Finance and Economic Affairs from 2019 to 2021. He is currently a member of the Standing Committee on Government Agencies and the Standing Committee on Procedure and House Affairs.

He is the first international student to be elected as a representative to the Legislative Assembly of Ontario. He currently resides in his riding of Brampton West with his wife and two kids.

== Early and personal life ==
Sandhu came to Canada as an international student and pursued his studies in Ontario. As a student in Canada, he founded the International Students’ Federation. After graduation, he worked as a computer engineer and a network analyst. Later, he worked as a realtor in the community of Brampton before eventually being elected as a MPP.

Amarjot pursued his education graduating from George Brown College with a post-graduate in wireless networking program. While pursuing his education Amarjot had to work multiple jobs on the side such as, driving a truck and working in a factory. Upon completing his education Amarjot worked as a computer engineer, a network analyst, and a realtor for Royal Lepage, before finally being elected as a Member of Provincial Parliament.

== Political career ==
Amarjot Sandhu has been sitting as the Member of Provincial Parliament since winning his seat in the 2018 Ontario Provincial Election.

Sandhu is also a Member of the Standing Committee on Heritage, Infrastructure and Cultural Policy, and the Standing Committee on Procedure and House Affairs.

Amarjot Sandhu was appointed by Ontario's Premier Doug Ford in 2025 to serve as the parliamentary assistant to the Minister of Infrastructure.

=== 42nd Parliament ===
Sandhu served as a member of the Standing Committee on Regulations and Private Bills from July 26, 2018 - October 28, 2019. Amarjot also served as Chair of the Standing Committee on Finance and Economic Affairs from October 28, 2019 - October 20, 2021. He is currently serving as a member of both the Standing Committee on Public Accounts and Standing Committee on General Government. On July 9, 2021, Amarjot Sandhu began serving as the parliamentary assistant to the Minister of Infrastructure. In June 2019, after talking to constituents Amarjot tabled a motion to resume the environmental assessment of Highway 413. Highway 413 would be a 60 kilometre freeway connecting Milton from Highway 401 to Highway 400 in Vaughn. The previous Liberal government cancelled the proposal. During his time as the chair of the Standing Committee of Finance and Economic Affairs Amarjot met with many constituents and stake holders during the COVID-19 pandemic to better understand the economic and financial impacts that COVID-19 had on businesses and residents throughout the province. Amarjot chaired the Standing Committee of Finance and Economic Affairs to break the record for the number of hours spent in committee meetings. This committee spent hundreds of hours in session virtually.

=== 43rd Parliament ===
Sandhu won re-election to the 43rd Parliament of Ontario. He received 48% of the vote. Sandhu resumed his parliamentary duties following his election. He is currently serving as a member of the Standing Committee on Procedure and House Affairs, and Standing Committee on Government Agencies. He is also continuing his role as the parliamentary assistant to the Minister of Infrastructure.

== Election results ==
2025 Ontario general election: Brampton West
Party	Candidate	Votes	%	±%
Progressive Conservative	Amarjot Sandhu	19,028	56.58	+8.74
Liberal	Andrew Kania	10,933	32.51	+6.27
New Democratic	Samuel Sarjeant	1,981	5.89	–14.86
Green	Ethan Russell	877	2.61	–0.16
New Blue	David Pardy	554	1.65	–0.01
Independent	Pushpek Sidhu	260	0.77	–
Total valid votes		33,633	99.54	
Total rejected, unmarked and declined ballots		157	0.46	–0.01
Turnout		33,790	34.77	+0.58
Eligible voters		97,171		
Progressive Conservative hold		Swing		+7.50
Source: Elections Ontario

2022 Ontario general election: Brampton West
Party	Candidate	Votes	%	±%	Expenditures
Progressive Conservative	Amarjot Sandhu	14,751	47.84	+8.45	$98,809
Liberal	Rimmy Jhajj	8,089	26.23	+7.76	$113,178
New Democratic	Navjit Kaur	6,398	20.75	–17.35	$78,343
Green	Pauline Thornham	854	2.77	+0.14	$0
New Blue	David Pardy	511	1.66	–	$0
Ontario Party	Manjot Sekhon	233	0.76	–	$706
Total valid votes/expense limit		30,836	99.53	–	$126,364
Total rejected, unmarked and declined ballots		147	0.47	–0.23	
Turnout		30,983	34.19	–13.48	
Eligible voters		90,617			
Progressive Conservative hold		Swing		+0.35	
Source: Elections Ontario

2018 Ontario general election: Brampton West
Party	Candidate	Votes	%	±%
Progressive Conservative	Amarjot Sandhu	14,951	39.39	+15.05
New Democratic	Jagroop Singh	14,461	38.09	+14.44
Liberal	Vic Dhillon	7,013	18.47	–26.76
Green	Julie Guillemet-Ackerman	999	2.63	–0.11
Libertarian	David Shaw	364	0.96	–0.64
Communist	Surjit Sahota	173	0.46	–
Total valid votes		37,961	99.30	
Total rejected, unmarked and declined ballots		268	0.70	–1.00
Turnout		38,229	47.67	+5.17
Eligible voters		80,196		
Progressive Conservative gain from Liberal		Swing		+20.91
Source: Elections Ontario
