= 2018 Ontario general election =

Canadian provincial election

- June 7, 2018

124 seats of the Legislative Assembly of Ontario 63 seats needed for a majority
- Opinion polls
- Turnout: 56.67% (▲5.38pp)
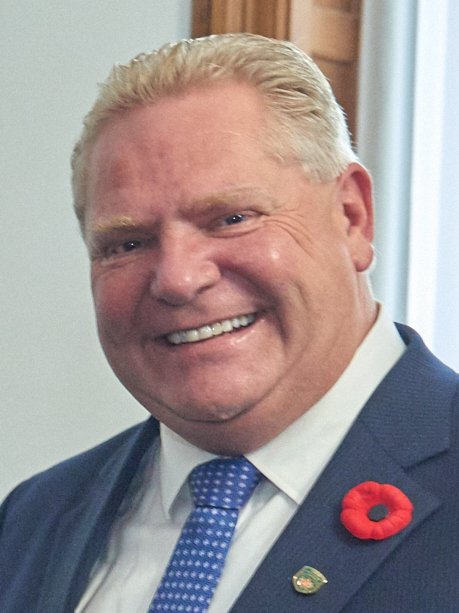

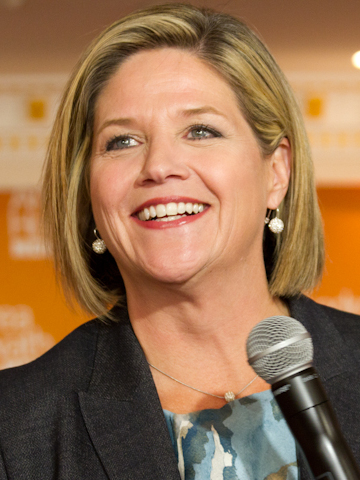

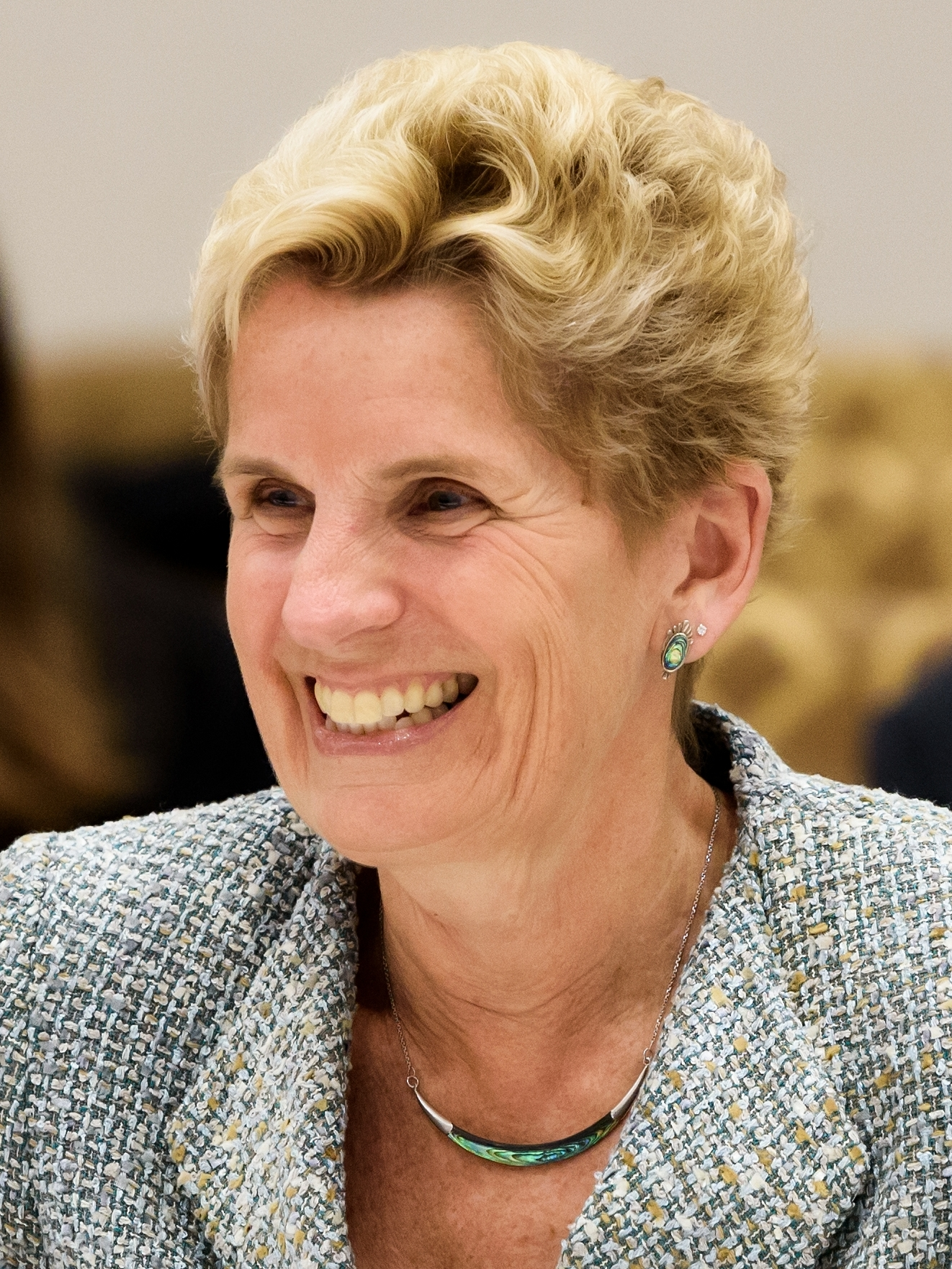

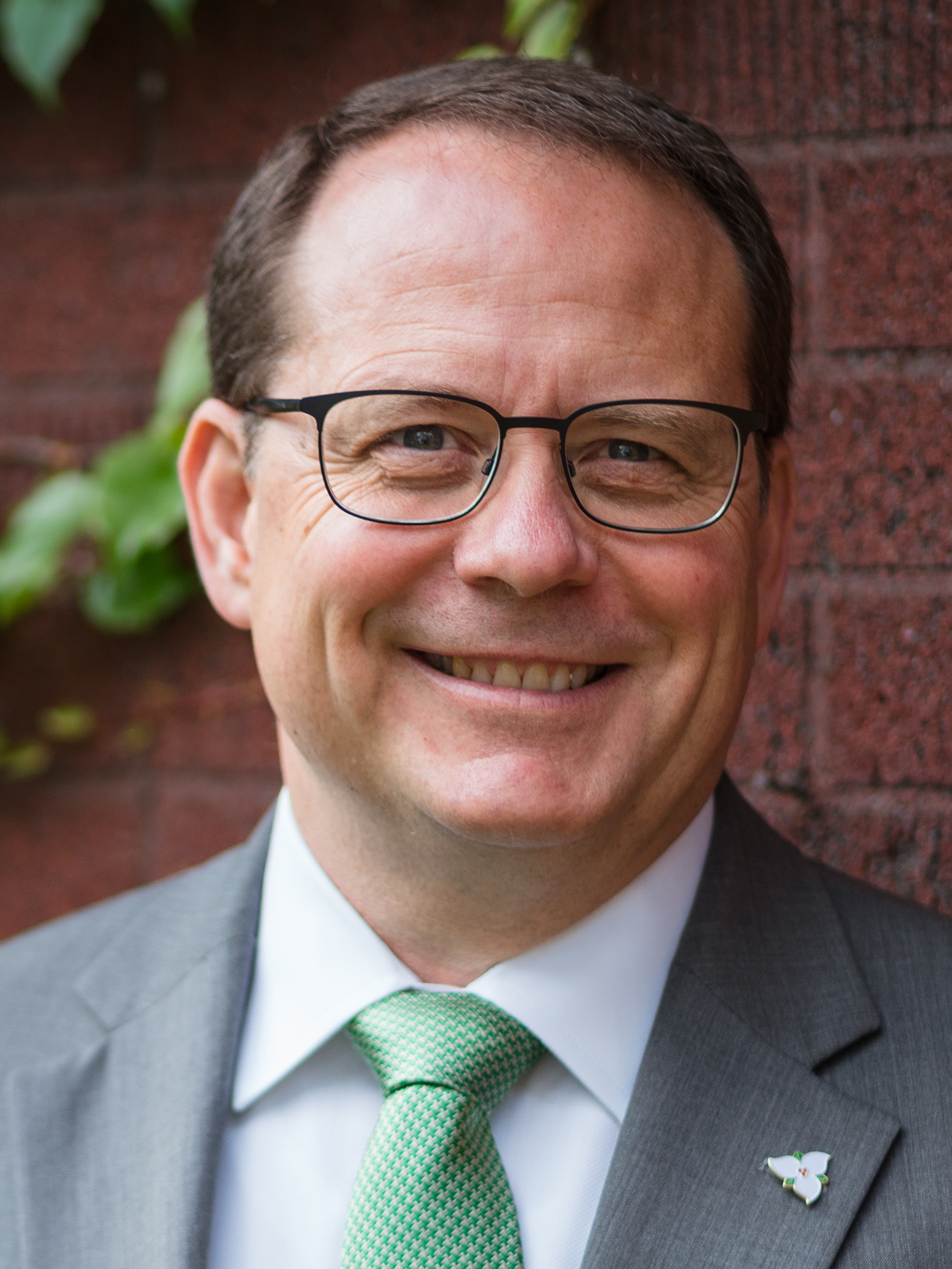
	First party	Second party
Leader	Doug Ford	Andrea Horwath
Party	Progressive Conservative	New Democratic
Leader since	March 10, 2018	March 7, 2009
Leader's seat	Ran in Etobicoke North (won)	Hamilton Centre
Last election	28 seats, 31.25%	21 seats, 23.75%
Seats before	27	18
Seats won	76	40
Seat change	▲49	▲22
Popular vote	2,326,632	1,929,649
Percentage	40.50%	33.59%
Swing	▲9.25pp	▲9.84pp
	Third party	Fourth party
Leader	Kathleen Wynne	Mike Schreiner
Party	Liberal	Green
Leader since	January 26, 2013	May 16, 2009
Leader's seat	Don Valley West	Guelph
Last election	58 seats, 38.65%	0 seats, 4.84%
Seats before	55	0
Seats won	7	1
Seat change	▼48	▲1
Popular vote	1,124,218	264,487
Percentage	19.57%	4.60%
Swing	▼19.08pp	▼0.24pp
- Popular vote by riding. As this is an FPTP election, seat totals are not determined by popular vote, but instead by the result in each riding. Riding names are listed at the bottom.
Premier before election
Kathleen Wynne
Liberal
Premier after election
Doug Ford
Progressive Conservative

General elections were held on June 7, 2018, to elect the 124 members of the 42nd Parliament of Ontario. The Progressive Conservative Party of Ontario, led by Doug Ford, won 76 of the 124 seats in the legislature and formed a majority government. The Ontario New Democratic Party, led by Andrea Horwath, formed the Official Opposition. The Ontario Liberal Party, led by incumbent Premier Kathleen Wynne, lost official party status in recording both the worst result in the party's 161-year history and the worst result for any incumbent governing party in Ontario. The Green Party of Ontario won a seat for the first time in their history, while the Trillium Party of Ontario lost its single seat gained by a floor-crossing during the 41st Parliament.

== Background ==
=== Redistribution of seats ===
The Electoral Boundaries Act, 2015 increased the number of electoral districts from 107 to 122, following the boundaries set out by the federal 2013 Representation Order for Ontario, while preserving the special boundaries of the 11 seats in Northern Ontario set out in the 1996 redistribution.

The Far North Electoral Boundaries Commission, appointed in 2016, recommended the creation of the additional districts of Kiiwetinoong and Mushkegowuk—James Bay, carved out from the existing Kenora—Rainy River and Timmins—James Bay ridings, which accordingly raised the total number of seats to 124. This was implemented through the Representation Statute Law Amendment Act, 2017.

The new districts have been criticized as undemocratic, as they have a population of around 30,000 people compared with over 120,000 people in some southern Ontario constituencies. National Post columnist Josh Dehaas suggested that the small population sizes of the ridings might violate the Canadian Charter of Rights and Freedoms.

In September 2017, a research firm analyzed the impact of redistribution if the boundaries had been in effect for the previous election.

=== Change of fixed election date ===
Under legislation passed in 2005, Ontario elections were to be held on "the first Thursday in October in the fourth calendar year following polling day in the most recent general election", subject to the Lieutenant-Governor of Ontario's power to call an election earlier. As the current government had a majority, the passage of a non-confidence motion was not a likely option for calling an early election, though Premier Kathleen Wynne stated in June 2015 that she would likely advise to dissolve the Legislature in spring 2018 rather than in October of that year in order to avoid any conflict with municipal elections and take advantage of better weather and longer days.

To put this on a statutory footing, in October 2016 Attorney General of Ontario Yasir Naqvi introduced a bill in the Legislative Assembly which, in part, included moving the election date to "the first Thursday in June in the fourth calendar year following polling day in the most recent general election", and it came into effect in December 2016.

=== Prelude to campaign ===
The Ontario Liberal Party attempted to win their fifth consecutive general election, dating back to 2003. The Progressive Conservative Party of Ontario won their first election since 1999, and the Ontario New Democratic Party attempted to win their second election (having previously won in 1990). Numerous other extra-parliamentary political parties also vied for votes.

The Liberals under Kathleen Wynne headed into the 2018 campaign trailing far behind the Progressive Conservatives, led by former Toronto City Councillor Doug Ford. The Liberals' standing with voters had been badly hurt when they partially privatized Hydro One in 2015, after campaigning against it in the 2014 election, as well as rising criticism over "ballooning provincial debt, high electricity prices and costly, politically expedient decisions". In early April, the CBC published their analysis of aggregate polls showing that Ford and the Progressive Conservatives were ahead of the other parties averaging 42.1% support, compared to 27.2% for the governing Liberals, 23.4% for the NDP and 5.7% for the Greens and with 11 Liberal MPPs announcing they would not be running for re-election or having already resigned their seats in the months leading up to the election.

According to Wynne, voters were offered a "stark choice", between "cutting and removing supports from people" with "billions in cuts", which she alleged the Progressive Conservatives would do if they won the election, and expanding investments in social programs such as prescription drugs and childcare, which the Liberal platform promised.

In March 2018, the Liberals tabled a pre-election budget in the provincial legislature which promised billions of dollars in new spending for free childcare and expanded coverage for dental care but replaced the government's previous balanced budget with a $6.7 billion deficit projected to last until 2024–2025. PC leader Doug Ford called the budget a "spending spree".

=== Mood of the voters ===
According to Toronto Star columnist Susan Delacourt, voters were motivated by a desire for change—such desire being more driven by emotion than by ideology—and one researcher estimated that more than half of the electorate was undecided in who they were likely to vote for. The Huffington Post reported that half of voters were basing their vote intentions on how best to block the party they oppose.

In February 2018, Campaign Research conducted a gap analysis on voter intentions in Ontario, and determined the following:

Voter gap analysis by party (February 2018)
Liberal	PC	NDP	Highlights
64%; 6%; 6%; 10%; 13%	51%; 7%; 6%; 10%; 26%	61%; 9%; 13%; 6%; 11%	PCs had the lowest proportion of respondents (51%) not willing to vote for them at all, while the Liberals had the highest such proportion (64%); At 13%, the Liberals' "hard support" was only half that for the PCs; For PCs, the strength of "hard support" increases with age, and older demographics tend to be more reliable voters; Conversely, such support for the Liberals and NDP significantly declines with age, with almost ¾ of those aged 55+ not willing to vote for them at all
= Not voting for party; not considered = Not voting for party; shared consideration = Not voting for party; exclusive consideration = Will vote for party; others considered = Will vote for party; no others considered

== Events leading up to the election (2014–2018) ==
Date	
June 12, 2014	The Liberal Party under Kathleen Wynne wins a majority government in the 41st Ontario general election. Progressive Conservative leader Tim Hudak announces his intention to step down following the selection of his successor.
July 2, 2014	Tim Hudak resigns as leader of the Progressive Conservatives. Simcoe—Grey MPP Jim Wilson is named interim leader.
July 24, 2014	The Liberals pass their May 1 budget in its final reading.
May 9, 2015	Patrick Brown, the Conservative federal MP for Barrie, is elected leader of the Progressive Conservative Party.
September 24, 2015	Ontario Provincial Police lay charges in relation to the Sudbury by-election scandal.
November 1, 2016	Ontario Provincial Police announce charges under the provincial act against Gerry Lougheed and Patricia Sorbara (CEO and director of the 2018 Liberal campaign) for alleged bribery during a 2015 byelection. Sorbara announced that she will step down from the campaign.
January 24, 2018	CTV News reports that Progressive Conservative Party leader Patrick Brown is accused by two women of committing sexual misconduct. Brown denies the allegations.
January 25, 2018	Patrick Brown resigns as leader of the Progressive Conservative Party.
January 26, 2018	Progressive Conservative Party caucus chooses Nipissing MPP Vic Fedeli as interim leader.
March 10, 2018	Doug Ford is elected leader of the Progressive Conservatives on the third ballot of the party's leadership election. Fedeli continues as Leader of the Opposition for legislative purposes until the election due to Ford not having a seat in the Legislature.
April 11, 2018	First Leaders Debate hosted by the Jamaican Canadian Association. Andrea Horwath, Mike Schreiner, and Premier Kathleen Wynne were in attendance.
April 16, 2018	The Ontario NDP release their full election platform.
May 7, 2018	First televised debate hosted by CityNews: Toronto-focused debate with Ford, Horwath and Wynne
May 9, 2018	Electoral Writ issued.
May 11, 2018	Leaders' debate in Parry Sound.
May 17, 2018	Candidate nominations close at 2 PM local time.
May 26, 2018	Advance voting starts at voting locations and returning offices.
May 27, 2018	Second televised debate, moderated by Steve Paikin and Farah Nasser, held at the Canadian Broadcasting Centre in Toronto and aired on CBC, CTV, Global, TVO, CPAC, CHCH and other outlets. Attended by Wynne, Ford, and Horwath.
May 30, 2018	Advance voting ends at advance voting locations.
June 1, 2018	Advance voting ends at returning offices.
June 2, 2018	Premier Wynne concedes that the Liberals will not win the election.
June 6, 2018	Special ballot voting at returning office or through home visit ends at 6:00 PM EST.
June 7, 2018	Election day. Fixed-date of the 2018 provincial election.

== Campaign period ==
=== Contests ===
Candidate contests in the ridings
Candidates nominated	Ridings	Party														
Candidates nominated	Ridings	PC	NDP	Lib	Green	Ltn	NOTA	Ind	Tr	Mod	Free	Comm	Cons	NO	Oth (Note: Minor political parties fielding fewer than ten candidates are aggregated together.)	Totals
4	2	2	2	2	2	0	0	0	0	0	0	0	0	0	0	8
5	19	19	19	19	19	15	1	2	0	0	0	0	0	1	0	95
6	43	43	43	43	43	43	5	5	8	6	2	3	1	6	7	258
7	33	33	33	33	33	32	21	7	11	5	6	2	4	2	9	231
8	15	15	15	15	15	15	9	8	3	1	3	6	5	1	9	120
9	10	10	10	10	10	10	5	9	3	4	3	1	0	0	15	90
10	1	1	1	1	1	1	0	0	0	0	0	0	0	0	5	10
11	1	1	1	1	1	1	1	1	0	0	0	0	0	0	4	11
Total	124	124	124	124	124	117	42	32	25	16	14	12	10	10	49	823

=== Issues ===
2018 Ontario election – issues and respective party platforms
Issue	Liberal	PC	NDP
Budget	Standing by its last budget's assertion of six consecutive deficits, with a return to balance in 2024–25	Conduct a value-for-money audit of the government's spending; Conduct an independent commission of inquiry into the previous government's spending; Centralize government purchasing; Increase the Risk Management Program limit by $50 million annually; Eliminate the Jobs and Prosperity fund	There will be five consecutive deficits of between $5 billion and $2 billion.
Child care	Publicly-funded child care for all Ontarians aged two-and-a-half to junior kindergarten age, regardless of income	Fund a sliding scale of tax rebates, providing up to $6,750 per child under 15 and giving low-income families as much as 75% of their child-care costs	Income-based scale for child care, providing publicly-funded child care for families earning under $40,000 annually and public funding to reduce the cost of childcare to an average of $12 per day cost for those making over $40,000
Education	Modernize the curriculum and assessment of schools, from kindergarten to grade 12; $3 billion in capital grants over 10 years to post-secondary institutions	Replace the present curricula for sex education; Return to traditional mathematics education; Ban cell phones in all primary and secondary school classrooms; Limit funding to postsecondary institutions that do not respect free speech; Make mathematics training mandatory in teachers’ college; Increase funding for children with autism by $38 million	$16 billion in spending over 10 years on infrastructure and repairs at Ontario's schools; Cap kindergarten class sizes at 26 students; Abolish standardized EQAO testing; Give OSAP-qualified students non-repayable grants instead of loans; Remove interest from existing student loans and apply interest that has already been paid to the loan principal
Environment	Proceed with April 2018 announcement to spend $1.7 billion over three years towards retrofitting homes for energy efficiency	Hire more conservation officers; Create an emissions-reduction fund to subsidize new technologies that reduce emissions; Increase funding for cleaning up garbage	Divert at least 25% of cap-and-trade revenue to help northern, rural and low-income Ontarians adapt to a lower-carbon lifestyle; Spend $50 million on a home-efficiency retrofit program
Healthcare	Create 30,000 new long-term care beds by 2028; Create a publicly-funded universal pharmacare program for seniors; Hire 400 new mental health workers in schools	Create 30,000 new long-term care beds by 2028; Increase funding for mental health; Increase funding for autism treatment by $125 million per year	Create a publicly-funded universal pharmacare program for everyone that covers approximately 125 medications; Create 40,000 new long-term care beds by 2028; Create 2,000 new hospital beds; Hire 4,500 new nurses
Electricity	Standing by its 2017 plan to defer rate increases through current borrowing; Will proceed to sell the Province's remaining 60% interest in Hydro One	Cut rates by 12%, over and above the Liberals' current 25% reduction; Fire the CEO and Board of Hydro One; Cancel energy contracts that are in the pre-construction stage	Return Hydro One to 100% public ownership; Reduce rates by 30%; End time-of-use pricing
Regulation	Increase the minimum wage to $15 per hour in 2019; End geographic price variations in car insurance rates	Keep the minimum wage at $14 per hour; Allow the sale of beer and wine in corner stores, grocery stores, and box stores; Reduce the minimum price of beer from $1.25 to $1	Increase the minimum wage to $15 per hour in 2019; Allow illegal immigrants to access all government services and do not enforce federal immigration laws against them; Impose price controls on gasoline
Taxation	Proceed with last budget's simplification of rate structure for personal income tax; Raise taxes on cigarettes by $4 per carton; Increase taxes on people making over $95,000 per year	Reduce middle-class income tax rates by 20%; Eliminate income tax entirely for minimum-wage earners; Repeal the present cap and trade program; Challenge the federal carbon tax in court; Reduce the small business income tax rate by 8.7%; Reduce gasoline taxes by 10¢ per litre; Reduce diesel taxes by 10.3¢ per litre; Reduce the corporate income tax rate from 11.5% to 10.5%; Reduce aviation fuel taxes for Northern Ontario flights; Exempt the Royal Canadian Legion from being charged property tax	Raise corporate tax rate from 11.5% to 13%; Raise income taxes on people earning over $220,000 by 1%; Raise income taxes on people earning over $300,000 by 2%
Transportation	Fund $79 billion for various public-transit projects over 14 years; Build a Toronto-to-Windsor high-speed rail line; Fund an expansion of light rail O-Train in Ottawa	$5 billion in extra funding for new subways in Toronto; Upload ownership and construction of subway lines from the municipal government to the provincial government; Build the Relief Line subway line; Build the Yonge Extension subway line; Build future crosstown expansions underground; Expand all-day two-way GO service Bowmanville and Kitchener; Finish construction of the Niagara GO Expansion; Restore operations of the Northlander in Northern Ontario; Fund an expansion of light rail O-Train in Ottawa; Ensure that the Scarborough subway extension to the Scarborough Town Centre will have three stops; Build the Sheppard Loop with the Scarborough subway extension	Cover 50% of the operating costs of municipal transit services; Build the Relief Line in Toronto; Restore operations of the Northlander in Northern Ontario; Bring in two-way all-day service on GO Transit's Kitchener line; Construct the LRT line in Hamilton; Electrify the existing GO lines and the Union Pearson Express; Remove tolls on the Highway 412 and prevent tolls for the Highway 418

=== Party slogans ===
Party	English	French	Translation of French (unofficial)
█ Liberal	"Care over cuts"		
█ PC	"For the People"		
█ New Democratic	"Change for the better"	"Changeons pour le mieux"	Let's change for the better
█ Green	"People Powered Change"		
█ Libertarian	"The Party of Choice"		

=== Endorsements ===
Endorsements received by each party
Type	Liberal	PC	NDP	Green	No endorsement
Media		Postmedia Network; The London Free Press; Toronto Sun; National Post; Ottawa Citizen; Ajax News Advertiser	Toronto Star; Metroland Media Group; The Hamilton Spectator; Niagara Falls Review; Le Droit	Toronto Star (Riding of Guelph only)	The Globe and Mail; Waterloo Region Record; Laurentian Media Group
Politicians and public figures	Justin Trudeau; Hazel McCallion (Riding of Mississauga—Lakeshore only)	Andrew Scheer; Hazel McCallion; Kevin O'Leary; Mel Lastman; Stephen Harper	Jagmeet Singh; Michael Coren; Jerry Dias; Bernie Farber; Kay Gardner; David Miller; Judy Rebick; Kristyn Wong-Tam; Charles Pascal; Sandy Hudson; Olivia Chow	Elizabeth May; David Suzuki	
Unions and business associations		Ontario Convenience Stores Association; Ottawa Police Association; United Steelworkers Local 2251	Elementary Teachers' Federation of Ontario; Canadian Union of Public Employees; Ontario Steelworkers; Amalgamated Transit Union		

== Candidates ==
=== Candidate nominations ===
In February 2018, the PC leadership overturned the nomination of candidates Karma Macgregor in Ottawa West—Nepean and Thenusha Parani in Scarborough Centre because of irregularities and allegations of ballot stuffing at their nomination meetings. Both candidates denied these claims. The nomination meetings were reorganized, and both candidates lost the nomination at those meetings. However, the PC leadership decided not to overturn the nomination meeting's result in Hamilton West—Ancaster—Dundas, where a similar situation took place, because of an ongoing police investigation on this situation.

In March 2018, the NDP nominated Lyra Evans as their candidate in Ottawa—Vanier. Evans was the first openly transgender candidate nominated by a major party to run in an Ontario general election.

=== Incumbents not running for reelection ===
Electoral District	Incumbent at dissolution and subsequent nominee		New MPP
Brant (now Brantford—Brant)	Dave Levac	Ruby Toor	Will Bouma
Glengarry—Prescott—Russell	Grant Crack	Pierre Leroux	Amanda Simard
Guelph	Liz Sandals	Sly Castaldi	Mike Schreiner
Kenora—Rainy River	Sarah Campbell	Glen Archer	Greg Rickford
Kitchener—Conestoga	Michael Harris	–	Mike Harris Jr.
London North Centre	Deb Matthews	Kate Graham	Terence Kernaghan
Markham—Unionville	Michael Chan	Amanda Yeung Collucci	Billy Pang
Parkdale—High Park	Cheri DiNovo	Bhutila Karpoche	Bhutila Karpoche
Mississauga—Erindale	Harinder Takhar	Riding dissolved	
Pickering—Scarborough East	Tracy MacCharles	Riding dissolved	
Scarborough Centre	Brad Duguid	Mazhar Shafiq	Christina Mitas
Simcoe North	Patrick Brown	–	Jill Dunlop
Welland (now Niagara Centre)	Cindy Forster	Jeff Burch	Jeff Burch
York Centre	Monte Kwinter	Ramon Estaris	Roman Baber
York—Simcoe	Julia Munro	Caroline Mulroney	Caroline Mulroney
York West (now Humber River—Black Creek)	Mario Sergio	Deanna Sgro	Tom Rakocevic

== Results ==
↓
76	40	7	1
Progressive Conservative	New Democratic	Liberal	G

Elections Ontario used electronic vote tabulator machines from Dominion Voting Systems for counting the ballots. Tabulators were deployed at 50 per cent of polling stations at a cost of CA$32,000,000. This election was the first time Ontario used vote counting machines for a provincial election, although tabulators have been used in Ontario civic elections for more than 20 years, and also in a 2016 by-election in Whitby-Oshawa. The original paper ballots marked by voters will be kept for a year along with the digital scans of each ballot by the tabulator.

The percentage of votes cast for the Progressive Conservatives by riding.

The percentage of votes cast for the NDP by riding.

The percentage of votes cast for the Liberals by riding.

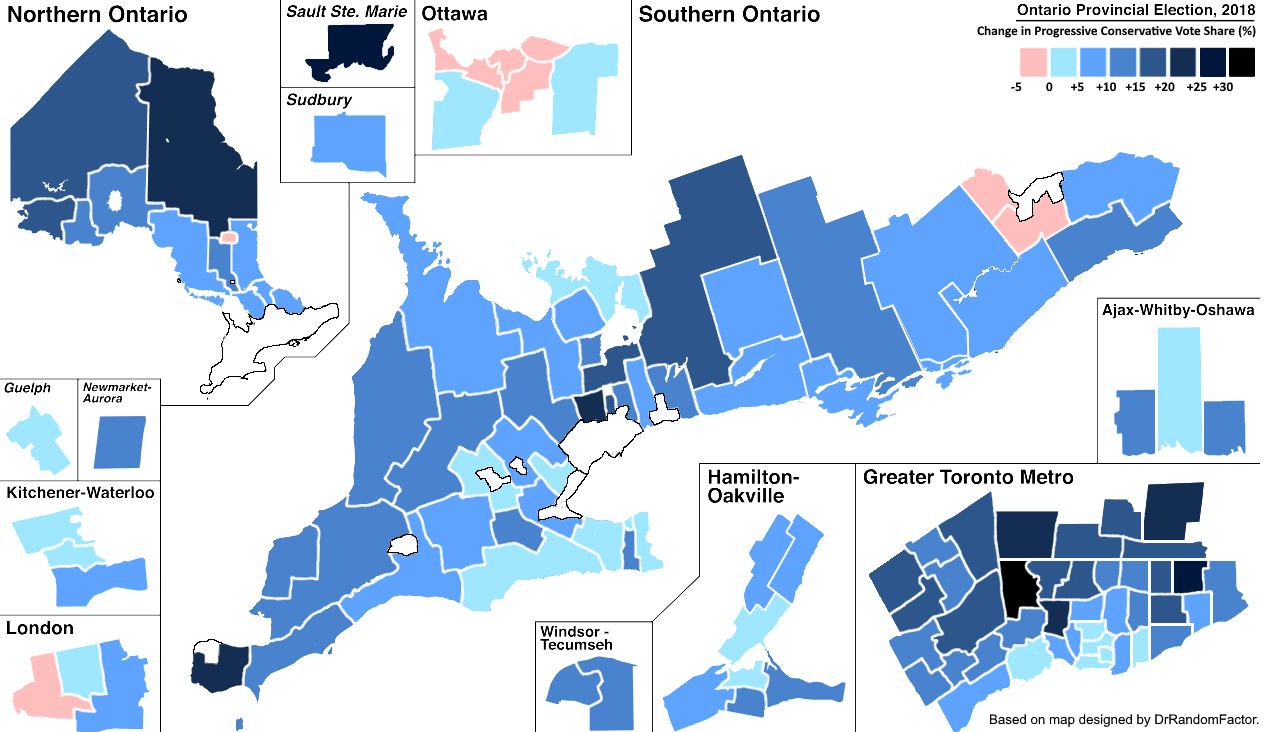
Change in Progressive Conservative vote share by riding compared to the 2014 Ontario election.

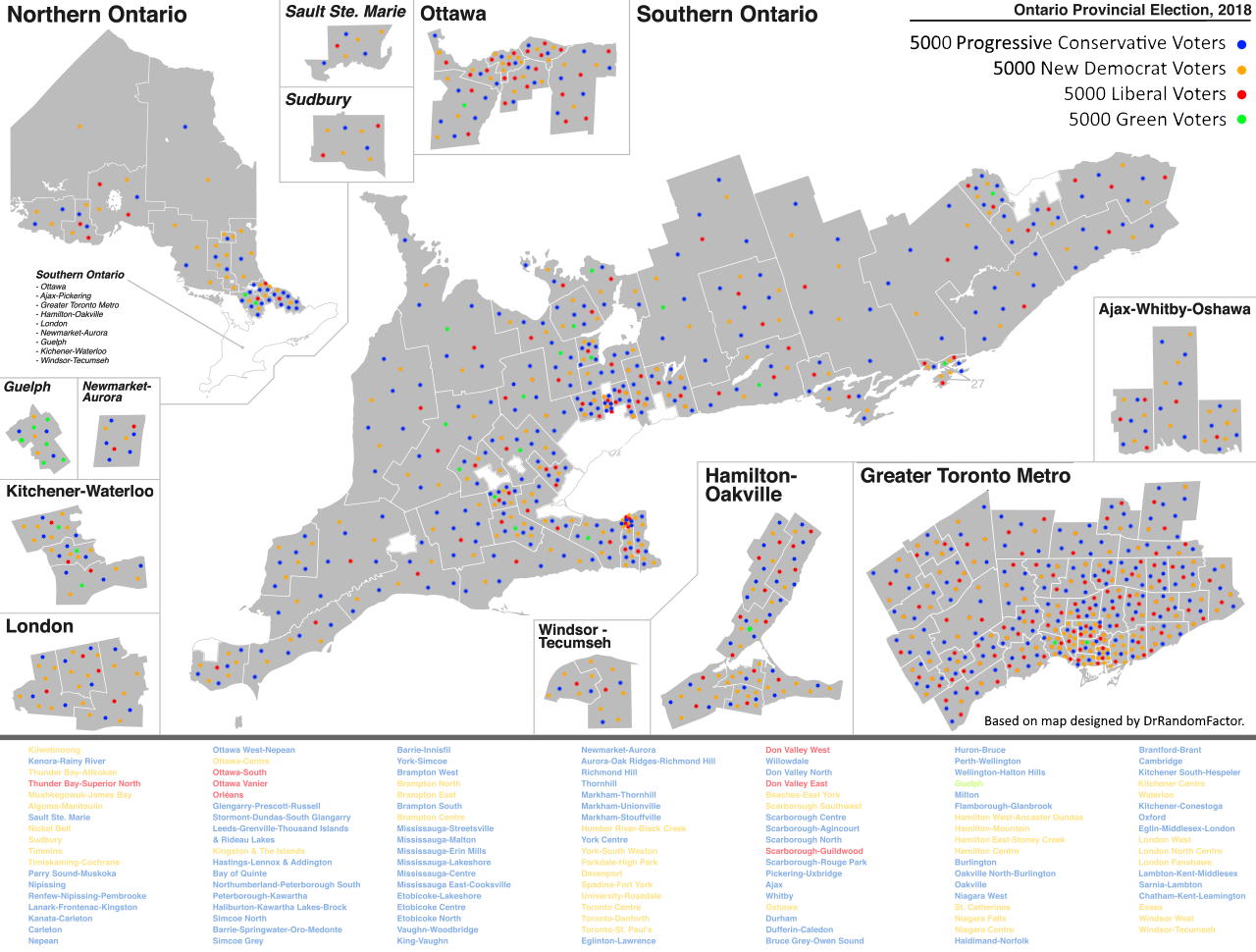
Each dot represents five-thousand votes for the party of the associated colour. Data is based on individual riding results. Dots are placed at random positions within the ridings that they belong to.

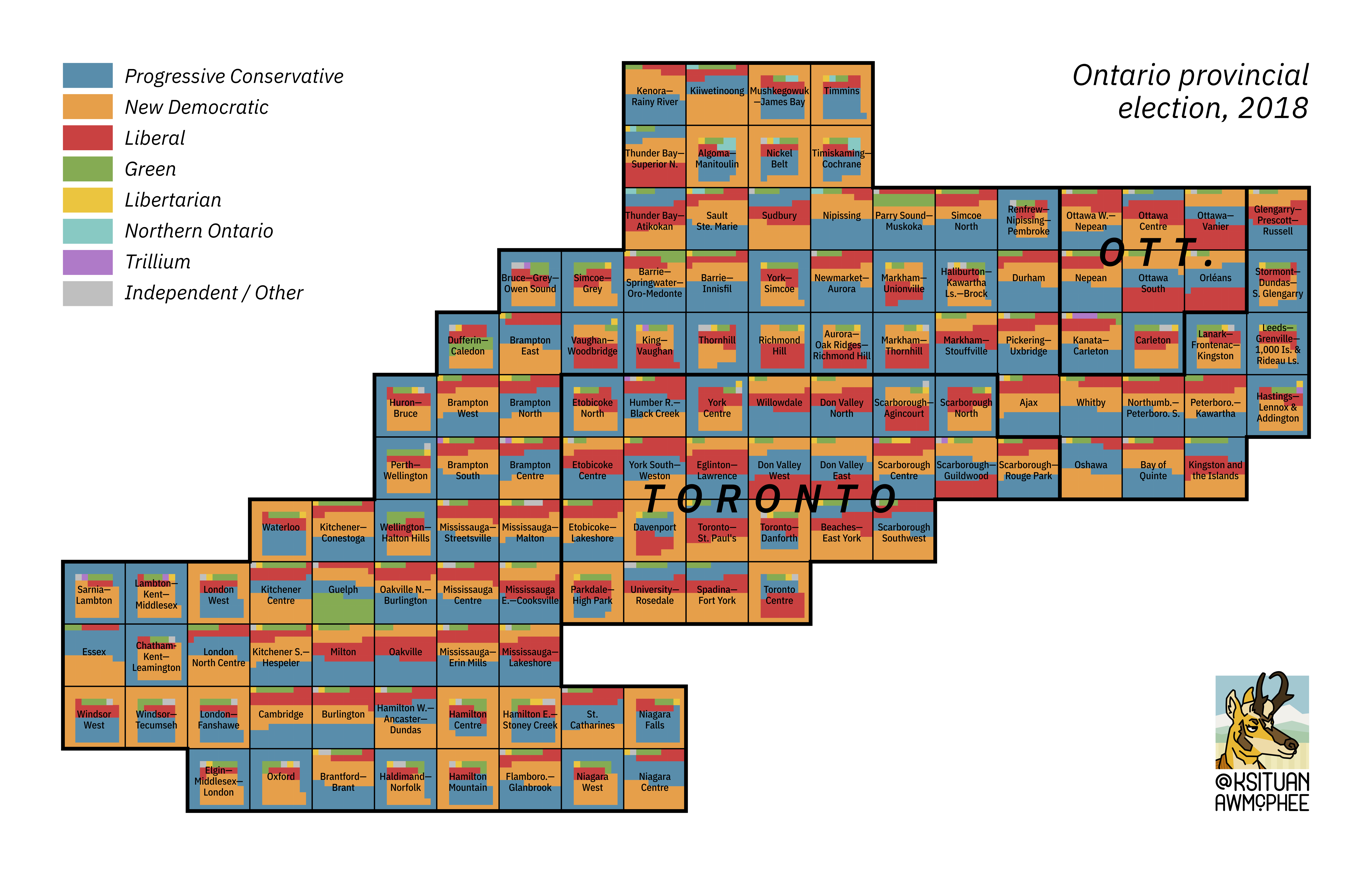
A cartogram showing popular vote in each riding.

The disproportionality of elections to the Legislative Assembly in the 2018 election was 17.96 according to the Gallagher Index, significantly in favour of the PCs.

=== Vote and seat summaries ===
Ternary plots - shift of electoral support (2014-2018)
2014

2018
Electoral districts identified by colours of winning parties

Party	Votes			Seats
Progressive Conservative	2,326,632	40.50%	▲9.25pp	76 / 124 (61%)
New Democratic	1,929,649	33.59%	▲9.84pp	40 / 124 (32%)
Liberal	1,124,218	19.57%	▼19.08pp	7 / 124 (6%)
Green	264,487	4.60%	▼0.24pp	1 / 124 (0.8%)

Popular vote
PC	40.50%
New Democratic	33.59%
Liberal	19.57%
Green	4.60%
Others	1.74%

Seat summary
PC	61.29%
New Democratic	32.26%
Liberal	5.65%
Green	0.81%

=== Synopsis of results ===
Results by riding - 2018 Ontario general election
Riding	Winning party							Turnout (Note: including spoilt ballots)	Votes (Note: minor political parties receiving less than 1% of the popular vote are aggregated under "Other"; independent candidates are aggregated separately)						
Riding	2014	1st place	Votes	Share	Margin #	Margin %	2nd place	Turnout	PC	NDP	Lib	Green	Ind	Other	Total
Ajax	Lib	PC	19,078	39.1%	3,948	8.1%	NDP	54.6%	19,078	15,130	12,607	1,224	220	601	48,860
Algoma—Manitoulin	NDP	NDP	17,105	58.6%	9,962	34.1%	PC	53.1%	7,143	17,105	2,365	1,025	–	1,573	29,211
Aurora—Oak Ridges—Richmond Hill	New	PC	25,214	56.0%	15,496	34.4%	Lib	55.4%	25,214	8,116	9,718	1,195	–	755	44,998
Barrie—Innisfil	Lib	PC	22,121	50.0%	9,460	21.4%	NDP	54.3%	22,121	12,661	5,543	3,190	–	757	44,272
Barrie—Springwater—Oro-Medonte	New	PC	20,445	44.7%	7,554	16.5%	NDP	57.0%	20,445	12,891	6,210	5,354	335	454	45,689
Bay of Quinte	Lib	PC	24,224	48.0%	8,161	16.2%	NDP	56.5%	24,224	16,063	7,511	1,730	379	535	50,442
Beaches—East York	Lib	NDP	24,064	48.2%	10,584	21.2%	Lib	61.2%	9,202	24,064	13,480	2,128	161	879	49,914
Brampton Centre	New	NDP	12,892	38.4%	89	0.3%	PC	50.3%	12,803	12,892	5,825	1,053	–	1,025	33,598
Brampton East	NDP	NDP	18,062	46.9%	5,166	13.4%	PC	51.2%	12,896	18,062	6,398	523	–	616	38,495
Brampton North	Lib	NDP	14,877	37.5%	497	1.3%	PC	51.7%	14,380	14,877	8,410	1,366	–	591	39,624
Brampton South	New	PC	15,652	41.0%	2,733	7.2%	NDP	51.6%	15,652	12,919	7,212	1,472	–	914	38,169
Brampton West	Lib	PC	14,951	39.4%	490	1.3%	NDP	49.9%	14,951	14,461	7,013	999	–	537	37,961
Brantford—Brant	Lib	PC	24,437	39.4%	635	1.1%	NDP	47.7%	24,437	23,802	5,553	2,741	–	1,655	58,188
Bruce—Grey—Owen Sound	PC	PC	26,874	54.7%	15,037	30.6%	NDP	57.2%	26,874	11,837	6,041	2,927	–	1,449	49,129
Burlington	Lib	PC	25,504	40.4%	7,451	11.8%	NDP	58.4%	25,504	18,053	15,515	2,828	–	1,155	63,055
Cambridge	Lib	PC	17,793	37.0%	2,154	4.5%	NDP	63.4%	17,793	15,639	11,191	3,018	–	490	48,131
Carleton	New	PC	25,798	51.3%	14,490	28.8%	NDP	55.2%	25,798	11,308	9,768	1,985	91	1,308	50,258
Chatham-Kent—Leamington	PC	PC	24,078	51.9%	7,520	16.2%	NDP	62.0%	24,078	16,558	3,736	1,643	358	–	46,373
Davenport	Lib	NDP	27,613	60.3%	19,055	41.6%	Lib	56.8%	7,370	27,613	8,558	1,624	69	585	45,819
Don Valley East	Lib	Lib	13,012	35.9%	1,028	2.8%	PC	55.2%	11,984	9,937	13,012	917	–	367	36,217
Don Valley North	New	PC	18,046	44.4%	5,489	13.5%	Lib	53.8%	18,046	8,476	12,557	1,039	–	489	40,607
Don Valley West	Lib	Lib	17,802	38.9%	181	0.4%	PC	61.3%	17,621	8,620	17,802	1,268	–	466	45,777
Dufferin—Caledon	PC	PC	29,704	53.1%	18,323	32.7%	NDP	56.6%	29,704	11,381	6,972	7,011	–	888	55,956
Durham	Lib	PC	28,575	47.0%	9,322	15.3%	NDP	59.9%	28,575	19,253	10,237	2,360	–	382	60,807
Eglinton—Lawrence	Lib	PC	19,999	40.4%	957	1.9%	Lib	60.1%	19,999	8,985	19,042	1,190	–	311	49,527
Elgin—Middlesex—London	PC	PC	29,264	55.5%	12,341	23.4%	NDP	59.4%	29,264	16,923	3,857	2,029	–	694	52,767
Essex	NDP	NDP	26,134	47.9%	2,711	5.0%	PC	56.1%	23,423	26,134	3,026	1,920	–	–	54,503
Etobicoke Centre	Lib	PC	24,432	43.0%	4,724	8.3%	Lib	61.9%	24,432	10,311	19,708	1,329	162	883	56,825
Etobicoke—Lakeshore	Lib	PC	22,626	38.3%	3,225	5.5%	NDP	58.6%	22,626	19,401	14,305	2,138	–	523	58,993
Etobicoke North	Lib	PC	19,055	52.5%	9,845	27.1%	NDP	50.6%	19,055	9,210	6,601	1,026	–	414	36,306
Flamborough—Glanbrook	New	PC	22,454	43.5%	4,824	9.4%	NDP	60.6%	22,454	17,630	7,967	2,307	–	1,230	51,588
Glengarry—Prescott—Russell	Lib	PC	19,952	41.0%	4,543	9.3%	Lib	55.4%	19,952	10,610	15,409	1,427	–	1,292	48,690
Guelph	Lib	Grn	29,082	45.0%	14,998	23.4%	PC	61.1%	14,084	13,929	6,537	29,082	–	945	64,577
Haldimand—Norfolk	PC	PC	28,889	57.1%	15,280	30.2%	NDP	59.2%	28,889	13,609	4,656	2,095	–	1,344	50,593
Haliburton—Kawartha Lakes—Brock	PC	PC	32,406	56.7%	17,264	30.2%	NDP	59.7%	32,406	15,142	5,655	2,551	–	1,389	57,143
Hamilton Centre	NDP	NDP	23,866	65.2%	18,136	49.6%	PC	48.9%	5,730	23,866	3,982	2,102	156	739	36,575
Hamilton East—Stoney Creek	NDP	NDP	22,518	51.1%	9,834	22.3%	PC	53.1%	12,684	22,518	5,320	1,884	–	1,614	44,020
Hamilton Mountain	NDP	NDP	24,406	54.6%	11,515	25.8%	PC	56.2%	12,891	24,406	4,134	2,300	–	986	44,717
Hamilton West—Ancaster—Dundas	Lib	NDP	23,921	43.2%	6,732	12.2%	PC	62.3%	17,189	23,921	10,960	2,302	247	771	55,390
Hastings—Lennox and Addington	New	PC	22,374	50.2%	7,933	17.8%	NDP	59.1%	22,374	14,441	5,180	1,924	–	602	44,521
Humber River—Black Creek	Lib	NDP	11,573	37.4%	2,206	7.1%	PC	47.3%	9,367	11,573	8,642	485	–	862	30,929
Huron—Bruce	PC	PC	27,646	52.4%	12,320	23.3%	NDP	63.5%	27,646	15,326	7,356	1,804	–	670	52,802
Kanata—Carleton	PC	PC	23,089	43.2%	7,497	14.0%	NDP	62.3%	23,089	15,592	9,090	2,827	–	2,855	53,453
Kenora—Rainy River	NDP	PC	9,748	48.6%	2,255	11.2%	NDP	54.1%	9,748	7,493	2,123	707	–	–	20,071
King—Vaughan	New	PC	29,136	56.6%	17,124	33.3%	Lib	55.5%	29,136	7,921	12,012	1,754	–	638	51,461
Kingston and the Islands	Lib	NDP	21,788	39.2%	6,476	11.6%	Lib	57.3%	14,512	21,788	15,312	3,574	–	458	55,644
Kitchener Centre	Lib	NDP	20,512	43.4%	7,432	15.7%	PC	58.3%	13,080	20,512	9,499	3,234	–	955	47,280
Kitchener—Conestoga	PC	PC	17,005	39.6%	686	1.6%	NDP	59.9%	17,005	16,319	6,035	2,853	–	762	42,974
Kitchener South—Hespeler	New	PC	16,511	38.9%	770	1.8%	NDP	55.8%	16,511	15,741	6,335	3,198	275	423	42,483
Lambton—Kent—Middlesex	PC	PC	27,906	58.3%	11,108	22.0%	NDP	60.8%	27,906	16,800	3,143	1,660	–	915	50,424
Lanark—Frontenac—Kingston	PC	PC	26,194	52.0%	10,855	21.6%	NDP	62.0%	26,194	15,339	5,359	2,410	440	601	50,343
Leeds—Grenville—Thousand Islands and Rideau Lakes	PC	PC	30,002	61.3%	20,314	41.5%	NDP	60.2%	30,002	9,688	6,543	2,347	–	389	48,969
London—Fanshawe	NDP	NDP	25,272	55.7%	11,753	25.9%	PC	49.6%	13,519	25,272	3,797	2,050	–	753	45,391
London North Centre	Lib	NDP	25,757	47.6%	9,056	16.7%	PC	54.9%	16,701	25,757	8,501	2,493	–	661	54,113
London West	NDP	NDP	32,644	55.3%	15,511	26.3%	PC	60.6%	17,133	32,644	5,847	2,211	–	1,161	58,996
Markham—Stouffville	Lib	PC	25,912	48.1%	11,905	22.1%	Lib	58.6%	25,912	10,997	14,007	2,153	–	777	53,846
Markham—Thornhill	New	PC	18,943	50.4%	9,783	26.0%	Lib	52.2%	18,943	8,010	9,160	859	–	576	37,548
Markham—Unionville	Lib	PC	29,305	62.4%	20,849	44.4%	Lib	54.7%	29,305	7,778	8,456	996	–	405	46,940
Milton	New	PC	18,249	41.7%	5,185	11.8%	Lib	56.1%	18,249	9,740	13,064	2,200	–	536	43,789
Mississauga Centre	New	PC	17,860	40.9%	5,814	13.3%	NDP	49.8%	17,860	12,046	11,102	1,149	–	1,553	43,710
Mississauga East—Cooksville	Lib	PC	17,862	41.1%	4,739	10.9%	Lib	51.5%	17,862	9,871	13,123	1,498	–	1,051	43,405
Mississauga—Erin Mills	Lib	PC	19,631	41.6%	6,610	14.0%	NDP	55.1%	19,631	13,021	11,965	1,296	–	1,265	47,178
Mississauga—Lakeshore	Lib	PC	22,520	42.3%	3,884	14.0%	Lib	59.3%	22,520	9,735	18,636	1,572	–	736	53,199
Mississauga—Malton	Lib	PC	14,712	39.1%	2,361	6.3%	NDP	48.4%	14,712	12,351	7,813	674	1,187	874	37,611
Mississauga—Streetsville	Lib	PC	20,879	43.5%	8,486	17.7%	NDP	55.5%	20,879	12,393	12,344	1,349	–	999	47,964
Nepean	PC	PC	23,899	45.1%	8,789	16.6%	NDP	58.7%	23,899	15,110	10,383	2,739	–	826	52,957
Newmarket—Aurora	Lib	PC	24,813	47.7%	12,408	23.9%	NDP	59.0%	24,813	12,405	11,840	1,859	447	649	52,013
Niagara Centre	NDP	NDP	21,618	44.2%	3,285	6.7%	PC	56.1%	18,333	21,618	5,779	1,803	217	1,124	48,874
Niagara Falls	NDP	NDP	30,161	50.8%	9,035	15.2%	PC	54.6%	21,126	30,161	5,554	2,057	–	483	59,381
Niagara West	PC	PC	24,394	52.8%	10,625	23.0%	NDP	63.3%	24,394	13,769	4,859	2,590	–	578	46,190
Nickel Belt	NDP	NDP	23,157	63.5%	15,139	41.5%	PC	55.4%	8,018	23,157	3,182	1,137	–	973	36,467
Nipissing	PC	PC	17,598	49.9%	4,604	13.1%	NDP	58.2%	17,598	12,994	2,794	997	–	860	35,243
Northumberland—Peterborough South	Lib	PC	27,386	45.3%	12,582	20.8%	NDP	64.6%	27,386	14,804	14,603	2,740	–	890	60,423
Oakville	Lib	PC	24,837	43.7%	4,510	7.9%	Lib	62.5%	24,837	9,424	20,327	1,986	–	297	56,871
Oakville North—Burlington	Lib	PC	25,691	46.4%	12,195	22.0%	NDP	60.2%	25,691	13,496	13,487	2,052	–	625	55,351
Orléans	Lib	Lib	24,972	39.0%	2,463	3.8%	PC	62.8%	22,509	14,033	24,972	1,603	435	398	63,950
Oshawa	NDP	NDP	24,301	44.9%	1,707	3.2%	PC	54.6%	22,594	24,301	4,278	1,957	–	1,013	54,143
Ottawa Centre	Lib	NDP	29,675	46.1%	8,564	13.3%	Lib	61.2%	10,327	29,675	21,111	2,266	–	1,024	64,403
Ottawa South	Lib	Lib	20,773	39.6%	5,454	10.4%	PC	56.9%	15,319	14,250	20,773	1,618	–	456	52,416
Ottawa—Vanier	Lib	Lib	20,555	42.9%	6,323	13.2%	NDP	51.5%	10,252	14,232	20,555	1,955	–	964	47,958
Ottawa West—Nepean	Lib	PC	16,590	32.8%	175	0.3%	NDP	57.0%	16,590	16,415	14,810	1,937	–	793	50,545
Oxford	PC	PC	29,152	55.7%	13,235	25.3%	NDP	59.2%	29,152	15,917	3,620	2,254	335	1,033	52,311
Parkdale—High Park	NDP	NDP	32,407	59.4%	22,586	41.4%	PC	62.4%	9,821	32,407	9,271	2,544	–	506	54,549
Parry Sound—Muskoka	PC	PC	22,662	48.1%	12,277	26.0%	NDP	59.2%	22,662	10,385	4,071	9,438	219	368	47,143
Perth—Wellington	PC	PC	23,736	50.7%	9,351	20.0%	NDP	60.3%	23,736	14,385	5,062	2,746	–	914	46,843
Peterborough—Kawartha	PC	PC	22,904	37.7%	2,386	3.9%	NDP	62.7%	22,904	20,518	14,946	2,024	–	398	60,790
Pickering—Uxbridge	Lib	PC	22,447	42.2%	5,414	10.2%	NDP	58.9%	22,447	17,033	10,851	2,105	373	384	53,193
Renfrew—Nipissing—Pembroke	PC	PC	33,350	69.2%	25,284	52.5%	NDP	59.7%	33,350	8,066	4,701	1,436	–	646	48,199
Richmond Hill	Lib	PC	22,224	51.2%	10,116	23.3%	Lib	52.2%	22,224	7,490	12,108	1,248	–	301	43,371
St. Catharines	Lib	NDP	18,911	36.6%	1,558	3.0%	PC	58.1%	17,353	18,911	12,671	1,923	–	792	51,650
Sarnia—Lambton	PC	PC	26,811	52.7%	7,816	15.4%	NDP	60.9%	26,811	18,995	2,246	1,856	71	851	50,830
Sault Ste. Marie	Lib	PC	13,498	42.0%	414	1.3%	NDP	54.5%	13,498	13,084	3,199	1,044	–	1,292	32,117
Scarborough—Agincourt	Lib	PC	18,582	50.4%	8,153	22.1%	Lib	51.3%	18,582	6,434	10,429	635	189	602	36,871
Scarborough Centre	Lib	PC	15,266	38.4%	2,019	5.1%	NDP	53.2%	15,266	13,247	8,791	919	–	1,481	39,704
Scarborough—Guildwood	Lib	Lib	11,972	33.3%	74	0.2%	PC	52.9%	11,898	9,917	11,972	878	66	1,174	35,905
Scarborough North	Lib	PC	17,413	51.0%	9,093	26.7%	NDP	50.8%	17,413	8,320	7,519	543	–	318	34,113
Scarborough—Rouge Park	New	PC	16,224	38.6%	963	2.3%	NDP	55.5%	16,224	15,261	8,785	1,014	–	731	42,015
Scarborough Southwest	Lib	NDP	19,835	45.7%	6,270	14.4%	PC	56.0%	13,565	19,835	8,228	1,174	–	641	43,443
Simcoe—Grey	PC	PC	34,094	55.9%	20,650	33.9%	NDP	57.1%	34,094	13,444	8,780	4,192	–	453	60,963
Simcoe North	PC	PC	25,236	46.9%	10,158	18.9%	NDP	58.9%	25,236	15,078	9,523	3,632	–	320	53,789
Spadina—Fort York	Lib	NDP	24,677	49.6%	12,907	26.0%	Lib	53.4%	10,834	24,677	11,770	1,815	–	635	49,731
Stormont—Dundas—South Glengarry	PC	PC	26,780	61.5%	17,364	39.9%	NDP	54.1%	26,780	9,416	5,386	1,596	–	360	43,538
Sudbury	NDP	NDP	17,386	48.1%	8,981	24.8%	PC	54.2%	8,405	17,386	8,108	1,504	82	682	36,167
Thornhill	PC	PC	28,889	61.1%	19,755	41.8%	NDP	56.2%	28,889	9,134	6,985	1,043	–	1,208	47,259
Thunder Bay—Atikokan	Lib	NDP	11,793	36.3%	81	0.3%	Lib	54.7%	7,555	11,793	11,712	880	–	585	32,525
Thunder Bay—Superior North	Lib	Lib	11,973	39.9%	813	2.7%	NDP	53.8%	5,395	11,160	11,973	838	–	669	30,035
Timiskaming—Cochrane	NDP	NDP	16,806	61.2%	10,646	38.8%	PC	53.1%	6,160	16,806	2,476	723	–	1,296	27,461
Timmins	NDP	NDP	8,978	57.4%	4,344	27.8%	PC	48.1%	4,634	8,978	1,378	273	–	370	15,633
Toronto Centre	Lib	NDP	23,688	53.7%	11,702	26.5%	Lib	54.3%	6,234	23,688	11,986	1,377	–	863	44,148
Toronto—Danforth	NDP	NDP	32,938	64.2%	24,807	48.4%	PC	61.6%	8,131	32,938	7,216	2,248	228	508	51,269
Toronto—St. Paul's	Lib	NDP	18,843	36.0%	1,345	2.6%	Lib	60.7%	13,780	18,843	17,498	1,690	–	591	52,402
University—Rosedale	New	NDP	24,537	49.7%	13,639	27.6%	Lib	56.6%	10,431	24,537	10,898	2,652	220	674	49,412
Vaughan—Woodbridge	Lib	PC	21,687	50.5%	7,945	18.5%	Lib	56.0%	21,687	6,254	13,742	972	–	291	42,946
Waterloo	NDP	NDP	27,315	50.5%	10,342	19.1%	PC	61.8%	16,973	27,315	6,577	2,613	–	566	54,044
Wellington—Halton Hills	PC	PC	31,659	54.0%	17,572	30.0%	NDP	61.1%	31,659	14,087	7,492	5,066	–	320	58,624
Whitby	PC	PC	26,471	45.8%	5,313	9.2%	NDP	60.3%	26,471	21,158	7,441	1,958	–	768	57,796
Willowdale	Lib	PC	17,732	43.6%	6,917	17.0%	Lib	50.5%	17,732	10,481	10,815	932	233	453	40,646
Windsor—Tecumseh	NDP	NDP	25,221	58.4%	13,544	31.4%	PC	47.8%	11,677	25,221	3,513	1,909	863	–	43,183
Windsor West	NDP	NDP	20,276	52.1%	9,203	23.7%	PC	43.3%	11,073	20,276	5,722	1,393	–	435	38,899
York Centre	Lib	PC	18,434	50.1%	9,817	26.7%	NDP	52.9%	18,434	8,617	7,865	843	–	1,002	36,761
York—Simcoe	PC	PC	26,050	57.3%	15,395	33.8%	NDP	54.9%	26,050	10,655	6,182	2,195	–	409	45,491
York South—Weston	Lib	NDP	13,455	36.1%	1,165	3.1%	PC	49.2%	12,290	13,455	10,379	946	–	228	37,298
Kiiwetinoong	New	NDP	3,232	49.9%	1,467	22.7%	PC	45.8%	1,765	3,232	983	406	–	91	6,477
Mushkegowuk—James Bay	New	NDP	4,827	51.8%	2,032	21.8%	PC	54.0%	2,795	4,827	1,332	167	–	203	9,324

=== Comparative analysis for ridings (2018 vs 2014) ===
Summary of riding results by turnout and vote share for winning candidate (vs 2014) (Note: Summarized from "Data Explorer". Elections Ontario. Archived from the original on March 30, 2022.)
Riding and winning party			Turnout		Vote share	
Riding and winning party			%	Change (pp)	%	Change (pp)
Ajax	PC	Gain	54.63	4.45	39.05	9.88
Algoma—Manitoulin	NDP	Hold	53.08	3.70	58.56	5.15
Aurora—Oak Ridges—Richmond Hill	PC	New	55.43	New	56.03	New
Barrie—Innisfil	PC	Gain	54.27	5.09	49.97	13.87
Barrie—Springwater—Oro-Medonte	PC	New	57.05	New	44.75	New
Bay of Quinte	PC	Gain	56.46	4.85	48.02	6.31
Beaches—East York	NDP	Gain	61.16	5.02	48.21	9.24
Brampton Centre	NDP	New	50.35	New	38.37	New
Brampton East	NDP	Hold	51.67	6.64	46.92	2.61
Brampton North	NDP	Gain	51.58	6.24	37.55	5.56
Brampton South	PC	New	49.95	New	41.01	New
Brampton West	PC	Gain	47.67	5.17	39.39	15.05
Brantford—Brant	PC	Gain	57.17	4.66	42.00	12.03
Bruce—Grey—Owen Sound	PC	Hold	58.39	4.45	54.70	7.15
Burlington	PC	Gain	63.45	5.72	40.45	3.46
Cambridge	PC	Gain	55.17	6.22	36.97	4.41
Carleton	PC	New	62.00	New	51.33	New
Chatham-Kent—Leamington	PC	Hold	56.79	5.46	51.92	14.09
Davenport	NDP	Gain	55.82	6.26	60.27	20.12
Don Valley East	Lib	Hold	55.22	7.38	35.93	-19.79
Don Valley North	PC	New	53.81	New	44.44	New
Don Valley West	Lib	Hold	61.27	7.37	38.89	-18.13
Dufferin—Caledon	PC	Hold	56.57	5.09	53.08	13.23
Durham	PC	Gain	59.94	4.23	46.99	12.71
Eglinton—Lawrence	PC	Gain	60.11	6.12	40.38	6.62
Elgin—Middlesex—London	PC	Hold	59.45	5.47	55.46	9.10
Essex	NDP	Hold	56.12	5.92	47.95	-12.39
Etobicoke Centre	PC	Gain	61.91	5.43	43.00	10.27
Etobicoke—Lakeshore	PC	Gain	58.61	4.88	38.35	4.00
Etobicoke North	PC	Gain	50.58	7.87	52.48	29.74
Flamborough—Glanbrook	PC	New	60.58	New	43.53	New
Glengarry—Prescott—Russell	PC	Gain	55.42	2.06	40.98	8.41
Guelph	Green	Gain	61.12	5.65	45.03	25.74
Haldimand—Norfolk	PC	Hold	59.20	5.23	57.10	4.88
Haliburton—Kawartha Lakes—Brock	PC	Hold	59.66	3.68	56.71	15.75
Hamilton Centre	NDP	Hold	48.91	4.15	65.25	13.24
Hamilton East—Stoney Creek	NDP	Hold	53.06	4.22	51.15	4.34
Hamilton Mountain	NDP	Hold	56.16	3.32	54.58	7.68
Hamilton West—Ancaster—Dundas	NDP	Gain	62.26	3.23	43.19	27.59
Hastings—Lennox and Addington	PC	New	59.10	New	50.25	New
Humber River—Black Creek	NDP	Gain	47.26	5.01	37.42	-1.80
Huron—Bruce	PC	Hold	63.51	3.55	52.36	13.35
Kanata—Carleton	PC	Hold	62.32	6.23	43.19	-4.29
Kenora—Rainy River	PC	Gain	54.12	7.40	48.57	23.07
King—Vaughan	PC	New	55.52	New	56.62	New
Kingston and the Islands	NDP	Gain	57.29	5.15	39.16	9.60
Kitchener Centre	NDP	Gain	58.27	5.99	43.38	20.58
Kitchener—Conestoga	PC	Hold	59.93	9.60	39.57	3.21
Kitchener South—Hespeler	PC	New	55.82	New	38.86	New
Lambton—Kent—Middlesex	PC	Hold	60.77	3.84	55.34	10.17
Lanark—Frontenac—Kingston	PC	Hold	62.03	8.08	52.03	8.51
Leeds—Grenville—Thousand Islands and Rideau Lakes	PC	Hold	60.22	7.36	61.27	5.20
London—Fanshawe	NDP	Hold	49.65	3.23	55.68	5.26
London North Centre	NDP	Gain	54.95	4.73	47.60	17.16
London West	NDP	Hold	60.56	4.52	55.33	14.97
Markham—Stouffville	PC	Gain	58.85	12.64	48.12	10.66
Markham—Thornhill	PC	New	52.21	New	50.45	New
Markham—Unionville	PC	Gain	54.74	10.20	62.43	28.46
Milton	PC	New	56.11	New	41.67	New
Mississauga Centre	PC	New	49.79	New	40.86	New
Mississauga East—Cooksville	PC	Gain	51.48	7.58	41.15	14.96
Mississauga—Erin Mills	PC	Gain	55.13	8.23	41.61	11.72
Mississauga—Lakeshore	PC	Gain	59.33	5.78	42.33	9.13
Mississauga—Malton	PC	Gain	48.37	6.90	39.12	11.89
Mississauga—Streetsville	PC	Gain	55.53	8.77	43.53	15.46
Nepean	PC	Hold	58.73	3.34	45.13	-1.64
Newmarket—Aurora	PC	Gain	58.97	5.57	47.71	10.28
Niagara Centre	NDP	Hold	56.13	2.92	44.23	-2.48
Niagara Falls	NDP	Hold	54.56	3.35	50.79	3.41
Niagara West	PC	Hold	63.28	4.68	52.81	10.99
Nickel Belt	NDP	Hold	55.42	5.42	63.50	0.89
Nipissing	PC	Hold	58.24	5.76	49.93	8.12
Northumberland—Peterborough South	PC	Gain	64.64	8.83	45.32	9.39
Oakville	PC	Gain	62.46	6.34	43.67	5.86
Oakville North—Burlington	PC	Gain	60.20	9.30	46.41	9.31
Orléans	Lib	Hold	62.77	3.43	39.05	-14.45
Oshawa	NDP	Hold	54.58	4.39	44.88	-1.82
Ottawa Centre	NDP	Gain	61.20	4.36	46.08	25.61
Ottawa South	Lib	Hold	56.92	3.21	39.63	-10.33
Ottawa—Vanier	Lib	Hold	51.47	2.61	42.86	-12.69
Ottawa West—Nepean	PC	Gain	57.04	1.10	32.82	-1.06
Oxford	PC	Hold	59.25	7.32	55.73	9.49
Parkdale—High Park	NDP	Hold	62.43	5.55	59.41	18.64
Parry Sound—Muskoka	PC	Hold	59.22	7.10	48.07	7.34
Perth—Wellington	PC	Hold	60.35	4.69	50.67	11.71
Peterborough—Kawartha	PC	Hold	62.74	5.45	37.68	7.85
Pickering—Uxbridge	PC	Gain	58.90	4.12	42.20	13.90
Renfrew—Nipissing—Pembroke	PC	Hold	59.74	5.42	69.19	8.13
Richmond Hill	PC	Gain	52.18	6.49	51.24	14.70
St. Catharines	NDP	Gain	58.06	3.25	36.61	12.21
Sarnia—Lambton	PC	Hold	60.89	3.54	52.75	11.73
Sault Ste. Marie	PC	Gain	54.49	3.72	42.03	29.63
Scarborough—Agincourt	PC	Gain	51.35	5.31	50.40	15.77
Scarborough Centre	PC	Gain	53.19	5.10	38.45	16.87
Scarborough—Guildwood	Lib	Hold	52.93	3.69	33.34	-16.55
Scarborough North	PC	Gain	50.76	3.28	51.05	23.89
Scarborough—Rouge Park	PC	New	55.54	New	38.61	New
Scarborough Southwest	NDP	Gain	56.04	6.12	45.66	22.01
Simcoe—Grey	PC	Hold	57.08	5.08	55.93	8.81
Simcoe North	PC	Hold	58.88	5.55	46.92	2.96
Spadina—Fort York	NDP	Gain	53.56	4.23	49.62	19.25
Stormont—Dundas—South Glengarry	PC	Hold	54.10	2.08	61.51	9.79
Sudbury	NDP	Hold	54.22	2.30	48.07	5.83
Thornhill	PC	Hold	56.16	8.33	61.13	17.14
Thunder Bay—Atikokan	NDP	Gain	54.74	5.72	36.26	8.15
Thunder Bay—Superior North	Lib	Hold	53.84	3.43	39.86	-16.11
Timiskaming—Cochrane	NDP	Hold	53.08	2.41	61.20	5.72
Timmins	NDP	Hold	48.12	2.96	57.43	6.25
Toronto Centre	NDP	Gain	54.30	3.45	53.66	37.76
Toronto—Danforth	NDP	Hold	61.58	6.28	64.25	19.64
Toronto—St. Paul's	NDP	Gain	60.71	3.60	35.96	25.90
University—Rosedale	NDP	New	56.63	New	49.66	New
Vaughan—Woodbridge	PC	Gain	55.96	11.27	50.50	22.33
Waterloo	NDP	Hold	61.80	6.85	50.54	13.11
Wellington—Halton Hills	PC	Hold	61.11	5.50	54.00	7.39
Whitby	PC	Hold	60.32	5.97	45.80	5.15
Willowdale	PC	Gain	50.52	3.64	43.63	10.16
Windsor—Tecumseh	NDP	Hold	47.83	5.06	58.40	-3.75
Windsor West	NDP	Hold	43.30	0.60	52.12	10.72
York Centre	PC	Gain	52.92	6.18	50.15	18.68
York—Simcoe	PC	Hold	54.92	7.39	57.26	16.86
York South—Weston	NDP	Gain	49.17	3.03	36.07	-1.18
Kiiwetinoong	NDP	New	45.80	New	49.90	New
Mushkegowuk—James Bay	NDP	New	54.05	New	51.77	New

=== Detailed results and analysis ===
Elections to the 42nd Parliament of Ontario (2018)
Political party	Party leader	MPPs					Votes		
Political party	Party leader	Candidates	2014	Dissol.	2018	±	#	%	± (pp)
Progressive Conservative	Doug Ford	124	28	27	76	48▲	2,326,523	40.19%	9.08▲
New Democratic	Andrea Horwath	124	21	18	40	19▲	1,929,966	33.34%	9.68▲
Liberal	Kathleen Wynne	124	58	55	7	51▼	1,124,346	19.42%	19.10▼
Green	Mike Schreiner	124	–	–	1	1▲	264,519	4.57%	0.31▼
Libertarian	Allen Small	117	–	–	–	–	42,822	0.74%	0.04▼
None of the Above	Greg Vezina	42	–	–	–	–	16,146	0.28%	0.20▲
Independents and no affiliation		32	–	2	–	–	8,226	0.14%	0.06▲
Trillium	Bob Yaciuk	26	–	1	–	–	8,091	0.14%	0.13▲
Northern Ontario	Trevor Holliday	10	–	–	–	–	5,912	0.10%	0.08▲
Consensus Ontario	Brad Harness	10	–	–	–	–	2,682	0.05%	New
Freedom	Paul McKeever	14	–	–	–	–	2,565	0.04%	0.20▼
Ontario Party	Jason Tysick	5	–	–	–	–	2,316	0.04%	New
Moderate	Yuri Duboisky	16	–	–	–	–	2,199	0.04%	0.03▲
Communist	Dave McKee	12	–	–	–	–	1,471	0.03%	0.01▼
Canadians' Choice Party	Bahman Yazdanfar	5	–	–	–	–	1,239	0.02%	0.01▼
Stop the New Sex-Ed Agenda	Queenie Yu	3	–	–	–	–	1,078	0.02%	New
Ontario Alliance	Joshua E. Eriksen	3	–	–	–	–	802	0.01%	New
New People's Choice Party	Daryl Christoff	3	–	–	–	–	634	0.01%	New
Special Needs	Hilton Milan	5	–	–	–	–	631	0.01%	Steady
People's Political Party	Kevin Clarke	6	–	–	–	–	628	0.01%	0.01▼
Confederation of Regions	vacant	2	–	–	–	–	386	0.01%	Steady
Stop Climate Change	Ken Ranney	2	–	–	–	–	340	0.01%	New
Canadian Economic Party	Patrick Knight	2	–	–	–	–	321	0.01%	New
Go Vegan	Paul Figueiras	2	–	–	–	–	256	–	0.02▼
Cultural Action Party	Arthur Smitherman	3	–	–	–	–	215	–	New
Multicultural Party of Ontario	Wasyl Luczkiw	2	–	–	–	–	191	–	New
Party of Objective Truth	Derrick Matthews	2	–	–	–	–	176	–	New
Pauper	John Turmel	2	–	–	–	–	112	–	Steady
Social Reform Party	Abu Alam	2	–	–	–	–	67	–	New
Vacant				4					
Declined ballots							22,684		
Blank and invalid ballots							38,742		
Total		825	107	107	124		5,806,286	100.00%	
Registered voters / turnout							10,246,066	56.67%	5.38▲

Incumbents MPPs who lost their seats

38 incumbent Liberal MPPs lost their re-election races, as well as a one Trillium party MPP.

- ‡ means that the Incumbent was originally from a different riding
- "b.e." is a short term for "By-election"

Constituency	Party	Name	Year first elected	Seat held by party since	Defeated by	Party
Ottawa Centre	█ Liberal	Yasir Naqvi	2007	1995	Joel Harden	█ New Democratic
Ottawa West-Nepean	█ Liberal	Bob Chiarelli	2010 b.e. (previously served from 1987-1997)	2003	Jeremy Roberts	█ Progressive Conservative
Kingston and the Islands	█ Liberal	Sophie Kiwala	2014	1995	Ian Arthur	█ New Democratic
Barrie-Innisfil	█ Liberal	Ann Hogarth ‡	2014	(new riding)	Andrea Khanjin	█ Progressive Conservative
Northumberland—Peterborough South	█ Liberal	Lou Rinaldi ‡	2014 (previously served from 2003-2011)	(new riding)	David Piccini	█ Progressive Conservative
Peterborough—Kawartha	█ Liberal	Jeff Leal	2003	2003	Dave Smith	█ Progressive Conservative
Ajax	█ Liberal	Joe Dickson‡	2007	(new riding)	Rod Phillips	█ Progressive Conservative
Durham	█ Liberal	Granville Anderson	2014	2014	Lindsey Park	█ Progressive Conservative
Brampton North	█ Liberal	Harinder Malhi	2014	(new riding)	Kevin Yarde	█ New Democratic
Brampton West	█ Liberal	Vic Dhillon	2003	2007 (riding created)	Amarjot Sandhu	█ Progressive Conservative
Mississauga East—Cooksville	█ Liberal	Dipika Damerla	2011	2007 (riding created)	Kaleed Rasheed	█ Progressive Conservative
Mississauga—Lakeshore	█ Liberal	Charles Sousa	2007	2007	Rudy Cuzetto	█ Progressive Conservative
Mississauga—Malton	█ Liberal	Amrit Mangat	2007	(new riding)	Deepak Anand	█ Progressive Conservative
Mississauga—Streetsville	█ Liberal	Bob Delaney	2003	2007 (riding created)	Nina Tangri	█ Progressive Conservative
Markham—Stouffville	█ Liberal	Helena Jaczek	2007	(new riding)	Paul Calandra	█ Progressive Conservative
Newmarket—Aurora	█ Liberal	Chris Ballard	2014	2014	Christine Elliott	█ Progressive Conservative
Richmond Hill	█ Liberal	Reza Moridi	2007	2007 (riding created)	Daisy Wai	█ Progressive Conservative
Vaughan—Woodbridge	█ Liberal	Steven Del Duca	2012 b.e.	(new riding)	Michael Tibollo	█ Progressive Conservative
Scarborough—Agincourt	█ Liberal	Soo Wong	2011	1987 (riding created)	Aris Babikian	█ Progressive Conservative
Scarborough Southwest	█ Liberal	Lorenzo Berardinetti	2003	2003	Doly Begum	█ New Democratic
Eglinton—Lawrence	█ Liberal	Michael Colle	1995	1999 (riding created)	Robin Martin	█ Progressive Conservative
Willowdale	█ Liberal	David Zimmer	2003	2003	Stan Cho	█ Progressive Conservative
Beaches—East York	█ Liberal	Arthur Potts	2014	2014	Rima Berns-McGown	█ New Democratic
Davenport	█ Liberal	Cristina Martins	2014	2014	Marit Stiles	█ New Democratic
Spadina—Fort York	█ Liberal	Han Dong	2014	(new riding)	Chris Glover	█ New Democratic
Etobicoke Centre	█ Liberal	Yvan Baker	2014	2003	Kinga Surma	█ Progressive Conservative
Etobicoke—Lakeshore	█ Liberal	Peter Milczyn	2014	2014	Christine Hogarth	█ Progressive Conservative
Etobicoke North	█ Liberal	Shafiq Qaadri	2003	2003	Doug Ford	█ Progressive Conservative
York South—Weston	█ Liberal	Laura Albanese	2007	2007	Faisal Hassan	█ New Democratic
Burlington	█ Liberal	Eleanor McMahon	2014	2014	Jane McKenna	█ Progressive Conservative
Milton	█ Liberal	Indira Naidoo-Harris	2014	(new riding)	Parm Gill	█ Progressive Conservative
Oakville	█ Liberal	Kevin Flynn	2003	2003	Stephen Crawford	█ Progressive Conservative
Hamilton West—Ancaster—Dundas	█ Liberal	Ted McMeekin	2000 b.e.	(new riding)	Sandy Shaw	█ New Democratic
St. Catharines	█ Liberal	Jim Bradley	1977	1977	Jennie Stevens	█ New Democratic
Cambridge	█ Liberal	Kathryn McGarry	2014	2014	Belinda Karahalios	█ Progressive Conservative
Kitchener Centre	█ Liberal	Daiene Vernile	2014	2003	Laura Mae Lindo	█ New Democratic
Sudbury	█ Liberal	Glenn Thibeault	2015 b.e.	2015 b.e.	Jamie West	█ New Democratic
Thunder Bay—Atikokan	█ Liberal	Bill Mauro	2003	1999 (riding created)	Judith Monteith-Farrell	█ New Democratic
Kanata—Carleton	█ Trillium	Jack MacLaren	2011 (as a PC)	2017 (floor crossing)	Merrilee Fullerton	█ Progressive Conservative

Principal races, according to 1st and 2nd-place results
Parties		Seats
█ Progressive Conservative	█ New Democratic	90
█ Progressive Conservative	█ Liberal	22
█ Progressive Conservative	█ Green	1
█ New Democratic	█ Liberal	11
Total		124

Candidates ranked 1st to 5th place, by party
Parties	1st	2nd	3rd	4th	5th	Total
█ Progressive Conservative	76	37	11			124
█ New Democratic	40	61	23			124
█ Liberal	7	26	88	3		124
█ Green	1		2	117	4	124
█ Libertarian				1	77	78
█ None of the Above					20	20
█ Northern Ontario				2	10	12
█ Independent				1	10	11
█ Trillium					8	8
█ Ontario Party					5	5

=== Regional analysis ===
Elections to the Legislative Assembly of Ontario – seats won by region (2018)
Party	Toronto	905 Belt	Ham/Niagara	Central	East	Midwest	Southwest	North	Total
Progressive Conservative	11	21	6	10	11	9	4	4	76
New Democratic	11	4	7		2	2	6	8	40
Liberal	3				3			1	7
Green						1			1
Total	25	25	13	10	16	12	10	13	124

=== Most marginal 2-way and 3-way contests ===
Top 10 marginal 2-way contests (2018)
Riding	1st	2nd	1st vs 2nd
Scarborough—Guildwood	33.3%	33.1%	0.2%
Thunder Bay—Atikokan	36.2%	36.0%	0.2%
Brampton Centre	38.4%	38.1%	0.3%
Ottawa West—Nepean	32.8%	32.5%	0.3%
Don Valley West	38.9%	38.5%	0.4%
Brantford—Brant	42.0%	40.9%	1.1%
Brampton North	37.5%	36.3%	1.2%
Sault Ste. Marie	42.0%	40.7%	1.3%
Brampton West	39.4%	38.1%	1.3%
Kitchener—Conestoga	39.6%	38.0%	1.6%

Top 10 marginal 3-way contests (2018)
Riding	1st	2nd	3rd	1st vs 3rd
Ottawa West—Nepean	32.8%	32.5%	29.3%	3.5%
Scarborough—Guildwood	33.3%	33.1%	27.6%	5.7%
York South—Weston	36.1%	33.0%	27.8%	8.3%
Don Valley East	35.9%	33.1%	27.4%	8.5%
Humber River—Black Creek	37.4%	30.3%	27.9%	9.5%
Toronto—St. Paul's	36.0%	33.4%	26.3%	9.7%
St. Catharines	36.6%	33.6%	24.5%	12.1%
Ottawa South	39.6%	29.2%	27.2%	12.4%
Thunder Bay—Atikokan	36.2%	36.0%	23.2%	13.0%
Kingston and the Islands	39.2%	27.5%	26.1%	13.1%

=== Significant results among independent and minor party candidates ===
Those candidates not belonging to a major party, receiving more than 1,000 votes in the election, are listed below:

Riding	Party	Candidates	Votes	Placed
Algoma—Manitoulin	█ N.Ont. Heritage	Tommy Lee	1,366	4th
Kanata—Carleton	█ Trillium	Jack MacLaren	1,947	5th
Mississauga—Malton	█ Independent	Caroline Roach	1,187	4th
Scarborough Centre	█ Libertarian	Matthew Dougherty	1,040	4th
Timiskaming—Cochrane	█ N.Ont. Heritage	Shawn Poirier	1,105	4th

== Student Vote results ==
Student Vote elections are mock elections that run parallel to real elections, in which students not of voting age participate. They are administered by CIVIX Canada, in partnership with Elections Ontario. Student Vote elections are for educational purposes and do not count towards the actual results.

Summary of the 2018 Ontario Student Vote
Party	Leader	Seats			Votes		
Party	Leader	Elected	2014	±	#	%	Change
New Democratic	Andrea Horwath	68	41	▲27	88,177	32.35%	▲5.75
Progressive Conservative	Doug Ford	45	25	▲20	72,803	26.71%	▲5.71
Liberal	Kathleen Wynne	10	39	▼29	51,221	18.79%	▼7.11
Green	Mike Schreiner	2	2	Steady	35,368	12.97%	▼3.43
Others		0	0	0	24,769	9.08%	▼0.72
Valid votes					268,091	95.51%	—N/a
Rejected ballots					12,600	4.49%	—N/a
Total votes cast		125*	107	Steady	280,691	—N/a	—N/a

== Opinion polls ==
=== Campaign period ===
Evolution of voting intentions during the 2018 Ontario provincial election campaign. Plot generated in R from data in the table below. Trendlines are local regressions, with polls weighted by proximity in time and sample size. 95% confidence ribbons represent uncertainty about the regressions, not the likelihood that actual election results would fall within the intervals.

Polling firm	Last date of polling	Link	Liberal	Progressive Conservative	New Democratic	Green	Other	Margin of error	Sample size	Polling method	Lead
Election	June 7, 2018	Archive	19.6	40.5	33.6	4.6	1.7				6.9
Forum Research	June 6, 2018	PDF	21	39	34	5	1	±3 pp	2,178	IVR	5
Research Co.	June 6, 2018	HTML	20	39	37	4	1	±3.8 pp	661	Online	2
EKOS	June 6, 2018	PDF	18.9	39.1	35.1	4.5	2.4	±2.8 pp	1,230	IVR	4.0
Pollara	June 5, 2018	PDF	17	38	38	6	2	±3.3 pp	906 (1/3)	Online/telephone (rolling)	0
Ipsos	June 5, 2018	HTML	19	39	36		6*	±3.1 pp	1,501	Online/telephone	3
Mainstreet Research	June 4, 2018	HTML	20.2	39.0	34.3	4.9	1.7	±1.7 pp	3,320	IVR	4.7
Leger	June 4, 2018	HTML	18	39	38		5*	N/A	1,008	Online	1
Pollara	June 4, 2018	PDF	17	39	37	6	1	±3.0 pp	1,083 (1/4)	Online/telephone (rolling)	2
Pollara	June 3, 2018	PDF	20	38	37	5	1	±2.7 pp	1,275 (1/4)	Online/telephone (rolling)	1
Forum Research	June 2, 2018	PDF	18	38	37	5	2	±3 pp	2,349	IVR	1
Abacus Data	June 2, 2018	HTML	23	33	37	5	2	±1.9 pp	2,646	Online	4
Pollara	June 2, 2018	PDF	20	37	37	5	1	±2.6 pp	1,447	Online/telephone	0
EKOS	May 31, 2018	PDF	19.3	38.6	34.9	5.9	1.2	±3.1 pp	990 (2/3)	IVR (rolling)	3.7
Research Co.	May 31, 2018	HTML	18	38	39	4	1	±3.7 pp	701	Online	1
Forum Research	May 29, 2018	PDF	19	39	35	5	2	±2 pp	2,602	IVR	4
H+K Strategies	May 29, 2018	HTML	19	37	39	6		±2.5 pp	1,500	Online	2
EKOS	May 29, 2018	PDF	19.1	37.9	38.4	3.3	1.3	±3.2 pp	945	IVR	0.5
Angus Reid	May 29, 2018	PDF	17	37	39	5	2	±3.5 pp	773	Online	2
Innovative Research	May 29, 2018	PDF	22	34	36	6	2	N/A	958	Online	2
Innovative Research	May 29, 2018	PDF	21	34	37	6	1	±4.0 pp	611	Telephone	3
Pollara	May 28, 2018	PDF	17	32	43	5	2	±3.5 pp	800	Online	11
Media consortium leaders' debate in Toronto (May 27, 2018)
Mainstreet Research	May 27, 2018	HTML	16.0	37.9	39.3	4.5	2.4	±2.39 pp	1,682	IVR	1.4
Ipsos	May 27, 2018	HTML	22	37	34		7*	±3.2 pp	1,241	Online/telephone	3
Abacus Data	May 26, 2018	HTML	23	33	37	4	2	±3.5 pp	800	Online	4
EKOS	May 24, 2018	PDF	20.4	34.9	35.6	7.0	2.1	±3.1 pp	1,021	IVR	0.7
Forum Research	May 23, 2018	PDF	14	33	47	4	2	±3 pp	906	IVR	14
Innovative Research	May 23, 2018	PDF	26	36	31	6	1	N/A	1,074	Online	5
Pollara	May 22, 2018	HTML	18	37	38	5	2	±3.3 pp	870	Online	1
Leger	May 22, 2018	PDF	21	37	37		5*	±3.09 pp	1,008	Online	0
Ipsos	May 21, 2018	HTML	23	36	37		4*	±3.5 pp	1,000	Online	1
Abacus Data	May 18, 2018	HTML	24	35	34	5	2	±1.9 pp	2,824	Online	1
Mainstreet Research	May 18, 2018	HTML	22.3	41.9	29.3	5.0	1.4	±2.02 pp	2,350	IVR	12.6
EKOS	May 17, 2018	PDF	23.3	39.1	29.8	5.4	2.3	±2.9 pp	1,124	IVR	9.3
H+K Strategies	May 15, 2018	HTML	23	38	32		7*	±2.5 pp	1,500	Online	6
Ipsos	May 14, 2018	HTML	22	40	35		3*	±3.5 pp	1,000	Online	5
Innovative Research	May 12, 2018	PDF	27	35	31	6	1	N/A	1,529	Online	4
Leaders' debate in Parry Sound (May 11, 2018)
Mainstreet Research	May 11, 2018	HTML	22.1	42.3	28.4	5.4	1.8	±1.95 pp	2,534	IVR	13.9
Forum Research	May 9, 2018	PDF	22	40	33	4	2	±4 pp	777	IVR	7
Innovative Research	May 9, 2018	PDF	28	38	28	6	1	N/A	915	Online	10
City Toronto leaders' debate (May 7, 2018)

^{*}Includes support for the Green Party

==== Best Premier and Party Leader Approval Ratings ====
Date	Firm	Best Premier ratings			Approval ratings					
Date	Firm	Best Premier ratings			Ford		Horwath		Wynne	
Date	Firm	Ford	Horwath	Wynne	Approve	Disapprove	Approve	Disapprove	Approve	Disapprove
June 6, 2018	Research Co.				36%	55%	54%	34%	29%	64%
June 2, 2018	Forum Research	27%	31%	17%	27%	55%	41%	34%	23%	65%
June 2, 2018	Abacus Data				25%	48%	42%	20%	21%	56%
May 31, 2018	Research Co.	23%	28%	15%	33%	56%	52%	34%	27%	64%
May 29, 2018	Forum Research	29%	30%	16%	30%	53%	40%	32%	23%	65%
May 29, 2018	Angus Reid	25%	34%	15%						
May 29, 2018	Innovative Research	23%	30%	14%	30%	54%	48%	23%	25%	59%
May 26, 2018	Abacus Data				27%	45%	44%	15%	19%	60%
May 23, 2018	Forum Research	30%	33%	15%	32%	51%	43%	26%	19%	69%
May 23, 2018	Innovative Research	24%	26%	19%	27%	57%	46%	20%	24%	61%
May 22, 2018	Leger	23%	28%	12%						
May 18, 2018	Abacus Data				26%	46%	42%	13%	17%	60%
May 12, 2018	Innovative Research	24%	26%	16%	31%	52%	44%	17%	21%	62%
May 9, 2018	Forum Research				34%	49%	42%	25%	20%	71%

==== Major Regional Polls – Toronto ====
Polling firm	Last date of polling	Link	Lib	PC	NDP	Gre	Oth	Margin of error	Sample size	Polling method	Lead
Campaign Research	May 16, 2018	HTML	27	35	32	5	2	±2.3 pp	1,871	Online	3
Leaders' debate in Parry Sound (May 11, 2018)
Mainstreet Research	May 7, 2018	PDF	31.1	36.6	23.1	5.9	3.4	±2.19 pp	2,000	IVR	5.5
CityTV Toronto leaders' debate (May 7, 2018)

=== Pre-campaign period ===
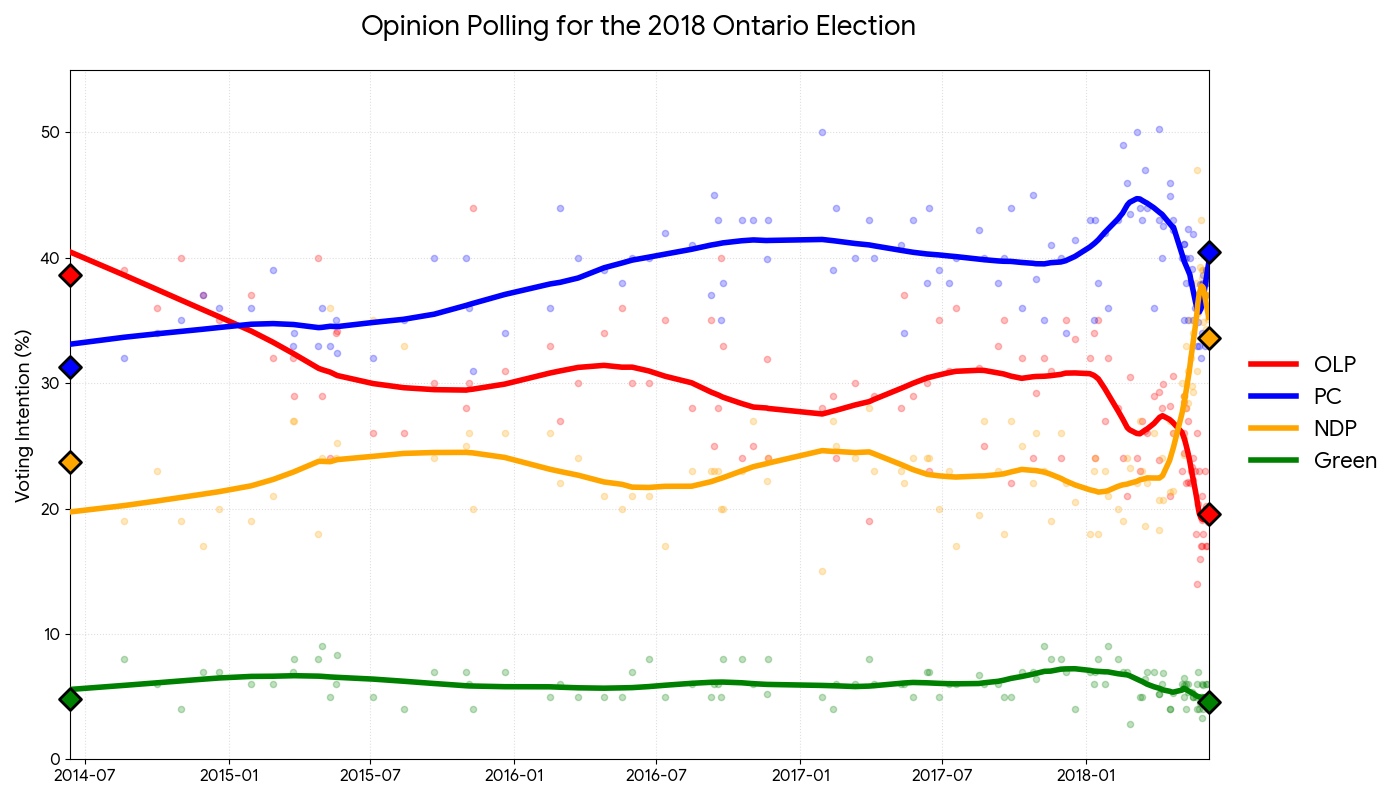
Opinion Polling for the 2018 Ontario General Election

Polling organisation	Last date of polling	Source	Lib	PC	NDP	Gr	Oth	Polling type	Sample size	Margin of error
Ipsos	May 7, 2018	HTML	26	40	29	–	5	Online/telephone	1,197	±3.2%
EKOS Research	May 6, 2018	Twitter	24.4	41.1	25.6	6.5	2	IVR	2,018	±2.2%
Abacus Data	May 6, 2018	HTML	29	35	29	5	2	Online	1,755	±2.4%
Nanos Research	May 6, 2018	PDF	28.5	41.1	24.3	5.9		Telephone	500	±4.4%
Pollara	May 4, 2018	HTML	23	40	30	6	1	Online	1,010	±3.1%
Leger	April 23, 2018	HTML	26	43	26	–		Online	1,000+	
Nanos Research	April 22, 2018	PDF	30.6	42.2	21.4	5.3		Telephone	2,098	±2.1%
Forum Research	April 18, 2018	PDF	21	46	27	4	2	IVR	1,126	±3%
Mainstreet Research	April 18, 2018	HTML	28.2	44.9	21.3	4.0	1.6	IVR	1,763	±2.33%
Ipsos	April 9, 2018	HTML	27	40	28	–	5	Online	800	±4.0%
Innovative Research	April 9, 2018	HTML	29.9	42.5	20.7	6.9	1.1	Online	600	±4.0%
Abacus Data	April 8, 2018	HTML	28	40	24	6	2	Online	4,177	±1.5%
EKOS Research	April 5, 2018	PDF	29.3	43.0	20.7	5.2	1.8	IVR	1,067	±3.0%
Mainstreet Research	April 4, 2018	HTML	23.9	50.3	18.3	5.2	2.4	IVR	1,969	±2.21%
Forum Research	March 29, 2018	PDF	29	36	26	7	2	IVR	728	±4%
Innovative Research	March 20, 2018	PDF	26	44	22	7	1	Telephone	603	±4.0%
Mainstreet Research	March 18, 2018	HTML	26.2	47.0	18.6	6.4	1.8	IVR	2,003	±2.23%
Campaign Research	March 14, 2018	HTML	27	43	23	5	1	Online	1,637	±2.4%
Leger	March 14, 2018	PDF	26	42	24	–	8	Online	1,008	±3.087%
Ipsos	March 14, 2018	HTML	32	39	25	–	3	Online	803	±4.0%
Forum Research	March 11, 2018	PDF	23	44	27	5	2	IVR	923	±3%
10 March 2018	Doug Ford is elected leader of the Progressive Conservative Party									
Angus Reid	March 7, 2018	PDF	24	50	22	–	4	Online	807	±3.4%
DART	February 27, 2018	PDF	19	44	24	–	13	Online	962	±3.6%
Nanos Research	February 26, 2018	PDF	30.5	43.5	23.2	2.8		Telephone	502	±4.4%
Forum Research	February 23, 2018	PDF	21	46	24	7	2	IVR	1,005	±3%
Ipsos	February 19, 2018	HTML	29	38	26	–	7	Online	802	±4.0%
Forum Research	February 17, 2018	PDF	24	49	19	7	2	IVR	949	±3%
Campaign Research	February 11, 2018	HTML	28	43	20	8	1	Online	1,426	±2.5%
Leger	January 2018	HTML	33	36	26			Online	996	±3.1%
Innovative Research	January 29, 2018	PDF	32	36	21	9	2	Online	1,027	
26 January 2018	Vic Fedeli is appointed as interim leader of the Ontario PC Party									
Forum Research	January 25, 2018	PDF	27	42	23	6	2	IVR	751	±4%
25 January 2018	Patrick Brown resigns as Ontario PC leader									
Innovative Research	January 17, 2018	PDF	35	38	18	8	1	Online	1,040	
Forum Research	January 13, 2018	PDF	24	43	24	7	2	IVR	1,022	±3%
Campaign Research	January 11, 2018	HTML	34	35	23	6	2	Online	1,544	±2.5%
Mainstreet Research	January 6, 2018	PDF	32	43	18	7		IVR	2,375	±2.01%
Nanos Research	December 18, 2017	PDF	33.5	41.4	20.5	4.0		Telephone	500	±4.4%
Ipsos	December 14, 2017	HTML	28	36	28	–	9	Online	829	±4.0%
Campaign Research	December 6, 2017	HTML	35	34	22	7	2	Online	1,495	±2.5%
Forum Research	November 30, 2017	PDF	24	40	26	8	2	IVR	861	±3%
Innovative Research	November 17, 2017	PDF	31	41	19	8	1	Telephone	607	±4.0%
Campaign Research	November 9, 2017	HTML	32	35	23	9	1	Online	1,263	±2.8%
Nanos Research	October 29, 2017	PDF	29.2	38.3	26.0	6.4		Telephone	500	±4.4%
Forum Research	October 25, 2017	PDF	24	45	22	7	2	IVR	946	±3%
Campaign Research	October 11, 2017	HTML	32	36	25	7	1	Online	1,347	±2.7%
Forum Research	September 27, 2017	PDF	22	44	27	5	2	IVR	801	±3%
Innovative Research	September 18, 2017	PDF	35	40	18	5	1	Telephone	608	±4.0%
Campaign Research	September 11, 2017	HTML	33	38	23	6	0	Online	1,133	±2.9%
Ipsos	September 11, 2017	HTML	32	39	22	–	7	Online	800	±4.0%
Forum Research	August 24, 2017	PDF	25	40	27	6	2	IVR	981	±3%
Nanos Research	August 17, 2017	PDF	31.2	42.2	19.5	6.7		Telephone	500	±4.4%
Innovative Research	July 19, 2017	HTML	36	40	17	6	1	Telephone	605	±4.0%
Campaign Research	July 10, 2017	HTML	31	38	23	6	1	Online	943	±3%
Innovative Research	June 27, 2017	HTML	35	39	20	5	1	Telephone	600	±4.0%
Forum Research	June 14, 2017	PDF	23	44	24	7	2	IVR	1,003	±3%
Campaign Research	June 12, 2017	HTML	30	38	24	7	1	Online	1,118	±3%
Mainstreet Research	May 25, 2017	HTML	29	43	24	5	–	IVR	2,000	±2.19%
Campaign Research	May 13, 2017	HTML	37	34	22	6	1	Online	864	±4%
Forum Research	May 10, 2017	PDF	28	41	23	6	3	IVR	1,103	±3%
Campaign Research	April 11, 2017	HTML	31	36	25			Online	979	±3%
Innovative Research	April 5, 2017	PDF	29	40	23	6	2	Online	779	
Forum Research	March 30, 2017	PDF	19	43	28	8	2	IVR	884	±3.3%
Mainstreet Research	March 12, 2017	HTML	30	40	24	6	–	IVR	2,531	±1.95%
Forum Research	February 16, 2017	PDF	24	44	25	6	2	IVR	1,120	±3%
Mainstreet Research	February 12, 2017	HTML	29	39	27	4	–	IVR	2,524	±1.95%
Campaign Research	January 29, 2017	HTML	28	50	15	5	2	IVR	676	±4%
Forum Research	November 21, 2016	PDF	24	43	24	8	2	IVR	1,184	±3%
Nanos Research	November 19, 2016	PDF	31.9	39.9	22.2	5.2	0.8	Telephone	500	±4.4%
Mainstreet Research	November 2, 2016	HTML	25	43	27	6	–	IVR	2,524	±1.95%
Forum Research	October 18, 2016	PDF	24	43	23	8	2	IVR	1,124	±3%
Innovative Research	September 24, 2016	PDF	33	38	20	8	–	Telephone	600	±4.0%
Ipsos	September 22, 2016	HTML	40	35	20	5	–	Online	800	±4%
Mainstreet Research	September 18, 2016	HTML	28	43	23	6	–	IVR	2,562	±1.94%
Forum Research	September 13, 2016	PDF	25	45	23	6	2	IVR	1,154	±3%
Ipsos	September 9, 2016	HTML	35	37	23	5	–	Online	800	±4%
8 September 2016	Premier Kathleen Wynne prorogues the legislature									
Forum Research	August 15, 2016	PDF	28	41	23	6	2	IVR	1,097	±3%
Forum Research	July 12, 2016	PDF	35	42	17	5	2	IVR	1,183	±3%
Forum Research	June 21, 2016	PDF	30	40	21	8	2	IVR	1,173	±3%
Forum Research	May 31, 2016	PDF	30	40	21	7	2	IVR	1,172	±3%
Mainstreet Research	May 18, 2016	HTML	36	38	20	5	–	IVR	2,537	±1.95%
Forum Research	April 25, 2016	PDF	34	39	21	5	2	IVR	1,157	±3%
Forum Research	March 23, 2016	PDF	30	40	24	5	2	IVR	1,225	±3%
Forum Research	February 29, 2016	PDF	27	44	22	6	2	IVR	1,148	±3%
Mainstreet Research	February 16, 2016	HTML	33	36	26	5	–	IVR	2,623	±1.91%
Forum Research	December 20, 2015	PDF	31	34	26	7	2	IVR	1,003	±3%
Ipsos	November 9, 2015	HTML	44	31	20	4	–	Online	1,002	±3.5%
Forum Research	November 4, 2015	PDF	30	36	26	6	1	IVR	1,158	±3%
Mainstreet Research	November 1, 2015	HTML	28	40	25	7	–	IVR	2,506	±1.96%
Mainstreet Research	September 21, 2015	HTML	30	40	24	7	–	IVR	4,610	±1.5%
Forum Research	August 13, 2015	PDF	26	35	33	4	2	IVR	1,001	±3%
Forum Research	July 5, 2015	PDF	26	32	35	5	2	IVR	678	±4%
Ipsos	May 20, 2015	HTML	34.13	32.37	25.19	8.31	–	Online	1,002	±3.5%
Innovative Research	May 19, 2015	PDF	34	35	24	6	–	Telephone	606	±4.0%
Forum Research	May 11, 2015	PDF	24	33	36	5	2	IVR	1,001	±3%
9 May 2015	Patrick Brown is elected leader of the Ontario PC Party									
Forum Research	April 30, 2015	PDF	29	36	24	9	2	IVR	912	±3%
Innovative Research	April 26, 2015	PDF	40	33	18	8	1	Online	1,017	
Forum Research	March 26, 2015	PDF	29	34	27	8	2	IVR	881	±3%
Environics	March 25, 2015	HTML	32	33	27	7	–	Telephone	989	±3.1%
Forum Research	February 27, 2015	PDF	32	39	21	6	2	IVR	996	±3%
Forum Research	January 30, 2015	PDF	37	36	19	6	2	IVR	1,028	±3%
Forum Research	December 20, 2014	PDF	35	36	20	7	2	IVR	1,058	±3%
Forum Research	November 29, 2014	PDF	37	37	17	7	2	IVR	1,054	±3%
Forum Research	November 1, 2014	PDF	40	35	19	4	2	IVR	1,104	±3%
Forum Research	October 1, 2014	PDF	36	34	23	6	1	IVR	1,079	±3%
Forum Research	August 21, 2014	PDF	39	32	19	8	2	IVR	1,229	±3%
2 July 2014	Jim Wilson becomes interim leader of the Ontario PC Party									
2 July 2014	Tim Hudak resigns as leader of the Ontario PC Party									
2014 election	June 12, 2014	HTML	38.65	31.25	23.75	4.84	1.51			
