= Brampton West—Mississauga (provincial electoral district) =

Former provincial electoral district in Ontario, Canada

Ontario electoral district

Defunct provincial electoral district
- Legislature: Legislative Assembly of Ontario
- District created: 1999
- District abolished: 2004
- First contested: 1999
- Last contested: 2003

Demographics
- Census division: Peel
- Census subdivision: Brampton

Brampton West—Mississauga was a provincial electoral district in central Ontario, Canada, that elected one Member of the Legislative Assembly of Ontario. It was created in 1999 from Mississauga North, Brampton North and Brampton South. It was abolished in 2007 into Brampton West, Mississauga—Brampton South and Mississauga—Streetsville.

The riding included Brampton west of a line following McLaughlin Road to Bovaird Drive to Main Street to Steeles Avenue to Kennedy Road plus Mississauga north of a line following Winston Churchill Boulevard south to the 401 east to the Credit River south to Eglinton Avenue east to the 403 north to the 401, west to Hurontario Street and then north.

== Members of Provincial Parliament ==
Parliament	Years	Member	Party
Created from parts of Mississauga North, Brampton North and Brampton South (1999)
37th	1999–2003	Tony Clement	PC
38th	2003–2007	Vic Dhillon	Liberal
Merged into Brampton West, Mississauga—Brampton South and Mississauga—Streetsville (2004)

== Election results ==
2003 Ontario general election
Party	Candidate	Votes	%	±%	Expenditures
Liberal	Vic Dhillon	28,926	46.18	+8.95	$84,782.33
Progressive Conservative	Tony Clement	26,414	42.17	–13.70	$108,691.97
New Democratic	Chris Moise	5,103	8.15	+1.81	$7,336.30
Family Coalition	Paul Micelli	1,122	1.79	–	no report filed
Green	Paul Simas	811	1.29	–	$1,000.06
Freedom	John G. Purdy	266	0.42	–	$0.00
Total valid votes		62,642	99.12		
Total rejected, unmarked and declined ballots		555	0.88	–0.23	
Turnout		63,197	50.84	–0.40	
Eligible voters		124,317			
Liberal gain from Progressive Conservative		Swing		+11.32	
Source: Elections Ontario

1999 Ontario general election
Party	Candidate	Votes	%	Expenditures
Progressive Conservative	Tony Clement	24,909	55.87	$71,283.13
Liberal	Vic Dhillon	16,599	37.23	$70,662.58
New Democratic	Johannes Devries	2,824	6.33	$7,000.00
Natural Law	Mei Sze Viau	252	0.57	$0.00
Total valid votes		44,584	98.89	
Total rejected, unmarked and declined ballots		501	1.11	
Turnout		45,085	51.23	
Eligible voters		88,003		
Progressive Conservative pickup new district.				
Source: Elections Ontario

== See also ==
- List of Ontario provincial electoral districts
- Canadian provincial electoral districts
