= Buck-a-beer =

Campaign slogan used by the Progressive Conservative Party of Ontario

Buck-a-beer was a campaign slogan used by the Progressive Conservative Party of Ontario, led by Doug Ford, during the 2018 Ontario general election. The party pledged to lower liquor pricing in the province, reducing the minimum price of beer from $1.25 to $1. Once implemented, however, the program saw low adoption by breweries and resellers.

== Background ==
Canadian provinces had been the first governments in the world to introduce minimum pricing of alcohol. In 2008, the government of Ontario, then led by the Ontario Liberal Party, increased the minimum pricing of a can of beer from $1.00 to $1.06. By 2018, the minimum price had been increased to $1.25.

== 2018 election ==
During the 2018 Ontario general election, the Progressive Conservative Party of Ontario, led by Doug Ford, called for the lowering of the price of alcohol in the province, pledged that if they formed the government, they would introduce "buck-a-beer" - sales of beer for one dollar per can. The pledge was characterised by some analysts as part of a wider populist campaign strategy.

Google Trends Data showed that "buck-a-beer" was the second most searched for term related to "Doug Ford" ahead of polling day. On 7 June 2018, the Progressive Conservative Party won a majority in the election, capturing 76 of the 124 seats in the Legislative Assembly of Ontario.

== Implementation ==
In early August 2018, Doug Ford held a press conference at Barley Days brewery in Picton, Ontario, to announce the official launch of the policy. The government would be lowering the minimum price of a can or bottle of beer from $1.25 to $1, beginning on 27 August 2018. Companies would not be required to lower their prices and the change would not be applied to draft beer. The change in minimum price additionally did not include bottle deposits. As well, the government would give away prime shelf space in Liquor Control Board of Ontario (LCBO) stores and adverts in the LCBO magazine to breweries that participated in the programme.

At the press conference, Ford defended the policy from critics, stating that "All I heard everywhere I went was buck-a-beer, buck-a-beer, buck-a-beer. So sometimes the media, ourselves even, we live in a bubble and you don’t realize some of the kitchen table issues people want to get done." A protest was held outside the brewery that day, demonstrating against Ford's government's repeal of the sex-ed curriculum, a broken campaign promise to continue the basic income pilot, as well as the cancellation of a local wind farm.

== Reception ==
Most craft brewers in the province rejected the policy, arguing that it would be impossible for them to reduce their prices to that extent without losing money or having to take steps such as lowering the quality of their beer or firing employees. Global News estimated that the cost to produce a single 355mL can of beer was as much as $1.69. Other critics pointed out that with inflation, the minimum pricing of $1 in 2008 would be equivalent to a minimum price of $1.16 in 2018. Some craft brewers also expressed concerns about the government's plans to give away prime shelf space in LCBO stores to companies that participated in the policy, arguing that it could significantly impact the sales of smaller breweries.

The policy also received opposition from public health and safety groups in the province, concerned about the impact the government's promotion of cheap beer would have on drinking habits. Tim Stockwell, director of the Canadian Institute for Substance Use Research, stated that "From a populist political point of view, it might do (Ford) some good because a lot of people like the idea of cheap beer. From a public health and safety point of view, it’s a lousy idea." MADD Canada stated that "Lower alcohol prices can lead to increased consumption, particularly among those with alcohol problems, and among young people, and that increased consumption can in turn lead to increased alcohol-related problems, including impaired driving."

The Ontario New Democratic Party opposed the policy, arguing that it was corporate welfare and that it demonstrated the government's misplaced priorities, especially as the government had just announced the cancellation of the Ontario Basic Income Pilot Project. Liberal MPP Nathalie Des Rosiers stated that the policy was "the symbol of Ontario populism."

== Impact ==
Only three breweries participated in the policy: Barley Days brewery, Cool Beer Brewing Company, and the President's Choice brand of beer. By the end of January 2019, Cool Beer Brewing was the only brewery still participating, however they restricted the buck-a-beer pricing to holiday long weekends only, stating that it was otherwise unsustainable. Loblaw Companies later launched a line of beer under its No Name brand. However, pricing matched the buck-a-beer range only for the weekend of its launch, the first long weekend of 2019 in Ontario.

Some experts argued that the policy ultimately had the effect of increasing beer prices in the province by as much as 10%, as loosening restrictions on pricing allowed companies to charge more than they previously had.

Around the time of the policy's launch in 2018, the Angus Reid Institute released a poll on Canadian voters' alcohol preferences, concluding that "while seemingly crowd-pleasing liquor policies may be quaffable for all, they may actually do relatively little to brew targeted support among specific segments of the voting population."

The policy has been referred to multiple times in satires of Doug Ford's government, such as by news satire outlet The Beaverton.

== See also ==
- Premiership of Doug Ford
- Liquor Control Board of Ontario
- Alcohol law
