= Vic Dhillon =

Canadian politician

Member of the Ontario Provincial Parliament for Brampton West Brampton West—Mississauga (2003–2007)
- In office October 2, 2003 – June 7, 2018
- Preceded by: Tony Clement
- Succeeded by: Amarjot Sandhu

Personal details
- Born: 1969 (age 56–57)
- Party: Liberal
- Occupation: Businessman

Vic Dhillon (born c. 1969) is a former politician in Ontario, Canada. He was a Liberal member of the Legislative Assembly of Ontario from 2003 to 2018 who represented the ridings of Brampton West—Mississauga and Brampton West.

== Background ==
Dhillon has lived in Brampton, Ontario for most of his life. He has a degree in business administration from Lakehead University, and helped found a family-owned business in Mississauga after his graduation. He has done fundraising work for the Brampton Food Bank, and led a local initiative to send supplies to eastern Ontario during the ice storm of 1998. Dhillon worked as a constituency assistant to federal Liberal Member of Parliament (MP) Gurbax Singh Malhi for five months after the 1993 federal election, and then worked as an executive assistant to Liberal MP Colleen Beaumier for over nine years.

== Politics ==
Dhillon ran in the 1999 provincial election as the Liberal candidate in the riding of Brampton West—Mississauga. He lost to high-profile Progressive Conservative cabinet minister Tony Clement by 8,310 votes. He ran again in the 2003 election and this time defeated Clement by 2,512 votes. Most political observers considered this to be a significant upset. Strong support from the riding's Indo-Canadian community was a factor, as was a provincial swing to the Liberals. He was elected without difficulty in 2007 in the new riding of Brampton West. He was re-elected in 2011, and 2014.

In 2004, Dhillon was credited by local residents with saving Knights Table, a non-profit diner that provides meals for Brampton's poor and homeless. According to a Toronto Star report, Dhillon introduced the diner's management to Jaswant Singh Birk, who in turn provided the establishment with a generous lease after its previous contract expired.

He was appointed as parliamentary assistant to the Minister of Government Services on September 20, 2006.

Dhillon supported Gerard Kennedy's bid to lead the Liberal Party of Canada in 2006. In December 2006, he introduced a private member's bill to protect transient workers from exploitation by hiring agencies. The bill was endorsed by the Toronto Star in the following week.

Dhillon took part in an Ontario government business mission to India in January 2007.

Until August 2016, Dhillon served as a Parliamentary Assistant to the Minister of Aboriginal Affairs. From August 2016 to May 2018, he served as Parliamentary Assistant to the Minister of Government and Consumer Services.

Dhillon ran for re-election in Brampton West in the 2018 Ontario election. He placed third, after the Progressive Conservative and New Democratic Party candidates.

== Electoral record ==
2018 Ontario general election: Brampton West
Party	Candidate	Votes	%	±%
Progressive Conservative	Amarjot Sandhu	14,951	39.39	+15.05
New Democratic	Jagroop Singh	14,461	38.09	+14.44
Liberal	Vic Dhillon	7,013	18.47	–26.76
Green	Julie Guillemet-Ackerman	999	2.63	–0.11
Libertarian	David Shaw	364	0.96	–0.64
Communist	Surjit Sahota	173	0.46	–
Total valid votes		37,961	99.30	
Total rejected, unmarked and declined ballots		268	0.70	–1.00
Turnout		38,229	47.67	+5.17
Eligible voters		80,196		
Progressive Conservative gain from Liberal		Swing		+20.91
Source: Elections Ontario

2014 Ontario general election
Party	Candidate	Votes	%	±%
Liberal	Vic Dhillon	24,832	45.23	+1.47
Progressive Conservative	Randeep Sandhu	13,363	24.34	−8.52
New Democratic	Gugni Gill Panaich	12,985	23.65	+4.69
Green	Sayyeda Ebrahim	1,504	2.74	−0.52
Libertarian	Luis Chacin	878	1.60	–
Family Coalition	Dan Sullivan	800	1.46	–
Freedom	Ted Harlson	540	0.98	−0.18
Total valid votes		54,902	100.0	
Total rejected, unmarked and declined ballots		952	1.70	
Turnout		55,854		
Eligible voters		131,434		
Liberal hold		Swing		+5.03
Source:Elections Ontario

2007 Ontario general election: Brampton West
Party	Candidate	Votes	%
Liberal	Vic Dhillon	20,746	46.19
Progressive Conservative	Mark Beckles	15,120	33.67
New Democratic	Garth Bobb	4,901	10.91
Green	Sanjeev Goel	3,471	7.73
Family Coalition	Norah Madden	488	1.09
Independent	Gurdial Singh Fiji	185	0.41
Total valid votes		44,911	98.96
Total rejected, unmarked and declined ballots		471	1.04
Turnout		45,382	43.92
Eligible voters		103,323	
Liberal pickup new district.			
Source: Elections Ontario

2003 Ontario general election: Brampton West—Mississauga
Party	Candidate	Votes	%	±%	Expenditures
Liberal	Vic Dhillon	28,926	46.18	+8.95	$84,782.33
Progressive Conservative	Tony Clement	26,414	42.17	–13.70	$108,691.97
New Democratic	Chris Moise	5,103	8.15	+1.81	$7,336.30
Family Coalition	Paul Micelli	1,122	1.79	–	no report filed
Green	Paul Simas	811	1.29	–	$1,000.06
Freedom	John G. Purdy	266	0.42	–	$0.00
Total valid votes		62,642	99.12		
Total rejected, unmarked and declined ballots		555	0.88	–0.23	
Turnout		63,197	50.84	–0.40	
Eligible voters		124,317			
Liberal gain from Progressive Conservative		Swing		+11.32	
Source: Elections Ontario

1999 Ontario general election: Brampton West—Mississauga
Party	Candidate	Votes	%	Expenditures
Progressive Conservative	Tony Clement	24,909	55.87	$71,283.13
Liberal	Vic Dhillon	16,599	37.23	$70,662.58
New Democratic	Johannes Devries	2,824	6.33	$7,000.00
Natural Law	Mei Sze Viau	252	0.57	$0.00
Total valid votes		44,584	98.89	
Total rejected, unmarked and declined ballots		501	1.11	
Turnout		45,085	51.23	
Eligible voters		88,003		
Progressive Conservative pickup new district.				
Source: Elections Ontario
