= 2018 Progressive Conservative Party of Ontario leadership election =

Election in Ontario, Canada

- March 10, 2018
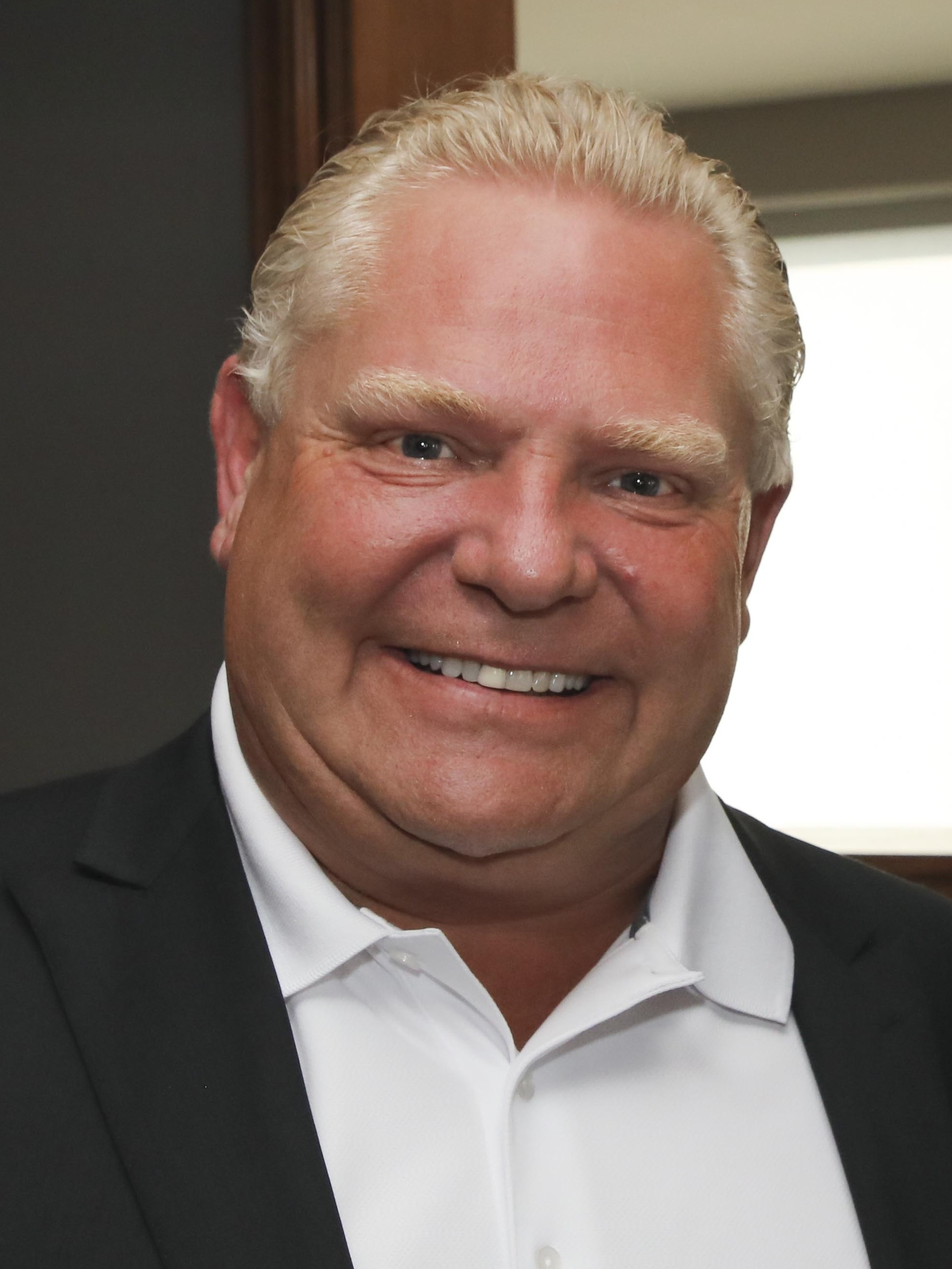

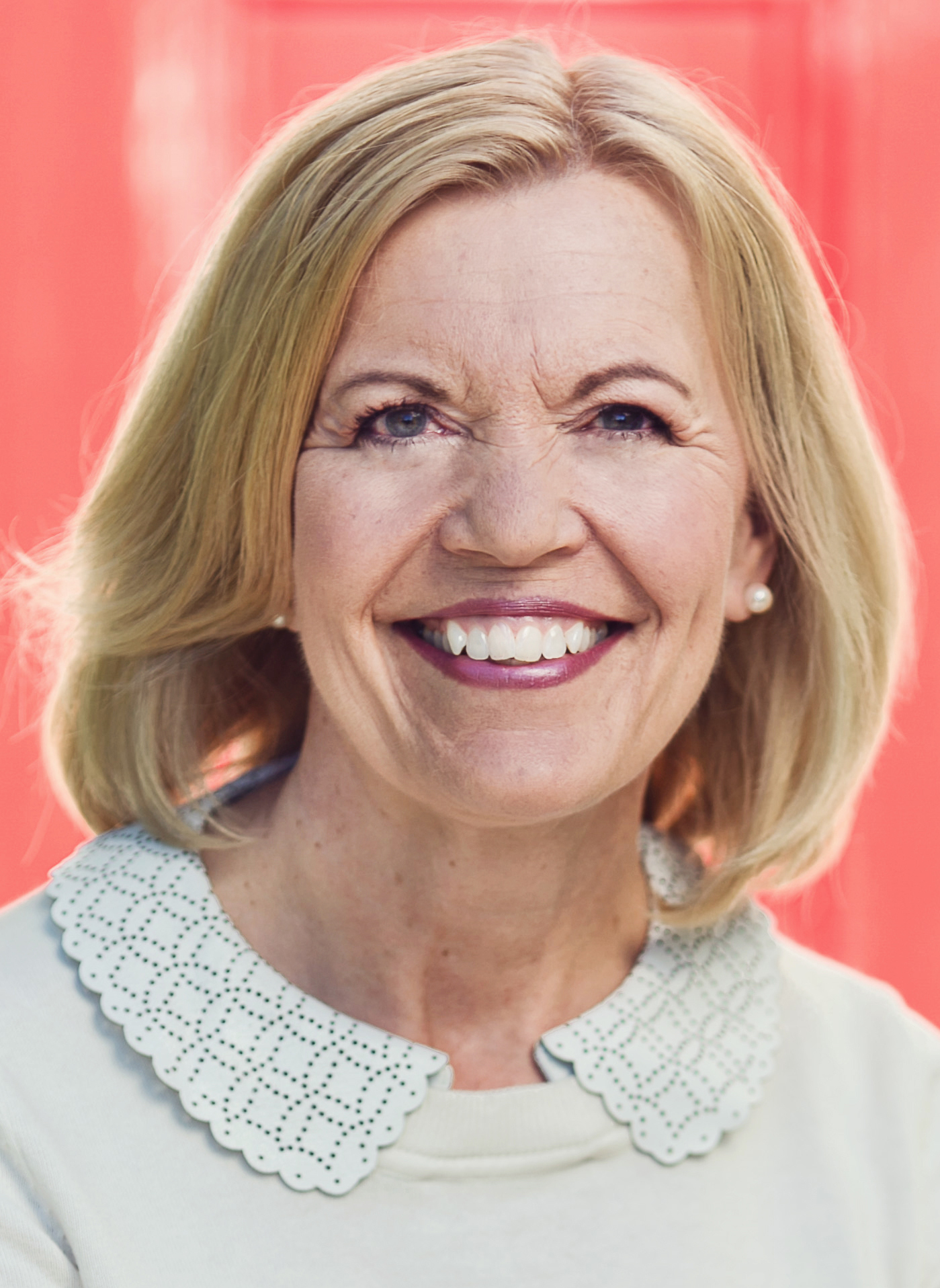

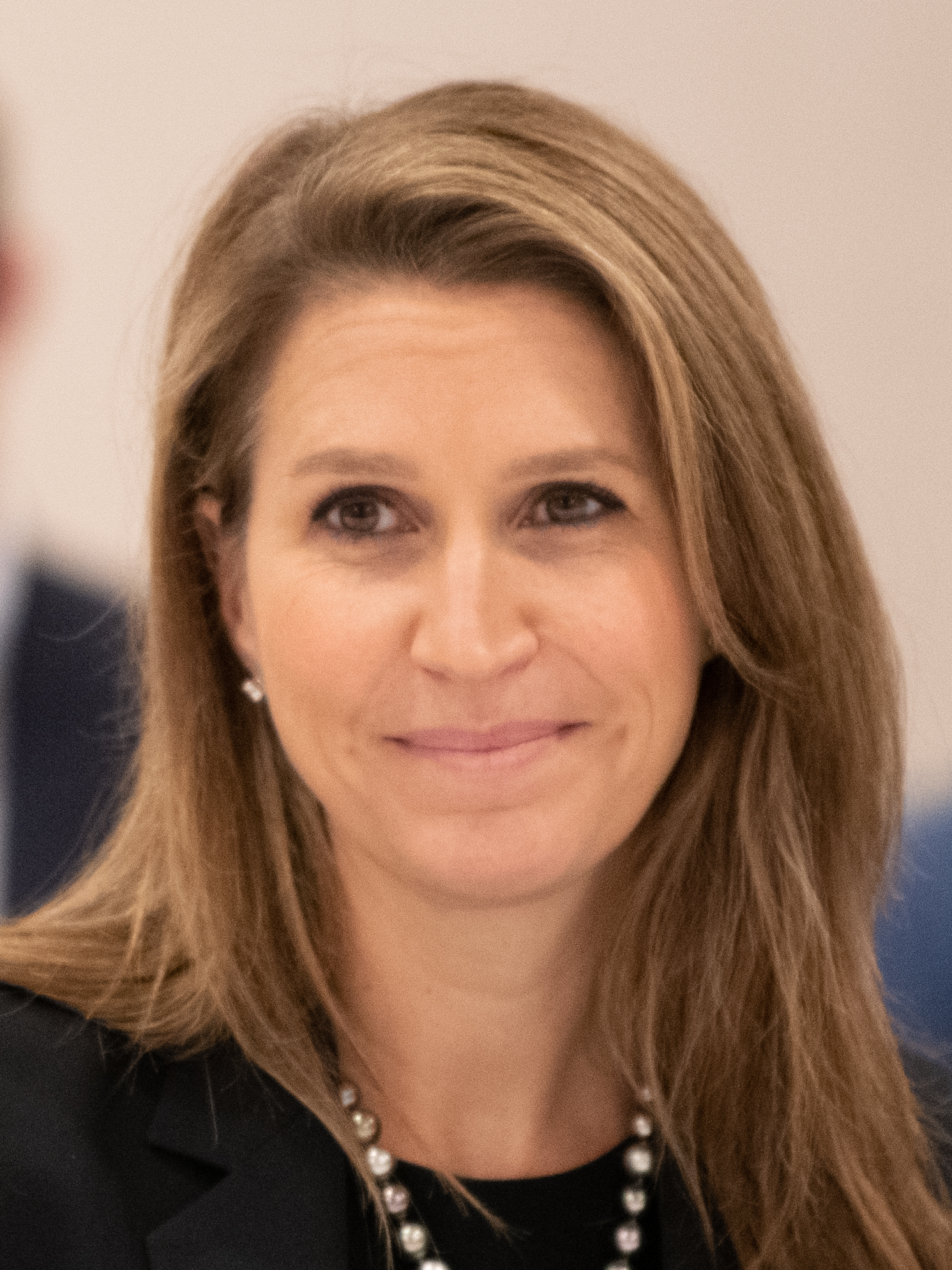

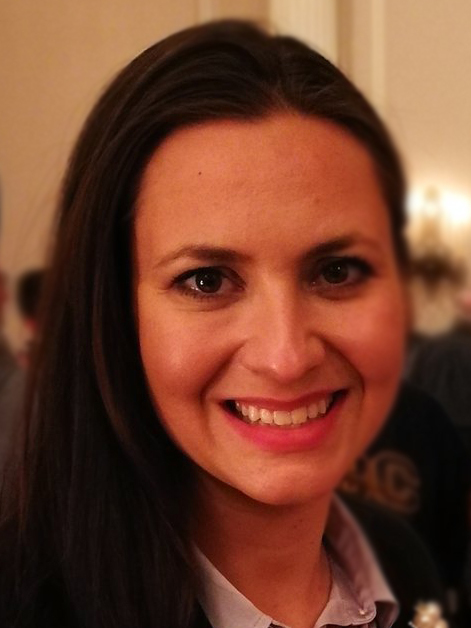
| Candidate | Doug Ford | Christine Elliott |
| Final ballot points | 6,202 (50.62%) | 6,049 (49.38%) |
| First ballot points | 4,091 (33.35%) | 4,187 (34.13%) |
| Candidate | Caroline Mulroney | Tanya Granic Allen |
| Final ballot points | Eliminated | Eliminated |
| First ballot points | 2,107 (17.18%) | 1,882 (15.34%) |
- Top Map: Results of the first round by plurality of points. Bottom Map: Results of the 3rd (final) round by plurality of points
Leader before election
Vic Fedeli (interim)
Elected Leader
Doug Ford

The 2018 Progressive Conservative Party of Ontario leadership election was held on March 10, 2018, due to the resignation of party leader Patrick Brown on January 25, 2018, following allegations of sexual misconduct. Winner Doug Ford narrowly defeated runner-up Christine Elliott on the third ballot with 50.6% of allocated points.

The Progressive Conservative Party of Ontario leadership election was scheduled for 3 months before the 2018 provincial election scheduled for June 7. It came after a turbulent year of disputed and allegedly fraudulent nominations contests across the province for local PC candidates. In two of these contests; Ottawa West—Nepean and Scarborough Centre the nominations were overturned after Brown's resignation and Brown's own nomination in Barrie—Springwater—Oro-Medonte was cancelled. At the time of the leadership election Newmarket—Aurora and five others remained under active investigation by the party and Hamilton West—Ancaster—Dundas remained under police investigation.

According to Article 23.1 of the PC party constitution, when there is a vacancy in the position of leader, the party caucus chooses an interim leader to serve until a new leader is elected in a leadership election, which must be held within 18 months of the vacancy occurring, and in which all party members can vote. Party president Rick Dykstra told the media on January 25 that "a leadership election will take place at such time as the PC party shall determine in its discretion". The party executive met on January 26, 2018, following the caucus election, to determine whether to have a leadership election before the provincial election, and if so, how it would proceed, or whether to have the interim leader lead the party into the election, and called the leadership election for March 2018.

== Rules and procedures ==
2018 Progressive Conservative Party of Ontario leadership election
- Date: March 10, 2018
- Convention: Hilton Toronto and Markham Suites Conference Centre, Markham, Ontario
- Resigning leader: Patrick Brown
- Won by: Doug Ford
- Ballots: 3
- Candidates: 4
- Entrance fee: $125,000 ($75,000 + $25,000 compliance deposit + $25,000 membership list access fee)
- Spending limit: $750,000

All party members are eligible to cast votes by preferential ballot using electronic balloting, provided that they are members in good standing by February 16, 2018. To be eligible, one must be at least 14 years of age, a resident of Ontario, and pay a $10 membership fee with personal funds (i.e. no corporation or union funds may be used).

The vote was weighted in such a way as to suppress power of larger groups of Conservative voters. Each of the province's ridings that had more than 100 votes cast were allocated 100 electoral votes; ridings in which fewer than 100 party members vote were not given a weight, but instead had the votes counted as individual votes. The first candidate to get 50 per cent of the votes was declared the new leader. If no one got a majority on first count (or in subsequent rounds), the lowest-ranked candidate were dropped before the next round as ballots were counted, according to instant-runoff voting rules.

Candidates had to be nominated by at least 100 party members, had to agree to abide by the party's existing platform for the next election, and had to be approved by the party's nominations committee as a PC candidate for the 2018 provincial election.

=== Method and Electronic Security ===
The voting method is solely electronic voting with no other access methods. To cast a ballot, a three-part validation-vote was employed. First each eligible member had to register to vote with a code sent via regular mail. Second, each member who had registered had to validate their identity with one piece of government issued identification by uploading an image. Third, each qualifying member was provided a second access code to use during the voting period via the internet. The system was criticized by all candidates as overly complicated and difficult for elderly members and those with difficulties using or accessing computers.

Doug Ford and Tanya Granic Allen raised concerns over the security and legitimacy of the vote. Ford stated he believed "party elites" and "the establishment" would try to steal the election and said "there should be security cameras on the servers". Past leadership candidate Frank Klees said he had grave concerns about the integrity of the vote.

== Timeline ==
- January 24, 2018: Leader Patrick Brown holds an emergency press conference at 9:45 pm to deny allegations of sexual misconduct, 15 minutes before CTV News planned to break a story detailing allegations made by two women. The PC Caucus meets in a telephone conference call and demands Brown's resignation.
- January 25, 2018: Just before 1:30 am, Brown issues a statement announcing his resignation as party leader but maintaining his innocence. Brown states his intention to remain an MPP.
- January 26, 2018:
  - PC caucus unanimously elects Vic Fedeli as interim leader and Fedeli announces he intends to run for the permanent leadership
  - The PC Party executive decides to hold a full-scale leadership election before the next provincial election and sets the date of the leadership election.
- January 28, 2018: Party president Rick Dykstra resigns shortly before Maclean's magazine publishes a story about him allegedly sexually assaulting an employee during his time as a federal MP.
- January 29, 2018: Doug Ford announces he intends to run.
- January 30, 2018: Fedeli withdraws from the contest.
- January 31, 2018: The party's executive decides on the timeline and rules for the leadership election.
- February 1, 2018: Christine Elliott officially declares her candidacy.
- February 3, 2018: Ford officially declares his candidacy.
- February 4, 2018: Caroline Mulroney officially declares her candidacy.
- February 8, 2018: Tanya Granic Allen announces she intends to run.
- February 14, 2018: Granic Allen officially declares her candidacy.
- February 15, 2018: All-candidates televised debate held in Toronto, moderated by Steve Paikin and aired on TVOntario.
- February 16, 2018:
  - Former leader Patrick Brown is expelled from the PC caucus, and then declares his candidacy.
  - Last day of the nomination period (as of 5:00 pm) and to become a member of the party eligible to vote (as of 11:59 pm)
- February 20, 2018: PC Party Provincial Nominations Committee meets to interview Elliott, Ford, Granic Allen and Brown as part of the vetting process. (As the only nominated riding candidate, Mulroney has already been vetted).
- February 21, 2018: Provincial Nominations Committee approves the candidacies of Brown, Elliott, Ford, and Granic Allen in addition to Mulroney, whose candidacy had previously been approved.
- February 23, 2018: Last day for candidates to withdraw their names from the ballot (candidates who withdraw after this date may still appear on the ballot).
- February 26, 2018: Patrick Brown withdraws from leadership race.
- February 28, 2018, 6:30 pm: All-candidates debate held at the Shaw Centre in Ottawa, moderated by Althia Raj of HuffPost Canada.
- March 1, 2018, 1:30–3:00 pm: Debate held in London, Ontario, between Christine Elliott, Doug Ford, and Tanya Granic Allen; moderated by Andrew Lawton of CFPL and broadcast live on Global News Radio stations and over Facebook. Caroline Mulroney declined an invitation to attend the debate.
- March 2–9, 2018: Voting period. Online balloting used. Voting ended at noon on the last day of the voting period. An application for a court injunction to extend the voting period by a week was denied by Ontario Superior Court of Justice judge Todd Archibald
- March 10, 2018: Leadership votes counted and results were scheduled to be announced at a convention in Markham, Ontario at 3 pm. However, results were not made available at that time and at 7:30 pm the party's Chief Electoral Officer announced a review of some ballots was required and the results were not announced until after 10 pm.
- March 11, 2018: Elliott initially issues a statement refusing to concede, citing "serious irregularities with respect to this leadership race" and asserting that "thousands of members have been assigned to incorrect ridings" resulting in electoral points being misallocated. However, Elliott releases a statement later that evening conceding to Ford and pledging her support for him as leader.
- June 7, 2018: Fixed-date of the 2018 Ontario provincial election.

== Debates ==
Debates among candidates for the 2018 Progressive Conservative Party of Ontario leadership election
| No. | Date | Place | Organized by | Moderator | Participants | | | | | |
| P Participant. I Invitee. N Non-invitee. A Absent invitee. O Out of race (exploring or withdrawn). | | | | | Brown | Elliott | Fedeli | Ford | Granic Allen | Mulroney |
|---|---|---|---|---|---|---|---|---|---|---|
| 1 | February 15, 2018 | William G. Davis Studio; Toronto, ON | TVOntario | Steve Paikin | O | P | O | P | P | P |
| 2 | February 28, 2018 | Shaw Centre; Ottawa, ON | Progressive Conservative Party of Ontario | Althia Raj | O | P | O | P | P | P |
| 3 | March 1, 2018 | Global News Radio 980 CFPL; London, ON | Global News | Andrew Lawton | O | P | O | P | P | A |

== Interim leadership ==
Nipissing MPP Vic Fedeli was elected as interim leader by the PC parliamentary caucus in a unanimous vote on January 26, 2018. Caucus had favoured having the interim leader lead the party in the election campaign but the party executive opted to hold a leadership election prior to the general election.

== Candidates ==
=== Christine Elliott ===
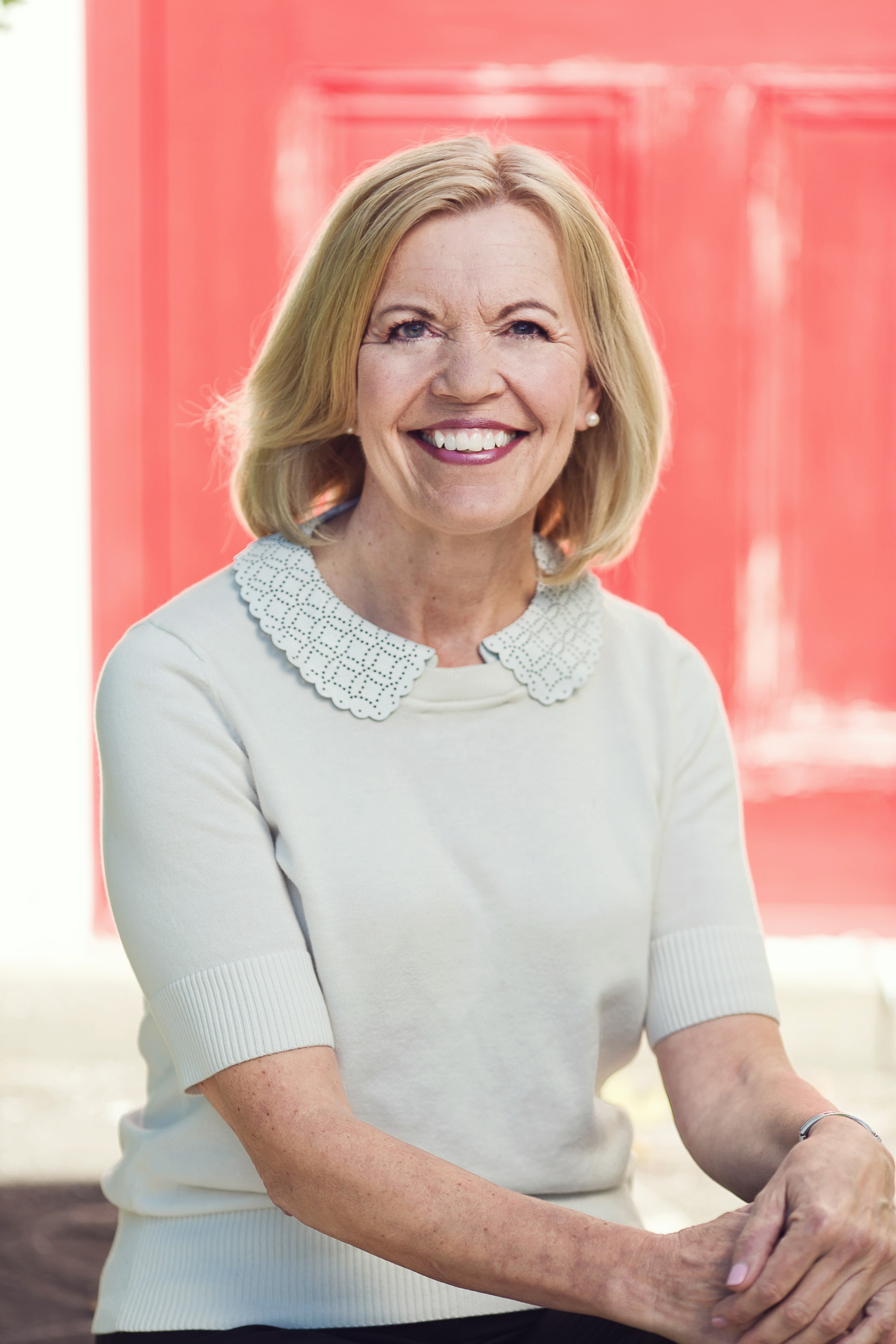
Christine Elliott

Christine Elliott, 63, is the former non-partisan Patient Ombudsman for Ontario (2016–2018), a past PC leadership candidate (2009 and 2015) and former MPP (Whitby—Ajax 2006–07, Whitby—Oshawa 2007–15). She is a lawyer by training, and is the widow of former federal Minister of Finance, and 2002 and 2004 Ontario PC leadership candidate Jim Flaherty. Elliott is also a co-founder and director of the Abilities Centre, a facility for those with special needs.

Elliott opposed a carbon tax, and supported building a high-speed rail line between Toronto to Windsor.

- Date candidacy declared: February 1, 2018
- Date candidacy registered with Elections Ontario: February 7, 2018
- Contributions received: $769,871.00
- Campaign expenditures: $864,683.00

Endorsements

- MPPs: (13) Ted Arnott (Wellington—Halton Hills), Lorne Coe (Whitby—Oshawa), Ernie Hardeman (Oxford), Michael Harris (Kitchener—Conestoga), Randy Hillier (Lanark—Frontenac—Lennox and Addington), Jim McDonell (Stormont—Dundas—South Glengarry), Sam Oosterhoff (Niagara West—Glanbrook), Randy Pettapiece (Perth—Wellington), Ross Romano (Sault Ste. Marie) Laurie Scott (Haliburton—Kawartha Lakes—Brock), Todd Smith (Prince Edward—Hastings), Bill Walker (Bruce—Grey—Owen Sound), Jim Wilson (Simcoe—Grey)
- MPs: (10) Dean Allison (Niagara West—Glanbrook), Michael Chong (Wellington—Halton Hills), Marilyn Gladu (Sarnia—Lambton), Peter Kent (Thornhill), Ben Lobb (Huron—Bruce), John Nater (Perth Wellington), Alex Nuttall (Barrie—Springwater—Oro-Medonte), (Note: previously endorsed Brown) Erin O'Toole (Durham), Scott Reid (Lanark—Frontenac—Kingston), David Sweet (Flamborough—Glanbrook)
- Senators:
- Municipal politicians: (17) Kevin Ashe (Pickering City Councillor for Ward 1; Deputy Mayor of Pickering), Doug Conley (Hamilton City Councillor for Ward 9), Steven Cooke (Clarington Municipal Councillor for Ward 1), Gary Crawford (Toronto City Councillor for Ward 36 Scarborough Southwest), Murray Fearrey (Reeve of Dysart et al), Pat Fortini (Brampton City Councillor for Wards 7 & 8), Angela Kennedy (Toronto Catholic District School Board Trustee for Ward 11), Jeff Knoll (Oakville Town Councillor for Ward 5), Gordon Krantz (Mayor of Milton), Natalia Lishchyna (Oakville Town Councillor for Ward 6), Bart Maves (Niagara Regional Councillor for Niagara Falls), (Note: Also served as MPP for Niagara Falls from 1995 to 2003) Sandy McConkey (Springwater Township councillor for Ward 4), Sue McFadden (Mississauga City Councillor) for Ward 10), Tony Quirk (Niagara Regional Councillor for Grimsby), Karen Ras (Mississauga City Councillor) for Ward 2), Jake Skinner (Thames Valley District School Board Trustee for London Wards 7, 8, 9, 10, and 13), (Note: Also seeking the PC nomination in London West, for the upcoming Provincial election) Ron Starr (Mississauga City Councillor for Ward 6)
- Former MPPs: (5) Dave Boushy (Sarnia, 1995–1999), Dianne Cunningham (London North, 1988-2003), Phil Gillies (Brantford, 1981–1987), Morley Kells (Etobicoke—Lakeshore, 1981–1985 and 1995–2003), Dennis Timbrell (Don Mills, 1971–1987)
- Former MPs: (4) Lois Brown (Newmarket—Aurora, 2008-2015), Costas Menegakis (Richmond Hill, 2011–2015), Joe Oliver (Eglinton—Lawrence, 2011–2015), Pat Perkins (Whitby—Oshawa, 2014–2015) (Note: Also served as Mayor of Whitby, Ontario, from 2006 to 2014)
- Former Senators: (1) Marjory LeBreton (Ontario, 1993–2015)
- Former municipal politicians: (3) Paula Peroni (Sudbury Catholic District School Board Trustee for Zone 5, 1997-2014), John Sanderson (Peel Regional Councillor for Brampton Wards 3 & 4, 2006-2014), John Shea (Ottawa-Carleton District School Board Trustee, 2006-2014)
- Nominated candidates: (30) Deepak Anand (Mississauga—Malton), Roman Baber (York Centre), Peter Bethlenfalvy (Pickering—Uxbridge), Paul Calandra (Markham—Stouffville), (Note: Also served as MP for Oak Ridges—Markham from 2008 to 2015; previously endorsed Mulroney) Bob Chapman (Oshawa), (Note: Also serving as Durham Regional Councillor for Oshawa) Jill Dunlop (Simcoe North), (Note: previously endorsed Brown) Amy Fee (Kitchener South—Hespeler), (Note: Also serving as Waterloo Catholic District School Board Trustee for Kitchener/Wilmot) Goldie Ghamari (Carleton), (Note: previously endorsed Brown) Parm Gill (Milton), (Note: previously endorsed Mulroney) (Note: Also served as MP for Brampton—Springdale from 2011 to 2015) Mary Henein Thorn (Kitchener Centre), Christine Hogarth (Etobicoke—Lakeshore), Karin Howard (Ottawa South), (Note: Also served as Ottawa City Councillor for Mooney's Bay Ward from 1994 to 1999) (Note: previously endorsed Brown) Adam Ibrahim (Windsor West), Logan Kanapathi (Markham—Thornhill), (Note: Also serving as Markham City Councillor for Ward 7) Mohammad Latif (Windsor—Tecumseh), (Note: previously endorsed Brown) Ben Levitt (Hamilton West—Ancaster—Dundas), Chuck McShane (Niagara Falls), Cameron Montgomery (Orléans), Fadi Nemr (Ottawa—Vanier), (Note: previously endorsed Brown) Lindsey Park (Durham), Derek Parks (Thunder Bay-Superior North), Michael Parsa (Aurora—Oak Ridges—Richmond Hill), (Note: previously endorsed Brown) Esther Pauls (Hamilton Mountain), David Piccini (Northumberland—Peterborough South), Jeremy Roberts (Ottawa West–Nepean), Sheref Sabaway (Mississauga—Erin Mills), Amarjot Sandhu (Brampton West), (Note: previously endorsed Brown and Mulroney) Amanda Simard (Glengarry—Prescott—Russell), (Note: Also serving as Russell Township Councillor) Donna Skelly (Flamborough-Glanbrook), (Note: Also serving as Hamilton City Councillor for Ward 7) Dave Smith (Peterborough-Kawartha), Nina Tangri (Mississauga—Streetsville)
- Other prominent individuals:
- Organizations: (1) Trent Campus Conservatives
- Media: (1) Jonathan Kay (The Walrus editor, 2014–2017; National Post columnist)

=== Doug Ford ===
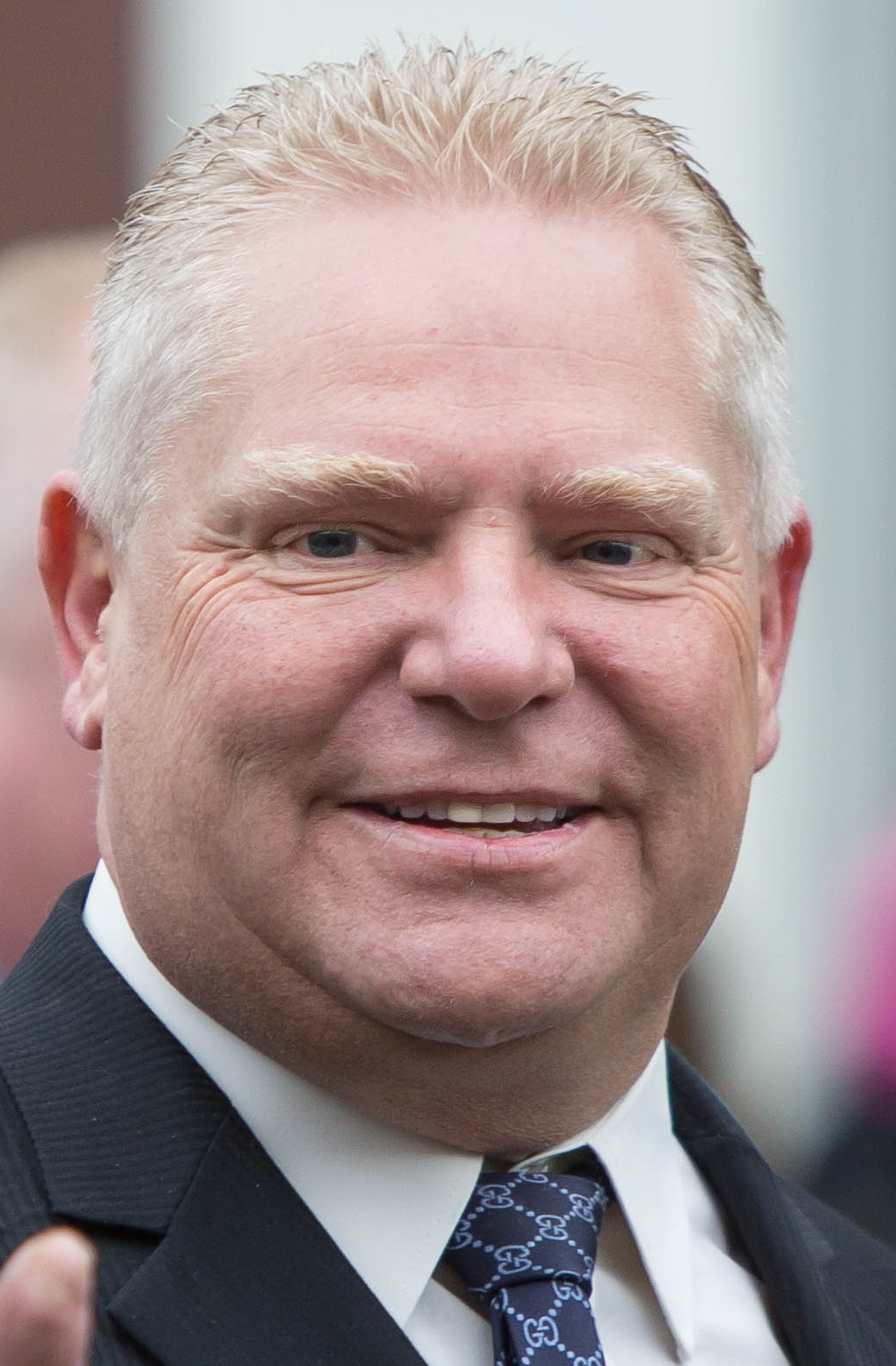
Doug Ford

Doug Ford, 53, is a businessman and politician who is currently seeking the PC nomination in Etobicoke North for the upcoming June 2018 provincial election. Ford is the brother of former Toronto Mayor Rob Ford, and son of former Etobicoke-Humber MPP Doug Ford Sr. He was a member of Toronto City Council during his brother's term as mayor (2010–2014) and the runner-up in the 2014 Toronto mayoral election. Ford announced on February 1, 2018, that he would devote his energy to the leadership race and was no longer intending to run in the 2018 Toronto mayoral election.

Ford promised to "present Ontarians with a compassionate and responsible vision". He wanted to keep taxes low and eliminate a carbon tax. He stated he would not support policies that make Ontario less competitive. He has promised to fund election promises by finding efficiencies in government. Ford is in favour of expanding public transit in the GTA. He promised to revisit the sex-education curriculum.

- Date candidacy announced: January 29, 2018
- Date candidacy declared: February 3, 2018
- Date candidacy registered with Elections Ontario: February 2, 2018
- Contributions received: $848,391.72
- Campaign expenditures: $848,391.72

Endorsements

- MPPs: (2) Toby Barrett (Haldimand—Norfolk), (Note: previously endorsed Brown) Raymond Cho (Scarborough—Rouge River)
- MPs:
- Senators:
- Municipal politicians: (5) Vincent Crisanti (Toronto City Councillor for Ward 1 Etobicoke North), Michael Ford (Toronto City Councillor for Ward 2 Etobicoke North), Billy Pang (York Region District School Board Trustee for Markham), (Note: Also seeking the PC nomination in Markham—Unionville for the upcoming Provincial election) Allan Tam (York Region District School Board Trustee for Markham) Jeremy D Williams (Mayor of Orangeville ),
- Former MPPs: (1) Frank Klees (York—Mackenzie, 1995–1999; Oak Ridges, 1999–2007; Newmarket—Aurora, 2007–2014)
- Former MPs:
- Former Senators:
- Former municipal politicians:
- Nominated candidates: (3) Vincent Ke (Don Valley North), Charity McGrath (Newmarket—Aurora), Michael Tibollo (Vaughan—Woodbridge)
- Other prominent individuals: (2) Charles McVety (president of Canada Christian College), Paul Melnichuk (pastor of the Prayer Palace, Toronto)
- Organizations:
- Media:

=== Tanya Granic Allen ===
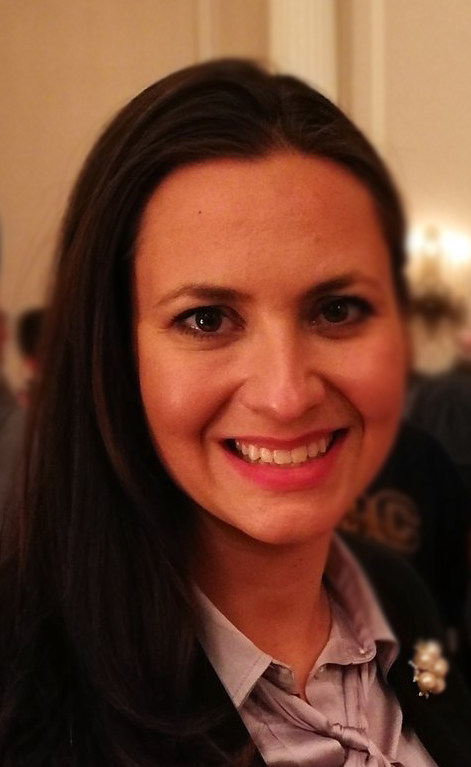
Tanya Granic Allen

Tanya Granic Allen, 37, is a social conservative parental rights activist and the president of Parents As First Educators (PAFE), a group that opposes the province's new sex education curriculum. She also sits on the board of the Catholic Civil Rights League, a conservative Catholic lobby and advocacy group. She previously worked as a political staffer at Toronto City Hall for then Toronto City Councillor John Parker, and as a spokesperson for the Campaign Life Coalition.

Granic Allen opposes abortion and also supported repealing and replacing the Liberal government's new sex education curriculum. She promised to rerun contested riding nominations completed under Patrick Brown.

- Date candidacy announced: February 8, 2018
- Date candidacy declared: February 14, 2018
- Date candidacy registered with Elections Ontario: February 13, 2018
- Date candidacy revoked: May 5, 2018
- Contributions received: $364,768.77
- Campaign expenditures: $334,791.85

Endorsements

- MPPs:
- MPs: (1) Brad Trost (Saskatoon—University, SK)
- Senators:
- Municipal politicians:
- Former MPPs:
- Former MPs:
- Former Senators:
- Former municipal politicians:
- Nominated candidates:
- Other prominent individuals: (1) Paul Fromm (white supremacist and perennial candidate; endorsement rejected by Granic Allen)
- Organizations: (2) Campaign Life Coalition, Catholic Civil Rights League
- Media:

=== Caroline Mulroney ===
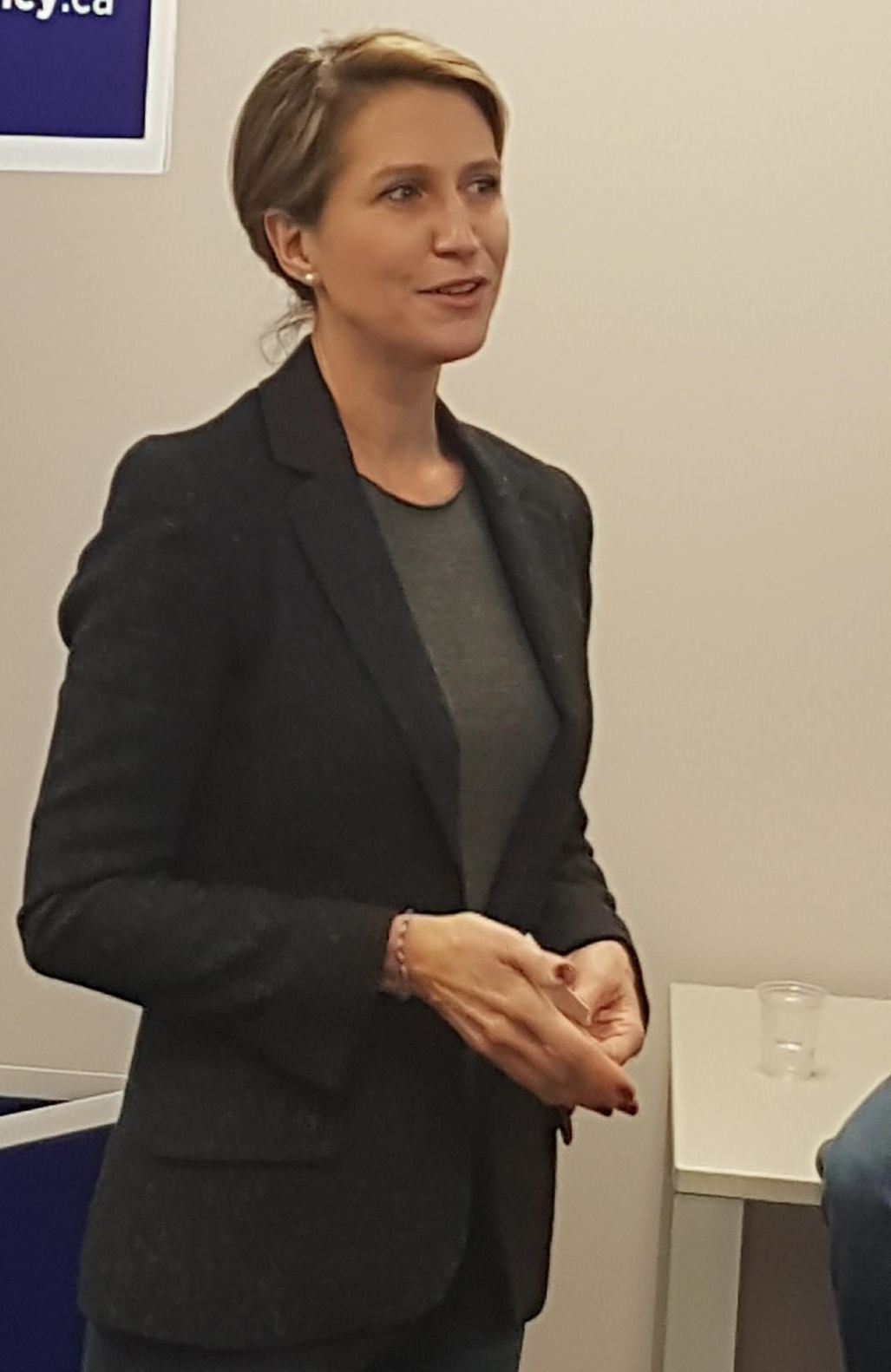
Caroline Mulroney

Caroline Mulroney, 43, is a businesswoman, lawyer and the daughter of former Prime Minister of Canada Brian Mulroney and his wife, Mila. Mulroney is the PC candidate in York—Simcoe for the upcoming election.

Mulroney wanted to use the "People's Guarantee" as a "starting point". She supported childcare rebates as well as cuts to hydro rates. Mulroney had been in favour of a carbon tax, but shifted against one. Mulroney remained committed to spending $1 billion to build Hamilton's light rail transit system. Her platform would have had a small deficit to pay for her promises.

- Date candidacy declared: February 4, 2018
- Date candidacy registered with Elections Ontario: February 5, 2018
- Contributions received: $943,858.00
- Campaign expenditures: $1,068,676.00

Endorsements

- MPPs: (5) Bob Bailey (Sarnia—Lambton), Monte McNaughton (Lambton—Kent—Middlesex), Norm Miller (Parry Sound—Muskoka), John Yakabuski (Renfrew—Nipissing—Pembroke), Jeff Yurek (Elgin—Middlesex—London)
- MPs: (11) Gord Brown (Leeds—Grenville—Thousand Islands and Rideau Lakes), Tony Clement (Parry Sound-Muskoka), (Note: Also served as MPP for Brampton West—Mississauga from 1995 to 2003) Diane Finley (Haldimand—Norfolk), Stephanie Kusie (Calgary Midnapore, AB), Guy Lauzon (Stormont—Dundas—South Glengarry), Phil McColeman (Brantford—Brant), (Note: Previously endorsed Brown) Rob Nicholson (Niagara Falls), Lisa Raitt (Milton), Bruce Stanton (Simcoe North), David Tilson (Dufferin—Caledon), (Note: Also served as MPP for Dufferin—Peel—Wellington—Grey from 1990 to 2002) Peter Van Loan (York—Simcoe) (Note: former president of the PCPO)
- Senators: (2) Nicole Eaton (Ontario), Thanh Hai Ngo (Ontario)
- Municipal politicians: (2) Nancy Deni (Sudbury Catholic District School Board Trustee for Zone 4), Eric Duncan (Mayor of North Dundas)
- Former MPPs: (2) John Snobelen (Mississauga North, 1995-1999; Mississauga West, 1999–2003), David Turnbull (Don Valley West, 1990-2003)
- Former MPs: (6) Bal Gosal (Bramalea—Gore—Malton, 2011–2015), Ted Opitz (Etobicoke Centre, 2011–2015), Peter MacKay (Pictou—Antigonish—Guysborough, NS, 1997–2004; Central Nova, NS, 2004–2015), Brian Mulroney (Central Nova, NS, 1983-1984; Manicouagan, QC, 1984-1988; Charlevoix, QC, 1988–1993; Prime Minister of Canada, 1984–1993), Joe Preston (Elgin—Middlesex—London, 2004-2015), Terence Young (Oakville, 2008–2015) (Note: Also served as MPP for Halton Centre from 1995 to 1999)
- Former Senators: (2) Consiglio Di Nino (Ontario, 1990–2012), Bob Runciman (Ontario, 2010–2017) (Note: Also served as MPP for Leeds—Grenville from 1981 to 2010)
- Former municipal politicians:
- Nominated candidates: (18) Will Bouma (Brant), (Note: Also serving as Brant County councillor for Ward 1) Clifford Bull (Kiiwetinoong), (Note: Also serving as Lac Seul First Nation Band Chief) Stan Cho (Willowdale), Stephen Crawford (Oakville), Merrilee Fullerton (Kanata—Carleton), Jon Kieran (Don Valley West), Daryl Kramp (Hastings—Lennox and Addington), (Note: Also served as MP for Prince Edward—Hastings from 2004 to 2015) Stephen Lecce (King—Vaughan), Jane McKenna (Burlington), (Note: Also served as MPP for Burlington from 2011 to 2014) Denzil Minnan-Wong (Don Valley East), (Note: Also serving as Deputy Mayor of Toronto and City Councillor for Ward 34 (Don Valley East)) Rod Phillips (Ajax), Kaleed Rasheed (Mississauga East—Cooksville), Greg Rickford (Kenora—Rainy River), (Note: Also served as MP for Kenora from 2008 to 2015) André Robichaud (Mushkegowuk—James Bay) Prabmeet Sarkaria (Brampton South), Gillian Smith (University—Rosedale), Effie Triantafilopoulos (Oakville North—Burlington), Susan Truppe (London North Centre) (Note: Also served as MP for London North Centre from 2011 to 2015)
- Other prominent individuals:
- Organizations:
- Media: (1) Conrad Black (Author, National Post columnist)

== Withdrawn candidates ==
=== Patrick Brown ===
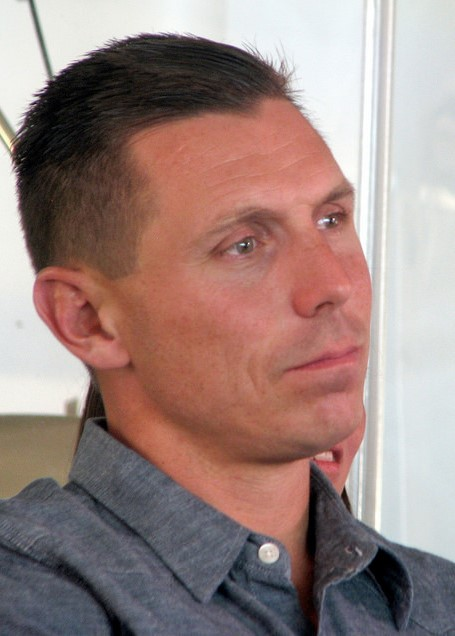
Patrick Brown

Patrick Brown, 48, is the MPP for Simcoe North (2015–2018 as a Progressive Conservative and 2018–present as an independent) and a former Conservative MP for Barrie (2006–2015). He was the leader of the Progressive Conservative Party of Ontario from 2015 until his 2018 resignation triggered this leadership election. Brown was expelled from the PC caucus hours before registering his candidacy on February 16, 2018. On February 21, 2018, the party's nominations committee approved Brown to seek the leadership in a 3 to 2 vote.

Brown planned to run on the full "People's Guarantee" platform, including a carbon tax which would fund the platform, and which had been the intended 2018 election platform prior to Brown's resignation.

Brown withdrew ten days after announcing his candidacy, claiming that he and his family had been subjected to threats for entering the contest. His withdrawal occurred hours after reports surfaced that as leader he had directed top party officials: "get me the result I want", in a riding nomination that has subsequently become the focus of a Hamilton Police Service investigation for alleged fraud and also the same day that the Integrity Commissioner announced an investigation of Brown's travel expenses and other alleged financial improprieties.

- Date candidacy declared: February 16, 2018
- Date candidacy registered with Elections Ontario: February 16, 2018
- Date withdrew: February 26, 2018
- Contributions received: $18,574.00
- Campaign expenditures: $19,326.00

Endorsements

- MPPs:
- MPs:
- Senators:
- Municipal politicians: (1) Shelby Kramp-Neuman (Deputy Mayor of Centre Hastings),
- Former MPPs: (1) Garfield Dunlop (Simcoe North, 1999–2015)
- Former MPs: (1) Brian Storseth (Westlock—St. Paul, AB, 2006–2015)
- Former Senators:
- Former municipal politicians:
- Nominated candidates: (9) Troy Crowder (Sudbury), Rudy Cuzzetto (Mississauga—Lakeshore), Mark DeMontis (York South—Weston), (Note: previously endorsed Ford) Jass Johal (Brampton North), Angely Pacis (Mississauga Centre), Iris Yu (Spadina—Fort York), Eric Weniger (London—Fanshawe), Dionne Duncan (Hamilton Centre), (Note: previously endorsed Mulroney)
- Other prominent individuals: (2) Aaron Hopkins (Ontario PC Regional Vice President, GTA East)
- Organizations:
- Media:

=== Vic Fedeli ===
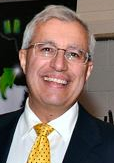
Vic Fedeli

Vic Fedeli, 70, was the Interim Leader (2018), Finance Critic and MPP for Nippissing (2011–present), past leadership candidate (2015) and former mayor of North Bay, Ontario (2003–2010). Fedeli told reporters that he will "let my name stand for leader of our party". After the party executive announced its decision to schedule a leadership election in March, Fedeli reiterated his intention to run for the permanent leadership. On January 30, 2018, however, he announced that he would not be running for the permanent leadership after all in order to focus on his duties as interim leader and correcting organizational problems within the party in the run up to the general election.

- Date candidacy announced: January 26, 2018
- Date withdrew: January 30, 2018

Endorsements

- MPPs:
- MPs:
- Senators:
- Municipal politicians: (4) Mike Anthony (North Bay City Councillor), Mark King (North Bay City Councillor), Al McDonald (Mayor of North Bay), (Note: Also served as MPP for Nipissing from 2002 and 2003) Bill Vrebosch (Mayor of East Ferris)
- Former MPPs: (1) Rod Jackson (Barrie, 2011–2014)
- Former MPs:
- Former Senators:
- Former municipal politicians:
- Nominated candidates:
- Other prominent individuals: (1) Diane Suski (Ontario PC Regional Vice President, Northern Ontario),
- Organizations:
- Media:

== Declined ==
- Stella Ambler, former MP for Mississauga South (2011–2015)
- Peter Bethlenfalvy, former businessman and PC candidate in Pickering—Uxbridge. Endorsed Christine Elliott.
- John Baird, former federal foreign minister and MP (Ottawa West—Nepean 2006–2015) and a former provincial cabinet minister and MPP (Nepean 1995–1999, Nepean—Carleton 1999–2005)
- Steve Clark, Co-Deputy Leader and MPP for Leeds—Grenville (2010–present). Not endorsing any candidate.
- Tony Clement, former federal and provincial cabinet minister, MP for Parry Sound-Muskoka (2006–2019), former MPP for Brampton South (1995–1999) and Brampton West—Mississauga (1999–2003) Endorsed Caroline Mulroney.
- Sylvia Jones, Co-Deputy Leader and MPP for Dufferin—Caledon (2007–present). Not endorsing any candidate.
- Jim Karahalios, corporate lawyer and founder of activist groups "Axe The Carbon Tax" and "Take Back Our PC Party". Was sued by the PC party but the case was dismissed.
- Frank Klees, former provincial minister and MPP (York—Mackenzie 1995–1999, Oak Ridges 1999–2007, Newmarket—Aurora 2007–2014), former leadership candidate (2004 & 2009). Supports Doug Ford.
- Sue-Ann Levy, Toronto Sun columnist and 2009 PC by-election candidate in St. Paul's.
- Lisa MacLeod, Finance Critic, Treasury Board Critic and MPP for Nepean—Carleton (2006–2025) Not endorsing any candidate.
- Monte McNaughton, Critic for Economic Development, Employment & Growth and MPP for Lambton—Kent—Middlesex (2011–2023) Endorsed Caroline Mulroney.
- Alex Nuttall, MP for Barrie—Springwater—Oro-Medonte (2015–2019). Endorsed Patrick Brown then Christine Elliott.
- Kevin O'Leary, Businessman, Reality TV Host, and former candidate for leadership for the Conservative Party of Canada.
- Erin O'Toole, former federal Veterans' Affairs Minister and MP for Durham (2012–2023), former federal Conservative leadership candidate (2017). Endorsed Christine Elliott.
- Jordan Peterson, University of Toronto psychology professor, author, and social commentator.
- Rod Phillips, former president of Postmedia, former head of the Ontario Lottery and Gaming Corporation, former head of CivicAction and current PC candidate in Ajax. Endorsed Caroline Mulroney.
- Lisa Raitt, Deputy Leader of the Conservative Party of Canada (2017–2019), MP for Milton (2008–2019), and former federal cabinet minister. Endorsed Caroline Mulroney.
- Ross Romano, Critic for Northern Ontario Jobs and the Ring of Fire, MPP for Sault Ste. Marie (2017–2025). Endorsed Patrick Brown then Christine Elliot.
- Todd Smith, Energy Critic and MPP for Prince Edward—Hastings (2011–2024). Endorsed Christine Elliott.
- John Tory, Mayor of Toronto (2014–2023), former Ontario PC leader (2004–2009), former Opposition Leader (2005–2007) and former MPP for Dufferin—Peel—Wellington—Grey (2005–2007).

== Opinion polling ==
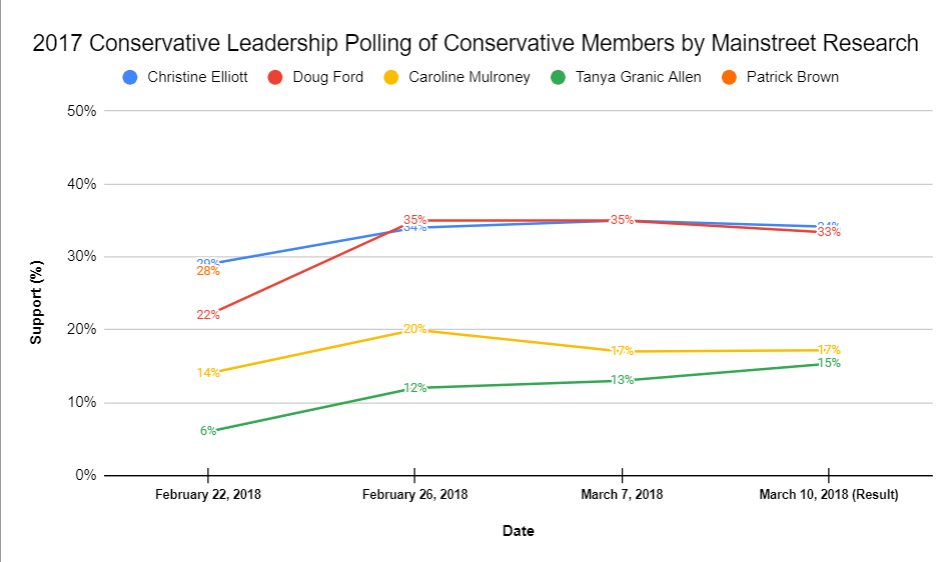
2018 Ontario PC leadership polling of PC members by Mainstreet Research.

=== Progressive Conservative members only ===
| Poll source | Date | 1st | 2nd | 3rd | 4th | 5th |
|---|---|---|---|---|---|---|
| Mainstreet Research; Sample size: 18,308 | March 1 to 7, 2018 | Christine Elliott; 35.2% | Doug Ford; 34.9% | Caroline Mulroney; 17.3% | Tanya Granic Allen; 12.5% | —N/a |
| Mainstreet Research; Sample size: 17,399 | February 21 to 26, 2018 | Doug Ford; 34.8% | Christine Elliott; 33.9% | Caroline Mulroney; 19.6% | Tanya Granic Allen; 11.7% | —N/a |
| Mainstreet Research; Sample size: 4,412-6,096 | February 20 to 22, 2018 | Christine Elliott; 28.85% | Patrick Brown; 28.29% | Doug Ford; 22.24% | Caroline Mulroney; 14.15% | Tanya Granic Allen; 6.46% |

=== Progressive Conservative supporters only ===
| Poll source | Date | 1st | 2nd | 3rd | 4th | 5th | Other |
|---|---|---|---|---|---|---|---|
| Forum Research; Sample size: 315 | January 25, 2018 | Christine Elliott; 17% | Doug Ford; 13% | Caroline Mulroney; 11% | John Tory; 9% | John Baird; 6% | Lisa Raitt 6%, Tony Clement 4%, Lisa MacLeod 4%, Not Sure 29% |

=== All Ontarians ===
| Poll source | Date | 1st | 2nd | 3rd | 4th | 5th | Other |
|---|---|---|---|---|---|---|---|
| Forum Research; Sample size: 949 | February 17, 2018 | Christine Elliott; 22% | Doug Ford; 16% | Caroline Mulroney; 14% | Patrick Brown; 13% | Tanya Granic Allen; 5% | Not Sure 31% |
| Forum Research; Sample size: 751 | January 25, 2018 | Christine Elliott; 12% | Doug Ford; 11% | John Tory; 8% | Caroline Mulroney; 7% | Tony Clement; 6% | Lisa Raitt 6%, John Baird 5%, Lisa MacLeod 4%, Not Sure 41% |

== Results ==
=== By round ===
= Eliminated from next round
= Winner

| Candidate | Ballot 1 | | Ballot 2 | | | | Ballot 3 | | | |
| Name | Votes | Points | Votes | +/- | Points | +/- | Votes | +/- | Points | +/- |
|---|---|---|---|---|---|---|---|---|---|---|
| Doug Ford | 20,363; 31.80% | 4,091; 33.35% | 27,812; 43.77% | 7,449; 11.97% | 5,652; 46.08% | 1,561; 12.73% | 30,041; 48.26% | 2,229; 4.49% | 6,202; 50.62% | 550; 4.54% |
| Christine Elliott | 23,237; 36.28% | 4,187; 34.13% | 24,138; 37.99% | 901; 1.71% | 4,394; 35.82% | 207; 1.69% | 32,202; 51.74% | 8,064; 13.75% | 6,049; 49.38% | 1,655; 13.56% |
| Caroline Mulroney | 11,099; 17.33% | 2,107; 17.18% | 11,595; 18.25% | 496; 0.92% | 2,221; 18.11% | 114; 0.93% | eliminated | | | |
| Tanya Granic Allen | 9,344; 14.596% | 1,882; 15.34% | eliminated | | | | | | | |
| TOTAL | 64,043 | 12,267 | 63,545 | -498 | 12,267 | 0 | 62,243 | -1,302 | 12,251 | -16 |

=== By riding ===
==== Toronto ====
Toronto
| Riding | Ballot 1 | | | | | Ballot 2 | | | | | | | | Ballot 3 | | | | | |
| Caucus/Candidate (Supported) | Granic Allen | Elliott | Ford | Mulroney | Total | Elliot | | Ford | | Mulroney | | Total | | Elliott | | Ford | | Total | |
Toronto & York
| Beaches—East York | 7.40 (37) | 41.20 (206) | 31.40 (157) | 20.00 (100) | 100 (500) | 41.60 (208) | +0.40 (+2) | 38.00 (190) | +6.60 (+33) | 20.40 (102) | +0.40 (+2) | 100 (500) | (0) | 59.96 (292) | +18.36 (+84) | 40.04 (195) | +2.04 (+5) | 100 (487) | (-13) |
| Davenport | 10.90 (23) | 26.54 (56) | 45.02 (95) | 17.54 (37) | 100 (211) | 27.49 (58) | +0.95 (+2) | 54.98 (116) | +9.95 (+21) | 17.54 (37) | +0.00 (+0) | 100 (211) | (0) | 40.29 (83) | +12.80 (+25) | 59.71 (123) | +4.73 (+7) | 100 (206) | (-5) |
| Don Valley East; Candidate: Denzil Minnan-Wong (Mulroney) | 11.23 (42) | 37.97 (142) | 39.84 (149) | 10.96 (41) | 100 (374) | 39.04 (146) | +1.07 (+4) | 49.47 (185) | +9.63 (+36) | 11.50 (43) | +0.53 (+2) | 100 (374) | (0) | 46.47 (171) | +7.43 (+25) | 53.53 (197) | +4.07 (+12) | 100 (368) | (-6) |
| Don Valley West; Candidate: Jon Kieran (Mulroney) | 4.27 (57) | 45.43 (606) | 19.42 (259) | 30.89 (412) | 100 (1334) | 46.58 (620) | +1.16 (+14) | 22.16 (295) | +2.75 (+36) | 31.26 (416) | +0.37 (+4) | 100 (1331) | (-3) | 73.88 (939) | +27.30 (+319) | 26.12 (332) | +3.96 (+37) | 100 (1271) | (-60) |
| Eglinton—Lawrence | 4.53 (40) | 50.79 (449) | 17.99 (159) | 26.70 (236) | 100 (884) | 51.08 (451) | +0.28 (+2) | 21.63 (191) | +3.65 (+32) | 27.29 (241) | +0.60 (+5) | 100 (883) | (-1) | 74.26 (629) | +23.19 (+178) | 25.74 (218) | +4.11 (+27) | 100 (847) | (-36) |
| Parkdale—High Park | 14.31 (75) | 36.64 (192) | 26.15 (137) | 22.90 (120) | 100 (524) | 38.42 (199) | +1.78 (+7) | 38.22 (198) | +12.08 (+61) | 23.36 (121) | +0.46 (+1) | 100 (518) | (-6) | 58.30 (295) | +19.88 (+96) | 41.70 (211) | +3.48 (+13) | 100 (506) | (-12) |
| Spadina—Fort York | 4.66 (24) | 44.85 (231) | 24.27 (125) | 26.21 (135) | 100 (515) | 45.72 (235) | +0.87 (+4) | 27.63 (142) | +3.35 (+17) | 26.65 (137) | +0.44 (+2) | 100 (514) | (-1) | 67.73 (340) | +22.01 (+105) | 32.27 (162) | +4.65 (+20) | 100 (502) | (-12) |
| Toronto Centre | 7.30 (27) | 46.22 (171) | 18.92 (70) | 27.57 (102) | 100 (370) | 47.43 (175) | +1.21 (+4) | 24.39 (90) | +5.47 (+20) | 28.18 (104) | +0.62 (+2) | 100 (369) | (-1) | 72.30 (261) | +24.87 (+86) | 27.70 (100) | +3.31 (+10) | 100 (361) | (-8) |
| Toronto—Danforth | 6.47 (22) | 35.59 (121) | 27.65 (94) | 30.29 (103) | 100 (340) | 36.77 (125) | +1.18 (+4) | 32.65 (111) | +5.00 (+17) | 30.59 (104) | +0.29 (+1) | 100 (340) | (0) | 64.05 (212) | +27.28 (+87) | 35.95 (119) | +3.31 (+8) | 100 (331) | (-9) |
| Toronto—St. Paul's | 5.43 (46) | 43.09 (365) | 13.34 (113) | 38.14 (323) | 100 (847) | 44.48 (375) | +1.39 (+10) | 17.08 (144) | +3.74 (+31) | 38.43 (324) | +0.30 (+1) | 100 (843) | (-4) | 77.47 (605) | +32.98 (+230) | 22.54 (176) | +5.45 (+32) | 100 (781) | (-62) |
| University—Rosedale; Candidate: Gillian Smith (Mulroney) | 3.26 (31) | 43.85 (417) | 11.67 (111) | 41.22 (392) | 100 (951) | 44.95 (427) | +1.10 (+10) | 13.58 (129) | +1.91 (+18) | 41.47 (394) | +0.25 (+2) | 100 (950) | (-1) | 81.42 (732) | +36.48 (+305) | 18.58 (167) | +5.00 (+38) | 100 (899) | (-51) |
North York
| Don Valley North; Candidate: Vincent Ke (Ford) | 13.50 (91) | 20.62 (139) | 57.27 (386) | 8.61 (58) | 100 (674) | 21.34 (143) | +0.72 (+4) | 69.40 (465) | +12.13 (+79) | 9.25 (62) | +0.65 (+4) | 100 (670) | (-4) | 26.43 (176) | +5.08 (+33) | 73.57 (490) | +4.17 (+25) | 100 (666) | (-4) |
| Humber River—Black Creek | 13.21 (21) | 8.81 (14) | 68.55 (109) | 9.43 (15) | 100 (159) | 8.81 (14) | +0.00 (+0) | 81.13 (129) | +12.58 (+20) | 10.06 (16) | +0.63 (+1) | 100 (159) | (0) | 15.72 (25) | +6.92 (+11) | 84.28 (134) | +3.15 (+5) | 100 (159) | (0) |
| Willowdale; Candidate: Stan Cho (Mulroney) | 13.19 (65) | 26.57 (131) | 40.57 (200) | 19.68 (97) | 100 (493) | 28.51 (140) | +1.94 (+9) | 51.53 (253) | +10.96 (+53) | 19.96 (98) | +0.28 (+1) | 100 (491) | (-2) | 44.49 (214) | +15.98 (+74) | 55.51 (267) | +3.98 (+14) | 100 (481) | (-10) |
| York Centre; Candidate: Roman Baber (Elliott) | 7.57 (32) | 38.53 (163) | 39.48 (167) | 14.42 (61) | 100 (423) | 39.67 (167) | +1.13 (+4) | 45.84 (193) | +6.36 (+26) | 14.49 (61) | +0.07 (+0) | 100 (421) | (-2) | 50.85 (209) | +11.19 (+42) | 49.15 (202) | +3.31 (+9) | 100 (411) | (-10) |
| York South—Weston | 11.01 (23) | 22.01 (46) | 63.64 (133) | 3.35 (7) | 100 (209) | 23.67 (49) | +1.66 (+3) | 72.95 (151) | +9.31 (+18) | 3.38 (7) | +0.03 (+0) | 100 (207) | (-2) | 26.70 (55) | +3.03 (+6) | 73.30 (151) | +0.35 (+0) | 100 (206) | (-1) |
Etobicoke
| Etobicoke Centre | 12.25 (118) | 24.82 (239) | 51.51 (496) | 11.42 (110) | 100 (963) | 25.55 (244) | +0.73 (+5) | 62.20 (594) | +10.69 (+98) | 12.25 (117) | +0.83 (+7) | 100 (955) | (-8) | 34.33 (322) | +8.78 (+78) | 65.67 (616) | +3.47 (+22) | 100 (938) | (-17) |
| Etobicoke—Lakeshore; Candidate: Christine Hogarth (Elliott) | 11.83 (97) | 39.51 (324) | 34.27 (281) | 14.39 (118) | 100 (820) | 40.37 (331) | +0.85 (+7) | 44.15 (362) | +9.88 (+81) | 15.49 (127) | +1.10 (+9) | 100 (820) | (0) | 52.96 (430) | +12.59 (+99) | 47.04 (382) | +2.90 (+20) | 100 (812) | (-8) |
| Etobicoke North | 11.68 (55) | 9.34 (44) | 74.95 (353) | 4.03 (19) | 100 (471) | 10.62 (50) | +1.27 (+6) | 84.93 (400) | +9.98 (+47) | 4.46 (21) | +0.43 (+2) | 100 (471) | (0) | 13.59 (64) | +2.97 (+14) | 86.41 (407) | +1.49 (+7) | 100 (471) | (0) |
Scarborough
| Scarborough—Agincourt | 17.16 (64) | 21.45 (80) | 52.82 (197) | 8.58 (32) | 100 (373) | 22.13 (81) | +0.68 (+1) | 68.58 (251) | +15.76 (+54) | 9.29 (34) | +0.71 (+2) | 100 (366) | (-7) | 25.97 (94) | +3.84 (+13) | 74.03 (268) | +5.45 (+17) | 100 (362) | (-4) |
| Scarborough Centre | 14.10 (54) | 31.59 (121) | 44.65 (171) | 9.66 (37) | 100 (383) | 33.78 (127) | +2.18 (+6) | 56.12 (211) | +11.47 (+40) | 10.11 (38) | +0.45 (+1) | 100 (376) | (-7) | 40.27 (149) | +6.49 (+22) | 59.73 (221) | +3.61 (+10) | 100 (370) | (-6) |
| Scarborough—Guildwood | 9.84 (36) | 23.22 (85) | 56.01 (205) | 10.93 (40) | 100 (366) | 24.73 (90) | +1.50 (+5) | 63.74 (232) | +7.72 (+27) | 11.54 (42) | +0.61 (+2) | 100 (364) | (-2) | 32.22 (116) | +7.50 (+26) | 67.78 (244) | +4.04 (+12) | 100 (360) | (-4) |
| Scarborough North | 18.52 (40) | 16.67 (36) | 61.57 (133) | 3.24 (7) | 100 (216) | 16.67 (36) | +0.00 (+0) | 80.09 (173) | +18.52 (+40) | 3.24 (7) | +0.00 (+0) | 100 (216) | (0) | 18.69 (40) | +2.03 (+4) | 81.31 (174) | +1.22 (+1) | 100 (214) | (-2) |
| Scarborough—Rouge; MPP: Raymond Cho (Ford) | 18.27 (80) | 27.40 (120) | 33.33 (146) | 21.01 (92) | 100 (438) | 28.01 (121) | +0.61 (+1) | 49.77 (215) | +16.44 (+69) | 22.22 (96) | +1.22 (+4) | 100 (432) | (-6) | 44.84 (191) | +16.83 (+70) | 55.16 (235) | +5.40 (+20) | 100 (426) | (-6) |
| Scarborough Southwest | 10.45 (35) | 32.24 (108) | 44.48 (149) | 12.84 (43) | 100 (335) | 33.33 (111) | +1.09 (+3) | 52.85 (176) | +8.38 (+27) | 13.81 (46) | +0.98 (+3) | 100 (333) | (-2) | 42.42 (137) | +9.08 (+26) | 57.59 (186) | +4.73 (+10) | 100 (323) | (-10) |

==== 905 ====
905
| Riding | Ballot 1 | | | | | Ballot 2 | | | | | | | | Ballot 3 | | | | | |
| Caucus/Candidate (Supported) | Granic Allen | Elliott | Ford | Mulroney | Total | Elliott | | Ford | | Mulroney | | Total | | Elliott | | Ford | | Total | |
Hamilton-Niagara
| Flamborough—Glanbrook; MP: David Sweet (Elliott); Candidate: Donna Skelly (Elliott) | 24.47 (160) | 33.49 (219) | 31.65 (207) | 10.40 (68) | 100 (654) | 38.46 (250) | +4.98 (+31) | 50.92 (331) | +19.27 (+124) | 10.62 (69) | +0.22 (+1) | 100 (650) | (-4) | 46.02 (295) | +7.56 (+45) | 53.98 (346) | +3.06 (+15) | 100 (641) | (-9) |
| Hamilton Centre | 16.94 (31) | 24.04 (44) | 47.00 (86) | 12.02 (22) | 100 (183) | 26.37 (48) | +2.33 (+4) | 60.44 (110) | +13.45 (+24) | 13.19 (24) | +1.17 (+2) | 100 (182) | (-1) | 34.62 (63) | +8.24 (+15) | 65.39 (119) | +4.95 (+9) | 100 (182) | (0) |
| Hamilton East—Stoney Creek | 15.48 (39) | 28.18 (71) | 44.05 (111) | 12.30 (31) | 100 (252) | 28.92 (72) | +0.74 (+1) | 58.23 (145) | +14.19 (+34) | 12.85 (32) | +0.55 (+1) | 100 (249) | (-3) | 37.35 (93) | +8.43 (+21) | 62.65 (156) | +4.42 (+11) | 100 (249) | (0) |
| Hamilton Mountain; Candidate: Esther Pauls (Elliott) | 17.07 (42) | 26.83 (66) | 46.75 (115) | 9.35 (23) | 100 (246) | 29.63 (72) | +2.80 (+6) | 60.08 (146) | +13.33 (+31) | 10.29 (25) | +0.94 (+2) | 100 (243) | (-3) | 36.93 (89) | +7.30 (+17) | 63.07 (152) | +2.99 (+6) | 100 (241) | (-2) |
| Hamilton West—Ancaster—Dundas; Candidate: Ben Levitt (Elliott) | 14.54 (105) | 43.77 (316) | 27.15 (196) | 14.54 (105) | 100 (722) | 46.05 (332) | +2.28 (+16) | 38.70 (279) | +11.55 (+83) | 15.26 (110) | +0.71 (+5) | 100 (721) | (-1) | 56.90 (404) | +10.85 (+72) | 43.10 (306) | +4.40 (+27) | 100 (710) | (-11) |
| Niagara Centre | 17.07 (85) | 26.51 (132) | 47.39 (236) | 9.04 (45) | 100 (498) | 28.78 (141) | +2.27 (+9) | 61.84 (303) | +14.45 (+67) | 9.39 (46) | +0.35 (+1) | 100 (490) | (-8) | 35.82 (173) | +7.04 (+32) | 64.18 (310) | +2.35 (+7) | 100 (483) | (-7) |
| Niagara Falls; MP: Rob Nicholson (Mulroney); Candidate: Chuck McShane (Elliott) | 10.02 (47) | 38.59 (181) | 31.56 (148) | 19.83 (93) | 100 (469) | 39.49 (184) | +0.89 (+3) | 40.13 (187) | +8.57 (+39) | 20.39 (95) | +0.56 (+2) | 100 (466) | (-3) | 56.62 (261) | +17.13 (+77) | 43.38 (200) | +3.26 (+13) | 100 (461) | (-5) |
| Niagara West; MPP: Sam Oosterhoff (Elliott); MP: Dean Allison (Elliott) | 29.33 (166) | 36.75 (208) | 22.97 (130) | 10.95 (62) | 100 (566) | 43.24 (243) | +6.49 (+35) | 45.55 (256) | +22.58 (+126) | 11.21 (63) | +0.26 (+1) | 100 (562) | (-4) | 52.59 (295) | +9.35 (+52) | 47.42 (266) | +1.86 (+10) | 100 (561) | (-1) |
| St. Catharines | 18.77 (70) | 30.30 (113) | 30.56 (114) | 20.38 (76) | 100 (373) | 32.88 (120) | +2.58 (+7) | 45.21 (165) | +14.64 (+51) | 21.92 (80) | +1.54 (+4) | 100 (365) | (-8) | 49.16 (175) | +16.28 (+55) | 50.84 (181) | +5.64 (+16) | 100 (356) | (-9) |
Peel-Halton
| Brampton Centre | 17.11 (39) | 36.40 (83) | 39.47 (90) | 7.02 (16) | 100 (228) | 37.28 (85) | +0.88 (+2) | 55.70 (127) | +16.23 (+37) | 7.02 (16) | +0.00 (+0) | 100 (228) | (0) | 42.48 (96) | +5.20 (+11) | 57.52 (130) | +1.82 (+3) | 100 (226) | (-2) |
| Brampton East | 3.44 (20) | 47.50 (276) | 32.53 (189) | 16.52 (96) | 100 (581) | 47.93 (278) | +0.43 (+2) | 35.52 (206) | +2.99 (+17) | 16.55 (96) | +0.03 (+0) | 100 (580) | (-1) | 58.47 (328) | +10.54 (+50) | 41.53 (233) | +6.02 (+27) | 100 (561) | (-19) |
| Brampton North | 12.33 (37) | 33.33 (100) | 40.67 (122) | 13.67 (41) | 100 (300) | 34.34 (102) | +1.01 (+2) | 50.51 (150) | +9.84 (+28) | 15.15 (45) | +1.49 (+4) | 100 (297) | (-3) | 44.41 (131) | +10.06 (+29) | 55.59 (164) | +5.09 (+14) | 100 (295) | (-2) |
| Brampton South; Candidate: Prabmeet Sarkaria (Mulroney) | 9.68 (36) | 26.88 (100) | 30.65 (114) | 32.80 (122) | 100 (372) | 28.03 (104) | +1.15 (+4) | 38.81 (144) | +8.17 (+30) | 33.15 (123) | +0.36 (+1) | 100 (371) | (-1) | 59.08 (218) | +31.05 (+114) | 40.92 (151) | +2.11 (+7) | 100 (369) | (-2) |
| Brampton West; Candidate: Amarjot Sandhu (Elliott) | 8.62 (28) | 52.62 (171) | 32.31 (105) | 6.46 (21) | 100 (325) | 53.56 (173) | +0.95 (+2) | 39.94 (129) | +7.63 (+24) | 6.50 (21) | +0.04 (+0) | 100 (323) | (-2) | 56.83 (183) | +3.27 (+10) | 43.17 (139) | +3.23 (+10) | 100 (322) | (-1) |
| Mississauga Centre | 17.58 (64) | 28.02 (102) | 46.15 (168) | 8.24 (30) | 100 (364) | 30.00 (108) | +1.98 (+6) | 60.28 (217) | +14.12 (+49) | 9.72 (35) | +1.48 (+5) | 100 (360) | (-4) | 36.31 (130) | +6.31 (+22) | 63.69 (228) | +3.41 (+11) | 100 (358) | (-2) |
| Mississauga East—Cooksville; Candidate: Kaleed Rasheed (Mulroney) | 22.54 (87) | 15.29 (59) | 49.74 (192) | 12.44 (48) | 100 (386) | 16.98 (64) | +1.69 (+5) | 69.50 (262) | +19.76 (+70) | 13.53 (51) | +1.09 (+3) | 100 (377) | (-9) | 24.66 (91) | +7.69 (+27) | 75.34 (278) | +5.84 (+16) | 100 (369) | (-8) |
| Mississauga—Erindale; Candidate: Sheref Sabaway (Elliott) | 16.45 (87) | 21.55 (114) | 53.88 (285) | 8.13 (43) | 100 (529) | 22.39 (118) | +0.84 (+4) | 67.93 (358) | +14.06 (+73) | 9.68 (51) | +1.55 (+8) | 100 (527) | (-2) | 29.58 (155) | +7.19 (+37) | 70.42 (369) | +2.49 (+11) | 100 (524) | (-3) |
| Mississauga—Lakeshore | 9.11 (78) | 42.29 (362) | 29.79 (255) | 18.81 (161) | 100 (856) | 43.14 (368) | +0.85 (+6) | 37.40 (319) | +7.61 (+64) | 19.46 (166) | +0.65 (+5) | 100 (853) | (-3) | 59.01 (491) | +15.87 (+123) | 40.99 (341) | +3.59 (+22) | 100 (832) | (-21) |
| Mississauga—Malton; Candidate: Deepak Anand (Elliott) | 12.50 (68) | 41.91 (228) | 32.90 (179) | 12.68 (69) | 100 (544) | 42.65 (232) | +0.73 (+4) | 43.75 (238) | +10.85 (+59) | 13.60 (74) | +0.92 (+5) | 100 (544) | (0) | 50.65 (272) | +8.01 (+40) | 49.35 (265) | +5.60 (+27) | 100 (537) | (-7) |
| Mississauga—Streetsville; Candidate: Nina Tangri (Elliott) | 12.72 (58) | 25.22 (115) | 53.07 (242) | 8.99 (41) | 100 (456) | 27.27 (123) | +2.05 (+8) | 63.19 (285) | +10.12 (+43) | 9.53 (43) | +0.54 (+2) | 100 (451) | (-5) | 34.67 (156) | +7.39 (+33) | 65.33 (294) | +2.14 (+9) | 100 (450) | (-1) |
| Burlington; Candidate: Jane McKenna (Mulroney) | 11.30 (75) | 40.06 (266) | 29.97 (199) | 18.68 (124) | 100 (664) | 40.88 (271) | +0.81 (+5) | 39.52 (262) | +9.55 (+63) | 19.61 (130) | +0.93 (+6) | 100 (663) | (-1) | 55.90 (365) | +15.02 (+94) | 44.10 (288) | +4.59 (+26) | 100 (653) | (-10) |
| Milton; MP: Lisa Raitt (Mulroney); Candidate: Parm Gill (Elliott) | 22.24 (115) | 28.43 (147) | 36.56 (189) | 12.77 (66) | 100 (517) | 30.27 (155) | +1.84 (+8) | 56.45 (289) | +19.89 (+100) | 13.28 (68) | +0.52 (+2) | 100 (512) | (-5) | 41.82 (212) | +11.54 (+57) | 58.19 (295) | +1.74 (+6) | 100 (507) | (-5) |
| Oakville; Candidate: Stephen Crawford (Mulroney) | 10.80 (120) | 38.34 (426) | 26.73 (297) | 24.12 (268) | 100 (1111) | 39.87 (441) | +1.53 (+15) | 35.44 (392) | +8.71 (+95) | 24.68 (273) | +0.56 (+5) | 100 (1106) | (-5) | 61.16 (666) | +21.28 (+225) | 38.84 (423) | +3.40 (+31) | 100 (1089) | (-17) |
| Oakville North—Burlington; Candidate: Effie Triantafilopoulos (Mulroney) | 11.63 (97) | 38.01 (317) | 30.58 (255) | 19.78 (165) | 100 (834) | 39.52 (326) | +1.51 (+9) | 40.00 (330) | +9.42 (+75) | 20.49 (169) | +0.70 (+4) | 100 (825) | (-9) | 54.80 (440) | +15.28 (+114) | 45.21 (363) | +5.21 (+33) | 100 (803) | (-22) |
York-Simcoe
| Aurora—Oak Ridges—Richmond Hill; Candidate: Michael Parsa (Elliott) | 16.25 (103) | 19.40 (123) | 55.36 (351) | 8.99 (57) | 100 (634) | 20.19 (128) | +0.79 (+5) | 70.51 (447) | +15.14 (+96) | 9.31 (59) | +0.32 (+2) | 100 (634) | (0) | 26.98 (170) | +6.80 (+42) | 73.02 (460) | +2.51 (+13) | 100 (630) | (-4) |
| King—Vaughan; Candidate: Stephen Lecce (Mulroney) | 10.73 (60) | 22.72 (127) | 46.69 (261) | 19.86 (111) | 100 (559) | 23.56 (131) | +0.84 (+4) | 56.30 (313) | +9.60 (+52) | 20.14 (112) | +0.29 (+1) | 100 (556) | (-3) | 36.85 (199) | +13.29 (+68) | 63.15 (341) | +6.85 (+28) | 100 (540) | (-16) |
| Markham—Stouffville; Candidate: Paul Calandra (Elliott) | 14.09 (92) | 36.29 (237) | 39.82 (260) | 9.80 (64) | 100 (653) | 37.85 (246) | +1.55 (+9) | 52.15 (339) | +12.34 (+79) | 10.00 (65) | +0.20 (+1) | 100 (650) | (-3) | 45.12 (291) | +7.27 (+45) | 54.88 (354) | +2.73 (+15) | 100 (645) | (-5) |
| Markham—Thornhill; Candidate: Logan Kanapathi (Elliott) | 11.67 (35) | 40.67 (122) | 33.67 (101) | 14.00 (42) | 100 (300) | 42.67 (128) | +2.00 (+6) | 43.00 (129) | +9.33 (+28) | 14.33 (43) | +0.33 (+1) | 100 (300) | (0) | 56.04 (167) | +13.37 (+39) | 43.96 (131) | +0.96 (+2) | 100 (298) | (-2) |
| Markham—Unionville | 12.84 (105) | 20.05 (164) | 60.39 (494) | 6.72 (55) | 100 (818) | 20.69 (169) | +0.64 (+5) | 72.46 (592) | +12.07 (+98) | 6.85 (56) | +0.13 (+1) | 100 (817) | (-1) | 24.50 (197) | +3.82 (+28) | 75.50 (607) | +3.04 (+15) | 100 (804) | (-13) |
| Newmarket—Aurora; Candidate: Charity McGrath (Ford) | 10.20 (71) | 33.76 (235) | 43.39 (302) | 12.64 (88) | 100 (696) | 36.28 (250) | +2.52 (+15) | 50.65 (349) | +7.26 (+47) | 13.06 (90) | +0.42 (+2) | 100 (689) | (-7) | 47.52 (326) | +11.24 (+76) | 52.48 (360) | +1.83 (+11) | 100 (686) | (-3) |
| Richmond Hill | 10.71 (51) | 30.25 (144) | 48.95 (233) | 10.08 (48) | 100 (476) | 31.14 (147) | +0.89 (+3) | 58.05 (274) | +9.10 (+41) | 10.81 (51) | +0.72 (+3) | 100 (472) | (-4) | 37.07 (172) | +5.93 (+25) | 62.93 (292) | +4.88 (+18) | 100 (464) | (-8) |
| Thornhill; MPP: Gila Martow (no endorsement); MP: Peter Kent (Elliott) | 11.81 (66) | 37.39 (209) | 35.78 (200) | 15.03 (84) | 100 (559) | 38.17 (213) | +0.78 (+4) | 46.06 (257) | +10.28 (+57) | 15.77 (88) | +0.74 (+4) | 100 (558) | (-1) | 50.45 (278) | +12.28 (+65) | 49.55 (273) | +3.49 (+16) | 100 (551) | (-7) |
| Vaughan—Woodbridge; Candidate: Michael Tibollo (Ford) | 12.54 (37) | 20.34 (60) | 58.98 (174) | 8.14 (24) | 100 (295) | 21.31 (62) | +0.97 (+2) | 70.10 (204) | +11.12 (+30) | 8.59 (25) | +0.46 (+1) | 100 (291) | (-4) | 24.83 (71) | +3.52 (+9) | 75.18 (215) | +5.07 (+11) | 100 (286) | (-5) |
| York—Simcoe; MPP: Julia Munro (no endorsement); MP: Peter Van Loan (Mulroney); Candidate: Caroline Mulroney (Mulroney) | 9.69 (41) | 18.68 (79) | 36.64 (155) | 34.99 (148) | 100 (423) | 19.00 (80) | +0.33 (+1) | 45.61 (192) | +8.96 (+37) | 35.39 (149) | +0.40 (+1) | 100 (421) | (-2) | 44.39 (178) | +25.39 (+98) | 55.61 (223) | +10.01 (+31) | 100 (401) | (-20) |
| Barrie—Innisfil | 9.18 (64) | 32.14 (224) | 42.18 (294) | 16.50 (115) | 100 (697) | 33.00 (229) | +0.86 (+5) | 50.14 (348) | +7.96 (+54) | 16.86 (117) | +0.36 (+2) | 100 (694) | (-3) | 43.61 (297) | +10.62 (+68) | 56.39 (384) | +6.24 (+36) | 100 (681) | (-13) |
| Barrie—Springwater—Oro-Medonte; MP: Alex Nuttall (Elliott) | 8.21 (70) | 46.54 (397) | 31.30 (267) | 13.95 (119) | 100 (853) | 47.93 (405) | +1.39 (+8) | 37.52 (317) | +6.21 (+50) | 14.56 (123) | +0.60 (+4) | 100 (845) | (-8) | 58.10 (484) | +10.17 (+79) | 41.90 (349) | +4.38 (+32) | 100 (833) | (-12) |
| Simcoe—Grey; MPP: Jim Wilson (Elliott) | 13.23 (75) | 41.09 (233) | 33.69 (191) | 11.99 (68) | 100 (567) | 42.30 (239) | +1.21 (+6) | 44.07 (249) | +10.39 (+58) | 13.63 (77) | +1.64 (+9) | 100 (565) | (-2) | 52.44 (290) | +10.14 (+51) | 47.56 (263) | +3.49 (+14) | 100 (553) | (-12) |
| Simcoe North; MP: Bruce Stanton (Mulroney); Candidate: Jill Dunlop (Elliott) | 6.91 (46) | 47.90 (319) | 27.18 (181) | 18.02 (120) | 100 (666) | 49.17 (325) | +1.27 (+6) | 32.22 (213) | +5.05 (+32) | 18.61 (123) | +0.59 (+3) | 100 (661) | (-5) | 64.04 (415) | +14.88 (+90) | 35.96 (233) | +3.73 (+20) | 100 (648) | (-13) |
Durham
| Ajax; Candidate: Rod Phillips (Mulroney) | 13.35 (69) | 47.97 (248) | 32.30 (167) | 6.38 (33) | 100 (517) | 50.10 (257) | +2.13 (+9) | 43.28 (222) | +10.97 (+55) | 6.63 (34) | +0.25 (+1) | 100 (513) | (-4) | 55.36 (284) | +5.26 (+27) | 44.64 (229) | +1.36 (+7) | 100 (513) | (0) |
| Durham; MP: Erin O'Toole (Elliott); Candidate: Lindsey Park (Elliott) | 9.87 (117) | 57.22 (678) | 26.84 (318) | 6.08 (72) | 100 (1185) | 58.02 (687) | +0.81 (+9) | 35.05 (415) | +8.22 (+97) | 6.93 (82) | +0.85 (+10) | 100 (1184) | (-1) | 63.34 (748) | +5.31 (+61) | 36.66 (433) | +1.61 (+18) | 100 (1181) | (-3) |
| Oshawa; Candidate: Bob Chapman (Elliott) | 11.01 (69) | 59.17 (371) | 24.56 (154) | 5.26 (33) | 100 (627) | 60.87 (378) | +1.70 (+7) | 33.66 (209) | +9.09 (+55) | 5.48 (34) | +0.21 (+1) | 100 (621) | (-6) | 64.78 (401) | +3.91 (+23) | 35.22 (218) | +1.56 (+9) | 100 (619) | (-2) |
| Pickering—Uxbridge; Candidate: Peter Bethlenfalvy (Elliott) | 12.11 (69) | 43.68 (249) | 31.93 (182) | 12.28 (70) | 100 (570) | 44.62 (253) | +0.94 (+4) | 42.33 (240) | +10.40 (+58) | 13.05 (74) | +0.77 (+4) | 100 (567) | (-3) | 54.69 (303) | +10.07 (+50) | 45.31 (251) | +2.98 (+11) | 100 (554) | (-13) |
| Whitby; MPP: Lorne Coe (Elliott) | 6.22 (68) | 74.95 (820) | 15.08 (165) | 3.75 (41) | 100 (1094) | 76.40 (832) | +1.45 (+12) | 19.56 (213) | +4.48 (+48) | 4.04 (44) | +0.29 (+3) | 100 (1089) | (-5) | 79.15 (858) | +2.75 (+26) | 20.85 (226) | +1.29 (+13) | 100 (1084) | (-5) |

==== Eastern Ontario ====
Eastern Ontario
| Riding | Ballot 1 | | | | | Ballot 2 | | | | | | | | Ballot 3 | | | | | |
| Caucus/Candidate (Supported) | Granic Allen | Elliott | Ford | Mulroney | Total | Elliott | | Ford | | Mulroney | | Total | | Elliott | | Ford | | Total | |
National Capital Region
| Carleton; MP: Pierre Poilievre (no endorsement); Candidate: Goldie Ghamari (Elliott) | 18.00 (187) | 27.72 (288) | 26.47 (275) | 27.82 (289) | 100 (1039) | 29.14 (301) | +1.42 (+13) | 41.34 (427) | +14.87 (+152) | 29.53 (305) | +1.71 (+16) | 100 (1033) | (-6) | 50.64 (511) | +21.51 (+210) | 49.36 (498) | +8.02 (+71) | 100 (1009) | (-24) |
| Kanata—Carleton; Candidate: Merrilee Fullerton (Mulroney) | 15.14 (139) | 30.17 (277) | 22.88 (210) | 31.81 (292) | 100 (918) | 31.93 (288) | +1.76 (+11) | 35.03 (316) | +12.16 (+106) | 33.04 (298) | +1.23 (+6) | 100 (902) | (-16) | 56.57 (495) | +24.64 (+207) | 43.43 (380) | +8.40 (+64) | 100 (875) | (-27) |
| Nepean; MPP: Lisa MacLeod (no endorsement) | 13.84 (84) | 31.63 (192) | 26.03 (158) | 28.50 (173) | 100 (607) | 33.39 (202) | +1.76 (+10) | 37.36 (226) | +11.33 (+68) | 29.26 (177) | +0.75 (+4) | 100 (605) | (-2) | 52.72 (310) | +19.33 (+108) | 47.28 (278) | +9.92 (+52) | 100 (588) | (-17) |
| Orléans; Candidate: Cameron Montgomery (Elliott) | 28.30 (161) | 29.70 (169) | 23.37 (133) | 18.63 (106) | 100 (569) | 32.80 (186) | +3.10 (+17) | 46.91 (266) | +23.54 (+133) | 20.28 (115) | +1.65 (+9) | 100 (567) | (-2) | 47.85 (267) | +15.05 (+81) | 52.15 (291) | +5.24 (+25) | 100 (558) | (-9) |
| Ottawa Centre | 15.44 (88) | 35.97 (205) | 19.30 (110) | 29.30 (167) | 100 (570) | 37.74 (214) | +1.78 (+9) | 31.92 (181) | +12.62 (+71) | 30.34 (172) | +1.04 (+5) | 100 (567) | (-3) | 62.03 (343) | +24.28 (+129) | 37.98 (210) | +6.05 (+29) | 100 (553) | (-14) |
| Ottawa South; Candidate: Karin Howard (Elliott) | 21.18 (115) | 35.91 (195) | 19.71 (107) | 23.20 (126) | 100 (543) | 39.96 (213) | +4.05 (+18) | 36.21 (193) | +16.51 (+86) | 23.83 (127) | +0.62 (+1) | 100 (533) | (-10) | 54.63 (283) | +14.67 (+70) | 45.37 (235) | +9.16 (+42) | 100 (518) | (-15) |
| Ottawa—Vanier; Candidate: Fadi Nemr (Elliott) | 20.00 (66) | 34.55 (114) | 20.61 (68) | 24.85 (82) | 100 (330) | 38.60 (127) | +4.06 (+13) | 34.04 (112) | +13.44 (+44) | 27.36 (90) | +2.51 (+8) | 100 (329) | (-1) | 58.31 (186) | +19.71 (+59) | 41.69 (133) | +7.65 (+21) | 100 (319) | (-10) |
| Ottawa West—Nepean; Candidate: Jeremy Roberts (Elliott) | 17.10 (118) | 36.67 (253) | 22.75 (157) | 23.48 (162) | 100 (690) | 40.26 (277) | +3.60 (+24) | 34.01 (234) | +11.26 (+77) | 25.73 (177) | +2.25 (+15) | 100 (688) | (-2) | 58.81 (394) | +18.54 (+117) | 41.19 (276) | +7.18 (+42) | 100 (670) | (-18) |
Eastern Ontario
| Bay of Quinte; MPP: Todd Smith (Elliott) | 11.76 (91) | 56.85 (440) | 22.35 (173) | 9.04 (70) | 100 (774) | 57.76 (443) | +0.91 (+3) | 32.86 (252) | +10.50 (+79) | 9.39 (72) | +0.34 (+2) | 100 (767) | (-7) | 64.48 (492) | +6.73 (+49) | 35.52 (271) | +2.66 (+19) | 100 (763) | (-4) |
| Glengarry—Prescott—Russell; Candidate: Amanda Simard (Elliott) | 22.56 (90) | 30.58 (122) | 26.57 (106) | 20.30 (81) | 100 (399) | 33.00 (130) | +2.42 (+8) | 44.16 (174) | +17.60 (+68) | 22.84 (90) | +2.54 (+9) | 100 (394) | (-5) | 50.52 (195) | +17.52 (+65) | 49.48 (191) | +5.32 (+17) | 100 (386) | (-8) |
| Haliburton—Kawartha Lakes—Brock; MPP: Laurie Scott (Elliott) | 11.53 (102) | 41.02 (363) | 34.12 (302) | 13.33 (118) | 100 (885) | 42.17 (369) | +1.15 (+6) | 43.89 (384) | +9.76 (+82) | 13.94 (122) | +0.61 (+4) | 100 (875) | (-10) | 52.36 (455) | +10.19 (+86) | 47.64 (414) | +3.76 (+30) | 100 (869) | (-6) |
| Hastings—Lennox and Addington; Candidate: Daryl Kramp (Mulroney) | 14.81 (73) | 41.18 (203) | 28.60 (141) | 15.42 (76) | 100 (493) | 43.39 (210) | +2.21 (+7) | 39.88 (193) | +11.28 (+52) | 16.74 (81) | +1.32 (+5) | 100 (484) | (-9) | 57.02 (272) | +13.64 (+62) | 42.98 (205) | +3.10 (+12) | 100 (477) | (-7) |
| Kingston and the Islands | 19.14 (85) | 41.89 (186) | 15.32 (68) | 23.65 (105) | 100 (444) | 44.50 (194) | +2.60 (+8) | 29.82 (130) | +14.50 (+62) | 25.69 (112) | +2.04 (+7) | 100 (436) | (-8) | 67.29 (286) | +22.80 (+92) | 32.71 (139) | +2.89 (+9) | 100 (425) | (-11) |
| Lanark—Frontenac—Kingston; MPP: Randy Hillier (Elliott); MP: Scott Reid (Elliott) | 16.52 (77) | 41.20 (192) | 20.60 (96) | 21.67 (101) | 100 (466) | 43.72 (202) | +2.52 (+10) | 33.12 (153) | +12.52 (+57) | 23.16 (107) | +1.49 (+6) | 100 (462) | (-4) | 60.63 (271) | +16.90 (+69) | 39.37 (176) | +6.26 (+23) | 100 (447) | (-15) |
| Leeds—Grenville—Thousand Islands and Rideau Lakes; MPP: Steve Clark (no endorsement); MP: Gord Brown (Mulroney) | 11.73 (53) | 26.33 (119) | 31.20 (141) | 30.75 (139) | 100 (452) | 27.29 (122) | +0.97 (+3) | 41.39 (185) | +10.19 (+44) | 31.32 (140) | +0.57 (+1) | 100 (447) | (-5) | 48.35 (205) | +21.06 (+83) | 51.65 (219) | +10.26 (+34) | 100 (424) | (-23) |
| Northumberland—Peterborough South; Candidate: David Piccini (Elliott) | 8.57 (58) | 55.69 (377) | 28.21 (191) | 7.53 (51) | 100 (677) | 56.63 (380) | +0.95 (+3) | 35.02 (235) | +6.81 (+44) | 8.35 (56) | +0.81 (+5) | 100 (671) | (-6) | 61.39 (407) | +4.76 (+27) | 38.61 (256) | +3.59 (+21) | 100 (663) | (-8) |
| Peterborough—Kawartha; Candidate: Dave Smith (Elliott) | 14.62 (75) | 48.54 (249) | 25.34 (130) | 11.50 (59) | 100 (513) | 49.80 (253) | +1.27 (+4) | 38.58 (196) | +13.24 (+66) | 11.61 (59) | +0.11 (+0) | 100 (508) | (-5) | 59.16 (297) | +9.36 (+44) | 40.84 (205) | +2.25 (+9) | 100 (502) | (-6) |
| Stormont—Dundas—South Glengarry; MPP: Jim McDonell (Elliott); MP: Guy Lauzon (Mulroney) | 11.24 (39) | 40.63 (141) | 29.40 (102) | 18.73 (65) | 100 (347) | 42.11 (144) | +1.47 (+3) | 37.43 (128) | +8.03 (+26) | 20.47 (70) | +1.74 (+5) | 100 (342) | (-5) | 57.70 (191) | +15.60 (+47) | 42.30 (140) | +4.87 (+12) | 100 (331) | (-11) |

==== Southwestern Ontario ====
Southwestern Ontario
| Riding | Ballot 1 | | | | | Ballot 2 | | | | | | | | Ballot 3 | | | | | |
| Caucus/Candidate (Supported) | Granic Allen | Elliott | Ford | Mulroney | Total | Elliott | | Ford | | Mulroney | | Total | | Elliott | | Ford | | Total | |
Kitchener-Waterloo
| Cambridge | 21.82 (139) | 42.86 (273) | 23.08 (147) | 12.25 (78) | 100 (637) | 47.06 (296) | +4.20 (+23) | 39.43 (248) | +16.35 (+101) | 13.51 (85) | +1.27 (+7) | 100 (629) | (-8) | 57.79 (360) | +10.73 (+64) | 42.22 (263) | +2.79 (+15) | 100 (623) | (-6) |
| Guelph | 16.27 (68) | 38.52 (161) | 27.03 (113) | 18.18 (76) | 100 (418) | 39.52 (164) | +1.00 (+3) | 40.72 (169) | +13.69 (+56) | 19.76 (82) | +1.58 (+6) | 100 (415) | (-3) | 54.59 (220) | +15.07 (+56) | 45.41 (183) | +4.69 (+14) | 100 (403) | (-12) |
| Kitchener Centre; Candidate: Mary Henein Thorn (Elliott) | 30.80 (146) | 36.92 (175) | 20.46 (97) | 11.81 (56) | 100 (474) | 39.61 (183) | +2.69 (+8) | 46.97 (217) | +26.51 (+120) | 13.42 (62) | +1.61 (+6) | 100 (462) | (-12) | 49.78 (227) | +10.17 (+44) | 50.22 (229) | +3.25 (+12) | 100 (456) | (-6) |
| Kitchener—Conestoga; MPP: Michael Harris (Elliott) | 26.50 (141) | 36.28 (193) | 25.38 (135) | 11.84 (63) | 100 (532) | 39.54 (208) | +3.27 (+15) | 47.34 (249) | +21.96 (+114) | 13.12 (69) | +1.28 (+6) | 100 (526) | (-6) | 50.10 (259) | +10.55 (+51) | 49.90 (258) | +2.57 (+9) | 100 (517) | (-9) |
| Kitchener South—Hespeler; Candidate: Amy Fee (Elliott) | 16.97 (74) | 40.37 (176) | 30.96 (135) | 11.70 (51) | 100 (436) | 41.16 (177) | +0.80 (+1) | 45.81 (197) | +14.85 (+62) | 13.02 (56) | +1.33 (+5) | 100 (430) | (-6) | 49.53 (212) | +8.37 (+35) | 50.47 (216) | +4.65 (+19) | 100 (428) | (-2) |
| Waterloo | 20.32 (128) | 32.06 (202) | 27.46 (173) | 20.16 (127) | 100 (630) | 34.78 (216) | +2.72 (+14) | 43.96 (273) | +16.50 (+100) | 21.26 (132) | +1.10 (+5) | 100 (621) | (-9) | 51.90 (314) | +17.12 (+98) | 48.10 (291) | +4.14 (+18) | 100 (605) | (-16) |
| Wellington—Halton Hills; MPP: Ted Arnott (Elliott); MP: Michael Chong (Elliott) | 22.36 (93) | 35.10 (146) | 28.61 (119) | 13.94 (58) | 100 (416) | 37.07 (152) | +1.98 (+6) | 48.54 (199) | +19.93 (+80) | 14.39 (59) | +0.45 (+1) | 100 (410) | (-6) | 48.14 (194) | +11.07 (+42) | 51.86 (209) | +3.32 (+10) | 100 (403) | (-7) |
London
| Elgin—Middlesex—London; MPP: Jeff Yurek (Mulroney) | 21.84 (154) | 29.50 (208) | 26.53 (187) | 22.13 (156) | 100 (705) | 31.24 (219) | +1.74 (+11) | 44.22 (310) | +17.70 (+123) | 24.54 (172) | +2.41 (+16) | 100 (701) | (-4) | 49.11 (330) | +17.87 (+111) | 50.89 (342) | +6.67 (+32) | 100 (672) | (-29) |
| London—Fanshawe | 24.90 (64) | 31.13 (80) | 34.24 (88) | 9.73 (25) | 100 (257) | 34.39 (87) | +3.26 (+7) | 54.55 (138) | +20.30 (+50) | 11.07 (28) | +1.34 (+3) | 100 (253) | (-4) | 40.16 (100) | +5.77 (+13) | 59.84 (149) | +5.29 (+11) | 100 (249) | (-4) |
| London North Centre; Candidate: Susan Truppe (Mulroney) | 14.63 (98) | 40.45 (271) | 22.69 (152) | 22.24 (149) | 100 (670) | 42.60 (282) | +2.15 (+11) | 34.14 (226) | +11.45 (+74) | 23.26 (154) | +1.02 (+5) | 100 (662) | (-8) | 60.41 (383) | +17.81 (+101) | 39.59 (251) | +5.45 (+25) | 100 (634) | (-28) |
| London West | 16.44 (111) | 43.56 (294) | 19.56 (132) | 20.44 (138) | 100 (675) | 46.48 (310) | +2.92 (+16) | 31.63 (211) | +12.08 (+79) | 21.89 (146) | +1.45 (+8) | 100 (667) | (-8) | 61.80 (406) | +15.32 (+96) | 38.20 (251) | +6.57 (+40) | 100 (657) | (-10) |
Windsor-Essex
| Chatham—Kent—Leamington; MPP: Rick Nicholls (no endorsement) | 23.08 (108) | 30.34 (142) | 29.49 (138) | 17.09 (80) | 100 (468) | 33.33 (152) | +2.99 (+10) | 48.03 (219) | +18.54 (+81) | 18.64 (85) | +1.55 (+5) | 100 (456) | (-12) | 46.53 (208) | +13.20 (+56) | 53.47 (239) | +5.44 (+20) | 100 (447) | (-9) |
| Essex | 32.71 (123) | 26.06 (98) | 23.94 (90) | 17.29 (65) | 100 (376) | 27.87 (102) | +1.81 (+4) | 51.91 (190) | +27.98 (+100) | 20.22 (74) | +2.93 (+9) | 100 (366) | (-10) | 42.14 (150) | +14.27 (+48) | 57.87 (206) | +5.95 (+16) | 100 (356) | (-10) |
| Windsor—Tecumseh; Candidate: Mohammad Latif (Elliott) | 31.68 (64) | 27.23 (55) | 27.23 (55) | 13.86 (28) | 100 (202) | 28.06 (55) | +0.83 (+0) | 56.63 (111) | +29.41 (+56) | 15.31 (30) | +1.45 (+2) | 100 (196) | (-6) | 39.27 (75) | +11.21 (+20) | 60.73 (116) | +4.10 (+5) | 100 (191) | (-5) |
| Windsor West; Candidate: Adam Ibrahim (Elliott) | 24.06 (45) | 20.32 (38) | 26.74 (50) | 28.88 (54) | 100 (187) | 22.28 (41) | +1.96 (+3) | 46.74 (86) | +20.00 (+36) | 30.98 (57) | +2.10 (+3) | 100 (184) | (-3) | 41.46 (68) | +19.18 (+27) | 58.54 (96) | +11.80 (+10) | 100 (164) | (-20) |
Rural
| Brantford—Brant; MP: Phil McColeman (Mulroney); Candidate: Will Bouma (Mulroney) | 23.85 (176) | 28.18 (208) | 32.66 (241) | 15.31 (113) | 100 (738) | 32.01 (234) | +3.83 (+26) | 50.75 (371) | +18.10 (+130) | 17.24 (126) | +1.93 (+13) | 100 (731) | (-7) | 43.91 (317) | +11.90 (+83) | 56.09 (405) | +5.34 (+34) | 100 (722) | (-9) |
| Bruce—Grey—Owen Sound; MPP: Bill Walker (Elliott) | 19.55 (166) | 40.17 (341) | 22.85 (194) | 17.43 (148) | 100 (849) | 41.86 (352) | +1.69 (+11) | 39.00 (328) | +16.15 (+134) | 19.14 (161) | +1.71 (+13) | 100 (841) | (-8) | 56.04 (459) | +14.19 (+107) | 43.96 (360) | +4.96 (+32) | 100 (819) | (-22) |
| Dufferin—Caledon; MPP: Sylvia Jones (no endorsement); MP: David Tilson (Mulroney) | 13.42 (132) | 32.93 (324) | 37.70 (371) | 15.96 (157) | 100 (984) | 33.98 (333) | +1.05 (+9) | 49.18 (482) | +11.48 (+111) | 16.84 (165) | +0.88 (+8) | 100 (980) | (-4) | 46.64 (451) | +12.66 (+118) | 53.36 (516) | +4.18 (+34) | 100 (967) | (-13) |
| Haldimand—Norfolk; MPP: Toby Barrett (Ford); MP: Diane Finley (Mulroney) | 24.44 (120) | 25.66 (126) | 39.72 (195) | 10.18 (50) | 100 (491) | 29.10 (142) | +3.44 (+16) | 59.02 (288) | +19.30 (+93) | 11.89 (58) | +1.70 (+8) | 100 (488) | (-3) | 38.33 (184) | +9.24 (+42) | 61.67 (296) | +2.65 (+8) | 100 (480) | (-8) |
| Huron—Bruce; MPP: Lisa Thompson (no endorsement); MP: Ben Lobb (Elliott) | 24.47 (138) | 37.59 (212) | 21.63 (122) | 16.31 (92) | 100 (564) | 41.11 (229) | +3.52 (+17) | 40.40 (225) | +18.76 (+103) | 18.49 (103) | +2.18 (+11) | 100 (557) | (-7) | 54.44 (294) | +13.33 (+65) | 45.56 (246) | +5.16 (+21) | 100 (540) | (-17) |
| Lambton—Kent—Middlesex; MPP: Monte McNaughton (Mulroney) | 20.31 (92) | 23.84 (108) | 26.49 (120) | 29.36 (133) | 100 (453) | 27.07 (121) | +3.23 (+13) | 40.94 (183) | +14.45 (+63) | 31.99 (143) | +2.63 (+10) | 100 (447) | (-6) | 46.95 (200) | +19.88 (+79) | 53.05 (226) | +12.11 (+43) | 100 (426) | (-21) |
| Oxford; MPP: Ernie Hardeman (Elliott) | 28.29 (187) | 31.92 (211) | 26.32 (174) | 13.46 (89) | 100 (661) | 35.64 (232) | +3.72 (+21) | 49.00 (319) | +22.68 (+145) | 15.36 (100) | +1.90 (+11) | 100 (651) | (-10) | 46.09 (295) | +10.46 (+63) | 53.91 (345) | +4.90 (+26) | 100 (640) | (-11) |
| Perth—Wellington; MPP: Randy Pettapiece (Elliott); MP: John Nater (Elliott) | 20.71 (111) | 37.13 (199) | 27.05 (145) | 15.11 (81) | 100 (536) | 38.61 (205) | +1.48 (+6) | 45.01 (239) | +17.96 (+94) | 16.38 (87) | +1.27 (+6) | 100 (531) | (-5) | 51.81 (272) | +13.20 (+67) | 48.19 (253) | +3.18 (+14) | 100 (525) | (-6) |
| Sarnia—Lambton; MPP: Bob Bailey (Mulroney); MP: Marilyn Gladu (Elliott) | 24.34 (147) | 27.65 (167) | 28.81 (174) | 19.21 (116) | 100 (604) | 28.45 (169) | +0.80 (+2) | 49.83 (296) | +21.02 (+122) | 21.72 (129) | +2.51 (+13) | 100 (594) | (-10) | 42.91 (245) | +14.46 (+76) | 57.09 (326) | +7.26 (+30) | 100 (571) | (-23) |

==== Northern Ontario ====
Northern Ontario
| Riding | Ballot 1 | | | | | | Ballot 2 | | | | | | | | Ballot 3 | | | | | |
| Caucus/Candidate (Supported) | Granic Allen | Elliott | Ford | Mulroney | Total | h | Elliott | | Ford | | Mulroney | | Total | | Elliott | | Ford | | Total | |
|---|---|---|---|---|---|---|---|---|---|---|---|---|---|---|---|---|---|---|---|---|
| Algoma—Manitoulin | 23.94 (45) | 27.66 (52) | 38.83 (73) | 9.57 (18) | 100 (188) | | 29.41 (55) | +1.75 (+3) | 59.89 (112) | +21.06 (+39) | 10.70 (20) | +1.12 (+2) | 100 (187) | (-1) | 37.63 (70) | +8.22 (+15) | 62.37 (116) | +2.47 (+4) | 100 (186) | (-1) |
| Kenora—Rainy River; Candidate: Greg Rickford (Mulroney) | 15.79 (30) | 22.11 (42) | 22.11 (42) | 40.00 (76) | 100 (190) | | 23.40 (44) | +1.30 (+2) | 35.11 (66) | +13.00 (+24) | 41.49 (78) | +1.49 (+2) | 100 (188) | (-2) | 58.33 (105) | +34.93 (+61) | 41.67 (75) | +6.56 (+9) | 100 (180) | (-8) |
| Nickel Belt | 11.26 (17) | 27.15 (41) | 38.41 (58) | 23.18 (35) | 100 (151) | | 28.48 (43) | +1.33 (+2) | 48.34 (73) | +9.93 (+15) | 23.18 (35) | +0.00 (+0) | 100 (151) | (0) | 45.27 (67) | +16.79 (+24) | 54.73 (81) | +6.39 (+8) | 100 (148) | (-3) |
| Nipissing; MPP: Vic Fedeli (no endorsement) | 16.82 (56) | 48.35 (161) | 19.82 (66) | 15.02 (50) | 100 (333) | | 50.30 (166) | +1.96 (+5) | 33.64 (111) | +13.82 (+45) | 16.06 (53) | +1.05 (+3) | 100 (330) | (-3) | 61.68 (198) | +11.38 (+32) | 38.32 (123) | +4.68 (+12) | 100 (321) | (-9) |
| Parry Sound—Muskoka; MPP: Norm Miller (Mulroney); MP: Tony Clement (Mulroney) | 6.44 (32) | 33.20 (165) | 30.99 (154) | 29.38 (146) | 100 (497) | | 34.00 (169) | +0.81 (+4) | 35.61 (177) | +4.63 (+23) | 30.38 (151) | +1.01 (+5) | 100 (497) | (0) | 59.92 (293) | +25.91 (+124) | 40.08 (196) | +4.47 (+19) | 100 (489) | (-8) |
| Renfrew—Nipissing—Pembroke; MPP: John Yakabuski (Mulroney) | 26.66 (169) | 17.82 (113) | 31.07 (197) | 24.45 (155) | 100 (634) | | 21.05 (132) | +3.23 (+19) | 53.11 (333) | +22.04 (+136) | 25.84 (162) | +1.39 (+7) | 100 (627) | (-7) | 38.29 (229) | +17.24 (+97) | 61.71 (369) | +8.60 (+36) | 100 (598) | (-29) |
| Sault Ste. Marie; MPP: Ross Romano (Elliott) | 23.23 (36) | 41.94 (65) | 23.87 (37) | 10.97 (17) | 100 (155) | | 45.03 (68) | +3.10 (+3) | 43.05 (65) | +19.18 (+28) | 11.92 (18) | +0.95 (+1) | 100 (151) | (-4) | 54.00 (81) | +8.97 (+13) | 46.00 (69) | +2.95 (+4) | 100 (150) | (-1) |
| Sudbury | 13.94 (29) | 33.17 (69) | 37.02 (77) | 15.87 (33) | 100 (208) | | 33.98 (70) | +0.81 (+1) | 49.52 (102) | +12.50 (+25) | 16.51 (34) | +0.64 (+1) | 100 (206) | (-2) | 44.55 (90) | +10.57 (+20) | 55.45 (112) | +5.93 (+10) | 100 (202) | (-4) |
| Thunder Bay—Atikokan | 23.56 (41) | 41.95 (73) | 22.41 (39) | 12.07 (21) | 100 (174) | | 44.51 (77) | +2.56 (+4) | 41.62 (72) | +19.20 (+33) | 13.87 (24) | +1.80 (+3) | 100 (173) | (-1) | 52.91 (91) | +8.40 (+14) | 47.09 (81) | +5.48 (+9) | 100 (172) | (-1) |
| Thunder Bay—Superior North; Candidate: Derek Parks (Elliott) | 14.39 (19) | 28.79 (38) | 33.33 (44) | 23.49 (31) | 100 (132) | | 31.06 (41) | +2.27 (+3) | 44.70 (59) | +11.36 (+15) | 24.24 (32) | +0.76 (+1) | 100 (132) | (0) | 48.82 (62) | +17.76 (+21) | 51.18 (65) | +6.48 (+6) | 100 (127) | (-5) |
| Timiskaming—Cochrane | 25.87 (37) | 24.48 (35) | 36.36 (52) | 13.29 (19) | 100 (143) | | 25.35 (36) | +0.88 (+1) | 60.56 (86) | +24.20 (+34) | 14.09 (20) | +0.80 (+1) | 100 (142) | (-1) | 35.97 (50) | +10.62 (+14) | 64.03 (89) | +3.47 (+3) | 100 (139) | (-3) |
| Timmins | 4.00 (4) | 25.00 (25) | 21.00 (21) | 28.00 (28) | 78 (78) | | 25.00 (25) | +0.00 (+0) | 25.00 (25) | +4.00 (+4) | 28.00 (28) | +0.00 (+0) | 78 (78) | (0) | 49.00 (49) | +24.00 (+24) | 28.00 (28) | +3.00 (+3) | 77 (77) | (-1) |
| Kiiwetinoong; Candidate: Clifford Bull (Mulroney) | 3.00 (3) | 3.00 (3) | 11.00 (11) | 17.00 (17) | 34 (34) | | 3.00 (3) | +0.00 (+0) | 13.00 (13) | +2.00 (+2) | 18.00 (18) | +1.00 (+1) | 34 (34) | (0) | 14.00 (14) | +11.00 (+11) | 17.00 (17) | +4.00 (+4) | 31 (31) | (-3) |
| Mushkegowuk—James Bay; Candidate: André Robichaud (Mulroney) | 3.00 (3) | 1.00 (1) | 8.00 (8) | 43.00 (43) | 55 (55) | | 1.00 (1) | +0.00 (+0) | 11.00 (11) | +3.00 (+3) | 43.00 (43) | +0.00 (+0) | 55 (55) | (0) | 28.00 (28) | +27.00 (+27) | 15.00 (15) | +4.00 (+4) | 43 (43) | (-12) |
