= Althia Raj =

Canadian political journalist

- Born: Ontario, Canada
- Occupation: Journalist

Althia Raj is a Canadian political journalist and a member of the Parliamentary Press Gallery. She is a regular columnist with the Toronto Star.

== Career ==
She was formerly the Ottawa Bureau Chief for HuffPost Canada, where she managed the Quebec City bureau and hosted and produced the politics podcast Follow-Up until BuzzFeed purchased HuffPost and abruptly ended Canadian operations. Her team held live town halls with Prime Minister Justin Trudeau, Minister of Finance Bill Morneau and Minister of Canadian Heritage Mélanie Joly. She went to school at McGill University, and is a francophone.

Prior to joining HuffPost in August 2011, Raj worked as a national political reporter for Postmedia News and has also reported from Parliament Hill for Sun Media and has been a producer for CTV and for CBC Radio's weekly national political magazine, The House.

Raj was also a regular panelist on CBC News Network's Power & Politics program and appears weekly as a panelist alongside Andrew Coyne and Chantal Hébert on At Issue on CBC's The National hosted by Rosemary Barton. Raj also assists with coverage on various CPAC programs.

In 2016, Raj was in conflict with Senator Leo Housakos when she named him as the source of a leak regarding the Senate's spending audit the previous year. Housakos replied by accusing Raj of conducting a smear campaign against him and demanded an apology when she accused him of lying.

On February 28, 2018, Raj moderated the second all-candidates debate for the 2018 Progressive Conservative Party of Ontario leadership election.

Before becoming a journalist, Raj worked at the Department of Foreign Affairs and International Trade. She later worked as an intern at the Canadian Mission to the United Nations in New York City. She has written an e-book, Contender: The Justin Trudeau Story. Raj joined the Toronto Star in September 2021.
