= Catholic Civil Rights League =

Canadian lay Catholic organization

- Abbreviation: CCRL
- Formation: 1985
- Type: Religious organizations based in Canada
- Legal status: active
- Purpose: lobbying, courts, and media relations
- Headquarters: Ottawa, Ontario
- Region served: Canada
- Official language: English; French
- Website: Official website

The Catholic Civil Rights League is a Canadian lay Catholic organization which makes statements in the media about Catholicism and which lobbies the government and takes part in court cases to advocate policies in line with its interpretation of Catholic teachings. The CCRL has played a prominent role in Canadian social debates surrounding abortion, same-sex marriage and prostitution, where it has argued from a social conservative standpoint, in line with Catholic social teaching. The organization works closely with other Catholic organizations on social issues that matter for the Church.

The group was formed in 1985 to counter anti-Catholic sentiment, which had increased when the Ontario provincial government had extended funding to Catholic secondary schools.

== Media ==
The League opposes what it views as anti-Catholicism and anti-religion in the media. It responds to criticism of Catholic teaching in the media and to comedy programs about Catholic characters which it views as blasphemous, sometimes filing complaints with the Canadian Broadcast Standards Council (CBSC) and Canadian Radio-Television and Telecommunications Commission (CRTC). It has opposed media such as the television show Father Ted, the film Dogma, and the book The Golden Compass.

== Court and tribunal cases ==
CCRL has been involved in a number of cases which relate to its interpretation of Catholicism, opposing same-sex marriage in several cases in the late 90s and early 2000s, calling for the notwithstanding clause to be used to overrule court decision in favour of same-sex marriage. It opposed the Ontario court's decision in the "three-parent case" which determined that a child's second custodial parent could become his legal parent without a non-custodial biological parent surrendering parental status. It has also taken a socially conservative position in a case challenging Canada's restrictions on prostitution, and advocated for policies protecting discrimination and hate speech against LGBT people, and displays of graphic anti-abortion posters where not permitted, as an expression of religious belief.
