= Canadian provincial and territorial photo cards =

Canadian provincial IDs

In Canada, provincial driver's licences are the primary form of government-issued photo ID. Most Canadian provinces produce photo ID cards for Canadians who do not drive. A common feature of these cards is that it cannot be held concurrently with a valid drivers licence.

== Provinces ==
Province	Name of Card	Minimum Age	Validity (years)	Enhanced Version	Fee	Renew Fee	Notes	ref
Alberta	ID Card	12	5	no	$49	$49	People under 18 must receive consent from a parent or guardian.	
British Columbia	B.C. identification card (BCID)	12	5		$35	$15		
Manitoba	Manitoba Identification Card	12	5	no	$20	$20	People under 18 must receive co-sign from parents. Enhanced version discontinued June 1, 2022.	
New Brunswick	Photo ID Card	No Minimum	4	no	$48	$48		
Newfoundland and Labrador	Photo ID Card		5	no	$25	$25	Senior fee $16	
Nova Scotia	Nova Scotia Photo ID Card	No Minimum	5		$17.70	$17.70		
Ontario	Ontario Photo Card	16	5	no	$35	$35	Photos expire in 10 years, separately from the card's own expiration. A new photo must be taken after this 10-year period.	
Prince Edward Island	Photo ID Card		5	no	$50	$50	People 18 and older have fee waived if they do not or cannot have a driver's licence. A card valid for a single year can be obtained for a fee of $20.	
Saskatchewan	Photo ID Card		5	no	free	$15	Seniors do not pay a renew fee.	

=== Alberta ===
Alberta provides its residents with an Alberta identification card. This card is produced by Service Alberta. The minimum age for this card to be issued is 12, but anyone under the age of 18 requires parental consent. Alberta does not produce an enhanced card for non-drivers.

=== British Columbia ===
British Columbia produces the B.C. identification card (BCID). The minimum age to apply for this card is 12 years of age, although people under the age of 19 require parental consent. Production of these cards is administered by the Insurance Corporation of British Columbia, the same office as BC driver's licences. There is a $35 fee for five years, unless a valid drivers licence is exchanged.

British Columbia produced an enhanced ID card to be used as proof of citizenship at land borders.

=== Manitoba ===
Manitoba produces both a Manitoba identification card and Manitoba enhanced identification card for non-drivers. These cards are issued by Manitoba Public Insurance, and there is a $20 fee for five years.

=== New Brunswick ===
New Brunswick produces a photo ID card for non-drivers for a $48 fee, or $15 for a replacement. The card expires after four years.

=== Newfoundland and Labrador ===
Newfoundland and Labrador produces photo identification cards. The fee is $25 for five years. The province does not produce an enhanced ID card.

=== Nova Scotia ===
As of February 2017, all driver's licences and provincial identification cards conform to the enhanced security measures.

=== Ontario ===
In July 2011, the Government of Ontario introduced the Ontario photo card for Ontarians who do not hold a valid Ontario driver's licence. The fee is $35 for five years. As of May 2012, more than 40,000 cards are in circulation. It is offered at 85 ServiceOntario locations. As of 2012, although the Ontario government has produced an enhanced driver's licence, there is no corresponding enhanced photo card as the EDL program is being phased out as of June 2019.

=== Prince Edward Island ===
Prince Edward Island produces the voluntary ID for residents of PEI who do not drive. These cards are produced by Access PEI.

=== Quebec ===
As of 2024, Quebec does not have a photo card for non-drivers. Residents may use their Quebec health insurance cards as ID, however, as they contain photos.

=== Saskatchewan ===
Saskatchewan produces a photo ID for non-drivers, issued through Saskatchewan Government Insurance (SGI). There is a $15 fee for the production of this card.

== Territories ==
=== Northwest Territories ===
In 2012 NWT began issuing the Northwest Territories general identification card

=== Nunavut ===
In 2008 Nunavut began issuing general identification cards.

=== Yukon ===
Yukon Territory introduced the Yukon general identification card in October 2010, while also upgrading the security features of Yukon driving licences. The fee is $25 for five years. Prior to these cards, non-drivers used a territorial liquor card.
