= 41st Parliament of Ontario =

Canadian state legislature (2014–2018)

←	40th	42nd	→
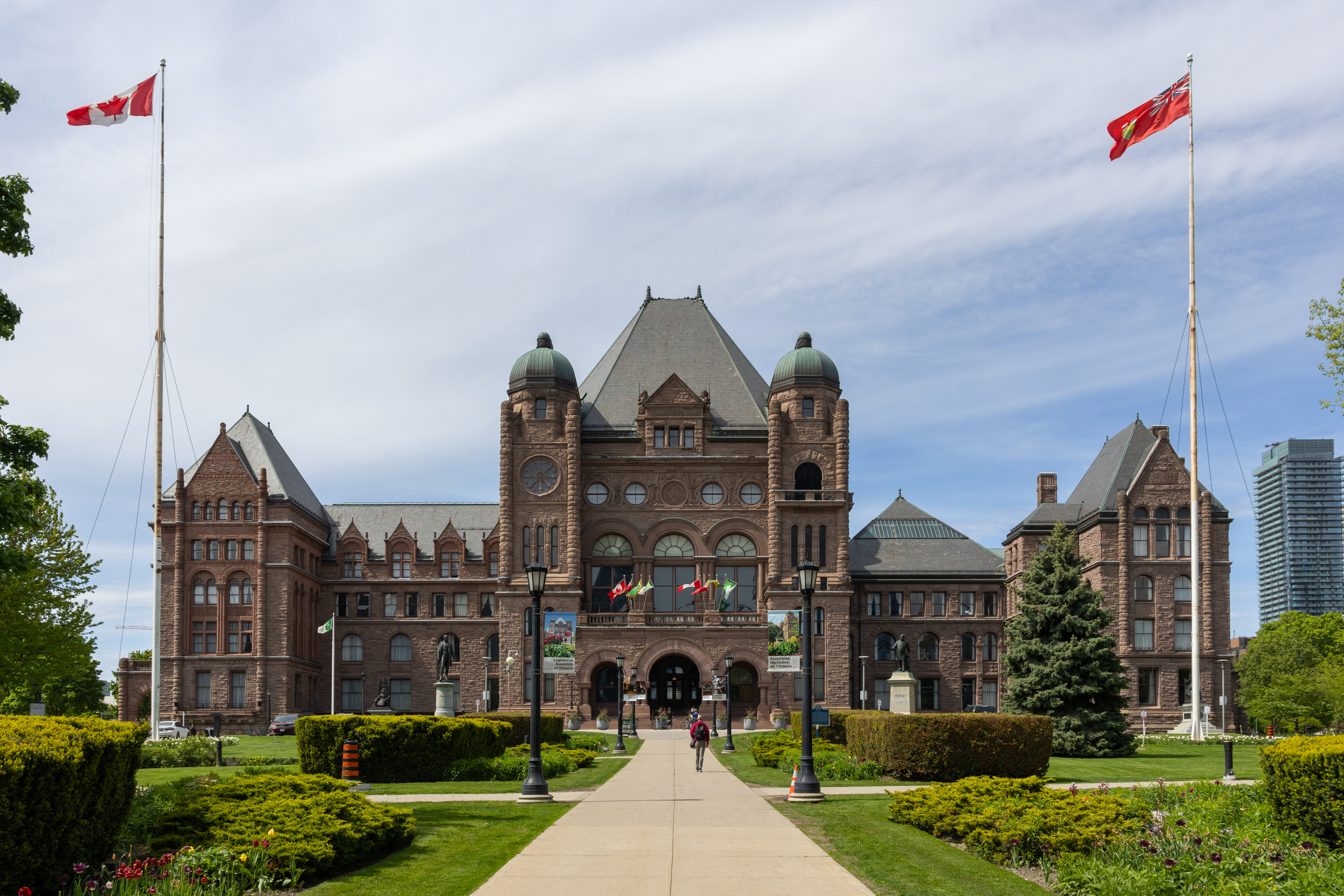
- Ontario Legislative Building

Overview
- Legislative body: Legislative Assembly
- Jurisdiction: Ontario, Canada
- Meeting place: Ontario Legislative Building
- Term: June 12, 2014 – May 8, 2018
- Election: 2014 Election
- Government: Wynne ministry (Liberal)
- Members: 107
- Speaker: Dave Levac
- Premier: Kathleen Wynne
- Leader of the Opposition: Jim Wilson (2014–15); Patrick Brown (2015–18); Vic Fedeli (2018)
- Leader, 3rd party: Andrea Horwath
- Party control: 58 / 107(54%)

Sessions
- 1st: July 2, 2014 – September 8, 2016
- 2nd: September 12, 2016 – March 15, 2018
- 3rd: March 19, 2018 – May 8, 2018

The 41st Parliament of Ontario was the Legislature of Ontario, a province of Canada, that was in office between June 2014 and June 2018. Its membership was set by the 2014 Ontario general election, during which the Ontario Liberal Party led by Premier Kathleen Wynne won a majority of the seats. In opposition to the government were the Progressive Conservative Party of Ontario, the official opposition, and the Ontario New Democratic Party (NDP).

The 41st parliament was presided over by Speaker Dave Levac. It held three legislative session and was dissolved on May 8, 2018.

== Party standing ==
Affiliation	Party leader	Status	Seats				
Affiliation	Party leader	Status	2014 elxn	2015 Sept	2016 Sept (2nd)	2018 Mar. (3rd)	2018 May diss.
Liberal	Kathleen Wynne	Government	58	59	57	55	55
Progressive Conservative	Patrick Brown (Note: Incumbent PC party leader Tim Hudak resigned following election defeated, relinquished parliamentary leadership to Jim Wilson; Brown elected leader May 2015 while a federal MP, assumed parliamentary leadership upon being elected MPP in September 2015, forced out as leader amid allegations of sexual misconduct January 2018; Vic Fedeli assumped interim party and parliamentary leadership, continued in role upon election of Doug Ford as leader.)	Official Opposition	28	27	28	28	27
New Democratic	Andrea Horwath	3rd Party	21	20	20	18	18
Trillium	Jack MacLaren	(Not recgonized)	–	–	–	1	1
Independent (Note: inclusive of members excluded from caucus)			–	–	–	1	2
Total			107	107	105	103	103
Vacant			–	2	2	4	4
Government Majority			9	12	9	7	7

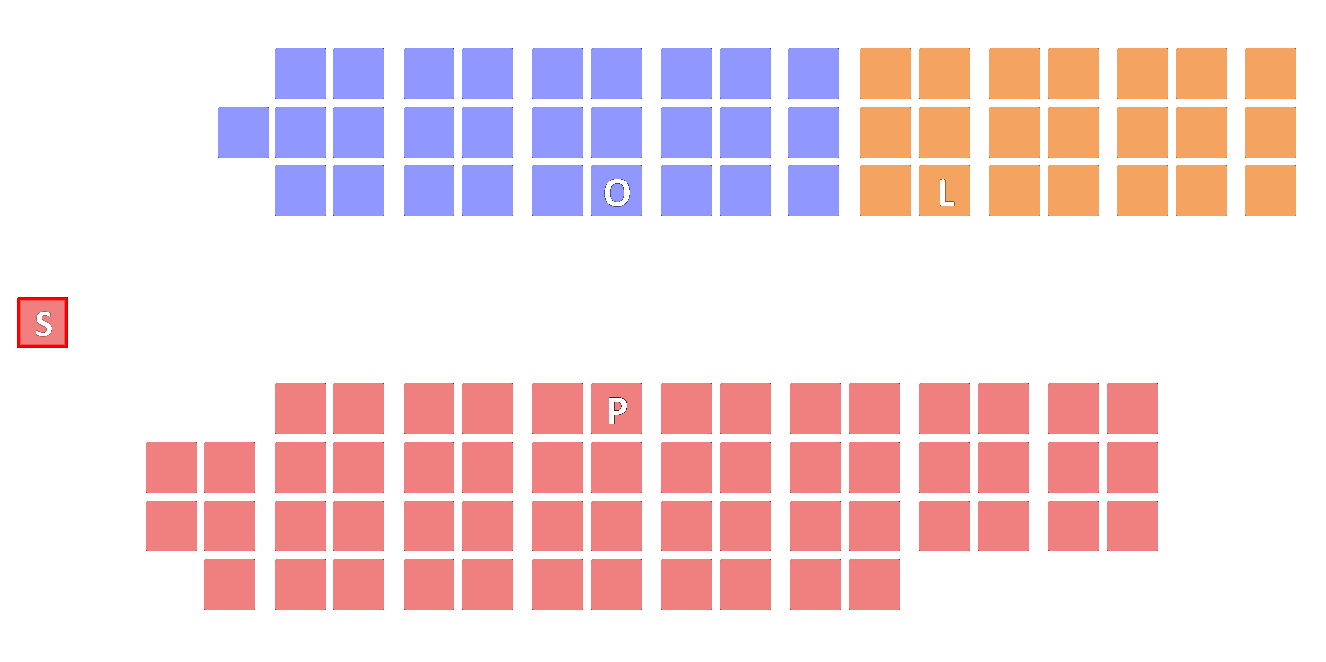
Initial seating arrangement of the 41st Parliament

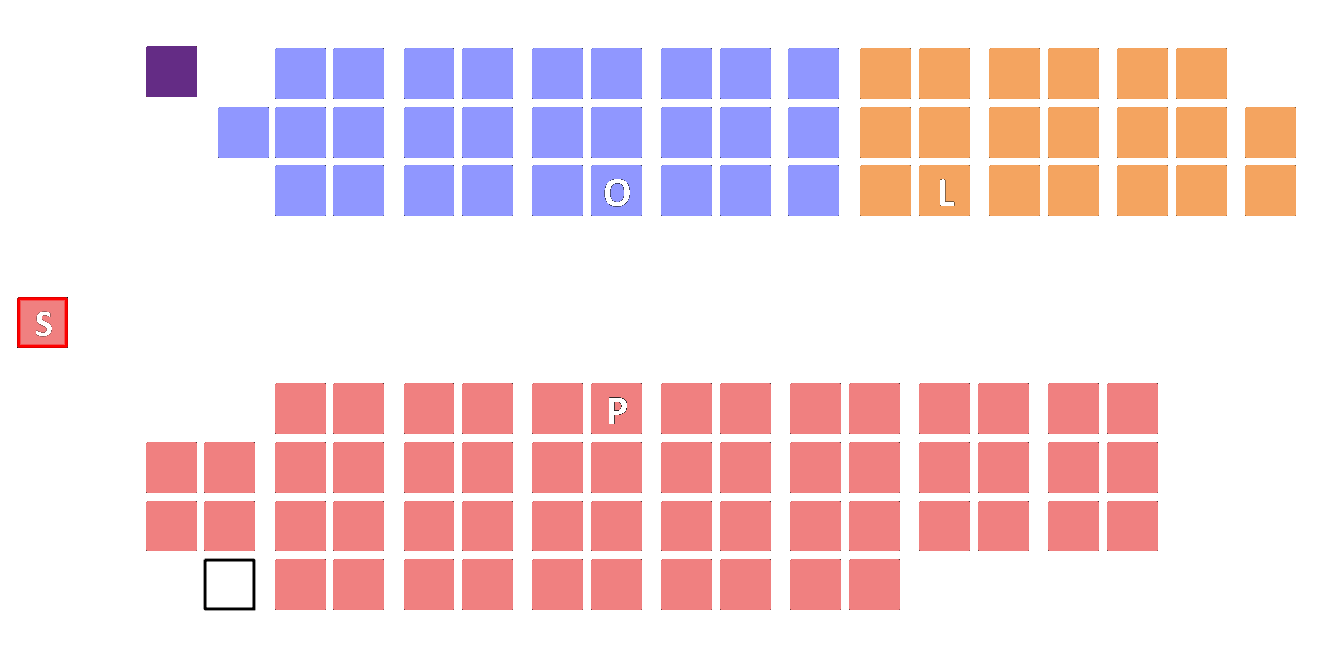
Seating arrangement of 29 May 2017

== Timeline ==
Date	Category	Caucus Impacted	Event
Prior events that are context directly relevant the 44th Parliament
February 11, 2013	Ministry	Lib	Liberal leader Kathleen Wynne (Don Valley West) sworn in as Premier of Ontario, the Wynne ministry succeeded the McGuinty ministry.
May 2, 2014	Legislature		Following threats by the opposition NDP to vote against a tabled budget, Wynne moved preemptively and sought the legislature's dissolution
June 12, 2014	Public		Ontario held generals elections, with the incumbent Liberals returned with a majority mandate.
June 17, 2014	Caucus	PC	PC Leader Tim Hudak (Niagara West—Glanbrook) announced his intention to resign as party leader on July 2
June 24, 2014	Ministry	Lib	Wynne conducted a major cabinet shuffle that elevated four caucus members, including future leader Steven Del Duca (Vaughan), into cabinet, and resurrected the treasury board portfolio and hand it to her closest confidant Deputy Premier Deb Matthews (London North Centre).
July 2, 2014	Caucus	PC	PC caucus elected Jim Wilson (Simcoe—Grey), a former cabinet minister and the caucus longest serving member, as interim party leader. Wilson defeated MPPs John Yakabuski (Renfrew—Nipissing—Pembroke) and Randy Hillier (Lanark—Frontenac—Lennox and Addington), and became Leader of the Opposition.
July 2, 2014	Legislature		The 41st Parliament convened and re-elected Liberal Dave Levac (Brant) as Speaker of the Legislative Assembly of Ontario.
July 3, 2014	Legislature		Lieutenant Governor David Onley delivered the speech from the throne for the last time as Lieutenant Governor of Ontario, opening the first session of the 41st parliament.
Sep 23, 2014	Public		Elizabeth Dowdeswell sworn in as Lieutenant Governor of Ontario, making the top three of the Order of precedence in Ontario all female for the very first time in the history.
Nov 21, 2014	Membership	NDP	Joe Cimino (Sudbury) resigned from the legislature, citing unexpected family and personal issues from being elected the legislature.
December 16, 2014	By-election	Liberal	NDP MP Glenn Thibeault made surprise announcement of his resignation as MP to contest the upcoming provincial by-election as the Liberal candidate.
Feb 5, 2015	By-election	Lib	Former NDP MP Glenn Thibeault was elected as a Liberal MPP in Sudbury, replacing Joe Cimino.
April 23, 2015	Ministry		Finance minister Charles Sousa (Mississauga—Lakeshore) tabled the 2015 budget, the first after the Liberals' majority win, with $130 billion in public infrastructure investment being announced.
May 9, 2015	Caucus	PC	Barrie Conservative MP Patrick Brown elected leader of the Progressive Conservative Party, dealing a second leadership defeat to Deputy Leader Christine Elliott (Whitby—Oshawa), who was backed by 19 of the 28 PC caucus members.
August 1, 2015	Membership	PC	Garfield Dunlop (Simcoe North) resigned his safe seat to provide PC leader Patrick Brown an opportunity to enter parliament via a by-election.
August 28, 2015	Membership	PC	Christine Elliott (Whitby-Oshawa) resigned from the legislature
Sep 3, 2015	By-election	PC	PC leader Patrick Brown is elected the MPP for Simcoe North in a by-election
Feb 11, 2016	By-election	PC	Lorne Coe elected PC MPP for Whitby-Oshawa in a by-election.
March 23, 2016	Membership	Lib	Bas Balkissoon (Scarborough—Rouge River) resigned from the legislature.
May 30, 2016	Ministry		In response to the report issued by the Truth and Reconciliation Commission, Wynne issued Ontario's formal apology to Indigenous communities for 'generations of abuse' from the floor of the legislature
June 13, 2016	Ministry	Lib	Premier Wynne conducted a major midterm cabinet shuffle. In a move that made international news, Ted McMeekin, considered among the most left-leaning ministers, wrote in a social media post a week prior to the shuffle that he had sought his departure from cabinet for the explicit purpose of making room for women at the table. Two other minister, including Jim Bradley, the dean of the legislature and the only cabinet member to have served in the Peterson ministry, followed suit. The shuffle elevated seven new ministers, five of them women, six of them elected in the 2014 election or later.
June 30, 2016	Membership	Lib	Former Attorney General Madeleine Meilleur (Ottawa—Vanier), who had announced her intention to resign upon her involuntary departure from cabinet, formally resigned resigned from the legislature
Sep 1, 2016	By-election	Lib > █ PC	Raymond Cho won the Scarborough—Rouge River by-election for the PC's, capturing a former Liberal bastion that held by the party since the 1980s.
Sep 8, 2016	Legislature		Lieutenant Governor Elizabeth Dowdeswell prorogued the first session of parliament on the request of Premier Premier Kathleen Wynne.
Sep 12, 2016	Legislature		Beginning of the second session with the Speech from the Throne.
Sep 16, 2016	Membership	PC	Former PC leader Tim Hudak (Niagara West—Glanbrook)from the legislature
Nov 17, 2016	By-election	Lib	Prominent lawyer Nathalie Des Rosiers won by-election in Ottawa—Vanier, retaining the seat for the Liberals
Nov 17, 2016	By-election	PC	Sam Oosterhoff won by-election in Niagara West, retaining the seat for the PC Party and, at age 19, became the youngest Ontario MPP in history.
January 1, 2017	Membership; ministry	Lib	David Orazietti (Sault Ste. Marie) resigned from the legislature and cabinet to take a senior position at Sault College.
April 27, 2017	Ministry		Finance minister Charles Sousa (Mississauga—Lakeshore) tabled the 2017 budget, the first balance budget in 10 years. after the Liberals' majority win, with $130 billion in public infrastructure investment being announced.
May 17, 2017	Caucus	NDP	Jagmeet Singh (Bramalea—Gore—Malton) launched his campaign for the leadership of the federal New Democratic Party
May 28, 2017	Caucus	PC	Carleton—Mississippi Mills MPP Jack MacLaren is removed from the PC party caucus by Patrick Brown after a 2012 video including controversial remarks about Franco-Ontarians becomes public. By the afternoon of May 28, MacLaren announced on Twitter that he had joined the minor right-wing Trillium Party of Ontario.
June 1, 2017	By-election	Lib > █ PC	Progressive Conservative Ross Romano wins the Sault Ste. Marie by-election taking the seat formerly held by Liberal David Orazietti.
July 31, 2017	Membership	Lib	Glen Murray (Toronto Centre) announces resignation effective September 1, 2017 to join the Pembina Institute as executive director.
October 20, 2017	Membership	NDP	Jagmeet Singh (Bramalea—Gore—Malton) resigns his seat after being elected leader of the federal NDP.
Dec 31, 2017	Membership	NDP	Cheri DiNovo (NDP, Parkdale—High Park) resigns her seat.
January 17, 2018	Ministry	Lib	Wynne conducted the last wide-ranging shuffle of the Wynne ministry, during which three of her close allies who have signaled their intention to stand down, including Deputy Premier Deb Matthews excited cabinet. With the shuffle, women made up of 45% of cabinet, a new record for Ontario that remains the high watermark (Note: as of September 2026)
January 25, 2018	Caucus	PC	Patrick Brown (Simcoe North) resigned as PC leader after being accused of sexual misconduct by two women.
January 26, 2018	Caucus	PC	Vic Fedeli (Nipissing) elected interim PC Party leader by the PC caucus.
Feb 16, 2018	Caucus	PC	Former PC leader Patrick Brown (Simcoe North) ejected from the PC caucus.
Feb 26, 2018	Membership; ministry	Lib	Eric Hoskins (St. Paul's) resigned from ministry and the legislature to accept a federal appointment.
March 15, 2018	Legislature		Lieutenant Governor Elizabeth Dowdeswell prorogued the second session of parliament on the request of Premier Kathleen Wynne.
March 19, 2018	Legislature		Beginning of the third session with the Speech from the Throne.
April 9, 2018	Caucus	PC	Michael Harris (Kitchener-Conestoga) removed from PC caucus over text messages "of a sexual nature" to a former intern. He was removed 3 days after the party barred him from running as a PC candidate and 2 days following his own announcement saying he would not seek re-election due to health issues.
May 8, 2018	Legislature		The 41st parliament of Ontario was dissolved by lieutenant Governor Elizabeth Dowdeswell, a provincial election will be held on June 7, 2018

== Members ==
The record holder as the oldest and the youngest serving member of legislature served together during the 41st parliament. Monte Kwinter broke the record as the oldest member during the 40th parliament in 2013, and was 85 years old when the legislature welcomed 19 year-old Sam Oosterhoff in November 2016. Kwinter, a minister in the Peterson and McGuinty ministries, served in the legislature until dissolution in May 2018, retiring at 87 years of age, and held on to the record as the oldest sitting member until February 2024 when the record was broken by Raymond Cho. Oosterhoff was elevated to cabinet in the Ford Ministry in June 2024 at age 27 while still the Baby of the House, held on to the latter distinction until the 2025 provincial election and remains the record holder as the youngest sitting member as of 2026.

=== List of members ===
Name	Party	Riding	First elected / previously elected	No. of terms	Notes
Joe Dickson	Liberal	Ajax—Pickering	2007	3rd term	
Michael Mantha	New Democrat	Algoma—Manitoulin	2011	2nd term	
Ted McMeekin	Liberal	Ancaster—Dundas—Flamborough—Westdale	2000	5th term	
Ann Hoggarth	Liberal	Barrie	2014	1st term	
Arthur Potts	Liberal	Beaches—East York	2014	1st term	
Jagmeet Singh	New Democrat	Bramalea—Gore—Malton	2011	2nd term	Resigned October 20, 2017.
Vacant		Bramalea—Gore—Malton			No by-election will be called prior to the general election.
Harinder Malhi	Liberal	Brampton—Springdale	2014	1st term	
Vic Dhillon	Liberal	Brampton West	2003	4th term	
Dave Levac	Liberal	Brant	1999	5th term	
Bill Walker	Progressive Conservative	Bruce—Grey—Owen Sound	2011	2nd term	
Eleanor McMahon	Liberal	Burlington	2014	1st term	
Kathryn McGarry	Liberal	Cambridge	2014	1st term	
Jack MacLaren	Progressive Conservative	Carleton—Mississippi Mills	2011	2nd term	Progressive Conservative until May 28, 2017.
Jack MacLaren	Trillium	Carleton—Mississippi Mills	2011	2nd term	Progressive Conservative until May 28, 2017.
Rick Nicholls	Progressive Conservative	Chatham-Kent—Essex	2011	2nd term	
Cristina Martins	Liberal	Davenport	2014	1st term	
Michael Coteau	Liberal	Don Valley East	2011	2nd term	
Kathleen Wynne	Liberal	Don Valley West	2003	4th term	
Sylvia Jones	Progressive Conservative	Dufferin—Caledon	2007	3rd term	
Granville Anderson	Liberal	Durham	2014	1st term	
Mike Colle	Liberal	Eglinton—Lawrence	1995	6th term	
Jeff Yurek	Progressive Conservative	Elgin—Middlesex—London	2011	2nd term	
Taras Natyshak	New Democrat	Essex	2011	2nd term	
Yvan Baker	Liberal	Etobicoke Centre	2014	1st term	
Peter Milczyn	Liberal	Etobicoke—Lakeshore	2014	1st term	
Shafiq Qaadri	Liberal	Etobicoke North	2003	4th term	
Grant Crack	Liberal	Glengarry—Prescott—Russell	2011	2nd term	
Liz Sandals	Liberal	Guelph	2003	4th term	
Toby Barrett	Progressive Conservative	Haldimand—Norfolk	1995	6th term	
Laurie Scott	Progressive Conservative	Haliburton—Kawartha Lakes—Brock	2003, 2011	4th term*	Resigned seat on January 8, 2009 to allow PC leader John Tory to enter legislature. Regained seat in 2011 general election.
Indira Naidoo-Harris	Liberal	Halton	2014	1st term	
Andrea Horwath	New Democrat	Hamilton Centre	2004	4th term	
Paul Miller	New Democrat	Hamilton East—Stoney Creek	2007	3rd term	
Monique Taylor	New Democrat	Hamilton Mountain	2011	2nd term	
Lisa Thompson	Progressive Conservative	Huron—Bruce	2011	2nd term	
Sarah Campbell	New Democrat	Kenora—Rainy River	2011	2nd term	
Sophie Kiwala	Liberal	Kingston and the Islands	2014	1st term	
Daiene Vernile	Liberal	Kitchener Centre	2014	1st term	
Michael Harris	Progressive Conservative	Kitchener—Conestoga	2011	2nd term	Was Progressive Conservative until April 9, 2018.
Michael Harris	Independent	Kitchener—Conestoga	2011	2nd term	Was Progressive Conservative until April 9, 2018.
Catherine Fife	New Democrat	Kitchener—Waterloo	2012	2nd term	
Monte McNaughton	Progressive Conservative	Lambton—Kent—Middlesex	2011	2nd term	
Randy Hillier	Progressive Conservative	Lanark—Frontenac—Lennox and Addington	2007	3rd term	
Steve Clark	Progressive Conservative	Leeds—Grenville	2010	3rd term	
Teresa Armstrong	New Democrat	London—Fanshawe	2011	2nd term	
Deb Matthews	Liberal	London North Centre	2003	4th term	
Peggy Sattler	New Democrat	London West	2013	2nd term	
Michael Chan	Liberal	Markham—Unionville	2007	4th term	
Amrit Mangat	Liberal	Mississauga—Brampton South	2007	3rd term	
Dipika Damerla	Liberal	Mississauga East—Cooksville	2011	2nd term	
Harinder Takhar	Liberal	Mississauga—Erindale	2003	4th term	
Charles Sousa	Liberal	Mississauga South	2007	3rd term	
Bob Delaney	Liberal	Mississauga—Streetsville	2003	4th term	
Lisa MacLeod	Progressive Conservative	Nepean—Carleton	2006	4th term	
Chris Ballard	Liberal	Newmarket—Aurora	2014	1st term	
Wayne Gates	New Democrat	Niagara Falls	2014	2nd term	Has a nice mustache.
Tim Hudak	Progressive Conservative	Niagara West—Glanbrook	1995	6th term	Resigned September 16, 2016
Sam Oosterhoff	Progressive Conservative	Niagara West—Glanbrook	2016	1st term	By-election on November 17, 2016
France Gélinas	New Democrat	Nickel Belt	2007	3rd term	
Vic Fedeli	Progressive Conservative	Nipissing	2011	2nd term	
Lou Rinaldi	Liberal	Northumberland—Quinte West	2003, 2014	3rd term*	Defeated in 2011, regained seat in 2014.
Helena Jaczek	Liberal	Oak Ridges—Markham	2007	3rd term	
Kevin Flynn	Liberal	Oakville	2003	4th term	
Jennifer French	New Democrat	Oshawa	2014	1st term	
Yasir Naqvi	Liberal	Ottawa Centre	2007	3rd term	
Marie-France Lalonde	Liberal	Ottawa—Orléans	2014	1st term	
John Fraser	Liberal	Ottawa South	2013	2nd term	
Madeleine Meilleur	Liberal	Ottawa—Vanier	2003	4th term	Resigned June 9, 2016
Nathalie Des Rosiers	Liberal	Ottawa—Vanier	2016	1st term	By-election on November 17, 2016
Bob Chiarelli	Liberal	Ottawa West—Nepean	1987, 2010	6th term*	Resigned seat in 1997 to contest (and subsequently elected) Regional Chair of Ottawa-Carleton. Re-entered legislature on 2010 through a by-election.
Ernie Hardeman	Progressive Conservative	Oxford	1995	6th term	
Cheri DiNovo	New Democrat	Parkdale—High Park	2006	4th term	Resigned December 31, 2017
Vacant		Parkdale—High Park			No by-election will be called prior to the general election.
Norm Miller	Progressive Conservative	Parry Sound—Muskoka	2001	5th term	
Randy Pettapiece	Progressive Conservative	Perth—Wellington	2011	2nd term	
Jeff Leal	Liberal	Peterborough	2003	4th term	
Tracy MacCharles	Liberal	Pickering—Scarborough East	2011	2nd term	
Todd Smith	Progressive Conservative	Prince Edward—Hastings	2011	2nd term	
John Yakabuski	Progressive Conservative	Renfrew—Nipissing—Pembroke	2003	4th term	
Reza Moridi	Liberal	Richmond Hill	2007	3rd term	
Jim Bradley	Liberal	St. Catharines	1977	11th term	Currently the longest serving member in legislature
Eric Hoskins	Liberal	St. Paul's	2009	3rd term	Resigned February 26, 2018.
Vacant		St. Paul's			No by-election will be called prior to the general election.
Bob Bailey	Progressive Conservative	Sarnia—Lambton	2007	3rd term	
David Orazietti	Liberal	Sault Ste. Marie	2003	4th term	Resigned January 1, 2017
Ross Romano	Progressive Conservative	Sault Ste. Marie	2017	1st term	By-election on June 1, 2017
Soo Wong	Liberal	Scarborough—Agincourt	2011	2nd term	
Brad Duguid	Liberal	Scarborough Centre	2003	4th term	
Mitzie Hunter	Liberal	Scarborough—Guildwood	2013	2nd term	
Bas Balkissoon	Liberal	Scarborough—Rouge River	2005	4th term	Resigned March 22, 2016
Raymond Cho	Progressive Conservative	Scarborough—Rouge River	2016	1st term	By-election on September 1, 2016
Lorenzo Berardinetti	Liberal	Scarborough Southwest	2003	4th term	
Jim Wilson	Progressive Conservative	Simcoe—Grey	1990	7th term	Currently the longest serving PC member, along with Ted Arnott
Garfield Dunlop	Progressive Conservative	Simcoe North	1999	5th term	Resigned August 1, 2015 to allow PC leader Patrick Brown to enter legislature
Patrick Brown	Progressive Conservative	Simcoe North	2015	1st term	By-election on September 3, 2015. PC leader until January 25, 2018; PC MPP until February 16, 2018
Patrick Brown	Independent	Simcoe North	2015	1st term	By-election on September 3, 2015. PC leader until January 25, 2018; PC MPP until February 16, 2018
Jim McDonell	Progressive Conservative	Stormont—Dundas—South Glengarry	2011	2nd term	
Joe Cimino	New Democrat	Sudbury	2014	1st term	Resigned November 20, 2014
Glenn Thibeault	Liberal	Sudbury	2015	1st term	By-election on February 5, 2015
Gila Martow	Progressive Conservative	Thornhill	2014	2nd term	
Bill Mauro	Liberal	Thunder Bay—Atikokan	2003	4th term	
Michael Gravelle	Liberal	Thunder Bay—Superior North	1995	6th term	
John Vanthof	New Democrat	Timiskaming—Cochrane	2011	2nd term	
Gilles Bisson	New Democrat	Timmins—James Bay	1990	7th term	Currently the longest serving NDP member
Glen Murray	Liberal	Toronto Centre	2010	3rd term	Resigned September 1, 2017.
Vacant		Toronto Centre			There will be no by-election to fill the seat prior to the general election.
Peter Tabuns	New Democrat	Toronto—Danforth	2006	4th term	
Han Dong	Liberal	Trinity—Spadina	2014	1st term	
Steven Del Duca	Liberal	Vaughan	2012	2nd term	
Cindy Forster	New Democrat	Welland	2011	2nd term	
Ted Arnott	Progressive Conservative	Wellington—Halton Hills	1990	7th term	Currently the longest serving PC member, along with Jim Wilson
Christine Elliott	Progressive Conservative	Whitby—Oshawa	2006	4th term	Resigned August 28, 2015
Lorne Coe	Progressive Conservative	Whitby—Oshawa	2016	1st term	By-election on February 11, 2016
David Zimmer	Liberal	Willowdale	2003	4th term	
Percy Hatfield	New Democrat	Windsor—Tecumseh	2013	2nd term	
Lisa Gretzky	New Democrat	Windsor West	2014	1st term	
Monte Kwinter	Liberal	York Centre	1985	9th term	On January 26, 2013, became the oldest person to ever serve in the Ontario legislature at the age of 81 years 310 days.
Julia Munro	Progressive Conservative	York—Simcoe	1995	6th term	Currently the longest serving female member in legislature
Laura Albanese	Liberal	York South—Weston	2007	3rd term	
Mario Sergio	Liberal	York West	1995	6th term	

== Officeholders ==
Officeholders in the Legislature at dissolution on May 8, 2018.

=== Speaker ===
- Speaker of the Legislative Assembly of Ontario: Hon. Dave Levac (Liberal)

=== Other Chair occupants ===
- Deputy Speaker and Chair of the Committee of the Whole: Soo Wong (Liberal)

=== Leaders ===
- Premier of Ontario: Hon. Kathleen Wynne (Liberal)
- Leader of the Opposition: Vic Fedeli (Progressive Conservative)
- Leader of the Ontario New Democratic Party: Andrea Horwath

=== Floor leaders ===
- Government House Leader: Hon. Yasir Naqvi
- Opposition House Leader: Jim Wilson
- NDP House Leader: Gilles Bisson

=== Whips ===
- Chief Government Whip: Jim Bradley
- Official Opposition Whip: John Yakabuski
- NDP Whip: John Vanthof

=== Front benches ===
- Wynne ministry
- Official Opposition Shadow Cabinet of the 41st Legislative Assembly of Ontario
- Ontario New Democratic Party Shadow Cabinet of the 41st Legislative Assembly of Ontario

== Membership & composition changes ==
=== Summary of changes ===
seat changed hand after by-election
involuntary departure
Progressive Conservative
Liberal
New Democratic
Trillium Party Independent

41st Ontario Parliament (2014–18) - Membership and party affiliation changes
Electoral District	Before			Change	
Electoral District	Date	Reason	Member exited	New member	Date
Sudbury	November 20, 2014	Resignation (Note: Citing strains on health and family)	Joe Cimino	Glenn Thibeault	Feb 5, 2015
Simcoe North	August 1, 2015	Resignation: vacated seat for leader (Note: Resigned to provide opportunity for newly elected leader to enter legislature)	Garfield Dunlop	Patrick Brown	September 3, 2015
Whitby—Oshawa	August 28, 2015	Resignation (Note: Subsequently accepted appointment as Patient Ombudsman; contested 2018 leadership contest; returned in subsequent parliament as MPP for Newmarket—Aurora.)	Christine Elliott	Lorne Coe	February 11, 2016
Scarborough—Rouge River	March 22, 2016	Resignation	Bas Balkissoon	Raymond Cho	Sep 1, 2016
Ottawa—Vanier	June 30, 2016	Resignation (Note: following demotion from cabinet)	Madeleine Meilleur	Nathalie Des Rosiers	Nov 17, 2016
Niagara West—Glanbrook	September 16, 2016	Resignation: for other employment (Note: Chief executive officer of the Ontario Real Estate Association)	Tim Hudak	Sam Oosterhoff	Nov 17, 2016
Sault Ste. Marie	December 31, 2016	Resignation: for other employment (Note: appointed a faculty dean at Sault College)	David Orazietti	Ross Romano	June 1, 2017
Carleton—Mississippi Mills	May 28, 2017	Removal from caucus Subsequently: joined Trillium Party	Jack MacLaren		
Toronto Centre	September 1, 2017	Resignation: for other employment (Note: Became executive director of Pembina Institute)	Glen Murray	Vacant at dissolution	
Bramalea—Gore—Malton	October 20, 2017	Resignation: elected federal NDP leader	Jagmeet Singh	Vacant at dissolution	
Parkdale—High Park	December 31, 2017	Resignation: to return to faith ministry	Cheri DiNovo	Vacant at dissolution	
Simcoe North	February 16, 2018	Removal from caucus (Note: Subsequently briefly entered leadership contest and was disallowed to stand as PC candidate (further information))	Patrick Brown		
St. Paul's	February 26, 2018	Resignation: to accept federal appointment	Eric Hoskins	Vacant at dissolution	
Kitchener-Conestoga	April 9, 2018	Removal from caucus	Michael Harris		

=== Change in party standing ===
41st Ontario Parliament (2014–18) - Changes in party standing
caucus members by date	2014		2015				2016						2017						2018			
caucus members by date	Jun	Nov	Feb	Aug	Aug	Sep	Feb	Mar	Jun	Sep	Sep	Nov	Jan	May	Jun	Sep	Oct	Dec	Feb	Feb	Apr	May
caucus members by date	12	20	5	1	28	3	11	22	30	1	16	17	1	28	1	1	20	31	16	26	9	8
Liberal	58		59					58	57			58	57			56				55		
Progressive Conservative	28			27	26	27	28			29	28	29		28	29				28		27	
New Democratic	21	20															19	18				
Trillium	0													1								
Independent	0																		1		2	
Total members	107	106	107	106	105	106	107	106	105	106	105	107	106		107	106	105	104		103		
Vacant	0	1	0	1	2	1	0	1	2	1	2	0	1		0	1	2	3		4		
Government majority	9	10	11	12	13	12	11	10	9	8	9		8		7	6	7	8		7		

41st Ontario Parliament (2014–18) - Summary of changes in party standing
Party	2014	Decreases ▼			Increases ▲			2018
Party	Elxn	Resign	Death	Cross		Held	Gain	Diss.
Liberal	58	(5)				1	1	55
Progressive Conservative	28	(3)		(3)		3	2	27
New Democratic	21	(3)						18
Trillium	–				1			1
Independent	–			(1)	3			2
Total	107	(4)						103

=== By-election results ===
By-Elections To The 41st Legislative Assembly of Ontario (2014-2018)
