= Merrilee Fullerton =

Canadian physician and politician

The Honourable Merrilee Fullerton ECO
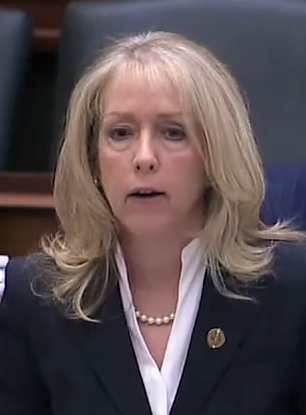

Minister of Children, Community and Social Services
- In office June 18, 2021 – March 24, 2023
- Premier: Doug Ford
- Preceded by: Todd Smith
- Succeeded by: Michael Parsa

Minister of Long-Term Care
- In office June 20, 2019 – June 18, 2021
- Premier: Doug Ford
- Preceded by: Christine Elliott as Minister of Health and Long-Term Care
- Succeeded by: Rod Phillips

Minister of Colleges and Universities
- In office June 29, 2018 – June 20, 2019
- Premier: Doug Ford
- Preceded by: Mitzie Hunter
- Succeeded by: Ross Romano

Member of the Ontario Provincial Parliament for Kanata—Carleton
- In office June 7, 2018 – March 27, 2023
- Preceded by: Riding established
- Succeeded by: Karen McCrimmon

Personal details
- Born: Whitehorse, Yukon, Canada
- Party: Progressive Conservative
- Education: University of Ottawa
- Occupation: Physician

Merrilee K. Fullerton ECO is a Canadian physician and former politician who represented Kanata—Carleton in the Legislative Assembly of Ontario from 2018 to 2023. A member of the Ontario Progressive Conservative (PC) Party, Fullerton was the minister of training, colleges, and universities from 2018 to 2019, minister of long-term care from 2019 to 2021, and minister of children, community and social services from 2021 to 2023.

== Early life and education ==
Fullerton was born in Whitehorse, Yukon, and grew up in the Beaverbrook neighbourhood of Kanata, Ontario. She is a graduate of the University of Ottawa's medical school.

== Medical career ==
Fullerton initially practiced from the Carleton Place and District Hospital before going into private practice as a family physician in the Ottawa area. She practiced medicine in Ontario for 27 years, and also spent time in Alberta during her medical training. She first practiced out of the Carleton Place Hospital, before opening a practice as a family physician at Med-Team Clinic in Kanata.

Fullerton is a former president of the Academy of Medicine Ottawa and served as a member of the Health Professionals Advisory Committee of the Champlain Local Health Integration Network. She was selected as a City of Ottawa Board of Health member for a four-year term which ended in 2014. She was also a member of The Ottawa Hospital’s Community Advisory Committee from 2008 to 2010.

Fullerton was a representative on the Ontario Medical Association Council as well as a delegate to the Canadian Medical Association Council. In those roles, she brought forward concepts regarding the sustainability of Canada’s healthcare system, health human-resource planning, social determinants of health, and virtual care, including mHealth, also known as "mobile health". Most recently, Fullerton assisted in creating and delivering a leadership program for women physicians. She has advocated for a hybrid public healthcare system in Canada.

The College of Physicians and Surgeons of Ontario website indicates that her licence expired in 2014 when she resigned from membership.

=== Columnist ===
Fullerton wrote a number of columns in the Ottawa Citizen from 2004 to 2007. Her columns were on a variety of information related to general health and the healthcare system. She also ran a medical blog on her website.

== Political career ==
Fullerton entered provincial politics in 2016, declaring her intention to run against then-Progressive Conservative MPP Jack MacLaren in Kanata-Carleton. MacLaren caused and encountered a number of issues around this time. On May 28, 2017, MacLaren was kicked out of the Ontario PC caucus and barred from being a candidate in the 2018 election, leading to a two-way race between Fullerton and Police Sergeant Rick Keindel. Fullerton won the nomination.

Fullerton came under fire during the 2018 campaign for her tweets, which were labelled Islamophobic by the Canadian Muslim Public Affairs Committee, as well as for blocking Muslim leaders in her community on Twitter. She was also accused of being in favour of a two-tier healthcare system, a claim which she disputes.

After being elected in the 2018 Ontario general election, she was appointed to Premier Doug Ford's cabinet as the Minister of Colleges and Universities.

In 2019, Fullerton was shuffled and became the Minister of Long-Term Care. During the COVID-19 pandemic in Ontario, about 3,800 residents died from COVID and thousands more infected, by the time Fullerton was shuffled out of that role in June 2021. The situation in five nursing homes required Ontario to get help from the Canadian Armed Forces. In April 2021, both the Auditor General of Ontario and the independent Long-Term Care COVID-19 Commission issued reports finding that the Ontario government had reacted too slowly to the spread of COVID-19 and that decades of neglect from Fullerton and her predecessors had left it systematically unprepared to deal with a pandemic. Fullerton came under fire for dodging questions on the reports and blaming the actions of Liberal predecessors, but committed the government to implementing some of the recommendations.

In June 2021, Fullerton was reassigned as the Minister of Children, Community and Social Services. During her tenure, Ontario failed to meet its targets of 8,000 families getting funding for autism therapies by Fall 2022 and stopped updating the public and the press on progress on the file. The Ontario Autism Coalition complained that it had not been consulted by Fullerton and that she never gave a press conference on the issue.

On March 24, 2023, Fullerton issued a public statement that she was resigning as both a cabinet minister and MPP, effective immediately. However, her resignation as an MPP was effective March 27. The by-election for her successor was scheduled for July 27, 2023.

== Electoral record ==
2022 Ontario general election: Kanata—Carleton
Party	Candidate	Votes	%	±%	Expenditures
Progressive Conservative	Merrilee Fullerton	19,871	43.61	+0.41	$81,000
New Democratic	Melissa Coenraad	11,045	24.24	−4.93	$41,326
Liberal	Shahbaz Syed	10,672	23.42	+6.41	$58,626
Green	Pat Freel	2,503	5.49	+0.20	$10,073
New Blue	Jennifer Boudreau	1,085	2.38		$3,718
Ontario Party	Brian Chuipka	393	0.86		$0
Total valid votes/expense limit		45,569	99.72	+0.50	$124,510
Total rejected, unmarked, and declined ballots		126	0.28	-0.50	
Turnout		45,695	51.38	-10.94	
Eligible voters		88,389			
Progressive Conservative hold		Swing		+2.67	
Source(s): "Summary of Valid Votes Cast for Each Candidate" (PDF). Elections Ontario. 2022. Archived from the original on 2023-05-18.; "Statistical Summary by Electoral District" (PDF). Elections Ontario. 2022. Archived from the original on 2023-05-21.

2018 Ontario general election: Kanata—Carleton
Party	Candidate	Votes	%	±%
Progressive Conservative	Merrilee Fullerton	23,089	43.19	-2.39
New Democratic	John Hansen	15,592	29.17	+15.21
Liberal	Stephanie Maghnam	9,090	17.01	-16.35
Green	Andrew West	2,827	5.29	-1.81
Trillium	Jack MacLaren	1,947	3.64	
Libertarian	Peter D'Entremont	524	0.98	
None of the Above	Robert LeBrun	384	0.72	
Total valid votes		53,453	99.22	
Total rejected, unmarked and declined ballots		418	0.78	
Turnout		53,871	62.32	
Eligible voters		86,449		
Progressive Conservative notional hold		Swing		-8.80
Source: Elections Ontario

== Cabinet posts ==
Ford ministry, Province of Ontario (2018–present)
Cabinet posts (3)
Predecessor	Office	Successor
Todd Smith (politician)	Minister of Children, Community and Social Services; June 18, 2021-March 24, 2023	Michael Parsa
Christine Elliott as Minister of Health and Long-Term Care	Minister of Long-Term Care; June 20, 2019-June 18, 2021	Rod Phillips (politician)
Mitzie Hunter	Minister of Colleges and Universities; June 29, 2018–June 20, 2019; Training was moved to Labour.	Ross Romano
