= Kanata—Carleton =

Kanata—Carleton could refer to:

- Kanata—Carleton (federal electoral district)
- Kanata—Carleton (provincial electoral district)
