= Official Opposition Shadow Cabinet of the 41st Legislative Assembly of Ontario =

The Official Opposition Shadow Cabinet of the 41st Legislative Assembly of Ontario, Canada was the shadow cabinet of the main Opposition party, responsible for holding Ministers to account and for developing and disseminating the party's policy positions. In the 41st Legislative Assembly of Ontario, which lasted from 2014 until 2018, the Official Opposition was formed by the Progressive Conservative Party of Ontario. The Progressive Conservative MPP's not in the final shadow cabinet were former leader Tim Hudak and Jack MacLaren as well as Michael Harris. Christine Elliott resigned her seat on August 28, 2015, following her defeat in the party leadership election.

Critic	Portfolio	Duration
Vic Fedeli	Leader of the Opposition	2018
Patrick Brown	Leader of the Opposition	2015-2018
Jim Wilson	Leader of the Opposition	2014-2015
Ted Arnott	Economic Development, Employment & Infrastructure	2014-2018
Bob Bailey	Natural Resources (Oil, Gas & Aggregates)	2014–2018
Toby Barrett	Agriculture, Food & Rural Affairs	2014–2018
Steve Clark	House Leader	2014-2018
Steve Clark	Co-Deputy Leader of the Opposition	2015-2018
Garfield Dunlop	Education	2014-2015
Garfield Dunlop	Training, Colleges & Universities	2014-2018
Christine Elliott	Health	2012-2015
Vic Fedeli	Finance	2014-2018
Ernie Hardeman	Municipal Affairs & Housing	2014-2018
Michael Harris	Transportation	2014-2018
Randy Hillier	Labour, Research & Innovation	2009-2018
Sylvia Jones	Attorney General	2012-2018
Sylvia Jones	Caucus Chair	2012-2018
Sylvia Jones	Co-Deputy Leader of the Opposition	2015-2018
Jack MacLaren	Senate and Democratic Reform	2014-2016
Lisa MacLeod	President of the Treasury Board	2014-2018
Gila Martow	Intergovernmental Affairs & GTA Issues	2014-2018
Gila Martow	Minister Responsible for Francophone Affairs	2014-2018
Jim McDonell	Children & Youth Services	2014-2018
Jim McDonell	Minister Responsible for Poverty Reduction Strategy	2014-2018
Monte McNaughton	Citizenship, Immigration & International Trade	2014-2018
Norm Miller	Northern Development & Mines	2011-2018
Norm Miller	Aboriginal Affairs	2014-2018
Julia Munro	Associate Minister of Finance (Ontario Pension Plan)	2014-2018
Rick Nicholls	Community Safety & Correctional Services	2014-2018
Randy Pettapiece	Government & Consumer Affairs Responsible for Seniors	2014-2018
Laurie Scott	Tourism, Culture & Sport	2014-2018
Laurie Scott	Women's Issues	2011-2018
Todd Smith	Responsible for the 2015 Pan and Parapan American Games	2014-2018
Lisa Thompson	Environment & Climate Change	2014-2018
Bill Walker	Community & Social Services	2014-2018
John Yakabuski	Energy	2014-2018
John Yakabuski	Chief Opposition Whip	2011-2018
Jeff Yurek	Natural Resources & Forestry	2014-2018

== See also ==
- Executive Council of Ontario
- Ontario New Democratic Party Shadow Cabinet of the 41st Legislative Assembly of Ontario
