= Carleton—Mississippi Mills (provincial electoral district) =

Carleton–Mississippi Mills
Ontario electoral district
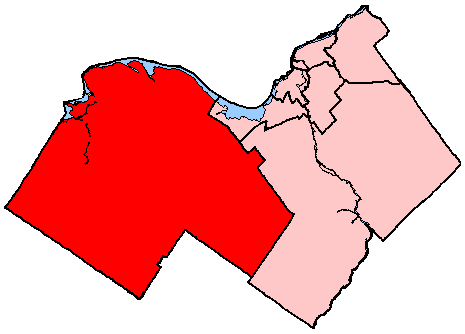
- Carleton–Mississippi Mills in relation to other Ottawa electoral districts

Defunct provincial electoral district
- Legislature: Legislative Assembly of Ontario
- District created: 2004
- District abolished: 2018
- First contested: 2007
- Last contested: 2014

Demographics
- Population (2006): 128,915
- Electors (2007): 91,649
- Area (km²): 1,619
- Census division(s): Ottawa, Lanark County
- Census subdivision(s): Mississippi Mills, West Carleton, Kanata, Goulbourn

Carleton–Mississippi Mills was a provincial electoral district in eastern Ontario, Canada. It was created for the 2007 provincial election. 78.7% of the riding came from Lanark–Carleton while 21.3% came from Nepean–Carleton.

The riding included the town of Mississippi Mills plus the former municipalities of West Carleton, Kanata and Goulbourn.

Following the 2018 election, the riding was dissolved. Most of the Ottawa portion became Kanata—Carleton, except for a sliver in the south that was transferred to Carleton. Mississippi Mills was transferred to Lanark—Frontenac—Kingston.

== Members of Provincial Parliament ==
Carleton—Mississippi Mills
Assembly	Years	Member	Party
Riding created from Lanark—Carleton and Nepean—Carleton
39th	2007–2011	Norm Sterling	Progressive Conservative
40th	2011–2014	Jack MacLaren	Progressive Conservative
41st	2014–2017	Jack MacLaren	Progressive Conservative
41st	2017–2018	Jack MacLaren	Trillium
Riding dissolved into Kanata—Carleton, Carleton, and Lanark—Frontenac—Kingston

== Election results ==
2014 Ontario general election
Party	Candidate	Votes	%	±%
Progressive Conservative	Jack MacLaren	30,590	47.49	−2.80
Liberal	Rosalyn Stevens	20,472	31.78	−2.31
New Democratic	John Hansen	8,744	13.57	+2.23
Green	Andrew West	4,614	7.16	+3.86
Total valid votes		64,420	98.98	
Total rejected, unmarked and declined ballots		664	1.02	+0.66
Turnout		65,084	56.08	+2.59
Eligible voters		116,047		
Progressive Conservative hold		Swing		−0.25
Source(s) "Official return from the records — 013, Carleton-Mississippi Mills" (PDF). Elections Ontario. 2014.

2011 Ontario general election
Party	Candidate	Votes	%	±%
Progressive Conservative	Jack MacLaren	28,246	50.29	+2.46
Liberal	Megan Cornell	19,144	34.08	+2.15
New Democratic	Liam Duff	6,371	11.34	+3.72
Green	Scott Simser	1,857	3.31	−7.20
Family Coalition	Cynthia Bredfeldt	549	0.98	+0.18
Total valid votes		56,167	99.64	
Total rejected, unmarked and declined ballots		204	0.36	−0.09
Turnout		56,371	53.50	−1.81
Eligible voters		105,371		
Progressive Conservative hold		Swing		+0.16
Source(s) "Summary of Valid Votes Cast for Each Candidate – October 6, 2011 General Election" (PDF). Elections Ontario. Nov 18, 2011. "Statistical Summary – General Elections 2011" ( XLS Spreadsheet). Elections Ontario. Oct 1, 2013.

2007 Ontario general election
Party	Candidate	Votes	%	±%
Progressive Conservative	Norm Sterling	25,126	47.83	−3.49
Liberal	Megan Cornell	16,776	31.93	−5.89
Green	John Ogilvie	5,517	10.50	
New Democratic	Michael Hadskis	4,002	7.62	+2.11
Libertarian	Rob Alexander	693	1.32	
Family Coalition	Reynolds James	419	0.80	
Total valid votes		52,533	99.55	
Total rejected ballots		238	0.45	
Turnout		52,771	55.30	
Eligible voters		95,421		
Progressive Conservative hold		Swing		+1.20
Note: Change in percentage of vote calculated on results redistributed from predecessor ridings.
Source(s) "Summary of Valid Votes Cast for Each Candidate – October 10, 2007 General Election" (PDF). Elections Ontario. Aug 14, 2008. "Statistical Summary – General Elections 2007" (PDF). Elections Ontario. May 8, 2008.

2003 general election redistributed results
Party	Vote	%
Progressive Conservative	19,802	51.32
Liberal	14,593	37.82
New Democratic	2,124	5.50
Others	2,065	5.35

== 2007 electoral reform referendum ==
2007 Ontario electoral reform referendum
Side	Votes	%
First Past the Post	36,565	70.5
Mixed member proportional	15,326	29.5
Total valid votes	51,891	100.0
