= 2023 Kanata—Carleton provincial by-election =

Provincial by-election in Ontario, Canada

- July 27, 2023

Riding of Kanata—Carleton
- Turnout: 35.14%
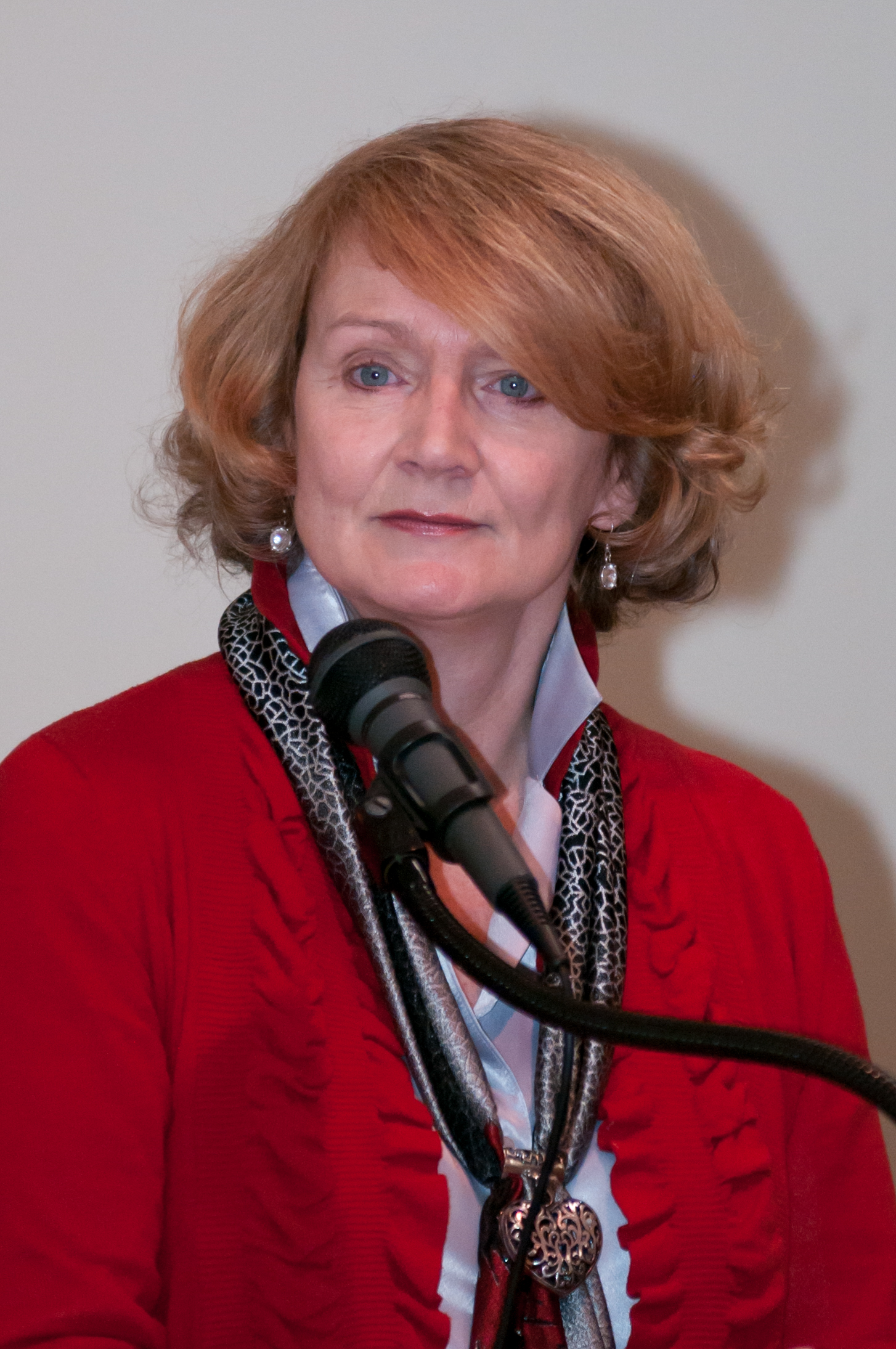
	First party	Second party	Third party
		PC	NDP
Candidate	Karen McCrimmon	Sean Webster	Melissa Coenraad
Party	Liberal	Progressive Conservative	New Democratic
Last election	23.42%	43.61%	24.24%
Popular vote	11,214	10,416	9,560
Percentage	34.66%	32.19%	29.54%
Swing	▲11.24%	▼11.42%	▲5.31%
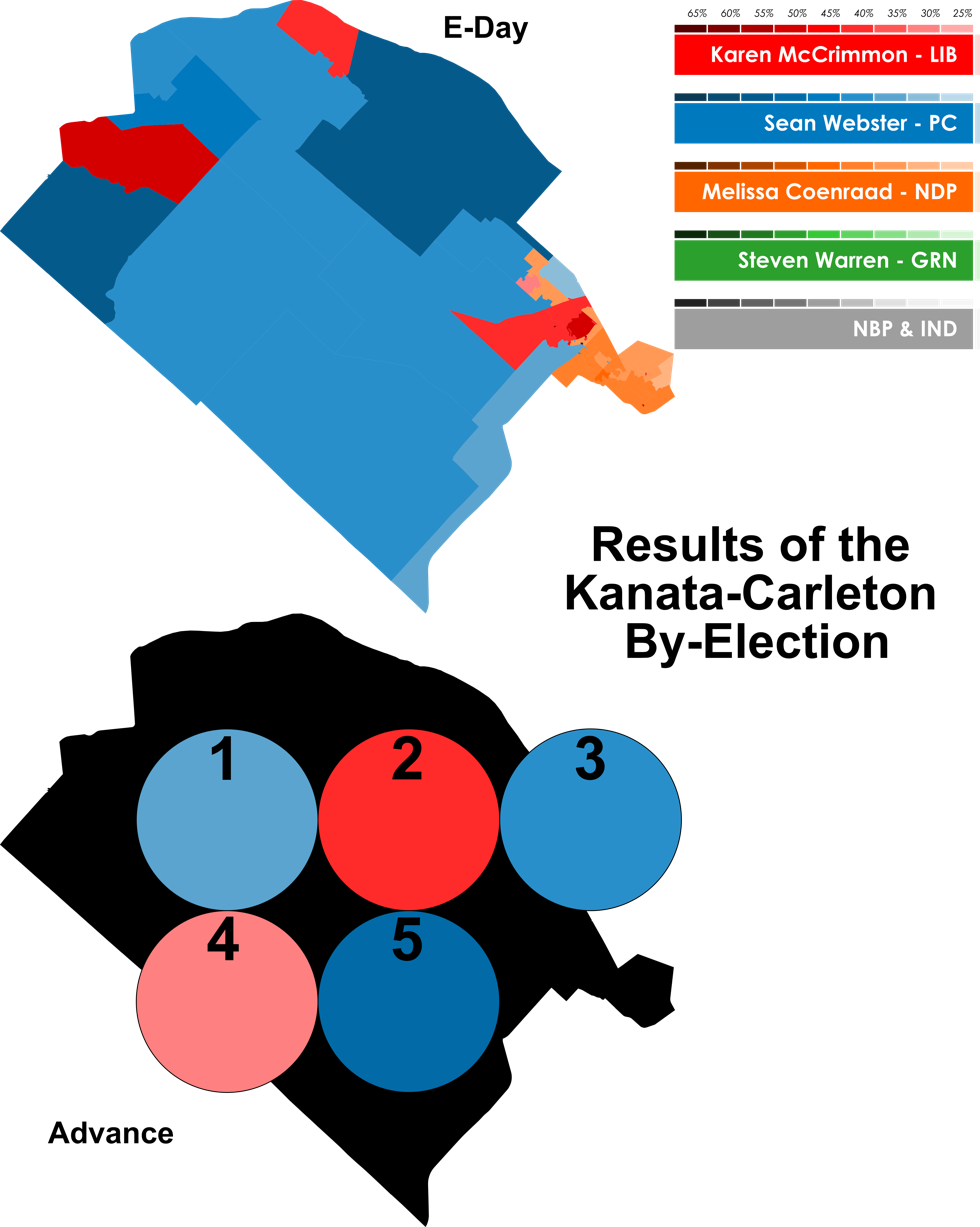
MPP before election
Merrilee Fullerton
Progressive Conservative
Elected MPP
Karen McCrimmon
Liberal

A by-election for the provincial riding of Kanata—Carleton in Ontario was held on July 27, 2023, to elect a new member of the Legislative Assembly of Ontario following the resignation of Progressive Conservative MPP and cabinet minister Merrilee Fullerton.

The election was held on the same day as another in Scarborough—Guildwood.

== Background ==
Kanata—Carleton is a riding on the outskirts of Ottawa containing both suburban and rural voters. It roughly contains the former city of Kanata and the former Township of West Carleton. Ridings containing Kanata and West Carleton have voted Conservative in every provincial election since 1871 except in 1919. However, the federal Liberals have represented the riding, which shares the same boundaries since its creation in 2015.

== Candidates ==
Six candidates filed for the election.

- Jennifer Boudreau, New Blue Party of Ontario
- Melissa Coenraad, Ontario New Democratic Party. Medical lab technician, ran in this riding in 2022.
- Karen McCrimmon, Ontario Liberal Party. Former Member of Parliament for Kanata—Carleton from 2015 to 2021.
- Josh Rachlis, Independent
- Steven Warren, Green Party of Ontario. Political science and criminology student at the University of Ottawa.
- Sean Webster, Progressive Conservative Party of Ontario. Former executive at Canopy Growth.

== Campaign ==
An all-candidates debate was held on July 13. PC candidate Sean Webster was criticized for not participating. The Webster campaign indicated that he decided to spend the time canvassing instead. Tory candidates not showing up for all-candidate debates was a common occurrence during the 2022 Ontario general election.

Issues in the race include health care, housing and the proposed development on the site of the Kanata Golf and Country Club.

== Results ==
Ontario provincial by-election, July 27, 2023: Kanata—Carleton Resignation of Merrilee Fullerton
Party	Candidate	Votes	%	±%	Expenditures
Liberal	Karen McCrimmon	11,214	34.66	+11.24	$83,158
Progressive Conservative	Sean Webster	10,416	32.19	–11.42	$83,028
New Democratic	Melissa Coenraad	9,560	29.54	+5.31	$59,139
New Blue	Jennifer Boudreau	636	1.97	–0.42	$9,996
Green	Steven Warren	442	1.37	–4.13	$12,205
Independent	Josh Rachlis	90	0.28	–	$0
Total valid votes		32,358	99.63		
Total rejected, unmarked and declined ballots		121	0.37	+0.10	
Turnout		32,479	35.17	–16.21	
Eligible voters		92,345			
Liberal gain from Progressive Conservative		Swing		+11.33	
Source: Elections Ontario

== See also ==
- List of Ontario by-elections
