= Ontario New Democratic Party Shadow Cabinet of the 41st Legislative Assembly of Ontario =

The Ontario New Democratic Party Shadow Cabinet for the 41st Legislative Assembly of Ontario was announced on May 16, 2017.

- Andrea Horwath (Hamilton Centre) – Leader, Intergovernmental Affairs.
- Teresa Armstrong (London-Fanshawe) – Citizenship, Immigration and International Trade; and Seniors Affairs; Anti-Racism Directorate.
- Gilles Bisson (Timmins-James Bay) – Natural Resources and Forestry; Attorney General
- Sarah Campbell (Kenora-Rainy River) – Aboriginal Affairs; and Women's Issues
- Joe Cimino (Sudbury) – Transportation.
- Cheri DiNovo (Parkdale-High Park) – Urban Transit; GTA Issues; and LGBTQ.
- Jennifer French (Oshawa) – Pensions.
- Catherine Fife (Kitchener Waterloo) – Finance; and Treasury Board.
- Cindy Forster (Welland) – Municipal Affairs and Housing; and Community and Social Services.
- Wayne Gates (Niagara Falls) – Economic Development and Employment; and Small Business; Government and Consumer Services.
- France Gelinas (Nickel Belt) – Francophone Affairs; and Health and Long-Term Care
- Lisa Gretzky (Windsor West) – Community Safety and Correctional Services
- Percy Hatfield (Windsor Tecumseh) – Infrastructure; and Environment and Climate Change
- Michael Mantha (Algoma-Manitoulin) – Northern Development and Mines.
- Paul Miller (Hamilton East-Stoney Creek) – Tourism, Culture and Sport; and 2015 Pan and Parapan American Games.
- Taras Natyshak (Essex) – Labour.
- Peggy Sattler (London-West) – Training, Colleges, and Universities; and Research and Innovation.
- Peter Tabuns (Toronto-Danforth) – Education; and Energy.
- Monique Taylor (Hamilton Mountain) – Children and Youth Services.
- John Vanthof (Timiskaming-Cochrane) – Agriculture, Food and Rural Affairs

== See also ==
- Executive Council of Ontario
- Official Opposition Shadow Cabinet of the 41st Legislative Assembly of Ontario
