= Kanata—Carleton (provincial electoral district) =

Provincial electoral district in Ontario, Canada

Coordinates: 45.371°N 76.097°W

Ontario electoral district

Provincial electoral district
- Legislature: Legislative Assembly of Ontario
MPP
Karen McCrimmon
Liberal
- District created: 2015
- First contested: 2018
- Last contested: 2025

Demographics
- Population (2016): 110,965
- Electors (2018): 86,449
- Area (km²): 806
- Pop. density (per km²): 137.7
- Census division: Ottawa
- Census subdivision: Ottawa

Kanata—Carleton is a provincial electoral district in Ottawa, Ontario, Canada, which was first contested in the 2018 provincial election.

== History ==
The riding was created federally with the 2012 redistribution process. That same process was announced by the Ontario government, meaning the provincial ridings will follow a similar boundary division for the 2018 provincial election. The new riding contains almost all of the portion of the former Carleton—Mississippi Mills located in Ottawa, except for the portion south of Highway 7/Highway 417 that transferred Carleton. A small fraction came from Nepean—Carleton surrounding the Bridlewood neighbourhood.

Its first MPP, Merrilee Fullerton resigned in 2023, triggering a by-election. The Liberals won the by-election, replacing the Progressive Conservatives after decades of straight wins in the area.

== Geography ==
The riding roughly covers the Ottawa suburb of Kanata and the rural West Carleton-March Ward, including the communities of Carp, Constance Bay, Corkery, Dunrobin, Fitzroy Harbour, Galetta, Kinburn and Marathon Village.

The riding covers an area within a boundary defined as follows: Western limit of Ottawa starting at Highway 7. NE along Highway 7 to Highway 417. NE along Highway 417 to Maple Grove Road. NE along Maple Grove Road to the Carp River. SE along the Carp River to the SW section of Spearman Lane. NE along Spearman Lane to Terry Fox Drive. SE along Terry Fox to Hope Side Road. NE along Hope Side Road to Richmond Road. N along Richmond Road to West Hunt Club Road. NW to Haanel Drive with Robertson Road. SW along Robertson Road to Eagleson Road. NW along Eagleson Road to March Road, Herzberg Road and March Valley Road to Riddell Road to the interprovincial boundary between Ontario and Quebec. along the boundary to the north limit of the city of Ottawa then SW and SE along the northern and western limits of the city to the point of commencement.

== Members of Provincial Parliament ==
Kanata-Carleton
| Assembly | Years | Member | Party |
|---|---|---|---|
Riding created from Carleton—Mississippi Mills and Nepean—Carleton
| 42nd | 2018–2022 | Merrilee Fullerton | Progressive Conservative |
| 43rd | 2022–2023 | Merrilee Fullerton | Progressive Conservative |
| 43rd | 2023–2025 | Karen McCrimmon | Liberal |
| 44th | 2025–present | Karen McCrimmon | Liberal |

== Electoral history ==
Winning party in each polling division of Kanata—Carleton at the 2025 Ontario general election

2025 Ontario general election
| Party | Candidate | Votes | % | ±% |
|---|---|---|---|---|
| Liberal | Karen McCrimmon | 22,811 | 47.91 | +13.26 |
| Progressive Conservative | Scott Phelan | 19,353 | 40.65 | +8.46 |
| New Democratic | Dave Belcher | 3,419 | 7.18 | –22.36 |
| Green | Jennifer Purdy | 1,199 | 2.52 | +1.15 |
| New Blue | Elizabeth Watson | 503 | 1.06 | –0.91 |
| Ontario Party | Frank Jakubowski | 323 | 0.68 | – |
| Total valid votes | | 47,608 | 99.33 | |
| Total rejected, unmarked and declined ballots | | 323 | 0.67 | +0.30 |
| Turnout | | 47,931 | 50.40 | +15.23 |
| Eligible voters | | 95,098 | | |
| Liberal hold | | Swing | | ▲2.40 |
Source: Elections Ontario

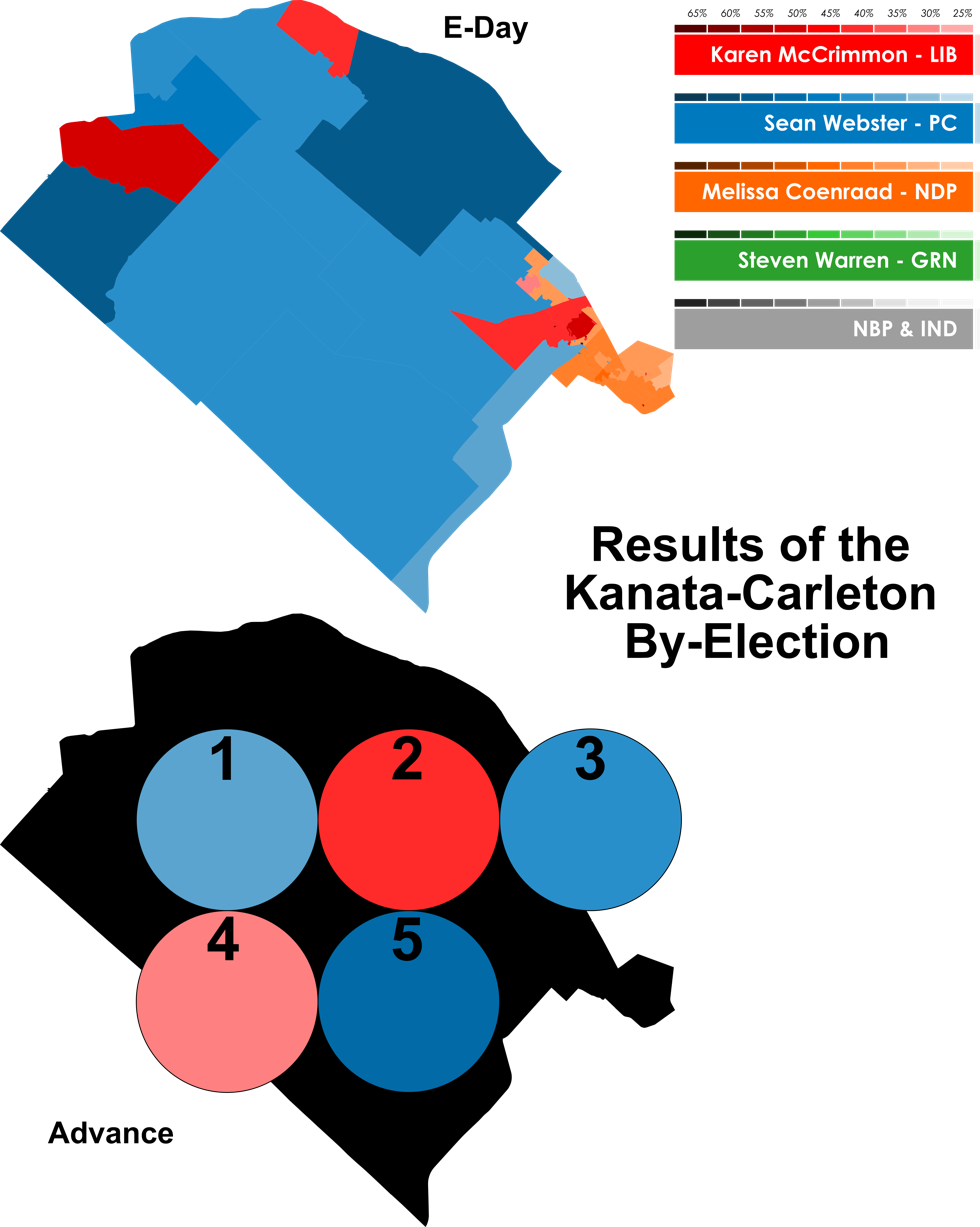

Ontario provincial by-election, July 27, 2023 Resignation of Merrilee Fullerton
| Party | Candidate | Votes | % | ±% | Expenditures |
|---|---|---|---|---|---|
| Liberal | Karen McCrimmon | 11,214 | 34.66 | +11.24 | $83,158 |
| Progressive Conservative | Sean Webster | 10,416 | 32.19 | –11.42 | $83,028 |
| New Democratic | Melissa Coenraad | 9,560 | 29.54 | +5.31 | $59,139 |
| New Blue | Jennifer Boudreau | 636 | 1.97 | –0.42 | $9,996 |
| Green | Steven Warren | 442 | 1.37 | –4.13 | $12,205 |
| Independent | Josh Rachlis | 90 | 0.28 | – | $0 |
| Total valid votes | | 32,358 | 99.63 | | |
| Total rejected, unmarked and declined ballots | | 121 | 0.37 | +0.10 | |
| Turnout | | 32,479 | 35.17 | –16.21 | |
| Eligible voters | | 92,345 | | | |
| Liberal gain from Progressive Conservative | | Swing | | +11.33 | |
Source: Elections Ontario

Winning party in each polling division of Kanata—Carleton at the 2022 Ontario general election

2022 Ontario general election
| Party | Candidate | Votes | % | ±% | Expenditures |
|---|---|---|---|---|---|
| Progressive Conservative | Merrilee Fullerton | 19,871 | 43.61 | +0.41 | $81,000 |
| New Democratic | Melissa Coenraad | 11,045 | 24.24 | –4.93 | $41,326 |
| Liberal | Shahbaz Syed | 10,672 | 23.42 | +6.41 | $58,626 |
| Green | Pat Freel | 2,503 | 5.49 | +0.20 | $10,073 |
| New Blue | Jennifer Boudreau | 1,085 | 2.38 | – | $3,718 |
| Ontario Party | Brian Chuipka | 393 | 0.86 | – | $0 |
| Total valid votes/expense limit | | 45,569 | 99.72 | – | $124,510 |
| Total rejected, unmarked and declined ballots | | 126 | 0.28 | –0.50 | |
| Turnout | | 45,695 | 51.38 | –10.94 | |
| Eligible voters | | 88,936 | | | |
| Progressive Conservative hold | | Swing | | ▲2.67 | |
Source: Elections Ontario

2018 Ontario general election
| Party | Candidate | Votes | % |
|---|---|---|---|
| Progressive Conservative | Merrilee Fullerton | 23,089 | 43.19 |
| New Democratic | John Hansen | 15,592 | 29.17 |
| Liberal | Stephanie Maghnam | 9,090 | 17.01 |
| Green | Andrew West | 2,827 | 5.29 |
| Trillium | Jack MacLaren | 1,947 | 3.64 |
| Libertarian | Peter D'Entremont | 524 | 0.98 |
| None of the Above | Robert Lebrun | 384 | 0.72 |
| Total valid votes | | 53,453 | 99.22 |
| Total rejected, unmarked and declined ballots | | 418 | 0.78 |
| Turnout | | 53,871 | 62.32 |
| Eligible voters | | 86,449 | |
| Progressive Conservative pickup new district. | | | |
Source: Elections Ontario

^ Results are compared to redistributed results

2014 general election redistributed results
| Party | Vote | % |
|---|---|---|
| Progressive Conservative | 19,598 | 45.59 |
| Liberal | 14,340 | 33.36 |
| New Democratic | 6,000 | 13.96 |
| Green | 3,052 | 7.10 |

== See also ==
- List of Ontario provincial electoral districts
- Canadian provincial electoral districts
