= Jack MacLaren =

Canadian politician

Ontario MPP
- In office 2011–2018
- Preceded by: Norm Sterling
- Succeeded by: Riding abolished
- Constituency: Carleton—Mississippi Mills

Personal details
- Born: 1951 (age 74–75) Woodlawn, Ontario, Canada
- Party: Trillium (2017–2021)
- Other political affiliations: Progressive Conservative (2011–2017)
- Education: Queen's University
- Occupation: Farmer, civil engineer

Jack MacLaren (born c. 1951) is a former Canadian politician who represented the eastern Ontario riding of Carleton—Mississippi Mills in the Legislative Assembly of Ontario from 2011 to 2018. Originally elected as a member of the Progressive Conservative Party of Ontario, he was removed from the party's legislative caucus in 2017 by party leader Patrick Brown after a video recording surfaced of him suggesting that the party would repeal Franco-Ontarian language rights in the province. MacLaren announced later that day that he had joined the Trillium Party of Ontario, becoming that party's first MPP.

== Background ==
MacLaren was born in Woodlawn, Ontario in 1951. He is a past president of the Ontario Landowners Association and graduated with a BSc in civil engineering from Queen's University in 1972.

== Politics ==
In 2011, MacLaren contested the party's nomination in the riding of Carleton—Mississippi Mills competing against the sitting MPP Norm Sterling, who had represented the riding and its predecessors in Queen's Park for 34 years. MacLaren won the nomination with the help of one of Sterling's fellow MPPs, Randy Hillier. Hillier, who was also a past president of the Ontario Landowners Association, campaigned on behalf of MacLaren.

In the 2011 provincial election, MacLaren defeated Liberal candidate Megan Cornell by about 9,102 votes. In the 40th Parliament of Ontario, MacLaren served as his party's deputy critic for infrastructure and transportation from October 26, 2011, to September 30, 2013, when he was promoted to be his party's critic for Senate and Democratic reform.

He was re-elected in the June 2014 provincial election defeating Liberal candidate Rosalyn Stevens by 10,029 votes. On July 4, 2014, it was announced that MacLaren would continue to be the party's critic for Senate and Democratic Reform.

In November 2014, MacLaren introduced a private member's bill to repeal the law that grants environmental protections for the Niagara Escarpment for the second time. The bill was named for a late friend of MacLaren's named Bob Mackie who was fighting to prevent the closure of an illegal archery range on his property on the escarpment. MacLaren said that his bill would begin to reverse "the tide of creeping socialism that has been slowly taking away our property rights for decades" and that it would restore the values of "our British Christian cultural heritage of freedom, democracy, common-law and private property rights that date back to the Magna Carta of 1215." Most PC MPPs either stayed away from the chamber during the vote, which was a 40–1 defeat of the bill, but some whose ridings included parts of the escarpment, such as Sylvia Jones, Ted Arnott, and former leader Tim Hudak, stayed to vote against it.

MacLaren was the second MPP to back former federal Conservative Patrick Brown's successful bid for leadership in the 2015 Progressive Conservative leadership election, bringing with him the supporter of the small but dedicated Ontario Landowners Association

In June 2015, MacLaren was accused of betraying social conservative values by Nick Vandergragt, a conservative radio talk show host on Ottawa's CFRA for marching in that year's Toronto Pride parade alongside PC leader Patrick Brown and other conservatives, both federal and provincial.

MacLaren was named his party's Critic for Natural Resources and Forestry on September 10, 2015, as well as the vice-chair of the relevant committee. Brown also made MacLaren, a libertarian, the chairman of the PC's Blue Ribbon Panel on Property Rights. Also in Fall 2015, Brown chose MacLaren to replace fellow Ottawa PC MPP Lisa MacLeod as the party's critic for Eastern Ontario.

On November 26, 2015, MacLaren officially invited a "group of friends and guests" from the Tamil community to hear him make a speech in Queen's Park about the "genocidal onslaught for the Tamils" in Sri Lanka. A week after the speech, the National Post reported that the delegation selected by the Tamil community had included M. K. Eelaventhan, a Tamil politician whom the Canada Border Services Agency was trying to deport from Canada for his previous connections to the Tamil Tigers, which is recognized by Canada as a terrorist organization.

The Toronto Star reported on March 3, 2016, that MacLaren had been making inquiries on behalf of challengers to MacLeod in her Nepean—Carleton riding. MacLaren refused to comment and the Progressive Conservatives dismissed the claims in the story. At the Ottawa party convention which was ongoing when the story broke, Brown publicly endorsed MacLeod's renomination as candidate.

=== Leave, demotion, and sensitivity training ===
MacLaren was forced to apologize on April 6, 2016, after calling his federal Liberal counterpart Karen McCrimmon to the stage at a cancer fundraising dinner the previous month in Carp, and then telling a vulgar joke about her and her husband's sexual relationship. MacLaren emailed an apology to McCrimmon after the story was first reported by the Toronto Star. The incident prompted criticism from across party lines, as fellow Progressive Conservative MPP Lisa MacLeod and federal Conservative MP Michelle Rempel both tweeted in support of McCrimmon. Patrick Brown said that the party had "zero tolerance for misogynistic comments and an apology was made correctly to Karen McCrimmon this morning."

On April 12, 2016, the Ottawa Citizen reported that MacLaren's website included a testimonials section praising his work where most of the constituents were fictional and were represented by photos that had been taken without permission from the internet. One of the testimonials was from a "Robert & Karen" from Constance Bay, which coincidentally is where MacLaren's federal counterpart, Liberal MP Karen McCrimmon lives with her husband Robert. MacLaren's website initially added a disclaimer claiming that the names and depictions of constituents had been changed to protect their privacy before removing the page entirely. MacLaren then issued an apology for the improper use of constituent testimonials and had his website taken offline.

The next day, Patrick Brown decided to demote MacLaren after the events of the past few weeks by replacing him as the party's Eastern Ontario representative in caucus with Jim McDonell. MacLaren kept his position as the shadow cabinet critic for natural resources, the chair of a party panel on property rights, and as an ambassador to ethnic communities.

On April 14, the Ottawa Citizen reported that MacLaren had been heard making vulgar jokes about Premier Kathleen Wynne. Both Wynne and Ontario NDP leader Andrea Horwath called for MacLaren to be kicked out of the Progressive Conservative caucus, and Wynne called for Queen's Park to create a code of conduct for MPPs. Brown ordered MacLaren to go on indefinite leave from the Legislature to focus on constituency work and to undergo sensitivity training. Brown also stated that MacLaren's caucus responsibilities would be reassigned.

On May 31, 2016, MacLaren returned to Queen's Park after completing his sensitivity training.

=== Expulsion from PCs, first Trillium Party MPP ===
On May 28, 2017, Brown expelled MacLaren from the PC caucus, purportedly after a video recording surfaced of a 2012 speech in which he criticized French language rights in the province, and indicated that the party would act to limit them once in office. Brown also stated that MacLaren would not be allowed to run as a Tory in the next election. After his expulsion was announced, he released a statement on Twitter saying he had joined the Trillium Party of Ontario. MacLaren stated in an interview with the Toronto Star that he had already planned the week before to announce his move to the Trillium Party at a 3:30pm news conference on May 29, but Brown learned of his plans and expelled him first. Brown said that while there had been rumours of MacLaren leaving to potentially form his own party, Brown personally was unaware of MacLaren's plan to join the Trillium Party until after he found out about the video and expelled him.

In an interview with Evan Solomon on CFRA after his expulsion, MacLaren said that he had grown unhappy with the direction that Brown was taking the party and hadn't spoken to him in a year. MacLaren said that he felt he could serve his constituents better with the Trillium Party, and that the Progressive Conservatives had no values and its establishment was anti-democratic. He also characterized Solomon's questions on the reasoning for his dismissal as "talking about something that isn't helping anybody" and a valueless waste of time.

Since the Trillium Party lacked official party status in the Legislative Assembly of Ontario, MacLaren was officially counted as an independent. In the 2018 election, he lost his bid for re-election in the new riding of Kanata—Carleton, essentially the Ottawa portion of his old riding. He finished fifth out of seven candidates after losing over half of his vote from 2014.

== Electoral record ==
2018 Ontario general election: Kanata—Carleton
Party	Candidate	Votes	%	±%
Progressive Conservative	Merrilee Fullerton	23,089	43.19	–2.39
New Democratic	John Hansen	15,592	29.17	+15.21
Liberal	Stephanie Maghnam	9,090	17.01	–16.35
Green	Andrew West	2,827	5.29	–1.81
Trillium	Jack MacLaren	1,947	3.64	–
Libertarian	Peter D'Entremont	524	0.98	–
None of the Above	Robert Lebrun	384	0.72	–
Total valid votes		53,453	99.22	
Total rejected, unmarked and declined ballots		418	0.78	–
Turnout		53,871	62.32	–
Eligible voters		86,449		
Progressive Conservative notional hold		Swing		▼8.80
Source: Elections Ontario

2014 Ontario general election: Carleton—Mississippi Mills
Party	Candidate	Votes	%	±%
Progressive Conservative	Jack MacLaren	30,590	47.49	–2.80
Liberal	Rosalyn Stevens	20,472	31.78	–2.31
New Democratic	John Hansen	8,744	13.57	+2.23
Green	Andrew West	4,614	7.16	+3.86
Total valid votes		64,420	98.98	
Total rejected, unmarked and declined ballots		664	1.02	+0.66
Turnout		65,084	56.08	+2.59
Eligible voters		116,047		
Progressive Conservative hold		Swing		–0.25
Source: Elections Ontario

2011 Ontario general election: Carleton—Mississippi Mills
Party	Candidate	Votes	%	±%
Progressive Conservative	Jack MacLaren	28,246	50.29	+2.46
Liberal	Megan Cornell	19,144	34.08	+2.15
New Democratic	Liam Duff	6,371	11.34	+3.72
Green	Scott Simser	1,857	3.31	–7.20
Family Coalition	Cyntia Bredfeldt	549	0.98	+0.18
Total valid votes		56,167	99.64	
Total rejected, unmarked and declined ballots		204	0.36	–0.09
Turnout		56,371	53.50	–1.80
Eligible voters		105,368		
Progressive Conservative hold		Swing		+0.16
Source: Elections Ontario
