= Karen McCrimmon =

Canadian politician

Lieutenant Colonel Karen McCrimmon OMM CD MPP
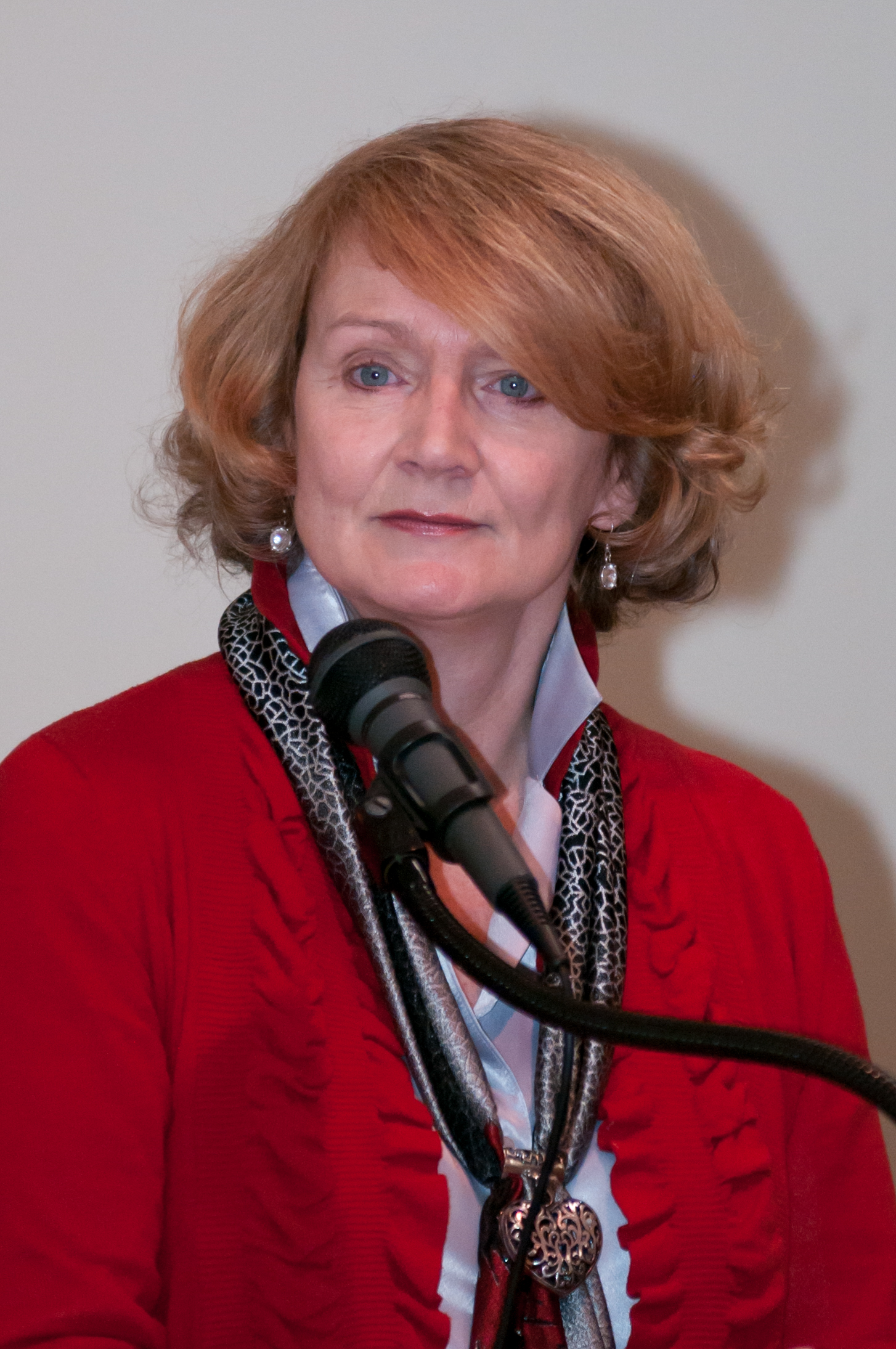
- McCrimmon speaking at a community discussion night, January 28, 2014

Member of the Ontario Provincial Parliament for Kanata—Carleton
- Incumbent
- Assumed office July 27, 2023
- Preceded by: Merrilee Fullerton

Parliamentary Secretary to the Minister of Public Safety and Emergency Preparedness
- In office August 31, 2018 – August 15, 2021
- Minister: Ralph Goodale
- Preceded by: Mark Holland

Parliamentary Secretary to the Minister of Transport
- In office January 30, 2017 – August 31, 2018
- Minister: Marc Garneau
- Preceded by: Kate Young
- Succeeded by: Terry Beech

Parliamentary Secretary to the Minister of Veterans Affairs
- In office December 2, 2015 – January 27, 2017
- Minister: Kent Hehr
- Preceded by: Pierre Lemieux
- Succeeded by: Sherry Romanado

Member of Parliament for Kanata—Carleton
- In office October 19, 2015 – September 20, 2021
- Preceded by: Constituency established
- Succeeded by: Jenna Sudds

Personal details
- Born: Karen A. Martin Weston, Ontario, Canada
- Party: Liberal Party of Canada (federal); Ontario Liberal Party; (provincial)
- Spouse: Rob McCrimmon
- Children: 2
- Education: University of Windsor (BA)
- Profession: Mediator, soldier
- Awards: Order of Military Merit; Canadian Forces' Decoration with clasp

Military service
- Allegiance: Canada
- Branch/service: Canadian Army; Royal Canadian Air Force
- Years of service: 1975–1980 (Army); 1980–2006 (Air Force)
- Rank: Lieutenant-Colonel
- Unit: The Windsor Regiment
- Commands: 429 Transport Squadron
- Battles/wars: Gulf War; Afghanistan War

Karen A. McCrimmon OMM CD MPP (née Martin) is a Canadian Armed Forces veteran, mediator, and politician. She is the member of provincial parliament (MPP) for Kanata—Carleton and was elected in a by-election on July 27, 2023 as a member of the Ontario Liberal Party.

She previously served as the Member of Parliament for Kanata—Carleton from 2015 to 2021. After a 31-year military career, McCrimmon retired as a lieutenant colonel. She was the first female navigator and the first woman to command a Canadian Forces air force squadron.

She became involved in federal politics with the Liberal Party of Canada in 2008. In 2011, McCrimmon was the Liberal candidate for the federal election in the Carleton—Mississippi Mills riding and, in 2013, she unsuccessfully bid for the Liberal leadership. She was first elected to Parliament in the 2015 federal election and re-elected in 2019. She did not seek re-election in 2021, citing health issues. In 2023, McCrimmon was elected to Provincial Parliament in the Kanata-Carleton by-election.

== Background ==
McCrimmon was born in Weston, Ontario. Her father, Charles Martin, was a metallurgic technician employed by the A.V. Roe Company working on the Avro Arrow CF-105 fighter aircraft. Her mother, Isabel, emigrated from Scotland on her own, at the age of 20. When the Arrow project was cancelled in 1959, her father found work with Trans-Canada Airlines and moved his family to Timmins, Ontario. In 1971, the family moved to Windsor, Ontario.

While in high school, McCrimmon joined the Royal Canadian Army Cadets. In 1975, she joined The Windsor Regiment (RCAC) as a Reservist. She graduated with a Bachelor of Arts from the University of Windsor in Russian and linguistics, and originally wanted to work in Canada's diplomatic corps.

McCrimmon then joined the Regular Force in 1980 and became an air navigator, the first woman to gain such a qualification.

In 1995, she was made a member of the Order of Military Merit and, in 1998, was promoted lieutenant-colonel and given command of 429 Transport Squadron, becoming the first woman to command a Canadian Forces flying squadron. In 2000, she headed the Transport and Rescue Standardization and Evaluation Team. In July 2006, she was posted to Ramstein, Germany to serve as a Senior Staff Officer at the NATO Air Headquarters. She did a tour of duty in Afghanistan in 2004 where she was responsible for NATO Airlift Co-ordination. She retired from the Forces in 2006.

== Politics ==
McCrimmon became involved in federal politics with the Liberal Party in 2008. She was the Liberal candidate for the riding of Carleton—Mississippi Mills in the 2011 federal election, but lost to the Conservative incumbent Gordon O'Connor. In December 2012, she announced her bid for the leadership of the Liberal Party of Canada and, on April 14, 2013, she placed sixth, losing to Justin Trudeau.

In the 2015 federal election, McCrimmon was the Liberal candidate in Kanata—Carleton, essentially the Ottawa portion of Carleton—Mississippi Mills. She defeated Conservative candidate Walter Pamic by a 7,600-vote margin as the Liberals swept to a majority government. She was the first Liberal in 48 years to win the riding or its predecessors in the absence of vote-splitting on the right.

McCrimmon was re-elected in 2019, defeating Conservative candidate Justina McCaffrey by a 4,000-vote margin as the Liberals won a minority government. McCrimmon was Chair of the Defence Committee in the 43rd Canadian Parliament.

McCrimmon did not run for re-election in the 2021 federal election. In her August 2021 announcement, she attributed her decision to not seek another term to health issues.

On May 29, 2023, McCrimmon was nominated by the Ontario Liberal Party as their candidate for the 2023 Kanata—Carleton by-election. On July 27, 2023, she won the by-election, flipping a seat that was previously held by the Progressive Conservative Party of Ontario, which had held the riding and its predecessors for decades. She represents much of the same area that she represented federally.

As of July 7, 2024, she serves as the Liberal Party critic for Education, Colleges and Universities.

== Civilian career ==
On November 13, 2015, McCrimmon was sworn in as the Member of Parliament for the riding of Kanata – Carleton. Prior to her election, she was a consultant for private and public institutions and organizations.

Married to Rob McCrimmon since 1985, the couple have two grown children. Karen McCrimmon is a private pilot and is a member of the Women's Executive Network (WXN), CFUW, FMWC, Royal Canadian Legion, and CWIA.

== Honours and decorations ==
McCrimmon received the following honours and decorations during her military career.

Ribbon	Description	Notes
	Order of Military Merit (OMM)	Appointed on September 6, 1995; Invested on December 6, 1995
	Gulf and Kuwait Medal	with Bar
	General Campaign Star	South West Asia Ribbon
	Special Service Medal	
	Canadian Peacekeeping Service Medal	
	Canadian Forces' Decoration (CD)	1 Clasp

== Electoral record ==
2025 Ontario general election: Kanata—Carleton
Party	Candidate	Votes	%	±%
Liberal	Karen McCrimmon	22,811	47.91	+13.26
Progressive Conservative	Scott Phelan	19,353	40.65	+8.46
New Democratic	Dave Belcher	3,419	7.18	–22.36
Green	Jennifer Purdy	1,199	2.52	+1.15
New Blue	Elizabeth Watson	503	1.06	–0.91
Ontario Party	Frank Jakubowski	323	0.68	–
Total valid votes		47,608	99.33	
Total rejected, unmarked and declined ballots		323	0.67	+0.30
Turnout		47,931	50.40	+15.23
Eligible voters		95,098		
Liberal hold		Swing		+2.40
Source: Elections Ontario

Ontario provincial by-election, July 27, 2023: Kanata—Carleton Resignation of Merrilee Fullerton
Party	Candidate	Votes	%	±%	Expenditures
Liberal	Karen McCrimmon	11,214	34.66	+11.24	$83,158
Progressive Conservative	Sean Webster	10,416	32.19	–11.42	$83,028
New Democratic	Melissa Coenraad	9,560	29.54	+5.31	$59,139
New Blue	Jennifer Boudreau	636	1.97	–0.42	$9,996
Green	Steven Warren	442	1.37	–4.13	$12,205
Independent	Josh Rachlis	90	0.28	–	$0
Total valid votes		32,358	99.63		
Total rejected, unmarked and declined ballots		121	0.37	+0.10	
Turnout		32,479	35.17	–16.21	
Eligible voters		92,345			
Liberal gain from Progressive Conservative		Swing		+11.33	
Source: Elections Ontario

2019 Canadian federal election: Kanata—Carleton
Party	Candidate	Votes	%	±%	Expenditures
Liberal	Karen McCrimmon	28,746	43.05	−8.24	$101,971.36
Conservative	Justina McCaffrey	24,361	36.48	−2.73	none listed
New Democratic	Melissa Coenraad	8,317	12.46	+5.64	$17,833.67
Green	Jennifer Purdy	4,387	6.57	+3.88	$15,580.62
People's	Scott Miller	961	1.44		$0.00
Total valid votes/expense limit		66,772	99.35		
Total rejected ballots		438	0.65	+0.35	
Turnout		67,210	77.00	−1.96	
Eligible voters		87,281			
Liberal hold		Swing		−2.76	
Source: Elections Canada

2015 Canadian federal election: Kanata—Carleton
Party	Candidate	Votes	%	±%	Expenditures
Liberal	Karen McCrimmon	32,447	51.24	+24.78	–
Conservative	Walter Pamic	24,829	39.21	-14.5	–
New Democratic	John Hansen	4,313	6.81	-8.48	–
Green	Andrew West	1,704	2.69	-1.85	–
Total valid votes/Expense limit		63,323	100		$212,958.74
Total rejected ballots		191	–	–	
Turnout		63,514	–	–	
Eligible voters		79,831			
Liberal notional gain from Conservative		Swing		+19.64	
Source: Elections Canada

2011 Canadian federal election: Carleton—Mississippi Mills
Party	Candidate	Votes	%	±%	Expenditures
Conservative	Gordon O'Connor	43,723	56.95	-0.82	–
Liberal	Karen McCrimmon	18,393	23.96	+1.62	–
New Democratic	Erin Peters	11,223	14.62	+4.98	–
Green	John Hogg	3,434	4.47	-5.76	–
Total valid votes/Expense limit		76,773	100.00		–
Total rejected ballots		196	0.25	–	
Turnout		76,969	72.77	+3.61	
Eligible voters		105,770	–	–	
Conservative hold		Swing		-1.22	
