= Trillium Party of Ontario =

Defunct provincial political party in Ontario, Canada

Trillium Party of Ontario Parti Trillium de l’Ontario
- Leader: Bob Yaciuk
- Founded: 2014
- Dissolved: 2021
- Headquarters: 95 Cousins Drive; Aurora, Ontario
- Membership (2017): 1,200–1,400
- Ideology: Social conservatism Right-wing populism Direct democracy
- Political position: Right-wing
- Colours: Purple
- Seats in Legislature: 0 / 124

Website
- www.trilliumontario.ca

The Trillium Party of Ontario (French: Parti Trillium de l’Ontario) was a right-wing populist, social conservative political party in the Canadian province of Ontario. Founded in 2014, the party was led by Bob Yaciuk for the duration of its existence.

== History ==
First contesting the 2014 General Election, the Trillium Party ran two candidates and received 397 votes.

The Trillium Party gained its first member of the Legislative Assembly of Ontario after Jack MacLaren, the Progressive Conservative MPP for Carleton—Mississippi Mills announced he had joined the party on May 28, 2017, after being removed from the PC caucus for making negative remarks about Francophones in Ontario. Since the Trillium Party lacked official party status, MacLaren was listed as an independent by the Legislature.

Following MacLaren's defection, the Trillium Party saw an increase in media attention as this marked the first time a party other than the Liberals, Progressive Conservatives, or New Democrats had maintained representation at Queen's Park since Robert Wayne Gibson sat as a Liberal-Labour MPP for Kenora in 1966. At the time of MacLaren's defection, party leader Bob Yaciuk informed the media the party had "between 1,200 and 1,400 members". The party's brief presence at Queen's Park ended when MacLaren, running in the new riding of Kanata—Carleton, was unseated at the 2018 provincial election.

Following the 2018 election, the party remained active online only briefly. After expressing support for the Yellow Vest and "United We Roll" protests, the party's website stopped being updated. After failing to submit financial returns after 2021, the party was deregistered by Elections Ontario.

== Policies ==
The Trillium Party's platform focused on health care, education policy, and policing.

Trillium Party policy called for monthly health care statements, a reduction in time between application and granting of practising licences for medical professionals from overseas, involving parents in education issues, and increasing financial support for police. Additional policies included introducing legislation on referendums, addressing corruption through the office of the Auditor General, implementing whistle-blower protection legislation, allowing free votes by MPPs in the legislature, and opposing updates to the province's sexual education curriculum.

== Former Trillium Party MLAs ==
| Member | District | Tenure | Notes |
|---|---|---|---|
| Jack MacLaren | Carleton—Mississippi Mills | 2017–2018 | Previously served as a PC MPP from 2011–2017. |

== Election results ==
Election results
| Election year | No. of overall votes | % of overall total | No. of candidates who ran | No. of seats won | +/− | Government |
|---|---|---|---|---|---|---|
| 2014 | 397 | 0.01 | 2 / 107 | 0 / 107 | New Party | Extra-parliamentary |
| 2018 | 8,178 | 0.14 | 26 / 124 | 0 / 124 | +0.13 | Extra-parliamentary |

In the 2014 provincial election, the Trillium Party nominated two candidates: party leader Bob Yaciuk in Newmarket-Aurora and Gennady Vilensky in Oak Ridges—Markham. In total, the party won a total of 397 votes.
