= List of Green Party of Ontario candidates =

This is a list of previous Green Party of Ontario candidates by election.

- Green Party of Ontario candidates in the 1990 Ontario provincial election
- Green Party of Ontario candidates in the 1995 Ontario provincial election
- Green Party of Ontario candidates in the 1999 Ontario provincial election
- Green Party of Ontario candidates in the 2003 Ontario provincial election
- Green Party of Ontario candidates in the 2007 Ontario provincial election
- Green Party of Ontario candidates in the 2011 Ontario provincial election
- Green Party of Ontario candidates in the 2014 Ontario provincial election
- Green Party of Ontario candidates in the 2018 Ontario provincial election
