= Michael Fenton =

Michael or Micky Fenton may refer to:

- Michael Fenton (politician) (1789–1874), colonial Tasmania politician, first Speaker of the Tasmanian House of Assembly
- Micky Fenton (1913–2003), England international footballer for Middlesbrough
- Michael Fenton, see Green Party of Ontario candidates, 1995 Ontario provincial election
- Micky Fenton (jockey) (born 1972), jockey
