= Young Greens of Ontario =

- Abbreviation: YGO
- Governing body: Co-presidents
- Founder: Green Party of Ontario
- Founded: January 1, 2017
- Ideology: Environmentalist Moderate - Progressive
- Regional affiliation: Ontario
- Slogan: Young Greens make a difference

Website
- https://gpo.ca/young-greens/

The Young Greens of Ontario is the youth wing of the Green Party of Ontario. The organization consists of Green Party of Ontario members who are ages 30 years or younger, and sends two representatives to the highest governing body in the party, the Provincial Executive.

The organization operates campus clubs out of post-secondary institutions in Ontario. Campus clubs exist at the University of Guelph, the University of Ottawa, and Brock University.
