= Green Party of Ontario candidates in the 1999 Ontario provincial election =

The Green Party of Ontario ran 58 candidates in the 1999 provincial election, none of whom were elected. Some of these candidates have their own biography pages; information about others may be found here.

== Candidates ==
=== Hamilton West: Phyllis McColl ===
McColl was 56 years old at the time of the election, and had recently retired from a teaching position at Mohawk College (Hamilton Spectator, 1 June 1999). She received 495 votes (1.20%), finishing fourth against New Democratic Party candidate David Christopherson.

=== Peterborough: Larry Tyldsley ===
Larry Tyldsley is an activist, director, and producer. He became active with the social justice movement in Central America in the 1980s, and later started a shelter for street alcoholics, worked as a community education coordinator in Ottawa, and served as executive director of the New Canadians Centre in Peterborough. He later produced a documentary film entitled, Searching for Buddha. He has been a Green Party candidate in two provincial elections.

When attending the Green Party's 1997 convention, Tyldsley mentioned that he no longer owned a car due to the pollution and social costs associated with automobile use. In 2001, he accused the government of British Columbia Premier Gordon Campbell of promoting environmentally harmful practices through its taxation policies. He has also written in support of the Canadian Firearms Registry.

Electoral record
Election	Division	Party	Votes	%	Place	Winner
1995 provincial	Ottawa East	Green	335	1.32	4/6	Bernard Grandmaître, Liberal
1999 provincial	Peterborough	Green	598	1.10	4/7	Gary Stewart, Progressive Conservative

=== St. Catharines: Doug Woodard ===
Woodard was born in Alberta in 1942, and was raised in Quebec. He is now retired, and is a resident of St. Catharines. Woodard is a contributor to the Babble.ca forum, where he has written a number of articles advocating the single transferable vote.

He has been a member of the Green Party for most of the time since 1984. He received 215 votes (0.46%) in 1999, finishing fifth against Liberal candidate Jim Bradley.

=== Trinity—Spadina: Sat K. Singh Khalsa ===
Khalsa was a frequent candidate for the provincial and federal Green Parties in the 1990s. He is a co-founder of Toronto's Local Employment and Trading System (LETS), which distributes GreenDollars as local barter (Toronto Star, 28 March 1992), and was listed as a LETS administrator in 1993 (Toronto Star, 20 June 1993). During the 1993 federal election, he promised to donate half his parliamentary salary to community groups if elected (Toronto Star, 22 October 1993).

Khalsa described himself as a househusband during the 1997 federal election (Toronto Star, 30 May 1997) and has called for greater democracy within the family unit, encouraging greater respect between parents and children (Toronto Star, 6 June 1996). In a 1990 forum on Toronto police services, he advocated that Toronto officers be renamed as "peace officers", and only be permitted to draw their guns to defend themselves (Toronto Star, 5 November 1990).

Electoral record
Election	Division	Party	Votes	%	Place	Winner
provincial by-election, 1 April 1993	Don Mills	Green	141		8/8	David Johnson, Progressive Conservative
1993 federal	Davenport	Green	254		7/10	Tony Ianno, Liberal
1997 federal	Trinity—Spadina	Green	392		5/10	Tony Ianno, Liberal
1999 provincial	Trinity—Spadina	Green	612	1.71	4/8	Rosario Marchese, New Democratic Party

=== Windsor West: Timothy Dugdale ===
Dugdale is a writer and academic, and lived in Windsor at the time of the 1990 election. He has a Master of Arts degree in Communication Studies from the University of Windsor, and a Ph.D. from Wayne State University in Michigan, USA. His dissertation was entitled, ""Telling It Like It Was?!" Discursive Strategies In Star/Celebrity (Auto)Biographies - Jackie Byars, director".

He campaigned for the Green Party of Canada in the 1997 federal election, and received 357 votes for a fifth-place finish in Windsor—St. Clair. The winner was Shaughnessy Cohen of the Liberal Party. In the same year, he unsuccessfully campaigned for mayor of Windsor.

He received 420 votes (1.13%) in the 1999 election, finishing fourth against Liberal incumbent Sandra Pupatello. He newspaper report from this period lists him as a communications instructor at the University of Windsor. Dugdale claimed he would run as a "Blue Green", fiscally conservative and socially liberal (Windsor Star, 27 January 1999).

Dugdale was Press Manager and Head Graphic Designer of the University of Detroit Mercy Press from 2001 to 2004, when he founded Atomic Quill Media. He now teaches English at Detroit Mercy, and has published two books: "Requiem for Oblivion" and "I Couldn't Care Less".

He also operates his own website, available.
