= Green Party of Ontario candidates in the 1990 Ontario provincial election =

The Green Party of Ontario fielded several candidates in the 1990 provincial election, none of whom were elected. Information about these candidates may be found here.

== Brent Monkley (Hamilton Centre) ==
Monkley received 605 votes (2.39%), finishing fourth against New Democratic Party candidate David Christopherson. As of 2006, an individual named Brent Monkley is listed as a vice-principal of Hill Park Secondary School in Hamilton. This is likely the same person.

== Philip Sarazen (York South) ==
Sarazen is a welder, artist and inventor, and has been a frequent candidate for public office. He was once a member of the Communist Party of Canada - Marxist-Leninist, and ran under the party's banner in an Ottawa riding during the 1974 federal election. He placed second at the Quebec Inventor's Competition in 1985, after creating a greenhouse system for apartment balconies. In 1988, he designed a magnetic wallet to hold Canada's newly minted dollar coins. He moved to Toronto later in the same year, and ran for the Green Party of Canada in the 1988 election campaign.

Sarazen was 41 years old in the 1990 provincial campaign, and spoke against Ontario Hydro's plan to construct ten nuclear reactors over the next decade. He argued that the dangers posed by nuclear energy were being ignored by the major parties. He later campaigned for the Metro Toronto Separate School Board in 1991, arguing that students should be taught how culture shapes economy. During the early 1990s, he helped to form "Cobblestone", a theatre company made up of homeless people.

Sarazen designed a vehicle called the "Subtonic Cycle" in 1996, and announced plans to ride it through Bosnia as an absurdist art display. The Globe and Mail described the device as a "rainbow-coloured jungle gym of discarded wrought iron welded into an outlandish Dr. Seuss-like contraption topped by a colossal wire umbrella and powered by a unicycle", adding that "one rider pedals [while] a grab bag of musicians (the Subtonic Monks) ride, playing improvisational rhythms". The Bosnia shows took place in 1997, and the Subtonic Cycle was later displayed at many events in Ontario. Sarazen later created follow-up contraptions called "Zoosse Mobiles", in an apparent homage to Dr. Seuss.

Sarazen became homeless in the early 2000s, and lived in Toronto's "Tent City" for a time. As of November 2006, he lives in Parkdale and designs handmade bicycle racks.

Electoral record
Election	Division	Party	Votes	%	Place	Winner
1974 federal	Ottawa Centre	Marxist-Leninist	62		7/7	Hugh Poulin, Liberal
1988 federal	St. Paul's	Green	348		4/6	Barbara McDougall, Progressive Conservative
1990 provincial	York South	Green	453	1.82	5/5	Bob Rae, New Democratic Party
1991 municipal	Metro Toronto Separate School Board, Ward Four	n/a	642		2/2	Owen O'Reilly
provincial by-election, 1 April 1993	St. George—St. David	Green	209		5/9	Tim Murphy, Liberal
