= Green Party of Ontario leadership elections =

The Green Party of Ontario has held three leadership elections.

== 1993 ==
- Frank de Jong was elected over Jim Harris

== 2001 ==
- Incumbent Frank de Jong was elected over deputy GPO leader Judy Greenwood-Speers

== 2009 ==
- GPO policy director Mike Schreiner was elected over "none of the above"
