= Candidates of the 2018 Ontario general election =

- June 7, 2018

The following are the candidates who ran in the 2018 Ontario general election, that was held on June 7, 2018.

For results see 2018 Ontario general election#Results

== Abbreviations guide ==
Abbreviations of political parties used in these tables:

- All – Ontario Alliance
- CAP: Cultural Action Party of Ontario
- CCP – Canadians' Choice Party
- Comm. – Communist Party of Canada (Ontario)
- CO - Consensus Ontario
- CoR - Confederation of Regions Party of Ontario
- FPO – Freedom Party of Ontario
- Green – Green Party of Ontario
- Ind. – Independent
- Liberal – Ontario Liberal Party
- Libert. – Ontario Libertarian Party
- Mod. – Ontario Moderate Party
- N. Ont – Northern Ontario Party
- NDP – Ontario New Democratic Party
- NOTA – None of the Above Party
- NPCP - New Peoples' Choice Party
- Ont - Ontario Party
- PC – Progressive Conservative Party of Ontario
- P – The Peoples Political Party
- PSN – Party for People with Special Needs
- SCC – Stop Climate Change
- SNSA – Stop the New Sex-Ed Agenda
- SRP - Social Reform Party of Ontario
- T – Trillium Party of Ontario

== Number of candidates by party ==
Nominated candidates for the 2018 Ontario general election
Party	Leader	Candidates
Ontario Alliance	Joshua E. Eriksen	3
Canadians' Choice Party	Bahman Yazdanfar	5
Communist Party of Canada (Ontario)	Dave McKee	12
Consensus Ontario	Brad Harness	10
Canadian Economic Party	Patrick Knight	2
Cultural Action Party	Arthur Smitherman	3
Freedom Party of Ontario	Paul McKeever	14
Green Party of Ontario	Mike Schreiner	124
Ontario Liberal Party	Kathleen Wynne	124
Ontario Libertarian Party	Allen Small	117
Ontario Moderate Party	Yuri Duboisky	16
Multicultural Party of Ontario	Wasyl Luczkiw	2
New People's Choice Party	Daryl Christoff	3
Northern Ontario Party	Trevor Holliday	10
Ontario New Democratic Party	Andrea Horwath	124
None of the Above Party	Greg Vezina	42
Ontario Party	Jason Tysick	5
Party of Objective Truth	Derrick Matthews	2
Progressive Conservative Party of Ontario	Doug Ford	124
Ontario Provincial Confederation of Regions Party	vacant	2
Pauper Party of Ontario	John Turmel	2
The Peoples Political Party	Troy Young	6
Party for People with Special Needs	Hilton Milan	5
Social Reform Party	Abu Alam	2
Stop Climate Change	Ken Ranney	2
Stop the New Sex-Ed Agenda	Queenie Yu	3
Trillium Party of Ontario	Bob Yaciuk	26
Go Vegan	Paul Figueiras	2
Independent		32
Total		824

== Candidates ==
◊ = Not seeking re-election
‡ = Running for re-election in different riding
Bolded candidates represent party leaders
Source: Elections Ontario

=== East ===
==== Ottawa ====
Electoral district	Candidates							Incumbent
Electoral district	Liberal	PC	NDP	Green	Libertarian	NOTA	Others	Incumbent
Carleton	Theresa Qadri	Goldie Ghamari	Courtney Potter	Gordan Kubanek	Jean-Serge Brisson	Evan Nightingale	Mark Dickson (Ind.); Kevin Harris (CAP); **Jay Tysick** (Ont.)	New District
Kanata—Carleton	Stephanie Maghnam	Merrilee Fullerton	John Hansen	Andrew West	Peter D'Entremont	Robert LeBrun	Jack MacLaren (T)	Jack MacLaren; Carleton—Mississippi Mills
Nepean	Lovina Srivastava	Lisa MacLeod	Zaff Ansari	James O'Grady	Mark A. Snow	Raphael Louis	**Derrick Lionel Matthews** (POT)	Lisa MacLeod; Nepean—Carleton
Orléans	Marie-France Lalonde	Cameron Montgomery	Barbara Zarboni	Nicholas Lapierre	Gerald Bourdeau		Samuel Schwisberg (Ind.)	Marie-France Lalonde; Ottawa—Orléans
Ottawa Centre	Yasir Naqvi	Colleen McCleery	Joel Harden	Cherie Wong	Bruce A. Faulkner	Marc Adornato	Stuart Ryan (Comm.); James Sears (CCP)	Yasir Naqvi
Ottawa South	John Fraser	Karin Howard	Eleanor Fast	Les Schram	Robert Daigneault		Larry Wasslen (Comm.)	John Fraser
Ottawa—Vanier	Nathalie Des Rosiers	Fadi Nemr	Lyra Evans	Sheilagh McLean	Ken Lewis	Keegan Bennett	David McGruer (FPO)	Nathalie Des Rosiers
Ottawa West—Nepean	Bob Chiarelli	Jeremy Roberts	Chandra Pasma	Pat Freel	Nicholas Paliga	Colin A. Pritchard		Bob Chiarelli

==== Eastern Ontario ====
Electoral district	Candidates						Incumbent
Electoral district	Liberal	PC	NDP	Green	Libertarian	Other	Incumbent
Bay of Quinte	Robert Quaiff	Todd Smith	Joanne Bélanger	Mark Daye	Cindy Davidson	Paul Bordonaro (Ind.); James Engelsman (T)	Todd Smith; Prince Edward—Hastings
Glengarry—Prescott—Russell	Pierre Leroux	Amanda Simard	Bonnie Jean-Louis	Daniel Reid	Darcy Neal Donnelly	Joël Charbonneau (Ont.)	Grant Crack ◊
Hastings—Lennox and Addington	Tim Rigby	Daryl Kramp	Nate Smelle	Sari Watson	Greg Scholfield	Lonnie Herrington (T)	New District
Kingston and the Islands	Sophie Kiwala	Gary Bennett	Ian Arthur	Robert Kiley	Heather Cunningham	Andre Imbeault (T)	Sophie Kiwala
Lanark—Frontenac—Kingston	Amanda Pulker-Mok	Randy Hillier	Ramsey Hart	Anita Payne	Steve Gebhardt	John McEwen (Ind.)	Randy Hillier; Lanark—Frontenac—Lennox and Addington
Leeds—Grenville—Thousand Islands and Rideau Lakes	David Henderson	Steve Clark	Michelle Taylor	Derek Morley	Bill Buckley		Steve Clark; Leeds—Grenville
Renfrew—Nipissing—Pembroke	Jackie Agnew	John Yakabuski	Ethel LaValley	Anna Dolan	Jesse Wood	Murray Reid (CoR)	John Yakabuski
Stormont—Dundas—South Glengarry	Heather Megill	Jim McDonell	Marc Benoit	Elaine Kennedy	Sabile Trimm		Jim McDonell

=== Central Ontario ===
Electoral district	Candidates						Incumbent
Electoral district	Liberal	PC	NDP	Green	Libertarian	Other	Incumbent
Barrie—Innisfil	Ann Hoggarth	Andrea Khanjin	Pekka Reinio	Bonnie North	Brett Dorion	Alexander Ryzhykh (Mod.); Stacey Surkova (T); Jake Tucker (CCP)	Ann Hoggarth; Barrie
Barrie—Springwater—Oro-Medonte	Jeff Kerk	Doug Downey	Dan Janssen	Keenan Aylwin	Mark Mitchell	Ram Faerber (Ind.); Darren Roskam (NOTA); Michael Tuck (Ind.)	New District
Bruce—Grey—Owen Sound	Francesca Dobbyn	Bill Walker	Karen Gventer	Don Marshall	Jay Miller	Janice Kaikkonen (CO); Enos Martin (All.); Elizabeth Liz Marshall (T)	Bill Walker
Dufferin—Caledon	Bob Gordanier	Sylvia Jones	Andrea Mullarkey	Laura Campbell	Jeff Harris	Stephen McKendrick (CO); C. Andrew Nowell (T)	Sylvia Jones
Haliburton—Kawartha Lakes—Brock	Brooklynne Cramp-Waldinsperger	Laurie Scott	Zac Miller	Lynn Therien	Gene Balfour	Chuck MacMillan (CO); Thomas Rhyno (NOTA)	Laurie Scott
Northumberland—Peterborough South	Lou Rinaldi	David Piccini	Jana Papuckoski	Jeff Wheeldon	John O'Keefe	Paul Cragg (SCC); Derek Sharp (T)	Lou Rinaldi; Northumberland—Quinte West
Peterborough—Kawartha	Jeff Leal	Dave Smith	Sean Conway	Gianne Broughton	Jacob William Currier	Ken Ranney (SCC); Robert Roddick (T)	Jeff Leal; Peterborough
Simcoe—Grey	Dan Hambly	Jim Wilson	David Matthews	Jesseca Perry	John Wright		Jim Wilson
Simcoe North	Gerry Marshall	Jill Dunlop	Elizabeth Van Houtte	Valerie Powell	Cynthia Sneath		Patrick Brown ◊
York—Simcoe	Loralea Carruthers	Caroline Mulroney	Dave Szollosy	Alexandra Zalucky	Ioan Silviu Druma-Strugariu	Franco Colavecchia (Mod.)	Julia Munro ◊

=== 905 Belt ===
==== Durham ====
Electoral district	Candidates						Incumbent
Electoral district	Liberal	PC	NDP	Green	Libertarian	Other	Incumbent
Ajax	Joe Dickson	Rod Phillips	Monique Hughes	Stephen Leahy	Marsha Haynes	Kevin Brackley (Ind.); Frank Lopez (NOTA)	Joe Dickson; Ajax—Pickering
Durham	Granville Anderson	Lindsey Park	Joel Usher	Michelle Corbett	Ryan Robinson		Granville Anderson
Oshawa	Makini Smith	Bob Chapman	Jennifer French	Deborah Ellis	Jeanne Gory	Cheryl Kelly (NOTA)	Jennifer French
Pickering—Uxbridge	Ibrahim Daniyal	Peter Bethlenfalvy	Nerissa Cariño	Adam Narraway	Brendan Reilly	Netalia Duboisky (Mod.); Michelle Francis (N/A); William Myers (Ind.); Eric Sivadas (Ind.)	Tracy MacCharles ◊ Pickering—Scarborough East
Whitby	Leisa Washington	Lorne Coe	Niki Lundquist	Stacey Leadbetter	Ronald Halabi	Doug Thom (FPO)	Lorne Coe; Whitby—Oshawa

==== Peel ====
Electoral district	Candidates							Incumbent
Electoral district	Liberal	PC	NDP	Green	Libertarian	NOTA	Other	Incumbent
Brampton Centre	Safdar Hussain	Harjit Jaswal	Sara Singh	Laila Zarrabi Yan	Andrew Hosie	Mehdi Pakzad	Bill Oprel (T)	New District
Brampton East	Parminder Singh	Sudeep Verma	Gurratan Singh	Raquel Fronte	Daniele Cerasoli		Gurdeep Dhothar (T)	Vacant (Note: formerly Jagmeet Singh); Bramalea—Gore—Malton
Brampton North	Harinder Malhi	Ripudaman Dhillon	Kevin Yarde	Pauline Thornham	Gregory Argue			Harinder Malhi; Brampton—Springdale
Brampton South	Sukhwant Thethi	Prabmeet Sarkaria	Paramjit Gill	Lindsay Falt	Brian Watson		John Grant (T); Ted Harlson (FPO)	New District
Brampton West	Vic Dhillon	Amarjot Sandhu	Jagroop Singh	Julie Guillemet-Ackerman	David Shaw		Surjit Sahota (Comm.)	Vic Dhillon
Mississauga Centre	Bobbie Daid	Natalia Kusendova	Laura Kaminker	Noah Gould	Farouk Giga		Viktor Chornopyskyy (Mod.); Alex Pacis (SNSEA)	New District
Mississauga East—Cooksville	Dipika Damerla	Kaleed Rasheed	Tom Takacs	Basia Krzyzanowski	Mark Donaldson	Leonard Little	Mykola Ponomarenko (Mod.)	Dipika Damerla
Mississauga—Erin Mills	Imran Mian	Sheref Sabawy	Farina Hassan	Libby Yuill	Pieter Liem	Grzegorz Nowacki	Ben Skura (FPO)	Harinder Takhar ◊ Mississauga—Erindale
Mississauga—Lakeshore	Charles Sousa	Rudy Cuzzetto	Boris Rosolak	Lloyd Jones	Jay Ward	Kenny Robinson	Felicia Trigiani (Vegan)	Charles Sousa; Mississauga South
Mississauga—Malton	Amrit Mangat	Deepak Anand	Nikki Clarke	Eryn Sylvester	Michelle Ciupka	Alex Vezina	Caroline Roach (Ind.)	Amrit Mangat; Mississauga—Brampton South
Mississauga—Streetsville	Bob Delaney	Nina Tangri	Jacqueline Gujarati	Abhijeet Manay	Richard Levesque	**Greg Vezina**		Bob Delaney

==== York ====
Electoral district	Candidates						Incumbent
Electoral district	Liberal	PC	NDP	Green	Libertarian	Other	Incumbent
Aurora—Oak Ridges—Richmond Hill	Naheed Yaqubian	Michael Parsa	Katrina Sale	Stephanie Duncan	Serge Korovitsyn	Abu Alam (SRP); Margarita Barsky (Mod.); Jenusz Butylkin (FPO); Santiago DeSilva (NOTA)	New District
King—Vaughan	Marilyn Iafrate	Stephen Lecce	Andrea Beal	Greg Locke	Yan Simkin	Tatiana Babitch (Mod.); Roman Evtukh (T)	New District
Markham—Stouffville	Helena Jaczek	Paul Calandra	Kingsley Kwok	Jose Etcheverry	Paul Balfour	Yuri Duboisky (Mod.)	Helena Jaczek; Oak Ridges—Markham
Markham—Thornhill	Juanita Nathan	Logan Kanapathi	Cindy Hackelberg	Caryn Bergmann	David Nadler	Jeff Kuah (Ind.)	New District
Markham—Unionville	Amanda Yeung Collucci	Billy Pang	Sylvie David	Deborah Moolman	**Allen Small**	Anastasia Afonina (Mod.)	Michael Chan ◊
Newmarket—Aurora	Chris Ballard	Christine Elliott	Melissa Williams	Michelle Bourdeau	Lori Robbins	Dorian Baxter (Ind.); Denis Gorlynskiy (Mod.); Denis Van Decker (NOTA); **Bob Yaciuk** (T)	Chris Ballard
Richmond Hill	Reza Moridi	Daisy Wai	Marco Coletta	Walter Bauer	Igor Bily		Reza Moridi
Thornhill	Sabi Ahsan	Gila Martow	Ezra Tanen	Rachel Dokhoian	Mike Holmes	Aleksei Polyakov (Mod.); Above Znoneofthe (NOTA)	Gila Martow
Vaughan—Woodbridge	Steven Del Duca	Michael Tibollo	Sandra Lozano	Michael DiPasquale	Paolo Fabrizio		Steven Del Duca; Vaughan

=== Toronto ===
==== Scarborough ====
Electoral district	Candidates							Incumbent
Electoral district	Liberal	PC	NDP	Green	Libertarian	Trillium	Other	Incumbent
Scarborough—Agincourt	Soo Wong	Aris Babikian	Tasleem Riaz	Lydia West	Mark Sinclair	Carlos Lacuna	Rubina Ansary (Mod.); Jude Coutinho (Ind.); Badih Rawdah (P)	Soo Wong
Scarborough Centre	Mazhar Shafiq	Christina Mitas	Zeyd Bismilla	Sanjin Zeco	Matthew Dougherty	Chris Mellor		Brad Duguid ◊
Scarborough—Guildwood	Mitzie Hunter	Roshan Nallaratnam	Tom Packwood	Linda Rice	Hamid-Reza Dehnad-Tabatabaei	George Garvida	Heather Dunbar (P); Benjamin Mbaegbu (N/A); Wanda Ryan (PSN)	Mitzie Hunter
Scarborough North	Chin Lee	Raymond Cho	Dwayne Morgan	Nicole Peltier	Sean Morgan			Raymond Cho; Scarborough—Rouge River
Scarborough—Rouge Park	Sumi Shan	Vijay Thanigasalam	Felicia Samuel	Priyan De Silva	Todd Byers	Amit Pitamber		New District
Scarborough Southwest	Lorenzo Berardinetti	Gary Ellis	Doly Begum	David Del Grande	James Speirs	Bobby Turley	Allen Atkinson (NOTA); Willie Little (PSN)	Lorenzo Berardinetti

==== North York and North Toronto ====
Electoral district	Candidates						Incumbent
Electoral district	Liberal	PC	NDP	Green	Libertarian	Other	Incumbent
Don Valley East	Michael Coteau	Denzil Minnan-Wong	Khalid Ahmed	Mark Wong	Justin Robinson	Wayne Simmons (FPO)	Michael Coteau
Don Valley North	Shelley Carroll	Vincent Ke	Akil Sadikali	Janelle Yanishewski	Sarah Matthews	Alexander Verstraten (NOTA)	New District
Don Valley West	**Kathleen Wynne**	Jon Kieran	Amara Possian	Morgan Bailey	John Kittredge	Patrick Knight (CEP)	**Kathleen Wynne**
Eglinton—Lawrence	Michael Colle	Robin Martin	Robyn Vilde	Reuben DeBoer	Michael Staffieri	Lionel Poizner (T)	Michael Colle
Willowdale	David Zimmer	Stan Cho	Saman Tabasinejad	Randi Ramdeen	Catherine MacDonald-Robertson	Birinder Ahluwalia (Ind.)	David Zimmer
York Centre	Ramon Estaris	Roman Baber	Andrea Vásquez Jiménez	Roma Lyon	Benjamin Kamminga	Cherie Ann Day (NOTA); Alexander Leonov (Mod.)	Monte Kwinter ◊

==== Toronto and East York ====
Electoral district	Candidates						Incumbent
Electoral district	Liberal	PC	NDP	Green	Libertarian	Other	Incumbent
Beaches—East York	Arthur Potts	Sarah Mallo	Rima Berns-McGown	Debra Scott	Thomas Armstrong	Andrew Balodis (Ind.); Eric Brazau (CAP); Tony Chipman (P); Regina Mundrugo (PSN); Joe Ring (NOTA); **Bahman Yazdanfar** (CCP)	Arthur Potts
Davenport	Cristina Martins	Federico Sanchez	Marit Stiles	Kirsten Snider	Nunzio Venuto	Franz Cauchi (FPO); Chai Kalevar (N/A); **Dave McKee** (Comm.); Troy J. Young (P)	Cristina Martins
Parkdale—High Park	Nadia Guerrera	Adam Pham	Bhutila Karpoche	Halyna Zalucky	Matthias Nunno	Jay Watts (Comm.)	Vacant (Note: formerly Cheri DiNovo)
Spadina—Fort York	Han Dong	Iris Yu	Chris Glover	Rita Bilerman	Erik Malmholt	Adam Nobody (NOTA); Queenie Yu (SNSA)	Han Dong; Trinity—Spadina
Toronto Centre	David Morris	Meredith Cartwright	Suze Morrison	Adam Sommerfeld	Judi Falardeau	**Kevin Clarke** (P); Wanda Fountain (CEP); Cameron James (NPCP); Dan King (PSN); Theresa Snell (SNSA)	Vacant (Note: formerly Glen Murray)
Toronto—Danforth	Li Koo	Patricia Kalligosfyris	Peter Tabuns	Andrew Trotter	Paul Layton	Ivan Byard (Comm.); John Kladitis (Ind.); John Richardson (Ind.)	Peter Tabuns
Toronto—St. Paul's	Jess Spindler	Andrew Kirsch	Jill Andrew	Teresa Pun	Jekiah Dunavant	Marina Doshchitsina (Mod.)	Vacant (Note: formerly Eric Hoskins); St. Paul's
University—Rosedale	Jo-Ann Davis	Gillian Smith	Jessica Bell	Tim Grant	Ryan Swim	**Daryl Christoff** (NPCP); **Paulo Figueiras** (Vegan); Doug MacLeod (Ind.); **Hilton Milan** (PSN)	New District

==== Etobicoke and York ====
Electoral district	Candidates						Incumbent
Electoral district	Liberal	PC	NDP	Green	Libertarian	Other	Incumbent
Etobicoke Centre	Yvan Baker	Kinga Surma	Erica Kelly	Shawn Rizvi	Basil Mummery	Paul Fromm (CCP); Wallace Richards (Ind.)	Yvan Baker
Etobicoke—Lakeshore	Peter Milczyn	Christine Hogarth	Phil Trotter	Chris Caldwell	Mark Wrzesniewski	Ian Lytvyn (Mod.)	Peter Milczyn
Etobicoke North	Shafiq Qaadri	**Doug Ford**	Mahamud Amin	Nancy Kaur Ghuman	Brianne Lefebvre		Shafiq Qaadri
Humber River—Black Creek	Deanna Sgro	Cyma Musarat	Tom Rakocevic	Kirsten Bennett	Jennifer Ochoa	Scott Aitchison (CO); Lucy Guerrero (T)	Mario Sergio ◊ York West
York South—Weston	Laura Albanese	Mark DeMontis	Faisal Hassan	Grad Murray	Bonnie Hu		Laura Albanese

=== Hamilton, Halton and Niagara ===
==== Halton ====
Electoral district	Candidates							Incumbent
Electoral district	Liberal	PC	NDP	Green	Libertarian	NOTA	Other	Incumbent
Burlington	Eleanor McMahon	Jane McKenna	Andrew Drummond	Vince Fiorito	Jim Gilchrist	Nadine Bentham	Peter Rusin (CO)	Eleanor McMahon
Milton	Indira Naidoo-Harris	Parm Gill	Brendan Smyth	Eleanor Hayward	Benjamin Cunningham		Enam Ahmed (SRP)	Indira Naidoo-Harris; Halton
Oakville	Kevin Flynn	Stephen Crawford	Lesley Sprague	Emily DeSousa	Spencer Oklobdzija			Kevin Flynn
Oakville North—Burlington	Alvin Tedjo	Effie Triantafilopoulos	Saima Zaidi	Marianne Workman	Charles Zach		Frank DeLuca (T)	New District

==== Hamilton ====
Electoral district	Candidates							Incumbent
Electoral district	Liberal	PC	NDP	Green	Libertarian	NOTA	Other	Incumbent
Flamborough—Glanbrook	Judi Partridge	Donna Skelly	Melissa McGlashan	Janet Errygers	Glenn Langton	Rudy Miller	Roman Sarachman (T)	New District
Hamilton Centre	Deirdre Pike	Dionne Duncan	**Andrea Horwath**	Jason Lopez	Robert Young	Tony Lemma	Maria Anastasiou (Ind.); Mary Ellen Campbell (Comm.)	Andrea Horwath
Hamilton East—Stoney Creek	Jennifer Stebbing	Akash Grewal	Paul Miller	Brian Munroe	Allan DeRoo	Linda Chenoweth	Lucina Monroy (NPCP)	Paul Miller
Hamilton Mountain	Damin Starr	Esther Pauls	Monique Taylor	David Urquhart	Kristofer Maves	Scott Miller		Monique Taylor
Hamilton West—Ancaster—Dundas	Ted McMeekin	Ben Levitt	Sandy Shaw	Peter Ormond	Nicholas Dushko	Stephanie Davies	Jim Enos (Ind.)	Ted McMeekin; Ancaster—Dundas—Flamborough—Westdale

==== Niagara ====
Electoral district	Candidates							Incumbent
Electoral district	Liberal	PC	NDP	Green	Libertarian	NOTA	Other	Incumbent
Niagara Centre	Benoit Mercier	April Jeffs	Jeff Burch	Joe Dias	Patrick Pietruszko	Joe Crawford	Dario Smagata-Bryan (P); Steven Soos (Ind.)	Cindy Forster ◊ Welland
Niagara Falls	Dean Demizio	Chuck McShane	Wayne Gates	Karen Fraser	Shaun Somers		Goran Zubic (Mod.)	Wayne Gates
Niagara West	Joe Kanee	Sam Oosterhoff	Curtis Fric	Jessica Tillmanns	Stefanos Karatopis		Geoffrey E. Barton (MPO)	Sam Oosterhoff; Niagara West—Glanbrook
St. Catharines	Jim Bradley	Sandie Bellows	Jennie Stevens	Colin Ryrie	Daniel Tisi	Jim Fannon	Saleh Waziruddin (Comm.); Duke Willis (CAP)	Jim Bradley

=== Midwestern Ontario ===
Electoral district	Candidates						Incumbent
Electoral district	Liberal	PC	NDP	Green	Libertarian	Other	Incumbent
Brantford—Brant	Ruby Toor	Will Bouma	Alex Felsky	Ken Burns	Rob Ferguson	Nicholas Archer (NOTA); Leslie Bory (CCP); John Turmel (Paupers); Dave Wrobel (Ont.)	Dave Levac ◊ Brant
Cambridge	Kathryn McGarry	Belinda Karahalios	Marjorie Knight	Michele Braniff	Allan Dettweiler		Kathryn McGarry
Guelph	Sly Castaldi	Ray Ferraro	Agnieszka (Aggie) Mlynarz	**Mike Schreiner**	Michael Riehl	Juanita Burnett (Comm.); Thomas Mooney (Ont.); Paul Taylor (NOTA)	Liz Sandals ◊
Haldimand—Norfolk	Dan Matten	Toby Barrett	Danielle Du Sablon	Anne Faulkner	Christopher Rosser	Wasyl Luczkiw (MPO); Dan Preston (NOTA); Carolyn Ritchie (Paupers); Thecla Ross (FPO)	Toby Barrett
Huron—Bruce	Don Matheson	Lisa Thompson	Jan Johnstone	Nicholas Wendler	Ronald Stephens	Gerrie Huenemoerder (All.)	Lisa Thompson
Kitchener Centre	Daiene Vernile	Mary Henein Thorn	Laura Mae Lindo	Stacey Danckert	Jason Erb	Chris Carr (NOTA); Martin Suter (Comm.)	Daiene Vernile
Kitchener—Conestoga	Joe Gowing	Mike Harris Jr.	Kelly Dick	Bob Jonkman	Daniel Benoy	Dan Holt (CO)	Michael Harris ◊
Kitchener South—Hespeler	Surekha Shenoy	Amy Fee	Fitz Vanderpool	David Weber	Nathan Lajeunesse	Narine Sookram (Ind.)	New District
Oxford	James Howard	Ernie Hardeman	Tara King	Al De Jong	Chris Swift	Tim Hodges (FPO); David Sikal (Ind.); Robert Van Ryswyck (Ont.)	Ernie Hardeman
Perth—Wellington	Brendan Knight	Randy Pettapiece	Michael O'Brien	Lisa Olsen	Scott Marshall	Paul McKendrick (CO); Rob Smeenk (FPO); Andrew Stanton (All.)	Randy Pettapiece
Waterloo	Dorothy McCabe	Dan Weber	Catherine Fife	Zdravko Gunjevic	Andrew Allison		Catherine Fife; Kitchener—Waterloo
Wellington—Halton Hills	Jon Hurst	Ted Arnott	Diane Ballantyne	Dave Rodgers	Jadon Pfeiffer		Ted Arnott

=== Southwestern Ontario ===
Electoral district	Candidates						Incumbent
Electoral district	Liberal	PC	NDP	Green	Libertarian	Other	Incumbent
Chatham-Kent—Leamington	Margaret Schleier Stahl	Rick Nicholls	Jordan McGrail	Mark Vercouteren		Drew Simpson (Ind.)	Rick Nicholls; Chatham-Kent—Essex
Elgin—Middlesex—London	Carlie Forsythe	Jeff Yurek	Amanda Stratton	Bronagh Morgan	Richard Styve	Henri Barrette (POT); Dave Plumb (FPO)	Jeff Yurek
Essex	Kate Festeryga	Chris Lewis	Taras Natyshak	Nancy Pancheshan			Taras Natyshak
Lambton—Kent—Middlesex	Mike Radan	Monte McNaughton	Todd Case	Anthony Li	Brad Greulich	Brian Everaert (T)	Monte McNaughton
London—Fanshawe	Lawvin Hadisi	Eric Weniger	Teresa Armstrong	Lisa Carriere	Henryk Szymczyszyn	Stephen Campbell (NOTA); Rob Small (FPO)	Teresa Armstrong
London North Centre	Kate Graham	Susan Truppe	Terence Kernaghan	Carol Dyck	Calvin McKay	**Paul McKeever** (FPO); Clara Sorrenti (Comm.)	Deb Matthews ◊
London West	Jonathan Hughes	Andrew Lawton	Peggy Sattler	Pamela Reid	Jacques Boudreau	Brad Harness (CO); Michael Lewis (Comm.); Tracey Pringle (FPO)	Peggy Sattler
Sarnia—Lambton	Neil Wereley	Bob Bailey	Kathy Alexander	Kevin Shaw		Andy Bruziewicz(T); Fanina R. Kodre (N/A); Jeff Lozier (NOTA)	Bob Bailey
Windsor—Tecumseh	Remy Boulbol	Mohammad Latif	Percy Hatfield	Henry Oulevey		Laura Chesnik (Ind.)	Percy Hatfield
Windsor West	Rino Bortolin	Adam Ibrahim	Lisa Gretzky	Krysta Glovasky-Ridsdale		Chad Durocher (NOTA)	Lisa Gretzky

=== Northern Ontario ===
==== Northeastern Ontario ====
Electoral district	Candidates							Incumbent
Electoral district	Liberal	PC	NDP	Green	Libertarian	Northern Ontario	Other	Incumbent
Algoma—Manitoulin	Charles Fox	Jib Turner	Michael Mantha	Justin Tilson	Kalena Mallon-Ferguson	Tommy Lee		Michael Mantha
Mushkegowuk—James Bay	Gaëtan Baillargeon	André Robichaud	Guy Bourgouin	Sarah Hutchinson	Vanda Marshall	Jacques Joseph Ouellette	Fauzia Sadiq (CoR)	New District
Nickel Belt	Tay Butt	Jo-Ann Cardinal	France Gélinas	Bill Crumplin	James Chretien	Matthew Del Papa	Kevin R Brault (CO); Bailey Burch-Belanger (NOTA)	France Gélinas
Nipissing	Stephen Glass	Vic Fedeli	Henri Giroux	Kris Rivard	Bond Keevil	**Trevor Holliday**		Vic Fedeli
Parry Sound—Muskoka	Brenda Rhodes	Norm Miller	Erin Horvath	Matt Richter	Christopher Packer		Joshua Macdonald (NOTA); Jeff Mole (Ind.)	Norm Miller
Sault Ste. Marie	Jaclynne Hamel	Ross Romano	Michele McCleave-Kennedy	Kara Flannigan	Lance Brizard	Sandy Holmberg		Ross Romano
Sudbury	Glenn Thibeault	Troy Crowder	Jamie West	David Robinson	James Wendler		Mila Chavez Wong (CO); David J. Popescu (Ind.); David Sylvestre (NOTA)	Glenn Thibeault
Timiskaming—Cochrane	Brian Johnson	Margaret Williams	John Vanthof	Casey Lalonde	Lawrence Schnarr	Shawn Poirier		John Vanthof
Timmins	Mickey Auger	Yvan Genier	Gilles Bisson	Lucas Schinbeckler	Jozef Bauer	Gary Schaap		Gilles Bisson; Timmins—James Bay

==== Northwestern Ontario ====
Electoral district	Candidates							Incumbent
Electoral district	Liberal	PC	NDP	Green	Libertarian	Northern Ontario	Other	Incumbent
Kenora—Rainy River	Karen Kejick	Greg Rickford	Glen Archer	Ember McKillop				Sarah Campbell ◊
Kiiwetinoong	Doug Lawrance	Clifford Bull	Sol Mamakwa	Christine Penner Polle		Kenneth Jones		New District
Thunder Bay—Atikokan	Bill Mauro	Brandon Postuma	Judith Monteith-Farrell	John Northey	Dorothy Snell	David Bruno		Bill Mauro
Thunder Bay—Superior North	Michael Gravelle	Derek Parks	Lise Vaugeois	Amanda Moddejonge	Tony Gallo	Andy Wolff	Louise Ewen (T)	Michael Gravelle
