= Green Party of Ontario candidates in the 1995 Ontario provincial election =

The Green Party of Ontario fielded several candidates in the 1995 provincial election, none of whom were elected. Information about these candidates may be found here.

== Candidates ==
=== Brantford: William Darfler ===
William Darfler was born on a small farm in New York State and moved to Brantford in the late 1960s. He taught high school mathematics, worked in a free school, and later worked for many years as a letter carrier. He has been a leading member of the Brantford Heritage Committee, and in 2004 he promoted the idea of a Canadian Industrial Heritage Museum for Brantford.

Darfler has been a Green Party candidate in two provincial elections. He was forty-eight years old in 1995 and promoted the idea of a guaranteed annual income.

As of 2010, he is a historical researcher for the Ontario Visual Heritage Project. In 2009, he received a grant from the Canadian First World War Internment Recognition Fund to study a little-known case of one hundred Turkish foundry workers rounded up from their homes in Brantford during World War I and sent to an internment camp in Kapuskasing.

Electoral record
Election	Division	Party	Votes	%	Place	Winner
1990 provincial	Brantford	Green	436	1.20	5/6	Brad Ward, New Democratic Party
1995 provincial	Brantford	Green	430	1.28	5/5	Ron Johnson, Progressive Conservative

=== Downsview: Tiina Leivo ===
Leivo was thirty-seven years old at the time of the election, and worked as a group facilitator for health food groups. She opposed subway expansion. She received 217 votes (0.94%), finishing fifth against Liberal candidate Annamarie Castrilli.

=== Muskoka–Georgian Bay: Michael Fenton ===
Michael L. Fenton received 411 votes (1.19%), finishing fourth against Progressive Conservative candidate Bill Grimmett.

=== Sudbury: Lewis Poulin ===
Lewis Poulin holds a Bachelor of Science degree in Physics from Laurentian University (1982). He is a meteorologist, and has worked for Environment Canada over a period of several years. The first Green Party candidate to run in Sudbury, he received 290 votes (0.95%) in 1995 for a sixth-place against Liberal candidate Rick Bartolucci.

Poulin moved to Mississauga in 1997. He was later profiled in a Toronto Star piece that drew attention to the fact that he did not own a car, and walked fifteen minutes to work every day. Poulin expressed concerns about pedestrian safety in this Greater Toronto Area community. In the same period, he wrote about health safety issues caused by smog, and advocated rooftop solar panels to generate power. In May 1998, he wrote a piece in support of wind power projects for economically marginal communities in Newfoundland and Labrador.

Poulin later moved to the Montreal community of Roxboro in 2002, and became a member of that city's Green Coalition. In 2005, he called for tax incentives for people who take public transit.
