= Ontario Visual Heritage Project =

The Ontario Visual Heritage Project (OVHP) is a not-for-profit organization established in 2001 and based in Ontario, Canada. The aim of the OVHP is to create multimedia tool kits which are meant "to teach, preserve and promote the history of Ontario to audiences young and old." The documentary is the central component of each project, and is augmented by a website, a course-guide for educators, and an interactive DVD which allows viewers to access stories via a timeline, through their location, or according to their theme.

Since 2001, the OVHP has produced 11 different toolkits for communities in Ontario, including Haldimand County, Oxford County, Brant-Brantford, Norfolk County, Lambton County, Chatham-Kent, Muskoka District Municipality, West Parry Sound, Manitoulin Island, and Greater Sudbury. In 2007 the OVHP was awarded the 25th Anniversary Great Grants Award from the Ontario Trillium Foundation and in 2006 was also awarded the Ontario Museum Association Award of Excellence for the Lambton County project.

The projects were started by two high school students Zach Melnick and Jeremy LaLonde of Cayuga, Ontario. Zach Melnick remains as the current director of the project with producer Yvonne Drebert.
