= Green Party of Ontario =

Provincial political party in Canada

Green Party of Ontario Parti vert de l'Ontario
- Abbreviation: GPO; PVO
- Leader: Mike Schreiner
- President: Ard Van Leeuwen
- Deputy leaders: Aislinn Clancy; Matt Richter
- Founded: 1983; 43 years ago
- Headquarters: Suite 232; 67 Mowat Avenue; Toronto, Ontario; M6K 3E3
- Youth wing: Young Greens of Ontario
- Ideology: Green politics
- Political position: Centre-left
- Colours: Green
- Legislative Assembly: 2 / 124

Website
- gpo.ca

The Green Party of Ontario (GPO; French: Parti vert de l'Ontario, PVO), also known as Ontario Greens, is a provincial political party in Ontario, Canada. It has run candidates in every Ontario election since 1985, and has contested every riding in elections since 2007.

The party's support peaked in the 2007 election at 8% of the popular vote, but dropped in the following election in 2011. In the four general elections since, its vote share has hovered around the 5% level. In the 2025 election, Green Party candidates were elected in two ridings.

The party is led by Mike Schreiner, who has represented the riding of Guelph since he first won election there in 2018 and became his party's first member of the Legislative Assembly of Ontario. The party gained a second MPP when Aislinn Clancy won the 2023 Kitchener Centre by-election. She held on to the seat in the 2025 general election.

== History ==
=== Early years, 1983–1990 ===
In mid-1983, inspired by the electoral success of the Greens in West Germany, a small group of Ontarians launched a provincial Green Party. Starting with around 40 members and informally led by Dr. Trevor Hancock, the fledgling party began to develop a platform and sought to gather the 10,000 signatures (Note: In 2007, the petition requirement for new party registration was reduced to 1,000 names. "Election Finances Act, R.S.O. 1990, c. E.7". Ontario e-laws. 17 March 2026.) necessary for obtaining official party status.

By the following year, their petition had been endorsed by 11,665 eligible voters, and on 4 July 1984, the Green Party of Ontario was approved by the Ontario Commission on Election Contributions and Expenses, bringing the number of registered parties in Ontario to eight. (Note: The seven other official parties in Ontario in 1984 were Conservative, Liberal, NDP, Communist, Libertarian, Freedom (formerly Unparty), and Social Credit (defunct before 1985 election).) The party could accept contributions and issue tax receipts, and was the second green party to be registered in Canada—the Green Party of British Columbia having been registered the year before. (The Green Party of Canada was registered federally a month later).

With nine chapters and nearly 500 members, the Green Party of Ontario was described as being pro-peace, pro-environment, and cutting across the political left and right. Hancock was nominally leader, but the party platform rejected centralized power.

In 1985 the party contested its first election, fielding nine candidates who collected a combined 5,345 votes. This represented 2% of the 264,076 votes cast in those nine ridings. Christopher Kowalchuk received 2,008 out of 34,241 votes, almost 6%, in the riding of Oakville. But the other eight Green candidates each drew well under 1,000 votes.

Disappointed by these results, many of the original members lost interest and left the party, which became highly decentralized, with no leader, no policy development, and no support structure for candidates.

With seven candidates in the 1987 election, the party fared worse, collecting 3,398 votes. Again only one candidate received more than 1,000 votes—Christopher Kowalchuk, this time running in Oakville South—and the other six candidates averaged less than 400 votes each.

In the 1990 election, the Greens had hopes of winning the Parry Sound riding, where their candidate Richard Thomas was running against Conservative incumbent Ernie Eves for the third time. Eves, a future premier, had first won the seat in 1981 when he beat Thomas, then running for the Liberals, by just six votes (earning Eves the ironic sobriquet, "Landslide Ernie"). Thomas, who placed third in the 1982 Ontario Liberal party leadership race, contested the riding for the Liberals again in 1985 and captured 44% of the vote but lost to Eves, who received 51%.

Running for the Greens in 1990, Thomas placed third—ahead of the NDP—with 4,061 votes. This was less than half the vote count he had scored as a Liberal, yet it set a record—17 years would pass before an Ontario Green candidate would win more votes. Overall the Ontario Greens increased their presence and their support in the 1990 election, with 40 candidates garnering 30,097 votes.

=== 1993–1999 ===
By 1993, the Green Party of Ontario, with between 100 and 200 members, was transforming into a more structured political organization, and it had its first official leader: Ottawa school teacher Frank de Jong. Born in 1955 to Dutch immigrants, de Jong was raised on a dairy farm near Arthur. For several years he had been involved with the Green parties of both Ontario and Canada, and had been a candidate in several elections.

The following year, de Jong bicycled 2,000 km around the province on a pre-election tour, spreading the message that the Greens were not a one-issue party concerned only with the environment. The party platform promoted preventative health care, community-based education, economic development, and electoral reform.

The 1995 election catapulted the Progressive Conservatives from third party in the legislature to majority government. In their wake, all other parties suffered losses, and the Greens were no exception—their previous vote share was cut in half. The 37 Green party candidates collected 14,108 votes.

By 1999, party membership had reached about 400 and leader de Jong had moved to Toronto, where he taught public school. The party had an office but no paid staff and continued to lean to the left with its environmental aspirations (support wind and solar power, phase out nuclear plants, discourage automobiles, encourage rail). Yet the party platform also contained right-wing aspects (favour free markets and balanced budgets, oppose income tax). Other proposals included a four-day work-week, to reduce stress and unemployment, and support for stay-at-home parents.

The Greens were not expecting to elect any MPPs in the 1999 election—de Jong saw the campaign as an opportunity to bring forward environmental issues, and hoped to lay the groundwork for electing members within the next decade. The party ran 58 candidates and amassed 30,781 votes, regaining its earlier popularity—though the votes were spread across more ridings than before.

=== 2001–2006 ===
In 2001 the Greens enjoyed an exceptional result in a March by-election in Parry Sound—Muskoka. Richard Thomas ran again and placed third, capturing just over 12% of the vote—almost quadruple the NDP's share.

Ontario leader Frank de Jong was encouraged when the Green Party of British Columbia, taken seriously by the media for the first time, got 12% of the vote in the May 2001 election—he felt that greens across Canada were gaining momentum.

By the time of the GPO annual general meeting later that year, the party had 900 members. More than 100 attended, making it the biggest turnout yet. Held in Port Hope on 3 November 2001, the all-day event included speeches, votes for party positions, and work on resolutions. Deputy leader Judy Greenwood-Speers of Waterloo had set in motion a leadership challenge—something that was allowed at any annual general meeting. Frank de Jong had last survived a challenge in 1999, and staved off this one with 271 votes to 167 for Greenwood-Speers.

By late 2002 the GPO—whose province-wide support had always been less than the margin of error—was finally registering in public opinion polls, achieving 6% in an October 2002 Ipsos Reid poll. Subsequent polls showed support gradually decreasing over the next few months, and by the summer of 2003 the Greens were back in margin-of-error territory. But their membership had grown to almost 1,200.

In the October 2003 election, the party reaped 126,651 votes, a share of 2.82%. Two of their candidates placed third, ahead of the NDP: Tom Manley in Stormont—Dundas—Charlottenburgh, and Frank de Jong, running in Dufferin—Peel—Wellington—Grey, where he grew up on his family's dairy farm. Overall, the Greens contested 102 out of a possible 103 ridings and placed fourth in 92 of them.

Prior to the election, an Oracle poll found that 73% of Ontario voters thought the Green party should be included in the televised leaders' debate, but de Jong was excluded, and his appeal to the CRTC was rejected.

Between the 2003 and 2007 elections, the Green party consistently scored around 8% support in public opinion polls, though in nine out of ten by-elections in that period their vote share was lower. The exception was the March 2005 by-election held to replace former opposition leader Ernie Eves, who had resigned his Dufferin—Peel—Wellington—Grey seat. Running in that by-election against Progressive Conservative leader John Tory, Green leader Frank de Jong placed fourth but received almost 10% of the vote.

In late October 2005 de Jong narrowly passed a leadership review, requiring at least two-thirds support, at the party's annual general meeting. Attended by almost 200, it was held at Geneva Park north of Orillia. One of the resolutions passed called for lowering the voting age to sixteen years.

At the party's 2006 annual general meeting, constitutional changes were made, such as requiring gender-paritied representatives from each of six regions, gender-paritied deputy leaders, and the creation of multiple functionary roles separated from the provincial executive. One of the first acts of the new provincial executive was to strike a hiring committee to bring on a full-time campaign manager to ensure election readiness.

=== 2007 ===
==== Campaign ====
In the run-up to the October 2007 election, opinion polls showed the Greens' province-wide support climbing into double-digits for the first time. Membership—which four years earlier had been around 1,200—was close to 3,000 and the party could now afford a paid staff member.

Despite the Greens polling just 2% below the NDP, de Jong was again excluded from the televised leaders' debate. According to the broadcasters, the Greens failed to qualify by not having seats in the legislature, by not running a full slate of candidates, and by having no chance of influencing the outcome of the election. Though the first point was true, the second was factually incorrect, and the third was arguably false.

The campaign platform proposed reducing personal taxes by cancelling the health tax and by shifting some of the burden away from homeowners and businesses to environmentally harmful activities, while remaining revenue neutral overall. The party supported the public health system and wanted an end to separate school funding. Generally, the party sought to encourage economic prosperity, environmental stewardship, and social justice, not by spending more money, but by shifting priorities to achieve sustainable results. The party was staking out the centre of the political spectrum: according to de Jong, right-versus-left was passé—now it was green-versus-grey.

With its free-enterprise philosophy, the Green party had few links to the green establishment, i.e. the big NGO's, which tended to support the mainstream parties. Leader de Jong described his relationship with green organizations as tenuous.

The Green party fielded a full slate of 107 candidates in the 2007 election, and in at least half of the ridings, the Greens mounted robust campaigns. This somewhat paid off, De Jong successfully managed to achieve a great deal more media attention than the party had historically received. However, the ultimate result whilst still positive for the greens, didn't result in them being able to gain a significant amount of influence.

Many voters liked the Green party platform, with its combination of environmentalism and libertarian economics, and importantly, opposition to public funding for catholic schools and other faith-based education—a clear stand that was distinct from the other parties.

==== Election and aftermath ====
After the polls closed on October 10, 2007, the Green party's tally was 354,897 votes, or 8.02%. Though still shut out of the legislature, the party had almost tripled its 2003 vote share, finished third in 18 ridings, and finished second in Bruce—Grey—Owen Sound, (Note: The Greens vote share was 33.1% compared to the PC incumbent winner's 46.7% in Bruce—Grey—Owen Sound in 2007.) where Shane Jolley received 15,039 votes, more than any green party candidate in Canadian history at that time.

Some pundits felt that the increase in the Greens' popularity had happened before the election, that the election-night score reflected the party's average in opinion polls taken since 2004. This suggested that the energetic campaign, with its unprecedented media attention, had achieved little. Another theory was that the Greens were a single-issue party that had plateaued—future momentum would be elusive because environmentalism had been co-opted by the other parties. But Green leader de Jong saw the election as a breakthrough, and proclaimed the Greens a major party, entrenched in Ontario's political landscape.

De Jong achieved a post-election victory in the form of an October 2007 court ruling that invalidated the $200 deposit required of candidates. The deposit was only refunded if a candidate got more than 10% of the vote. Lawyer Peter Rosenthal argued the case on behalf of de Jong, and Mr. Justice Paul Perell of the Superior Court of Ontario agreed that the provision violated the Charter of Rights and Freedoms, and struck it down.

Twenty Green party candidates had regained their deposits in the recent election, but virtually every other Green candidate, going back to the 1984 election, had lost theirs. De Jong hailed the ruling as a boost for fairer elections.

==== Convention ====
The Green Party of Ontario held their annual general meeting on 25 November 2007. Party membership was up to 3,300 and 109 delegates attended. Concerns were expressed over fundraising (the party's recent election budget was less than $200,000) and organization (only 65 ridings out of 107 had active Green associations).

But considering the shoestring budget, rudimentary organization, and frequent difficulty in finding appropriate candidates, the vote gain was impressive. The prevailing view at the convention was that to be ready for the next election, the party needed to build up its organization, membership, and fundraising.

Another order of business was the mandatory biennial leadership review. Of the 403 votes cast, including almost 300 mail-in ballots from absent members, 71% supported Frank de Jong. This was above the two-thirds minimum needed for him to remain leader. Given the work ahead, there was little appetite for the distraction of a leadership race. De Jong, who had been leader for 14 years, remained popular and was given much of the credit for the party's strong performance in the recent election.

=== 2009: New leader ===
The previous GPO logo

Eighteen months later, at the annual general meeting held 16 May 2009, de Jong announced his resignation as leader. Deputy leader Judy Smith-Torrie described de Jong as being the embodiment of Green values and lifestyle. A leadership and policy convention was held 13–15 November 2009 in London, Ontario, and Mike Schreiner, a Toronto entrepreneur who was the sole candidate, became the party's new leader. Schreiner committed to be the party's first full-time leader (during his 16-year tenure, de Jong worked part-time as a school teacher). Though he had placed third, ahead of the NDP, in the March 2009 Haliburton—Kawartha Lakes—Brock by-election (in which Conservative leader John Tory was defeated), Schreiner was initially undecided on where he would run in the 2011 general election.

=== 2011–2014 ===
The party's popularity sank back to 2003 levels in the 2011 election, a tightly contested race between the Conservatives and ruling Liberals. The Greens campaigned on community food programs, local farming initiatives, sustainable health care and environmental issues, and saw increases in membership and fundraising. But they were disadvantaged by exclusion from the televised leaders' debate, and by the Liberals' environmentally-friendly platform, which probably co-opted green votes. Although Leader Mike Schreiner finished with about 9% of the vote in the Simcoe-Grey riding, where he placed 4th, the party's overall share was less than 3%.

In the 2014 election the party regained some ground and received 235,911 votes or 4.89% province-wide, and Schreiner picked up almost 20% of the vote in his riding of Guelph. But the Greens had yet to win a seat in the legislature.

=== 2018: Breakthrough ===
In the 2018 election, their third with Mike Schreiner as leader, the party ran on a platform of investing in green jobs and clean energy, rolling out a universal basic income, and investing in mental health services. The party ran a full slate of candidates including over 50% women for the first time. Schreiner was excluded from the televised leaders' debates, which led to an unsuccessful campaign by Fair Debates to encourage media to reverse the decisions.

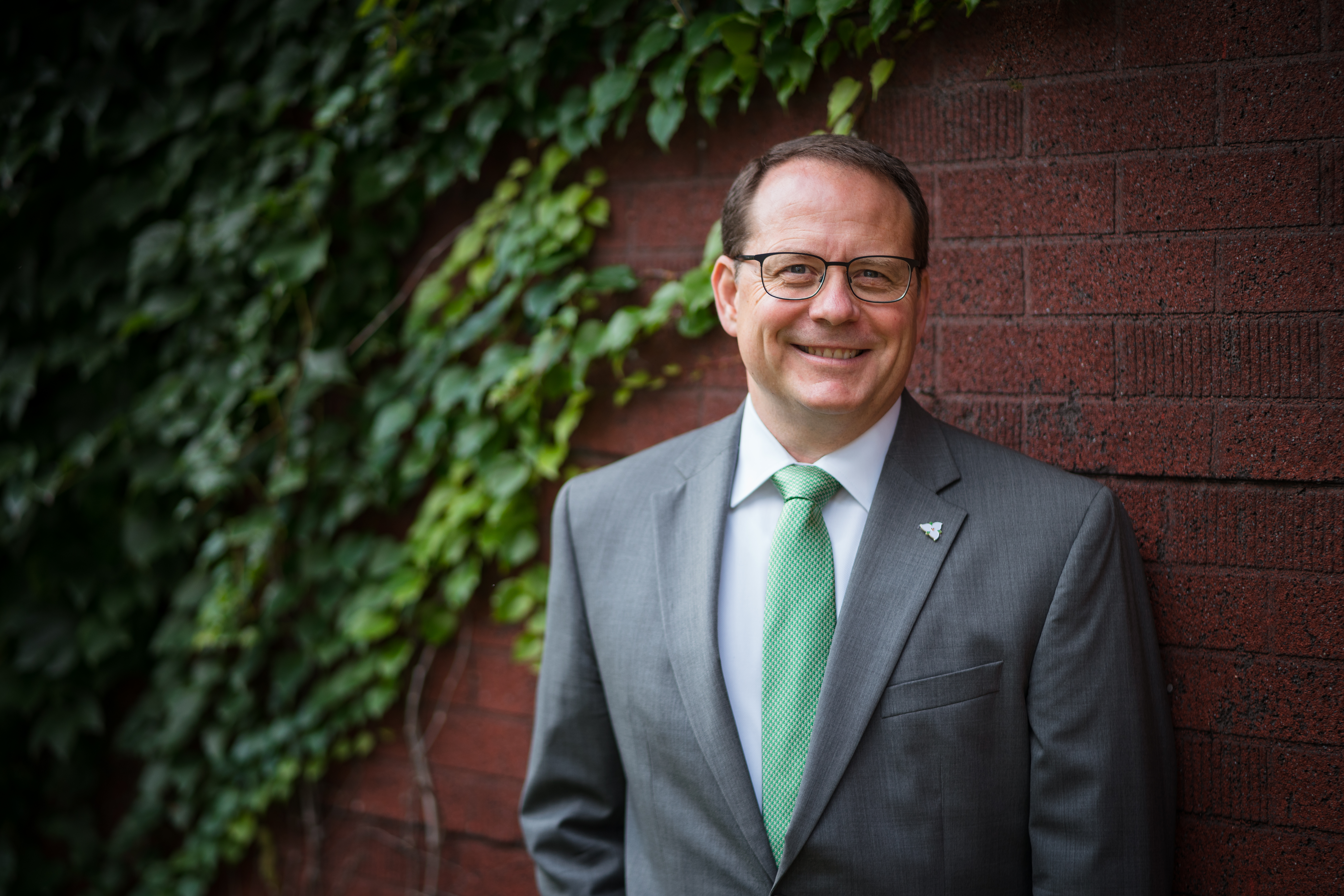
In 2018, party leader Mike Schreiner became the first Green MPP elected to the Ontario Legislature.

In May 2018, a month ahead of that year's general election, the Toronto Star editorial board endorsed Schreiner as the best candidate in Guelph and said that he was "the most forthright leader in the campaign for the 7 June Ontario election." Schreiner was also endorsed by the Guelph Mercury's editorial board in an op-ed, "Mike Schreiner is the candidate most worthy of representing Guelph provincially," citing ten reasons to vote for Schreiner.

Schreiner's campaign proved successful, and he was elected as the first ever Green MPP in Ontario history. He captured 45 per cent of the vote in the Guelph riding, more than doubling the previous percentage and nearly tripling his raw vote numbers.

=== 2022–2023: Expanding ===
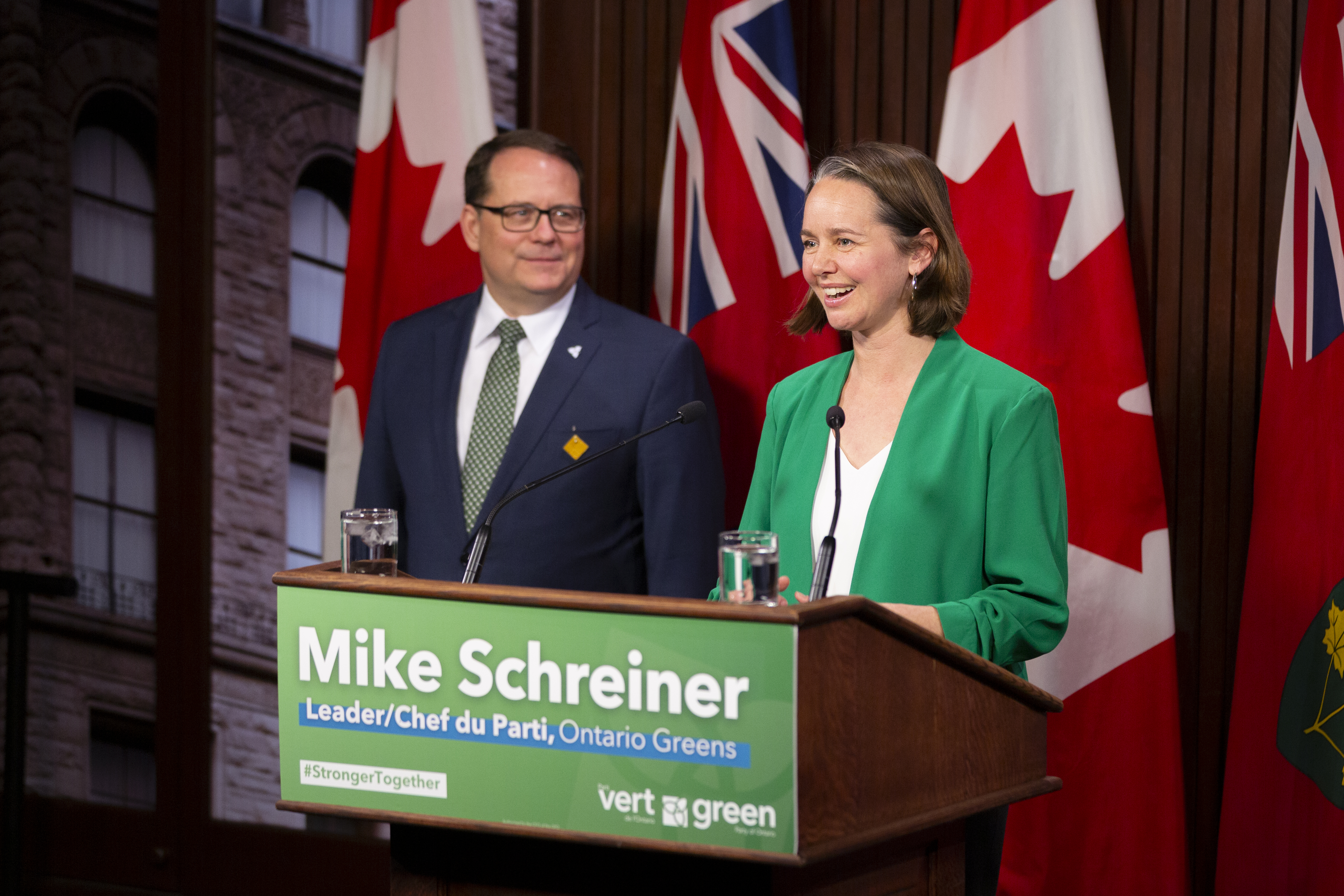
Deputy leader Aislinn Clancy was elected in 2023.

Schreiner was re-elected in the 2022 provincial election and was again the only Green candidate elected. The party narrowly lost in Parry Sound—Muskoka, a riding that had been held by the Progressive Conservatives since its establishment in 1999. Green candidate Matt Richter placed second to PC candidate Graydon Smith, losing by just over 2,100 votes.

The party elected its second MPP in 2023. Green candidate and deputy leader Aislinn Clancy was elected in a 2023 by-election in Kitchener Centre, doubling Green representation in the Legislature. Clancy won just under 48% of the vote, solidly beating the NDP candidate. The seat had previously been in New Democratic hands since 2018.

== Policies ==
The Green Party of Ontario shares the values identified by the Global Greens: participatory democracy, nonviolence, social justice, sustainability, respect for diversity and ecological wisdom. The party describes itself as socially progressive, environmentally focused and fiscally responsible.

In the lead-up to the 2022 election, the party released policy papers focused on housing, climate change and mental health. Its 2022 platform identified three priorities: a caring society, focussed on improving equitable healthcare, education, and social services; connected communities, focussed on tackling housing affordability by building more infill development, strengthening protections for renters and addressing speculation in the housing market; and new climate economy, focused on achieving net-zero emissions by 2045 by replacing fossil fuels with renewable energy sources, growing green jobs and protecting the environment.

=== Housing ===
The party advocates for more permissive zoning laws that allow the construction of missing-middle and midrise housing. It argues that infill development is more environmentally friendly and cost-effective than sprawl development.

Its elected members have also called for more stringent tenants protections and for the province to partner with non-profit and co-operative housing providers to build affordable non-market homes.

The party's housing plan, released in 2021, featured seven strategies to build what the party referred to as "more liveable and affordable communities". They included building more inclusive neighbourhoods through missing middle and midrise development, protecting farmland and other natural land from urban sprawl, building and maintaining a provincial affordable housing supply, ending chronic homelessness, strengthening protections for renters and addressing speculation in the housing market. The Toronto Star editorial board endorsed the plan, referring to it as "an ambitious document that proposes tackling the housing crisis from all vantage points".

=== Climate ===
The Green Party supports phasing out fossil fuels and moving to renewable energy sources. Its platform included a number of measures to increase the affordability and accessibility of electric vehicles, retrofit homes and businesses to increase energy efficiency, and phase out fossil fuels to reach net zero by 2045.

The party was opposed to the construction of new nuclear plants. However, in November 2024, the party formally reversed its position on nuclear energy at its Annual General Meeting. Party delegates passed a resolution recognizing nuclear power as a low-emission energy source and supported the use of Canadian-designed CANDU reactors as part of Ontario's electricity mix. It has also called for an end to the province's offshore wind moratorium in order to increase access to renewable power.

Greens advocate for stronger protections to wetlands and agricultural land. Party leader Mike Schreiner was vocal in opposing the Ford government's plan to allow development on southern Ontario's Greenbelt, which was ultimately reversed in 2023.

=== Health ===
The Greens' healthcare policies are rooted in prevention, including increasing upstream investments in the social determinants of health like social isolation, housing insecurity and poverty, as well as partnering with the federal government to implement universal pharmacare and dental care programs. The party advocates for improving the recruitment, retention and safety of public healthcare workers. It supports a publicly funded, publicly delivered healthcare system and opposes the privatisation of healthcare services.

The party supports a non-profit long-term care system and has called to phase out for-profit long-term care homes while increasing base funding for the sector. In its 2022 platform, the party pledged to build 55,000 long-term care beds by 2033 and at least 96,000 by 2041.

In 2022, the party released a mental health policy paper calling for the expansion of access to mental health and addictions care under OHIP and an immediate base budget increase of 8% to the community mental health sector.

=== Education ===
The party's education platform includes updating Ontario's funding formula to reflect evolving student needs, including adequate funding for special education and rural and remote schools.

The party supports in-person learning and opposes mandatory e-learning or hybrid learning models. It has called for the elimination of EQAO standardised testing.

In the 2022 provincial election, the party pledged to cap elementary classroom sizes at 24 students for grades four through eight and at 26 students for kindergarten.

At the postsecondary level, the party has called to increase sector funding by indexing the base operating grant for Ontario's postsecondary institutions to the weighted national average.

Its 2022 platform called for the reversal of OSAP funding cuts through the conversion of loans to grants for low- and middle-income students and the elimination of interest charges on student debt.

During the 2007 provincial election, education, and specifically the funding of religious schools, was a central issue. GPO policy calls for an end to the publicly funded Catholic school system, a merger that it claimed would save millions of dollars in duplicate administrative costs.

=== Social programs ===
The Green Party of Ontario believes in modernizing the social safety net to account for present-day challenges. Greens have advocated for the doubling of the Ontario Disability Support Program and Ontario Works.

It has been an advocate for a universal Basic Income for all Ontarians, in order to provide economic security while at the same time cutting red tape and bureaucracy.

The party supports ten-dollar-a-day daycare. In its 2022 platform, it pledged to work with the federal government to ensure continued funding for universal access to ten-dollar-a-day care.

During the COVID-19 pandemic, Green party leader Mike Schreiner called for an increase in the number of provincially legislated sick days from three to ten and for a ban on employers requiring sick notes from employees who take time off due to illness.

=== Electoral reform ===
The GPO is a strong supporter of electoral reform. In its 2022 election platform, it called for the creation of a "diverse, randomly selected Citizens Assembly on electoral reform" to provide recommendations on how to modernise the Ontario electoral system to better reflect voters' democratic will.

=== Taxation ===
Greens have historically supported tax relief for small businesses, generally funded by modest increases to the corporate tax rate. They have also proposed road pricing (including tolls, parking levies and land-value taxes near subways) to pay for public transit.

The party has proposed a number of tax measures to reduce speculation in the housing market, including a multi-homes tax on all individuals and corporations owning more than two residential properties, a vacant homes tax and an anti-flipping tax.

The party favours a revenue neutral carbon fee-and-dividend approach to pollution pricing. In its 2022 platform, it proposed to take over federal administration of the carbon pricing system, increasing the price by $25 annually until it reaches $300/tonne and returning all revenues collected from individuals to individuals as dividends.

== Party leaders ==
Picture
Name
Term start
Term end
Ridings contested as Leader
Notes
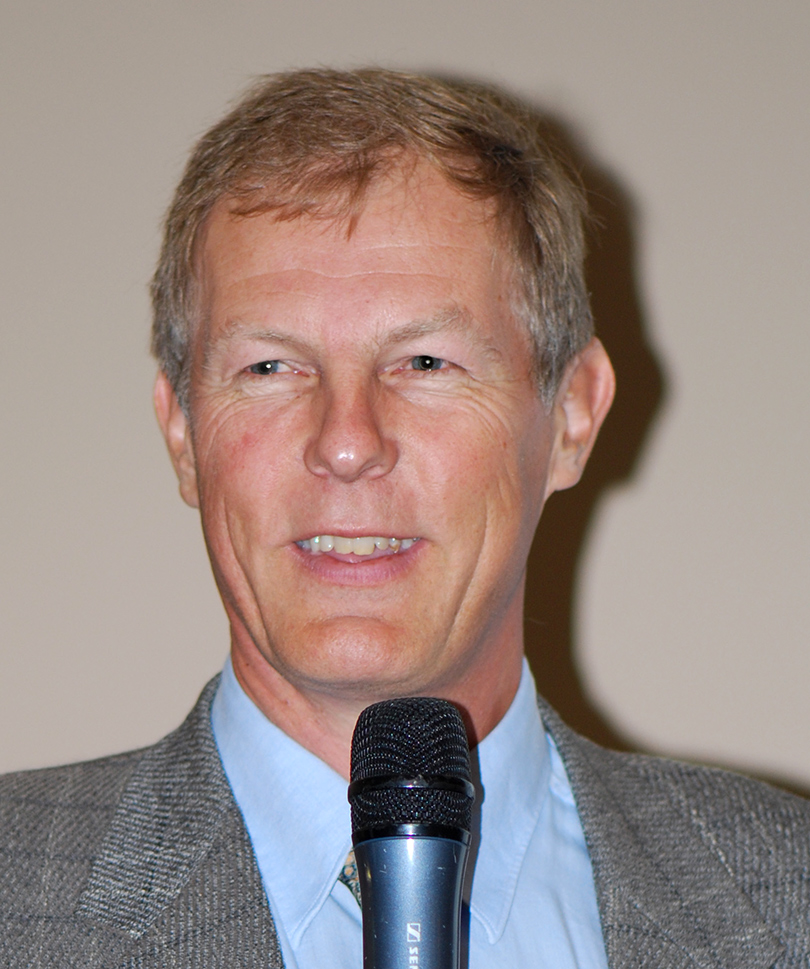
Frank de Jong
1993
2009

General elections	By-elections
Nepean (1995) – Loss	Parkdale—High Park (2006) – Loss
Parkdale—High Park (1999) – Loss	Burlington (2007) – Loss
Dufferin—Peel—Wellington—Grey (2003) – Loss
Davenport (2007) – Loss

First Leader, elected in 1993, and re-elected 2001. Later served as Leader of the Yukon Green Party (2016–2019)
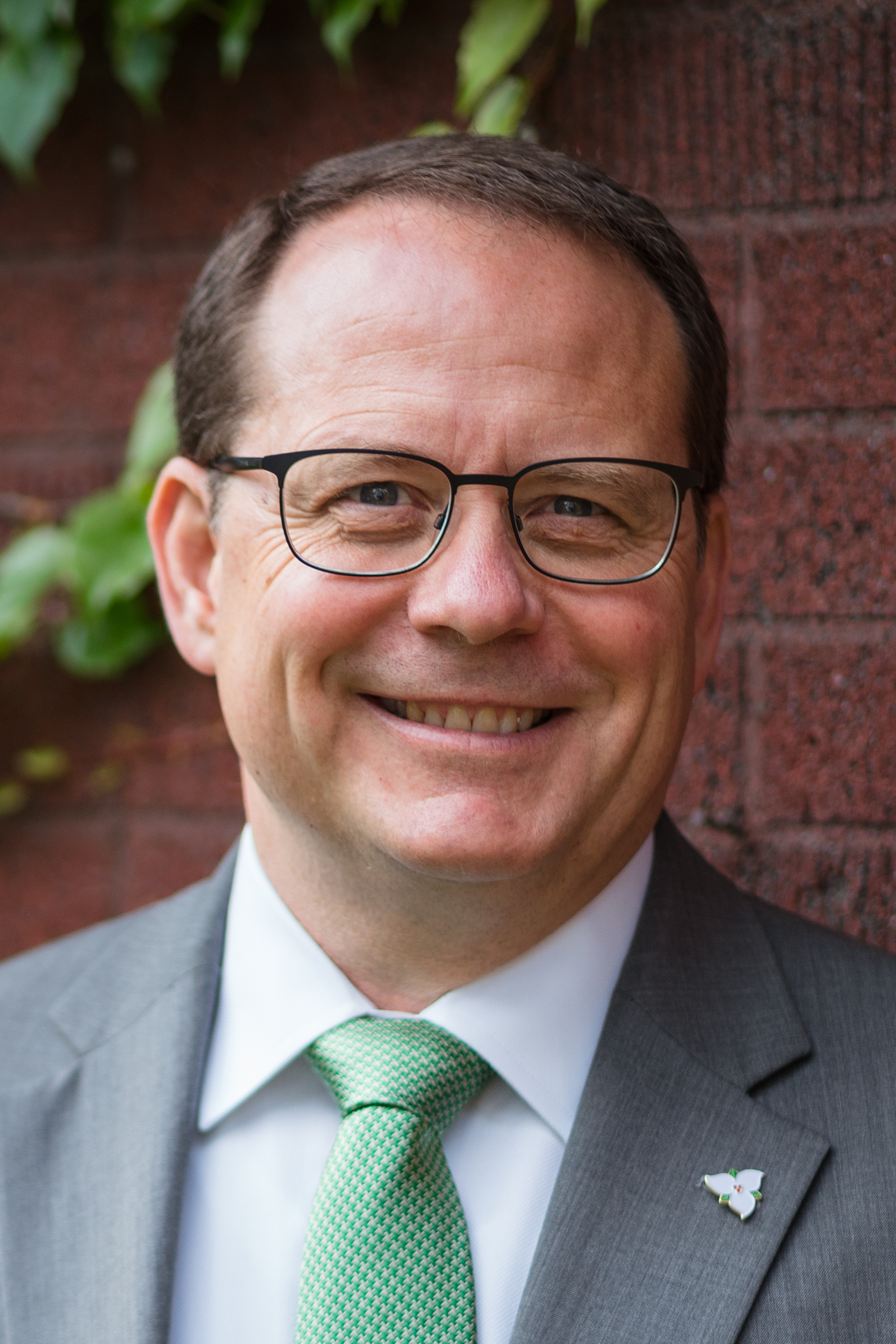
Mike Schreiner
November 2009
Incumbent
Simcoe—Grey (2011) – Loss
Guelph (2014) – Loss
Guelph (2018) – Win
Guelph (2022) – Win
Guelph (2025) – Win
Elected Leader in 2009, unopposed. First leader to win a seat in the Ontario legislature (2018–present)

== Elected Greens ==
- 2018, 2022, 2025: Mike Schreiner, elected in Guelph
- 2023 by-election, 2025 general election: Aislinn Clancy, elected in Kitchener Centre

== Election results ==
Election	Leader	# of seats	Change +/−	# of candidates	# of votes	% of popular vote	Standing	Legislative role	Government
1985	N/A	0 / 125	New Party	9	5,345	0.15%	Steady	Extra-parliamentary	Progressive Conservative minority defeated in no confidence vote, replaced by Liberal minority
1987	N/A	0 / 130	Steady	7	3,398	0.09%	Steady	Extra-parliamentary	Liberal majority
1990	N/A	0 / 130	Steady	40	30,097	0.75%	Steady	Extra-parliamentary	NDP majority
1995	Frank de Jong	0 / 130	Steady	37	14,108	0.34%	Steady	Extra-parliamentary	Progressive Conservative majority
1999	Frank de Jong	0 / 103	Steady	58	30,781	0.70%	Steady	Extra-parliamentary	Progressive Conservative majority
2003	Frank de Jong	0 / 103	Steady	102	126,651	2.82%	Steady	Extra-parliamentary	Liberal majority
2007	Frank de Jong	0 / 107	Steady	107	354,897	8.02%	Steady	Extra-parliamentary	Liberal majority
2011	Mike Schreiner	0 / 107	Steady	107	126,021	2.92%	Steady	Extra-parliamentary	Liberal minority
2014	Mike Schreiner	0 / 107	Steady	107	235,911	4.89%	Steady	Extra-parliamentary	Liberal majority
2018	Mike Schreiner	1 / 124	▲1	124	264,519	4.60%	▲4th	No status	Progressive Conservative majority
2022	Mike Schreiner	1 / 124	Steady	124	280,006	5.96%	4th	No status	Progressive Conservative majority
2025	Mike Schreiner	2 / 124	▲1	124	242,320	4.83%	4th	No status	Progressive Conservative majority

"Data Explorer". Elections Ontario.

== See also ==
- Green Party of Ontario candidates in Ontario provincial elections
- List of Green party leaders in Canada
- List of Green Party of Ontario candidates
- List of Green politicians who have held office in Canada
- List of Ontario general elections
- List of political parties in Ontario
- Politics of Ontario
