= Ford ministry =

Government of Ontario, Canada since 2018

- Cabinet of Ontario
- 2018–present
- Date formed: June 29, 2018

People and organizations
- Monarch: Elizabeth II; Charles III
- Lieutenant Governor: Elizabeth Dowdeswell; Edith Dumont
- Premier: Doug Ford
- Premier's history: Premiership of Doug Ford
- Deputy Premier: Christine Elliott (2018-22); Sylvia Jones (since 2022)
- No. of ministers: 37 (as of Sept. 10, 2026); 21 (start), 37 (maximum)
- Total no. of members: 55
- Member party: █ Progressive Conservative
- Status in legislature: Majority
- Opposition cabinet: Shadow cabinet in the 44th, 43rd, 42nd parliaments
- Opposition party: █ New Democratic
- Opposition leader: Andrea Horwath (2018–22); Peter Tabuns (2022–23); Marit Stiles (since 2023)

History
- Elections: 2018, 2022, 2025
- Legislature terms: 42nd, 43rd, 44th parliaments
- Predecessor: Wynne ministry

The Ford ministry is the cabinet of the Government of Ontario currently in office. It is headed by its namesake Doug Ford, Ontario's 26th Premier, and consists of members of Progressive Conservative Party of Ontario who are concurrently elected members in the Legislative assembly of Ontario.

The Ford ministry was formed in 2018 after having ousted the incumbent Liberal Wynne ministry and won a convincing majority mandate in the 2018 Ontario general election, winning just over 60% of the seats in the 42nd Parliament of Ontario. The original twenty-one members were sworn in during a ceremony held at Queen's Park on June 29, 2018. Since 2018, the Ford ministry has twice renewed their governing mandate from the electorate, respectively in June 2022 and February 2025.

With 37 members, the Ford ministry is the largest cabinet in Ontario's history, substantively exceeding previous record of 33 members. It first broke the record in June 2024 when it was expanded from 30 members to 36 members, and reached further height of 37 members two months later. Despite its size, it consists of fewer women than its predecessors Wynne, McGuinty and Rae ministries. Its expanded rank however boasts the largest contingent of visible minority ministers in Ontario ministry, a record set in September 2023.

With the exception of 2020, Premier Ford had carried out one major cabinet shuffle each year since 2018, most often in June. The most recent major shuffle took place in September 2026, shortly after a set of three by-elections during which the government retained two seats vacated by former minister.

== Current composition ==
The current composition of the Ford ministry was largely set by a major cabinet shuffle carried out on September 10, 2026, when three new ministers taking the places of three ministers departed over the summer months and six incumbent ministers assuming new roles. The shuffle return the ministry's rank to its record 37 members, the largest cabinet in Ontario history.

Explanatory notes: Assumed office and Entered ministry: contain years correspond to the major cabinet shuffles that took place on the follow date, unless otherwise noted.

During 42nd Parliament
- June 29, 2018
- June 20, 2019
- June 18, 2021
During 43rd Parliament
- June 24, 2022
- September 4, 2023
- June 6, 2024
During 44th Parliament (current)
- March 19, 2025
- September 10, 2026

Ordering: Per Ministry of Intergovernmental Affairs' Ontario order of precedence, members of the council are to be ordered "in accordance with the precedence document issued by the Cabinet Office", but no such documents is currently made public. Previous version of the document follow ordering similar to that in the Table of Precedence of Canada, primarily by the date a member first joined council, followed by the date of their first election to the legislature. This table is ordered as such.)

Minister	Portfolio	Assumed office	Entered ministry	First elected
Doug Ford	Premier & President of the Council	2018	2018	2018
Doug Ford	Minister of Intergovernmental Affairs	2018	2018	2018
Sylvia Jones	Deputy Premier	2022	2018	2007
Sylvia Jones	Minister of Health	2022	2018	2007
Vic Fedeli	Chair of Cabinet	2018	2018	2011
Vic Fedeli	Minister of Economic Development, Job Creation and Trade	2019	2018	2011
Lisa Thompson	Minister of Rural Affairs	2021	2018	2011
Raymond Cho	Minister for Seniors and Accessibility	2018	2018	2016 (Note: Won in a by-election.)
Peter Bethlenfalvy	Minister of Finance	2020 (Note: December 31, 2020, following the resignation of Rod Phillips.)	2018	2018
Greg Rickford	Minister of Indigenous Affairs and First Nations Economic Reconciliation	2018	2018	2018 (Note: Previously served in the House of Commons from 2008 to 2015.)
Greg Rickford	Minister Responsible for Ring of Fire Economic and Community Partnerships	2025	2018	2018
Doug Downey	Attorney General	2019	2019	2018
Paul Calandra	Minister of Education	2025	2019	2018
Jill Dunlop	Minister of Emergency Preparedness and Response	2025	2019	2018
Stephen Lecce	Minister of Energy and Mines	2025	2019	2018
Prabmeet Sarkaria	Minister of Transportation	2023	2019	2018
Kinga Surma	President of the Treasury Board	2026	2019	2018
David Piccini	Minister of Infrastructure	2026	2021	2018
Michael Parsa	Minister of Children, Community and Social Services	2023 (Note: March 24, 2023, following the resignation of Merrilee Fullerton.)	2022	2018
Michael Kerzner	Solicitor General of Ontario	2022	2022	2022
George Pirie	Minister of Northern Economic Development and Growth	2025	2022	2022
Rob Flack	Minister of Municipal Affairs and Housing	2025	2023	2022
Todd McCarthy	Minister of the Environment, Conservation and Parks	2025	2023	2022
Andrea Khanjin	Minister of Red Tape Reduction	2025	2023 (Note: September 22, 2023, following the resignation of Monte McNaughton.)	2018
Sam Oosterhoff	Minister of Agriculture, Food and Agribusiness	2026	2024	2016
Stephen Crawford	Minister of Public and Business Service Delivery and Procurement	2025	2024	2018
Mike Harris Jr.	Minister of Natural Resources	2025	2024	2018
Natalia Kusendova-Bashta	Minister of Long-Term Care	2024	2024	2018
Natalia Kusendova-Bashta	Minister of Francophone Affairs	2026	2024	2018
Trevor Jones	Minister of Labour, Immigration, Training and Skills Development	2026	2024	2022
Nolan Quinn	Minister of Colleges, Universities, Research Excellence and Security	2025	2024	2022
Graham McGregor	Minister of Citizenship and Multiculturalism	2025	2024 (Note: August 16, 2024, following the resignation of Todd Smith.)	2022
Michael Tibollo	Associate Attorney General	2025	2018	2018
Nina Tangri	Associate Minister of Small Business	2023	2021	2018
Charmaine Williams	Associate Minister of Women’s Social and Economic Opportunity	2022	2022	2022
Graydon Smith	Associate Minister of Municipal Affairs and Housing	2025	2022	2022
Vijay Thanigasalam	Associate Minister of Artificial Intelligence Adoption	2026	2023	2018
Kevin Holland	Associate Minister of Forestry and Forest Products	2025	2024	2022
Zee Hamid	Minister of Tourism, Culture and Gaming	2026	2025	2024
Brian Saunderson	Minister of Sport	2026	2026	2022
Matthew Rae	Associate Minister of Energy-Intensive Industries	2026	2026	2022
Michelle Cooper	Associate Minister of Mental Health and Addictions	2026	2026	2025

== History ==
=== 2018 ===
The cabinet was sworn in by Lieutenant Governor Elizabeth Dowdeswell on June 29. The cabinet featured Ford as Premier and Minister of Intergovernmental Affairs with former Progressive Conservative leadership candidates Christine Elliott as Deputy Premier and Minister of Health, and Caroline Mulroney as Attorney General. Former interim leaders of the Progressive Conservatives Vic Fedeli and Jim Wilson were assigned to be Minister of Finance and Minister of Economic Development, respectively. This initial cabinet also featured Lisa MacLeod as both Minister of Community and Social Services and Minister of Children and Youth Services, Lisa Thompson as Minister of Education, Rod Phillips as Minister of the Environment, and John Yakabuski as Minister of Transportation. The first change to the cabinet came on November 2, 2018, when Jim Wilson resigned to sit as an independent and Todd Smith assumed his role as Minister of Economic Development.

=== 2019 ===
The first major cabinet shuffle came on June 20, 2019, as the premier expanded the cabinet to 28 members. Doug Downey, Paul Calandra, Stephen Lecce and Ross Romano were promoted to cabinet to be Attorney General, Government House Leader, Minister of Education, and Minister of Training, Colleges and Universities, respectively. Jill Dunlop, Kinga Surma, and Prabmeet Sarkaria were promoted to be Associate Ministers. Rod Phillips became Minister of Finance, Jeff Yurek the Minister of the Environment, Todd Smith the Minister of Children and Youth Services, Caroline Mulroney the Minister of Transportation, Vic Fedeli the Minister of Economic Development, Lisa Thompson the Minister of Government and Consumer Services, Lisa MacLeod the Minister of Tourism, Culture and Sport, Laurie Scott the Minister of Infrastructure, and Monte McNaughton the Minister of Labour. Bill Walker and Michael Tibollo were demoted from ministerial positions to be Associate Ministers, and Christine Elliott's portfolio split with Merrilee Fullerton taking over the newly created Ministry of Long-Term Care.

=== 2021 ===
In February 2021, Peter Bethlenfalvy replaced Rod Phillips as Minister of Finance following criticism of his international vacations during the COVID-19 pandemic, though he returned to cabinet in June as the Minister of Long-Term Care.

That June shuffle removed 5 veteran members — Jeff Yurek, John Yakabuski, Laurie Scott, Bill Walker, and Ernie Hardeman — all having served since 2018 and toiled for years on the opposition bench (Hardeman in particular was the most senior member of caucus and the only member of the ministry who have served in the Harris and Eves ministries), and replaced them with 6 new members to cabinet, including David Piccini as Minister of the Environment, Parm Gill as Minister of Citizenship and Multiculturalism, Khaleed Rasheed as Associate Minister of Digital Government, Stan Cho as Associate Minister of Transportation, Nina Tangri as Associate Minister for Small Business and Red Tape Reduction, and Jane McKenna as the Associate Minister of Children and Women's Issues. Kinga Surma and Jill Dunlop were promoted from their associate minister roles to be Minister of Infrastructure and Minister of Colleges and Universities, respectively, with Prabmeet Sakaria being promoted from associate minister to President of the Treasury Board. She shuffle bring the cabinet to 29 members, one shy of the previous record set by the Wynne ministry in 2016.

=== 2022 ===
Ford conducted an extensive cabinet shuffle following his government re-election in the 2022 Ontario general election. The most significant appointment was naming Sylvia Jones as Deputy Premier and Minister of Health, the single largest portfolio in the government. These roles were previously held by Christine Elliott, Ford's leadership rival who retired from politics at that year's election. Most senior ministers retained their portfolio, though the shuffle ousted Lisa McLeod who had been dogged by controversies, and Ross Romano, both members with experience from opposition years, and saw Greg Rickford, once simultaneously held all resource portfolio, relinquished the mining brief, after having lost the energy brief a year prior. The shuffle also brought six rookie MPPs into cabinet, including Ford's nephew Michael as Minister of Citizenship and Multiculturalism. While Michael Ford's appointment drew much expected derision and invited comparison to cardinal-nephews appointed by Renaissance era popes, he actually came with more political experience than most of his rookie peers given service as a Toronto municipal elected official. This shuffle brought his cabinet to 30 members, the same number as previous record on size.

=== 2023 ===
Earlier in the year, a minor shuffle occurred following the resignation of Merrilee Fullerton, with Michael Parsa replacing her.

Ford conducted two shuffles in September 2023. A major cabinet shuffle was held following the fallout due to the Greenbelt scandal. Housing minister Steve Clark resigned and Stan Cho was added to cabinet.

Weeks later, another cabinet shuffle took place following the resignations of Monte McNaughton and Kaleed Rasheed. Andrea Khanjin and Todd McCarthy were added to cabinet. The shuffle also added Vijay Thanigasalam as an associated minister, pushing the number of minister to 31. With this, the Ford ministry officially set the record as the largest cabinet in Ontario history.

=== 2024 ===
On June 6, 2024, on the last day of sitting before the summer break, Doug Ford conducted a major Cabinet shuffle, surprising his caucus, the media, and the public. Ford expanded the size of cabinet to 36 members, again setting the record for the largest cabinet in Ontario history, changing the portfolios of many ministers and adding many Parliamentary Assistants to the cabinet without removing a current minister from cabinet. The new additions to the team included Sam Oosterhoff, Stephen Crawford, Nolan Quinn, Natalia Kusendova-Bashta, Mike Harris Jr. (Son of former PC premier Mike Harris Sr.), and Trevor Jones. The cabinet shuffle also included the addition of former Minister of Housing Steve Clark as Government House leader, who serves outside of the ministry.

In response to the unexpected resignation of veteran minister Todd Smith, one of only a handful of minister remaining with experience from opposition years, Ford conducted a small scale shuffle that impacted two of the largest budget portfolio in the government in August 2024. Smith's crucial education brief, which he only assumed two months prior, was assigned to Jill Dunlop, who in turn handed her brief for higher education to Nolan Quinn who was elevated from junior minister rank. The shuffle also saw the entry of Kevin Holland and Graham McGregor as associate ministers, thus expanding cabinet size to 37, breaking the record for the third time for leading the largest cabinet in Ontario history.

=== 2025 ===
This cabinet shuffle was held following the 2025 Ontario general election. The shuffle saw no departure and only one new member, Zee Hamid, who first won his Milton seat in a May 2024 byelection, entering ministry. The most significant changes were with the education, environment, and the much battered municipal affairs & housing portfolios. Paul Calandra, who had been assigned to politically sensitive portfolios as the fixer following negative media attention to government and was viewed as having deftly managed a number of files, most recently at municipal affairs, was given education, the second largest ministry in terms of budget, and one of the most top of voters' mind portfolio, became Ford's fifth education minister. Rob Flack and Todd McCarthy, both first elected in 2022 and entered ministry in September 2023, were respectively given the municipal affairs and environment portfolio. Two ministers, both with fathers who were former PC members, were involved also shuffled. Incumbent education minister Jill Dunlop was named the inaugural minister of the newly created Ministry of Emergency Preparedness, while Mike Harris Jr. took on natural resources portfolio, one of the five original briefs in Ontario ministry. Two senior ministers who served in the federal Conservative government of Stephan Harper, saw significant, if subtle, changes to their brief. Greg Rickford, the only member of ministry who have served in federal cabinet and once the Tsar of all resources portfolios in the Ford ministry, again shed a portion of his brief, transferring northern development to George Pirie, who lost his mining portfolio, a substantial economic brief, to energy minister Stephan Lecce as an additional brief.

=== 2026 ===
On May 25, Ford's one-time leadership rival Caroline Mulroney announced her plan to resign from both cabinet and the legislature when the house adjourn for the summer the following week. At the time of her resignation, she was the only minister other than the Premier heading two actual permanent ministries with enabling legislations. Upon her resignation taking effect on June 5. Mulroney's two portfolios, treasury and francophone affairs, were distributed to finance minister Peter Bethlenfalvy and long-term care minister Natalia Kusendova-Bashta respectively.While Kusendova-Bashta was not a francophone she is a rarity within the PC caucus for her fluent command of the language and meaningful understanding of the francophone community from previous work. Her appointment was well received by the francophone stakeholders community. With Mulroney's departure, seven original members of the ministry remained in cabinet.

In mid July, it was revealed that tourism minister Stan Cho has charged $16,000 to public accounts for overnight stays in luxury Toronto hotels despite residing only six kilometres, or seven subway stops, from the legislature, and was provided with a government chauffer. The practice is allowed for MPP residing in Toronto under "special or unusual circumstances", and Cho claimed he incurred expenses for accommodation due to late night sitting at the legislature, despite having made claims during months in which the legislature held no evening sittings. Cho's resignation from cabinet on July 17 was quickly followed by additional revelation of Cho having charged more than $84,000 to his local Conservative association, funded by political donations incentivized by refundable tax-credit, for hospitality expenses that seeming with little to do with electoral purposes ranging from meals at high end restaurants to luxury hotel stays to private suites at sports games. While Premier Ford indignantly called Cho's conduct "unacceptable", the episode served as a unwelcome reminder of the Premier's own purchase of a private jet in April which he was forced to reverse after public uproar, the reversal itself costing public account of nearly $200,000. The matter also draw unwanted attention to at least four other cabinet members residing in Greater Toronto Area who have charged less extravagant amount for hotel stays.

On the same day Cho announced his resignation, sports minister Neil Lumsden also announced his intention to retired on August 4 from both the legislature and cabinet.

== List of ministers ==
=== By seniority ===
First entered ministry during Harris ministry Involuntary departure minister without portfolio/associate minister

Minister	Ministerial service			Parliamentary Service		
Minister	Start	End	Note	Year	Electoral district	Region
Doug Ford	June 29, 2018			2018	Etobicoke North	Toronto
Jim Wilson	June 26, 1995; June 29, 2018	Nov 2, 2018	(Note: resigned from cabinet amidst scandal/public outcry)	1990	Simcoe—Grey	Central
Ernie Hardeman	June 17, 1999; June 29, 2018	June 18, 2021	(Note: exited ministry at shuffle)	1995	Oxford	Southwest
John Yakabuski	June 29, 2018	June 18, 2021		2003	Renfrew—Nipissing—Pembroke	East
Laurie Scott	June 29, 2018	June 18, 2021		2003 (Note: not in parliament 2009-2011, resigned seat to allow party leader John Tory to seek election)	Haliburton—Kawartha Lakes—Brock	Central
Lisa MacLeod	June 29, 2018	June 24, 2022		2006 (Note: byelection)	Nepean	East
Christine Elliott	June 29, 2018	June 24, 2022	(Note: stood down at preceding general election)	2006 (Note: byelection; not in parliament 2015-2018)	Newmarket—Aurora	905 North
Sylvia Jones	June 29, 2018			2007	Dufferin—Caledon	Central
Steve Clark	June 29, 2018	Sep 4, 2023		2010	Leeds—Grenville—etc.	East
Victor Fedeli	June 29, 2018			2011	Nipissing	North
Monte McNaughton	June 29, 2018	Sep 22, 2023		2011	Lambton—Kent—Middlesex	Southwest
Todd Smith	June 29, 2018	Aug 16, 2024		2011	Bay of Quinte	Central
Lisa Thompson	June 29, 2018			2011	Huron—Bruce	SW-Midwest
Jeff Yurek	June 29, 2018	June 18, 2021		2011	Elgin—Middlesex—London	Southwest
Raymond Cho	June 29, 2018			2016	Scarborough North	Toronto
Peter Bethlenfalvy	June 29, 2018			2018	Pickering—Uxbridge	905 East
Merrilee Fullerton	June 29, 2018	March 24, 2023		2018	Carleton	East
Caroline Mulroney	June 29, 2018	June 5, 2026		2018	York—Simcoe	905 North
Rod Phillips	June 29, 2018	Dec 31, 2020		2018	Ajax	905 East
Rod Phillips	June 18, 2021	Jan 14, 2022		2018	Ajax	905 East
Greg Rickford	June 29, 2018			2018	Kenora—Rainy River	North
Michael Tibollo	June 29, 2018		(Note: entered ministry as portfolio minister, demoted to associate minister rank June 20, 2019)	2018	Vaughan—Woodbridge	905 North
Bill Walker	Nov 5, 2018	June 18, 2021		2011	Bruce—Grey—Owen Sound	SW-Midwest
Ross Romano	June 20, 2019	June 24, 2022		2017	Sault Ste. Marie	North
Paul Calandra	June 20, 2019		(Note: entered ministry as associate minister, promoted to portfolio minister October 19, 2021)	2018	Markham—Stouffville	905 North
Doug Downey	June 20, 2019			2018	Barrie—Springwater—Oro-Medonte	Central
Jill Dunlop	June 20, 2019			2018	Simcoe North	Central
Stephen Lecce	June 20, 2019			2018	King—Vaughan	905 North
Prabmeet Sarkaria	June 20, 2019		(Note: entered ministry as associate minister, promoted to portfolio minister June 18, 2021)	2018	Brampton South	905 West
Kinga Surma	June 20, 2019			2018	Etobicoke Centre	Toronto
Jane McKenna	June 18, 2021	June 24, 2022	(Note: associated minister rank)	2011	Burlington	905 West
Stan Cho	June 18, 2021	July 17, 2026	(Note: entered ministry as associate minister, promoted to portfolio minister Sept 2023)	2018	Willowdale	Toronto
Parm Gill	June 18, 2021	Jan 26, 2024		2018	Milton	905 West
David Piccini	June 18, 2021			2018	Northumberland—Peterborough S.	Central
Kaleed Rasheed	June 18, 2021	Sep 20, 2023		2018	Mississauga East—Cooksville	905 West
Nina Tangri	June 18, 2021	June 24, 2022		2018	Mississauga—Streetsville	905 West
Nina Tangri	March 24, 2023			2018	Mississauga—Streetsville	905 West
Michael Parsa	June 24, 2022		(Note: entered ministry as associate minister, promoted to portfolio minister March 24, 2023)	2018	Aurora—Oak Ridges—Richmond Hill	905 North
Michael Ford	June 24, 2022	March 19, 2025		2022	York South—Weston	Toronto
Michael Kerzner	June 24, 2022			2022	York Centre	Toronto
Neil Lumsden	June 24, 2022	August 4, 2026		2022	Hamilton East—Stoney Creek	905 West
George Pirie	June 24, 2022			2022	Timmins	North
Graydon Smith	June 24, 2022		(Note: demoted to associate minister rank March 19, 2025)	2022	Parry Sound—Muskoka	Central
Charmaine Williams	June 24, 2022			2022	Brampton Centre	905 West
Rob Flack	Sep 4, 2023			2022	Elgin—Middlesex—London	Southwest
Todd McCarthy	Sep 4, 2023		(Note: entered ministry as associate minister, promoted to portfolio minister two weeks later on September 20. 2023)	2022	Durham	905 East
Andrea Khanjin	Sep 22, 2023			2018	Barrie—Innisfil	Central
Vijay Thanigasalam	Sep 22, 2023			2018	Scarborough—Rouge Park	Toronto
Sam Oosterhoff	June 6, 2024			2016	Niagara West	905 West
Stephen Crawford	June 6, 2024		(Note: entered ministry as associate minister, promoted to portfolio minister March 19. 2025)	2018	Oakville	905 West
Mike Harris	June 6, 2024			2018	Kitchener—Conestoga	SW-Midwest
Natalia Kusendova-Bashta	June 6, 2024			2018	Mississauga Centre	905 West
Trevor Jones	June 6, 2024			2022	Chatham-Kent—Leamington	Southwest
Nolan Quinn	June 6, 2024		(Note: entered ministry as associate minister, promoted to portfolio minister two months later on August 16, 2024)	2022	Stormont—Dundas—S.Glengarry	East
Kevin Holland	Aug 16, 2024			2022	Thunder Bay—Atikokan	North
Graham McGregor	Aug 16, 2024			2022	Brampton North	905 West
Zee Hamid	March 19, 2025			2024	Milton	905 West
Matthew Rae	Sep 10, 2026			2022	Perth—Wellington	Southwest
Brian Saunderson	Sep 10, 2026			2022	Simcoe—Grey	Central
Michelle Cooper	Sep 10, 2026			2025	Eglinton—Lawrence	Toronto

=== By portfolios ===
Groupings of portfolios: notional/informal and solely for ease of review Line separations:

- solid lines divide between traditionally distinct portfolios within a related sector/grouping
- dashed lines divide between titles of distinct roles in the same portfolio/policy area
- titles separated by faint gridlines infers they are successor roles of each other, i.e. substantially the same role with changed title

Portfolio/position non-portfolio assignemnts associate minister (Note: minister without portfolio styled as such)	Minister	Tenure	
Portfolio/position non-portfolio assignemnts associate minister	Minister	Start	End
Central administration & citizenship portfolios
Premier & President of the Council	Doug Ford	June 29, 2018	Present
Minister of Intergovernmental Affairs	Doug Ford	June 29, 2018	Present
Deputy Premier	Christine Elliott	June 29, 2018	June 24, 2022
Deputy Premier	Sylvia Jones	June 24, 2022	Present
Minister of Finance	Vic Fedeli	June 29, 2018	June 20, 2019
Minister of Finance	Rod Phillips	June 20, 2019	Dec 31, 2020
Minister of Finance	Peter Bethlenfalvy	Dec 31, 2020	Present
Associate Minister of Digital Government	Kaleed Rasheed	June 18, 2021	June 24, 2022
President of the Treasury Board	Peter Bethlenfalvy	June 29, 2018	June 18, 2021
President of the Treasury Board	Prabmeet Sarkaria	June 18, 2021	Sep 4, 2023
President of the Treasury Board	Caroline Mulroney	Sep 4, 2023	June 5, 2026
President of the Treasury Board	Peter Bethlenfalvy	June 5, 2026	Sep 10, 2026
President of the Treasury Board	Kinga Surma	Sep 10, 2026	Present
Minister of Citizenship and Multiculturalism	Parm Gill	June 18, 2021	June 24, 2022
Minister of Citizenship and Multiculturalism	Michael Ford	June 24, 2022	March 19, 2025
Minister of Citizenship and Multiculturalism	Graham McGregor	March 19, 2025	Present
Minister of Francophone Affairs (Note: styled erroneously as Minister Responsible for Francophone Affairs until November 26, 2018)	Caroline Mulroney	June 29, 2018	June 5, 2026
Minister of Francophone Affairs	Natalia Kusendova-Bashta	June 5, 2026	Present
Minister of Indigenous Affairs	Greg Rickford	June 29, 2018	June 6, 2024
Minister of Indigenous Affairs and First Nations Economic Reconciliation	Greg Rickford	June 6, 2024	Present
Justice and law enforcement portfolios
Attorney General	Caroline Mulroney	June 29, 2018	June 20, 2019
Attorney General	Doug Downey	June 20, 2019	Present
Associate Attorney General	Michael Tibollo	March 19, 2025	Present
Minister of Community Safety and Correctional Services	Michael Tibollo	June 29, 2018	Nov 5, 2018
Minister of Community Safety and Correctional Services	Sylvia Jones	Nov 5, 2018	April 4, 2019
Solicitor General	Sylvia Jones	April 4, 2019	June 24, 2022
Solicitor General	Michael Kerzner	June 24, 2022	Present
Associate Minister of Auto Theft and Bail Reform	Graham McGregor	August 16, 2024	March 19, 2025
Associate Solicitor General for Auto Theft and Bail Reform	Zee Hamid	March 19, 2025	Present
Associate Minister of Emergency Preparedness and Response	Trevor Jones	June 6, 2024	March 19, 2025
Minister of Emergency Preparedness and Response	Jill Dunlop	March 19, 2025	Present
Economic development & industry portfolios
Minister of Agriculture, Food and Rural Affairs	Ernie Hardeman	June 29, 2018	June 18, 2021
Minister of Agriculture, Food and Rural Affairs	Lisa Thompson	June 18, 2021	June 6, 2024
Minister of Agriculture, Food and Agribusiness (Note: For five days, June 6 to 11, 2024, styled as "Minister of Farming, Agriculture, and Agribusiness")	Rob Flack	June 6, 2024	March 19, 2025
Minister of Agriculture, Food and Agribusiness	Trevor Jones	March 19, 2025	Sep 10, 2026
Minister of Agriculture, Food and Agribusiness	Sam Oosterhoff	Sep 10, 2026	Present
Minister of Rural Affairs	Lisa Thompson	June 6, 2024	Present
Minister of Economic Development, Job Creation and Trade	Jim Wilson	June 29, 2018	Nov 2, 2018
Minister of Economic Development, Job Creation and Trade	Todd Smith	Nov 2, 2018	June 20, 2019
Minister of Economic Development, Job Creation and Trade	Vic Fedeli	June 20, 2019	Present
Associate Minister of Red Tape Reduction	Prabmeet Sarkaria	June 20, 2019	June 18, 2021
Associate Minister of Small Business and Red Tape Reduction	Nina Tangri	June 18, 2021	June 24, 2022
Minister of Red Tape Reduction (Note: The ministry a transitory entity created by Order in Council 1207/2022 with no enabling legislation)	Parm Gill	June 24, 2022	Jan 26, 2024
Minister of Red Tape Reduction	title not in use	Jan 26, 2024	June 6, 2024
Minister of Red Tape Reduction	Mike Harris Jr.	June 6, 2024	March 19, 2025
Minister of Red Tape Reduction	Andrea Khanjin	March 19, 2025	Present
Associate Minister of Small Business	Nina Tangri	Sep 4, 2023	Present
Minister of Tourism, Culture and Sport	Sylvia Jones	June 29, 2018	Nov 5, 2018
Minister of Tourism, Culture and Sport	Michael Tibollo	Nov 5, 2018	June 20, 2019
Minister of Tourism, Culture and Sport	Lisa MacLeod	June 20, 2019	Oct 21, 2019
Minister of Heritage, Sport, Tourism and Culture Industries	Lisa MacLeod	Oct 21, 2019	June 24, 2022
Minister of Tourism, Culture and Sport	Neil Lumsden	June 24, 2022	June 6, 2024
Minister of Tourism, Culture and Gaming	Stan Cho	June 6, 2024	July 17, 2026
Minister of Tourism, Culture and Gaming	Doug Downey (acting)	July 21, 2026	Sep 10, 2026
Minister of Tourism, Culture and Gaming	Zee Hamid	Sep 10, 2026	Present
Minister of Sport	Neil Lumsden	June 6, 2024	August 4, 2026
Minister of Sport	Doug Downey (acting)	August 4, 2026	Sep 10, 2026
Minister of Sport	Brian Saunderson	Sep 10, 2026	Present
Social and human services portfolios
Minister of Children, Community and Social Services	Lisa MacLeod	June 29, 2018	June 20, 2019
Minister of Children, Community and Social Services	Todd Smith	June 20, 2019	June 18, 2021
Minister of Children, Community and Social Services	Merrilee Fullerton	June 18, 2021	March 24, 2023
Minister of Children, Community and Social Services	Michael Parsa	March 24, 2023	Present
Minister Responsible for Women's Issues	Lisa MacLeod	June 29, 2018	June 20, 2019
Associate Minister of Children and Women's Issues	Jill Dunlop	June 20, 2019	June 18, 2021
Associate Minister of Children and Women's Issues	Jane McKenna	June 18, 2021	June 24, 2022
Associate Minister of Women's Social and Economic Opportunity	Charmaine Williams	June 24, 2022	Present
Minister of Health and Long-Term Care	Christine Elliott	June 29, 2018	June 20, 2019
Minister of Health	Christine Elliott	June 20, 2019	June 24, 2022
Minister of Health	Sylvia Jones	June 24, 2022	Present
Minister of Long-Term Care	Merrilee Fullerton	June 20, 2019	June 18, 2021
Minister of Long-Term Care	Rod Phillips	June 18, 2021	Jan 14, 2022
Minister of Long-Term Care	Paul Calandra	Jan 14, 2022	Sep 4, 2023
Minister of Long-Term Care	Stan Cho	Sep 4, 2023	June 6, 2024
Minister of Long-Term Care	Natalia Kusendova-Bashta	June 6, 2024	Present
Associate Minister of Mental Health and Addictions	Michael Tibollo	June 20, 2019	March 19, 2025
Associate Minister of Mental Health and Addictions	Vijay Thanigasalam	March 19, 2025	Present
Minister for Seniors and Accessibility	Raymond Cho	June 29, 2018	Present
Minister of Training, Colleges and Universities	Merrilee Fullerton	June 29, 2018	June 20, 2019
Minister of Training, Colleges and Universities	Ross Romano	June 20, 2019	Oct 21, 2019
Minister of Colleges and Universities	Ross Romano	Oct 21, 2019	June 18, 2021
Minister of Colleges and Universities	Jill Dunlop	June 18, 2021	August 16, 2024
Minister of Colleges and Universities	Nolan Quinn	August 16, 2024	March 19, 2025
Minister of Colleges, Universities, Research Excellence and Security	Nolan Quinn	March 19, 2025	Present
Minister of Education	Lisa Thompson	June 29, 2018	June 20, 2019
Minister of Education	Stephen Lecce	June 20, 2019	June 6, 2024
Minister of Education	Todd Smith	June 6, 2024	August 16, 2024
Minister of Education	Jill Dunlop	August 16, 2024	March 19, 2025
Minister of Education	Paul Calandra	March 19, 2025	Present
Minister of Labour	Laurie Scott	June 29, 2018	June 20, 2019
Minister of Labour	Monte McNaughton	June 20, 2019	Oct 21, 2019
Minister of Labour, Training and Skills Development	Monte McNaughton	Oct 21, 2019	June 24, 2022
Minister of Labour, Immigration, Training and Skills Development	Monte McNaughton	June 24, 2022	Sep 22, 2023
Minister of Labour, Immigration, Training and Skills Development	David Piccini	Sep 22, 2023	Sep 10, 2026
Minister of Labour, Immigration, Training and Skills Development	Trevor Jones	Sep 10, 2026	Present
Natural resources portfolios
Minister of the Environment, Conservation and Parks	Rod Phillips	June 29, 2018	June 20, 2019
Minister of the Environment, Conservation and Parks	Jeff Yurek	June 20, 2019	June 18, 2021
Minister of the Environment, Conservation and Parks	David Piccini	June 18, 2021	Sep 22, 2023
Minister of the Environment, Conservation and Parks	Andrea Khanjin	Sep 22, 2023	March 19, 2025
Minister of the Environment, Conservation and Parks	Todd McCarthy	March 19, 2025	Present
Minister of Natural Resources and Forestry	Jeff Yurek	June 29, 2018	Nov 5, 2018
Minister of Natural Resources and Forestry	John Yakabuski	Nov 5, 2018	June 18, 2021
Minister of Natural Resources and Forestry	Greg Rickford (Note: Concurrently held portfolios: Natural Resources & Forestry, Northern Development and Mines; styled as Minister of Northern Development, Mines, Natural Resources and Forestry)	June 18, 2021	June 24, 2022
Minister of Natural Resources and Forestry	Graydon Smith	June 24, 2022	June 6, 2024.
Minister of Natural Resources	Graydon Smith	June 6, 2024	March 19, 2025
Minister of Natural Resources	Mike Harris Jr.	March 19, 2025	Present
Associate Minister of Forestry and Forest Products	Nolan Quinn	June 6, 2024	August 16, 2024
Associate Minister of Forestry and Forest Products	Kevin Holland	August 16, 2024	Present
Minister of Energy, Northern Development and Mines	Greg Rickford	June 29, 2018	June 18, 2021
Minister of Northern Development, Mines, Natural Resources and Forestry	Greg Rickford	June 18, 2021	June 24, 2022
Minister of Northern Development	Greg Rickford	June 24, 2022	March 19, 2025
Minister of Northern Economic Development and Growth	George Pirie	March 19, 2025	Present
Minister of Mines	George Pirie	June 24, 2022	March 19, 2025
Associate Minister of Mines	Stephen Crawford	June 6, 2024	March 19, 2025
Minister Responsible for Ring of Fire; Economic and Community Partnerships	Greg Rickford	March 19, 2025	Present
Minister of Energy, Northern Development and Mines	Greg Rickford	June 29, 2018	June 18, 2021
Minister of Energy	Todd Smith	June 18, 2021	June 6, 2024
Minister of Energy and Electrification	Stephen Lecce	June 6, 2024	March 19, 2025
Minister of Energy and Mines	Stephen Lecce	March 19, 2025	Present
Associate Minister of Energy	Bill Walker	June 20, 2019	June 18, 2021
Associate Minister of Energy-Intensive Industries	Sam Oosterhoff	June 6, 2024	Sep 10, 2026
Associate Minister of Energy-Intensive Industries	Matthew Rae	Sep 10, 2026	Present
Public assets and services portfolios
Minister of Infrastructure	Monte McNaughton	June 29, 2018	June 20, 2019
Minister of Infrastructure	Laurie Scott	June 20, 2019	June 18, 2021
Minister of Infrastructure	Kinga Surma	June 18, 2021	Sep 10, 2026
Minister of Infrastructure	David Piccini	Sep 10, 2026	Present
Minister of Municipal Affairs and Housing	Steve Clark	June 29, 2018	Sep 4, 2023
Minister of Municipal Affairs and Housing	Paul Calandra	Sep 4, 2023	March 19, 2025
Minister of Municipal Affairs and Housing	Rob Flack	March 19, 2025	Present
Associate Minister of Housing	Michael Parsa	June 24, 2022	March 24, 2023
Associate Minister of Housing	Nina Tangri	March 24, 2023	Sep 4, 2023
Associate Minister of Housing	Rob Flack	Sep 2, 2023	June 6, 2024
Associate Minister of Housing	Vijay Thanigasalam	June 6, 2024	March 19, 2025
Associate Minister of Municipal Affairs and Housing	Graydon Smith	March 19, 2025	Present
Minister of Government and Consumer Services	Todd Smith	June 29, 2018	Nov 5, 2018
Minister of Government and Consumer Services	Bill Walker	Nov 5, 2018	June 20, 2019
Minister of Government and Consumer Services	Lisa Thompson	June 20, 2019	June 18, 2021
Minister of Government and Consumer Services	Ross Romano	June 18, 2021	June 24, 2022
Minister of Public and Business Service Delivery	Kaleed Rasheed	June 24, 2022	Sep 20, 2023
Minister of Public and Business Service Delivery	Todd McCarthy	Sep 20, 2023	June 6, 2024
Minister of Public and Business Service Delivery and Procurement	Todd McCarthy	June 6, 2024	March 19, 2025
Minister of Public and Business Service Delivery and Procurement	Stephen Crawford	March 19, 2025	Present
Minister of Transportation	John Yakabuski	June 29, 2018	Nov 5, 2018
Minister of Transportation	Jeff Yurek	Nov 5, 2018	June 20, 2019
Minister of Transportation	Caroline Mulroney	June 20, 2019	Sep 4, 2023
Minister of Transportation	Prabmeet Sarkaria	Sep 4, 2023	Present
Associate Minister of Transportation (GTA)	Kinga Surma	June 20, 2019	June 18, 2021
Associate Minister of Transportation (Transit-Oriented Communities)	Stan Cho	June 18, 2021	October 20, 2021
Associate Minister of Transportation (GTA)	Stan Cho	October 20, 2021	June 24, 2022
Associate Minister of Transportation	Stan Cho	June 24, 2022	Sep 4, 2023
Associate Minister of Transportation	Todd McCarthy	Sep 4, 2023	Sep 20, 2023
Associate Minister of Transportation	Vijay Thanigasalam	Sep 20, 2023	June 6, 2024
Parliamentary and other non-portfolio assignments
Chair of Cabinet	Vic Fedeli	June 29, 2018	Present
Minister Without Portfolio	Paul Calandra	June 20, 2019	Oct 19, 2021
Minister of Legislative Affairs (Note: Prior to summer of 2023, the minister presided over no ministry but was part of the Cabinet Office. An entity known as the "Queen’s Park Restoration Secretariat" was notionally created in the summer of 2023 for the Minister of Legislative Affairs to preside over but continued to operate within the Cabinet Office. It was disbanded in June 2024 and its responsibilities transferred to the infrastructure ministry.)	Paul Calandra	Oct 19, 2021	June 6, 2024
House Leader	Todd Smith	June 29, 2018	June 20, 2019
House Leader	Paul Calandra	June 20, 2019	June 6, 2024

=== Parliamentary roles held by non-cabinet members ===
While parliamentary roles other than the government leader had from time to time been held by cabinet members in previous ministries, since the Ford ministry took office, the roles of deputy government house leader, chief government whip, and deputy government whip had generally not been held by members of the cabinet. Incumbent of these roles upon being promoted to cabinet have all reliquished these roles within a short timeframe.

Position	Officeholder	Tenure	
Position	Officeholder	Start	End
House Leader	Steve Clark	June 6, 2024	Present (Note: Strictly speaking, caucus offices are all vacant upon the dissolution of a parliament until the return of the writ. Members who were reelected and resumed such roles would be paid their base salary for that period (as would all re-elected MPPs), but would not received the additional pay for such roles)
Deputy House Leader	Stephen Lecce	July 23, 2018	June 20, 2019
Deputy House Leader	Andrea Khanjin	Feb 11, 2020	Sep 20, 2021
Deputy House Leader	Michael Parsa	Sep 20, 2021	May 3, 2022
Deputy House Leader	Andrea Khanjin	June 30, 2022	Sep 22, 2023
Deputy House Leader	Trevor Jones (Note: elevated to cabinet 2024-06-06 when house rose for summer recess)	Sep 22, 2023	July 19, 2024
Deputy House Leader	Anthony Leardi	Jul 19, 2024 (Note: with interruption between dissolution of 43rd and reconvening of 44th parliaments)	present
Chief Government Whip	Bill Walker	July 9, 2018	Nov 5, 2018
Chief Government Whip	Lorne Coe	Nov 6, 2018	May 3, 2022
Chief Government Whip	Ross Romano	June 30, 2022	Feb 27, 2025
Chief Government Whip	Matthew Rae	April 11, 2025	Sep 28, 2026
Chief Government Whip	Effie Triantafilopoulos	Sep 28, 2026	Present
Deputy Government Whip	Doug Downey	Nov 5, 2018	June 20, 2019
Deputy Government Whip	Kaleed Rasheed	Sep 5, 2019	Sep 20, 2021
Deputy Government Whip	Michael Parsa	Sep 20, 2021	May 3, 2022
Deputy Government Whip	Todd McCarthy	June 30, 2022	Sep 22, 2023
Deputy Government Whip	Anthony Leardi	Sep 22, 2023	July 19, 2024
Deputy Government Whip	Steve Pinsonneault	April 11, 2025	Present

== Succession ==
Ministries of Ontario
Preceded by Wynne ministry	Ford ministry 2018–present	Incumbent

== See also ==
- Executive Council of Ontario
- Premiership of Doug Ford
- List of premiers of Ontario
