= Official Opposition Shadow Cabinet of the 44th Legislative Assembly of Ontario =

Official Opposition Shadow Cabinet of the 44th Parliament of Ontario
- Shadow Cabinet of Ontario
- 2025–present
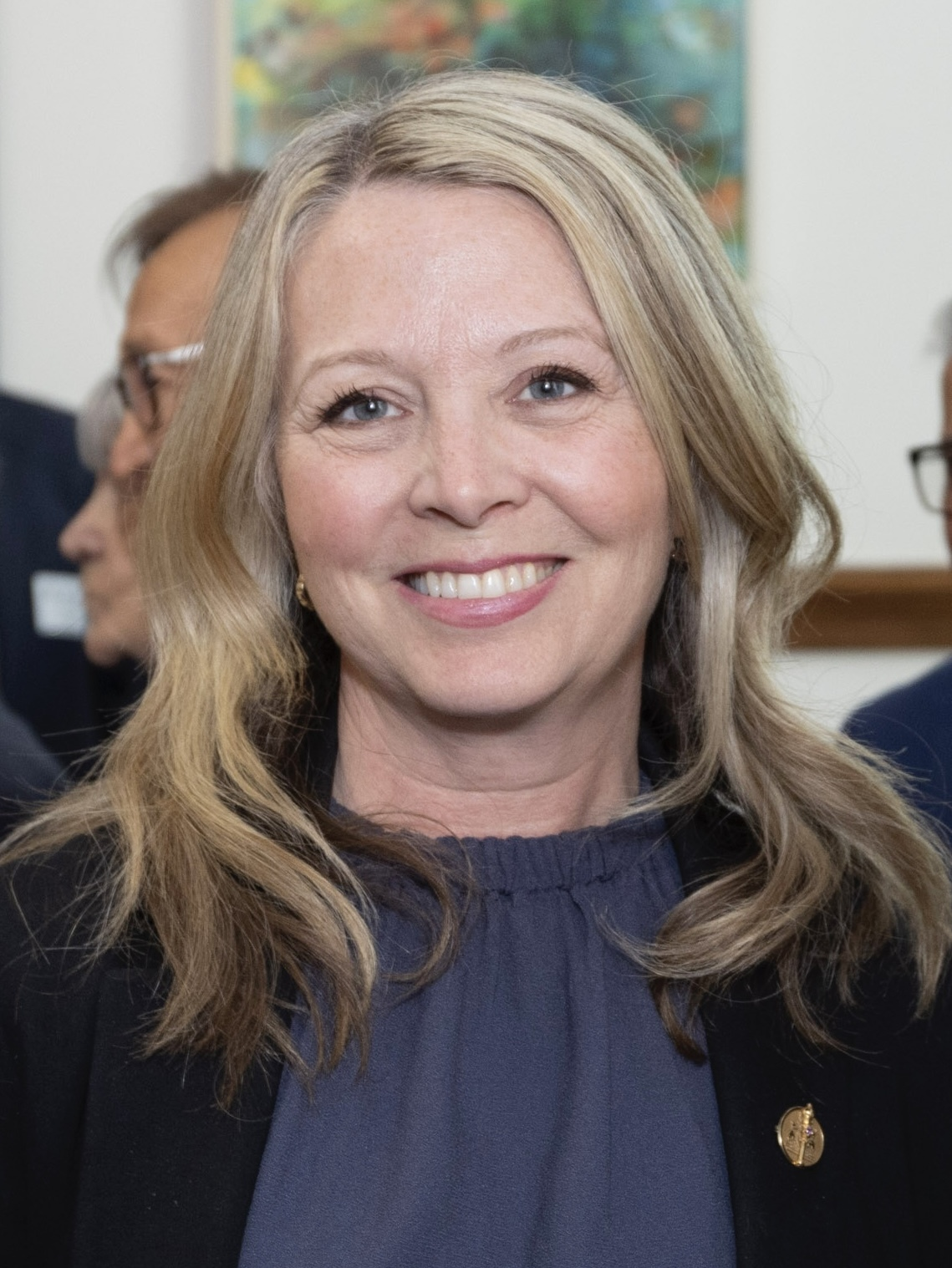
- Date formed: April 4, 2025

People and organisations
- Monarch: Charles III
- Opposition Leader: Marit Stiles
- Member party: New Democratic
- Status in legislature: Official Opposition 27 / 124 (22%)

History
- Election: 2025
- Legislature term: 44th Provincial Parliament
- Predecessor: Official Opposition Shadow Cabinet of the 43rd Legislative Assembly of Ontario

The Official Opposition Shadow Cabinet of the 44th Legislative Assembly of Ontario, Canada is the shadow cabinet of the main Opposition party, responsible for holding Ministers to account and for developing and disseminating the party's policy positions. In the 44th Legislative Assembly of Ontario, which began in 2025, the Official Opposition was formed by the Ontario New Democratic Party.

The shadow cabinet was announced by leader Marit Stiles following the 2025 Ontario general election.

Critic	Portfolio	Duration
Marit Stiles	Leader of the Opposition	2023–present
Marit Stiles	Intergovernmental Affairs	2023–present
Teresa Armstrong	Pensions	2022–present
Teresa Armstrong	Child Care	2023–present
Doly Begum	Deputy Leader	2022–2026
Doly Begum	Public Transit, Equity, and Anti-Racism	2025–2026
Jessica Bell	Finance and Treasury Board	2025–present
Guy Bourgouin	Natural Resources and Forestry	2022–present
Jeff Burch	Caucus Chair	2022–present
Jeff Burch	Municipal Affairs	2022–present
Jeff Burch	Skilled Trades	2025–present
Catherine Fife	Economic Development, Job Creation and Trade	2025–present
Jennifer French	Transportation and Infrastructure	2022–present
Wayne Gates	Long-Term Care	2022–present
France Gelinas	Health	2022–present
France Gelinas	Francophone Affairs	2025–present
Alexa Gilmour	Women’s Social and Economic Opportunity	2025–present
Alexa Gilmour	Citizenship and Multiculturalism	2025–present
Alexa Gilmour	Ontario Autism Program	2025–present
Chris Glover	Technology and Innovation	2022–present
Chris Glover	Democratic Reform	2023–present
Chris Glover	Sport	2025–present
Lisa Gretzky	Children, Community and Social Services	2025–present
Terence Kernaghan	Deputy Whip	2025–present
Terence Kernaghan	Small Business, Non-Profits and the Arts	2025–present
Robin Lennox	Mental Health and Addictions, Primary Care	2025–present
Sol Mamakwa	Deputy Leader	2022–present
Sol Mamakwa	Indigenous and Treaty Relations, Northern Economic Development, Growth	2022–present
Catherine McKenney	Housing	2025–present
Chandra Pasma	Education	2022–present
Chandra Pasma	Deputy House Leader	2025–present
Tom Rakocevic	Public and Business Service Delivery and Procurement, Auto Insurance Reform	2025–present
Peggy Sattler	Chief Whip	2023–present
Peggy Sattler	Colleges, Universities, Research Excellence and Security	2023–present
Sandy Shaw	Tourism, Culture and Gaming	2025–present
Jennie Stevens	Veterans, Legion and Military Affairs	2022–present
Jennie Stevens	Solicitor General	2025–present
Peter Tabuns	Environment, Conservation and Parks, Emergency Preparedness and Response	2025–present
John Vanthof	Opposition House Leader	2022–present
John Vanthof	Agriculture, Food, Agribusiness and Rural Affairs	2022–present
Lise Vaugeois	Seniors	2022–present
Lise Vaugeois	WSIB & Injured Workers	2023–present
Jamie West	Deputy Whip	2025–present
Jamie West	Labour	2022–present
Jamie West	Energy and Mines	2025–present
Kristyn Wong-Tam	Attorney General, 2SLGBTQ+ Issues	2022–present

== See also ==
- Executive Council of Ontario
- Ford Ministry
