= Greenbelt scandal =

Political scandal in Canada

In June 2018, Doug Ford, then-political candidate and now premier of Ontario, was featured in a leaked video promising preferential access to Greenbelt land to real estate developers. The ensuing political scandal led to an investigation by the Ontario Provincial Police, who later referred the case to the Royal Canadian Mounted Police following conflict of interest concerns.

In 2023, several cabinet ministers resigned following an investigation by the integrity commissioner, including housing minister Steve Clark and public business and service delivery minister Kaleed Rasheed. Ultimately, Ford would reverse the changes made to development rules in the Greenbelt nature reserve following his 2022 reelection.

== Background ==
Shortly before the 2018 Ontario general election, a leaked video of Progressive Conservative Party politician Doug Ford showed him promising that he would "open up a 'big chunk' of the protected area", a nature reserve in Southern Ontario's Golden Horseshoe region, to real estate developers. In response to widespread criticism, Ford claimed that he had reversed his position and would not modify the area.

== Controversy ==
Following a successful re-election campaign in the 2022 Ontario general election, the Government of Premier Ford shifted 7,400 acres (3,000 ha) outside the Greenbelt reserve, while adding 9,400 acres (3,800 ha) of land into the environmentally protected area in December 2022. The decision led to a political scandal, as some real estate developers had purchased property in the Greenbelt reserve shortly before the changes were announced. Furthermore, some of the implicated developers had attended Ford's daughter's August 2022 pre-wedding party, which Ford defended based on the preclearance he had received from the province's Integrity Commissioner in January 2022.

Seven companies owned by the De Gasperis family, including Tacc Construction, Arista Homes, and Leslie Elgin Developments, had planned to build in Richmond Hill, Ontario. President Michael Rice of Green Lane Bathurst planned to begin building in King, Ontario, President Marcelo Perez-Hassaf of Torca II announced construction projects in Stouffville through their 2502536 Ontario numbered company, Flato Upper Markham Village and Minotar Holdings held sites in Markham, President Peter Tanenbaum of Nash Road Developments announced construction projects in Clarington, and a Chinese firm based in Fuyang announced plans to build in Ajax.

The Ontario Provincial Police transferred its anti-racketeering investigation to the Royal Canadian Mounted Police (RCMP) in August 2023 to avoid a conflict of interest. In October 2023, the RCMP announced they were opening a criminal investigation into whether Ford's changes corruptly favoured certain developers.

In August 2023, the Auditor General of Ontario released a report detailing how the provincial government's approvals had favoured certain developers that stood to earn over $8 billion, while failing to consider the developments' environmental, agricultural, and financial impacts.

=== Fallout ===
Housing Minister Steve Clark resigned in September 2023 after the province's Integrity Commissioner concluded that he had violated ethics rules in his approvals of real estate development projects. While announcing his resignation, he resisted calls from First Nations representatives seeking traditional territories to be returned to the Greenbelt. Later that month, Public and Business Service Delivery Minister Kaleed Rasheed resigned over his relationship with a developer involved in the Greenbelt scandal. Clark and Rasheed's resignations led Ford to reverse his changes, announcing that he would instead encourage building within existing urban areas.

In August 2023, the Toronto Star filed for an FOI to Ontario's Integrity Commissioner to make the emails of Ryan Amato, Steve Clark's former Chief of Staff, available to the public. In April 2025, the Integrity Commissioner ruled in favour of the Toronto Star's request. Due to the ruling, Amato has until June 11, 2025 to provide his emails or an affidavit attesting no such emails exist.

== Reversal ==
In October 2023, Clark's successor as Housing Minister, Paul Calandra, introduced a bill to restore the Greenbelt's original boundaries and require future changes to be approved by the Ontario Legislative Assembly, which was passed in December 2023.

== See also ==
- Ontario minister's zoning orders controversy
