= Kaleed Rasheed =

Canadian politician (born 1982)

The Honourable Kaleed Rasheed ECO
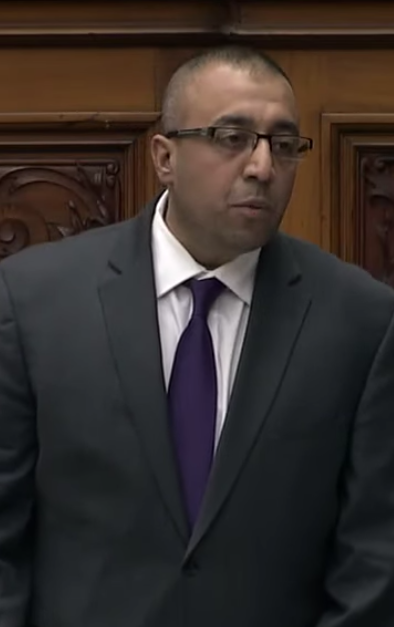
- Rasheed in 2019.

Ontario Minister of Public and Business Service Delivery
- In office June 24, 2022 – September 20, 2023
- Premier: Doug Ford
- Preceded by: Ross Romano (as Minister of Government and Consumer Services)
- Succeeded by: Todd McCarthy

Ontario Associate Minister of Digital Government
- In office June 28, 2019 – June 24, 2022
- Premier: Doug Ford
- Preceded by: Position created
- Succeeded by: Position dissolved

Member of the Ontario Provincial Parliament for Mississauga East—Cooksville
- In office June 7, 2018 – January 28, 2025
- Preceded by: Dipika Damerla
- Succeeded by: Silvia Gualtieri

Personal details
- Born: June 15, 1982 (age 44) Pakistan
- Party: Independent (since 2023)
- Other political affiliations: Ontario Progressive Conservative (2018– 2023)
- Education: University of Guelph-Humber; University of Bradford
- Occupation: Politician

Kaleed Rasheed (born June 15, 1982) is a Canadian politician who represented Mississauga East—Cooksville in the Legislative Assembly of Ontario from 2018 to 2025. He previously served as the minister of public and business service delivery from 2022 to 2023 and associate minister of digital government from 2019 to 2022. Rasheed was initially elected as a member of the Progressive Conservative Party (PC), but resigned from the PC caucus and provincial cabinet to sit as an independent MPP on September 20, 2023 over his relationship with a developer involved in the Greenbelt scandal. Rasheed announced on October 11, 2024 that he would not seek re-election after the 43rd Parliament of Ontario's term ends.

== Early life, education and career ==
Rasheed was born in Pakistan in 1982 and moved to Canada as a young adult.

Rasheed studied at the University of Guelph-Humber Business Program and graduated with a Bachelor of Business Administration (BBA) degree in 2009. Shortly after, he moved to the U.K. to earn his Master of Business Administration (MBA) at the University of Bradford before joining BlackBerry as an Enterprise Account Executive.

While at University of Guelph-Humber, Rasheed lead the creation of a cricket team that competed against other post-secondary schools.

=== Personal life ===
His grandfather, Major Mohammad Aslam Khan, was a Second World War veteran serving in the British-Indian army and served as an army officer in Pakistan's Baloch Regiment, an infantry regiment of the Pakistan army; and originally moved to Canada in 1967 along with his family. Rasheed lives in Mississauga with his wife Sofiya, and five children Noor, Mariam, Yousuf, Aisha, and Hamzah.

== Political career ==
Rasheed was acclaimed the PC nomination for the riding of Mississauga East—Cooksville on May 24, 2017. He won the race for his riding in the 2018 election against incumbent, Dipika Damerla, making him the first PC member to win the riding provincially since 1999.

In 2019, he was named Deputy Government Whip following a cabinet shuffle.

=== Associate Minister of Digital Government ===
June 18, 2021, in a major cabinet shuffle, Rasheed was promoted to be Ontario's first ever associate minister of digital government, housed in the Ministry of Finance.

His portfolio priorities are outlined in the government's Digital and Data Strategy, published in April 2021 by finance minister Peter Bethlenfalvy. Projects outlined in the strategy include the launch of the digital and data fellowship program, trusted artificial intelligence framework, data authority, and digital identification (ID).

Rasheed announced the launch of the digital and data fellowship program in December 2021, where private sector experts are matched with public service teams in order to work on technology related projects including digital access to courts, modernization of public services, and digital ID. The government developed the Verify Ontario, the province's COVID-19 proof-of-vaccination app.

=== Minister of Public and Business Service Delivery ===
Rasheed was re-elected in the 2022 Ontario election and was named the minister of public and business service delivery in June 2022.

=== Resignation from provincial cabinet and PC caucus ===
Rasheed provided the integrity commissioner with contradicting records regarding a trip he and a property developer took to Las Vegas, Nevada, in 2020. Rasheed resigned from caucus and cabinet on September 20, 2023 amid the Ontario minister's zoning orders controversy. He remained the member of provincial parliament for Mississauga East—Cooksville, sitting as an independent.

On October 11, 2024, Rasheed announced he would not run for re-election at the end of his current term.

== Electoral record ==
2022 Ontario general election: Mississauga East—Cooksville
| Party | Candidate | Votes | % | ±% |
|---|---|---|---|---|
| Progressive Conservative | Kaleed Rasheed | 13,840 | 40.91 | −0.24 |
| Liberal | Dipika Damerla | 12,634 | 37.35 | +7.11 |
| New Democratic | Khawar Hussain | 3,664 | 10.83 | −11.91 |
| New Blue | Mark Morrissey | 1,599 | 4.73 | |
| Green | James Hea | 1,345 | 3.98 | +0.52 |
| Ontario Party | Gregory Tomchyshyn | 625 | 1.85 | |
| Moderate | Wiktor Jachtholtz | 121 | 0.36 | −0.05 |
| Total valid votes | | 33,828 | 100.0 | |
| Total rejected, unmarked, and declined ballots | | 222 | | |
| Turnout | | 34,050 | 39.58 | |
| Eligible voters | | 85,958 | | |
| Progressive Conservative hold | | Swing | | −3.68 |
Source(s): "Summary of Valid Votes Cast for Each Candidate" (PDF). Elections Ontario. 2022. Archived from the original on 2023-05-18.; "Statistical Summary by Electoral District" (PDF). Elections Ontario. 2022. Archived from the original on 2023-05-21.

2018 Ontario general election: Mississauga East—Cooksville
| Party | Candidate | Votes | % | ±% |
|---|---|---|---|---|
| Progressive Conservative | Kaleed Rasheed | 17,862 | 41.15 | +13.22 |
| Liberal | Dipika Damerla | 13,123 | 30.23 | −19.96 |
| New Democratic | Tom Takacs | 9,871 | 22.74 | +7.83 |
| Green | Basia Krzyzanowski | 1,498 | 3.45 | −0.20 |
| Libertarian | Mark Donaldson | 463 | 1.07 | N/A |
| None of the Above | Leonard Little | 413 | 0.95 | N/A |
| Moderate | Mykola Ponomarenko | 175 | 0.40 | N/A |
| Total valid votes | | 43,405 | 98.97 | |
| Total rejected, unmarked and declined ballots | | 447 | 1.03 | |
| Turnout | | 43,852 | 52.2 | |
| Eligible voters | | 83,122 | | |
| Progressive Conservative notional gain from Liberal | | Swing | | +16.59 |
Source: Elections Ontario
