= Official Opposition Shadow Cabinet of the 42nd Legislative Assembly of Ontario =

The Official Opposition Shadow Cabinet of the 42nd Legislative Assembly of Ontario, Canada was the shadow cabinet of the main Opposition party, responsible for holding Ministers to account and for developing and disseminating the party's policy positions. In the 42nd Legislative Assembly of Ontario, which began in 2018 and ended in 2022, the Official Opposition was formed by the Ontario New Democratic Party.

A shuffle of the Shadow Cabinet was announced by the Ontario NDP in January to February 2021.

Critic	Portfolio	Duration
Andrea Horwath	Leader of the Opposition	2018–2022
Andrea Horwath	Intergovernmental Affairs	2018–2022
Jill Andrew	Culture and Heritage (formerly Culture)	2018–2022
Jill Andrew	Women's Issues	2019–2022
Teresa Armstrong	Deputy Whip	2018
Teresa Armstrong	Deputy House Leader	2018–2019
Teresa Armstrong	Home Care and Long Term Care	2018–2021
Teresa Armstrong	Chief Whip	2019–2021
Teresa Armstrong	Children and Youth Services	2021–2022
Ian Arthur	Environment (formerly Environment and Sustainability)	2018–2021
Ian Arthur	Small Business Recovery, Reopening Main Street	2021–2022
Doly Begum	Early Learning and Childcare	2018–2021
Doly Begum	Deputy Whip	2019–2021
Doly Begum	Citizenship, Foreign Credentials and Immigration Services	2021–2022
Jessica Bell	Transit	2018–2021
Jessica Bell	Tenant Rights, Housing, and Urban Planning	2021–2022
Rima Berns-McGown	Poverty and Homelessness	2018–2022
Gilles Bisson	House Leader	2018–2021
Gilles Bisson	Community Safety and Correctional Services	2021–2022
Guy Bourgouin	Francophone Affairs	2018–2022
Guy Bourgouin	Training, Trades and Apprenticeships	2018–2021
Jeff Burch	Municipal Affairs	2018–2022
Catherine Fife	Economic Growth and Job Creation (formerly Jobs, Employment, Research and Innovation)	2018–2021
Catherine Fife	Research and Innovation (formerly Jobs, Employment, Research and Innovation)	2018–2021
Catherine Fife	International Trade	2019–2021
Catherine Fife	Finance and Treasury Board	2021–2022
Catherine Fife	Caucus Chair	2021–2022
Jennifer French	Transportation and Highways	2018–2022
Jennifer French	Infrastructure	2018–2022
Wayne Gates	Labour-Workplace Health and Safety (formerly Health and Safety, WSIB)	2018–2022
Wayne Gates	Auto Strategy (formerly Auto and Manufacturing)	2019–2022
Wayne Gates	Training, Trades and Apprenticeships	2021–2022
France Gelinas	Health (formerly Health Care)	2018–2022
France Gelinas	Deputy House Leader	2018
France Gelinas	Chief Whip	2018–2019
Chris Glover	Colleges and Universities	2018–2021
Chris Glover	Technology Development and Innovation	2021–2022
Lisa Gretzky	Community and Social Services	2018–2022
Joel Harden	Accessibility and Persons with Disabilities	2018–2022
Joel Harden	Seniors (formerly Pensions and Seniors Affairs)	2018–2021
Faisal Hassan	Youth Opportunities (formerly Youth Engagement)	2018–2022
Percy Hatfield	OLG and Horse Racing	2018–2022
Bhutila Karpoche	Mental Health and Addictions	2018–2021
Bhutila Karpoche	Deputy Whip	2018–2019
Bhutila Karpoche	Early Learning and Childcare	2021–2022
Terence Kernaghan	LGBTQ Issues	2018–2022
Terence Kernaghan	Government Services and Consumer Protection	2021–2022
Laura Mae Lindo	Anti-Racism	2018–2022
Laura Mae Lindo	Citizenship and Immigration Services	2018–2021
Laura Mae Lindo	Colleges and Universities	2021–2022
Sol Mamakwa	Indigenous and Treaty Relations (formerly Indigenous Relations and Reconciliation)	2018–2022
Michael Mantha	Northern Development (formerly Northern Development and Mines)	2018–2022
Michael Mantha	Caucus Chair	2018–2021
Michael Mantha	Tourism	2021–2022
Michael Mantha	Deputy Whip	2021–2022
Paul Miller	Sports (formerly Tourism and Sport)	2018–2022
Paul Miller	Pensions	2019–2022
Judith Monteith-Farrell	Natural Resources, Forestry and Mines (formerly Natural Resources, Forestry, Conservation and Parks)	2018–2022
Suze Morrison	Housing	2018–2019
Suze Morrison	Women's Issues	2018–2019
Suze Morrison	Tenant Rights	2019–2021
Suze Morrison	Urban Indigenous Issues	2019–2022
Suze Morrison	Missing and Murdered Indigenous Women and Girls Response	2019–2022
Taras Natyshak	International Trade	2018–2019
Taras Natyshak	Ethics and Accountability	2019–2022
Taras Natyshak	Job Creation and Economic Recovery	2021–2022
Tom Rakocevic	Government Services and Consumer Protection	2018–2021
Tom Rakocevic	Auto Insurance	2019–2021
Tom Rakocevic	Transit	2021–2022
Peggy Sattler	Economic Development	2018–2019
Peggy Sattler	Deputy House Leader	2019–2021
Peggy Sattler	Pay Equity	2019–2021
Peggy Sattler	Employment Standards	2019–2021
Peggy Sattler	Democratic Reform	2019–2022
Peggy Sattler	House Leader	2021–2022
Peggy Sattler	Labour	2021–2022
Sandy Shaw	Finance and Treasury Board	2018–2021
Sandy Shaw	Environment, Conservation and Parks	2021–2022
Gurratan Singh	Auto Insurance	2018–2019
Gurratan Singh	Attorney General	2019–2022
Gurratan Singh	Deputy House Leader	2021–2022
Sara Singh	Deputy Leader	2018–2022
Sara Singh	Attorney General	2018–2019
Sara Singh	Housing	2019–2021
Sara Singh	Seniors, Home Care, and Long Term Care	2021–2022
Jennie Stevens	Veterans, Legions and Military Affairs	2018–2022
Marit Stiles	Education	2018–2022
Peter Tabuns	Climate Crisis (formerly Energy and Climate Change)	2018–2022
Peter Tabuns	Energy (formerly Energy and Climate Change)	2018–2022
Monique Taylor	Children and Youth Services	2018–2021
Monique Taylor	Deputy Whip	2019–2022
Monique Taylor	Mental Health and Addictions	2021–2022
John Vanthof	Deputy Leader	2018–2022
John Vanthof	Chief Whip	2018, 2021–2022
John Vanthof	Agriculture and Food, Rural Development	2018–2022
Jamie West	Labour Relations Act (formerly Labour)	2018–2021
Jamie West	Northern Infrastructure, Transportation and Roads	2021–2022
Kevin Yarde	Community Safety and Correctional Services	2018–2019, 2019–2021
Kevin Yarde	Deputy Whip	2018–2019
Kevin Yarde	Solicitor General	2019
Kevin Yarde	Auto Insurance	2021–2022

== See also ==
- Executive Council of Ontario
- Official Opposition Shadow Cabinet of the 43rd Legislative Assembly of Ontario
