= Executive Council of Ontario =

Cabinet of the Canadian province of Ontario

Executive Council of Ontario Conseil des ministres de l'Ontario
- Cabinet of the Province of Ontario, Canada

- Coat of arms of Ontario
- Date formed: July 20, 1867 (159 years ago)

People and organizations
- Monarch: Charles III
- Lieutenant Governor: Edith Dumont
- Premier: Doug Ford
- Chair of Cabinet: Vic Fedeli
- Current ministry: Ford ministry
- Member party: Progressive Conservative

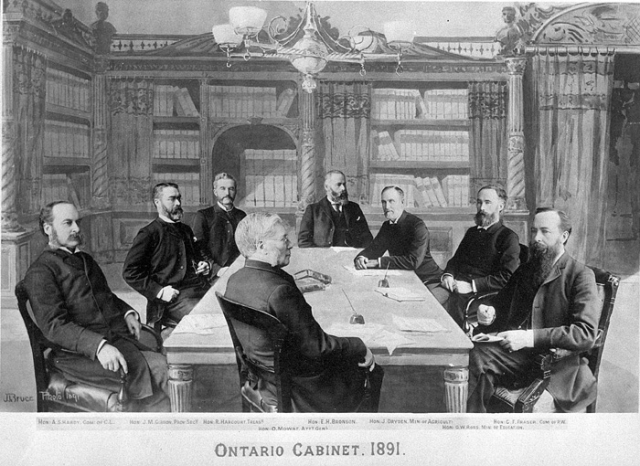
The Ontario Cabinet of 1891. Clockwise, starting at centre foreground: O. Mowat, A.S. Hardy, J.M. Gibson, R. Harcourt, E.H. Bronson, J. Dryden, G.W. Ross, C.F. Fraser.

The Executive Council of Ontario (French: Conseil des ministres de l'Ontario), often referred to as the Cabinet of Ontario (French: Cabinet de l'Ontario), is the cabinet and the executive committee of the provincial government of the Canadian province of Ontario. It comprises ministers of the Crown in right of Ontario, who are selected by the premier of Ontario (the first minister) and formally appointed by the lieutenant governor. The activities of the Government of Ontario are directed by the Executive Council.

The council serves a similar function as the Privy Council for Canada. The "Crown in right of Ontario" is the legal entity that owns government property, employs public servants, and acts in legal proceedings like criminal prosecutions. Accordingly, the cabinet exercises executive and sovereign powers within Ontario's jurisdiction in the name of the monarch "in right of Ontario". Similar to decisions of the federal cabinet, executive decisions by the Ontario cabinet are known as Order-in-Council, formally issued by in the name of the lieutenant governor, the monarch's representative in the province, on the advice of the ministers. Though the lieutenant governor does not attend cabinet meetings, cabinet directives are said to be ordered by the Lieutenant Governor-in-Council.

== Members of the Executive Council ==
The cabinet generally consists of current members of the Legislative Assembly of Ontario, with the following exceptions:

- Ministers not returned following a general election (either not having seek reelection or not having been re-elected) cease to be members of the assembly on the date of resolution of the previous assembly, but continue as members of the council until the replacement council takes office. The most recent example of this was Michael Ford, who stood down at the 2025 election and therefore ceased to be the MPP for York South—Weston on January 28 but remained the Minister of Citizenship and Multiculturalism and a member of council for 50 days until his successor Graham McGregor was appointed on March 19.
- An individual who is not a current member of the assembly being named leader of the governing party would be invited to form the subsequent cabinet. The most recent example of this was Ernie Eves, who was elected Progressive Conservatives leader in 2002 on March 23, assumed the premiership on April 15, and served the first 16 days without a seat until returning to the legislature through a byelection on May 2 that year.
- Until the abolishment of ministerial by-elections in 1941, certain newly appointed ministers were required to resign and recontest their seats in the legislature.

As member of the executive council, ministers may use the honorific prefix "The Honourable" while holding office. That privilege was extended to former ministers in June 2025.

=== Former ministers ===
Unlike federal ministers who are appointed privy councillor for life (strictly speaking, for the lifetime of the appointing monarch, but in practice upon the monarch's demise are all reappointed by the successor monarch), provincial ministers are members of the Executive Council only while in office.

Prior to 2025, former ministers and premiers were not entitled to the honorific prefix "the Honourable" unless they were otherwise entitled for reasons including:

- Service as federal ministers and corresponding appointment to the Privy Council of Canada
- Appointments to the Privy Council for some other reasons (e.g. former premiers David Peterson and Bob Rae were appointed after their premierships, respectively in 1992 as part of Canada's 125th anniversary commemoration and in 1998 upon joining the Security Intelligence Review Committee)
- Service as justice of a superior court (e.g. former attorney general Roy McMurtry gained the entitlement upon his appointment to the Superior Court of Justice.)

As part of the omnibus bill for implementation of the 2025 budget, the legislature formally instituted the post-nominal “E.C.O.” and designated all living former members who have not been convicted of an indictable or hybrid criminal offence as "honorary members" of the Executive Council. The designation grants former ministers the right of continued use of the honorific prefix and the post-nominals for life without the rights, obligations or privileges of a current minister. Ontario is the fourth Canadian province to adopt this practice, following the examples by conservative governments in the provinces of Nova Scotia (as of 2009), Saskatchewan (2019), and Alberta (2022).

== Current Composition ==
Doug Ford and his Cabinet were sworn in by Lieutenant Governor Elizabeth Dowdeswell on June 29, 2018, following the 2018 general election. Ford conducted six major cabinet shuffles (with substantial numbers of ministers changing roles) since 2018 and 7 minor adjustments (triggered by resignations and impacted small numbers of ministers).

The current composition of the Ford ministry was largely set by a major cabinet shuffle carried out on September 10, 2026, when three new ministers taking the places of three ministers departed over the summer months and six incumbent ministers assuming new roles. The shuffle return the ministry's rank to its record 37 members, the largest cabinet in Ontario history.

Explanatory notes: Assumed office and Entered ministry: contain years correspond to the major cabinet shuffles that took place on the follow date, unless otherwise noted.

During 42nd Parliament
- June 29, 2018
- June 20, 2019
- June 18, 2021
During 43rd Parliament
- June 24, 2022
- September 4, 2023
- June 6, 2024
During 44th Parliament (current)
- March 19, 2025
- September 10, 2026

Ordering: Per Ministry of Intergovernmental Affairs' Ontario order of precedence, members of the council are to be ordered "in accordance with the precedence document issued by the Cabinet Office", but no such documents is currently made public. Previous version of the document follow ordering similar to that in the Table of Precedence of Canada, primarily by the date a member first joined council, followed by the date of their first election to the legislature. This table is ordered as such.)

Minister	Portfolio	Assumed office	Entered ministry	First elected
Doug Ford	Premier & President of the Council	2018	2018	2018
Doug Ford	Minister of Intergovernmental Affairs	2018	2018	2018
Sylvia Jones	Deputy Premier	2022	2018	2007
Sylvia Jones	Minister of Health	2022	2018	2007
Vic Fedeli	Chair of Cabinet	2018	2018	2011
Vic Fedeli	Minister of Economic Development, Job Creation and Trade	2019	2018	2011
Lisa Thompson	Minister of Rural Affairs	2021	2018	2011
Raymond Cho	Minister for Seniors and Accessibility	2018	2018	2016 (Note: Won in a by-election.)
Peter Bethlenfalvy	Minister of Finance	2020 (Note: December 31, 2020, following the resignation of Rod Phillips.)	2018	2018
Greg Rickford	Minister of Indigenous Affairs and First Nations Economic Reconciliation	2018	2018	2018 (Note: Previously served in the House of Commons from 2008 to 2015.)
Greg Rickford	Minister Responsible for Ring of Fire Economic and Community Partnerships	2025	2018	2018
Doug Downey	Attorney General	2019	2019	2018
Paul Calandra	Minister of Education	2025	2019	2018
Jill Dunlop	Minister of Emergency Preparedness and Response	2025	2019	2018
Stephen Lecce	Minister of Energy and Mines	2025	2019	2018
Prabmeet Sarkaria	Minister of Transportation	2023	2019	2018
Kinga Surma	President of the Treasury Board	2026	2019	2018
David Piccini	Minister of Infrastructure	2026	2021	2018
Michael Parsa	Minister of Children, Community and Social Services	2023 (Note: March 24, 2023, following the resignation of Merrilee Fullerton.)	2022	2018
Michael Kerzner	Solicitor General of Ontario	2022	2022	2022
George Pirie	Minister of Northern Economic Development and Growth	2025	2022	2022
Rob Flack	Minister of Municipal Affairs and Housing	2025	2023	2022
Todd McCarthy	Minister of the Environment, Conservation and Parks	2025	2023	2022
Andrea Khanjin	Minister of Red Tape Reduction	2025	2023 (Note: September 22, 2023, following the resignation of Monte McNaughton.)	2018
Sam Oosterhoff	Minister of Agriculture, Food and Agribusiness	2026	2024	2016
Stephen Crawford	Minister of Public and Business Service Delivery and Procurement	2025	2024	2018
Mike Harris Jr.	Minister of Natural Resources	2025	2024	2018
Natalia Kusendova-Bashta	Minister of Long-Term Care	2024	2024	2018
Natalia Kusendova-Bashta	Minister of Francophone Affairs	2026	2024	2018
Trevor Jones	Minister of Labour, Immigration, Training and Skills Development	2026	2024	2022
Nolan Quinn	Minister of Colleges, Universities, Research Excellence and Security	2025	2024	2022
Graham McGregor	Minister of Citizenship and Multiculturalism	2025	2024 (Note: August 16, 2024, following the resignation of Todd Smith.)	2022
Michael Tibollo	Associate Attorney General	2025	2018	2018
Nina Tangri	Associate Minister of Small Business	2023	2021	2018
Charmaine Williams	Associate Minister of Women’s Social and Economic Opportunity	2022	2022	2022
Graydon Smith	Associate Minister of Municipal Affairs and Housing	2025	2022	2022
Vijay Thanigasalam	Associate Minister of Artificial Intelligence Adoption	2026	2023	2018
Kevin Holland	Associate Minister of Forestry and Forest Products	2025	2024	2022
Zee Hamid	Minister of Tourism, Culture and Gaming	2026	2025	2024
Brian Saunderson	Minister of Sport	2026	2026	2022
Matthew Rae	Associate Minister of Energy-Intensive Industries	2026	2026	2022
Michelle Cooper	Associate Minister of Mental Health and Addictions	2026	2026	2025

== Past Ontario ministries ==
=== Before Confederation ===
A distinct government administration for present day Ontario was first formed in 1791 when the western portion of the colonial Province of Quebec was made its own colony as Upper Canada within British North America. The first five members of the Executive Council of Upper Canada were appointed in July 1792. The colonial executive council was however not accountable to the legislature but solely to the Lieutenant Governor.

The Executive Council of Upper Canada was dissolved on 10 February 1841 when Upper Canada and Lower Canada were united into the Province of Canada. The united province, though only existed for a quarter of a century, firmly established responsible government as a constitutional principle for the formation of government administration. The cabinet of the united province, the Executive Council of the Province of Canada, was led by two joint-premiers, one from each of Canada West (present day Ontario) and Canada East (present day Quebec). In 1848, Lieutenant Governor Lord Elgin, specifically appointed by the British cabinet to formally acknowledge responsible government in the united province, invited Robert Baldwin and Louis-Hippolyte LaFontaine, respectively the leaders of the reform partisans in Canada West and Canada East, to form their second administration (their first administration was in office 1842–43), but the first cabinet that was strictly dependent on the confidence of the legislature to remain in office.

=== Since Confederation ===
Ministry	Formation	Duration	Command of legislature	Reign
John Sandfield; Macdonald ministry	16 July 1867	4 years 5 mos, 6 days	Unclear - 1867; 34 / 74(46%) 1871 (Note: The 1871 election returned 43 Liberals and 39 Conservatives. When the house convened in December 1871, 3 Liberals and 5 Conservative seats were vacated.)	Victoria; 1937–1901
Edward; Blake ministry	20 December 1871	10 mos, 6 days	40 / 74(54%) 1871	Victoria; 1937–1901
Sir Oliver; Mowat ministry	25 October 1872	23 years 8 mos, 27 days	47 / 82(57%) 1872; 51 / 88(58%) 1875; 57 / 88(65%) 1879; 50 / 88(57%) 1883; 57 / 90(63%) 1886; 55 / 91(60%) 1890; 59 / 94(63%) 1894	Victoria; 1937–1901
Arthur; Hardy ministry	21 July 1896	3 years 3 mos, 2 days	62 / 93(67%) 1896; 51 / 94(54%) 1898	Victoria; 1937–1901
Sir George; Ross ministry	21 October 1899	5 years 3 mos, 20 days	50 / 91(55%) 1899	Victoria; 1937–1901
Sir George; Ross ministry	21 October 1899	5 years 3 mos, 20 days	50 / 98(51%) 1902	Edward VII; 1901–10
Sir James; Whitney ministry	8 February 1905	9 years 7 mos, 24 days	70 / 98(71%) 1905; 86 / 106(81%) 1908	Edward VII; 1901–10
Sir James; Whitney ministry	8 February 1905	9 years 7 mos, 24 days	82 / 106(77%) 1911; 84 / 111(76%) 1914	George V 1910–36
Sir William; Hearst ministry	2 October 1914	5 years 1 mos, 12 days	84 / 111(76%) 1914	George V 1910–36
Ernest; Drury ministry	14 November 1919	3 years 8 mos, 2 days	1919	George V 1910–36
Howard; Ferguson ministry	16 July 1923	7 years 5 mos, 2 days	75 / 111(68%) 1923; 74 / 112(66%) 1926; 92 / 112(82%) 1929	George V 1910–36
George; Henry ministry	15 December 1930	3 years 6 mos, 26 days	91 / 112(81%) 1930	George V 1910–36
Mitchell; Hepburn ministry	10 July 1934	8 years 3 mos, 13 days	70 / 90(78%) 1934	George V 1910–36
Mitchell; Hepburn ministry	10 July 1934	8 years 3 mos, 13 days	70 / 90(78%) 1934	Edward VIII; 1936
Mitchell; Hepburn ministry	10 July 1934	8 years 3 mos, 13 days	66 / 90(73%) 1937	George VI; 1936–52
Gordon Daniel; Conant ministry	21 October 1942	6 mos, 27 days	62 / 84(74%) 1942	George VI; 1936–52
Harry; Nixon ministry	18 May 1943	3 mos, 1 days	61 / 82(74%) 1943	George VI; 1936–52
George; Drew ministry	17 August 1943	5 years 2 mos, 2 days	38 / 90(42%) 1943; 66 / 90(73%) 1945; 53 / 90(59%) 1948	George VI; 1936–52
Thomas; Kennedy ministry	19 October 1948	6 mos, 15 days	53 / 90(59%) 1948	George VI; 1936–52
Leslie; Frost ministry	4 May 1949	12 years 6 mos, 6 days	53 / 90(59%) 1949; 79 / 90(88%) 1951	George VI; 1936–52
Leslie; Frost ministry	4 May 1949	12 years 6 mos, 6 days	83 / 98(85%) 1955; 71 / 98(72%) 1959	Elizabeth II; 1952–2022
John; Robarts ministry	8 November 1961	9 years 3 mos, 23 days	70 / 98(71%) 1961; 77 / 108(71%) 1963; 69 / 117(59%) 1967	Elizabeth II; 1952–2022
Bill; Davis ministry	1 March 1971	13 years 11 mos, 10 days	68 / 117(58%) Mar 1971; 78 / 117(67%) Oct 1971; 51 / 125(41%) 1975; 58 / 125(46%) 1977; 70 / 125(56%) 1981	Elizabeth II; 1952–2022
Frank; Miller ministry	8 February 1985	4 mos, 17 days	72 / 125(58%) Feb 1985; 52 / 125(42%) May 1985	Elizabeth II; 1952–2022
David; Peterson ministry	26 June 1985	5 years 3 mos, 7 days	1985; 95 / 130(73%) 1987	Elizabeth II; 1952–2022
Bob; Rae ministry	1 October 1990	4 years 8 mos, 25 days	74 / 130(57%) 1990	Elizabeth II; 1952–2022
Mike; Harris ministry	26 June 1995	6 years 9 mos, 20 days	82 / 130(63%) 1995; 59 / 103(57%) 1999	Elizabeth II; 1952–2022
Ernie; Eves ministry	15 April 2002	1 years 6 mos, 9 days	57 / 103(55%) 2002	Elizabeth II; 1952–2022
Dalton; McGuinty ministry	23 October 2003	9 years 3 mos, 22 days	72 / 103(70%) 2003; 71 / 107(66%) 2007; 53 / 107(50%) 2011	Elizabeth II; 1952–2022
Kathleen; Wynne ministry	11 February 2013	5 years 4 mos, 17 days	53 / 107(50%) 2013; 58 / 107(54%) 2014	Elizabeth II; 1952–2022
Doug; Ford ministry	29 June 2018	8 years, 140 days	76 / 124(61%) 2018	Elizabeth II; 1952–2022
Doug; Ford ministry	29 June 2018	8 years, 140 days	83 / 124(67%) 2022; 80 / 124(65%) 2025	Charles III since 2022

== Former portfolios ==
Portfolio ministries were titled "department" prior to 1972. Certain ministers held titles such as secretary and commissioners of their portfolio in the past.

As much as possible, the following list groups former portfolios as predecessor to current portfolios with similar but not perfectly identical functions/mandate.

Deputy Premier of Ontario (since 1977)

- Provincial Secretary and Registrar of Ontario (1867-1961)

Children, Community and Social Services (since 2018)

- Department of Public Welfare (1930–67)
- Ministry of Social and Family Services (1967–72)
- Ministry of Community and Social Services (1972-2002)
- Ministry of Community, Family and Children's Services (2002–2003)
- Ministry of Children's Services (2003–2004)
- Ministry of Children and Youth Services (2004–18)
- Ministry of Community and Social Services (2003–18)

Citizenship and Multiculturalism (since 2021)

- Ministry of Citizenship (1961–83, 1987–95; 2001–03)
- Ministry of Citizenship and Culture (1983–87)
- Ministry of Citizenship, Culture and Recreation (1995–2001)
- Ministry of Citizenship and Immigration (2003–14, 2016–18)
- Ministry of Citizenship, Immigration and International Trade (2014–16)

Economic Development, Job Creation and Trade (since 2018)

(Primary functions relating to industrial policy)

- Department of Planning and Development (1944–61)
- Department of Commerce and Development (1961)
- Department of Economics and Development (1961–68)
- Department of Trade and Development (1968–72)
- Ministry of Industry and Tourism (1972–82)
- Ministry of Industry and Trade Development (1982–85)
- Ministry of Industry, Trade and Technology (1985–1993)
- Ministry of Economic Development and Trade (1993–95, 1999-2002, 2003–11)
- Ministry of Economic Development, Trade and Tourism (1995–99; 2008–11)
- Ministry of Enterprise, Opportunity and Innovation (2002–2003)
- Ministry of Economic Development and Innovation (2011–13)
- Ministry of Economic Development, Trade and Employment (2013–14)
- Ministry of Economic Development, Employment and Infrastructure (2014–16)
- Ministry of Economic Development and Growth (2016–18)

(for trade promotion)

- Ministry of International Trade and Investment (2008–09)
- Ministry of International Trade (2016–18)

(for innovation and research policy)

- Ministry of Research and Innovation (2011–16)
- Ministry of Research, Innovation and Science (2016–18)

Education (since 1999) or Colleges, Universities, Research Excellence and Security (since 2025)

- Department of Public Instruction (1850–76)
- Department of Education (1876-1993)
- Department of University Affairs (1964–71)
- Ministry of Colleges and Universities (1971–93, 2018–25)
- Ministry of Education and Training (1993–99)
- Ministry of Training, Colleges and Universities (1999-2016, 2018–19)
- Ministry of Advanced Education and Skills Development (2016–18)

Energy & Mines

- Ministry of Energy and Infrastructure (2007–2010)
- Ministry of Energy, Science and Technology (1997–2002)

Environment, Conservation, and Parks

- Ministry of Environment and Energy (1993–1997; 2002)

Finance

- Ministry of Treasury and Economics (1978–1993)
- Ministry of Financial Institutions (1986–1993)
- Ministry of Revenue (1968–2012)

Indigenous Affairs and First Nations Economic Reconciliation (since 2024)

- Native Affairs Directorate (1987–91), Secretariat (1991-2006)
- Aboriginal Affairs Secretariat (2006–07)
- Ministry of Aboriginal Affairs (2007–16)
- Ministry of Indigenous Relations and Reconciliation (2016-2018)
- Ministry of Indigenous Affairs (2018–24)

Infrastructure (since 2010) or Transportation (since 1987)

- Board of Works (before confederation in Upper Canada)
- Department of Public Works (1867-1972)
  - held by the Commissioner of Agriculture and Public Works until 1874
- Commissioner of Highways (1900–16, within Department of Public Works)
- Department of Public Highways (1916–31)
- Department of Highways (1931–71)
- Department of Transport (1957–71)
- Ministry of Transportation and Communications (1971–1987)
- Ministry of Public Infrastructure Renewal (2003−2008)
- (held jointly with Energy 2008-10, with Economic Development 2014-16)

Municipal Affairs and Housing

- Ministry of Housing (1973–1981; 1985–1995)
- Ministry of Municipal Affairs (1985–1995; 2003–2004)

Labour, Immigration, Training, and Skills Development

- Bureau of Labour (1900–19, within Department of Public Works)
- Ministry of Labour (1919-2019)
- Ministry of Skills Development (1985–1993)
- Ministry of Labour, Training and Skills Development (2019–22)

Public and Business Service Delivery and Procurement (since 2022, Procurement added 2024)

- Ministry of Financial and Commercial Affairs (1966–72)
- Management Board Secretariat (1971-2005)
- Ministry of Government Services (1972–93, 2005–07, 2008–14)
- Ministry of Consumer and Commercial Relations (1972–2001)
- Ministry of Consumer and Business Services (2003–2005)
- Ministry of Government and Consumer Services (2007–08, 2014–22)
- Ministry of Small Business and Consumer Services (2008–09)
- Ministry of Consumer Services (2009–14)

Solicitor General (existed as such 1972-2002 except for 4 periods held jointly with Correctional Services, resumed this name in 2019)

- Department of the Provincial Secretary (1867-1946)
- Department of Reform Institutions (1946–68)
- Ministry of Correctional Services (1968–2002, except for 4 periods held jointly with Solicitor General)
- Ministry of the Solicitor General and Correctional Services (1985–86, 1987, 1990–92, 1993-99)
- Ministry of Public Safety and Security (2002–2003)
- Ministry of Community Safety and Correctional Services (2003–2019)

Tourism, Culture and Gaming and Sport

- Ministry of Culture and Communications (1987–1993)
- Ministry of Culture, Tourism and Recreation (1993–1995)
- Ministry of Tourism (1999–2001)
- Ministry of Tourism, Culture and Recreation (2001–2002)

== Ontario Shadow Cabinet ==
- Official Opposition Shadow Cabinet of the 43rd Legislative Assembly of Ontario

== See also ==
- Order of precedence in Ontario
