= Ministries of Tourism, Culture and Gaming and Sport =

Canadian provincial ministries

Ministry of Tourism, Culture and Gaming
- French: Ministère du Tourisme, de la Culture et des Jeux
- Government of Ontario wordmark

Ministry overview
- Formed: 1946
- Preceding agencies: Ministry of Culture; Ministry of Tourism; Ministry of Tourism, Culture and Sport
- Jurisdiction: Province of Ontario, Canada
- Headquarters: Hearst Block, 900 Bay Street, Toronto, ON
- Ministers responsible: Zee Hamid, Minister of Tourism, Culture and Gaming; Brian Saunderson, Minister of Sport
- Key document: Ministry of Tourism and Recreation Act, RSO 1990, c.M.35

The Ministry of Tourism, Culture and Gaming and the Ministry of Sport are the related government ministries in the Government of Ontario responsible for policies and programs in the economic sectors of tourism, art and culture, and sport and recreation.

Since 1982, ministerial authorities and responsibilities for these sectors formally rest with two portfolio ministers – the Minister of Tourism and Recreation and the Minister of Citizenship and Culture. From 2010 to 2024, the two portfolios were held jointly by a single minister, most recently known as the Minister of Tourism, Culture and Sport (for 11 of the 14 years prior to 2024).

The ministry took its current form in June 2024 when the Ministry of Sport was spun off from the ministry with then incumbent minister Neil Lumsden being appointed to the new ministry with much reduced scope while Stan Cho was appointed to the principal Tourism ministry. Both ministerial offices have been vacant since early August, 2026.

The Ministry works in partnership with its agencies, attractions, boards and commissions and the private sector to maximize the economic, cultural and social contributions of its agencies and attractions, while promoting the tourism industry and preserving Ontario's culture and heritage.

== Organizational history ==
A Tourist and Publicity Bureau was set up in 1924 to promote Ontario's attractions, especially those associated with nature and the outdoors. The bureau was initially a part of the Highways Department. In 1935, the bureau was renamed the Travel and Publicity Bureau, and was moved to Department of the Prime Minister. In 1944, the bureau moved to the Treasury Department.

=== Formal creation and reorganization ===
In 1946, the Progressive Conservative Drew ministry upgraded the bureau with the formal creation of the Department of Travel and Publicity by legislation. It was the first department with a mandate to develop economic industry sectors outside of the agriculture and natural resources sectors. (Note: While the Department of Planning and Development was established in 1944, its initial mandate was focused in postwar rehabilitation and resettlement of veterans into the society and workforce.) At establishment, the department consisted of only approximately fifteen employees in four branches: publicity, the information, winter promotion, and development branches. In 1958, the department began taking on responsibilities for the cultural area, with the establishment of the historical branch and the transfer of the theatres branch from the Treasury Department. In 1964, the department was renamed the Department of Tourism and Information by legislation.

In 1972 the Davis ministry undertook a reorganization of the government during which all departments were renamed ministries. During that exercise, the tourism department was merged into the economic development ministry, the new Ministry of Industry and Tourism. In December 1974, a standalone Ministry of Culture and Recreation was established, taking on responsibilities for cultural (transferred from the Ministry of Colleges and Universities), recreational and citizenship (transferred from the Ministry of Community and Social Services). It took on oversight functions for key institutions such as Ontario Arts Council, Ontario Heritage Foundation, Art Gallery of Ontario, and Ontario Science Centre.

In 1982, responsibilities for policy areas of tourism, recreation, culture and citizenship were redistributed to two new ministries distinct from the economic development ministry – the Ministry of Tourism and Recreation and the Ministry of Citizenship and Culture. These new ministries were formally established by enabling legislations enacted. The move was the last restructuring of the ministries to be conducted via formal legislative amendments or enactments. The Ministry of Tourism and Recreation Act and Ministry of Citizenship and Culture Act enacted in 1982 and incorporated in the Consolidated Statutes of Ontario remain in effect and are the primary enabling legislations from which the ministry (or at various times, ministries) and its ministers derive their formal legal authority. Subsequent instances of renaming and reorganization of the ministry were executed via order-in-councils assigning formal authorities and responsibilities to ministers with the new, often transitory, titles.

=== Renaming and reorganization of the ministries since 1982 ===
In 1987, the Ministry of Citizenship and Culture was further divided into Ministry of Citizenship and the Ministry of Culture and Communications (taking on responsibilities for communications and broadcasting from the Ministry of Transportation and Communications).

In 1993 the responsibilities for tourism and culture were united under the newly amalgamated Ministry of Culture, Tourism and Recreation. (Communications functions were transferred to the Ministry of Economic Development and Trade.) However, those two responsibilities would be divided and re-united numerous time over the next two decades. When the Progressive Conservatives under Mike Harris came to power in 1995, it again separated the tourism functions and culture functions, to Ministry of Economic Development, Trade and Tourism and Ministry of Citizenship, Culture and Recreation. The Ministry of Tourism again became a standalone ministry in 1999, and was reunited with the cultural functions in 2001 as Ministry of Tourism, Culture and Recreation. The two functions were divided again in 2002, and were merged again in 2010. Sport was added to the ministry's name at the cabinet reshuffle following the 2011 provincial election.

The ministry was renamed to Ministry Heritage, Sport, Tourism and Culture Industries in 2019. Following the appointment of Neil Lumsden as Minister of Tourism, Culture and Sport in 2022, the Ministry was renamed back to Tourism, Culture and Sport. Following the appointment of Stan Cho as the Minister of tourism, culture and gaming, with responsibility for OLG on June 6, 2024, the Ministry was divided into the Ministry of Tourism, Culture and Gaming and Ministry of Sport.

== Agencies ==
As of September 2026, the ministry is accountable for the following agencies:

- Art Gallery of Ontario
- Destination Ontario (formerly the Ontario Tourism Marketing Partnership Corporation)
- iGaming Ontario
- McMichael Canadian Art Collection
- Metro Toronto Convention Centre
- Niagara Parks Commission
- Ontario Arts Council
- Ontario Creates (formerly the Ontario Media Development Corporation)
- Ontario Lottery and Gaming Corporation
- Ontario Science Centre
- Ontario Trillium Foundation
- Ottawa Convention Centre
- Royal Botanical Gardens
- Royal Ontario Museum
- Science North
- St. Lawrence Parks Commission

== List of ministers ==
| Name | Term of office | | Name | Term of office | | Ministry party | |
|---|---|---|---|---|---|---|---|
| Minister of Travel and Publicity | | | | | | Drew- Kennedy PC | |
| George Arthur Welsh | March 25, 1946 | Oct 19, 1948 | | | | Drew- Kennedy PC | |
| Louis-Pierre Cécile | Oct 19, 1948 | May 4, 1949 | | | | Drew- Kennedy PC | |
| Louis-Pierre Cécile | May 4, 1949 | August 17, 1955 | | | | Frost PC | |
| Bryan Lewis Cathcart | August 17, 1955 | Nov 8, 1961 | | | | Frost PC | |
| Bryan Lewis Cathcart | Nov 8, 1961 | August 14, 1963 | | | | Robarts PC | |
| James Auld | August 14, 1963 | March 25, 1964 | | | | Robarts PC | |
| Minister of Tourism and Information | | | | | | Robarts PC | |
| James Auld | March 25, 1964 | March 1, 1971 | | | | Robarts PC | |
| Fernand Guindon | March 1, 1971 | Feb 2, 1972 | | | | Davis PC | |
| John White | Feb 2, 1972 | April 7, 1972 | | | | Davis PC | (Note: White was concurrently Minister of Trade and Development) |
| Minister of Industry and Tourism | | | | | | Davis PC | |
| John White | April 7, 1972 | Jan 15, 1973 | | | | Davis PC | |
| Claude Bennett | Jan 15, 1973 | Jan 21, 1978 | Minister of Culture and Recreation | | | Davis PC | |
| Claude Bennett | Jan 15, 1973 | Jan 21, 1978 | Bob Welch | Jan 14, 1975 | August 16, 1978 | Davis PC | |
| John Rhodes | Jan 21, 1978 | Sep 25, 1978 | Bob Welch | Jan 14, 1975 | August 16, 1978 | Davis PC | (Note: Rhodes died in office, suffered a heart attack during a trade mission to the Middle East with Premier Davis.) |
| Larry Grossman | Oct 18, 1978 | Feb 13, 1982 | Reuben Baetz | August 18, 1978 | Feb 13, 1982 | Davis PC | |
| Minister of Tourism and Recreation | | | Minister of Citizenship and Culture | | | Davis PC | |
| Reuben Baetz | Feb 13, 1982 | Feb 8, 1985 | Bruce McCaffrey | Feb 13, 1982 | July 6, 1983 | Davis PC | |
| Reuben Baetz | Feb 13, 1982 | Feb 8, 1985 | Susan Fish | July 6, 1983 | Feb 8, 1985 | Davis PC | |
| Claude Bennett | Feb 8, 1985 | June 26, 1985 | Susan Fish | Feb 8, 1985 | May 17, 1985 | Miller PC | |
| Claude Bennett | Feb 8, 1985 | June 26, 1985 | Nick Leluk | May 17, 1985 | June 26, 1985 | Miller PC | |
| John Eakins | June 26, 1985 | Sep 29, 1987 | Lily Munro | June 26, 1985 | Sep 29, 1987 | Peterson Liberal | |
| Hugh O'Neil | Sep 29, 1987 | August 2, 1989 | Minister of Culture and Communications | | | Peterson Liberal | |
| Hugh O'Neil | Sep 29, 1987 | August 2, 1989 | Lily Munro | Sep 29, 1987 | August 2, 1989 | Peterson Liberal | |
| Ken Black | August 2, 1989 | Oct 1, 1990 | Christine Hart | August 2, 1989 | June 5, 1990 | Peterson Liberal | |
| Ken Black | August 2, 1989 | Oct 1, 1990 | Hugh O'Neil | June 5, 1990 | Oct 1, 1990 | Peterson Liberal | |
| Peter North | Oct 1, 1990 | Nov 13, 1992 | Rosario Marchese | Oct 1, 1990 | July 31, 1991 | Rae NDP | |
| Karen Haslam | July 31, 1991 | Feb 3, 1993 | Ed Philip | Nov 13, 1992 | Feb 3, 1993 | Rae NDP | (Note: Philip was concurrently Minister of Industry, Trade and Technology) |
| Minister of Culture, Tourism and Recreation | | | | | | Rae NDP | |
| Anne Swarbrick | | | | Feb 3, 1993 | June 26, 1995 | Rae NDP | |
| Minister Economic Development, Trade and Tourism | | | Minister of Citizenship, Culture and Recreation | | | Harris PC | |
| Bill Saunderson | June 26, 1995 | Oct 10, 1997 | Marilyn Mushinski | June 26, 1995 | Oct 10, 1997 | Harris PC | |
| Al Palladini | Oct 10, 1997 | June 17, 1999 | Isabel Bassett | Oct 10, 1997 | June 17, 1999 | Harris PC | |
| Minister of Tourism | | | Helen Johns | June 17, 1999 | Feb 7, 2001 | Harris PC | |
| Cam Jackson | June 17, 1999 | Feb 7, 2001 | Helen Johns | June 17, 1999 | Feb 7, 2001 | Harris PC | |
| Minister of Culture, Tourism and Recreation | | | | | | Harris PC | |
| Tim Hudak | | | | Feb 8, 2001 | April 14, 2002 | Harris PC | |
| Minister of Tourism and Recreation | | | Minister of Culture | | | Eves PC | |
| Cam Jackson | April 15, 2002 | Oct 2, 2002 | David Tsubouchi | April 15, 2002 | Oct 22, 2003 | Eves PC | (Note: Tsubouchi was concurrently Chair of the Management Board of Cabinet) |
| Frank Klees | Oct 3, 2002 | Feb 25, 2003 | David Tsubouchi | April 15, 2002 | Oct 22, 2003 | Eves PC | (Note: Tsubouchi was concurrently Chair of the Management Board of Cabinet) |
| Brian Coburn | Feb 25, 2003 | Oct 22, 2003 | David Tsubouchi | April 15, 2002 | Oct 22, 2003 | Eves PC | (Note: Tsubouchi was concurrently Chair of the Management Board of Cabinet) |
| Jim Bradley | Oct 23, 2003 | June 29, 2005 | Madeleine Meilleur | Oct 23, 2003 | April 5, 2006 | McGuinty Liberal | |
| Minister of Tourism | | | Madeleine Meilleur | Oct 23, 2003 | April 5, 2006 | McGuinty Liberal | |
| Jim Bradley | June 29, 2005 | Oct 30, 2007 | Madeleine Meilleur | Oct 23, 2003 | April 5, 2006 | McGuinty Liberal | |
| Jim Bradley | June 29, 2005 | Oct 30, 2007 | Caroline Di Cocco | April 5, 2006 | Oct 30, 2007 | McGuinty Liberal | |
| Peter Fonseca | Oct 30, 2007 | Sep 18, 2008 | Aileen Carroll | Oct 30, 2007 | Jan 18, 2010 | McGuinty Liberal | |
| Monique Smith | Sep 18, 2008 | Jan 18, 2010 | Aileen Carroll | Oct 30, 2007 | Jan 18, 2010 | McGuinty Liberal | |
| Minister of Tourism and Culture | | | | | | McGuinty Liberal | |
| Michael Chan | | | | Jan 18, 2010 | Dec 7, 2011 | McGuinty Liberal | |
| Minister of Tourism, Culture and Sport | | | | | | McGuinty Liberal | |
| Michael Chan | | | | Dec 7, 2011 | Feb 11, 2013 | McGuinty Liberal | |
| Michael Chan | | | | Feb 11, 2013 | June 24, 2014 | Wynne Liberal | |
| Michael Coteau | | | | June 24, 2014 | June 13, 2016 | Wynne Liberal | |
| Eleanor McMahon | | | | June 13, 2016 | Jan 17, 2018 | Wynne Liberal | |
| Daiene Vernile | | | | Jan 17, 2018 | June 29, 2018 | Wynne Liberal | |
| Sylvia Jones | | | | June 29, 2018 | Nov 5, 2018 | Ford PC | |
| Michael Tibollo | | | | Nov 5, 2018 | June 20, 2019 | Ford PC | |
| Lisa MacLeod | | | | June 20, 2019 | Oct 21, 2019 | Ford PC | |
| Minister of Heritage, Sport, Tourism and Culture Industries | | | | | | Ford PC | |
| Lisa MacLeod | | | | Oct 21, 2019 | June 24, 2022 | Ford PC | |
| Minister of Tourism, Culture and Sport | | | | | | Ford PC | |
| Neil Lumsden | | | | June 24, 2022 | June 6, 2024 | Ford PC | |
| Minister of Tourism, Culture and Gaming | | | Minister of Sport | | | Ford PC | |
| Stan Cho | June 6, 2024 | July 17, 2026 | Neil Lumsden | June 6, 2024 | August 4, 2026 | Ford PC | |
| Zee Hamid | September 10, 2026 | present | Brian Saunderson | September 10, 2026 | present | Ford PC | |

== See also ==
- Ontario Heritage Act
- For current organizational details, see INFO-GO (Ontario government office directory)
