= Prabmeet Sarkaria =

Canadian politician

The Honourable Prabmeet Sarkaria ECO KC MPP
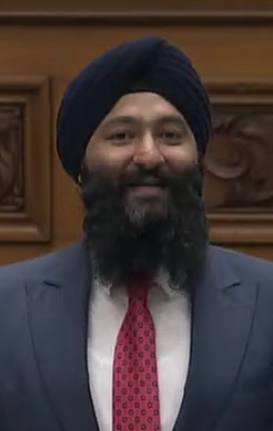
- Sarkaria in 2019

Ontario Minister of Transportation
- Incumbent
- Assumed office September 4, 2023
- Premier: Doug Ford
- Preceded by: Caroline Mulroney

President of the Treasury Board of Ontario
- In office June 18, 2021 – September 4, 2023
- Premier: Doug Ford
- Preceded by: Peter Bethlenfalvy
- Succeeded by: Caroline Mulroney

Associate Minister of Small Business and Red Tape Reduction
- In office June 20, 2019 – June 18, 2021
- Premier: Doug Ford
- Preceded by: Position established
- Succeeded by: Nina Tangri

Parliamentary Assistant to the Solicitor General
- In office April 4, 2019 – June 20, 2019
- Premier: Doug Ford
- Succeeded by: Christine Hogarth and Belinda Karahalios

Parliamentary Assistant to the Minister of Community Safety and Correctional Services
- In office June 7, 2018 – April 4, 2019
- Premier: Doug Ford
- Succeeded by: Position abolished

Member of the Ontario Provincial Parliament for Brampton South
- Incumbent
- Assumed office June 7, 2018
- Preceded by: Constituency established

Personal details
- Born: August 2, 1988 (age 38) Orangeville, Ontario, Canada
- Party: Progressive Conservative
- Education: Wilfrid Laurier University (BBA); University of Windsor (JD)
- Occupation: Lawyer; politician
- Website: prabmeetsarkariampp.ca

Prabmeet Singh Sarkaria is a Canadian lawyer and politician who has been the Ontario minister of transportation since 2023. He has sat as the member of Provincial Parliament (MPP) for Brampton South since 2018, representing the Progressive Conservative (PC) Party.

Sarkaria was previously the associate minister of red tape reduction from 2019 to 2021 and president of the Treasury Board of Ontario from 2021 to 2023. Sarkaria is the first turban-wearing Sikh to be appointed to cabinet.

== Early and personal life ==
Sarkaria was born in Orangeville, Ontario. Sarkaria's parents immigrated from Punjab, India in the 1980s. His father drove a taxi and mother worked in a factory until they later became small business owners, after purchasing an inn outside of Orangeville.

Sarkaria attended Wilfrid Laurier University, where he completed a Bachelor of Business Administration degree, majoring in finance. He worked at TD Securities, before attending law school at the University of Windsor. He worked at Miller Thomson as an associate corporate lawyer until his election.

== Political career ==
Sarkaria was nominated to be the PC Party candidate for Brampton South on December 8, 2016.

Prior to his appointment as a minister, Sarkaria was the chair of the Select Committee on Financial Transparency and also served on the Standing Committee on Justice Policy. He also previously served as the parliamentary assistant to the solicitor general (formerly known as the minister of community safety and correctional services).

He stepped down as the parliamentary assistant to the solicitor general on June 20, 2019 when he was appointed to the Executive Council of Ontario as the associate minister of small business and red tape reduction. Sarkaria is the first turban-wearing Sikh to be appointed to cabinet.

== Electoral results ==
2025 Ontario general election: Brampton South
Party	Candidate	Votes	%	±%
Progressive Conservative	Prabmeet Sarkaria	15,379	52.53	+7.15
Liberal	Bhavik Parikh	9,530	32.55	+4.73
New Democratic	Rajni Sharma	2,413	8.24	–10.90
New Blue	Johnny Nolan	1,042	3.56	+0.15
Green	Rajinder Boyal	911	3.11	–0.48
Total valid votes		29,275	99.40	
Total rejected, unmarked and declined ballots		176	0.60	+0.21
Turnout		29,451	36.10	+0.30
Eligible voters		81,573		
Progressive Conservative hold		Swing		+5.94
Source: Elections Ontario

2022 Ontario general election: Brampton South
Party	Candidate	Votes	%	±%	Expenditures
Progressive Conservative	Prabmeet Sarkaria	12,980	45.38	+4.37	$107,983
Liberal	Marilyn Raphael	7,957	27.82	+8.92	$43,224
New Democratic	Andria Barrett	5,475	19.14	–14.70	$71,066
Green	Ines Espinoza	1,028	3.59	–0.26	$982
New Blue	Mike Mol	974	3.41	–	$8,531
None of the Above	Mehdi Pakzad	188	0.66	–	$403
Total valid votes/expense limit		28,602	99.61	–	$112,273
Total rejected, unmarked and declined ballots		112	0.39	–0.72	
Turnout		28,714	35.81	–14.14	
Eligible voters		80,195			
Progressive Conservative hold		Swing		▼2.28	
Source: Elections Ontario

2018 Ontario general election
Party	Candidate	Votes	%	±%
Progressive Conservative	Prabmeet Sarkaria	15,652	41.01%	
New Democratic	Paramjit Gill	12,919	33.85%	
Liberal	Sukhwant Thethi	7,212	18.89%	
Green	Lindsay Falt	1,472	3.86%	
Libertarian	Brian Watson	363	0.95%	
Trillium	John Grant	337	0.88%	
Freedom	Ted Harlson	214	0.56%	
Total valid votes			100.0	
Source: Elections Ontario
Progressive Conservative pickup new district.				

== Cabinet posts ==
Ford ministry, Province of Ontario (2018–present)
Cabinet posts (2)
Predecessor	Office	Successor
Peter Bethlenfalvy	President of the Treasury Board of Ontario; June 19, 2021–Present	Incumbent
Position established	Associate Minister of Small Business and Red Tape Reduction; June 20, 2019 – June 18, 2021	Nina Tangri
