= Trevor Jones (Canadian politician) =

Canadian provincial politician

The Honourable Trevor Jones ECO MPP
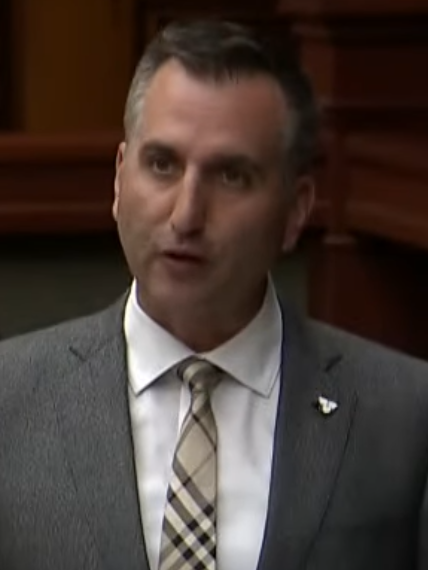
- Jones in 2023

Ontario Minister of Labour, Immigration, Training and Skills Development
- Incumbent
- Assumed office September 10, 2026
- Preceded by: David Piccini

Ontario Minister of Agriculture, Food, and Agribusiness
- In office March 29, 2025 – September 10, 2026
- Preceded by: Rob Flack
- Succeeded by: Sam Oosterhoff

Member of the Ontario Provincial Parliament for Chatham-Kent—Leamington
- Incumbent
- Assumed office June 2, 2022
- Preceded by: Rick Nicholls

Personal details
- Party: Progressive Conservative
- Children: 3

Trevor Jones is a Canadian politician and former police officer who has been the Ontario minister of labour, immigration, training and skills development since September 2026. He was previously Ontario minister of agriculture, food and agribusiness from 2025 to 2026. A member of the Progressive Conservative Party of Ontario, he was first elected to represent Chatham-Kent—Leamington in the Legislative Assembly in the 2022 provincial election. He was previously a Leamington town councillor from 2020 to 2022.

== Early life and career ==
Jones was born in Leamington, Ontario. He attended the University of Windsor, earning a Bachelor of Arts in political science and history in 1997 and a Master of Arts in 2001. In 2002, he joined the Ontario Provincial Police and served in the Chatham-Kent and Essex County detachments, becoming a sergeant in 2009 before taking leave in early 2018.

Jones subsequently entered the private sector and served as the Senior Director of Grower and Community Relations for Mastronardi Produce. He also lobbied the Doug Ford government for Ontario Greenhouse Vegetable Growers.

== Municipal politics ==
In October 2018, Jones ran in the municipal elections for Leamington for one of five council seats and finished sixth. In December 2020, after the death of an incumbent councillor, Jones was appointed councillor as the most successful non-elected candidate to serve the remaining two years in the term. Jones held the post until resigning shortly after being elected in the 2022 Ontario general election.

== Provincial politics ==
In December 2021, Jones was appointed by the Progressive Conservative Party of Ontario as the party's nominee for Chatham-Kent—Leamington in the 2022 Ontario general election after incumbent MPP Rick Nicholls was kicked out of the party in August 2020 for refusing to get the COVID-19 vaccine. On June 2, 2022, Jones was elected, defeating an Ontario New Democratic Party challenger and Nicholls.

On June 29, 2022, Jones was appointed as Parliamentary Assistant to the Minister of Agriculture, Food and Rural Affairs. On September 22, 2023, he additionally became Deputy Government House Leader. On March 28, 2024, he switched Parliamentary Assistant roles, being assigned to the Minister of Economic Development, Job Creation and Trade.

On June 6, 2024, Jones became the Associate Minister of Emergency Preparedness and Response, dropping his Parliamentary Assistant and house leadership duties shortly afterwards. On February 27, 2025, Jones was reelected in the Ontario general election with over 52% of the vote. On March 19, he was promoted to Minister of Agriculture, Food and Agribusiness, replacing Rob Flack.

== Personal life ==
Jones lives in Leamington, Ontario with his wife and three sons.

== Electoral history ==
2025 Ontario general election: Chatham-Kent—Leamington
Party	Candidate	Votes	%	±%	Expenditures
Progressive Conservative	Trevor Jones	22,255	52.03	+4.50	$51,184
Liberal	Bill Kirby	7,856	18.37	–	$5,429
New Democratic	Christian Sachs	7,333	17.14	–13.13	$21,526
New Blue	Rhonda Jubenville	3,387	7.92	+3.95	$30,394
Green	Matthew Davey	1,241	2.90	–0.47	$0
Ontario Party	Phillip St-Laurent	704	1.65	–13.21	$965
Total valid votes/expense limit		42,776	99.11	–	$143,786
Total rejected, unmarked and declined ballots		384	0.89	–4.41	
Turnout		43,160	48.33	+3.46	
Eligible voters		89,308			
Progressive Conservative hold		Swing		+2.25	
Source: Elections Ontario

2022 Ontario general election: Chatham-Kent—Leamington
Party	Candidate	Votes	%	±%	Expenditures
Progressive Conservative	Trevor Jones	17,522	47.52	–4.40	$69,271
New Democratic	Brock McGregor	11,163	30.28	–5.43	$54,449
Ontario Party	Rick Nicholls	5,478	14.86	–37.06	$15,238
New Blue	Rhonda Jubenville	1,463	3.97	–	$18,963
Green	Jennifer Surerus	1,244	3.37	–0.17	$381
Total valid votes/expense limit		36,870	94.70	–	$121,477
Total rejected, unmarked and declined ballots		2,064	5.30	+3.93	
Turnout		38,934	44.87	–11.92	
Eligible voters		86,769			
Progressive Conservative hold		Swing		+0.52	
Source: Elections Ontario
