= Lisa Thompson =

Lisa Thompson may refer to:

- Lisa Thompson (author) (born 1973), British author
- Lisa Thompson (politician) (born 1965), politician in Ontario, Canada
- Lisa Thompson (set decorator), Australian set decorator
- Lisa Joann Thompson (born 1969), American dancer, choreographer, actress and model
