= Pickering—Uxbridge (provincial electoral district) =

Provincial electoral district in Ontario, Canada

Ontario electoral district
- Pickering-Uxbridge in relation to other Greater Toronto Area districts
- Coordinates: 44.042°N 79.181°W

Provincial electoral district
- Legislature: Legislative Assembly of Ontario
MPP
Peter Bethlenfalvy
Progressive Conservative
- District created: 2015
- First contested: 2018
- Last contested: 2025

Demographics
- Population (2016): 112,945
- Electors (2018): 91,154
- Area (km²): 659
- Pop. density (per km²): 171.4
- Census division: Durham
- Census subdivision(s): Pickering, Uxbridge

Pickering—Uxbridge is a provincial electoral district in Ontario, Canada. It elects one member to the Legislative Assembly of Ontario. This riding was created in 2015.

== Members of Provincial Parliament ==
Ajax
Assembly	Years	Member	Party
Riding created from Ajax—Pickering, Durham and Pickering—Scarborough East
42nd	2018–present	Peter Bethlenfalvy	Progressive Conservative
43rd	2022–present	Peter Bethlenfalvy	Progressive Conservative

== Election results ==
Winning party in each polling division of Pickering—Uxbridge at the 2025 Ontario general election

2025 Ontario general election
** Preliminary results — Not yet official **
Party	Candidate	Votes	%	±%	Expenditures
Progressive Conservative	Peter Bethlenfalvy	21,976	48.2	+3.8	
Liberal	Ibrahim Daniyal	18,085	39.6	+11.0	
New Democratic	Khalid Ahmed	3,281	7.2	–8.8	
Green	Mini Batra	1,302	2.9	–2.3	
New Blue	Adrian Nolan	412	0.9	–0.4	
Ontario Party	Victoria Devenport	384	0.8	–3.3	
Centrist	Mansoor Qureshi	126	0.3	+0.1	
Moderate	Netalia Duboisky	73	0.2	±0.0	
Total valid votes/expense limit					
Total rejected, unmarked, and declined ballots					
Turnout			46.0	+0.7	
Eligible voters		99,168			
Progressive Conservative hold		Swing		–3.6	
Source: Elections Ontario

Winning party in each polling division of Pickering—Uxbridge at the 2022 Ontario general election

2022 Ontario general election
Party	Candidate	Votes	%	±%
Progressive Conservative	Peter Bethlenfalvy	19,208	44.43	+2.23
Liberal	Ibrahim Daniyal	12,345	28.56	+8.16
New Democratic	Khalid Ahmed	6,934	16.04	−15.98
Green	Julia Rondinone	2,266	5.24	+1.28
Ontario Party	Lisa Robinson	1,790	4.14	
New Blue	Elizabeth Tallis	543	1.26	
Centrist	Hasan Syed	76	0.18	
Moderate	Netalia Duboisky	70	0.16	−0.05
Total valid votes		43,232	100.0	
Total rejected, unmarked, and declined ballots		321		
Turnout		43,553	45.29	
Eligible voters		95,468		
Progressive Conservative hold		Swing		−2.96
Source(s): "Summary of Valid Votes Cast for Each Candidate" (PDF). Elections Ontario. 2022. Archived from the original on 18 May 2023.; "Statistical Summary by Electoral District" (PDF). Elections Ontario. 2022. Archived from the original on 21 May 2023.

2018 Ontario general election
Party	Candidate	Votes	%
Progressive Conservative	Peter Bethlenfalvy	22,447	42.20
New Democratic	Nerissa Cariño	17,033	32.02
Liberal	Ibrahim Daniyal	10,851	20.40
Green	Adam Narraway	2,105	3.96
Libertarian	Brendan Reilly	273	0.51
Independent	William Myers	194	0.36
Moderate	Netalia Duboisky	111	0.21
Independent	Michelle Francis	96	0.18
Independent	Eric Sivadas	83	0.16
Total valid votes		53,193	100.0
Progressive Conservative pickup new district.			
Source: Elections Ontario

== See also ==
- List of Ontario provincial electoral districts
- Canadian provincial electoral districts
