= Peter Bethlenfalvy =

Canadian businessman and politician

The Honourable Peter Bethlenfalvy ECO MPP
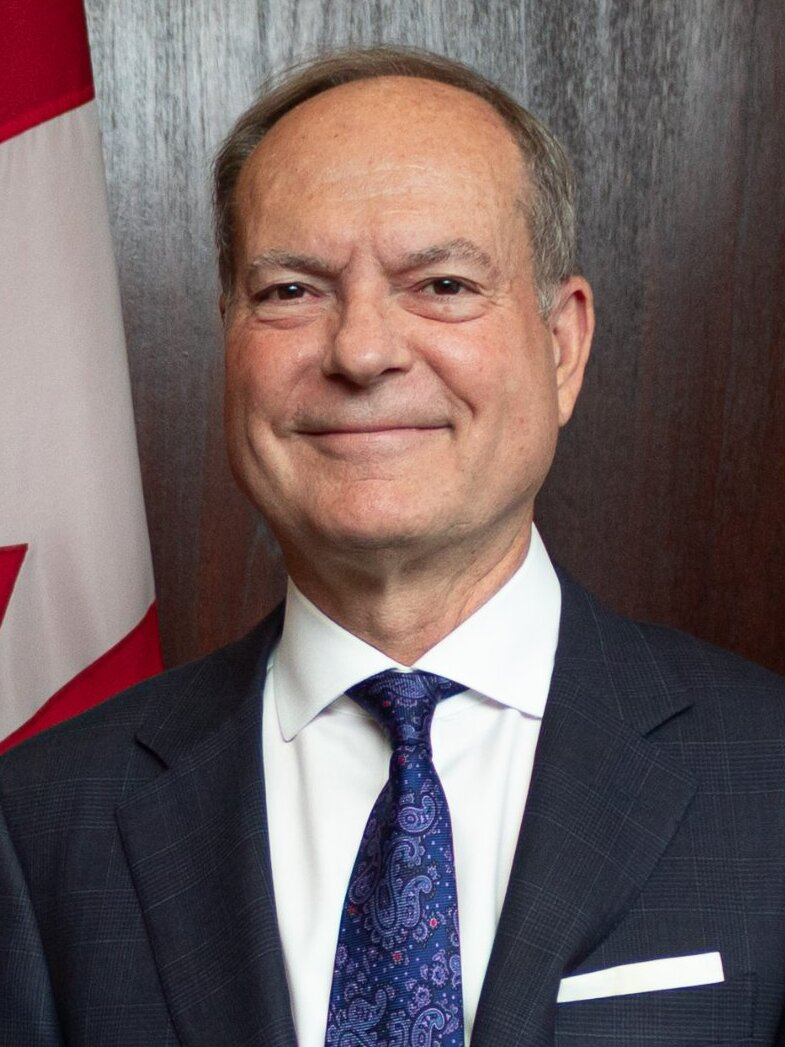
- Bethlenfalvy in 2025

Ontario Minister of Finance
- Incumbent
- Assumed office December 31, 2020
- Premier: Doug Ford
- Preceded by: Rod Phillips

President of the Treasury Board of Ontario
- In office June 5, 2026 – September 10, 2026
- Premier: Doug Ford
- Preceded by: Caroline Mulroney
- Succeeded by: Kinga Surma
- In office June 29, 2018 – June 18, 2021
- Premier: Doug Ford
- Preceded by: Eleanor McMahon
- Succeeded by: Prabmeet Sarkaria

Member of the Ontario Provincial Parliament for Pickering—Uxbridge
- Incumbent
- Assumed office June 7, 2018
- Preceded by: Tracy MacCharles

Personal details
- Born: Montreal, Quebec, Canada
- Party: Progressive Conservative
- Education: McGill University (BA, MBA); University of Toronto (MA)
- Occupation: Politician; businessman
- Website: peterbethlenfalvympp.ca

Peter Bethlenfalvy is a Canadian businessman and politician who has been the Ontario minister of finance since 2020. Bethlenfalvy has sat in the Ontario Legislature as the member of Provincial Parliament (MPP) for Pickering—Uxbridge since the 2018 Ontario provincial election, representing the Progressive Conservative (PC) Party. He was previously the president of the Treasury Board from 2018 to 2021 and in 2026.

== Early life and education ==
Bethlenfalvy was born in Montreal, Quebec, to Hungarian immigrants. He earned a bachelor's degree in physiology, a master's degree in business administration from McGill University, and a master of arts degree from the University of Toronto.

In business, Bethlenfalvy served as the chief investment officer at CST Consultants Inc. He has also held various other senior financial roles: senior vice-president of financial regulations at Manulife Financial, co-president of DBRS Ltd. (where the agency downgraded Ontario's long- and short-term debt ratings in 2009) and as president and chief operating officer of TD Securities in New York.

== Political career ==
He was elected to the Legislative Assembly of Ontario in the 2018 provincial election. Pickering—Uxbridge was a new provincial riding for 2018. It was created out of parts of Pickering—Scarborough East, Ajax—Pickering and Durham. The PC Party formed government and on June 29, 2018, Bethlenfalvy was appointed president of the Treasury Board in Premier Doug Ford's Cabinet.

In office, Bethlenfalvy has worked on projects such as a line-by-line review of government spending, government modernization initiatives, and controversially, Bill 124, which limits public sector compensation.

Bethlenfalvy became finance minister after the resignation of Rod Phillips on December 31, 2020.

The government's 2025 budget reported a $14.6 billion deficit; in 2026, the Ford government's budget deficit was nearly double what was projected in 2025, reaching $13.8 billion.

== Electoral record ==
2025 Ontario general election: Pickering—Uxbridge
Party	Candidate	Votes	%	±%
Progressive Conservative	Peter Bethlenfalvy	21,975	48.06	+3.63
Liberal	Ibrahim Daniyal	18,072	39.52	+10.97
New Democratic	Khalid Ahmed	3,381	7.39	–8.64
Green	Mini Batra	1,300	2.84	–2.40
New Blue	Adrian Nolan	411	0.90	–0.36
Ontario Party	Victoria Devenport	384	0.84	–3.30
Centrist	Mansoor Qureshi	127	0.28	+0.10
Moderate	Netalia Duboisky	73	0.16	–0.00
Total valid votes		45,723	99.68	
Total rejected, unmarked and declined ballots		147	0.32	–0.42
Turnout		45,870	45.65	+0.35
Eligible voters		100,493		
Progressive Conservative hold		Swing		–3.67
Source: Elections Ontario

2022 Ontario general election: Pickering—Uxbridge
Party	Candidate	Votes	%	±%
Progressive Conservative	Peter Bethlenfalvy	19,208	44.43	+2.23
Liberal	Ibrahim Daniyal	12,345	28.56	+8.16
New Democratic	Khalid Ahmed	6,934	16.04	–15.98
Green	Julia Rondinone	2,266	5.24	+1.28
Ontario Party	Lisa Robinson	1,790	4.14	–
New Blue	Elizabeth Tallis	543	1.26	–
Centrist	Hasan Syed	76	0.18	–
Moderate	Netalia Duboisky	70	0.16	–0.05
Total valid votes		43,232	99.26	
Total rejected, unmarked and declined ballots		321	0.74	–0.18
Turnout		43,553	45.29	–13.61
Eligible voters		96,164		
Progressive Conservative hold		Swing		–2.96
Source: Elections Ontario

2018 Ontario general election
Party	Candidate	Votes	%
Progressive Conservative	Peter Bethlenfalvy	22,447	42.20
New Democratic	Nerissa Cariño	17,033	32.02
Liberal	Ibrahim Daniyal	10,851	20.40
Green	Adam Narraway	2,105	3.96
Libertarian	Brendan Reilly	273	0.51
Independent	William Myers	194	0.36
Moderate	Netalia Duboisky	111	0.21
Independent	Michelle Francis	96	0.18
Independent	Eric Sivadas	83	0.16
Total valid votes		53,193	100.0
Progressive Conservative pickup new district.			
Source: Elections Ontario

== Cabinet Positions ==
Political offices
Ford ministry, Province of Ontario (2018–present)
Preceded by Eleanor McMahon	President of the Treasury Board; June 29, 2018–present	Incumbent
Preceded by Rod Phillips	Minister of Finance; December 31, 2020–present	Incumbent
