= Brian Saunderson =

Canadian rower and politician

The Honourable Brian Saunderson ECO KC MPP
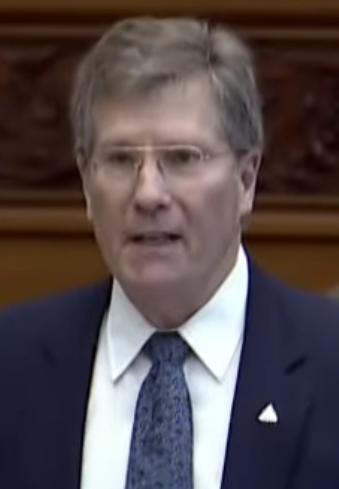
- Saunderson in 2023

Minister of Sport
- Incumbent
- Assumed office September 10, 2026
- Premier: Doug Ford
- Preceded by: Neil Lumsden

Member of the Ontario Provincial Parliament for Simcoe—Grey
- Incumbent
- Assumed office June 2, 2022
- Preceded by: Jim Wilson

Mayor of Collingwood
- In office 2018–2022

Personal details
- Born: November 16, 1961 (age 64)
- Party: Progressive Conservative Party of Ontario
- Parent: Bill Saunderson (father)
- Education: University of Western Ontario (BA); University of Ottawa (LL.B.)

Brian George Saunderson KC MPP (born November 16, 1961) is a Canadian politician and former Olympic rower. He has represented the riding of Simcoe—Grey in the Legislative Assembly of Ontario since 2022 and served as the mayor of Collingwood from 2018 to 2022. He competed at the 1988 Summer Olympics and the 1992 Summer Olympics. He was appointed Minister of Sport on September 10, 2026.

== Early life ==
He is the son of former MPP Bill Saunderson. Prior to entering politics, Saunderson competed at the 1988 Summer Olympics and the 1992 Summer Olympics.

== Political career ==
In 2018, Saunderson was elected mayor of the town of Collingwood. From 2014 to 2018, he served as deputy mayor.

In June 2021, Saunderson was named the Ontario Progressive Conservative Party's candidate for Simcoe—Grey in the 2022 Ontario election after being recommended by Doug Ford. He won the election and stepped down as mayor.

== Electoral history ==
2022 Ontario general election: Simcoe—Grey
Party	Candidate	Votes	%	±%
Progressive Conservative	Brian Saunderson	27,067	51.18	−4.75
Liberal	Ted Crysler	11,687	22.10	+7.70
New Democratic	Keith Nunn	5,849	11.06	−10.99
Green	Allan Kuhn	4,742	8.97	+2.09
New Blue	David Ghobrial	2,147	4.06	
Ontario Party	Rodney Sacrey	1,039	1.96	
None of the Above	Billy G. Gordon	355	0.67	
Total valid votes		52,886	100.0	
Total rejected, unmarked, and declined ballots		255		
Turnout		53,141	43.52	
Eligible voters		120,499		
Progressive Conservative gain from Independent		Swing		−6.22
Source(s): "Summary of Valid Votes Cast for Each Candidate" (PDF). Elections Ontario. 2022. Archived from the original on May 18, 2023.; "Statistical Summary by Electoral District" (PDF). Elections Ontario. 2022. Archived from the original on May 21, 2023.
