= Ministry of Research, Innovation and Science =

Canadian government ministry

The Ministry of Research, Innovation and Science was a government ministry of the Province of Ontario. Founded in 2005, the ministry became part of the Ministry of Economic Development and Innovation in 2011. It intermittently became a separate ministry in again from 2013 until 2018, when it became part of the Ministry of Economic Development, Job Creation and Trade.

== History ==
The research and innovation agenda in Ontario was previously the responsibility of the Science and Technology Division of the Ontario Ministry of Enterprise, Opportunity and Innovation (MEOI). During the Conservative governments of Harris and Eves, the province organized itself to facilitate partnerships between the public sector and private sector. One such arrangement was a sole-source management agreement between the MEOI Science and Technology Division and the Innovation Institute of Ontario (IIO). The IIO is essentially a private corporation that was contracted to administer the $1.25 billion Ontario Research and Development Challenge Fund.

The Science and Technology Division of MEOI was the subject of a provincial audit in 2003. The Provincial Auditor was particularly critical and in the report said: "A major concern was that the Ministry had committed to spending $4.3 billion without an overall strategic plan to set parameters and consistent policies for existing programs or to guide the development of new programs to meet the objectives of promoting innovation, economic growth, and job creation." At that time the division had 50 staff, had spent $1.3 billion, and had committed a further $4.8 billion primarily on research grants to universities, colleges, and research hospitals.

== Funding ==
Research funding is also a significant source of funding for higher education. The creation of this new ministry is closely aligned with the 2005 provincial budget, and the "Reaching Higher" initiative to provide $6.2 billion in funding for higher education in 2005-2010.

Funding for research and innovation is also provided by the Canadian Government, and administered through Industry Canada. The Provincial-Federal relationship will be key to the success of the new Ontario Ministry of Research and Innovation, and may present an opportunity for Premier McGuinty to further the "Strong Ontario" agenda which is attempting to close the $23 billion gap between the tax dollars collected in Ontario by the Federal Government, and the amount the Federal Government returned to the province through federal programs.

== Initiatives ==
The Ontario Ministry of Research and Innovation administered these programs:

- Early Researcher Awards
- Green Focus on Innovation and Technology (GreenFIT)
- Green Schools Pilot Initiative
- Health Technology Exchange
- Innovation Demonstration Fund
- International Strategic Opportunities Program (ISOP)
- Investment Accelerator Fund
- Ontario-China Research and Innovation Fund (OCRIF)
- Ontario Centres of Excellence
- Ontario Emerging Technologies Fund (OETF)
- Ontario Innovation Agenda
- Ontario Institute for Cancer Research
- Ontario's Life Sciences Commercialization Strategy
- Ontario Network of Excellence
- Ontario Research Fund
- Ontario Tax Exemption for Commercialization (OTEC)
- Ontario Water Innovation Award
- Post-Doctoral Fellowship (PDF) Program
- Premier's Innovation Awards

== Ministers ==
=== Ministers of Research and Innovation ===
- Dalton McGuinty June 29, 2005 – October 30, 2007
- John Wilkinson October 30, 2007 – June 24, 2009
- John Milloy June 24, 2009 – August 18, 2010
- Glen Murray August 18, 2010 – October 20, 2011
- combined with Ministry of Economic Development, October 20, 2011 - February 11, 2013
- Reza Moridi February 11, 2013 – June 13, 2016

=== Ministers of Research, Innovation, and Science ===
- Reza Moridi June 13, 2016 - June 29, 2018
