= Official Opposition Shadow Cabinet of the 43rd Legislative Assembly of Ontario =

The Official Opposition Shadow Cabinet of the 43rd Legislative Assembly of Ontario, Canada was the shadow cabinet of the main Opposition party, responsible for holding Ministers to account and for developing and disseminating the party's policy positions. In the 43rd Legislative Assembly of Ontario, which began in 2022, the Official Opposition was formed by the Ontario New Democratic Party.

The first shadow cabinet was announced by interim leader Peter Tabuns in July 2022. The shuffle of the Shadow Cabinet was announced by the Ontario NDP in March 2023, after the election of new leader Marit Stiles.

Critic	Portfolio	Duration
Marit Stiles	Leader of the Opposition	2023–present
Marit Stiles	Intergovernmental Affairs	2023–2025
Marit Stiles	Education	2022
Jill Andrew	Women's Social and Economic Opportunity, Culture, Heritage	2022–2025
Teresa Armstrong	Pensions	2022–2025
Teresa Armstrong	Affordability	2022–2023
Teresa Armstrong	Child Care	2023–2025
Doly Begum	Deputy Leader	2022–2025
Doly Begum	Immigration Services, International Credentials	2022–2025
Jessica Bell	Housing	2022–2025
Guy Bourgouin	Francophone Affairs	2022–2025
Guy Bourgouin	Forestry (formerly Natural Resources and Forestry)	2022–2025
Jeff Burch	Caucus Chair	2022–2025
Jeff Burch	Municipal Affairs	2022–2025
Catherine Fife	Finance and Treasury Board	2022–2025
Jennifer French	Transportation, Highways, Infrastructure	2022–2025
Wayne Gates	Long-Term Care, Retirement Homes and Home Care	2022–2025
France Gelinas	Health	2022–2025
Chris Glover	Tech Development and Innovation	2022–2025
Chris Glover	Democratic Reform	2023–2025
Chris Glover	Small Business	2022–2023
Lisa Gretzky	Deputy House Leader	2022–2023
Lisa Gretzky	Mental Health and Addictions	2022–2025
Lisa Gretzky	Poverty and Homelessness reduction	2023–2025
Joel Harden	Transit & Active Transportation	2022–2025
Andrea Horwath	Ethics and Accountability	2022
Sarah Jama	Accessibility and Disability Justice, Youth	2023
Bhutila Karpoche	GTA Issues	2022–2025
Bhutila Karpoche	Affordability	2023–2025
Bhutila Karpoche	Early Childhood Development and Childcare	2022–2023
Terence Kernaghan	Deputy House Leader	2023–2025
Terence Kernaghan	Economic Development, Job Creation and Trade	2022–2025
Laura Mae Lindo	Anti-Racism and Equity	2022–2023
Laura Mae Lindo	Colleges and Universities	2022–2023
Sol Mamakwa	Deputy Leader	2022–2025
Sol Mamakwa	Indigenous and Treaty Relations, Northern Development	2022–2025
Michael Mantha	Mining	2023
Michael Mantha	Natural Resources, Mines, Ring of Fire	2022–2023
Chandra Pasma	Education	2022–2025
Chandra Pasma	Poverty and Homelessness Reduction	2022–2023
Tom Rakocevic	Consumer Protection and Auto Insurance	2022–2025
Peggy Sattler	Chief Whip	2023–2025
Peggy Sattler	House Leader	2022–2023
Peggy Sattler	Colleges & Universities	2023–2025
Peggy Sattler	Democratic Reform	2022–2023
Sandy Shaw	Environment, Conservation and Parks	2022–2025
Jennie Stevens	Sports, Tourism, Veterans, Legion and Military Affairs	2022–2025
Peter Tabuns	Leader of the Opposition	2022–2023
Peter Tabuns	Intergovernmental Affairs	2022–2023
Peter Tabuns	Energy and Climate Action	2023–2025
Monique Taylor	Deputy Whip	2022–2025
Monique Taylor	Children, Community and Social Services	2022–2025
John Vanthof	Opposition House Leader	2022–2025
John Vanthof	Chief Whip	2022–2023
John Vanthof	Agriculture, Food and Rural Affairs, Solicitor General	2022–2025
Lise Vaugeois	Seniors	2022–2025
Lise Vaugeois	WSIB & Injured Workers	2023–2025
Lise Vaugeois	Persons Living with Disabilities and Accessibility	2022–2023
Jamie West	Labour, Training and Skills Development	2022–2025
Kristyn Wong-Tam	Attorney General, 2SLGBTQ+ Issues	2022–2025
Kristyn Wong-Tam	Small Business	2023–2025

== See also ==
- Executive Council of Ontario
- Ford Ministry
