= Ministry of Economic Development, Job Creation and Trade =

Provincial ministry in Ontario, Canada

- Ministère du Développement économique, de la Création d’emplois et du Commerce (French)
- Government of Ontario wordmark

Ministry overview
- Formed: 1944
- Jurisdiction: Government of Ontario
- Headquarters: 777 Bay Street 18th floor Toronto, Ontario M5G 2N4
- Minister responsible: Vic Fedeli, Minister of Economic Development, Job Creation and Trade
- Website: ontario.ca/page/ministry-economic-development-job-creation-trade

The Ministry of Economic Development, Job Creation and Trade (formally known as Ministry of Economic Development and Growth) in the Canadian province of Ontario is responsible for programs to attract and retain business and economic development in the province. This is pursued through research and development funding, business advisory services, career exploration opportunities and business startup programs for youth, skills development and marketing Ontario to potential international business investors.

It was previously responsible for the Liquor Control Board of Ontario and the Ontario Lottery and Gaming Corporation, though this responsibility has been shifted to the Ministry of Government Services.

== History ==
Responsibilities for industries and economic development in the Ontario government shifted over time as the province's economy evolved.

Since farming was the primary means of economic production in the 1800s, responsibility for economic development and planning, as far as a going concern of the government, rest with the agriculture department. Prior to Canadian confederation, the Bureau of Agriculture of the Province of Canada was responsible for collecting facts and statistics relating to the agricultural, mechanical and manufacturing interests. Soon after the confederation in 1867, the Act for the Encouragement of Agriculture, Horticulture, Arts, and Manufactures was enacted, which established the Bureau of Agriculture and Arts within the Department of Agriculture and Public Works. "Arts", at the time, referred to the practical application of an industrial, manufacturing, or scientific pursuit, rather than artistic pursuit or fine art. The annual report of the bureau, tabled by its departmental minister the Commissioner of Agriculture and Public Works, reported on policy issues such as tariff, technology innovation, industrial development, issues that would in modern time be in the purview of the economic development ministry.

In 1882, the Bureau of Industries assumed responsibility for sectors other than farming. Although the Bureau was under the general direction of the Commissioner of Agriculture (or the Minister of Agriculture after 1888), the day to day operations were carried out by a small staff under the direction of the Secretary of the Bureau of Industries. From 1880 on however, the focus of that bureau was agricultural in nature. In the late 1800s and early 1900s, the responsibilities for various manufacturing industrial matters were shared at various times with the Department of the Provincial Secretary, Department of Education, and the Bureau of Labour among others.

The Department of Planning and Development was established in 1944. Initially, its mandate was focused in postwar rehabilitation efforts. Over time, the department was mandated to work with agricultural, industrial, labour, mining, trade and other associations and organisations and with public and private sector enterprises in order to create and maintain productive employment and to develop the human and material resources of the province. In addition to trade and industry, the department at various times also had responsibilities over immigration, community planning, conservation, civil defence/emergency management.

Given the rapid post war economic expansion, economic development and planning becoming a primary concern of the government. In 1956, a new Department of Economics reporting to the Treasurer (finance minister) was established and specifically mandated to study and advise on economic and financial policy. In 1961 the planning and development was briefly renamed the Department of Commerce and Development. In December 1961, the two departments merged and was renamed the Department of Economics and Development.

In 1968, the department was renamed the Department of Trade and Development. In April 1972, the department merged with the Department of Tourism and Information to form the Ministry of Industry and Tourism.

=== Frequent rebranding ===
A standalone economic portfolio was recreated in 1982, named Ministry of Industry and Trade. Since then, the ministry has been the target for frequent superficial, transient name changes by government of all three stripes. Since its separation from the tourism ministry, the economic ministry's went through fourteen instances of name changes, by far the most instances of name change experienced by any ministry within the Ontario government, and only four of those instances entailed actual substantive realignment of portfolio responsibilities with other ministries. (Note: The 1995 recoupling and 1999 decoupling with the tourism ministry; the 2014 coupling and 2016 decoupling with the infrastructure ministry) The government of the day routinely modify the ministry name sometimes with buzzword or gimmicky phrasing to draw attention to the government's shifting policy priorities or specific agenda. Turf wars between ministers also caused some of the name changes. The Ford ministry upon taking office changed the economic ministry's name to Ministry of Economic Development, Job Creation and Trade, but had kept it as such since for eight years (and counting), making it the ministry's most durable name in four decades.

Perhaps not intending for any durability for such rebranding exercises, the successive ministries carried out the dozen or so name changes with orders-in-council and rarely bothered to formalize them with enabling legislations or corresponding legislative amendments. For example, the NDP Rae ministry renamed the ministry as the Ministry of Economic and Trade in 1993, but the ministry's enabling legislation was not amended to formalize the change until 2006.Good Government Act. Statutes of the Province of Ontario. Vol. SO 2006. 2006. c.19, sch.I. The ministry's name changed four times in the intervening period. Since 2006, the ministry changed its name seven more times, and not once was the ministry's enabling legislation amended to reflect the change. While the economic ministry was the primary target for such improvised rebranding, the practice of renaming ministry for transitory communications purposes had spread to many other ministry in recent years.

=== Related ministries ===
Successive ministries since the 1980s have recognized the growing importance of technology and innovation industries to the future strength of the province economy. Both the Liberal Peterson ministry and the Progressive Conservative Harris and Eves ministry had employed ministry name changes as a mean to highlight their intention to prioritize this policy area.

To place increased emphasis on enabling leading edge research and attracting companies and jobs of innovation sectors to Ontario, the McGuinty ministry created a related Ministry of Research and Innovation in 2005, with Premier McGuinty personally taking on the portfolio as its inaugural minister. It was briefly merged back into the main economic ministry in 2011, but re-emerged as a separate portfolio in 2013 in the Wynne ministry. While politically a standalone ministry for over a decade, during its second stint its operational independence was quite apparently limited, as it regained neither its own deputy minister (the civil service head) nor its own estimates, a peculiarity given its sizable budget

A related Ministry of International Trade existed between 2008 and 2009 , and again from 2016 and 2018. In 2017. During these period the economic portfolio was, at least on paper, held by three different ministers as three separate portfolios.

In 2022, the Ford ministry created a Ministry of Red Tape Reduction.

== List of ministers ==
| Principal Minister | Term of office | | Ministry (Party) | additional minister | | |
|---|---|---|---|---|---|---|
| Minister of Planning and Development | | | Drew-Kennedy; PC | | | |
| Dana Porter | May 8, 1944 | Oct 19, 1948 | Drew-Kennedy; PC | | | |
| Art Welsh | Oct 19, 1948 | May 4, 1949 | Drew-Kennedy; PC | | | |
| William Griesinger | May 4, 1949 | Jan 20, 1953 | Frost; PC | | | |
| Bill Warrender | Jan 20, 1953 | Aug 17, 1955 | Frost; PC | | | |
| William Nickle | Aug 17, 1955 | Nov 8, 1961 | Frost; PC | | | |
| Minister of Commerce and Development | | | Robarts; PC | | | |
| Robert Macaulay | Nov 8, 1961 | Dec 15, 1961 | Robarts; PC | | | |
| Minister of Economics and Development | | | Robarts; PC | | | |
| Robert Macaulay | Dec 15, 1961 | Oct 16, 1963 | Robarts; PC | | | |
| James Allan | Oct 16, 1963 | Nov 8, 1963 | Robarts; PC | | | |
| Stan Randall | Nov 8, 1963 | April 11, 1968 | Robarts; PC | | | |
| Minister of Trade and Development | | | Robarts; PC | | | |
| Stan Randall | April 11, 1968 | March 1, 1971 | Robarts; PC | | | |
| Allan Grossman | March 1, 1971 | Feb 2, 1972 | Davis; PC | | | |
| John White | Feb 2, 1972 | April 7, 1972 | Davis; PC | | | |
| Minister of Industry and Tourism | | | Davis; PC | | | |
| John White | April 7, 1972 | Jan 15, 1973 | Davis; PC | | | |
| Claude Bennett | Jan 15, 1973 | Jan 21, 1978 | Davis; PC | | | |
| John Reginald Rhodes | Jan 21, 1978 | Sep 25, 1978 | Davis; PC | | | |
| Larry Grossman | Oct 18, 1978 | Feb 13, 1982 | Davis; PC | | | |
| Minister of Industry and Trade Development | | | Davis; PC | | | |
| Gordon Walker | Feb 13, 1982 | July 6, 1983 | Davis; PC | | | |
| Frank Miller | July 6, 1983 | Feb 8, 1985 (Note: held portfolio when elected leader of the Progressive Conservatives Party and became Premier) | Davis; PC | | | |
| Minister of Industry and Trade | | | Miller; PC | | | |
| Andy Brandt | Feb 8, 1985 | June 26, 1985 | Miller; PC | | | |
| Minister of Industry, Trade and Technology | | | Peterson; Liberal | | | |
| Hugh O'Neil | June 26, 1985 | Sep 29, 1987 | Peterson; Liberal | | | |
| Monte Kwinter | Sep 29, 1987 | Oct 1, 1990 | Peterson; Liberal | | | |
| Allan Pilkey | Oct 1, 1990 | July 31, 1991 | Rae; NDP | | | |
| Ed Philip | July 31, 1991 | Feb 3, 1993 | Rae; NDP | | | |
| Minister of Economic Development and Trade | | | Rae; NDP | | | |
| Frances Lankin | Feb 3, 1993 | June 26, 1995 | Rae; NDP | | | |
| Minister of Economic Development, Trade and Tourism | | | Harris; PC | | | |
| Bill Saunderson | June 26, 1995 | Oct 10, 1997 | Harris; PC | Energy, Science and Technology | | |
| Al Palladini | Oct 10, 1997 | June 17, 1999 | Harris; PC | Jim Wilson | October 10, 1997 | April 14, 2002 |
| Economic Development and Trade | | | Harris; PC | Jim Wilson | October 10, 1997 | April 14, 2002 |
| Al Palladini | June 17, 1999 | February 7, 2001 (Note: resignation - personal reasons, died shortly after) | Harris; PC | Jim Wilson | October 10, 1997 | April 14, 2002 |
| Bob Runciman | February 8, 2001 | April 14, 2002 | Harris; PC | Jim Wilson | October 10, 1997 | April 14, 2002 |
| Enterprise, Opportunity and Innovation | | | Eves; PC | Associate Minister | | |
| Jim Flaherty | April 15, 2002 | Oct 22, 2003 | Eves; PC | David Turnbull | April 15, 2002 | Oct 22, 2003 |
| Economic Development and Trade | | | McGuinty; Liberal | Research and Innovation | | |
| Joseph Cordiano | Oct 23, 2003 | Sep 18, 2006 (Note: resignation - retired from politics) | McGuinty; Liberal | Dalton McGuinty (Note: while Premier) | June 29, 2005 | Oct 15, 2007 |
| Sandra Pupatello | Sep 16, 2006 | Sep 18, 2008 | McGuinty; Liberal | John Wilkinson | Oct 30, 2007 | June 24, 2009 |
| Economic Development | | | McGuinty; Liberal | International Trade and Investment | | |
| Michael Bryant | Sep 18, 2008 | May 25, 2009 (Note: resignation - became CEO of Invest Toronto) | McGuinty; Liberal | Sandra Pupatello | Sep 18, 2008 | June 24, 2009 |
| Dalton McGuinty (Note: while Premier) acting | May 25, 2009 | June 24, 2009 | McGuinty; Liberal | Sandra Pupatello | Sep 18, 2008 | June 24, 2009 |
| Economic Development and Trade | | | McGuinty; Liberal | Research and Innovation | | |
| Sandra Pupatello | June 24, 2009 | Oct 20, 2011 | McGuinty; Liberal | John Milloy | June 24, 2009 | Aug 18, 2010 |
| Minister of Economic Development and Innovation | | | McGuinty; Liberal | Glen Murray | Aug 18, 2010 | Oct 20, 2011 |
| Brad Duguid | Oct 20, 2011 | Feb 11, 2013 | McGuinty; Liberal | | | |
| Economic Development, Trade and Employment | | | Wynne); Liberal | Research and Innovation | | |
| Eric Hoskins | Feb 11, 2013 | June 24, 2014 | Wynne); Liberal | Reza Moridi | Feb 11, 2013 | June 13, 2016 |
| Economic Development, Employment & Infrastructure | | | Wynne); Liberal | Reza Moridi | Feb 11, 2013 | June 13, 2016 |
| Brad Duguid | June 24, 2014 | June 13, 2016 | Wynne); Liberal | Reza Moridi | Feb 11, 2013 | June 13, 2016 |
| Economic Development and Growth | | | Wynne); Liberal | Research and Innovation | | |
| Brad Duguid | June 13, 2016 | Jan 17, 2018 | Wynne); Liberal | Reza Moridi | June 13, 2016 | June 29, 2018 |
| Brad Duguid | June 13, 2016 | Jan 17, 2018 | Wynne); Liberal | International Trade | | |
| Steven Del Duca | Jan 17, 2018 | June 29, 2018 | Wynne); Liberal | Michael Chan | June 13, 2016 | June 29, 2018 |
| Steven Del Duca | Jan 17, 2018 | June 29, 2018 | Wynne); Liberal | (responsible for Small Business) | | |
| Steven Del Duca | Jan 17, 2018 | June 29, 2018 | Wynne); Liberal | Jeff Leal | Jan 12, 2017 | June 29, 2018 |
| Minister of Economic Development, Job Creation and Trade | | | Ford; PC | | | |
| Jim Wilson | June 29, 2018 | Nov 2, 2018 (Note: resignation - upon allegation by staff of misconduct) | Ford; PC | | | |
| Todd Smith | Nov 2, 2018 (Note: Interim minister prior to November 5, 2018) | June 20, 2019 | Ford; PC | Associate Min. (Small Business & Red Tape Reduction) | | |
| Vic Fedeli (Note: Concurrently Chair of Cabinet) | June 20, 2019 | present | Ford; PC | Prabmeet Sarkaria | June 20, 2019 | June 18, 2021 |
| Vic Fedeli | June 20, 2019 | present | Ford; PC | Nina Tangri | June 18, 2021 | June 24, 2022 |
| Vic Fedeli | June 20, 2019 | present | Ford; PC | Associate Min. (Small Business) | | |
| Vic Fedeli | June 20, 2019 | present | Ford; PC | Nina Tangri | September 4, 2023 | present |
| Vic Fedeli | June 20, 2019 | present | Ford; PC | Red Tape Reduction | | |
| Vic Fedeli | June 20, 2019 | present | Ford; PC | Parm Gill | June 24, 2022 | Jan 25, 2024 |
| Vic Fedeli | June 20, 2019 | present | Ford; PC | Mike Harris Jr. | June 6, 2024 | March 19, 2025 |
| Vic Fedeli | June 20, 2019 | present | Ford; PC | Andrea Khanjin | March 19, 2025 | present |
