= 2025 Ontario general election =

Canadian provincial election

- February 27, 2025

124 seats of the Legislative Assembly of Ontario 63 seats needed for a majority
- Opinion polls
- Turnout: 45.40% (▲1.34 pp)
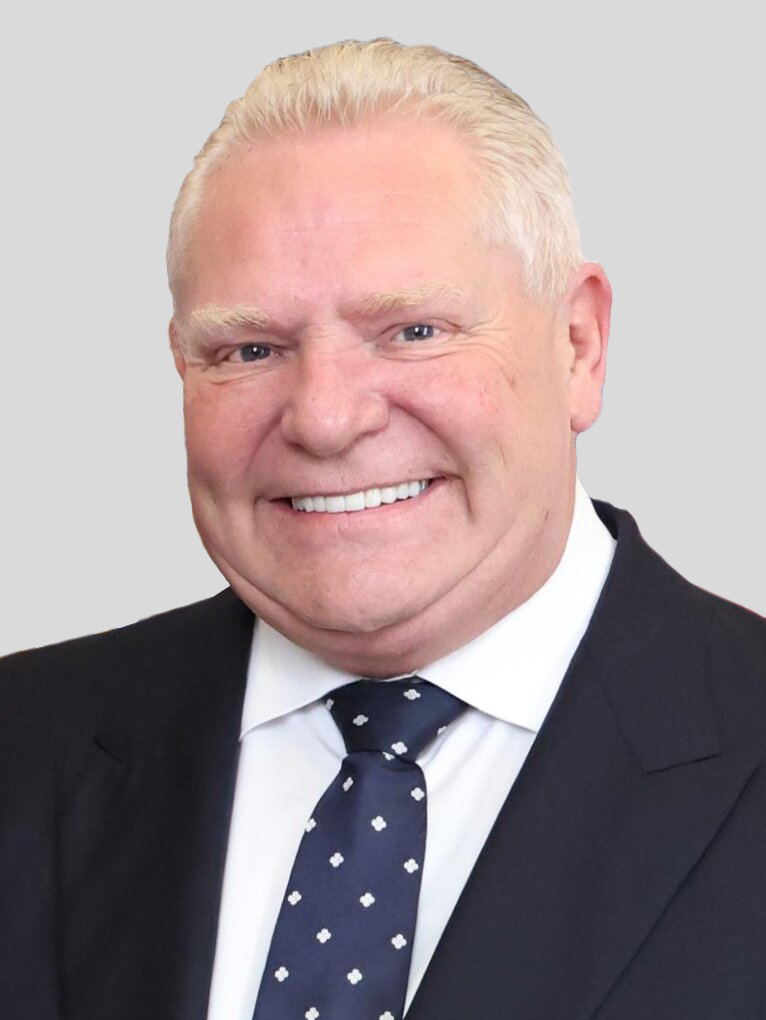

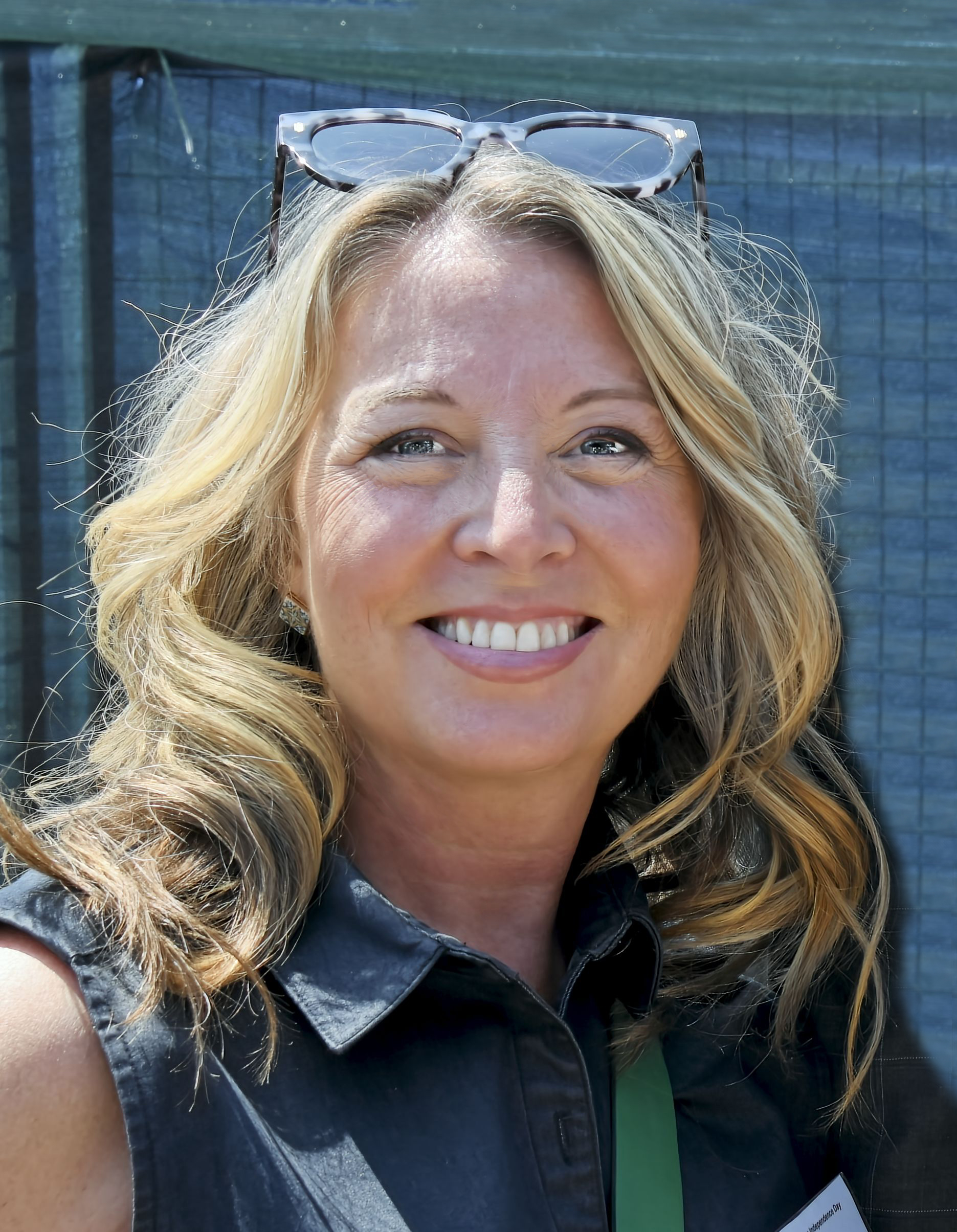

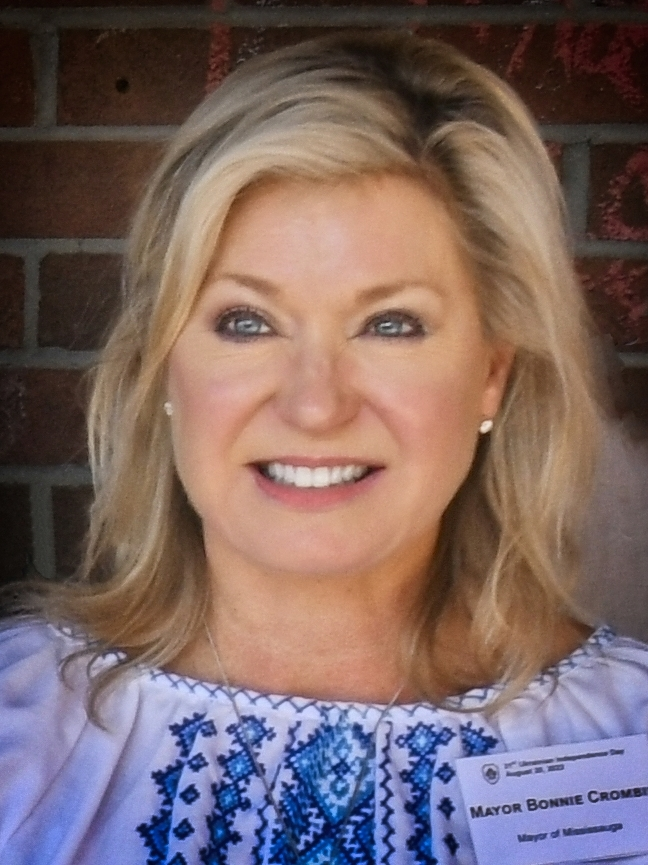

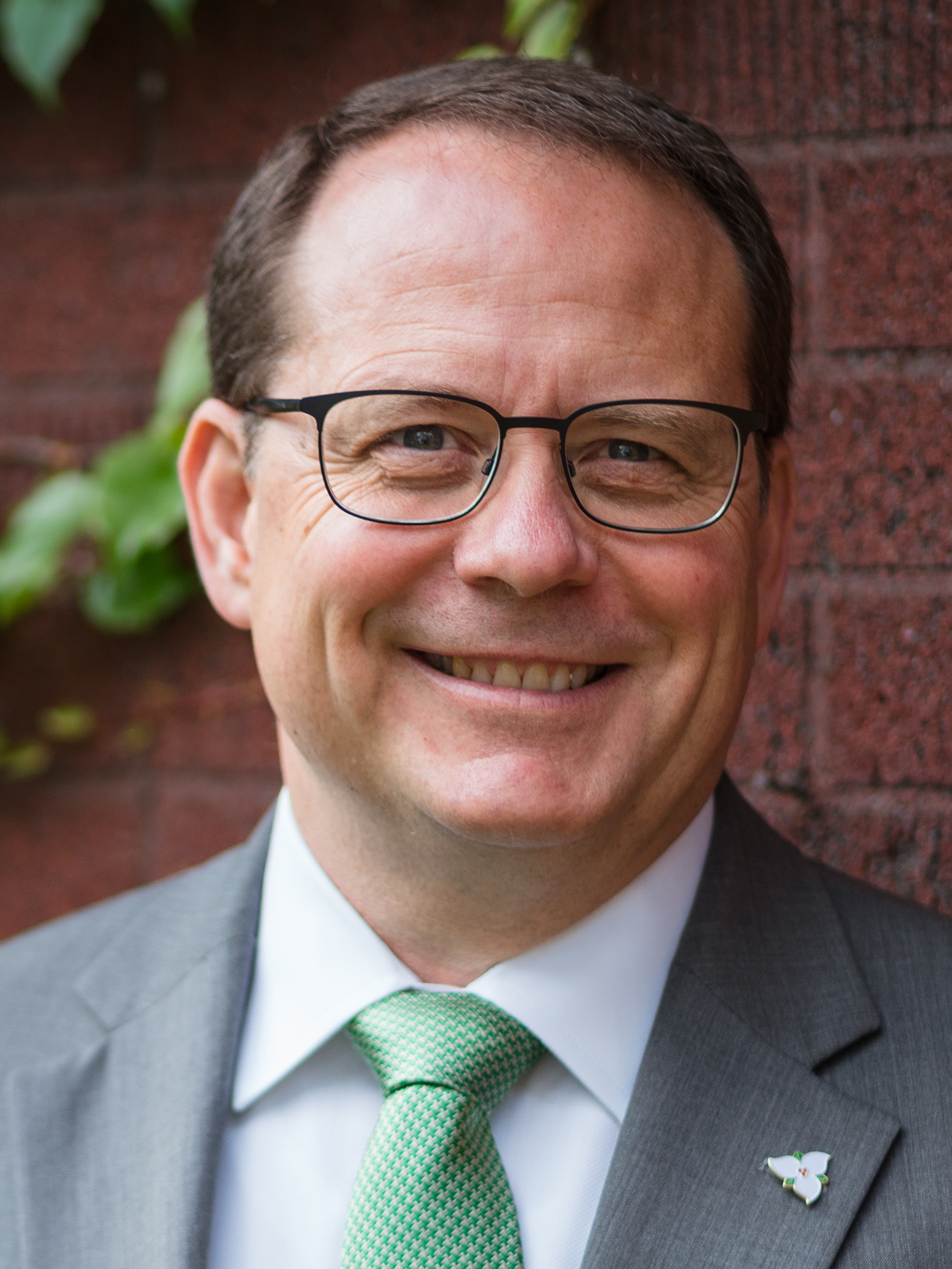
	First party	Second party
Leader	Doug Ford	Marit Stiles
Party	Progressive Conservative	New Democratic
Leader since	March 10, 2018	February 4, 2023
Leader's seat	Etobicoke North	Davenport
Last election	83 seats, 40.83%	31 seats, 23.74%
Seats before	79	28
Seats won	80	27
Seat change	▲1	▼1
Popular vote	2,158,452	931,796
Percentage	42.97%	18.55%
Swing	▲2.14pp	▼5.19pp
	Third party	Fourth party
Leader	Bonnie Crombie	Mike Schreiner
Party	Liberal	Green
Leader since	December 2, 2023	November 15, 2009
Leader's seat	Ran in Mississauga East—Cooksville (lost)	Guelph
Last election	8 seats, 23.85%	1 seat, 5.96%
Seats before	9	2
Seats won	14	2
Seat change	▲5	Steady
Popular vote	1,504,688	242,822
Percentage	29.95%	4.83%
Swing	▲6.10pp	▼1.13pp
- Popular vote by riding. As this is an FPTP election, seat totals are not determined by popular vote, but instead by the result in each riding.

- Composition of the Legislative Assembly of Ontario after the election
Premier before election
Doug Ford
Progressive Conservative
Premier after election
Doug Ford
Progressive Conservative

General elections were held on February 27, 2025, to elect the 124 members of the 44th Parliament of Ontario. After triggering a snap election in January 2025, Premier Doug Ford's Progressive Conservatives were re-elected to a third consecutive majority government, the first time a party has done so since 1959. The PCs increased their vote share to 43%, however lost three seats compared to 2022. The New Democratic Party under recently elected leader Marit Stiles retained its status as the Official Opposition. Additionally, the Ontario Liberal Party finished second in the popular vote but won only fourteen seats, remaining in third place in terms of seat count since 2018, although this five-seat increase was just barely enough for the Liberals to regain official party status in the legislature for the first time since 2018. Liberal leader Bonnie Crombie failed to win her seat in Mississauga East—Cooksville, losing to the PC candidate.

The Greens held their two seats, including leader Mike Schreiner, but suffered a slight drop in popularity. Incumbent independent MPP Bobbi Ann Brady held her seat in Haldimand-Norfolk, winning the second-largest margin in the province.

== Background ==
Under the Ontario Elections Act, general elections must be held on the first Thursday in June in the fourth calendar year following the previous general election. As the previous election was held on June 2, 2022, this election was anticipated to be held on June 4, 2026. However, it had been speculated since early 2024 that Premier Doug Ford would call a snap election to take advantage of a lead in the polls and fundraising, as well as a desire to hold the election before the next federal election, which, at that time, the federal Conservative Party under Pierre Poilievre was considered extremely likely to win. This speculation was fueled in May 2024, when Ford refused to commit to the June 2026 date when asked by reporters at multiple press conferences for confirmation.

On January 23, 2025, multiple news outlets reported that Ford would visit Edith Dumont, the Lieutenant Governor of Ontario, on January 29 to ask for the 43rd Provincial Parliament to be dissolved, triggering an election to be held on February 27. This speculation was confirmed by Ford at a press conference on January 24. On January 28, he met with Dumont; the Provincial Parliament was formally dissolved, with a writ of election issued the next day. The election cost approximately $189 million.

=== Electoral districts ===
The Electoral Boundaries Act, 2015 increased the number of electoral districts from 107 to 122, following the boundaries set out by the federal 2013 Representation Order for Ontario, while preserving the special boundaries of the 11 seats in Northern Ontario set out in the 1996 redistribution.

The Far North Electoral Boundaries Commission, appointed in 2016, recommended the creation of the additional districts of Kiiwetinoong and Mushkegowuk—James Bay, carved out from the existing Kenora—Rainy River and Timmins—James Bay ridings, which accordingly raised the total number of seats to 124. This was implemented through the Representation Statute Law Amendment Act, 2017.

With the 2022 Canadian federal electoral redistribution, Ontario was allotted 1 additional seat in the House of Commons. On August 1, 2024, Premier Ford announced that Ontario would break with recent tradition and not adopt the federal electoral boundary changes for the next provincial election. As Northern Ontario lost a seat in the federal process, further adjustments would have been needed to maintain their extra provincial representation, which would have resulted in an extra additional riding.

== Timeline ==
=== 2022 ===
- June 2: The Progressive Conservative Party of Ontario under Doug Ford won a second majority government in the 43rd Ontario general election. New Democratic Party leader Andrea Horwath and Liberal leader Steven Del Duca both announced their resignation on election night.
- June 28: Toronto—Danforth MPP Peter Tabuns was named interim leader of the NDP, becoming Leader of the Official Opposition.
- August 3: Ottawa South MPP John Fraser was named interim leader of the Liberals.

=== 2023 ===
- February 4: Marit Stiles was declared leader of the NDP, and became Leader of the Official Opposition.
- December 2: Bonnie Crombie was elected leader of the Liberals.

=== 2025 ===
- January 28: The lieutenant governor dissolves the Legislature.
- January 29: Writs of election are issued, officially starting the campaign.
- February 13: Nominations close.
- February 14: First leaders' debate, organized by Federation of Northern Ontario Municipalities.
- February 17: Second leaders' debate, organized by Broadcast Consortium.
- February 27: Election day.

=== Seat changes ===
43rd Legislative Assembly of Ontario - Movement in seats held up to the election (2022–2025)
Party	2022	Gain/(loss) due to					2025
Party	2022	Resignation as MPP	Resignation from caucus	Expulsion	Byelection gain	Byelection hold	2025
Progressive Conservative	83	(4)	(2)	(1)		3	79
New Democratic	31	(2)		(2)		1	28
Liberal	8	(1)			1	1	9
Green	1				1		2
Independent	1		2	3			6
Total	124	(7)	–	–	2	5	124

Changes in seats held since June 2, 2022
Seat	Before				Change		
Seat	Date	Member	Party	Reason	Date	Member	Party
Hamilton Centre	August 15, 2022	Andrea Horwath	█ New Democratic	Resignation from legislature. (Note: to run for Mayor of Hamilton.)	March 16, 2023	Sarah Jama	█ New Democratic
Don Valley North	March 10, 2023	Vincent Ke	█ PC	Resignation from caucus. (Note: due to allegations that he was involved in the 2019 Canadian Parliament infiltration plot.)			█ Independent
Kanata—Carleton	March 24, 2023	Merrilee Fullerton	█ PC	Resignation from legislature.	July 27, 2023	Karen McCrimmon	█ Liberal
Algoma—Manitoulin	March 31, 2023	Michael Mantha	█ New Democratic	Expelled from caucus. (Note: over workplace misconduct allegations.)			█ Independent
Scarborough—Guildwood	May 10, 2023	Mitzie Hunter	█ Liberal	Resignation from legislature. (Note: to run for Mayor of Toronto.)	July 27, 2023	Andrea Hazell	█ Liberal
Kitchener Centre	July 13, 2023	Laura Mae Lindo	█ New Democratic	Resignation from legislature. (Note: to accept position at the University of Waterloo)	November 30, 2023	Aislinn Clancy	█ Green
Mississauga East—Cooksville	September 20, 2023	Kaleed Rasheed	█ PC	Resignation from caucus. (Note: after contradictory claims were made regarding a Las Vegas business trip.)			█ Independent
Lambton—Kent—Middlesex	September 22, 2023	Monte McNaughton	█ PC	Resignation from legislature (Note: to accept position in the private sector)	May 2, 2024	Steve Pinsonneault	█ PC
Hamilton Centre	October 23, 2023	Sarah Jama	█ New Democratic	Expelled from caucus. (Note: over comments made regarding the Gaza war)			█ Independent
Milton	January 25, 2024	Parm Gill	█ PC	Resignation from legislature. (Note: to run in the next federal election)	May 2, 2024	Zee Hamid	█ PC
Carleton	June 28, 2024	Goldie Ghamari	█ PC	Expelled from caucus. (Note: after meeting with far-right activist Tommy Robinson)			█ Independent
Bay of Quinte	August 16, 2024	Todd Smith	█ PC	Resignation from legislature.	September 19, 2024	Tyler Allsopp	█ PC

=== By-election results ===
Analysis of byelections by turnout and vote share for winning candidate (vs 2022)
Riding and winning party			Turnout		Vote share for winning candidate	
Riding and winning party			%	Change (pp)	%	Change (pp)
Hamilton Centre	█ New Democratic	Hold	21.97	−15.97	54.28	−2.98
Kanata—Carleton	█ Liberal	Gain	35.14	−16.24	34.53	20.44
Scarborough—Guildwood	█ Liberal	Hold	21.84	−19.79	36.55	−9.75
Kitchener Centre	█ Green	Gain	27.28	−18.94	47.99	35.19
Lambton—Kent—Middlesex	█ Progressive Conservative	Hold	30.25	−17.08	56.85	−1.96
Milton	█ Progressive Conservative	Hold	27.72	−14.99	47.04	3.97
Bay of Quinte	█ Progressive Conservative	Hold	38.45	−7.46	38.69	−10.61

== Candidates ==
=== Incumbents not standing for re-election ===
As of the candidate nomination deadline, 12 incumbent MPPs chose not to run in the 2025 Ontario election:

Electoral district	Incumbent at dissolution	Date announced
Bruce—Grey—Owen Sound	Rick Byers	September 10, 2024
Carleton	Goldie Ghamari (Note: Previously elected as Progressive Conservative)	January 31, 2025
Eglinton—Lawrence	Robin Martin	November 1, 2024
Hamilton Mountain	Monique Taylor	September 9, 2024
Mississauga East—Cooksville	Kaleed Rasheed	October 11, 2024
Nepean	Lisa MacLeod	September 13, 2024
Ottawa Centre	Joel Harden	March 15, 2024
Parkdale—High Park	Bhutila Karpoche	September 29, 2024
Renfrew—Nipissing—Pembroke	John Yakabuski	November 20, 2024
Sault Ste. Marie	Ross Romano	December 12, 2024
Wellington—Halton Hills	Ted Arnott	October 15, 2024
York South—Weston	Michael Ford	January 24, 2025

== Campaign ==
Ford's PCs launched their campaign in Windsor, in front of the Ambassador Bridge. Stiles' NDP launched their campaign in Toronto, while Crombie's Liberals launched their campaign in Barrie. Schreiner's Greens launched their campaign with a speech in Queen's Park.

=== Contests ===
Candidate contests in the ridings
Candidates nominated	Ridings	Party											
Candidates nominated	Ridings	PC	Green	NDP	Lib	NB	Ont	Ind	Ltn	NOTA	Mod	Oth	Totals
3	1	1	1		1								3
4	5	5	5	5	5								20
5	30	30	30	30	30	24		1		1	1	3	150
6	44	44	44	44	43	40	17	9	5	4	4	10	264
7	24	24	24	24	24	24	13	18	2	4	3	8	168
8	17	17	17	17	17	17	11	9	8	4	3	16	136
9	3	3	3	3	3	3	3	4	2		1	2	27
Total	124	124	124	123	123	108	44	41	17	13	12	39	768

=== Issues ===
In January 2025, Ford began to state that he would need a "clear mandate" from voters to respond to the tariffs on Canadian imports to the United States threatened by the newly re-elected President Donald Trump. A video taken on the day of the 2024 US presidential election was later released showing Ford stating that he was "100% happy" that Trump won, until Trump threatened tariffs on Canada.

2025 Ontario election – issues and respective party platforms
Issue	PC	NDP	Liberal	Green
Education		Invest an additional $830 million a year to clear the repair backlog within 10 years while keeping up with school maintenance needs.; Create a universal School Food Program and use fresh food prepared and grown in Ontario.; End the practice of streaming.; Invest in Francophone education in French school boards and French immersion programs in the English system.; More school transportation funding.		Clearing the backlog in school repairs, supporting students with special needs, and extending OHIP to cover mental health care.
Energy and Environment	Permanently cutting the provincial tax on gas by 5.7 cents per litre and on diesel by 5.3 cents.			Working with Indigenous communities to conserve 30% of natural areas by 2030.; End reliance on fossil fuels, invest in low-cost renewables and build climate-friendly transit options.
Healthcare	Investing $1.8 billion more to connect everyone in Ontario to a family doctor and primary care.	Hiring of at least 15,000 nurses over the next three years to ensure safe staffing ratios and end the reliance on private agencies.; Expand healthcare in Northern Ontario by hiring 350 doctors, including 200 family physicians and 150 specialists.; Establish a Northern Command Centre to manage capacity across the North.; Fast-track solutions in the first 100 days—more family health teams, shorter specialist wait times, and flexible care options.; Clear the path for 13,000 internationally trained doctors and increase residency spots province-wide.	Guarantee a Family Doctor for all Ontarians by 2029.	Two new hospitals in Huntsville and Bracebridge.
Housing		Create 60,000 new supportive housing units.; Double the supply of permanently affordable homes, legalize fourplexes and increase density around transit, and provide funding for non-profit and co-op housing providers.; Reintroduce rent control, stopping unethical evictions.; Upload shelter funding to the provincial government.	Eliminating the provincial Land Transfer Tax for first-time homebuyers, seniors downsizing, and non-profit home builders.; Scrapping Development Charges on new middle-class housing, which can add up to $170,000 on the price of a new home, and replacing them with a Better Communities Fund to ensure that the province invests in and benefits from sustainable municipal growth.; Introducing fair, phased-in rent control similar to Manitoba, resolving Landlord-Tenant Board disputes within two months, and establishing the Rental Emergency Support for Tenants (REST) Fund to help vulnerable renters avoid eviction during financial emergencies.	Allowing for the construction of fourplexes and four-storey buildings as of right across the province and sixplexes in cities over 500,000, and midrise buildings of up to 6-11 storeys on transit corridors and main streets.; Removing development charges on homes, condos and apartment units under 2,000 square feet that are built within urban boundaries, and creating an Affordable Communities Fund to cover municipalities’ housing infrastructure costs.; Removing the Land Transfer Tax for first-time homebuyers.
Agriculture				Immediately increasing funding to expand business risk management programs by $150 million annually.; Prioritizing Ontario-grown food by developing local procurement guidelines for public sector purchases, and establishing a fund to increase local processing capacity.; Creating an AgTech Innovation Fund.; Introducing a provincial program to pay farmers for environmental goods and services by working with organizations such as ALUS (Alternative Land Use Services).; Establish an Ontario Foodbelt to protect farmland.
Infrastructure	Investing up to $15 billion more over three years to speed up key capital projects, including widening the QEW between Burlington and St. Catharines.; Providing another $5 billion for the Building Ontario Fund, for a total of $8 billion, to invest in housing, long-term care, energy, transportation and municipal infrastructure projects.; Increasing the Community Sport and Recreation Fund by $300 million to help build more rinks, arenas, sports centres and other community infrastructure.; $56 million to upgrade and repair Highway 174 prior to it being uploaded to the province.; $50 million to upgrade rural roads and highways outside the downtown core.			
Social assistance		Double ODSP payments.; Overhaul WSIB.; Expand workers’ health care benefits so they can receive the treatments they need, including mental health care.; Create a Monthly Grocery Rebate; Forcing large retailers to publicly post when they raise prices more than two per cent in a week.; New watchdog to enforce competition laws and keep food prices fair.	Double ODSP payments.	
Taxation			Cut the income tax rate for the middle-class.; Eliminate sales tax (HST) on home heating and hydro bills.	
Transportation	Investing more than $200 billion to build roads, highways, transit and other infrastructure projects while investing over $2.5 billion to train more than one million people for better jobs and bigger paycheques in the skilled trades.; Upload the upload Ottawa LRT system to the provincial government.; More than $50 million to design and build a new interchange at Highway 416 and Barnsdale Road.; $80 million to support the Kanata North Transitway.; Taking tolls off Highway 407 East, which runs between Brock Road in Pickering and Highway 115 in Clarington.; Legislation to ban use of congestion pricing on all provincial and municipal roadways.		Upload the Ottawa LRT system to the provincial government.	
Tariff response	$10 billion in cash-flow support for Ontario employers.; $3 billion in payroll tax and premium relief.; $120 million to support approximately 18,000 bars and restaurants.; $40 million for a new Trade-Impacted Communities Program.; $300 million to expand the Ontario Made Manufacturing Investment Tax Credit.; $600 million for the Invest Ontario Fund.	Create a Premier's Task Force on the Economy with business, labour and civil society.; Invest in retraining opportunities in post-secondary and the skilled trades.; Removing the cap from the Risk Management Program.; Promote interprovincial cooperation and break down trade barriers.; Launch a Buy Ontario campaign to promote Ontario goods.; Direct Ontario government-funded agencies to procure locally.; Negotiate a joint federal-provincial income assistance program to support people whose livelihoods are impacted by tariffs.; Support Canada's national tariff response.	Offer a bonus to nurses and doctors who return to Canada from the U.S.; Remove the hidden tax on home building and introduce phased-in rent control.; Cut the small business tax rate in half, 3.2% to 1.6%, and increase the eligible income threshold.; End the Starlink contract with the provincial government.	Immediately create a ‘tariff taskforce’ that works across party, jurisdictional and sectoral lines to defend Ontario workers, jobs and companies in trade negotiations.; Create an investment tax credit.; Create a Protect Ontario Fund for businesses disproportionately impacted by tariffs.

=== Party slogans ===
Party	English	French (translation)
█ PC	"Protect Ontario"	Unofficial: "Protéger l'Ontario"
█ New Democratic	"On Your Side"	"À vos côtés"
█ Liberal	"More For You"	"Plus Pour Vous"
█ Green	"People Before Profits"	

=== Endorsements ===
Endorsements received by each party
Type	PC	NDP	Liberal	Green
Media		Toronto Star endorsed the NDP, Liberals, and Greens, and encouraged Ontarians to vote strategically to prevent a PC majority		
Politicians and public figures	Kevin Ashe, Mayor of Pickering (2022–present); Dave Barton, Mayor of Uxbridge (2022–present); Rob Burton, Mayor of Oakville (2006–present); Patrick Brown, Mayor of Brampton (2018–present); Frank Campion, Mayor of Welland (2014–present); Dan Carter, Mayor of Oshawa (2018–present); Drew Dilkens, Mayor of Windsor (2014–present); Jim Diodati, Mayor of Niagara Falls (2010–present); Adrian Foster, Mayor of Clarington (2010–present); Bill Gordon, Mayor of Midland (2022–present); Tim Houston, Premier of Nova Scotia (2021–present); Gordon Krantz, Mayor of Milton (1980–present); James Leduc, Mayor of Bradford West Gwillimbury (2022–present); Don McIsaac, Mayor of Orillia (2022–present); Peter McCallion, son of Hazel McCallion, former candidate for mayor of Mississauga (2023); Alex Nuttall, Mayor of Barrie (2022–present); Mat Siscoe, Mayor of St. Catharines (2022–present)	Jim Dinn, Leader of the Newfoundland and Labrador New Democratic Party (2023–present); Peter Julian, Member of Parliament for New Westminster—Burnaby (2004–present); Jean Yoon, actress	Mark Carney, Governor of the Bank of Canada (2008–2013), candidate for leader of the Liberal Party of Canada (2025); Chrystia Freeland, Deputy Prime Minister of Canada (2019–2024), Member of Parliament for University—Rosedale (2013–present), candidate for leader of the Liberal Party of Canada (2025); Marc Serre, Member of Parliament for Nickel Belt (2015–present); Viviane Lapointe, Member of Parliament for Sudbury (2021–present)	
Unions and business associations	Brick and Allied Craft Union of Canada; Carpenters' Regional Council; Grain Farmers of Ontario; Greater Toronto Sewer & Watermain Contractors Association (GTSWCA); International Brotherhood of Boilermakers (IBB); International Brotherhood of Electrical Workers Construction Council of Ontario (IBEW CCO); International Association of Heat and Frost Insulators and Allied Workers; International Union of Operating Engineers Local 793 (IUOE); International Union of Painters and Allied Trades, DC46; Laborers' International Union of North America (LiUNA); Ontario General Contractors Association (OGCA); Ontario Pipe Trades Council (OPTC); Ontario Professional Firefighters Association (OPFFA); Ontario Provincial Police Association (OPPA); Ontario Road Builders' Association (ORBA); Ontario Sheet Metal Workers' & Roofers' Conference (OSMWRC); Operative Plasterers' and Cement Masons' International Association Local 598 (OPCMIA); Police Association of Ontario (PAO); Residential and Civil Construction Alliance of Ontario (RCCAO); Toronto Police Association (TPA); United Association Local 787, HVACR Workers of Ontario; Unifor Local 1285; Unifor Local 29-X; Unifor Local 47; Unite Here! Local 75	Association of Community Organizations for Reform Now Ontario (ACORN); Amalgamated Transit Union Canada (ATU); Brantford and District Labour Council (BDLC); Canadian Labour Congress (CLC); Canadian Office and Professional Employees Union (COPE); Canadian Union of Public Employees Ontario (CUPE); International Association of Machinists and Aerospace Workers (IAMAW); London and District Labour Council (LDLC); Niagara Regional Labour Council (NRLC); Ontario Federation of Labour (OFL); Ontario Secondary School Teachers' Federation (OSSTF); Ontario Nurses' Association (ONA); Ontario Public Service Employees Union (OPSEU); Sarnia and District Labour Council (SDLC); Sudbury and District Labour Council (SDLC); United Steelworkers; ETFO Thames Valley Teacher Local (TVOT); Thunder Bay and District Labour Council (TBDLC); Toronto Elementary Catholic Teachers (TECT); Windsor and District Labour Council (WDLC)		

=== Debates ===
Date	Time (EST)	Organiser(s)	Moderator	Location	Language	Participants			
Date	Time (EST)	Organiser(s)	Moderator	Location	Language	PC	NDP	Lib.	Green
February 14, 2025	1:00 p.m.	Federation of Northern Ontario Municipalities	Markus Schwabe	North Bay	English	Present; Ford	Present; Stiles	Present; Crombie	Present; Schreiner
February 17, 2025	6:30 p.m.	Broadcast Consortium	David Common	Toronto	English	Present; Ford	Present; Stiles	Present; Crombie	Present; Schreiner
February 19, 2025	8:00 p.m.	TFO and Radio-Canada	Sandra Padovani and Sébastien St-François	Ottawa	French	Present; Mulroney	Present; Gélinas	Present; Collard	Present; Petersen

== Results ==
Choropleth map of results

Cartogram view of results

Elections to the 44th Parliament of Ontario (2025)
Party	Leader	Candidates	Votes				Seats		
Party	Leader	Candidates	#	±	%	Change (pp)	2022	2025	±
Progressive Conservative	Doug Ford	124	2,159,060	239,155▲	42.99	2.16	83	80 / 124	3▼
Liberal	Bonnie Crombie	123	1,505,093	381,028▲	29.97	6.06	8	14 / 124	6▲
New Democratic	Marit Stiles	123	931,016	185,367▼	18.54	-5.20	31	27 / 124	4▼
Green	Mike Schreiner	124	242,320	37,686▼	4.83	-1.13	1	2 / 124	1▲
New Blue	Jim Karahalios	108	80,033	47,429▼	1.59	-1.12			
Independent		41	53,926	28,594▲	1.07	0.53	1	1 / 124	Steady
Ontario Party	Derek Sloan	44	26,007	57,611 ▼	0.52	-1.26			
Libertarian	Mark Snow	17	7,672	2,430▲	0.15	0.04			
None of the Above	Greg Vezina	13	4,724	1,478▼	0.09	-0.04			
Communist	Drew Garvie	7	2,294	194▲	0.05	0.01			
Moderate	Yuri Duboisky	12	1,857	239▲	0.04	0.01			
Centrist	Mansoor Qureshi	5	1,601	1,306▲	0.03	0.02			
Freedom	Paul McKeever	5	1,376	727▼	0.03	-0.01			
Stop the New Sex-Ed Agenda	John Kanary	2	1,353	1,013▲	0.03	0.02			
Populist	Jim Torma	4	709	1,929▼	0.01	-0.05			
Northern Ontario	Jacques Ouellette	3	656	373▲	0.01	–			
Ontario Alliance	Joshua E. Eriksen	5	623	515▲	0.01	0.01			
Progress Party Ontario	Sana Ahmad	2	602	602▲	0.01	New			
Canadians' Choice Party	Bahman Yazdanfar	2	586	18▲	0.01	–			
Special Needs	Lionel Wayne Poizner	2	392	102▲	0.01	–			
Electoral Reform Party	Peter House	2	242	60▲	–	–			
Total		768	5,022,142		100.00%				
Rejected ballots			34,791	4,274▲					
Turnout			5,056,933	324,457▲	45.22%	1.16▲			
Registered electors			11,183,586	443,160▲					

=== Vote and seat summaries ===
Ternary plots of election results
2022

2025
Electoral districts won identified by PC (blue), Liberal (red), NDP (orange), Green (green) and Independent (grey).

=== Synopsis of results ===
Results by riding - 2025 Ontario general election
Riding (Note: In order given by Elections Ontario)	Winning party								Votes (Note: In order of total votes received. Minor political parties receiving less than 1% of the popular vote and with no candidate winning at least 1,000 votes are aggregated under "Other"; independent candidates are aggregated separately.)									
Riding	2022	1st place	Votes	Share	Margin #	Margin %	2nd place	3rd place	PC	Lib	NDP	Green	NB	Ont	SNSA	Ind	Other	Total
Ajax	PC	Lib	18,499	44.96%	331	0.80%	PC	NDP	18,168	18,499	2,884	866	413	–	–	–	312	41,142
Algoma—Manitoulin	NDP	PC	11,263	41.33%	3,854	14.14%	NDP	Lib	11,263	3,948	7,409	677	718	–	–	3,238	–	27,253
Aurora—Oak Ridges—Richmond Hill	PC	PC	19,670	57.19%	8,025	23.33%	Lib	NDP	19,670	11,645	1,929	610	540	–	–	–	–	34,394
Barrie—Innisfil	PC	PC	22,048	54.11%	11,435	28.06%	Lib	NDP	22,048	10,613	5,442	1,655	814	–	–	–	174	40,746
Barrie—Springwater—Oro-Medonte	PC	PC	20,073	49.88%	5,741	14.27%	Lib	NDP	20,073	14,332	2,710	1,637	856	–	–	–	637	40,245
Bay of Quinte	PC	PC	20,606	44.14%	5,954	12.75%	Lib	NDP	20,606	14,652	8,793	1,618	518	501	–	–	–	46,688
Beaches—East York	Lib	Lib	21,545	51.17%	11,885	28.23%	NDP	PC	9,001	21,545	9,660	1,298	246	125	–	122	107	42,104
Brampton Centre	PC	PC	12,776	51.85%	4,419	17.94%	Lib	NDP	12,776	8,357	2,161	910	434	–	–	–	–	24,638
Brampton East	PC	PC	14,759	51.77%	6,248	21.92%	Lib	NDP	14,759	8,511	3,104	757	–	–	–	1,376	–	28,507
Brampton North	PC	PC	17,597	57.52%	8,327	27.22%	Lib	NDP	17,597	9,270	2,479	746	499	–	–	–	–	30,591
Brampton South	PC	PC	15,379	52.53%	5,849	19.98%	Lib	NDP	15,379	9,530	2,413	911	1,042	–	–	–	–	29,275
Brampton West	PC	PC	19,028	56.58%	8,095	24.07%	Lib	NDP	19,028	10,933	1,981	877	554	–	–	260	–	33,633
Brantford—Brant	PC	PC	24,169	47.23%	12,164	23.77%	NDP	Lib	24,169	10,364	12,005	2,597	1,138	–	–	–	899	51,172
Bruce—Grey—Owen Sound	PC	PC	20,158	44.14%	6,713	14.70%	Lib	Green	20,158	13,445	3,611	5,693	930	–	1,006	–	829	45,672
Burlington	PC	PC	24,118	43.14%	39	0.07%	Lib	NDP	24,118	24,079	4,487	1,913	727	–	–	–	582	55,906
Cambridge	PC	PC	19,210	43.66%	4,079	9.27%	Lib	NDP	19,210	15,131	5,074	2,519	2,067	–	–	–	–	44,001
Carleton	PC	PC	26,158	49.61%	5,823	11.04%	Lib	NDP	26,158	20,335	3,763	956	699	346	–	202	263	52,722
Chatham-Kent—Leamington	PC	PC	22,255	52.03%	14,399	33.66%	Lib	NDP	22,255	7,856	7,333	1,241	3,387	704	–	–	–	42,776
Davenport	NDP	NDP	22,143	57.07%	14,160	36.49%	Lib	PC	6,937	7,983	22,143	1,184	–	–	–	–	556	38,803
Don Valley East	Lib	Lib	15,465	56.65%	6,681	24.47%	PC	NDP	8,784	15,465	2,094	778	–	–	–	–	180	27,301
Don Valley North	PC	Lib	13,375	43.77%	1,891	6.19%	PC	Ind	11,484	13,375	1,562	784	346	–	–	3,005	–	30,556
Don Valley West	Lib	Lib	18,350	57.21%	7,480	23.32%	PC	NDP	10,870	18,350	1,268	1,052	287	–	–	247	–	32,074
Dufferin—Caledon	PC	PC	26,072	52.49%	13,466	27.11%	Lib	Green	26,072	12,606	3,184	6,157	1,074	–	–	384	197	49,674
Durham	PC	PC	26,967	50.48%	11,266	21.09%	Lib	NDP	26,967	15,701	7,635	1,280	666	409	–	130	635	53,423
Eglinton—Lawrence	PC	PC	19,556	48.48%	167	0.41%	Lib	Green	19,556	19,389	–	1,390	–	–	–	–	–	40,335
Elgin—Middlesex—London	PC	PC	28,720	55.78%	16,122	31.31%	Lib	NDP	28,720	12,598	4,738	2,933	1,418	610	–	–	469	51,486
Essex	PC	PC	30,790	55.61%	18,743	33.85%	NDP	Lib	30,790	8,707	12,047	1,282	940	931	–	200	469	55,366
Etobicoke Centre	PC	PC	22,261	48.10%	2,903	6.27%	Lib	NDP	22,261	19,358	2,151	1,000	658	–	–	–	851	46,279
Etobicoke—Lakeshore	PC	Lib	25,195	48.52%	4,145	7.98%	PC	NDP	21,050	25,195	3,640	1,218	452	–	–	–	369	51,924
Etobicoke North	PC	PC	15,426	59.40%	8,057	31.02%	Lib	NDP	15,426	7,369	2,067	526	177	405	–	–	–	25,970
Flamborough—Glanbrook	PC	PC	23,790	49.38%	8,655	17.97%	Lib	NDP	23,790	15,135	6,095	1,923	1,233	–	–	–	–	48,176
Glengarry—Prescott—Russell	PC	PC	24,618	51.36%	6,866	14.32%	Lib	NDP	24,618	17,752	2,384	1,089	971	800	–	321	–	47,935
Guelph	Green	Green	34,238	56.94%	19,852	33.01%	PC	Lib	14,386	6,874	3,497	34,238	1,137	–	–	–	–	60,132
Haldimand—Norfolk	Ind	Ind	33,669	63.65%	20,720	39.17%	PC	Lib	12,949	2,918	2,147	821	392	–	–	33,669	–	52,896
Haliburton—Kawartha Lakes—Brock	PC	PC	26,446	52.03%	14,770	29.06%	Lib	NDP	26,446	11,676	6,980	2,593	1,221	969	–	287	659	50,831
Hamilton Centre	NDP	NDP	12,839	38.36%	5,707	17.05%	Lib	PC	6,331	7,132	12,839	1,642	441	–	–	5,084 (Note: The incumbent Sarah Jama was ousted as the NDP candidate. She ran as an independent, receiving 4,977 votes and coming in at 4th place.)	–	33,469
Hamilton East—Stoney Creek	PC	PC	16,401	42.07%	4,078	10.46%	Lib	NDP	16,401	12,323	6,862	2,049	530	595	–	–	223	38,983
Hamilton Mountain	NDP	PC	13,948	36.16%	2,015	5.22%	Lib	NDP	13,948	11,933	10,037	1,544	392	178	–	267	278	38,577
Hamilton West—Ancaster—Dundas	NDP	NDP	19,684	38.87%	2,918	5.76%	PC	Lib	16,766	11,543	19,684	1,747	587	–	–	–	310	50,637
Hastings—Lennox and Addington	PC	PC	20,249	48.58%	7,851	18.84%	Lib	NDP	20,249	12,398	4,810	1,376	528	2,318	–	–	–	41,679
Humber River—Black Creek	NDP	NDP	8,788	35.33%	193	0.78%	PC	Lib	8,595	6,811	8,788	402	–	–	–	–	280	24,876
Huron—Bruce	PC	PC	24,461	50.02%	10,758	22.00%	Lib	NDP	24,461	13,703	5,739	2,727	2,065	–	–	–	206	48,901
Kanata—Carleton	PC	Lib	22,811	47.91%	3,458	7.26%	PC	NDP	19,353	22,811	3,419	1,199	503	323	–	–	–	47,608
Kenora—Rainy River	PC	PC	10,541	59.93%	7,233	41.12%	NDP	Lib	10,541	3,072	3,308	336	333	–	–	–	–	17,590
King—Vaughan	PC	PC	28,527	64.17%	16,074	36.16%	Lib	NDP	28,527	12,453	1,714	934	569	256	–	–	–	44,453
Kingston and the Islands	Lib	Lib	33,288	61.57%	21,266	39.33%	PC	NDP	12,022	33,288	6,663	1,195	–	565	–	–	331	54,064
Kitchener Centre	NDP	Green	21,200	51.39%	11,209	27.17%	PC	Lib	9,991	5,892	2,821	21,200	804	398	–	144	–	41,250
Kitchener—Conestoga	PC	PC	16,946	41.54%	4,915	12.05%	Lib	NDP	16,946	12,031	7,551	2,227	1,152	890	–	–	–	40,797
Kitchener South—Hespeler	PC	PC	17,363	45.42%	7,533	19.71%	Lib	NDP	17,363	9,830	6,841	3,345	846	–	–	–	–	38,225
Lambton—Kent—Middlesex	PC	PC	25,297	53.55%	12,900	27.31%	Lib	NDP	25,297	12,397	5,775	1,677	2,093	–	–	–	–	47,239
Lanark—Frontenac—Kingston	PC	PC	23,396	49.10%	7,769	16.30%	Lib	NDP	23,396	15,627	5,030	1,595	695	982	–	328	–	47,653
Leeds—Grenville—Thousand Islands and Rideau Lakes	PC	PC	25,118	55.12%	12,726	27.93%	Lib	NDP	25,118	12,392	4,489	1,926	743	561	–	–	342	45,571
London—Fanshawe	NDP	NDP	18,749	47.59%	5,269	13.37%	PC	Lib	13,480	4,884	18,749	1,045	654	–	–	205	381	39,398
London North Centre	NDP	NDP	22,587	46.71%	6,804	14.07%	PC	Lib	15,783	7,557	22,587	1,605	512	–	–	–	312	48,356
London West	NDP	NDP	26,589	49.21%	7,697	14.24%	PC	Lib	18,892	5,991	26,589	1,021	636	–	–	153	751	54,033
Markham—Stouffville	PC	PC	22,757	50.64%	4,133	9.20%	Lib	NDP	22,757	18,624	2,051	1,018	491	–	–	–	–	44,941
Markham—Thornhill	PC	PC	14,287	53.58%	3,707	13.90%	Lib	NDP	14,287	10,580	1,176	623	–	–	–	–	–	26,666
Markham—Unionville	PC	PC	20,113	61.16%	9,955	30.27%	Lib	NDP	20,113	10,158	1,298	772	545	–	–	–	–	32,886
Milton	PC	PC	20,091	47.43%	2,540	6.00%	Lib	NDP	20,091	17,551	2,403	1,130	866	–	–	–	316	42,357
Mississauga Centre	PC	PC	16,592	46.79%	2,031	5.73%	Lib	NDP	16,592	14,561	2,310	1,028	443	–	–	195	334	35,463
Mississauga East—Cooksville	PC	PC	16,764	46.43%	1,210	3.35%	Lib	NDP	16,764	15,554	1,879	744	429	192	–	428	118	36,108
Mississauga—Erin Mills	PC	PC	16,694	44.26%	23	0.06%	Lib	NDP	16,694	16,671	2,090	1,080	751	–	–	431	–	37,717
Mississauga—Lakeshore	PC	PC	20,586	47.54%	1,671	3.86%	Lib	NDP	20,586	18,915	1,974	1,041	549	–	–	123	113	43,301
Mississauga—Malton	PC	PC	15,117	50.94%	3,618	12.19%	Lib	NDP	15,117	11,499	2,000	561	498	–	–	–	–	29,675
Mississauga—Streetsville	PC	PC	19,118	47.71%	1,821	4.54%	Lib	NDP	19,118	17,297	2,012	1,012	630	–	–	–	–	40,069
Nepean	PC	Lib	22,683	48.53%	4,721	10.10%	PC	NDP	17,962	22,683	4,116	885	485	385	–	223	–	46,739
Newmarket—Aurora	PC	PC	20,260	47.56%	2,537	5.96%	Lib	NDP	20,260	17,723	2,709	1,088	536	–	–	–	286	42,602
Niagara Centre	NDP	NDP	20,408	42.18%	2,335	4.83%	PC	Lib	18,073	7,143	20,408	1,261	857	513	–	–	130	48,385
Niagara Falls	NDP	NDP	29,549	54.95%	10,980	20.42%	PC	Lib	18,569	3,398	29,549	837	870	285	–	263	–	53,771
Niagara West	PC	PC	22,916	51.13%	11,825	26.39%	Lib	NDP	22,916	11,091	7,312	1,794	676	629	–	–	399	44,817
Nickel Belt	NDP	NDP	17,123	48.37%	4,494	12.69%	PC	Lib	12,629	3,874	17,123	631	676	–	–	–	470	35,403
Nipissing	PC	PC	17,356	54.83%	9,376	29.62%	NDP	Lib	17,356	3,996	7,980	1,292	–	496	–	–	536	31,656
Northumberland—Peterborough South	PC	PC	28,502	52.11%	10,797	19.74%	Lib	NDP	28,502	17,705	5,097	1,998	717	673	–	–	–	54,692
Oakville	PC	PC	22,754	48.01%	1,848	3.90%	Lib	NDP	22,754	20,906	1,851	1,235	556	–	–	–	93	47,395
Oakville North—Burlington	PC	PC	25,580	49.70%	4,527	8.80%	Lib	NDP	25,580	21,053	2,769	1,411	659	–	–	–	–	51,472
Orléans	Lib	Lib	30,482	54.18%	10,614	18.87%	PC	NDP	19,868	30,482	3,378	1,398	636	–	–	267	233	56,262
Oshawa	NDP	NDP	20,367	45.87%	1,925	4.34%	PC	Lib	18,442	3,891	20,367	916	644	–	–	142	–	44,402
Ottawa Centre	NDP	NDP	32,483	55.70%	18,892	32.39%	Lib	PC	9,573	13,591	32,483	1,550	468	321	–	102	232	58,320
Ottawa South	Lib	Lib	22,326	53.24%	12,011	28.64%	PC	NDP	10,315	22,326	7,447	1,206	638	–	–	–	–	41,932
Ottawa—Vanier	Lib	Lib	20,721	51.45%	11,636	28.89%	PC	NDP	9,085	20,721	7,350	2,083	511	–	–	–	525	40,275
Ottawa West—Nepean	NDP	NDP	20,087	49.33%	8,390	20.60%	PC	Lib	11,697	7,229	20,087	976	733	–	–	–	–	40,722
Oxford	PC	PC	27,061	55.26%	15,713	32.09%	Lib	NDP	27,061	11,348	5,374	2,182	1,317	1,414	–	–	274	48,970
Parkdale—High Park	NDP	NDP	20,508	45.35%	6,567	14.52%	Lib	PC	8,058	13,941	20,508	1,968	462	–	–	–	283	45,220
Parry Sound—Muskoka	PC	PC	21,731	46.80%	2,371	5.11%	Green	Lib	21,731	2,828	1,329	19,360	785	403	–	–	–	46,436
Perth—Wellington	PC	PC	21,285	47.40%	8,766	19.52%	Lib	NDP	21,285	12,519	5,666	3,381	1,354	475	–	–	229	44,909
Peterborough—Kawartha	PC	PC	22,417	40.68%	2,200	3.99%	Lib	NDP	22,417	20,217	9,290	1,745	859	581	–	–	–	55,109
Pickering—Uxbridge	PC	PC	21,975	48.06%	3,903	8.54%	Lib	NDP	21,975	18,072	3,381	1,300	411	384	–	–	200	45,723
Renfrew—Nipissing—Pembroke	PC	PC	24,297	54.83%	14,493	32.71%	Lib	NDP	24,297	9,804	6,607	1,123	893	1,587	–	–	–	44,311
Richmond Hill	PC	PC	17,061	55.43%	6,515	21.17%	Lib	NDP	17,061	10,546	1,771	883	519	–	–	–	–	30,780
St. Catharines	NDP	NDP	19,688	42.12%	3,266	6.99%	PC	Lib	16,422	8,092	19,688	1,033	807	300	347	–	56	46,745
Sarnia—Lambton	PC	PC	22,726	51.32%	14,010	31.64%	NDP	Lib	22,726	8,134	8,716	840	1,876	359	–	890	742	44,283
Sault Ste. Marie	PC	PC	13,071	43.07%	114	0.38%	NDP	Lib	13,071	3,036	12,957	421	564	301	–	–	–	30,350
Scarborough—Agincourt	PC	PC	13,468	49.39%	2,038	7.47%	Lib	NDP	13,468	11,430	1,368	556	249	200	–	–	–	27,271
Scarborough Centre	PC	PC	13,363	44.05%	524	1.73%	Lib	NDP	13,363	12,839	2,628	918	379	–	–	–	211	30,338
Scarborough—Guildwood	Lib	Lib	13,813	51.02%	3,589	13.26%	PC	NDP	10,224	13,813	1,811	661	298	–	–	267	–	27,074
Scarborough North	PC	PC	13,031	52.98%	4,483	18.23%	Lib	NDP	13,031	8,548	2,554	465	–	–	–	–	–	24,598
Scarborough—Rouge Park	PC	PC	16,357	49.17%	2,972	8.93%	Lib	NDP	16,357	13,385	2,360	727	–	–	–	–	440	33,269
Scarborough Southwest	NDP	NDP	14,557	42.89%	4,157	12.25%	PC	Lib	10,400	7,786	14,557	1,194	–	–	–	–	–	33,937
Simcoe—Grey	PC	PC	30,572	53.59%	12,065	21.15%	Lib	NDP	30,572	18,507	3,264	3,154	1,554	–	–	–	–	57,051
Simcoe North	PC	PC	24,849	51.38%	11,521	23.82%	Lib	NDP	24,849	13,328	4,813	3,214	1,582	–	–	–	579	48,365
Spadina—Fort York	NDP	NDP	20,441	45.00%	6,110	13.45%	Lib	PC	9,139	14,331	20,441	1,220	–	–	–	–	293	45,424
Stormont—Dundas—South Glengarry	PC	PC	23,221	61.57%	15,967	42.34%	Lib	NDP	23,221	7,254	4,726	980	818	715	–	–	–	37,714
Sudbury	NDP	NDP	14,760	46.74%	2,566	8.13%	PC	Lib	12,194	3,352	14,760	748	421	–	–	106	–	31,581
Thornhill	PC	PC	22,829	63.99%	12,724	35.66%	Lib	NDP	22,829	10,105	1,282	768	523	–	–	–	170	35,677
Thunder Bay—Atikokan	PC	PC	13,727	45.71%	5,961	19.85%	NDP	Lib	13,727	7,398	7,766	457	497	–	–	–	184	30,029
Thunder Bay—Superior North	NDP	NDP	11,137	40.57%	1,789	6.52%	PC	Lib	9,348	5,846	11,137	437	265	–	–	82	336	27,451
Timiskaming—Cochrane	NDP	NDP	11,085	43.96%	1,536	6.09%	PC	Lib	9,549	2,446	11,085	1,359	777	–	–	–	–	25,216
Timmins	PC	PC	9,371	68.41%	6,639	48.47%	NDP	Lib	9,371	1,127	2,732	248	220	–	–	–	–	13,698
Toronto Centre	NDP	NDP	17,415	44.50%	3,263	8.34%	Lib	PC	5,692	14,152	17,415	1,054	290	–	–	151	381	39,135
Toronto—Danforth	NDP	NDP	25,607	60.40%	16,610	39.18%	Lib	PC	6,172	8,997	25,607	1,199	424	–	–	–	–	42,399
Toronto—St. Paul's	NDP	Lib	17,451	40.87%	3,898	9.13%	NDP	PC	10,822	17,451	13,553	873	–	–	–	–	–	42,699
University—Rosedale	NDP	NDP	17,912	45.50%	5,814	14.77%	Lib	PC	7,829	12,098	17,912	1,227	299	–	–	–	–	39,365
Vaughan—Woodbridge	PC	PC	23,243	65.13%	13,761	38.56%	Lib	NDP	23,243	9,482	1,479	628	509	–	–	–	345	35,686
Waterloo	NDP	NDP	25,055	50.23%	11,385	22.82%	PC	Lib	13,670	7,839	25,055	1,814	543	477	–	–	486	49,884
Wellington—Halton Hills	PC	PC	24,637	45.65%	9,763	18.09%	Lib	Green	24,637	14,874	3,980	8,464	1,417	398	–	199	–	53,969
Whitby	PC	PC	24,803	48.11%	4,363	8.46%	Lib	NDP	24,803	20,440	4,097	1,376	844	–	–	–	–	51,560
Willowdale	PC	PC	14,476	46.29%	605	1.93%	Lib	NDP	14,476	13,871	1,705	778	–	–	–	222	221	31,273
Windsor—Tecumseh	PC	PC	21,285	48.15%	7,564	17.11%	NDP	Lib	21,285	6,337	13,721	830	707	717	–	–	606	44,203
Windsor West	NDP	NDP	19,392	52.12%	4,727	12.70%	PC	Ont	14,665	–	19,392	868	523	1,019	–	–	740	37,207
York Centre	PC	PC	16,416	54.06%	5,593	18.42%	Lib	NDP	16,416	10,823	1,700	658	309	–	–	–	463	30,369
York—Simcoe	PC	PC	24,705	59.40%	14,764	35.50%	Lib	NDP	24,705	9,941	3,206	2,006	841	317	–	–	572	41,588
York South—Weston	PC	PC	11,142	35.22%	202	0.64%	Lib	NDP	11,142	10,940	8,101	844	396	–	–	213	–	31,636
Kiiwetinoong	NDP	NDP	3,512	62.19%	2,074	36.73%	PC	Lib	1,438	409	3,512	152	–	–	–	–	136	5,647
Mushkegowuk—James Bay	NDP	NDP	3,626	45.44%	9	0.11%	PC	Lib	3,617	621	3,626	116	–	–	–	–	–	7,980

= open seat
= winning candidate was in previous Legislature
= incumbent had switched allegiance
= not incumbent; was previously elected to the Legislature
= incumbency arose from byelection gain
= previously incumbent in another riding
= other incumbents renominated
= previously an MP in the House of Commons of Canada
= multiple candidates

=== Turnout, winning shares and swings ===
Summary of riding results by turnout, vote share for winning candidate, and swing (vs 2022)
Riding and winning party			Turnout		Vote share (Note: Share won by winning candidate, with difference noted from share achieved by the same party in 2022.)		Swing (Note: Positive indicates improvement to standing of party winning in 2022; negative points to 2022's second-place party being swung to.)	
Riding and winning party			%	Change (pp)	%	Change (pp)	To	Change (pp)
Ajax	Lib	Gain	41.56	1.60	44.96	8.98	Lib	-2.76
Algoma—Manitoulin	PC	Gain	48.93	6.46	41.33	5.85	PC	-12.30
Aurora—Oak Ridges—Richmond Hill	PC	Hold	38.30	0.11	57.19	3.93	PC	0.39
Barrie—Innisfil	PC	Hold	41.30	1.68	54.11	3.87	PC	4.82
Barrie—Springwater—Oro-Medonte	PC	Hold	45.90	-0.84	49.88	7.77	PC	6.76
Bay of Quinte	PC	Hold	48.25	2.34	44.14	-5.17	NDP	-1.54
Beaches—East York	Lib	Hold	49.97	0.39	51.17	15.75	Lib	13.01
Brampton Centre	PC	Hold	36.71	0.04	51.85	10.49	PC	14.19
Brampton East	PC	Hold	34.81	-1.54	51.77	7.45	PC	13.81
Brampton North	PC	Hold	38.48	0.02	57.52	12.53	PC	5.50
Brampton South	PC	Hold	36.10	0.30	52.53	7.15	PC	1.21
Brampton West	PC	Hold	34.77	0.58	56.58	8.74	PC	1.23
Brantford—Brant	PC	Hold	43.41	1.35	47.23	3.06	PC	3.95
Bruce—Grey—Owen Sound	PC	Hold	49.97	2.95	44.14	-4.42	Lib	-6.77
Burlington	PC	Hold	53.59	1.96	43.14	0.59	Lib	-6.53
Cambridge	PC	Hold	45.82	2.60	43.66	6.63	PC	8.65
Carleton	PC	Hold	47.10	-1.69	49.61	1.47	Lib	-5.11
Chatham-Kent—Leamington	PC	Hold	48.33	3.46	52.03	4.50	PC	8.82
Davenport	NDP	Hold	46.18	2.87	57.07	0.00	Lib	-0.68
Don Valley East	Lib	Hold	40.08	-2.29	56.65	12.79	Lib	6.40
Don Valley North	Lib	Gain	38.04	-2.72	43.77	6.94	Lib	-8.38
Don Valley West	Lib	Hold	42.43	-6.93	57.21	13.20	Lib	8.98
Dufferin—Caledon	PC	Hold	42.79	0.72	52.49	2.82	Lib	-1.87
Durham	PC	Hold	44.09	0.38	50.48	4.63	PC	0.06
Eglinton—Lawrence	PC	Hold	46.73	0.00	48.48	6.19	Lib	-0.46
Elgin—Middlesex—London	PC	Hold	49.32	4.54	55.78	4.70	PC	6.85
Essex	PC	Hold	50.34	3.13	55.61	4.51	PC	5.52
Etobicoke Centre	PC	Hold	48.11	-0.43	48.10	-0.49	Lib	-4.13
Etobicoke—Lakeshore	Lib	Gain	46.75	1.47	48.52	12.80	Lib	-4.87
Etobicoke North	PC	Hold	34.12	0.14	59.40	3.89	Lib	-0.52
Flamborough—Glanbrook	PC	Hold	47.96	1.05	49.38	3.18	PC	6.63
Glengarry—Prescott—Russell	PC	Hold	47.38	1.82	51.36	9.31	PC	5.89
Guelph	Green	Hold	51.12	1.73	56.94	2.49	PC	-0.52
Haldimand—Norfolk	Ind	Hold	54.19	5.31	63.65	28.60	Ind	17.31
Haliburton—Kawartha Lakes—Brock	PC	Hold	48.18	0.05	52.03	-0.28	PC	0.85
Hamilton Centre	NDP	Hold	42.29	4.36	38.36	-18.90	PC	-10.67
Hamilton East—Stoney Creek	PC	Hold	43.82	2.87	42.07	7.48	PC	8.61
Hamilton Mountain	PC	Gain	46.02	4.54	36.16	6.15	PC	-12.47
Hamilton West—Ancaster—Dundas	NDP	Hold	52.47	4.02	38.87	-1.55	PC	-0.83
Hastings—Lennox and Addington	PC	Hold	49.00	1.88	48.58	1.03	PC	4.25
Humber River—Black Creek	NDP	Hold	34.65	1.50	35.33	0.84	NDP	2.06
Huron—Bruce	PC	Hold	54.86	0.70	50.02	-1.95	Lib	-5.63
Kanata—Carleton	Lib	Gain	50.40	-0.98	47.91	24.49	PC	7.05
Kenora—Rainy River	PC	Hold	47.18	6.97	59.93	0.35	PC	0.73
King—Vaughan	PC	Hold	39.89	0.09	64.17	6.86	PC	3.68
Kingston and the Islands	Lib	Hold	49.74	2.90	61.57	23.91	Lib	21.37
Kitchener Centre	Green	Gain	46.97	0.75	51.39	38.59	PC	-15.65
Kitchener—Conestoga	PC	Hold	51.06	2.18	41.54	1.51	PC	5.94
Kitchener South—Hespeler	PC	Hold	43.96	1.80	45.42	5.51	PC	7.02
Lambton—Kent—Middlesex	PC	Hold	51.03	3.75	53.55	-5.25	PC	0.68
Lanark—Frontenac—Kingston	PC	Hold	51.33	1.31	49.10	-1.02	PC	4.56
Leeds—Grenville—Thousand Islands and Rideau Lakes	PC	Hold	51.25	2.07	55.12	-2.57	Lib	-5.82
London—Fanshawe	NDP	Hold	41.27	4.71	47.59	0.53	PC	-0.46
London North Centre	NDP	Hold	46.48	4.35	46.71	7.06	NDP	2.36
London West	NDP	Hold	49.97	1.35	49.21	4.08	NDP	1.49
Markham—Stouffville	PC	Hold	43.39	-1.12	50.64	2.21	Lib	-1.88
Markham—Thornhill	PC	Hold	37.20	-2.48	53.58	4.76	PC	1.29
Markham—Unionville	PC	Hold	35.88	-3.25	61.16	4.74	Lib	-0.24
Milton	PC	Hold	41.98	-0.72	47.43	4.36	Lib	-1.34
Mississauga Centre	PC	Hold	38.15	0.01	46.79	3.19	Lib	-2.37
Mississauga East—Cooksville	PC	Hold	41.45	1.87	46.43	5.51	Lib	-2.86
Mississauga—Erin Mills	PC	Hold	41.03	-0.67	44.26	2.12	Lib	-3.36
Mississauga—Lakeshore	PC	Hold	46.17	-0.77	47.54	2.45	Lib	-3.46
Mississauga—Malton	PC	Hold	36.70	0.18	50.94	6.05	Lib	-4.15
Mississauga—Streetsville	PC	Hold	44.31	1.64	47.71	2.13	Lib	-3.84
Nepean	Lib	Gain	45.28	-0.60	48.53	14.07	Lib	-7.04
Newmarket—Aurora	PC	Hold	43.79	-0.62	47.56	2.59	Lib	-5.06
Niagara Centre	NDP	Hold	48.38	5.01	42.18	2.48	NDP	0.14
Niagara Falls	NDP	Hold	45.01	1.41	54.95	6.87	NDP	0.95
Niagara West	PC	Hold	54.90	1.73	51.13	6.20	PC	2.20
Nickel Belt	NDP	Hold	50.51	4.99	48.37	-2.41	PC	-2.91
Nipissing	PC	Hold	48.93	0.65	54.83	4.62	PC	1.53
Northumberland—Peterborough South	PC	Hold	52.30	0.58	52.11	1.18	Lib	-3.72
Oakville	PC	Hold	49.29	-1.00	48.01	2.57	Lib	-3.21
Oakville North—Burlington	PC	Hold	46.55	-0.34	49.70	2.51	Lib	-2.79
Orléans	Lib	Hold	47.70	1.11	54.18	7.92	PC	-1.33
Oshawa	NDP	Hold	41.63	2.15	45.87	3.80	PC	-0.65
Ottawa Centre	NDP	Hold	49.09	-1.65	55.70	1.36	Lib	-0.36
Ottawa South	Lib	Hold	42.49	0.01	53.24	8.10	Lib	3.00
Ottawa—Vanier	Lib	Hold	38.82	-0.60	51.45	9.73	Lib	3.84
Ottawa West—Nepean	NDP	Hold	45.16	-2.27	49.33	11.79	NDP	3.11
Oxford	PC	Hold	48.62	2.17	55.26	5.25	PC	5.23
Parkdale—High Park	NDP	Hold	51.82	1.56	45.35	-8.61	Lib	-4.23
Parry Sound—Muskoka	PC	Hold	53.71	0.62	46.80	1.43	Green	-0.53
Perth—Wellington	PC	Hold	52.68	2.59	47.40	0.59	PC	4.71
Peterborough—Kawartha	PC	Hold	52.18	0.72	40.68	2.10	Lib	-3.07
Pickering—Uxbridge	PC	Hold	45.64	0.35	48.06	3.63	Lib	-5.48
Renfrew—Nipissing—Pembroke	PC	Hold	48.95	2.66	54.83	-6.29	PC	1.09
Richmond Hill	PC	Hold	35.56	-0.58	55.43	3.19	Lib	-1.18
St. Catharines	NDP	Hold	49.88	3.22	42.12	2.41	PC	-0.35
Sarnia—Lambton	PC	Hold	50.52	3.83	51.32	-1.40	PC	1.97
Sault Ste. Marie	PC	Hold	49.92	5.43	43.07	-3.82	NDP	-2.69
Scarborough—Agincourt	PC	Hold	37.34	-2.08	49.39	0.36	Lib	-2.32
Scarborough Centre	PC	Hold	38.65	-2.60	44.05	8.05	Lib	-5.98
Scarborough—Guildwood	Lib	Hold	38.63	-3.00	51.02	4.71	PC	-3.12
Scarborough North	PC	Hold	37.00	-2.26	52.98	4.67	Lib	-2.57
Scarborough—Rouge Park	PC	Hold	42.43	-2.68	49.17	3.89	Lib	-6.26
Scarborough Southwest	NDP	Hold	41.73	-2.61	42.89	-4.78	PC	-1.52
Simcoe—Grey	PC	Hold	44.18	0.66	53.59	2.41	Lib	-5.17
Simcoe North	PC	Hold	46.11	-0.13	51.38	1.58	PC	3.89
Spadina—Fort York	NDP	Hold	41.95	7.60	45.00	-1.06	Lib	-1.80
Stormont—Dundas—South Glengarry	PC	Hold	42.98	1.34	61.57	4.07	Lib	-0.68
Sudbury	NDP	Hold	47.41	2.81	46.74	5.89	PC	-4.82
Thornhill	PC	Hold	39.93	0.05	63.99	10.70	PC	0.68
Thunder Bay—Atikokan	PC	Hold	49.28	6.19	45.71	9.41	PC	3.53
Thunder Bay—Superior North	NDP	Hold	48.91	5.67	40.57	6.46	PC	-1.59
Timiskaming—Cochrane	NDP	Hold	48.43	5.82	43.96	1.22	PC	-1.32
Timmins	PC	Hold	41.91	-1.62	68.41	3.61	PC	4.82
Toronto Centre	NDP	Hold	42.59	2.77	44.50	0.73	NDP	0.27
Toronto—Danforth	NDP	Hold	49.76	0.32	60.40	5.00	NDP	0.57
Toronto—St. Paul's	Lib	Gain	46.91	-1.17	40.87	7.20	Lib	-3.60
University—Rosedale	NDP	Hold	44.45	1.25	45.50	7.95	Lib	-1.69
Vaughan—Woodbridge	PC	Hold	42.56	-1.47	65.13	11.35	PC	4.26
Waterloo	NDP	Hold	51.58	3.17	50.23	4.34	NDP	0.96
Wellington—Halton Hills	PC	Hold	50.69	2.32	45.65	-4.96	PC	4.12
Whitby	PC	Hold	46.12	1.24	48.11	0.73	PC	7.44
Willowdale	PC	Hold	37.53	-2.31	46.29	1.63	Lib	-3.20
Windsor—Tecumseh	PC	Hold	45.18	4.57	48.15	2.26	NDP	-0.54
Windsor West	NDP	Hold	38.71	5.09	52.12	9.93	PC	-2.05
York Centre	PC	Hold	39.94	0.99	54.06	8.03	Lib	-1.85
York—Simcoe	PC	Hold	40.29	1.29	59.40	2.65	Lib	-3.33
York South—Weston	PC	Hold	38.60	0.49	35.22	-1.38	PC	4.19
Kiiwetinoong	NDP	Hold	27.00	-3.40	62.19	4.62	NDP	2.24
Mushkegowuk—James Bay	NDP	Hold	41.40	1.99	45.44	-1.74	PC	-4.79

=== Changes in party vote shares ===
Share change analysis by party and riding (2025 vs 2022)
Riding	Green		Liberal		NDP		PC	
Riding	%	Change (pp)	%	Change (pp)	%	Change (pp)	%	Change (pp)
Ajax	2.10	-1.36	44.96	8.98	7.01	-9.68	44.16	3.47
Algoma—Manitoulin	2.48	-0.63	14.49	5.78	27.19	-18.74	41.33	5.85
Aurora—Oak Ridges—Richmond Hill	1.77	-2.12	33.86	3.14	5.61	-2.07	57.19	3.93
Barrie—Innisfil	4.06	-2.25	26.05	7.95	13.36	-5.78	54.11	3.87
Barrie—Springwater—Oro-Medonte	4.07	-0.23	35.61	-5.74	6.73	-1.10	49.88	7.77
Bay of Quinte	3.47	-2.80	31.38	12.93	18.83	-2.09	44.14	-5.17
Beaches—East York	3.08	-7.14	51.17	15.75	22.94	-10.27	21.38	2.84
Brampton Centre	3.69	0.09	33.92	8.91	8.77	-17.89	51.85	10.49
Brampton East	2.66	0.74	29.86	8.74	10.89	-20.17	51.77	7.45
Brampton North	2.44	-0.54	30.30	1.53	8.10	-11.71	57.52	12.53
Brampton South	3.11	-0.48	32.55	4.73	8.24	-10.90	52.53	7.15
Brampton West	2.61	-0.16	32.51	6.27	5.89	-14.86	56.58	8.74
Brantford—Brant	5.08	-1.68	20.25	7.30	23.46	-4.83	47.23	3.06
Bruce—Grey—Owen Sound	12.46	3.61	29.44	9.11	7.91	-6.01	44.14	-4.42
Burlington	3.42	-3.27	43.07	13.65	8.03	-9.61	43.14	0.59
Cambridge	5.72	-3.25	34.39	13.69	11.53	-10.66	43.66	6.63
Carleton	1.81	-3.67	38.57	11.68	7.14	-8.53	49.61	1.47
Chatham-Kent—Leamington	2.90	-0.47	18.37	18.37	17.14	-13.13	52.03	4.50
Davenport	3.05	-1.77	20.57	1.36	57.07	0.00	17.88	3.80
Don Valley East	2.85	-1.21	56.65	12.79	7.67	-7.84	32.17	-0.02
Don Valley North	2.57	-1.15	43.77	6.94	5.11	-4.76	37.58	-9.82
Don Valley West	3.28	-2.23	57.21	13.20	3.95	-5.27	33.89	-4.76
Dufferin—Caledon	12.39	-1.74	25.38	6.56	6.41	-4.36	52.49	2.82
Durham	2.40	-1.62	29.39	4.50	14.29	-4.30	50.48	4.63
Eglinton—Lawrence	3.45	-0.41	48.07	7.11	–	-9.68	48.48	6.19
Elgin—Middlesex—London	5.70	1.03	24.47	7.07	9.20	-9.00	55.78	4.70
Essex	2.32	0.29	15.73	7.14	21.76	-6.52	55.61	4.51
Etobicoke Centre	2.16	-2.33	41.83	7.78	4.65	-3.96	48.10	-0.49
Etobicoke—Lakeshore	2.35	-2.40	48.52	12.80	7.01	-10.91	40.54	3.06
Etobicoke North	2.03	-0.72	28.38	4.94	7.96	-5.15	59.40	3.89
Flamborough—Glanbrook	3.99	-1.45	31.42	11.01	12.65	-10.09	49.38	3.18
Glengarry—Prescott—Russell	2.27	-1.49	37.03	-2.46	4.97	-3.56	51.36	9.31
Guelph	56.94	2.49	11.43	-1.86	5.82	-2.24	23.92	3.52
Haldimand—Norfolk	1.55	-2.50	5.52	-1.81	4.06	-9.83	24.48	-6.01
Haliburton—Kawartha Lakes—Brock	5.10	-2.45	22.97	9.50	13.73	-1.99	52.03	-0.28
Hamilton Centre	4.91	-3.86	21.31	8.28	38.36	-18.90	18.92	2.45
Hamilton East—Stoney Creek	5.26	0.31	31.61	10.54	17.60	-9.74	42.07	7.48
Hamilton Mountain	4.00	-1.62	30.93	15.36	26.02	-18.79	36.16	6.15
Hamilton West—Ancaster—Dundas	3.45	-1.92	22.80	4.62	38.87	-1.55	33.11	0.12
Hastings—Lennox and Addington	3.30	-1.23	29.75	11.15	11.54	-7.47	48.58	1.03
Humber River—Black Creek	1.62	-0.25	27.38	-3.28	35.33	0.84	34.55	4.80
Huron—Bruce	5.58	1.48	28.02	9.31	11.74	-4.64	50.02	-1.95
Kanata—Carleton	2.52	-2.97	47.91	24.49	7.18	-17.06	40.65	-2.96
Kenora—Rainy River	1.91	-1.88	17.46	6.11	18.81	-1.11	59.93	0.35
King—Vaughan	2.10	-0.60	28.01	-0.49	3.86	-3.09	64.17	6.86
Kingston and the Islands	2.21	-1.07	61.57	23.91	12.32	-18.83	22.24	-2.32
Kitchener Centre	51.39	38.59	14.28	-0.44	6.84	-33.75	24.22	-2.45
Kitchener—Conestoga	5.46	-0.70	29.49	11.96	18.51	-10.36	41.54	1.51
Kitchener South—Hespeler	8.75	-2.82	25.72	9.40	17.90	-8.54	45.42	5.51
Lambton—Kent—Middlesex	3.55	-0.43	26.24	16.66	12.23	-6.61	53.55	-5.25
Lanark—Frontenac—Kingston	3.35	-3.40	32.79	17.04	10.56	-10.14	49.10	-1.02
Leeds—Grenville—Thousand Islands and Rideau Lakes	4.23	-1.82	27.19	9.07	9.85	-3.72	55.12	-2.57
London—Fanshawe	2.65	-0.85	12.40	2.03	47.59	0.53	34.21	1.45
London North Centre	3.32	-1.47	15.63	-5.29	46.71	7.06	32.64	2.35
London West	1.89	-1.54	11.09	-1.10	49.21	4.08	34.96	1.11
Markham—Stouffville	2.27	-1.68	41.44	5.96	4.56	-4.90	50.64	2.21
Markham—Thornhill	2.34	-0.22	39.68	2.17	4.41	-4.64	53.58	4.76
Markham—Unionville	2.35	-1.32	30.89	0.47	3.95	-3.33	61.16	4.74
Milton	2.67	-1.47	41.44	2.68	5.67	-4.03	47.43	4.36
Mississauga Centre	2.90	-0.62	41.06	4.74	6.51	-5.77	46.79	3.19
Mississauga East—Cooksville	2.06	-1.92	43.08	5.73	5.20	-5.63	46.43	5.51
Mississauga—Erin Mills	2.86	-1.42	44.20	6.72	5.54	-6.60	44.26	2.12
Mississauga—Lakeshore	2.40	-2.63	43.68	6.92	4.56	-3.94	47.54	2.45
Mississauga—Malton	1.89	-2.15	38.75	8.30	6.74	-10.97	50.94	6.05
Mississauga—Streetsville	2.53	-0.47	43.17	7.69	5.02	-6.97	47.71	2.13
Nepean	1.89	-1.99	48.53	14.07	8.81	-10.53	38.43	-0.83
Newmarket—Aurora	2.55	-3.06	41.60	10.13	6.36	-6.36	47.56	2.59
Niagara Centre	2.61	-1.92	14.76	1.44	42.18	2.48	37.35	-0.28
Niagara Falls	1.56	-1.14	6.32	-2.10	54.95	6.87	34.53	-1.90
Niagara West	4.00	-2.46	24.75	5.58	16.32	-4.40	51.13	6.20
Nickel Belt	1.78	-1.21	10.94	1.05	48.37	-2.41	35.67	5.81
Nipissing	4.08	0.74	12.62	-0.91	25.21	-3.05	54.83	4.62
Northumberland—Peterborough South	3.65	-2.02	32.37	7.43	9.32	-3.80	52.11	1.18
Oakville	2.61	-2.58	44.11	6.42	3.91	-2.87	48.01	2.57
Oakville North—Burlington	2.74	-1.56	40.90	5.59	5.38	-4.54	49.70	2.51
Orléans	2.48	-2.07	54.18	7.92	6.00	-7.79	35.31	2.66
Oshawa	2.06	-1.96	8.76	-0.37	45.87	3.80	41.53	1.29
Ottawa Centre	2.66	-2.21	23.30	0.72	55.70	1.36	16.41	0.69
Ottawa South	2.88	-1.78	53.24	8.10	17.76	-5.99	24.60	1.41
Ottawa—Vanier	5.17	-2.63	51.45	9.73	18.25	-7.68	22.56	2.39
Ottawa West—Nepean	2.40	-1.13	17.75	-4.69	49.33	11.79	28.72	-6.22
Oxford	4.46	-0.28	23.17	10.86	10.97	-10.47	55.26	5.25
Parkdale—High Park	4.35	-1.71	30.83	8.45	45.35	-8.61	17.82	3.12
Parry Sound—Muskoka	41.69	1.07	6.09	6.09	2.86	-4.83	46.80	1.43
Perth—Wellington	7.53	1.21	27.88	11.75	12.62	-9.43	47.40	0.59
Peterborough—Kawartha	3.17	-0.49	36.69	6.14	16.86	-4.52	40.68	2.10
Pickering—Uxbridge	2.84	-2.40	39.52	10.97	7.39	-8.64	48.06	3.63
Renfrew—Nipissing—Pembroke	2.53	-1.12	22.13	12.35	14.91	-2.19	54.83	-6.29
Richmond Hill	2.87	-0.11	34.26	2.36	5.75	-3.35	55.43	3.19
St. Catharines	2.21	-1.88	17.31	0.68	42.12	2.41	35.13	0.70
Sarnia—Lambton	1.90	-1.25	18.37	7.92	19.68	-3.93	51.32	-1.40
Sault Ste. Marie	1.39	-1.12	10.00	4.01	42.69	5.39	43.07	-3.82
Scarborough—Agincourt	2.04	-0.15	41.91	4.64	5.02	-3.76	49.39	0.36
Scarborough Centre	3.03	0.23	42.32	11.95	8.66	-17.56	44.05	8.05
Scarborough—Guildwood	2.44	-0.38	51.02	4.71	6.69	-9.97	37.76	6.25
Scarborough North	1.89	0.06	34.75	5.14	10.38	-8.03	52.98	4.67
Scarborough—Rouge Park	2.19	-0.22	40.23	12.53	7.09	-14.83	49.17	3.89
Scarborough Southwest	3.52	-0.02	22.94	4.38	42.89	-4.78	30.65	3.04
Simcoe—Grey	5.53	-3.44	32.44	10.34	5.72	-5.34	53.59	2.41
Simcoe North	6.65	-2.15	27.56	10.11	9.95	-7.79	51.38	1.58
Spadina—Fort York	2.69	-2.93	31.55	3.60	45.00	-1.06	20.12	1.74
Stormont—Dundas—South Glengarry	2.60	-1.49	19.23	1.35	12.53	-1.26	61.57	4.07
Sudbury	2.37	-2.66	10.61	-8.86	46.74	5.89	38.61	9.65
Thornhill	2.15	-1.19	28.32	-1.36	3.59	-4.22	63.99	10.70
Thunder Bay—Atikokan	1.52	-1.41	24.64	0.25	25.86	-7.07	45.71	9.41
Thunder Bay—Superior North	1.59	-1.40	21.30	-6.98	40.57	6.46	34.05	3.19
Timiskaming—Cochrane	5.39	-1.13	9.70	2.68	43.96	1.22	37.87	2.64
Timmins	1.81	-0.43	8.23	8.23	19.94	-9.64	68.41	3.61
Toronto Centre	2.69	-2.42	36.16	-0.55	44.50	0.73	14.54	2.39
Toronto—Danforth	2.83	-3.25	21.22	-1.14	60.40	5.00	14.56	1.11
Toronto—St. Paul's	2.04	-3.41	40.87	7.20	31.74	-4.51	25.34	2.95
University—Rosedale	3.12	-12.76	30.73	3.37	45.50	7.95	19.89	2.31
Vaughan—Woodbridge	1.76	-0.17	26.57	-8.51	4.14	-1.21	65.13	11.35
Waterloo	3.64	-3.29	15.71	1.80	50.23	4.34	27.40	-1.93
Wellington—Halton Hills	15.68	1.54	27.56	13.58	7.37	-8.23	45.65	-4.96
Whitby	2.67	-2.53	39.64	18.92	7.95	-14.88	48.11	0.73
Willowdale	2.49	-1.13	44.35	6.39	5.45	-4.85	46.29	1.63
Windsor—Tecumseh	1.88	-0.72	14.34	-0.18	31.04	1.08	48.15	2.26
Windsor West	2.33	-0.44	–	-13.10	52.12	9.93	39.41	4.11
York Centre	2.17	-0.67	35.64	3.70	5.60	-8.39	54.06	8.03
York—Simcoe	4.82	-2.52	23.90	6.65	7.71	-3.44	59.40	2.65
York South—Weston	2.67	0.14	34.58	10.34	25.61	-8.38	35.22	-1.38
Kiiwetinoong	2.69	-0.63	7.24	1.34	62.19	4.62	25.46	-4.47
Mushkegowuk—James Bay	1.45	-0.49	7.78	-3.96	45.44	-1.74	45.33	9.57

= did not field a candidate in 2022

=== Relative party strengths (measured by swing) ===
Party on party swings by riding (PC/Liberal/NDP, 2025 vs 2022) (Note: Positive swings are for the second party of the pair; negatives are towards the first party shown.)
Riding	↔ Liberal/PC	↔ Liberal/NDP	↔ PC/NDP
Ajax	-2.76	-9.33	-6.57
Algoma—Manitoulin	0.03	-12.26	-12.30
Aurora—Oak Ridges—Richmond Hill	0.39	-2.61	-3.00
Barrie—Innisfil	-2.04	-6.87	-4.82
Barrie—Springwater—Oro-Medonte	6.76	2.32	-4.43
Bay of Quinte	-9.05	-7.51	1.54
Beaches—East York	-6.46	-13.01	-6.55
Brampton Centre	0.79	-13.40	-14.19
Brampton East	-0.64	-14.45	-13.81
Brampton North	5.50	-6.62	-12.12
Brampton South	1.21	-7.82	-9.03
Brampton West	1.23	-10.57	-11.80
Brantford—Brant	-2.12	-6.06	-3.95
Bruce—Grey—Owen Sound	-6.77	-7.56	-0.79
Burlington	-6.53	-11.63	-5.10
Cambridge	-3.53	-12.18	-8.65
Carleton	-5.11	-10.11	-5.00
Chatham-Kent—Leamington	N/A (Note: Liberals did not field a candidate in 2022.)		-8.82
Davenport	1.22	-0.68	-1.90
Don Valley East	-6.40	-10.32	-3.91
Don Valley North	-8.38	-5.85	2.53
Don Valley West	-8.98	-9.24	-0.26
Dufferin—Caledon	-1.87	-5.46	-3.59
Durham	0.06	-4.40	-4.46
Eglinton—Lawrence	-0.46	N/A (Note: NDP did not field a candidate in 2025.)	
Elgin—Middlesex—London	-1.19	-8.04	-6.85
Essex	-1.32	-6.83	-5.52
Etobicoke Centre	-4.13	-5.87	-1.74
Etobicoke—Lakeshore	-4.87	-11.85	-6.98
Etobicoke North	-0.52	-5.04	-4.52
Flamborough—Glanbrook	-3.91	-10.55	-6.63
Glengarry—Prescott—Russell	5.89	-0.55	-6.44
Guelph	2.69	-0.19	-2.88
Haldimand—Norfolk	-2.10	-4.01	-1.91
Haliburton—Kawartha Lakes—Brock	-4.89	-5.75	-0.85
Hamilton Centre	-2.91	-13.59	-10.67
Hamilton East—Stoney Creek	-1.53	-10.14	-8.61
Hamilton Mountain	-4.60	-17.08	-12.47
Hamilton West—Ancaster—Dundas	-2.25	-3.08	-0.83
Hastings—Lennox and Addington	-5.06	-9.31	-4.25
Humber River—Black Creek	4.04	2.06	-1.98
Huron—Bruce	-5.63	-6.97	-1.35
Kanata—Carleton	-13.73	-20.78	-7.05
Kenora—Rainy River	-2.88	-3.61	-0.73
King—Vaughan	3.68	-1.30	-4.97
Kingston and the Islands	-13.12	-21.37	-8.25
Kitchener Centre	-1.01	-16.65	-15.65
Kitchener—Conestoga	-5.22	-11.16	-5.94
Kitchener South—Hespeler	-1.94	-8.97	-7.02
Lambton—Kent—Middlesex	-10.96	-11.64	-0.68
Lanark—Frontenac—Kingston	-9.03	-13.59	-4.56
Leeds—Grenville—Thousand Islands and Rideau Lakes	-5.82	-6.39	-0.57
London—Fanshawe	-0.29	-0.75	-0.46
London North Centre	3.82	6.18	2.36
London West	1.10	2.59	1.49
Markham—Stouffville	-1.88	-5.43	-3.55
Markham—Thornhill	1.29	-3.41	-4.70
Markham—Unionville	2.13	-1.90	-4.04
Milton	0.84	-3.36	-4.20
Mississauga Centre	-0.78	-5.26	-4.48
Mississauga East—Cooksville	-0.11	-5.68	-5.57
Mississauga—Erin Mills	-2.30	-6.66	-4.36
Mississauga—Lakeshore	-2.24	-5.43	-3.20
Mississauga—Malton	-1.12	-9.63	-8.51
Mississauga—Streetsville	-2.78	-7.33	-4.55
Nepean	-7.45	-12.30	-4.85
Newmarket—Aurora	-3.77	-8.24	-4.48
Niagara Centre	-0.86	0.52	1.38
Niagara Falls	0.10	4.49	4.39
Niagara West	0.31	-4.99	-5.30
Nickel Belt	2.38	-1.73	-4.11
Nipissing	2.77	-1.07	-3.84
Northumberland—Peterborough South	-3.13	-5.62	-2.49
Oakville	-1.92	-4.64	-2.72
Oakville North—Burlington	-1.54	-5.07	-3.53
Orléans	-2.63	-7.85	-5.23
Oshawa	0.83	2.08	1.25
Ottawa Centre	-0.02	0.32	0.34
Ottawa South	-3.34	-7.05	-3.70
Ottawa—Vanier	-3.67	-8.71	-5.03
Ottawa West—Nepean	-0.76	8.24	9.00
Oxford	-2.81	-10.67	-7.86
Parkdale—High Park	-2.66	-8.53	-5.87
Parry Sound—Muskoka	N/A		-3.13
Perth—Wellington	-5.58	-10.59	-5.01
Peterborough—Kawartha	-2.02	-5.33	-3.31
Pickering—Uxbridge	-3.67	-9.81	-6.14
Renfrew—Nipissing—Pembroke	-9.32	-7.27	2.05
Richmond Hill	0.41	-2.86	-3.27
St. Catharines	0.01	0.87	0.85
Sarnia—Lambton	-4.66	-5.92	-1.27
Sault Ste. Marie	-3.92	0.69	4.61
Scarborough—Agincourt	-2.14	-4.20	-2.06
Scarborough Centre	-1.95	-14.76	-12.81
Scarborough—Guildwood	0.77	-7.34	-8.11
Scarborough North	-0.24	-6.59	-6.35
Scarborough—Rouge Park	-4.32	-13.68	-9.36
Scarborough Southwest	-0.67	-4.58	-3.91
Simcoe—Grey	-3.97	-7.84	-3.87
Simcoe North	-4.27	-8.95	-4.68
Spadina—Fort York	-0.93	-2.33	-1.40
Stormont—Dundas—South Glengarry	1.36	-1.31	-2.67
Sudbury	9.25	7.37	-1.88
Thornhill	6.03	-1.43	-7.46
Thunder Bay—Atikokan	4.58	-3.66	-8.24
Thunder Bay—Superior North	5.08	6.72	1.63
Timiskaming—Cochrane	-0.02	-0.73	-0.71
Timmins	N/A		-6.62
Toronto Centre	1.47	0.64	-0.83
Toronto—Danforth	1.13	3.07	1.95
Toronto—St. Paul's	-2.13	-5.86	-3.73
University—Rosedale	-0.53	2.29	2.82
Vaughan—Woodbridge	9.93	3.65	-6.28
Waterloo	-1.86	1.27	3.13
Wellington—Halton Hills	-9.27	-10.91	-1.64
Whitby	-9.09	-16.90	-7.81
Willowdale	-2.38	-5.62	-3.24
Windsor—Tecumseh	1.22	0.63	-0.59
Windsor West	N/A (Note: Liberals did not field a candidate in 2025.)		2.91
York Centre	2.16	-6.05	-8.21
York—Simcoe	-2.00	-5.04	-3.04
York South—Weston	-5.86	-9.36	-3.50
Kiiwetinoong	-2.91	1.64	4.55
Mushkegowuk—James Bay	6.77	1.11	-5.66

Party on party swings (Ridings with significant Green presence, 2025 vs 2022) (Note: Positive swings are for the second party of the pair; negatives are towards the first party shown.) (Note: Restricted to ridings where the Greens finished in the top three, or otherwise received a share greater than 10%, in either election.)
Riding	↔ Liberal/PC	↔ Liberal/Green	↔ PC/Green	↔ NDP/Green
Beaches—East York	-6.46	-11.44	-4.99	1.57
Bruce—Grey—Owen Sound	-6.77	-2.75	4.02	4.81
Dufferin—Caledon	-1.87	-4.15	-2.28	1.31
Eglinton—Lawrence	-0.46	-3.76	-3.30	N/A
Guelph	2.69	2.17	-0.52	2.36
Kitchener Centre	-1.01	19.52	20.52	36.17
Kitchener South—Hespeler	-1.94	-6.11	-4.17	2.86
Parry Sound—Muskoka	N/A		-0.18	2.95
University—Rosedale	-0.53	-8.07	-7.54	-10.36
Wellington—Halton Hills	-9.27	-6.02	3.25	4.88

= Greens met threshold in 2022 only
= Greens met threshold in 2025 only

== Analysis ==
=== Analytical charts ===
2025 vs 2022

2025 (by winning party)
2025 vs 2022

2025 (by party finishing second)
2025 vs 2022

2025
2025 vs 2022

2025 (by winning party)

=== Summary ===
Party candidates in 2nd place
Party in 1st place	Party in 2nd place				Total
Party in 1st place	PC	NDP	Liberal	Grn	Total
Progressive Conservative		10	69	1	80
New Democratic	19		8		27
Liberal	12	2			14
Green	2				2
Independent	1				1
Total	34	12	77	1	124

Principal races, according to 1st and 2nd-place results
Parties		Seats
█ Progressive Conservative	█ Liberal	81
█ New Democratic	█ Progressive Conservative	29
█ New Democratic	█ Liberal	10
█ Green	█ Progressive Conservative	3
█ Independent	█ Progressive Conservative	1
Total		124

Candidates ranked 1st to 5th place, by party
Parties	1st	2nd	3rd	4th	5th
█ Progressive Conservative	80	34	10		
█ New Democratic	27	12	76	8	
█ Liberal	14	77	32		
█ Green	2	1	4	102	13
█ Independent	1		1	3	2
█ Ontario Party			1	2	6
█ New Blue				8	85
█ None of the Above					3
█ Communist					2
█ Libertarian					2
█ Northern Ontario					2
█ Moderate					1
█ Progress Party Ontario					1
█ Stop the New Sex-Ed Agenda					1

=== Seats changing hands ===
Of the 124 seats, 13 were open because of MPPs who chose not to stand for reelection, and voters in only 9 seats changed allegiance from the previous election in 2022. Three incumbents ousted from their parties opted to stand as independents, but none were re-elected.

Elections to the 43rd Legislative Assembly of Ontario – seats won/lost by party, 2022–2025
Party	2022	Gain from (loss to)								2025
Party	2022	PC		NDP		Lib		Grn		2025
Progressive Conservative	83			2			(5)			80
New Democratic	31		(2)				(1)		(1)	27
Liberal	8	5		1						14
Green	1			1						2
Independent	1									1
Total	124	5	(2)	4	–	–	(6)	–	(1)	124

There were 9 seats that changed allegiance in the election:

PC to Liberal

- Ajax
- Don Valley North
- Etobicoke—Lakeshore
- Kanata—Carleton
- Nepean

NDP to PC

- Algoma—Manitoulin
- Hamilton Mountain

NDP to Liberal

- Toronto—St. Paul's

NDP to Green

- Kitchener Centre

Of the 9 seats that changed hands:

- two were open seats where the MPPs chose to retire,
- two had already switched over in by-elections,
- two had parties that ousted their incumbents, but still failed to hold onto the seat, and
- three others saw their incumbents defeated.

Resulting composition of the 44th Legislative Assembly of Ontario
Source		Party					
Source		PC	NDP	Lib	Grn	Ind	Total
Seats retained	Incumbents returned	69	24	8	1	1	103
Seats retained	Open seats held	9	2				11
Seats retained	Ouster of incumbents changing affiliation		1				1
Seats changing hands	Incumbents defeated			3			4
Seats changing hands	Open seats gained	1		1			2
Seats changing hands	Byelection gains held			1	1		2
Seats changing hands	Ouster of incumbents standing as independents	1		1			2
Total		80	27	14	2	1	124

== Student Vote results ==
Student Vote elections are mock elections that run parallel to real elections, in which students not of voting age participate. They are administered by CIVIX Canada, in partnership with Elections Ontario. Student Vote elections are for educational purposes and do not count towards the actual results.

Summary of the 2025 Ontario Student Vote
Party	Leader	Seats			Votes		
Party	Leader	Elected	2022	±	#	%	Change
Progressive Conservative	Doug Ford	51	17	▲34	58,189	24.14%	▲5.45
New Democratic	Marit Stiles	41	75	▼34	56,570	23.47%	▼5.09
Liberal	Bonnie Crombie	28	28	Steady	57,228	23.74%	▼1.68
Green	Mike Schreiner	3	4	▼1	37,489	15.55%	▼0.44
Independent		1	0	▲1	5,362	2.22%	▲1.32
New Blue	Jim Karahalios	0	0	0	13,643	5.66%	▲0.07
Ontario Party	Derek Sloan	0	0	0	5,221	2.17%	▼1.78
Others		0	0	0	7,341	3.03%	▼2.11
Valid votes					234,807	—N/a	—N/a
Rejected ballots					7,600	—N/a	—N/a
Total votes cast		124	124	Steady	242,407	—N/a	—N/a
Source: Student Vote Ontario 2025 Archived 2025-02-28 at the Wayback Machine

== Opinion polls ==
Graph of opinion polls conducted. Trend lines represent local regressions.

Opinion polls conducted during period
Polling firm	Last date of polling	Source	PC	NDP	Liberal	Green	Other	Margin of error	Sample size	Polling type	Lead
2025 election	February 27, 2025	—N/a	42.97	18.55	29.95	4.83	3.70	—N/a	—N/a	—N/a	13.02
Mainstreet Research	February 26, 2025		44	17	30	6	4	±2.7%	1270 (1/3)	Smart IVR (rolling)	14
Nanos Research	February 26, 2025		48	15	26	6	4	±3.9%	630	telephone (rolling)/online	22
Forum Research	February 26, 2025		41	20	32	5	3	±4%	1013	IVR	9
Pallas Data	February 26, 2025		46	17	29	5	2	±3.1%	989	IVR	17
Research Co.	February 26, 2025		46	17	30	5	2	±3.9%	701	online	16
Ipsos	February 25, 2025		48	16	28	6	2	± 3.1%	1501	Online	20
Relay Strategies	February 25, 2025		48	16	28	8	—N/a	±3%	756 (1/3)	Online	20
Abacus Data	February 25, 2025		45	16	29	5	5	±3.1%	1,000	Online	16
Mainstreet Research	February 25, 2025		42	18	31	5	4	±2.5%	1516 (1/3)	Smart IVR (rolling)	11
Innovative Research	February 24, 2025		42	18	32	6	2	±4%	917	Online	10
Mainstreet Research	February 24, 2025		42	19	31	5	4	±2.6%	1414 (1/3)	Smart IVR (rolling)	11
Leger	February 23, 2025		47	17	28	6	2	±3.09%	1,005	Online	19
Liaison Strategies	February 23, 2025		42	18	32	5	3	±3.45%	805	IVR	10
Mainstreet Research	February 23, 2025		42	19	32	4	4	±2.7%	1335 (1/3)	Smart IVR (rolling)	10
Mainstreet Research	February 22, 2025		43	17	30	5	4	±2.8%	1238 (1/3)	Smart IVR (rolling)	13
Nanos Research	February 22, 2025		44	20	29	5	3	±3.3%	920	telephone (rolling)/online	15
Mainstreet Research	February 21, 2025		42	17	31	6	4	±2.8%	1245 (1/3)	Smart IVR (rolling)	11
Nanos Research	February 21, 2025		43	19	31	6	2	±3.3%	918	telephone (rolling)/online	12
Ipsos	February 20, 2025		46	21	25	4	4	± 4.2%	800	Online	21
Relay Strategies	February 20, 2025		47	18	26	8	—N/a	±3%	975 (1/3)	Online	21
Nanos Research	February 20, 2025		45	17	31	5	2	±3.2%	931	telephone (rolling)/online	14
Mainstreet Research	February 20, 2025		40	19	29	7	5	±2.8%	1243 (1/3)	Smart IVR (rolling)	11
Nanos Research	February 19, 2025		44	17	31	7	2	±3.2%	936	telephone (rolling)/online	13
Mainstreet Research	February 19, 2025		38	21	29	6	6	±2.7%	1291 (1/3)	Smart IVR (rolling)	9
Relay Strategies	February 18, 2025		47	17	27	9	—N/a	±4%	822 (1/3)	Online	20
Nanos Research	February 18, 2025		46	16	30	7	2	±3.2%	929	telephone (rolling)/online	16
Mainstreet Research	February 18, 2025		39	21	28	5	6	±2.7%	1281 (1/3)	Smart IVR (rolling)	11
Leger	February 17, 2025		48	16	28	5	3	±3.09%	1,002	Online	20
Mainstreet Research	February 17, 2025		41	18	30	5	6	±2.7%	1278 (1/3)	Smart IVR (rolling)	11
Probe Research	February 16, 2025		47	17	27	8	1	2.8%	1200	Online	20
Innovative Research	February 16, 2025		45	18	28	7	2	4%	963	Online	17
Relay Strategies	February 16, 2025		47	20	26	8	—N/a	±4%	704 (1/3)	Online	21
Nanos Research	February 16, 2025		46	18	27	7	2	±3.3%	912	telephone (rolling)/online	19
Mainstreet Research	February 16, 2025		41	18	31	6	5	±2.8%	1229 (1/3)	Smart IVR (rolling)	10
Abacus Data	February 15, 2025		41	21	28	6	3	±2.8%	1,500	Online	13
Nanos Research	February 15, 2025		45	18	30	5	2	±3.3%	915	telephone (rolling)/online	15
Mainstreet Research	February 15, 2025		43	17	30	6	3	±2.8%	1228 (1/3)	Smart IVR (rolling)	13
Mainstreet Research	February 14, 2025		43	19	29	6	3	2.7%	1272 (1/3)	Smart IVR (rolling)	14
Nanos Research	February 13, 2025		44	17	31	6	2	±3.2%	900	telephone (rolling)/online	13
Mainstreet Research	February 13, 2025		44	17	29	6	4	±2.7%	1294 (1/3)	Smart IVR (rolling)	15
Research Co.	February 13, 2025		45	15	31	4	4	±3.9%	702	online	14
Pallas Data	February 12, 2025		44.1	18.9	27.7	4.7	4.6	±2.1%	2,193	IVR	16.4
Nanos Research	February 12, 2025		45	17	29	6	2	±3.2%	938	telephone (rolling)/online	16
Mainstreet Research	February 12, 2025		42	17	31	6	4	±2.7%	1314 (1/3)	Smart IVR (rolling)	11
Relay Strategies	February 11, 2025		49	19	24	9	—N/a	±4%	656 (1/3)	Online	25
Mainstreet Research	February 11, 2025		41	16	32	7	4	±2.7%	1,301 (1/3)	Smart IVR (rolling)	9
Relay Strategies	February 10, 2025		50	19	22	9	—N/a	±4%	656 (1/3)	Online	28
Mainstreet Research	February 10, 2025		40	19	30	6	4	±2.7%	1,303 (1/3)	Smart IVR (rolling)	10
Nanos Research	February 10, 2025		44	17	32	5	2	±3.2%	920	telephone (rolling)/online	12
Relay Strategies	February 9, 2025		51	18	23	8	—N/a	±4%	656 (1/3)	Online	28
Leger	February 9, 2025		47	17	26	6	4 (Note: Includes 2% for the New Blue Party.)	±3.09%	1,004	Online	21
Liaison Strategies	February 9, 2025		41	18	31	6	4	±2.82%	1,201	IVR	10
Nanos Research	February 9, 2025		44	19	31	4	2	±3.2%	920	telephone (rolling)/online	13
Mainstreet Research	February 9, 2025		44	18	26	7	4	±2.7%	1,347 (1/3)	Smart IVR (rolling)	18
Nanos Research	February 8, 2025		44	20	28	5	3	±3.3%	913	telephone (rolling)/online	16
Mainstreet Research	February 8, 2025		41	21	25	7	5	±2.8%	1,187 (1/3)	Smart IVR (rolling)	16
Mainstreet Research	February 7, 2025		39	20	28	7	5	±2.5%	1,262 (1/3)	Smart IVR (rolling)	11
Abacus Data	February 6, 2025		46	21	24	5	4	±3.1%	2,000	Online	22
Mainstreet Research	February 6, 2025		39	22	29	5	6	±2.5%	1,236 (1/4)	Smart IVR (rolling)	10
Nanos Research	February 6, 2025		46	16	30	7	2	±3.3%	904	telephone (rolling)/online	16
Mainstreet Research	February 5, 2025		42	19	29	5	5	±2.8%	1,236 (1/3)	Smart IVR (rolling)	13
Mainstreet Research	February 4, 2025		45	16	29	5	5	±2.9%	1,162 (1/3)	Smart IVR (rolling)	16
Mainstreet Research	February 3, 2025		44	15	30	5	7	±3.0%	1,080 (1/3)	Smart IVR (rolling)	14
Angus Reid	February 3, 2025		43	21	26	5	5	±2%	1,760	Online	17
Pallas Data	February 2, 2025		45	21	28	5	2	±3.1%	1,014	IVR	17
Mainstreet Research	February 2, 2025		43	17	29	5	6	—N/a	1,374 (1/3)	Smart IVR (rolling)	14
Leger	February 2, 2025		47	17	23	8	4 (Note: Includes 2% for the New Blue Party.)	±3.09%	1,004	Online	24
Mainstreet Research	February 1, 2025		42	17	29	6	5	—N/a	1,124 (1/3)	Smart IVR (rolling)	13
Liaison Strategies	February 1, 2025		43	16	31	5	5	±2.74%	1,274	IVR	12
Mainstreet Research	January 31, 2025		43	19	29	5	4	—N/a	1,247 (1/3)	Smart IVR (rolling)	14
Innovative Research	January 31, 2025		49	19	22	9	1	—N/a	857	Online	27
Mainstreet Research	January 30, 2025		38	20	30	6	5	±2.4%	1,644 (1/3)	Smart IVR (rolling)	8
Ipsos	January 30, 2025		50	20	24	3	3	± 4.2%	800	Online	26
Mainstreet Research	January 29, 2025		38	22	29	5	6	—N/a	1,460	Smart IVR	9
	January 29, 2025	Election campaign begins									
Innovative Research	January 27, 2025		51	18	23	6	2	—N/a	1,286	Online	28
Mainstreet Research	January 26, 2025		36	23	29	6	6	±3.2%	936	Smart IVR	7
Abacus Data	January 26, 2025		47	19	24	7	3	±3.1%	1,021	Online	23
Campaign Research	January 26, 2025		47	18	23	7	5	—N/a	1,611	Online	24
Liaison Strategies	January 23, 2025		39	18	33	5	5	±2.71%	1,307	IVR	6
Yorkville Strategies	January 23, 2025		48	15	25	7	5	±4.0%	600	Online	23
Leger	January 19, 2025		46	19	22	7	6	±3.08%	1,007	Online	24
Liaison Strategies	January 16, 2025		41	19	32	5	4	±2.83%	1,197	IVR	9
Campaign Research	January 15, 2025		47	19	23	7	4	—N/a	1,789	Online	24
Mainstreet Research	January 15, 2025		40	21	30	5	4	±3.2%	943	Smart IVR	10
Liaison Strategies	January 9, 2025		40	21	30	4	5	±2.82%	1,202	IVR	10
Abacus Data	December 4, 2024		43	21	25	6	5	±2.6%	1,500	Online	18
Mainstreet Research	December 2, 2024		42	22	27	6	3	±3.6%	742	Smart IVR	15
Abacus Data	November 5, 2024		42	22	26	7	4	±3.1%	998	Online	16
Pallas Data	October 15, 2024		41.5	21.6	27.7	7.1	2.1	±3.1%	996	IVR	13.8
Abacus Data	October 10, 2024		44	22	24	7	4	±3.1%	997	Online	20
Angus Reid	September 18, 2024		40	25	23	7	4	±3.0%	858	Online	15
Mainstreet Research	September 17, 2024		41	18	30	5	6	±3.5%	764	Smart IVR	11
Abacus Data	August 17, 2024		42	21	26	8	4	±3.057%	1,028	Online	16
Liaison Strategies	August 20, 2024		40	21	27	6	6	±2.71%	1,300	IVR	13
Abacus Data	July 21, 2024		44	19	26	7	4	±3.1%	1,000	Online	18
Liaison Strategies	June 27, 2024		39	21	28	7	5	±2.77%	1,245	IVR	11
Abacus Data	June 25, 2024		41	22	25	8	4	±3.1%	1,000	Online	16
Pallas Data	June 4, 2024		39.4	22.6	26.5	8.3	3.2	±2.9%	1,136	IVR	12.9
Abacus Data	May 15, 2024		39	22	26	9	4	±3.1%	1,000	Online	13
Abacus Data	April 16, 2024		41	21	25	7	5	±3.1%	995	Online	16
Liaison Strategies	April 7, 2024		40	18	30	5	6	±2.74%	1,280	IVR	10
Abacus Data	March 21, 2024		41	21	27	7	5	±2.5%	1,500	Online	14
Liaison Strategies	March 9, 2024		39	21	29	5	6	±2.74%	1,283	IVR	10
Angus Reid	March 6, 2024		37	25	27	6	4	±3.0%	777	Online	10
Abacus Data	February 21, 2024		41	19	27	8	5	±3.1%	1,000	Online	14
Pallas Data	February 11, 2024		34.5	21.6	31.6	7.3	5.0	±2.9%	1,121	IVR	2.9
Liaison Strategies	February 3, 2024		38	22	30	5	5	±2.8%	1,236	IVR	8
Abacus Data	January 23, 2024		38	23	27	5	6	±3.1%	995	Online	11
Abacus Data	December 12, 2023		39	24	27	6	4	±3.1%	1,000	Online	12
Mainstreet Research	December 4, 2023		36	19	34	6	5	±3.3%	872	Smart IVR	2
	December 2, 2023	Bonnie Crombie is elected leader of the Ontario Liberal Party									
Abacus Data	November 28, 2023		42	24	23	7	4	±2.6%	1,500	Online	18
Innovative Research	October 30, 2023		41	26	25	7	2	—N/a	925	Online	15
Abacus Data	October 15, 2023		40	24	24	7	5	±3.7%	700	Online	16
Pallas Data	September 27, 2023		33.4	27.4	26.7	6.7	5.8	±3.2%	964	IVR	6
Angus Reid	September 6, 2023		38	28	22	7	5	—N/a	656	Online	10
Abacus Data	September 4, 2023		34	26	28	7	5	±2.2%	2,003	Online	6
Pallas Data	August 29, 2023		37.3	25.8	26.9	5.2	4.9	±3.2%	940	IVR	10.4
Abacus Data	August 23, 2023		38	24	25	7	6	±3.1%	1,040	Online	13
Abacus Data	July 25, 2023		41	23	24	7	5	±3.1%	1,000	Online	17
Mainstreet Research	June 30, 2023		34.7	24.7	25.0	10.7	4.9	±3.1%	993	Smart IVR	9.7
Abacus Data	June 11, 2023		36	26	27	6	4	±3.1%	1,000	Online	9
Counsel Public Affairs	June 8, 2023		39	23	27	7	4	—N/a	1,323	Online	12
Angus Reid	June 3, 2023		36	27	25	6	6	—N/a	653	Online	9
Angus Reid	March 13, 2023		38	30	20	6	6	±3%	861	Online	8
Abacus Data	March 4, 2023		41	22	28	5	4 (Note: Includes 2% for the New Blue Party.)	±3.1%	1,000	Online	13
Mainstreet Research	February 4, 2023		36.8	19.4	23.3	11.2	9.4	±2.9%	1,166	Smart IVR	13.5
	February 4, 2023	Marit Stiles is declared leader of the Ontario New Democratic Party									
Angus Reid	December 3, 2022		37	27	25	6	5	±3%	1,058	Online	10
Mainstreet Research	December 2, 2022		37.3	25.9	24.4	6.6	5.8	±2.9%	1,162	Smart IVR	11.4
Abacus Data	November 5, 2022		38	26	27	5	5 (Note: Includes 3% for the New Blue Party.)	±3.1%	1,000	Online	11
	August 3, 2022	Steven Del Duca resigns as leader of the Ontario Liberal Party; John Fraser becomes interim leader									
	June 28, 2022	Andrea Horwath resigns as leader of the Ontario New Democratic Party; Peter Tabuns becomes interim leader									
EKOS	June 20, 2022		37.5	23.3	19.2	9.8	10.2 (Note: Includes 5.2% for the New Blue Party.)	±2.7%	1,357	Online/Telephone	14.2
2022 election	June 2, 2022	—N/a	40.82	23.74	23.85	5.96	5.62	—N/a	—N/a	—N/a	16.97
