= Zee Hamid =

Canadian politician

The Honourable Zee Hamid ECO MPP
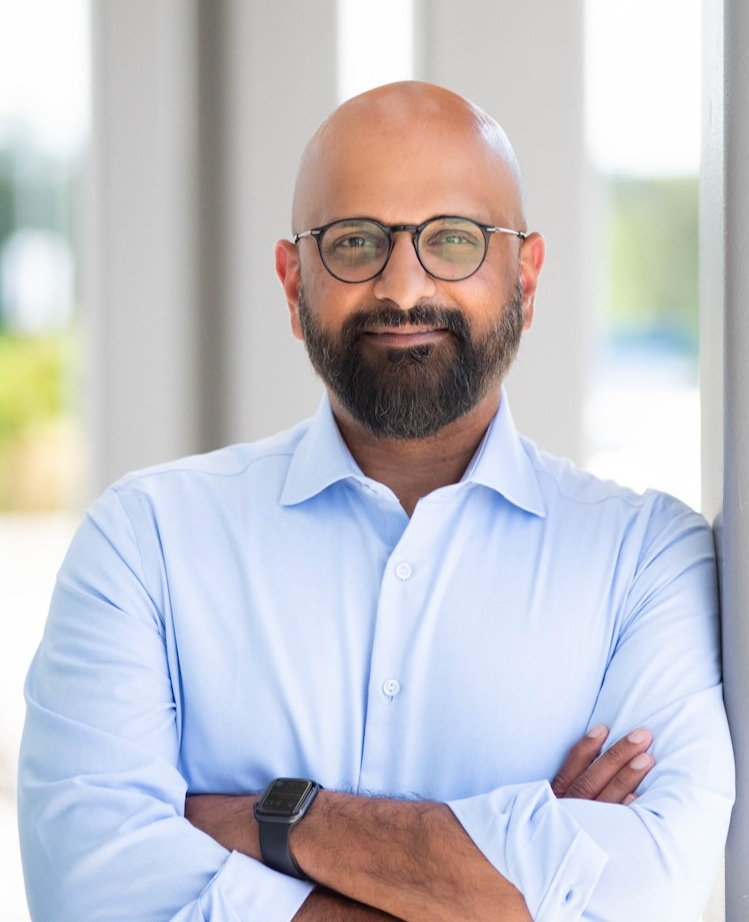
- Hamid in 2022

Minister of Tourism, Culture and Gaming
- Incumbent
- Assumed office September 10, 2026
- Premier: Doug Ford
- Preceded by: Stan Cho

Associate Solicitor General for Auto Theft and Bail Reform
- In office March 2025 – September 10, 2026
- Minister: Michael Kerzner
- Premier: Doug Ford
- Preceded by: Graham McGregor
- Succeeded by: position abolished

Parliamentary Assistant to the Minister of Finance
- In office June 2024 – March 2025
- Minister: Peter Bethlenfalvy
- Premier: Doug Ford
- Preceded by: Stephen Crawford

Member of the Ontario Provincial Parliament for Milton
- Incumbent
- Assumed office May 2, 2024
- Preceded by: Parm Gill

Personal details
- Born: Zeeshan Hamid Karachi, Pakistan
- Party: Progressive Conservative Party of Ontario
- Education: University of Waterloo (Bachelor of Mathematics and Computer Science)
- Occupation: Tech Executive

Zee (Zeeshan) Hamid ECO MPP is a Canadian politician and technologist serving as the Member of the Provincial Parliament for the Milton riding in Ontario. A member of the Ontario Progressive Conservative Party, he has been Minister of Tourism, Culture and Gaming since September 2026 and was previously Associate Solicitor General for Auto Theft and Bail Reform.

== Politics ==
=== Early activism and community roles ===
Prior to elected office, Hamid was active in local community and advisory committees in Milton. He served on the Milton Transit Advisory Committee and Halton’s Inter-Municipal Committee on Sustainability. In 2009 he ran a petition to advocate for an underpass on Derry Road in Milton.

=== Town of Milton Council ===
Hamid first ran for Milton town council in Ward 8 in 2010, winning by a margin of 23.38 points. He was re-elected in 2014

In 2016, he cast a deciding vote (as the final voter) to reduce the size of Milton’s council by two seats (rather than expanding by two). Because the motion was tied, his vote broke the tie.

=== Region of Halton Council ===
In 2018, Hamid successfully ran for Halton Regional Council, defeating multiple challengers, including Councillors John Pollard and Tony Lambert, with 54.47% of the vote.

In the 2022 Milton municipal election, he ran for Mayor of Milton but narrowly lost to long-serving incumbent Gordon Krantz by fewer than 1,000 votes.

=== Provincial Parliament ===
==== Nomination and by-election ====
When Parm Gill (then MPP for Milton) resigned to run federally, Hamid was nominated by the Progressive Conservatives to contest the by-election. His nomination generated controversy as he had donated $3,508 to the Ontario Liberal Party since 2014, including to former Liberal leader Steven Del Duca's 2020 leadership campaign. He had also run unsuccessfully for the federal Liberal nomination in his riding for the 2015 Canadian federal election.

On May 2, 2024, he was elected as MPP for Milton, receiving approximately 47% of the vote, compared to 38.3% for the Liberal candidate Naidoo Harris. His margin improved over the 2022 result in the riding.

In the 2025 general election, Hamid maintained his voter share, up from 47.04% to 47.4%.

==== Roles and ministerial appointment ====
From June 2024 to March 2025, Hamid served as Parliamentary Assistant to the Minister of Finance under Premier Doug Ford.

In March 2025, he was appointed Associate Solicitor General for Auto Theft and Bail Reform. In that capacity, he led provincial efforts to combat organized auto theft, strengthen bail compliance, and coordinate with police, prosecutors, and municipalities.

In 2026, he succeeded Stan Cho as Minister of Tourism, Culture and Gaming after Cho's resignation in July.

== Electoral record ==
2025 Ontario general election: Milton
Party	Candidate	Votes	%	±%
Progressive Conservative	Zee Hamid	20,091	47.43	+0.39
Liberal	Kristina Tesser Derksen	17,551	41.44	+3.18
New Democratic	Katherine-Anne Cirlincione	2,403	5.67	–1.09
Green	Susan Doyle	1,130	2.67	–0.09
New Blue	John Spina	866	2.04	–1.98
Centrist	Mohsin Rizvi	316	0.75	–
Total valid votes		42,357	99.45	
Total rejected, unmarked and declined ballots		235	0.55	+0.29
Turnout		42,592	41.98	+14.45
Eligible voters		101,453		
Progressive Conservative hold		Swing		–1.40
Source: Elections Ontario

Ontario provincial by-election, May 2, 2024: Milton Resignation of Parm Gill
Party	Candidate	Votes	%	±%
Progressive Conservative	Zee Hamid	12,880	47.04	+3.97
Liberal	Galen Naidoo Harris	10,473	38.25	–0.50
New Democratic	Edie Strachan	1,851	6.76	–2.94
New Blue	John Spina	1,102	4.02	–0.03
Green	Kyle Hutton	755	2.76	–1.38
Ontario Party	Frederick Weening	111	0.41	–
Family Rights	Tony Walton	101	0.37	–
Independent	John Turmel	64	0.23	–
Independent	Arabella Vida	42	0.15	–
Total valid votes		27,379	99.74	
Total rejected, unmarked and declined ballots		72	0.26	–0.33
Turnout		27,451	27.53	–15.17
Eligible voters		99,705		
Progressive Conservative hold		Swing		+2.24
Source: Elections Ontario

2022 Milton mayoral election
Candidate	Votes	%
Gordon Krantz	11,391	49.51
Zee Hamid	10,396	45.18
Rajiv Dhawan	625	2.72
Saba Ishaq	597	2.59
Total	23,009	100.00

2018 Milton ward 4 regional election
Candidate	Votes	%
Zee Hamid	2,100	54.47
Sammy Ijaz	687	17.82
John Pollard	548	14.22
Tony Lambert	321	8.33
David Hertzman	199	5.61
Total	3,855	100.00

== Personal life ==
Hamid and his wife have a blended family of six children.
