= Milton (provincial electoral district) =

Provincial electoral district in Ontario, Canada

Coordinates: 43.512°N 79.886°W

Ontario electoral district
- Milton in relation to nearby electoral districts

Provincial electoral district
- Legislature: Legislative Assembly of Ontario
MPP
Zee Hamid
Progressive Conservative
- District created: 2015
- First contested: 2018
- Last contested: 2025

Demographics
- Population (2021): 136,993
- Electors (2018): 78,764
- Area (km²): 450
- Pop. density (per km²): 304.4
- Census division: Halton
- Census subdivision(s): Burlington, Milton

Milton is a provincial electoral district in Ontario, Canada. It elects one member to the Legislative Assembly of Ontario. The riding was created in 2015.

The riding is coterminous with the former federal electoral district of the same name. It consists of all of Milton plus the city of Burlington north of Dundas Street and Highway 407.

== Profile ==
The electoral district in its current form consists of the part of Burlington north of Dundas Street and Highway 407 and the town of Milton. The eponymous town, which makes up much of the riding's area, is a quickly growing settlement which dates back to the 1820s. According to the 2016 census, the riding population grew over six times as much as the Ontario average between 2011 and 2016, from 88,065 to 114,093 (a 29.6% increase compared to the provincial average of 4.6%). Over a third of the riding's population are immigrants. In 2015, the median income in the riding was $42,779, up from $41,801 in 2010. The median age in the district is 36, below the Ontario average of 41.

== Demographics ==
According to the 2021 Canadian census, 2013 representation

Languages: 56.3% English, 9.4% Urdu, 4% Arabic, 2.3% Spanish, 1.8% Punjabi, 1.5% Tagalog, 1.3% Polish, 1.2% Portuguese, 1.1% French, 1.1% Hindi, 1.1% Mandarin
Religions: 48.4% Christian (27.9% Catholic, 3.1% Christian Orthodox, 2.6% Anglican, 2% United Church, 1.4% Pentecostal, 1.1% Presbyterian), 22.6% Muslim, 19.4% no religion, 5.9% Hindu, 2.4% Sikh
Median income (2020): $46,000
Average income (2020): $60,000

Ethnicity groups: White: 45.3%, South Asian: 27.6%, Black: 5.7%, Arab: 5.6%, Filipino: 3.9%, Chinese: 2.8%, Latin American: 2.5%, West Asian: 1.3%, Southeast Asian: 1%

Ethnic origins: Pakistani 11.9%, English 11.5%, Indian 10.6%, Scottish 9.6%, Irish 9.2%, Canadian 8.9%, Italian 5.8%, German 4.7%, Filipino 4%, Portuguese 3.9%

== Members of Provincial Parliament ==
Milton
Assembly	Years	Member	Party
Riding created from Halton
42nd	2018–2022	Parm Gill	Progressive Conservative
43rd	2022–2024	Parm Gill	Progressive Conservative
43rd	2024–2025	Zee Hamid	Progressive Conservative
44th	2025–present	Zee Hamid	Progressive Conservative

== Election results ==
Winning party in each polling division of Milton at the 2025 Ontario general election

2025 Ontario general election
Party	Candidate	Votes	%	±%
Progressive Conservative	Zee Hamid	20,091	47.43	+0.39
Liberal	Kristina Tesser Derksen	17,551	41.44	+3.18
New Democratic	Katherine-Anne Cirlincione	2,403	5.67	–1.09
Green	Susan Doyle	1,130	2.67	–0.09
New Blue	John Spina	866	2.04	–1.98
Centrist	Mohsin Rizvi	316	0.75	–
Total valid votes		42,357	99.45	
Total rejected, unmarked and declined ballots		235	0.55	+0.29
Turnout		42,592	41.98	+14.45
Eligible voters		101,453		
Progressive Conservative hold		Swing		–1.40
Source: Elections Ontario

Ontario provincial by-election, May 2, 2024 Resignation of Parm Gill
Party	Candidate	Votes	%	±%
Progressive Conservative	Zee Hamid	12,880	47.04	+3.97
Liberal	Galen Naidoo Harris	10,473	38.25	–0.50
New Democratic	Edie Strachan	1,851	6.76	–2.94
New Blue	John Spina	1,102	4.02	–0.03
Green	Kyle Hutton	755	2.76	–1.38
Ontario Party	Frederick Weening	111	0.41	–
Family Rights	Tony Walton	101	0.37	–
Independent	John Turmel	64	0.23	–
Independent	Arabella Vida	42	0.15	–
Total valid votes		27,379	99.74	
Total rejected, unmarked and declined ballots		72	0.26	–0.33
Turnout		27,451	27.53	–15.17
Eligible voters		99,705		
Progressive Conservative hold		Swing		+2.24
Source: Elections Ontario

|}

Winning party in each polling division of Milton at the 2022 Ontario general election

2022 Ontario general election
Party	Candidate	Votes	%	±%	Expenditures
Progressive Conservative	Parm Gill	16,766	43.07	+1.40	$47,201
Liberal	Sameera Ali	15,086	38.75	+8.92	$55,857
New Democratic	Katherine Cirlincione	3,777	9.70	–12.54	$21,161
Green	Oriana Knox	1,612	4.14	–0.88	$1,700
New Blue	John Spina	1,579	4.06	–	$9,745
Consensus Ontario	Masood Khan	107	0.27	–	none listed
Total valid votes		38,927	99.41		
Total rejected, unmarked and declined ballots		231	0.59	–0.32	
Turnout		39,158	42.70	–13.40	
Eligible voters		91,696			
Progressive Conservative hold		Swing		–3.76	
Source: Elections Ontario

2018 Ontario general election
Party	Candidate	Votes	%	±%	Expenditures
Progressive Conservative	Parm Gill	18,249	41.67	+4.12	$58,739
Liberal	Indira Naidoo-Harris	13,064	29.83	–13.26	$49,410
New Democratic	Brendan Smyth	9,740	22.24	+7.83	$370
Green	Eleanor Hayward	2,200	5.02	+1.44	$81
Libertarian	Benjamin Cunningham	366	0.84	–	none listed
Social Reform	Enam Ahmed	170	0.39	–	none listed
Total valid votes		43,789	99.09		
Total rejected, unmarked and declined ballots		403	0.91		
Turnout		44,192	56.11		
Eligible voters		78,764			
Progressive Conservative notional gain from Liberal		Swing		+8.69	
Source: Elections Ontario

^ Results are compared to redistributed results

2014 general election redistributed results
Party	Vote	%
Liberal	13,964	43.09
Progressive Conservative	12,171	37.56
New Democratic	4,672	14.42
Green	1,161	3.58
Others	437	1.35

== See also ==
- List of Ontario provincial electoral districts
- Canadian provincial electoral districts
