= 2024 Milton provincial by-election =

Provincial by-election in Ontario, Canada

- May 2, 2024

Riding of Milton
- Turnout: 27.72% (▼14.99)
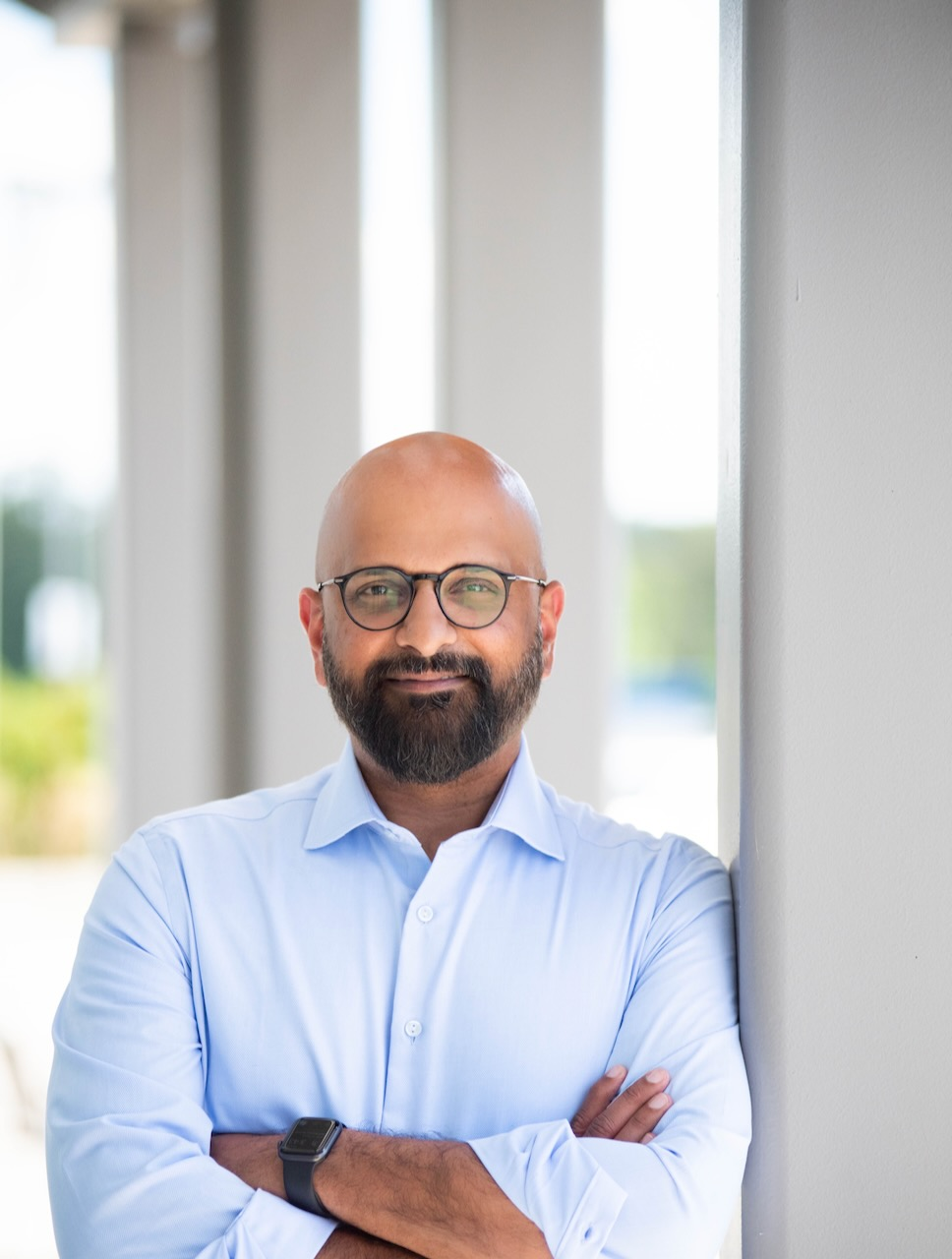
	First party	Second party	Third party
		LIB	NDP
Candidate	Zee Hamid	Galen Naidoo Harris	Edie Strachan
Party	Progressive Conservative	Liberal	New Democratic
Last election	43.07%	38.75%	9.70%
Popular vote	12,880	10,473	1,851
Percentage	47.04%	38.25%	6.76%
Swing	▲3.97	▼0.51	▼2.94
MPP before election
Parm Gill
Progressive Conservative
Elected MPP
Zee Hamid
Progressive Conservative

A by-election was held in the provincial riding of Milton in Ontario on May 2, 2024, to elect a new member of the Legislative Assembly of Ontario following the resignation of Progressive Conservative MPP and cabinet minister Parm Gill in order to run in the 45th Canadian federal election.

It was held the same day as the 2024 Lambton—Kent—Middlesex provincial by-election.

== Candidates ==
- Progressive Conservative - Zee Hamid.
- Liberal - Galen Naidoo Harris, son of former Milton MPP Indira Naidoo-Harris, local resident and political staffer.
- NDP - Edie Strachan, public servant.
- Green - Kyle Hutton, community activist and data organizer, contested Burlington in 2022.
- New Blue - John Spina, former director in the electrical utility industry.
- Ontario Party - Frederick Weening, contested Algoma—Manitoulin in 2022.
- Family Rights - Tony Walton, leader of the Family Rights Party, entrepreneur, and Stop the New Sex-Ed Agenda candidate in the 2023 Scarborough—Guildwood provincial by-election.
- Independent - John Turmel, perennial candidate
- Independent - Arabella Vida, charity worker.

== Polling ==
Polling firm	Last date of polling	Source	PC	Liberal	NDP	Green	Other	Margin of error	Sample size	Polling type	Lead
Liaison Strategies	April 25, 2024		39%	41%	9%	5%	6%	±4.71%	433	IVR	2%
Mainstreet Research	April 18, 2024		43%	43%	6%	6%	3%	±5.3%	348	Telephone	Tie
Liaison Strategies	March 28, 2024		39%	39%	10%	5%	6%	±4.62%	451	IVR	Tie

== Results ==
Ontario provincial by-election, May 2, 2024: Milton Resignation of Parm Gill
Party	Candidate	Votes	%	±%
Progressive Conservative	Zee Hamid	12,880	47.04	+3.97
Liberal	Galen Naidoo Harris	10,473	38.25	–0.50
New Democratic	Edie Strachan	1,851	6.76	–2.94
New Blue	John Spina	1,102	4.02	–0.03
Green	Kyle Hutton	755	2.76	–1.38
Ontario Party	Frederick Weening	111	0.41	–
Family Rights	Tony Walton	101	0.37	–
Independent	John Turmel	64	0.23	–
Independent	Arabella Vida	42	0.15	–
Total valid votes		27,379	99.74	
Total rejected, unmarked and declined ballots		72	0.26	–0.33
Turnout		27,451	27.53	–15.17
Eligible voters		99,705		
Progressive Conservative hold		Swing		+2.24
Source: Elections Ontario

== See also ==
- 2024 Lambton—Kent—Middlesex provincial by-election
- List of Ontario by-elections
