= Parm Gill =

Canadian politician (born 1974)

The Honourable Parm Gill ECO
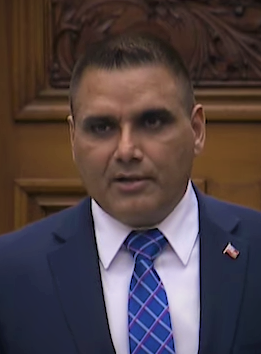
- Gill in 2020

Minister of Red Tape Reduction
- In office June 24, 2022 – January 26, 2024
- Premier: Doug Ford
- Preceded by: Nina Tangri (Associate Ministry of Small Business and Red Tape Reduction)
- Succeeded by: Andrea Khanjin

Minister of Citizenship and Multiculturalism
- In office June 18, 2021 – June 24, 2022
- Premier: Doug Ford
- Succeeded by: Michael Ford

Member of the Ontario Provincial Parliament for Milton
- In office June 7, 2018 – February 16, 2024
- Preceded by: Indira Naidoo-Harris
- Succeeded by: Zee Hamid

Member of Parliament for Brampton—Springdale
- In office May 2, 2011 – August 4, 2015
- Preceded by: Ruby Dhalla
- Succeeded by: Constituency abolished

Personal details
- Born: Paramjit Gill; May 17, 1974 (age 52) Moga district, Punjab, India
- Party: Conservative (federal); Progressive Conservative Party of Ontario (provincial)
- Profession: Entrepreneur

Parm Gill ECO (born May 17, 1974) is a Canadian politician. He represented the riding of Milton in the Legislative Assembly of Ontario between 2018 and 2024.

As a member of the Conservative Party, he previously represented the riding of Brampton—Springdale in Ontario in the House of Commons of Canada from 2011 to 2015, holding roles as parliamentary secretary to the Minister of Veterans Affairs and the Minister of International Trade from 2013 until his defeat in the 2015 federal election. In the 2025 Canadian federal election, he ran and was defeated in riding of Milton East—Halton Hills South riding.

He was elected to the provincial legislature, representing Milton for the Progressive Conservative Party of Ontario, in the 2018 provincial election. In 2021, he was elevated to the Cabinet as the Minister for Citizenship and Multiculturalism, and became the Minister of Red Tape Reduction in 2022. In January 2024, he announced his departure from provincial politics to run for the Conservatives in the 45th Canadian federal election.

== Early life ==
Gill was born on May 17, 1974, in Moga, Punjab in India. He moved to Canada at a young age.

Before politics, he was an entrepreneur and business executive. He worked on his family's businesses, which include a furniture manufacturing factory and some restaurants that he operated with his older brother.

== Political career ==
In the 2006 federal election, Gill ran in York West, and lost to Liberal MP Judy Sgro by over 15000 votes. In the 2008 federal election, Gill ran in Brampton—Springdale against incumbent Ruby Dhalla, but was narrowly defeated by 773 votes. The election campaign between the two were heated, and during an all-candidates' debate, Dhalla brought up how Gill's brother had been charged with vandalizing her campaign signs in 2006, even though the charges were dropped, and Gill attacked Dhalla for failing to do enough for a boy beaten by police in India after stealing her aide's purse.

He was elected as a Conservative Party of Canada Member of Parliament representing Brampton Springdale in the 2011 election, defeating Dhalla.

After witnessing increased gang activity in his riding, Gill toured Western Canadian cities in December 2011 to speak with police and community organizations to see how this could be stopped. In May 2012, Gill introduced a private members bill, C-394, which made it a crime to target someone for recruitment into a gang. It was eventually passed into law in June 2014.

In September 2013, Gill was appointed Parliamentary Secretary to the Minister of Veterans Affairs. During Rob Ford's drug scandal, Gill was one of the few federal politicians to offer support for the embattled mayor, calling him a "great mayor" who was "doing a wonderful job" in November 2013, and claimed that Torontonians were happy with his record.

In January 2015, Gill was appointed by Prime Minister Stephen Harper to the role of a Parliamentary Secretary to the Minister of International Trade. In May 2015, Gill wrote letters of support to the Canadian Radio-television and Telecommunications Commission (CRTC) for two of his constituents' competing applications for a community radio station in Brampton. The Conflict of Interest Act bars parliamentary secretaries from writing such letters to the CRTC and other administrative tribunals, and in October 2013, ethics commissioner Mary Dawson had issued a directive to that effect. The Ethics Commissioner ruled in February 2016 that although he had acted in good faith, Gill had violated the Conflict of Interest Act.

=== 2015 election ===
Redistribution of federal ridings took place and concluded shortly before the 2015 federal election. Gill's riding, Brampton-Springdale, was eliminated, and he ran in the new riding of Brampton North.

In August 2015, HuffPost reported that a supporter of Gill's who previously bundled donations to Liberal MP Jim Karygiannis, had switched his allegiance and had induced Liberal supporters into donating to Gill without their consent. In October 2015, a week and a half before voting day, it was reported that the commissioner of Elections Canada launched an investigation into these claims.

During the election, Gill criticized the provincial Ontario Liberal Party and Premier Kathleen Wynne's proposed updates to the sexual education curriculum, which had not been changed since 1998. The changes included teaching that homosexuality was acceptable in Grade 3, teaching about puberty in Grade 4 as opposed to Grade 5, and teaching about masturbation and gender expression in Grade 6. Gill described the changes as "graphic and explicit" in a taxpayer-funded mailout which conflated the provincial party's education policies with those of separate federal Liberal party, which has no constitutional jurisdiction in the field. In the mailout, Gill also said that it was part of a Liberal attack on family values and parent's right to control the education of their children. In a 2015 video with the Punjabi Post, Gill described some segments of the new education curriculum as "disgusting."

Gill lost to Liberal candidate Ruby Sahota.

=== Provincial politics ===
On October 29, 2016, Gill announced that he would seek the Progressive Conservative Party of Ontario nomination in Milton for the 42nd Ontario general election. On June 18, 2017, he won the nomination. In June 2017, then Progressive Conservative leader Patrick Brown stated that Gill's position on gay rights had shifted, and he was now "100 per cent" in favour of gay rights after comments stating that Gill said that he became involved in politics due to his opposition to legalizing same-sex marriage were uncovered.

On June 7, 2018 Gill won the Ontario general election in the riding of Milton as a member of the Progressive Conservatives. In 2021, he was appointed the Ontario Minister for Citizenship and Multiculturalism from 2021 to 2022, when he became the Minister of Red Tape Reduction. Gill officially resigned as MPP on February 16, 2024. The provincial by-election to replace him was held on May 2, 2024. The seat was retained by the Progressive Conservatives.

=== 45th Canadian federal election ===
On January 25, 2024, Gill announced that he would be resigning as a Minister and MPP to run in the 45th Canadian federal election in Milton. He was acclaimed as the Conservative candidate despite an allegations that he misled a prospective candidate, D'Arcy Keene, a Georgetown town Councillor, about running. After the riding was split into Burlington North—Milton West, and Milton East—Halton Hills South, Gill planned to seek a seat in Milton East—Halton Hills South. Keene, who ran tried running in the nomination for Milton East—Halton Hills South, never received nomination papers and suggested this was because the party preferred Gill as their candidate.

Gill was defeated in the 2025 election. Although preliminary results suggested he had narrowly won the riding, a subsequent vote validation process by Elections Canada revealed that Liberal candidate Kristina Tesser Derksen had won the seat by a margin of 29 votes, overturning Gill's initial lead. Because of the narrow margin, a judicial recount was automatically triggered. Following a three-day recount, Tesser Derksen's victory was confirmed with a revised margin of 21 votes.

== Personal life ==
Gill and his wife Amarpal have three children.

At the time of the 2025 Canadian federal election, he lived in Milton, Ontario.

== Electoral record ==
2025 Canadian federal election: Milton East—Halton Hills South
Party	Candidate	Votes	%	±%	Expenditures
Liberal	Kristina Tesser Derksen	32,178	48.25	+6.54	$128,386.69
Conservative	Parm Gill	32,157	48.22	+6.97	$132,146.27
New Democratic	Muhammad Riaz Sahi	1,029	1.54	–8.03	$0.00
Green	Susan Doyle	672	1.01	–1.59	$0.00
People's	Walter J. Hofman	475	0.71	–4.17	$9,990.04
Independent	Shahbaz Mahmood Khan	174	0.26	N/A	$2,739.15
Total valid votes/expense limit		66,685	99.51	–	$135,890.29
Total rejected ballots		328	0.49		
Turnout		67,013	74.18		
Eligible voters		90,340			
Liberal notional hold		Swing		–0.21	
Source: Elections Canada
Notes: This riding's results were subject to an automatic judicial recount on May 9, 2025. Number of eligible voters does not include election day registrations.

2022 Ontario general election: Milton
Party	Candidate	Votes	%	±%	Expenditures
Progressive Conservative	Parm Gill	16,766	43.07	+1.40	$47,201
Liberal	Sameera Ali	15,086	38.75	+8.92	$55,857
New Democratic	Katherine Cirlincione	3,777	9.70	–12.54	$21,161
Green	Oriana Knox	1,612	4.14	–0.88	$1,700
New Blue	John Spina	1,579	4.06	–	$9,745
Consensus Ontario	Masood Khan	107	0.27	–	none listed
Total valid votes		38,927	99.41		
Total rejected, unmarked and declined ballots		231	0.59	–0.32	
Turnout		39,158	42.70	–13.40	
Eligible voters		91,696			
Progressive Conservative hold		Swing		▼3.76	
Source: Elections Ontario

2018 Ontario general election: Milton
Party	Candidate	Votes	%	±%	Expenditures
Progressive Conservative	Parm Gill	18,249	41.67	+4.12	$58,739
Liberal	Indira Naidoo-Harris	13,064	29.83	–13.26	$49,410
New Democratic	Brendan Smyth	9,740	22.24	+7.83	$370
Green	Eleanor Hayward	2,200	5.02	+1.44	$81
Libertarian	Benjamin Cunningham	366	0.84	–	none listed
Social Reform	Enam Ahmed	170	0.39	–	none listed
Total valid votes		43,789	99.09		
Total rejected, unmarked and declined ballots		403	0.91		
Turnout		44,192	56.11		
Eligible voters		78,764			
Progressive Conservative notional gain from Liberal		Swing		▲8.69	
Source: Elections Ontario

2015 Canadian federal election: Brampton North
Party	Candidate	Votes	%	±%	Expenditures
Liberal	Ruby Sahota	23,297	48.37	+20.21	$136,386.70
Conservative	Parm Gill	15,888	32.99	-15.88	$194,312.26
New Democratic	Martin Singh	7,946	16.50	-2.34	$78,854.84
Green	Pauline Thornham	915	1.90	-1.78	$146.44
Communist	Harinderpal Hundal	120	0.25	–	–
Total valid votes/Expense limit		48,166	100.00		$206,076.29
Total rejected ballots		318	0.66	–	
Turnout		48,484	66.13	–	
Eligible voters		73,321			
Liberal notional gain from Conservative		Swing		+18.05	
Source: Elections Canada

2011 Canadian federal election
Party	Candidate	Votes	%	±%	Expenditures
Conservative	Parm Gill	24,617	48.3%	–	–
Liberal	Ruby Dhalla	14,231	27.9%	–	–
New Democratic	Manjit Grewal	9,963	19.6%	–	–
Green	Mark Hoffberg	1,926	3.8%	–	–
Communist	Liz Rowley	219	0.4%	–	–
Total valid votes		50,956	100.0%	–	

2008 Canadian federal election: Brampton—Springdale
Party	Candidate	Votes	%	±%	Expenditures
Liberal	Ruby Dhalla	18,577	41.03	−6.3	$80,011
Conservative	Parm Gill	17,804	39.32	+5.5	$86,444
New Democratic	Mani Singh	5,238	11.57	−6.1	$21,152
Green	Dave Finlay	3,516	7.76	+3.9	$746
Communist	Dimitrios Kabitsis	135	0.29	+0.1	$407
Total valid votes/expense limit		45,270	100.0	–	$87,594
Total rejected ballots		419	0.92		
Turnout		45,689	54.24	−7.0	
Electors on the lists		84,239			

2006 Canadian federal election: York West
Party	Candidate	Votes	%	Expenditures
Liberal	Judy Sgro	21,418	63.78	$48,741.93
Conservative	Parm Gill	6,244	18.59	$71,005.65
New Democratic	Sandra Romano Anthony	4,724	14.07	$8,845.73
Green	Nick Capra	1,002	2.98	$1,692.18
Independent	Axcel Cocon	192	0.57	$1,801.61
Total valid votes		33,580	100.00	
Total rejected ballots		261		
Turnout		33,841	57.90	
Electors on the lists		58,450		
