= Ontario Liberal Party Shadow Cabinet of the 44th Legislative Assembly of Ontario =

Liberal Shadow Cabinet of the 44th Parliament of Ontario
- Shadow Cabinet of Ontario
- 2025–present
- Date formed: March 21, 2025

People and organisations
- Party Leader: Bonnie Crombie (Note: Because Bonnie Crombie does not hold a seat in the Legislative Assembly, she appointed John Fraser (the MPP for Ottawa South) to be the Liberal's parliamentary leader in her absence.)
- Parliamentary Leader: John Fraser
- House Leader: Lucille Collard
- Member party: Liberal
- Status in legislature: Third party opposition 14 / 124 (11%)

History
- Election: 2025
- Legislature term: 44th Provincial Parliament

The Ontario Liberal Party Shadow Cabinet for the 44th Legislative Assembly of Ontario was announced on March 21, 2025.

Critic	Riding	Portfolio	Duration
Rob Cerjanec	Ajax	Economic Development and Innovation	2025-present
Rob Cerjanec	Ajax	Tourism, Sport and Culture	2025-present
Mary-Margaret McMahon	Beaches—East York	Environment and Climate	2025-present
Mary-Margaret McMahon	Beaches—East York	Emergency Management	2025-present
Adil Shamji	Don Valley East	Chief Whip	2025-present
Adil Shamji	Don Valley East	Housing	2025-present
Adil Shamji	Don Valley East	Primary Care, Urgent Care and Public Health	2025-present
Adil Shamji	Don Valley East	Indigenous Affairs	2025-present
Jonathan Tsao	Don Valley North	Citizenship and Immigration	2025-present
Jonathan Tsao	Don Valley North	Community, Social Services, Children and Youth	2025-present
Stephanie Bowman	Don Valley West	Deputy House Leader	2025-present
Stephanie Bowman	Don Valley West	Finance	2025-present
Stephanie Bowman	Don Valley West	Treasury Board	2025-present
Stephanie Bowman	Don Valley West	Interprovincial Trade, Tariffs and International Trade	2025-present
Lee Fairclough	Etobicoke—Lakeshore	Hospitals, Mental Health, Addictions and Homelessness	2025-present
Karen McCrimmon	Kanata—Carleton	Public Safety, Cybersecurity and Crime Prevention, Solicitor General	2025-present
Ted Hsu	Kingston and the Islands	Energy and Mining	2025-present
Ted Hsu	Kingston and the Islands	Natural Resources and Forestry	2025-present
Ted Hsu	Kingston and the Islands	Agriculture and Rural Issues	2025-present
Tyler Watt	Nepean	Training, Colleges and Universities	2025-present
Tyler Watt	Nepean	Long Term Care	2025-present
Stephen Blais	Orléans	Caucus Chair	2025-present
Stephen Blais	Orléans	Infrastructure	2025-present
Stephen Blais	Orléans	Municipalities	2025-present
Stephen Blais	Orléans	Government Services and Procurement	2025-present
Stephen Blais	Orléans	Red Tape Reduction	2025-present
John Fraser	Ottawa South	Leader in the Legislature	2025-present
John Fraser	Ottawa South	Labour	2025-present
John Fraser	Ottawa South	Education	2025-present
Lucille Collard	Ottawa—Vanier	House leader	2025-present
Lucille Collard	Ottawa—Vanier	Attorney General	2025-present
Lucille Collard	Ottawa—Vanier	Francophone Affairs, and French Language Education	2025-present
Andrea Hazell	Scarborough—Guildwood	Transportation	2025-present
Andrea Hazell	Scarborough—Guildwood	Small Business	2025-present
Andrea Hazell	Scarborough—Guildwood	Women	2025-present
Stephanie Smyth	Toronto—St. Paul's	Deputy Whip	2025-present
Stephanie Smyth	Toronto—St. Paul's	Ethics, Integrity and Accountability	2025-present
Stephanie Smyth	Toronto—St. Paul's	Northern Affairs	2025-present
Stephanie Smyth	Toronto—St. Paul's	Seniors and Accessibility	2025-present

== See also ==
- Executive Council of Ontario
- Official Opposition Shadow Cabinet of the 44th Legislative Assembly of Ontario
