= Patrice Barnes =

Canadian politician

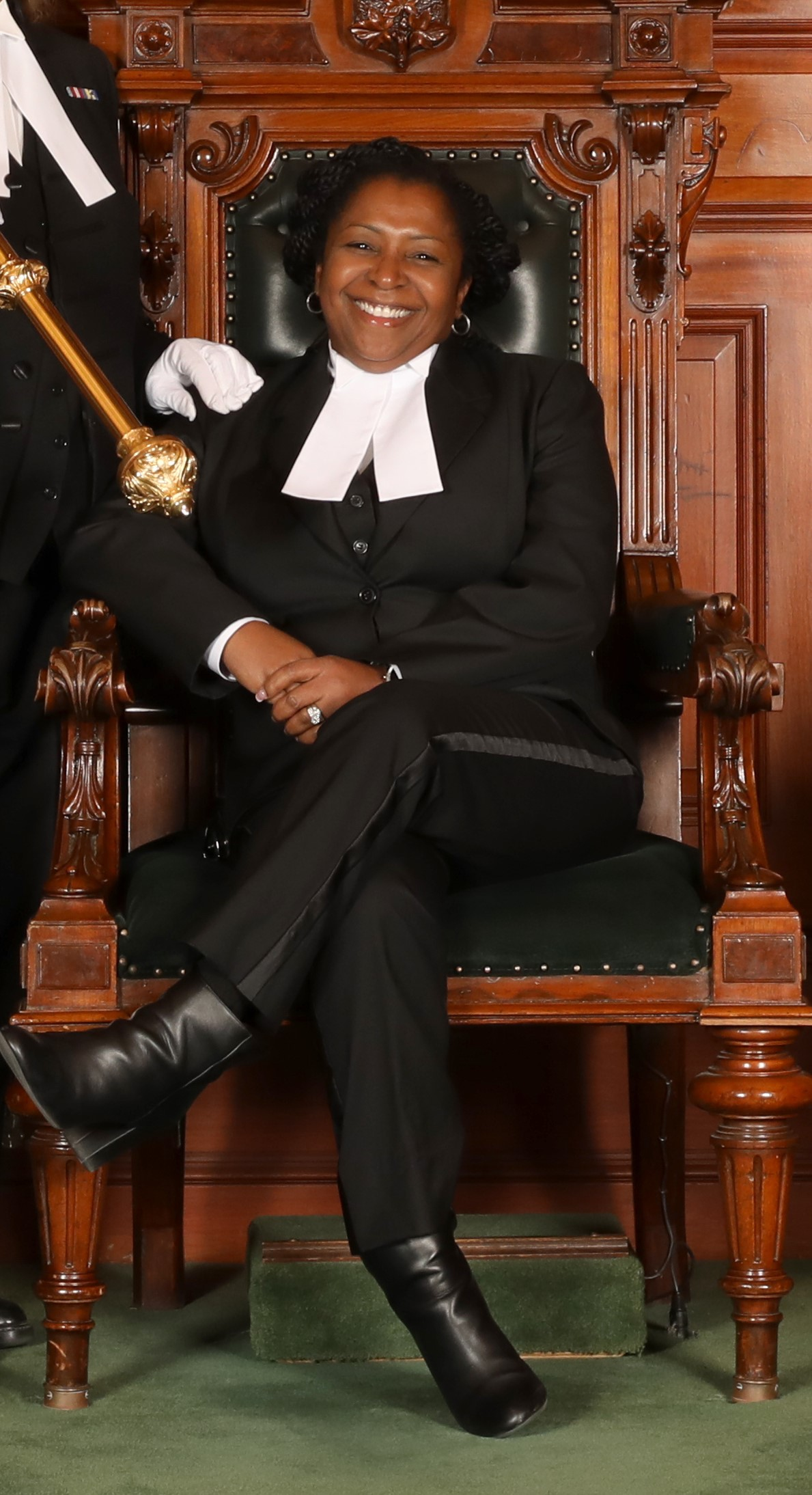
- Barnes as deputy speaker.

Member of the Ontario Provincial Parliament for Ajax
- In office June 2, 2022 – January 28, 2025
- Preceded by: Rod Phillips
- Succeeded by: Rob Cerjanec

Personal details
- Born: Jamaica
- Party: Progressive Conservative

Patrice Barnes is a Canadian politician and former school trustee who served as a member of the Legislative Assembly of Ontario (MPP) from 2022 to 2025. A member of the Progressive Conservative Party of Ontario, she represented the riding of Ajax.

== Political career ==
Barnes was first elected in the 2022 Ontario general election and was appointed deputy speaker in 2023.

In the 2025 general election, Barnes lost reelection to Ontario Liberal candidate Rob Cerjanec by 0.8% of the vote.

== Electoral history ==
2025 Ontario general election: Ajax
Party	Candidate	Votes	%	±%
Liberal	Rob Cerjanec	18,499	44.96	+8.98
Progressive Conservative	Patrice Barnes	18,168	44.16	+3.47
New Democratic	Arthur Augustine	2,884	7.01	–9.68
Green	Cory Feferman	866	2.10	–1.36
New Blue	Chris Rees	413	1.00	–0.65
Centrist	Sarah Qureshi	312	0.76	–
Total valid votes		41,142	99.64	
Total rejected, unmarked and declined ballots		148	0.36	–0.19
Turnout		41,290	41.56	+1.60
Eligible voters		99,349		
Liberal gain from Progressive Conservative		Swing		▲2.76
Source: Elections Ontario

2022 Ontario general election: Ajax
Party	Candidate	Votes	%	±%
Progressive Conservative	Patrice Barnes	15,336	40.69	+1.65
Liberal	Amber Bowen	13,561	35.98	+10.18
New Democratic	Christine Santos	6,291	16.69	–14.27
Green	Neil Runnalls	1,305	3.46	+0.96
New Blue	Garry Reader	625	1.66	–
Ontario Party	Aaron Hopkins	330	0.88	–
Independent	Intab Ali	127	0.34	–
Independent	Allen Hadley	112	0.30	–
Total valid votes		37,687	99.45	
Total rejected, unmarked and declined ballots		209	0.55	–0.30
Turnout		37,896	39.96	–14.67
Eligible voters		94,835		
Progressive Conservative hold		Swing		▼4.27
Source: Elections Ontario
