= Section 71 of the Constitution Act, 1867 =

Provision of the Constitution of Canada

British North America Act, 1867

Section 71 of the Constitution Act, 1867 (French: Article 71 de la Loi constitutionnelle de 1867) is a provision of the Constitution of Canada creating the Legislature of the province of Quebec, which did not exist prior to 1867. The Constitution Act, 1867 created Quebec, including the institutions of the new provincial government, such as the Legislature.

The Legislature was originally bicameral, consisting of the Lieutenant Governor of Quebec, the appointed Legislative Council, and the elected Legislative Assembly. The Legislative Council was abolished in 1969 and the Legislative Assembly was renamed the National Assembly of Québec. In 1982, the Legislature renamed itself the Parliament of Québec. Quebec operates on the Westminster parliamentary system of responsible government, with the government drawn from, and responsible to, the National Assembly.

The Constitution Act, 1867 is the constitutional statute which established Canada. Originally named the British North America Act, 1867, the Act continues to be the foundational statute for the Constitution of Canada, although it has been amended many times since 1867. It is now recognised as part of the supreme law of Canada.

== Constitution Act, 1867 ==
The Constitution Act, 1867 is part of the Constitution of Canada and thus part of the supreme law of Canada. The Act sets out the constitutional framework of Canada, including the structure of the federal government and the powers of the federal government and the provinces. It was the product of extensive negotiations between the provinces of British North America at the Charlottetown Conference in 1864, the Quebec Conference in 1864, and the London Conference in 1866. Those conferences were followed by consultations with the British government in 1867. The Act was then enacted by the British Parliament under the name the British North America Act, 1867. In 1982 the Act was brought under full Canadian control through the Patriation of the Constitution, and was renamed the Constitution Act, 1867. Since Patriation, the Act can only be amended in Canada, under the amending formula set out in the Constitution Act, 1982.

== Text of section 71 ==
Section 71 reads:

Legislature for Quebec
71 There shall be a Legislature for Quebec consisting of the Lieutenant Governor and of Two Houses, styled the Legislative Council of Quebec and the Legislative Assembly of Quebec.

Section 71 is found in Part V of the Constitution Act, 1867, dealing with provincial constitutions. It has been amended twice by the Legislature of Quebec. In 1969, the Legislature abolished the Legislative Council and renamed the Legislative Assembly as the National Assembly of Québec. In 1982, the Legislature renamed itself the Parliament of Québec. Those substantive amendments did not formally change the wording of s. 71.

== Legislative history ==
At the Quebec Conference, the Quebec Resolutions provided that the existing Province of Canada would be divided into two new provinces, Quebec and Ontario. The conference delegates left the constitutional structure of the two new provinces to the government of the Province of Canada to determine.

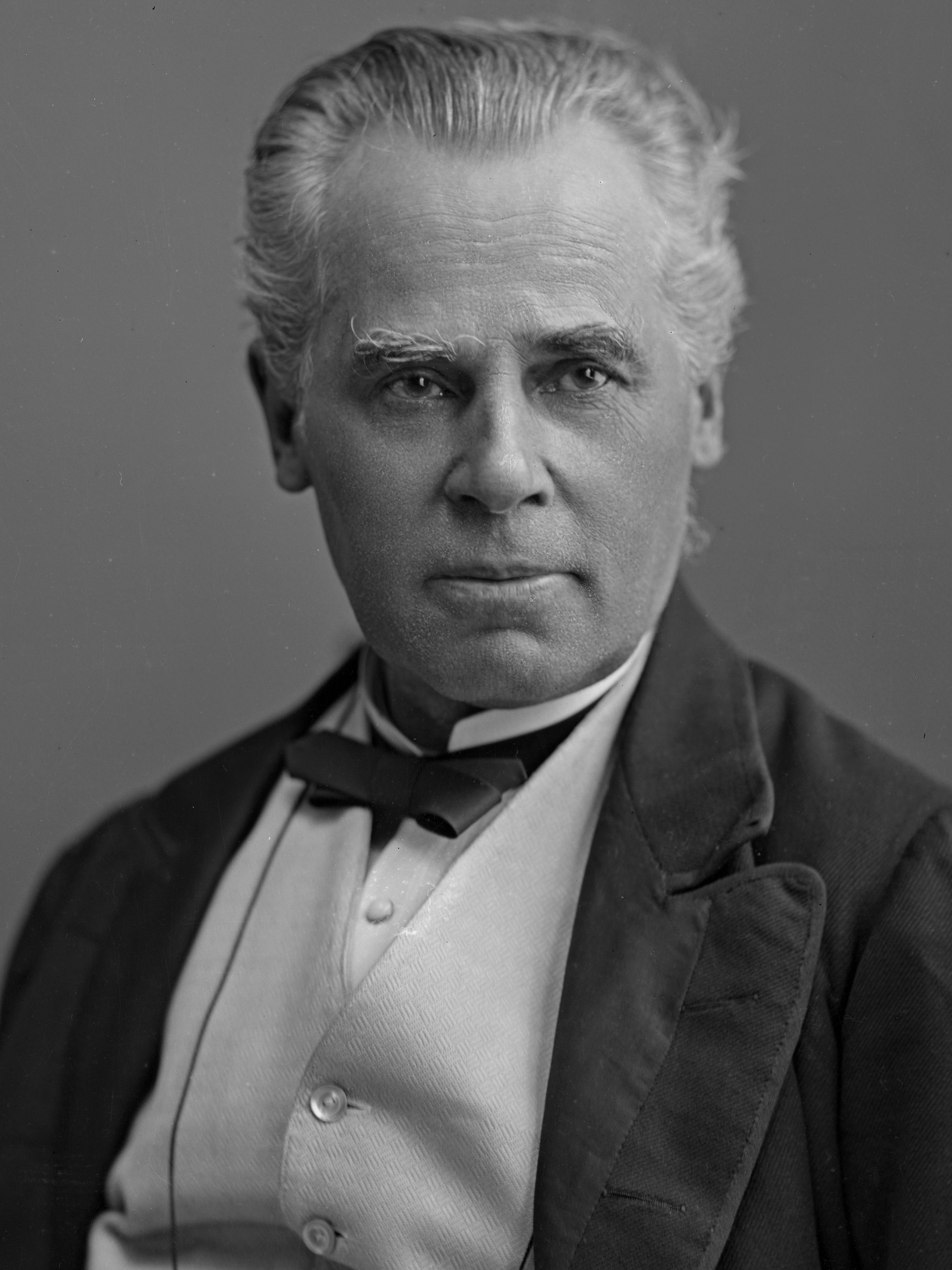
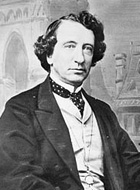
George-Étienne Cartier and John A. Macdonald, who introduced the resolutions for the provincial constitutions

In July 1866, the Parliament of the Province of Canada considered an additional set of resolutions, to set out the framework for the constitutions of the two new provinces. The additional resolutions were introduced in the Legislative Assembly on July 13, 1866, by the joint premiers, George-Étienne Cartier and John A. Macdonald. The fourth resolution provided that Lower Canada (the old name for what would become Quebec), would have a legislature composed of two chambers, a legislative council and a legislative assembly.

At the London Conference in December 1866, the delegates adopted the same approach as in the Quebec Resolutions: the local governments would be as determined by the Province of Canada.

The first rough draft of the British North America bill was then prepared by the four provincial attorneys general present at the London Conference. (Note: The four attorneys general were John A. Macdonald, Canada West; George-Étienne Cartier, Canada East; William Alexander Henry, Nova Scotia; and Charles Fisher, New Brunswick.) That draft simply provided that the provincial governments would be constituted by the provincial legislatures, "subject to the provisions of this act".

The initial draft prepared by the British drafter similarly did not deal with the details of the provincial constitutions. Instead, in referring to the provincial constitutions, there was a note to the draft which stated: "It is understood that Draft Clauses on these Subjects are being prepared by the Delegates of the several Colonies, which when completed can be considered in Consultation with them."

It was not until the third draft that provision was made for the legislature of Quebec, composed of two chambers, although the name had not yet been determined. The provision took final form in the fourth draft: the Legislature would consist of the lieutenant governor and two chambers, called the Legislative Council and the Legislative Assembly.

== Purpose and interpretation ==
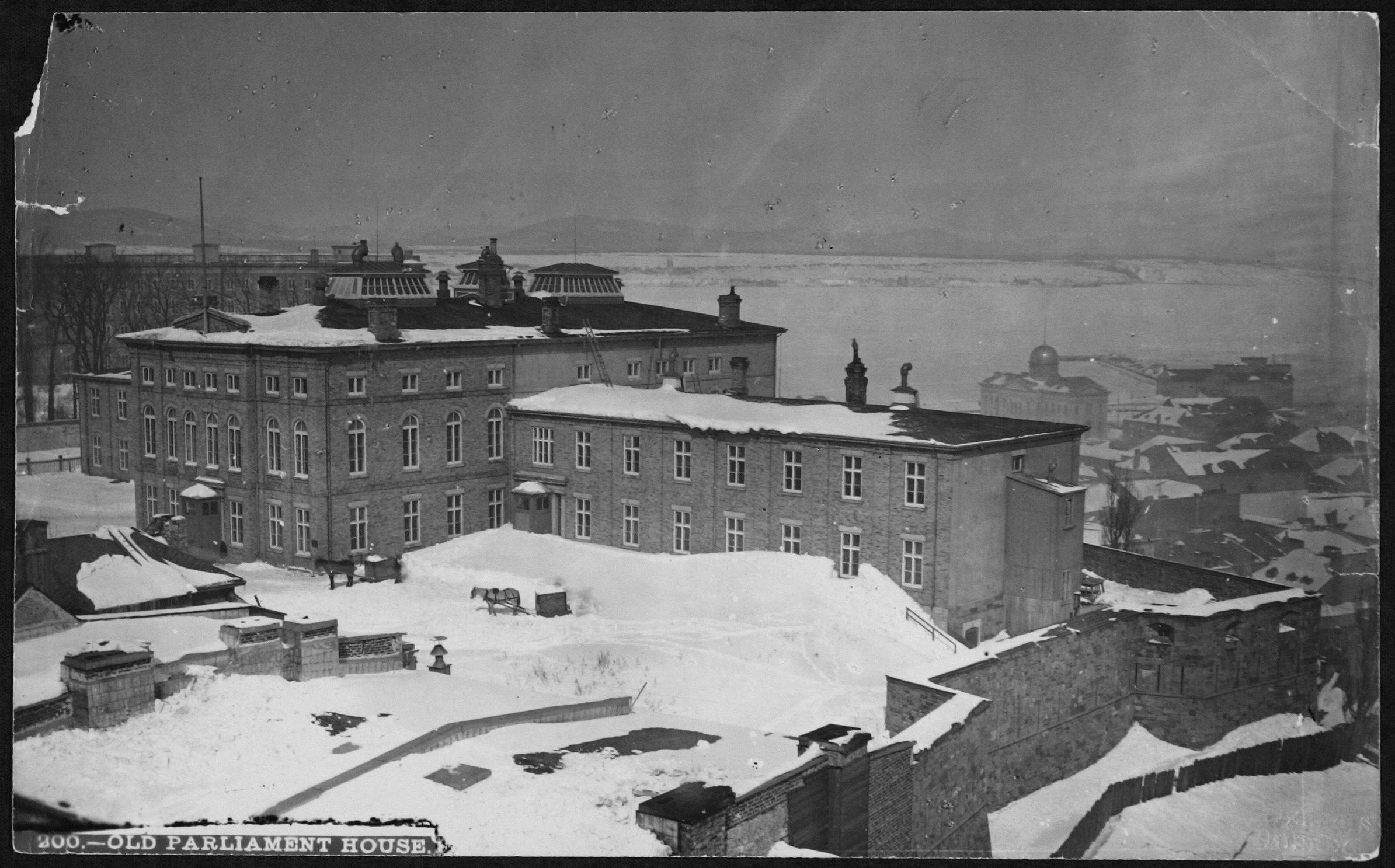
Parliament buildings in Quebec, used by the Parliament of the Province of Canada from 1859 to 1866, and then by the Legislature of Quebec from 1867 to 1883

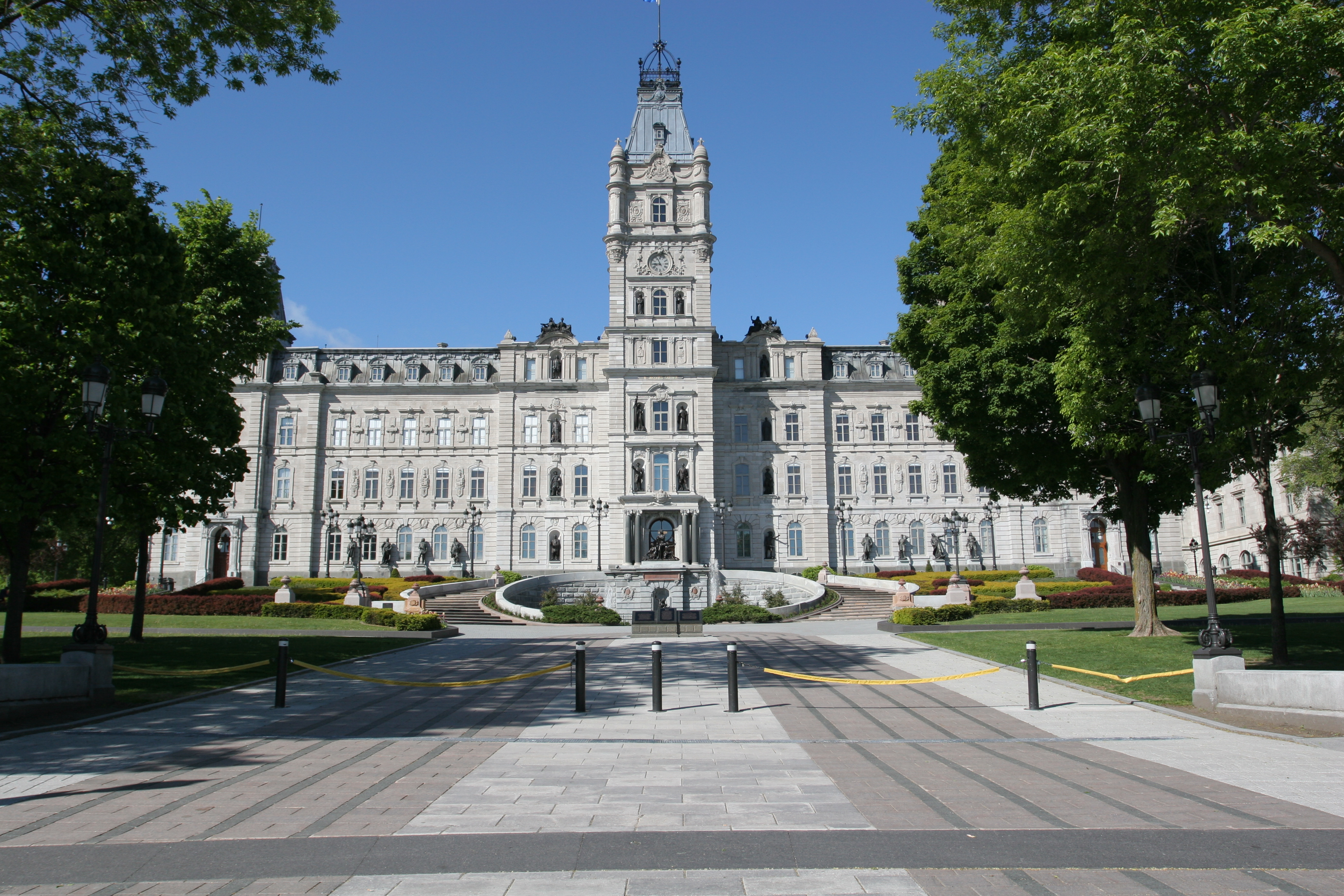
Parliament buildings of Quebec today

The province of Quebec did not exist prior to 1867. In 1841, the British government had merged Lower Canada and Upper Canada to form the Province of Canada. Twenty years later, in the negotiations leading to Confederation, the Canadians agreed from the start that the Province of Canada would be split into two separate provinces in the new federation. Each of the new provinces would need a completely new constitution, including a legislature, because the old Parliament of the Province of Canada would cease to exist.

The delegates at the Quebec Conference did not put a great deal of work into the constitutions of the provinces. Some of the delegates viewed the provinces as simply large municipalities, who would have much less power than the previous colonial provinces, while others thought they were continuations of the provinces. Ultimately, the delegates fell back on the well-known structure of the pre-Confederation governments, based on the fundamental principle of responsible government.

In the summer of 1866, the Legislative Assembly of the Province of Canada produced a series of resolutions to set out the constitutions of the two new provinces, Ontario and Quebec. There was a significant difference between the two: Quebec would have a bicameral legislature, while Ontario would have a unicameral legislature. Cartier, co-premier from Canada East, insisted on a bicameral legislature as being within the legislative traditions of British North America. A conservative Bleu, he also considered that an appointed upper house was closely linked to the principles of responsible government and monarchical institutions. Some Bleus believed that a bicameral legislature would provide greater protection for the province from the centralising tendencies of the federal government. There was also some suggestion that an appointed upper house could help protect the interests of the anglophone minority.

Accordingly, section 71 of the Act created the Legislature of Quebec as a bicameral legislature, consisting of the elected Legislative Assembly, the appointed Legislative Council, and the appointed Lieutenant Governor of Quebec, the representative of the Crown.

The Legislative Assembly originally had 65 seats, the same number of seats Canada East had held in the Legislative Assembly of the Province of Canada, and which was also the same as Quebec's representation in the new federal House of Commons. The Legislative Assembly also used the same electoral map as had been used in the Province of Canada Legislative Assembly and would be used initially in the House of Commons.

The Legislative Council had 24 seats, the same number which Canada East had held in the Legislative Council of the Province of Canada, and the same number which Quebec would have in the new Senate of Canada. The members of the Legislative Council of Quebec and the senators from Quebec were appointed to the same map of seats as had been used for the Legislative Council of the Province of Canada. The members of the new Legislative Council were appointed for life by the Lieutenant Governor of Quebec, acting on the advice of the provincial government.

The two houses had near-equal legislative authority. The only constitutional difference was that money bills relating to provincial finances had to originate in the Legislative Assembly. However, the Legislative Council had the power to reject money bills, could initiate any other type of legislation, and could amend or reject bills passed by the Legislative Assembly.

== Subsequent developments ==
=== Abolition of the Legislative Council ===
Although the Legislative Council had broad legislative powers, it rarely initiated legislation. It did, on occasion, obstruct passage of bills passed by the Legislative Assembly.

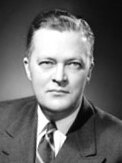
Premier Lesage, who tried unsuccessfully to abolish the Legislative Council

In the 1960s, when Premier Jean Lesage of the Quebec Liberal Party took office, the Union Nationale had a majority in the Legislative Council. Lesage warned the legislative councillors that if they obstructed passage of the Liberals' plan to nationalise the electrical system, he would consider legislation to abolish the Legislative Council. The legislative councillors duly passed the nationalisation measure.

Lesage later introduced legislation to reduce the Legislative Council's power to obstruct passage of bills passed by the Legislative Assembly, similar to the restrictions on the British House of Lords. However, the Legislative Council refused to pass the amendments. The Lesage government then passed a resolution in the Legislative Assembly requesting that the British Parliament amend the Constitution Act, 1867 to abolish the Legislative Council. The Legislative Council passed a counter resolution, opposing any change. The British government took no action on the issue.

When the Union Nationale returned to power, Premier Jean-Jacques Bertrand persuaded the legislative councillors to agree to the abolition of the Legislative Council in return for generous severance packages. The abolition took effect on December 31, 1968.

In passing the legislation abolishing the Legislative Council, the Bertrand government relied on section 92(1) of the Constitution Act, 1867, which gave the provincial legislatures the power to amend the provincial constitution. (Note: The provincial power to amend provincial constitutions is now found in section 45 of the Constitution Act, 1982.)

=== Renaming of the Legislative Assembly and the Legislature ===
The 1968 legislation abolishing the Legislative Council also changed the name of the Legislative Assembly. From 1968 onwards, the assembly is known as the National Assembly of Québec.

In 1982, there was a further change to nomenclature. The Legislature repealed the Legislature Act, replacing it with the new Act respecting the National Assembly. One of the changes made in that act was to rename the Legislature as the Parliament of Québec.

=== Comparison to other provinces ===
At Confederation in 1867, Ontario was the outlier, as the only province with a unicameral legislature. Quebec and the other two original provinces, Nova Scotia and New Brunswick, all had bicameral legislatures, as did the other two British North American colonies which had considered joining Confederation, Prince Edward Island and Newfoundland. When Manitoba was created three years later, it too had a bicameral legislature. By 1968, all those other provinces had abolished their upper houses; Quebec was the last to do so.

== Related provisions of the Constitution Act, 1867 ==
Section 6 of the act split the Province of Canada into the two new provinces, Ontario and Quebec.

Section 69 of the act created the Legislature of Ontario.

Section 72 of the act set the size of the Legislative Council at 24 members.

Section 80 of the act initially set the size of the Legislative Assembly at 65 members, subject to expansion by the province.

Section 81 of the Act provided that the Legislature was to be summoned no later than six months from the date the Constitution Act, 1867 came into force.

Section 82 of the Act provides that the Lieutenant Governor of Quebec has the power to summon the Legislative Assembly from time to time.

Section 83 of the Act prohibited individuals who hold provincial offices from sitting in the Legislative Assembly, other than the members of the Executive Council of Ontario.

Section 89 of the act provided the rules for the first provincial election, which was to be held at the same time as the first federal election.

Sections 92 to 95 of the Act set out the legislative authority of the provincial legislatures.
