= Rod Phillips (politician) =

Canadian politician and businessman

The Honourable Rod Phillips ECO
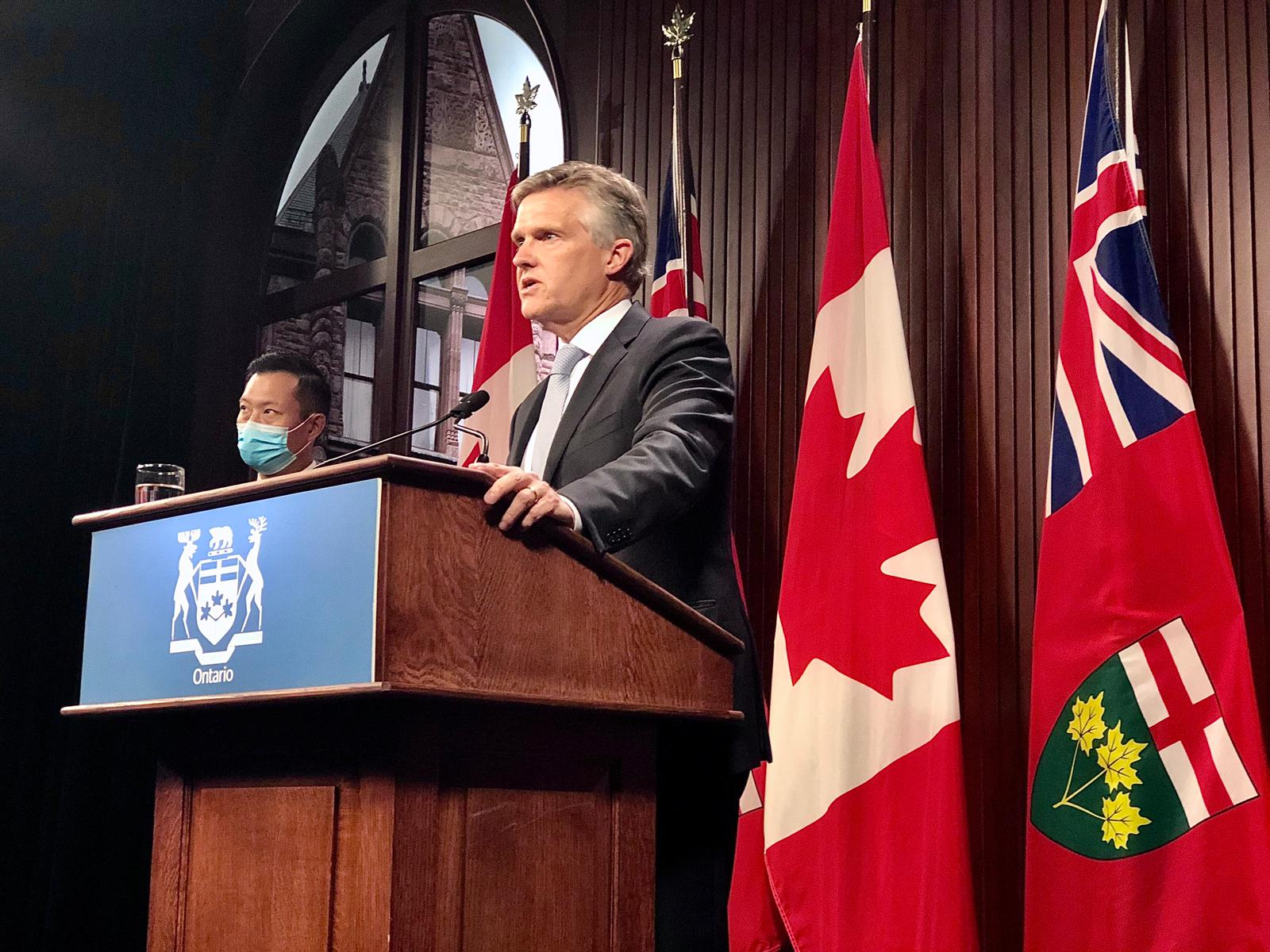
- Phillips in 2019

Minister of Long-Term Care
- In office June 18, 2021 – January 14, 2022
- Premier: Doug Ford
- Preceded by: Merrilee Fullerton
- Succeeded by: Paul Calandra

Minister of Finance
- In office June 20, 2019 – December 31, 2020
- Premier: Doug Ford
- Preceded by: Vic Fedeli
- Succeeded by: Peter Bethlenfalvy

Minister of the Environment, Conservation and Parks
- In office June 29, 2018 – June 20, 2019
- Premier: Doug Ford
- Preceded by: Chris Ballard
- Succeeded by: Jeff Yurek

Member of the Ontario Provincial Parliament for Ajax
- In office June 7, 2018 – February 2, 2022
- Preceded by: Riding Established
- Succeeded by: Patrice Barnes

Personal details
- Born: March 2, 1965 (age 61)
- Party: Progressive Conservative
- Spouse: Lydia Phillips
- Education: University of Western Ontario (BA)

Rod Phillips ECO is a Canadian businessman and former politician who was the member of Provincial Parliament (MPP) for Ajax from 2018 to 2022. A member of the Ontario Progressive Conservative (PC) Party, Phillips served as Ontario's minister of the environment, conservation and parks from 2018 to 2019, minister of finance from 2019 to 2020, and minister of long-term care from 2021 to 2022.

Phillips ran for MPP in the 2018 provincial election, following which his PC Party would form government. Premier Doug Ford named him environment minister, before promoting him to the finance portfolio, succeeding Vic Fedeli. He resigned from that role in 2020, after he took a vacation to St. Barts contrary to his government's public health advice during the COVID-19 pandemic, but was later named the minister of long-term care in 2021. Phillips resigned from cabinet in 2022 and resigned his seat in February, 2022, he did not run in the 2022 election.

Before politics, Phillips was the former president and CEO of Shepell-fgi, a professional services company, from 2002 to 2010; the president and CEO of the Ontario Lottery and Gaming Corporation (OLG) from 2011 to 2014; the chair of Postmedia from 2014 to 2017; and chair of CivicAction from 2014 to 2017. After stepping down from cabinet and resigning his seat, Phillips became vice-chair of Canaccord Genuity. He sits on the board of Aecon Group Inc.

== Education ==
Phillips graduated from the University of Western Ontario in 1988 with a Bachelor of Arts in political science and English. He completed a master of business administration degree at Wilfrid Laurier University in Waterloo, Ontario, graduating in 1992. Phillips also holds an ICD.D designation from the University of Toronto's Rotman School of Management.

== Business career ==
Phillips worked for KPMG. In 2001, after stint working as chief of staff to the mayor of Toronto, Mel Lastman, Phillips became co-managing director of the venture division of Goodmans LLP, one of Canada's leading law firms. A non-lawyer, his fellow co-managing director of the Goodmans Venture Group was Dale Lastman, the Goodmans co-chair and son of Mel Lastman.

In 2002, Phillips became president and CEO of Shepell-fgi, a company that delivered workplace health and productivity solutions to eight million employees and family members from over 7,000 organizations in Canada and 54 other countries. Under Phillips's leadership, Shepell-fgi (now Morneau-Shepell) grew its services to include elder and child support, legal advice, financial guidance, and help with mental health and addiction issues.

In May 2011, Phillips was recruited by the Province of Ontario to be the new president and CEO of the Ontario Lottery and Gaming Corporation, a government agency, reporting into the Ministry of Finance. During his tenure at OLG, Phillips led an effort to rehabilitate its reputation following several widely publicized scandals involving theft of winning tickets and fraudulently claimed prizes.

Phillips led the corporation to its highest net profit since 2005 and oversaw the design and launch of the modernization of Ontario's lottery and gaming industry. Under Phillips's direction, OLG was praised after it was able to identify a $50 million lottery winner, Kathy Jones, who had lost her winning ticket. Phillips presented Jones with her prize-winning cheque in a photo-op.

After leaving OLG, Phillips became the chair of the board of Postmedia, Canada's largest news media company, whose portfolio includes the National Post, the Toronto Sun, and the Ottawa Citizen. Phillips served as chair from 2014 until 2017.

From 2015 to 2017, Phillips was also on the board of directors of Afinti, a Washington DC–based global artificial intelligence company and served as the Canada chair.

== Political career ==
Phillips worked as chief of staff for former Ontario PC cabinet minister Elizabeth Witmer and former mayor of Toronto Mel Lastman. He also worked for Ontario PC leader John Tory as the director of his leader's tour during the 2007 Ontario provincial election.

In November 2017, Phillips was acclaimed as the Progressive Conservative candidate for the riding of Ajax.

Phillips considered running in the 2018 Progressive Conservative Party of Ontario leadership election, but ultimately declined and backed Caroline Mulroney. In the 2018 Ontario election, Phillips was elected to serve as the MPP for Ajax for the 42nd Parliament of Ontario. He defeated New Democrat candidate Monique Hughes and Liberal incumbent Joe Dickson to win the riding with 39.05% of the vote and 4,000 votes more than the runner-up.

=== Minister of Environment, Conservation and Parks ===
On June 29, 2018, Premier Doug Ford appointed Phillips as Minister of the Environment, Conservation and Parks in his cabinet. During that time Phillips repealed cap-and-trade in Ontario and replaced it with an Emissions Performance Standard (EPS) for businesses. The federal government accepted the EPS approach on business, but following the end of cap-and-trade imposed a province-wide carbon tax.

In June 2019, Phillips appointed David Lindsay, the CEO of the Council of Ontario Universities and former deputy natural resources minister, as a special advisor on revamping Ontario's Blue Box Recycling Program to shift the responsibility for paying from municipalities and non-profits to producers. This plan was supported by Lindsay's report and was scheduled to be phased in during 2023–2025 by Phillips's successor as Environment Minister, Jeff Yurek.

He also launched the first province-wide Climate Impact Assessment, modernized the province's 50 year old environmental assessment program and aligned it closer to the federal program, and renegotiated the Canada-Ontario Agreement on the Great Lakes.

=== Minister of Finance ===
On June 20, 2019, Phillips was appointed as the Minister of Finance.

==== COVID-19 ====
On March 25, 2020, Phillips released Ontario's Action Plan: Responding to COVID-19, which provided $17 billion in what the government referred to their "initial response" to provide support and relief to businesses and individuals in the province impacted from the global pandemic.

On March 31, 2020, because of the pandemic, Phillips released an economic update instead of the annual budget, which was initially deferred to November 2020. This failure to meet the mandated deadline in the Fiscal Sustainability, Transparency and Accountability Act, 2019 – passed by Ford – meant that Ford as premier and Phillips as finance minister, had to pay 10% of their annual salaries into the provincial Consolidated Revenue Fund. On April 9, 2020, he was appointed the chair of the Ontario Jobs and Recovery Committee, which has been tasked with planning for the economic reopening and recovery in the province.

==== Secret vacation and resignation ====
In December 2020, Phillips was widely criticized for leaving Canada for a personal Caribbean vacation in St. Barts when travel out of the country was strongly discouraged by the government of Canada at the time. In addition to leaving the country, Phillips took steps to leave the impression that he remained in his riding during his absence from the country by scheduling tweets during his absence, including a tweet on Christmas Eve thanking those who made sacrifices by avoiding travel over the holidays to protect others. Premier Doug Ford told him that "it will not be tolerated again", and told him to return home. Ford had previously said he was unaware that his finance minister had left the country but backtracked 24 hours later admitting he did know Phillips was not in the country, knew his destination and failed to issue a call for his return. His office confirmed that Phillips had also secretly vacationed in Switzerland in August 2020 and stated that he has quarantined for 14 days upon his return.

On December 31, 2020, Phillips resigned as Minister of Finance due to the controversy surrounding his trip to St. Barts.

=== Minister of Long-Term Care ===
On June 18, 2021, Phillips was appointed to be the minister of long-term care.

As minister, Phillips introduced legislation which increased penalties for violations in the industry and hired additional inspection staff. He also introduced a COVID-19 vaccination mandate for long-term care staff.

On January 14, 2022, Phillips announced he would not seek re-election in the next provincial election. He resigned his seat as MPP on February 2, 2022. He was succeeded in the legislature by PC candidate Patrice Barnes in the June 2022 Ontario general election.

== Community service ==
Phillips served as volunteer chair (2014–2017) of CivicAction a non-profit which focuses on issues in the Greater Toronto and Hamilton Area (GTHA). Phillips supported the CivicAction DiverseCity Fellows program, which seeks to have Toronto's leadership more fully reflect the city's cultural diversity. He has also served on the Telus Toronto Community Board. Since 2005, this organization has donated $8 million to 479 charities and grassroots projects in the Toronto area. Phillips was the founding chair of the Transforming Lives Gala for the Centre for Addiction and Mental Health. He served on the Boards of the Canadian Psychiatric Research Foundation, the Global Business and Economic Roundtable on Mental Health and Addiction, the Ontario College of Physicians and Surgeons, Bridgepoint Hospital, the Toronto Community Foundation, and is a past president of the Canadian Club of Toronto.

== Personal life ==
He is married to his wife Lydia.

== Electoral results ==
2018 Ontario general election: Ajax
Party	Candidate	Votes	%	±%
Progressive Conservative	Rod Phillips	19,078	39.05	+10.53
New Democratic	Monique Hughes	15,130	30.97	+14.70
Liberal	Joe Dickson	12,607	25.80	-25.97
Green	Stephen Leahy	1,224	2.51	-0.41
Libertarian	Marsha Haynes	312	0.64	
None of the Above	Frank Lopez	289	0.59	
Independent	Kevin J. Brackley	220	0.45	
Total valid votes		48,860	100.0	
Total rejected, unmarked and declined ballots				
Turnout			55.73	
Eligible voters		87,672		
Progressive Conservative pickup new district.				
Source: Elections Ontario
