= Section 70 of the Constitution Act, 1867 =

Provision of the Constitution of Canada

British North America Act, 1867

Section 70 of the Constitution Act, 1867 (French: Article 70 de la Loi constitutionnelle de 1867) is a provision of the Constitution of Canada, which defined the number of seats in the Legislative Assembly of Ontario when the province of Ontario was created in 1867. The number of seats is now defined by provincial statute.

The Constitution Act, 1867 is the constitutional statute which established Canada. Originally named the British North America Act, 1867, the Act continues to be the foundational statute for the Constitution of Canada, although it has been amended many times since 1867. It is now recognised as part of the supreme law of Canada.

== Constitution Act, 1867 ==
The Constitution Act, 1867 is part of the Constitution of Canada and thus part of the "supreme law of Canada". The Act sets out the constitutional framework of Canada, including the structure of the federal government and the powers of the federal government and the provinces. It was the product of extensive negotiations between the provinces of British North America at the Charlottetown Conference in 1864, the Quebec Conference in 1864, and the London Conference in 1866. Those conferences were followed by consultations with the British government in 1867. The Act was then enacted by the British Parliament under the name the British North America Act, 1867. In 1982 the Act was brought under full Canadian control through the Patriation of the Constitution, and was renamed the Constitution Act, 1867. Since Patriation, the Act can only be amended in Canada, under the amending formula set out in the Constitution Act, 1982.

== Text of section 70 ==
Section 70 reads:

Electoral districts
70 The Legislative Assembly of Ontario shall be composed of Eighty-two Members, to be elected to represent the Eighty-two Electoral Districts set forth in the First Schedule to this Act.

Section 70 is found in Part V of the Constitution Act, 1867, dealing with provincial constitutions. The number of seats has been expanded from time to time by the Ontario Legislature. As of 2025, the Legislative Assembly has 124 seats.

== Legislative history ==
The Quebec Resolutions, adopted at the Quebec Conference in 1864, proposed that the Province of Canada would be split into two new provinces, Ontario and Quebec, which would require the creation of new legislatures for each of them. However, the Resolutions did not set out the structure of the new legislatures, leaving that to be decided by the existing Legislature of the Province of Canada.

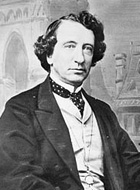
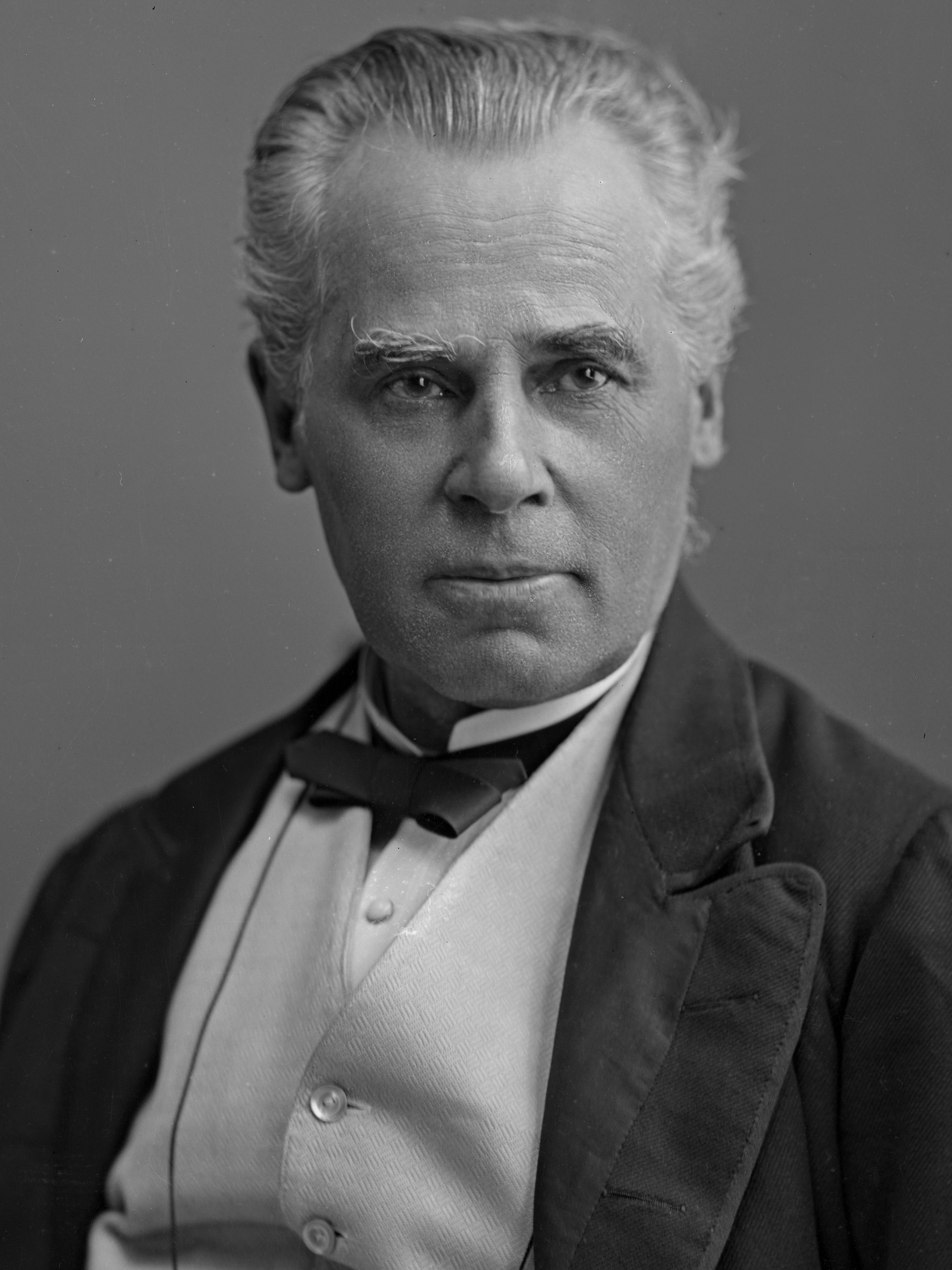
John A. Macdonald and George Etienne Cartier, who introduced the resolutions for the provincial constitutions

Accordingly, in the summer of 1866 the two co-premiers of the Province of Canada, John A. Macdonald and George-Étienne Cartier, introduced a series of resolutions in the Legislative Assembly of the Province of Canada setting out the proposed constitutions of the two new provinces. Resolution 12 provided that the Legislative Assembly of Ontario would consist of 82 members, the same as the number of seats Ontario would have in the new federal House of Commons. The same electoral map would be used for the provincial elections to the Ontario assembly, and for the federal elections to the House of Commons. An appendix set out the proposed boundaries for the electoral districts, which became the basis for the first schedule to the act. After debate on the set of resolutions, the Assembly approved resolution 12 on August 2, 1866.

At the London Conference in December 1866, the Canadian delegates passed the London Resolutions. They adopted the same language as resolution 41 of the Quebec Resolutions, that the existing provincial legislature would provide for the structure of the two new provinces.

Following the London Conference, a number of drafts of the bill were prepared, but the details of the electoral boundaries were not addressed until the fourth draft. Clause 32 of the fourth draft provided that Ontario would be divided into 82 electoral districts for the House of Commons, with what became the first schedule listing the 82 districts. Clause 76 then adopted the same boundaries to be used for the Legislative Assembly of Ontario. The final draft provided that the Ontario Legislative Assembly would be based on the 82 electoral districts set out in the first schedule to the bill.

== Purpose and interpretation ==
The province of Ontario was created by the Constitution Act, 1867 from the western portion of the Province of Canada. The Constitution Act, 1867 set out the constitution of the province, including a unicameral legislature composed of the lieutenant governor and the Legislative Assembly of Ontario. Section 70 set out the initial boundaries of the electoral districts for the Assembly, using the same electoral districts as were used for Ontario in the House of Commons in the federal Parliament. Those boundaries were defined by the first schedule to the act. The districts were single-member, with the 82 districts returning 82 members.

That also became the basis for the size of the Legislative Assembly of Ontario, with 82 members, elected on the same electoral map as the Ontario members of the House of Commons, set out in the first schedule of the act.

Section 92(1) of the act gave each province the power to amend its own constitution. (Note: Since 1982, the provinces' power to amend their constitutions is found in section 45 of the Constitution Act, 1982.) The Legislature of Ontario has used this power to alter the composition of the Legislative Assembly from time to time, beginning in 1874, when the Legislative Assembly was expanded to 88 members. As of 2025, the Legislative Assembly consists of 124 members.

== The First Schedule ==
The 82 electoral districts mentioned in the section are named and defined in the first schedule to the act. The same set of electoral districts was initially used for the election of Ontario members of the House of Commons in the federal Parliament.

== Related provisions of the Constitution Act, 1867 ==
Section 40 provides that the House of Commons will be elected from the electoral divisions set out in the first schedule to the act, the same as the Ontario Legislative Assembly.

Section 69 creates the Legislature of Ontario, consisting of the lieutenant governor and the Legislative Assembly of Ontario.
