= Section 89 of the Constitution Act, 1867 =

Provision of the Constitution of Canada

British North America Act, 1867

Section 89 of the Constitution Act, 1867 (French: article 89 de la Loi constitutionnelle de 1867) is a repealed provision of the Constitution of Canada relating to the first elections after Confederation in the provinces of Ontario, Quebec and Nova Scotia.

The Constitution Act, 1867 is the constitutional statute which established Canada. Originally named the British North America Act, 1867, the Act continues to be the foundational statute for the Constitution of Canada, although it has been amended many times since 1867. It is now recognised as part of the supreme law of Canada.

== Constitution Act, 1867 ==
The Constitution Act, 1867 is part of the Constitution of Canada and thus part of the supreme law of Canada. The Act sets out the constitutional framework of Canada, including the structure of the federal government and the powers of the federal government and the provinces. It was the product of extensive negotiations between the provinces of British North America at the Charlottetown Conference in 1864, the Quebec Conference in 1864, and the London Conference in 1866. Those conferences were followed by consultations with the British government in 1867. The Act was then enacted by the British Parliament under the name the British North America Act, 1867. In 1982 the Act was brought under full Canadian control through the Patriation of the Constitution, and was renamed the Constitution Act, 1867. Since Patriation, the Act can only be amended in Canada, under the amending formula set out in the Constitution Act, 1982.

== Text of section 89 ==
Section 89 reads:

First Elections
89 Each of the Lieutenant Governors of Ontario, Quebec, and Nova Scotia shall cause Writs to be issued for the First Election of Members of the Legislative Assembly thereof in such Form and by such Person as he thinks fit, and at such Time and addressed to such Returning Officer as the Governor General directs, and so that the First Election of Member of Assembly for any Electoral District or any Subdivision thereof shall be held at the same Time and at the same Places as the Election for a Member to serve in the House of Commons of Canada for that Electoral District.

Section 89 was found in Part V of the Constitution Act, 1867, dealing with provincial constitutions. It was repealed in 1893 as part of a general statute law revision.

== Legislative history ==
=== Development of the provision ===
There was no provision in either the Quebec Resolutions or the London Resolutions dealing with the first provincial elections after Confederation. Both sets of resolutions simply provided that the government structure of the provinces would be determined by the provincial legislatures.

The issue of elections was not raised until the fourth draft of the bill, during the negotiations between the delegates and the British government. That draft used wording very similar to the final wording, although it referred to the "House of Assembly" rather than the House of Commons. The provision took final form in the last draft before the introduction of the bill in the British Parliament.

=== Repeal ===
Section 89 was repealed by the British Parliament in 1893, in the Statute Law Revision Act 1893. The revision act was of a housekeeping nature, repealing statutory provisions which no longer had any purpose. Since the first elections had been held under this provision in 1867, section 89 was no longer needed and was repealed.

There is no indication that the British government consulted the government of Canada about the repeal.

== Purpose and interpretation ==
Section 89 provided the mechanism for elections in the two new provinces of Ontario and Quebec, and also required an election in the existing province of Nova Scotia. The Lieutenant Governors of each province were to issue writs for the general elections, which were held concurrently with the elections for the new federal Parliament, and at the same voting locations. That approach would minimise confusion in the elections for the new governments.

The provinces of Ontario and Quebec were created by the Constitution Act, 1867, replacing the old Province of Canada. Elections were necessary for the new legislatures of Ontario and Quebec.

Nova Scotia was included in the provision because the previous election for the Nova Scotia House of Assembly had been held in May 1863, and by law the Assembly lasted for four years.

New Brunswick was not included in the provision because there had been a general election in May and June of 1866, so there was no need for an immediate election in that province.

The 1867 federal election was spread over several weeks, as had been the practice in the Province of Canada, rather than being held on a single day. The federal election period ran from August 7 to September 20, 1867. Quebec and Ontario therefore held their first elections during the months of August and September. The Nova Scotia election was held on a single day, September 18, 1867.

== Related provisions ==
Section 69 of the Act created the Legislature of Ontario.

Section 71 of the Act created the Legislature of Quebec.

Section 81 of the Act required the Legislatures of Ontario and Quebec to be summoned within six months of the date of the union, which occurred on July 1, 1867.

Section 88 of the Act continued the existing Legislature of Nova Scotia.
