= Ajax (provincial electoral district) =

Provincial electoral district in Ontario, Canada

Coordinates: 43.855°N 79.060°W

Ontario electoral district
- Ajax in relation to other Greater Toronto Area districts

Provincial electoral district
- Legislature: Legislative Assembly of Ontario
MPP
Rob Cerjanec
Liberal
- District created: 2015
- First contested: 2018
- Last contested: 2025

Demographics
- Population (2016): 119,680
- Electors (2018): 90,206
- Area (km²): 68
- Pop. density (per km²): 1,760
- Census division: Durham
- Census subdivision: Ajax

Ajax is a provincial electoral district in Ontario, Canada. It elects one member to the Legislative Assembly of Ontario. This riding was created in 2015.

== Members of Provincial Parliament ==
Ajax
Assembly	Years	Member	Party
Riding created from Ajax—Pickering
42nd	2018–2022	Rod Phillips	Progressive Conservative
43rd	2022–2025	Patrice Barnes	Progressive Conservative
44th	2025–present	Rob Cerjanec	Liberal

== Election results ==
Winning party in each polling division of Ajax at the 2025 Ontario general election

2025 Ontario general election
Party	Candidate	Votes	%	±%
Liberal	Rob Cerjanec	18,499	44.96	+8.98
Progressive Conservative	Patrice Barnes	18,168	44.16	+3.47
New Democratic	Arthur Augustine	2,884	7.01	–9.68
Green	Cory Feferman	866	2.10	–1.36
New Blue	Chris Rees	413	1.00	–0.65
Centrist	Sarah Qureshi	312	0.76	–
Total valid votes		41,142	99.64	
Total rejected, unmarked and declined ballots		148	0.36	–0.19
Turnout		41,290	41.56	+1.60
Eligible voters		99,349		
Liberal gain from Progressive Conservative		Swing		▲2.76
Source: Elections Ontario

Winning party in each polling division of Ajax at the 2022 Ontario general election

2022 Ontario general election
Party	Candidate	Votes	%	±%
Progressive Conservative	Patrice Barnes	15,336	40.69	+1.65
Liberal	Amber Bowen	13,561	35.98	+10.18
New Democratic	Christine Santos	6,291	16.69	–14.27
Green	Neil Runnalls	1,305	3.46	+0.96
New Blue	Garry Reader	625	1.66	–
Ontario Party	Aaron Hopkins	330	0.88	–
Independent	Intab Ali	127	0.34	–
Independent	Allen Hadley	112	0.30	–
Total valid votes		37,687	99.45	
Total rejected, unmarked and declined ballots		209	0.55	–0.30
Turnout		37,896	39.96	–14.67
Eligible voters		94,835		
Progressive Conservative hold		Swing		▼4.27
Source: Elections Ontario

2018 Ontario general election
Party	Candidate	Votes	%	±%
Progressive Conservative	Rod Phillips	19,078	39.05	+10.53
New Democratic	Monique Hughes	15,130	30.97	+14.70
Liberal	Joe Dickson	12,607	25.80	–25.97
Green	Stephen Leahy	1,224	2.51	–0.41
Libertarian	Marsha Haynes	312	0.64	+0.11
None of the Above	Frank Lopez	289	0.59	–
Independent	Kevin J. Brackley	220	0.45	–
Total valid votes		48,860	99.15	
Total rejected, unmarked and declined ballots		421	0.85	
Turnout		49,281	54.63	
Eligible voters		90,206		
Progressive Conservative notional gain from Liberal		Swing		▲18.25
Source: Elections Ontario

2014 general election redistributed results
Party	Vote	%
Liberal	20,825	51.77
Progressive Conservative	11,471	28.51
New Democratic	6,544	16.27
Green	1,174	2.92
Libertarian	214	0.53

== See also ==
- List of Ontario provincial electoral districts
- Canadian provincial electoral districts
