= Rob Cerjanec =

Canadian politician

Rob Cerjanec MPP
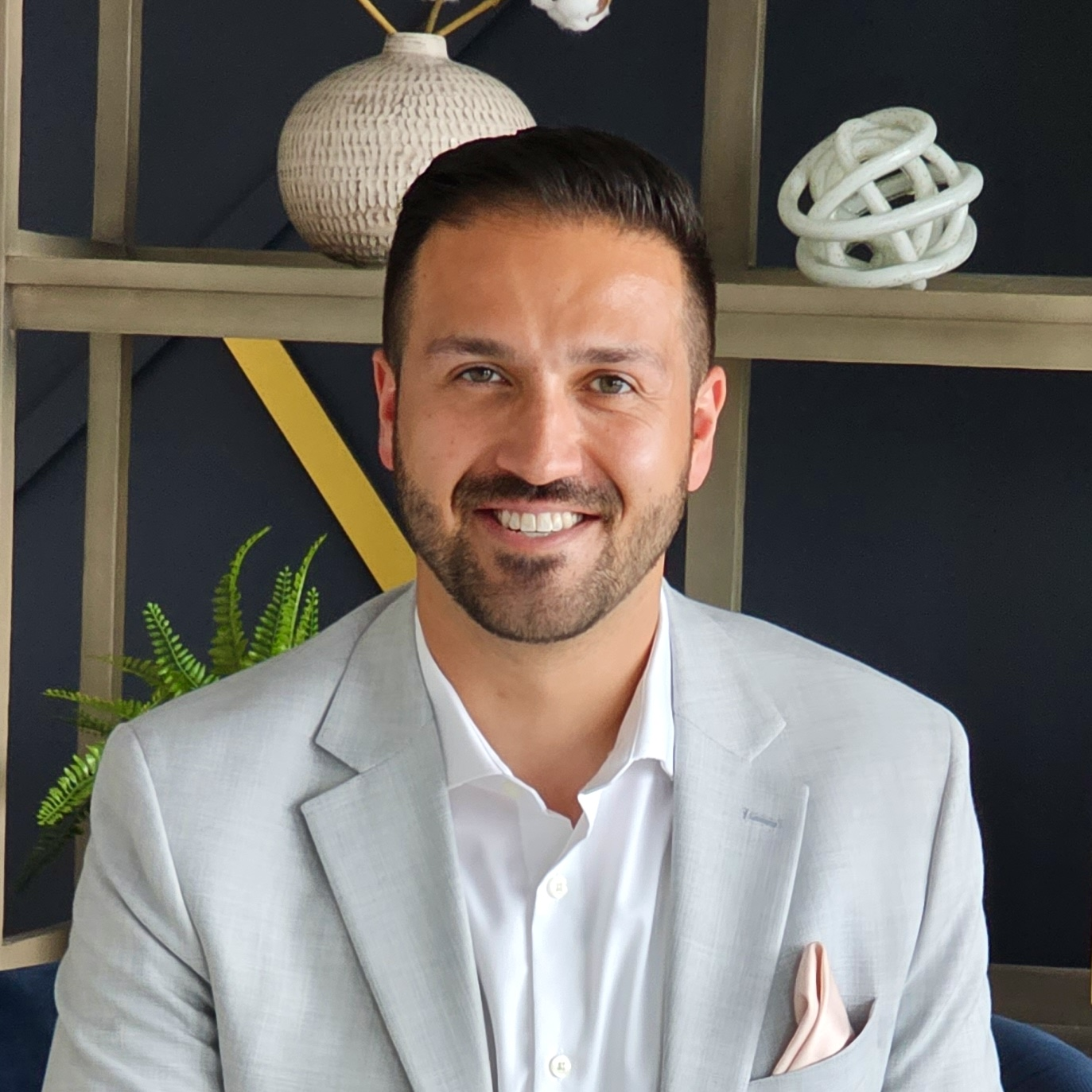
- Cerjanec in 2023

Member of the Ontario Provincial Parliament for Ajax
- Incumbent
- Assumed office February 27, 2025
- Preceded by: Patrice Barnes

Personal details
- Born: September 23, 1988 (age 37)
- Party: Ontario Liberal
- Education: York University (BA); Schulich School of Business, York University (MBA)
- Website: robcerjanecmpp.ca

Robert Charles Cerjanec (born 1988) is a Canadian politician who has served as a Member of Provincial Parliament since 2025. A member of the Ontario Liberal Party, he represents the riding of Ajax. He was previously a small business owner and consultant, and served on the senior leadership teams of Toronto Deputy Mayor Ana Bailão and the Durham District School Board.

== Early life and education ==
Cerjanec was born in North York and raised by a single mother. He is of German, Croatian, and Maltese ancestry. His grandfather immigrated to Canada from Croatia in 1950 and worked on a farm in Bradford. Cerjanec holds a Bachelor of Arts in Political Science from York University and an MBA from the Schulich School of Business. Cerjanec worked in restaurants during high school and college; his first job was at McDonald's.

== Career and politics ==
Before running for public office, Cerjanec served as Chief of Staff to the Deputy Mayor of Toronto, Ana Bailão, where he helped shape policy on housing, transit, development, and community initiatives. He went on to serve on the senior leadership team at the Durham District School Board, where he managed strategic initiatives and external relations. After leaving the School Board, Cerjanec worked as an independent communications consultant. He has been a member of the Ontario Liberal Party since 2010 and has volunteered on countless political campaigns.

Cerjanec was first elected in the 2025 Ontario general election, defeating incumbent Progressive Conservative MPP Patrice Barnes by 331 votes. Cerjanec's platform focused on local issues like increasing GO Train service and addressing homelessness, along with "better health care, public education and an economy that creates jobs and prepares us for the future.”

Upon being elected, Cerjanec was named the Ontario Liberal Critic for Economic Development & Innovation, and Tourism, Sport & Culture. The first Private Members Bill he introduced was Bill 61, Ontario Artificial Intelligence, Talent and Innovation Strategy Act, 2025. The Bill did not pass on second reading with the governing Progressive Conservative caucus voting against. It was the first Bill introduced in the Legislative Assembly of Ontario that sought to address the use and expansion of artificial intelligence outside of government. The purpose of the Act was to require the Government of Ontario to design, implement and maintain a comprehensive artificial intelligence, talent and innovation strategy in order to develop and grow Ontario’s economy, with the goal of making Ontario a global and national leader in artificial intelligence and innovation within 10 years.

Cerjanec entered the 2026 Ontario Liberal Party leadership race on May 28, 2026. On July 5, he announced he was suspending his leadership campaign, reportedly due to fundraising challenges.

== Electoral history ==
2025 Ontario general election: Ajax
Party	Candidate	Votes	%	±%
Liberal	Robert Cerjanec	18,499	44.96	+8.98
Progressive Conservative	Patrice Barnes	18,168	44.16	+3.47
New Democratic	Arthur Augustine	2,884	7.01	–9.68
Green	Cory Feferman	866	2.10	–1.36
New Blue	Chris Rees	413	1.00	–0.66
Centrist	Sarah Qureshi	312	0.76	N/A
Total valid vote/expense limits		41,142	99.64	+0.19
Total rejected, unmarked, and declined ballots		148	0.36	–0.19
Turnout		41,290	41.56	+1.60
Eligible voters		99,349		
Liberal gain from Progressive Conservative		Swing		+2.76
Source: Elections Ontario
