= Section 69 of the Constitution Act, 1867 =

Provision of the Constitution of Canada

British North America Act, 1867

Section 69 of the Constitution Act, 1867 (French: Article 69 de la Loi constitutionnelle de 1867) is a provision of the Constitution of Canada creating the Legislature of the province of Ontario, which did not exist prior to 1867. The Constitution Act, 1867 created Ontario, including the institutions of the new provincial government, such as the Legislature.

The Legislature was unicameral, consisting of the Lieutenant Governor of Ontario and the elected Legislative Assembly. Ontario operates on the Westminster parliamentary system of responsible government, with the government drawn from, and responsible to, the Legislative Assembly.

The Constitution Act, 1867 is the constitutional statute which established Canada. Originally named the British North America Act, 1867, the Act continues to be the foundational statute for the Constitution of Canada, although it has been amended many times since 1867. It is now recognised as part of the supreme law of Canada.

== Constitution Act, 1867 ==
The Constitution Act, 1867 is part of the Constitution of Canada and thus part of the supreme law of Canada. The Act sets out the constitutional framework of Canada, including the structure of the federal government and the powers of the federal government and the provinces. It was the product of extensive negotiations between the provinces of British North America at the Charlottetown Conference in 1864, the Quebec Conference in 1864, and the London Conference in 1866. Those conferences were followed by consultations with the British government in 1867. The Act was then enacted by the British Parliament under the name the British North America Act, 1867. In 1982 the Act was brought under full Canadian control through the Patriation of the Constitution, and was renamed the Constitution Act, 1867. Since Patriation, the Act can only be amended in Canada, under the amending formula set out in the Constitution Act, 1982.

== Text of section 69 ==
Section 69 reads:

Legislature for Ontario
69 There shall be a Legislature for Ontario consisting of the Lieutenant Governor and of One House, styled the Legislative Assembly of Ontario.

Section 69 is found in Part V of the Constitution Act, 1867, dealing with provincial constitutions. It has not been amended since the Act was enacted in 1867.

== Legislative history ==
At the Quebec Conference, the Quebec Resolutions provided that the Province of Canada would be divided into two new provinces, Ontario and Quebec. The conference delegates left the constitutional structure of the two new provinces to the government of the Province of Canada to determine.

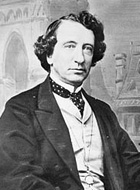
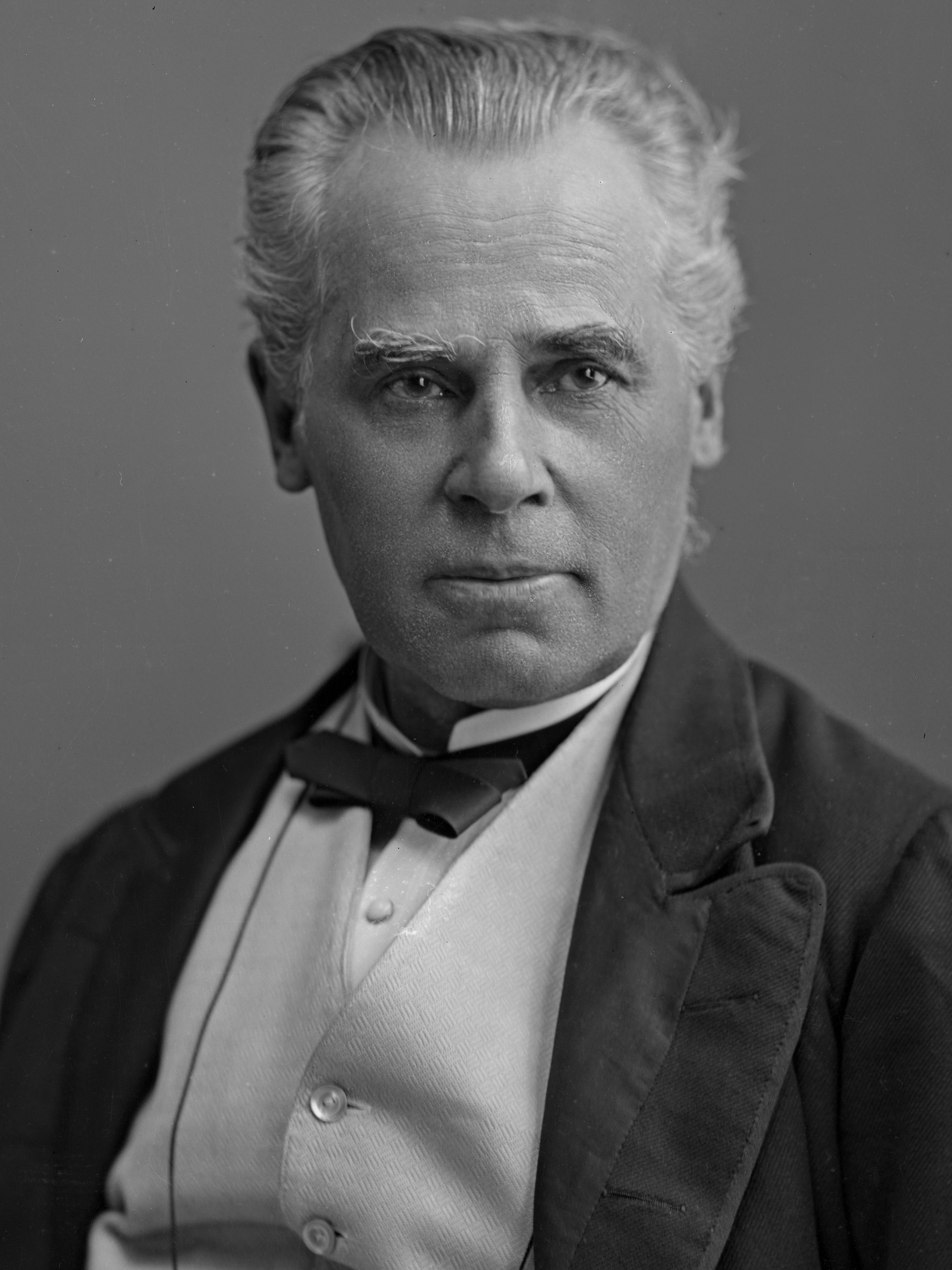
John A. Macdonald and George-Étienne Cartier, who introduced the resolutions for the provincial constitutions

In July 1866, the Parliament of the Province of Canada considered an additional set of resolutions, to set out the framework for the constitutions of the two new provinces. The additional resolutions were introduced in the Legislative Assembly on July 13, 1866, by the joint premiers, John A. Macdonald and George-Étienne Cartier. The fifth resoution provided that Upper Canada (the old name for what would become Ontario), would have a legislature composed of one chamber, the Legislative Assembly.

At the London Conference in December 1866, the delegates adopted the same approach as in the Quebec Resolutions: the local governments would be as determined by the Province of Canada.

The first rough draft of the British North America bill was prepared by the four provincial attorneys general present at the London Conference. (Note: The four attorneys general were John A. Macdonald, Canada West; George-Étienne Cartier, Canada East; William Alexander Henry, Nova Scotia; and Charles Fisher, New Brunswick.) That draft simply provided that the provincial governments would be constituted by the provincial legislatures, "subject to the provisions of this act".

The initial draft prepared by the British drafter similarly did not deal with the details of the provincial constitutions. Instead, in referring to the provincial constitutions, a note to the draft stated: "It is understood that Draft Clauses on these Subjects are being prepared by the Delegates of the several Colonies, which when completed can be considered in Consultation with them."

It was not until the third draft that provision was made for the legislature of Ontario, composed of one chamber, although the name had not yet been determined. The provision took final form in the fourth draft: the Legislature would consist of the lieutenant governor and one chamber, called the Legislative Assembly.

== Purpose and interpretation ==
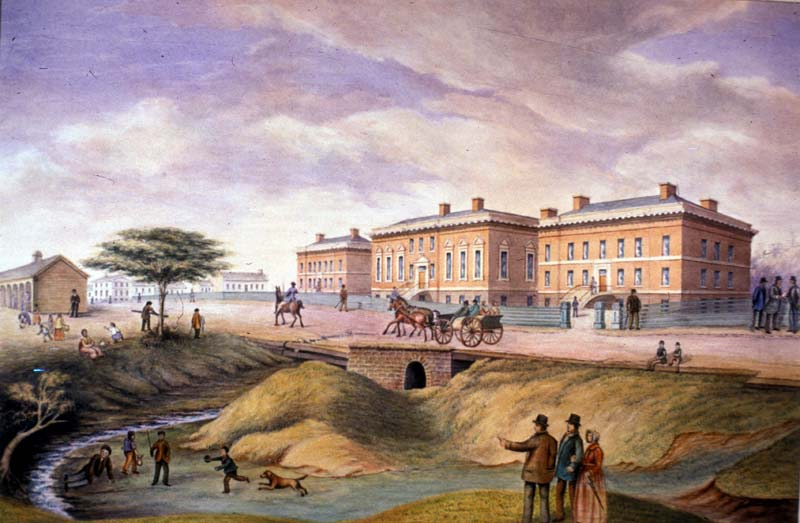
First Parliament buildings used by the Legislature of Ontario immediately after Confederation

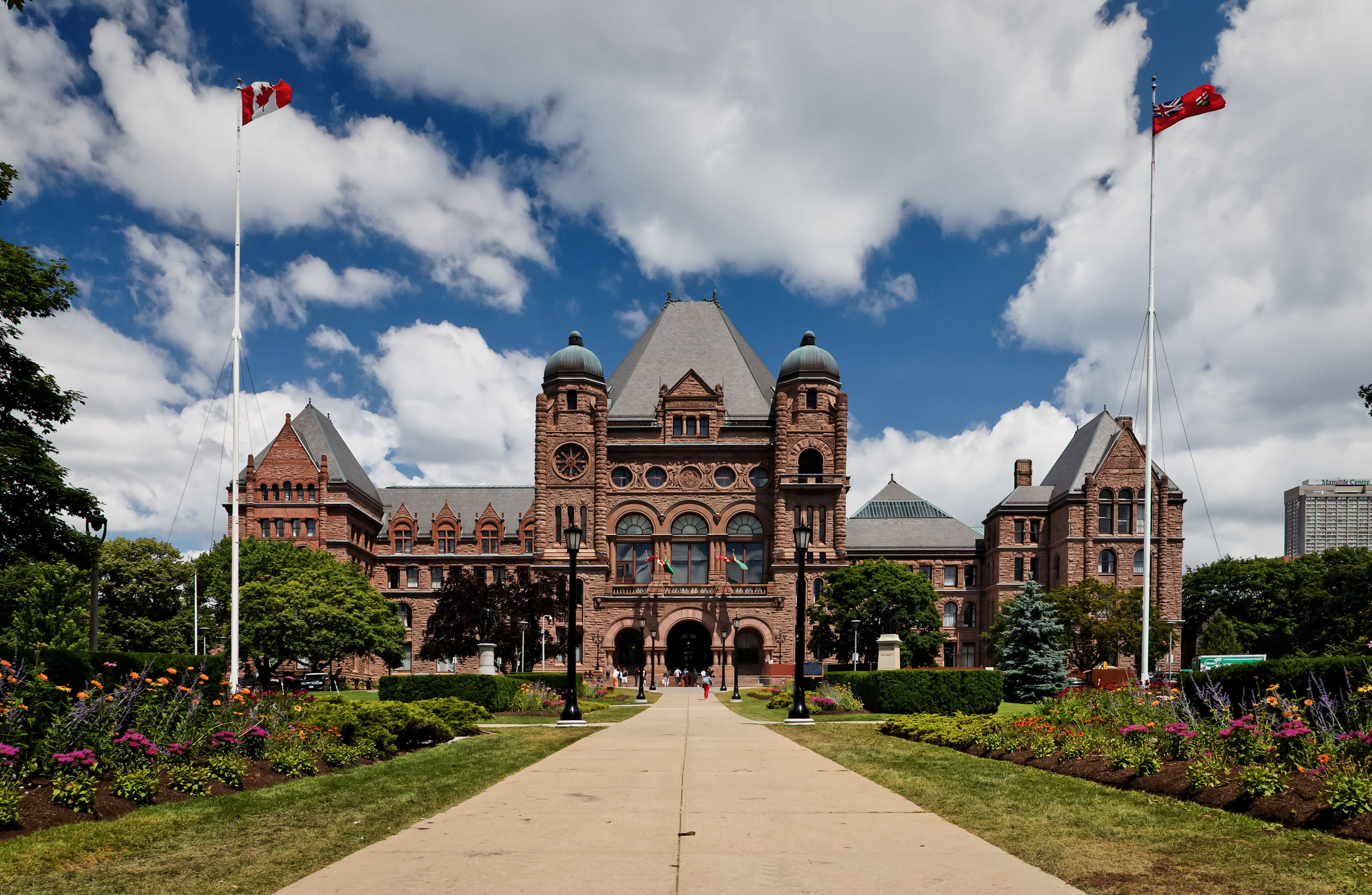
Queen's Park, the current legislative buildings of the Legislature of Ontario

The province of Ontario did not exist prior to 1867. In 1841, the British government had merged Lower Canada and Upper Canada to form the Province of Canada. Twenty years later, in the negotiations leading to Confederation, the Canadians agreed from the start that the Province of Canada would be split into two separate provinces in the new federation. Each of the new provinces would need completely new constitutions, including legislatures, because the old Parliament of the Province of Canada would cease to exist.

The delegates at the Quebec Conference did not put a great deal of work into the constitutions of the provinces. Some of the delegates viewed the provinces as simply large municipalities, who would have much less power than the previous colonial provinces, while others thought they were continuations of the provinces. Ultimately, the delegates fell back on the well-known structure of the pre-Confederation models, based on the fundamental principle of responsible government.

Accordingly, the Legislature of Ontario created by section 69 of the Act resembled the pre-Confederation legislatures, but with one significant difference: it was unicameral, consisting of the elected Legislative Assembly and the appointed Lieutenant Governor of Ontario, the representative of the Crown. The Assembly originally had 82 seats, the same as would be used the new federal House of Commons. The Legislative Assembly would also use the same electoral map as would be used in the House of Commons.

The unicameral legislature was the first in British North America. In the 1866 debates in the Legislative Assembly of the Province of Canada on the proposed constitution for the new province of Ontario, some of the members thought it a risky experiment, others saw it as a cost-saving measure. John A. Macdonald explained that it was sufficient to have a unicameral legislature for what he considered to be a "subordinate Legislature", in the nature of a municipal body.

Not everyone agreed with the proposed legislature. On the one hand, George Brown agreed with Macdonald's conception of the local governments as being similar to large municipalities or counties. He suggested that the new province did not need a full-fledged parliamentary government, and suggested that their executive officers should be elected separately from the assembly, but did not press his proposal. On the other hand, one Conservative member from Canada West, John Hillyard Cameron, proposed that Ontario should have a bicameral legislature, but his motion was defeated (13–86).

The unicameral Ontario legislature was in contrast to the proposal for Quebec, which would have a bicameral legislature, with an appointed upper house. Nova Scotia and New Brunswick would retain their bicameral legislatures. All four legislatures would continue to operate under the principle of responsible government, with the government drawn from the elected legislative assemblies.

== Related provisions of the Constitution Act, 1867 ==
Section 6 of the act split the Province of Canada into the two new provinces, Ontario and Quebec.

Section 70 of the Act provided that the Legislative Assembly would be composed of 82 members, using the electoral divisions set out in the First Schedule of the Constitution Act, 1867.

Section 81 of the Act provided that the Legislature was to be summoned no later than six months from the date the Constitution Act, 1867 came into force.

Section 82 of the Act provides that the Lieutenant Governor of Ontario has the power to summon the Legislative Assembly from time to time.

Section 83 of the Act prohibited individuals who hold provincial offices from sitting in the Legislative Assembly, other than the members of the Executive Council of Ontario.

Section 89 of the act provided the rules for the first provincial election, which was to be held at the same time as the first federal election.

Sections 92 to 95 of the Act set out the legislative authority of the provincial legislatures.
