= Legislative Assembly of Ontario =

Provincial legislature of Ontario

Legislative Assembly of Ontario Assemblée législative de l'Ontario
- 44th Parliament of Ontario
- Coat of arms

Type
- Type: Unicameral house of the Legislature of Ontario
- Sovereign: King in Right of Ontario

History
- Founded: July 1, 1867
- Preceded by: Legislative Assembly of the Province of Canada (pre-confederation); Legislative Assembly of Upper Canada (pre-union)

Leadership
- Speaker: Donna Skelly, PC since April 14, 2025
- Premier: Doug Ford, PC since June 29, 2018
- Leader of the Official Opposition: Marit Stiles, NDP since February 4, 2023
- Government House Leader: Stephen J. Clark, PC since June 6, 2024
- Opposition House Leader: John Vanthof, NDP since February 3, 2021

Structure
- Seats: 124
- Political groups: Government; Progressive Conservative (79); Official Opposition; New Democratic (27); Parties with official status; Liberal (14); Parties without official status; Green (2); Independent (2)

Elections
- Voting system: Single-member plurality
- Last election: February 27, 2025
- Next election: On or before April 11, 2030

Meeting place
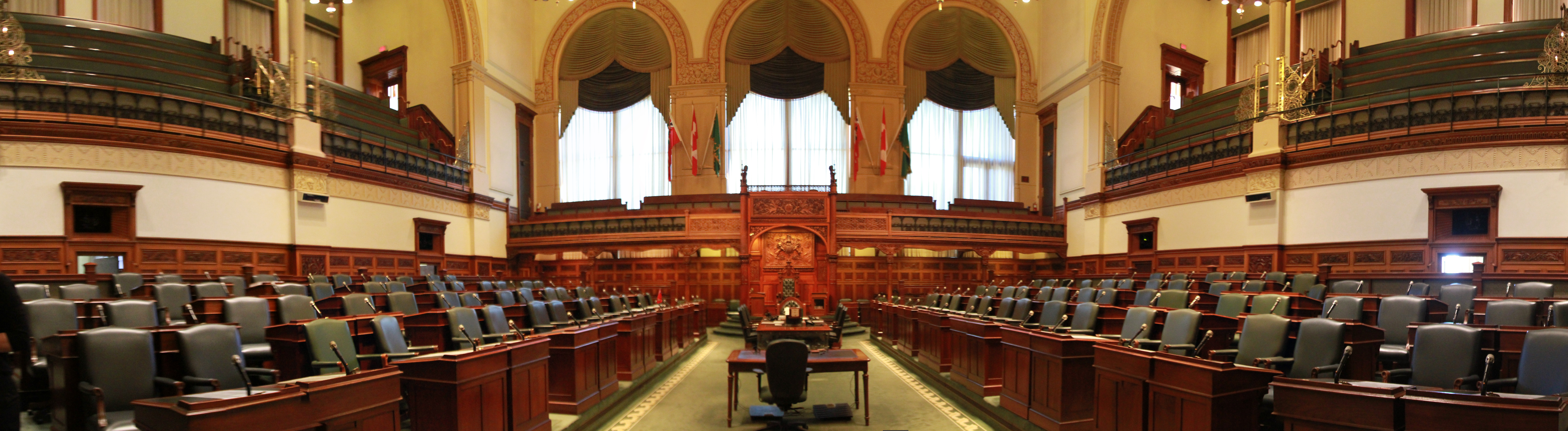
- Ontario Legislative Building; Toronto, Ontario

Website
- www.ola.org

Constitution
- Constitution Act, 1867 (Sec. 69 & Sec. 70)

The Legislative Assembly of Ontario (OLA; French: Assemblée législative de l'Ontario) is the deliberative assembly vested with the law-making authorities and the oversight of the Government of Ontario, the provincial government of the Canadian province of Ontario. It consists of 124 members, known as members of Provincial Parliament (MPPs), elected by Canadian citizens residing in geographical divisions known formally as electoral districts. The assembly meets at the Ontario Legislative Building, its home since 1892 located at Queen's Park in the provincial capital of Toronto. Most of the current members of the assembly were elected in the most recent general election held in February 2025.

Formally, the Legislature of Ontario, as in the institution formally vested with the relevant legislative and oversight authorities, is a unicameral legislature consists of two elements: the Lieutenant Governor of Ontario as the representative of the King of Canada in Ontario, and the Legislative Assembly of Ontario. Bills passed by the legislative assembly come into effect when they are given royal assent by the lieutenant governor. Given the legislature's unicameral design and the lieutenant governor's limited formal discretionary authority over government matters, the assembly in office is in practice the legislature, and therefore is often referred to as such. It is also often referred to as the "Provincial Parliament of Ontario" due to the members' formal title as MPPs.

The Government of Ontario operates as a Westminster-style parliamentary government in which voters indirectly elect the government through the MPPs elected for individual electoral districts using a first-past-the-post system. The premier of Ontario (the province's head of government) holds office by virtue of their ability to command the confidence of the assembly, by convention (but not necessarily) sitting as an MPP themselves and leading the largest party or a coalition in the assembly. The largest party not forming the government is known as the Official Opposition, its leader being recognized as the Leader of the Opposition.

The legislative assembly is the second largest Canadian provincial deliberative assembly by number of members after the National Assembly of Quebec.

Owing to the location of the Legislative Building on the grounds of Queen's Park, the metonym Queen's Park is often used to refer to both the provincial government and the legislative assembly.

== Membership ==
=== Electoral districts ===
Members of the legislative assembly are democratically elected to represent residents within defined geographical areas known as electoral districts, or more colloquially, "ridings". Section 4 of the Canadian Charter of Rights and Freedom requires that provincial general election be held no later than five years after the previous election. Since the end of World War II, elections have usually been held every three to four years. Like other Westminster-style parliamentary governments, Ontario voters exercise their democratic franchise indirectly by electing local MPPs, via plurality voting (or the "first-past-the-post" system).

The 124 members currently in office together make up the 44th Parliament (or 44th Legislature) of Ontario. Each member represent a single-member electoral district, though some members in previous parliaments have been elected from duo-member districts. For two elections in the late 1800s, voters in Toronto were given two votes each to elect three-members. No member have been elected from multi member district since the 1926 election.

The members of the Ontario assembly are the only provincial legislators in Canada that use the title of Member of Provincial Parliament. The working title was formally adopted via a resolution of the assembly in 1938 though members have been informally (though with little consistency) referred to as MPP in the press for much longer. The initially were used along with MLA or MHA (as the assembly of Upper Canada was known as the House of Assembly) interchangeably, leading to much confusions. Toronto MPP Frederick Fraser Hunter introduced a private member's bill to address the matter but it failed to pass, and the resolution was adopted in its stead to adopt the use as a practice. The elected members remain however formally Ontario's members of the Legislative Assembly (MLAs), the working title used by provincial legislators in most other provinces, (Note: with the exception of Quebec and Newfoundland and Labrador) in references by legislations including the Canadian constitution.

The membership of the legislature grew from eighty-two in 1867 to as many as 130 members between 1987 and 1999. The Fewer Politicians Act, 1996 brought the number back down to 103. More importantly, it ended Ontario's redistribution processes and simply adopted the federal electoral boundary in a provincial election following the completion of the federal redistribution process. That was later modified to maintain representation level for Northern Ontario and to increase representation of indigenous communities residing in the sparsely populated far north of the province. For more than 90% of the province however, provincial representation had consistently followed federal representation between 1999 and to 2025. The process of adopting federal boundary stopped at the 2025 election as the incumbent government declined to adopted Representation Order 2023. As of June 2026, the Ford ministry had not indicated when or whether it would resume the adoption of federal boundaries, nor had it proposed any alternative retribution mechanism or plan. Accordingly, representation in the provincial legislature continues to be based on population statistics from the 2011 census.

=== Qualification and Eligibility ===
To sit as a member of the assembly, a person must meet four requirements: be eighteen or older, a Canadian citizen, a resident of Ontario, not otherwise disqualified to sit or to be elected. A person may be disqualified for a variety of reasons, before or after they were elected. and how their disqualification would be effected is dependant on the reasons for their disqualification. For example, Members of the federal parliament (both MPs and senators) are not eligible to stand for election to the legislative assembly. Any MPP elected to the House of Commons or appointed senators automatically have their seated in the legislative assembly vacated. Members of municipal council in the other hand may stand for election, but their municipal seat would be automatically vacated if they are elected. A member is not disqualified by any criminal conviction, but would be by prison sentence of two years or more.

=== Speaker ===
The Speaker of the Legislative Assembly of Ontario is the MPP elected by the assembly to preside over the assembly and to head the Office of the Assembly, the independent administrative body that provides for the administrative functions of the legislative assembly and the legislative precincts. The formal authorities of both roles, now mostly formalized in legislations, are augmented by many long held customs, constitutional conventions and past adherence to parliamentary sovereignty. Similar to the Speaker of the House of Commons in Ottawa (but unlike their counterpart in Westminster) , the Ontario Speaker refrains from participating in party caucus and in partisan activities, but is not required to resign their party membership. Only one Ontario Speaker, Liberal Nelson Parliament who was nominated in 1920 by the then newly formed United Farmers government to be Speaker in the 15th Parliament, resigned from his party upon taking the speaker's chair. He was also the first Ontario Speaker not from the governing party. (Note: The party affiliation for Richard William Scott, who served as Speaker for the two weeks that saw the fall of the John Sandfield Macdonald ministry and was immediately appointed to the new Liberal cabinet, is debatable.)

Speakers prior to 1990 were generally named by the government. While the office was subject to election, the elections were conducted via recorded votes on motions tabled in the house usually by the Premier or a senior minister, and were therefore invariably uncontested. Secret ballot was introduced for Speaker election for the first time in 1990. While the only candidate from the governing party, David Warner prevailed, he faced competition from three other candidates. Just six years later, the legislature elected Chris Stockwell, for the first time declined to elect the candidate with the expressed backing of the Premier. The legislature again declined to elect the candidates preferred by the Premier in 2011 and 2018. In all three instance the candidates backed by the Premier were women, though in the two latter instances, the Premiers backed candidates seeking to oust incumbent Speakers they deemed too independent, and the legislature opted to re-elect the incumbents.

The current speaker is Donna Skelly. Her election in April 2025 made her the first woman to serve as Speaker, though her election and the election of a woman as speaker was a virtual certainty as her only competition was a woman MPP from the opposition bench, Jennifer French. Speaker Skelly is supported by four other MPPs who served as her deputies. Two of the deputies are members of opposition parties, one of them being Ms. French.

=== Caucus ===
MPPs with the same partisan affiliation form parliamentary caucuses. Caucus with more members than ten percent of the total number of seats are formally recognized in the legislature. Recognized opposition party caucus are entitled to a budget for caucus office, additional salary for their caucus officers, receive certain information and notification from the government and place topics for debate on the order papers. Most operational and procedural decisions, from consequential matters such as entitlement to move for want of confidence to routine procedural matters such as allocation of time and committee membership to mundane administration matters such as office space allocation are determined based on the relative sizes of the recognized party caucuses. Members of caucus lacking recognition are mostly treated as independent members and are afforded with very limited access to such entitlements.

== Lawmaking ==
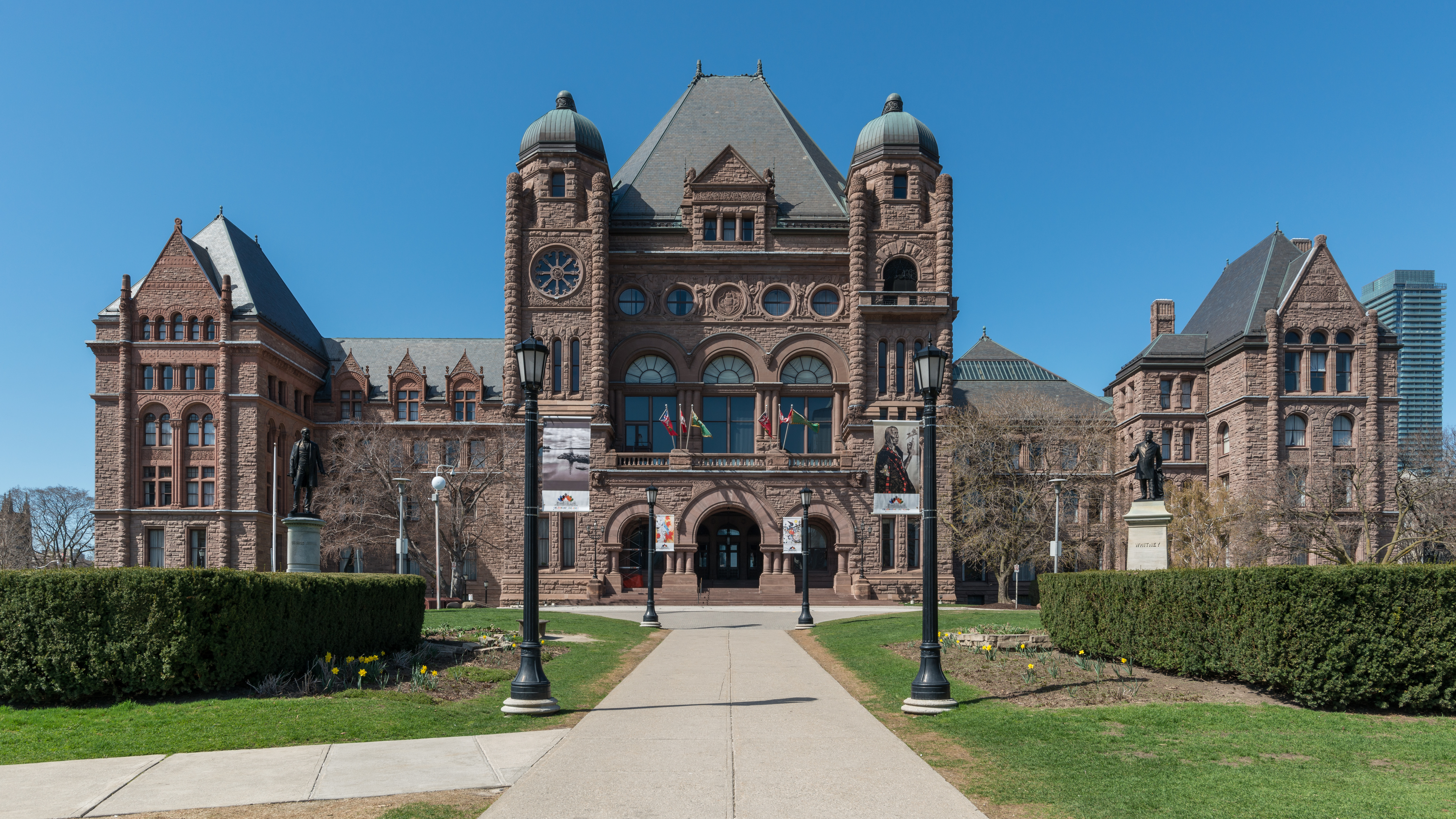
The southern façade of the Ontario Legislative Building, the meeting place for the Legislative Assembly of Ontario.

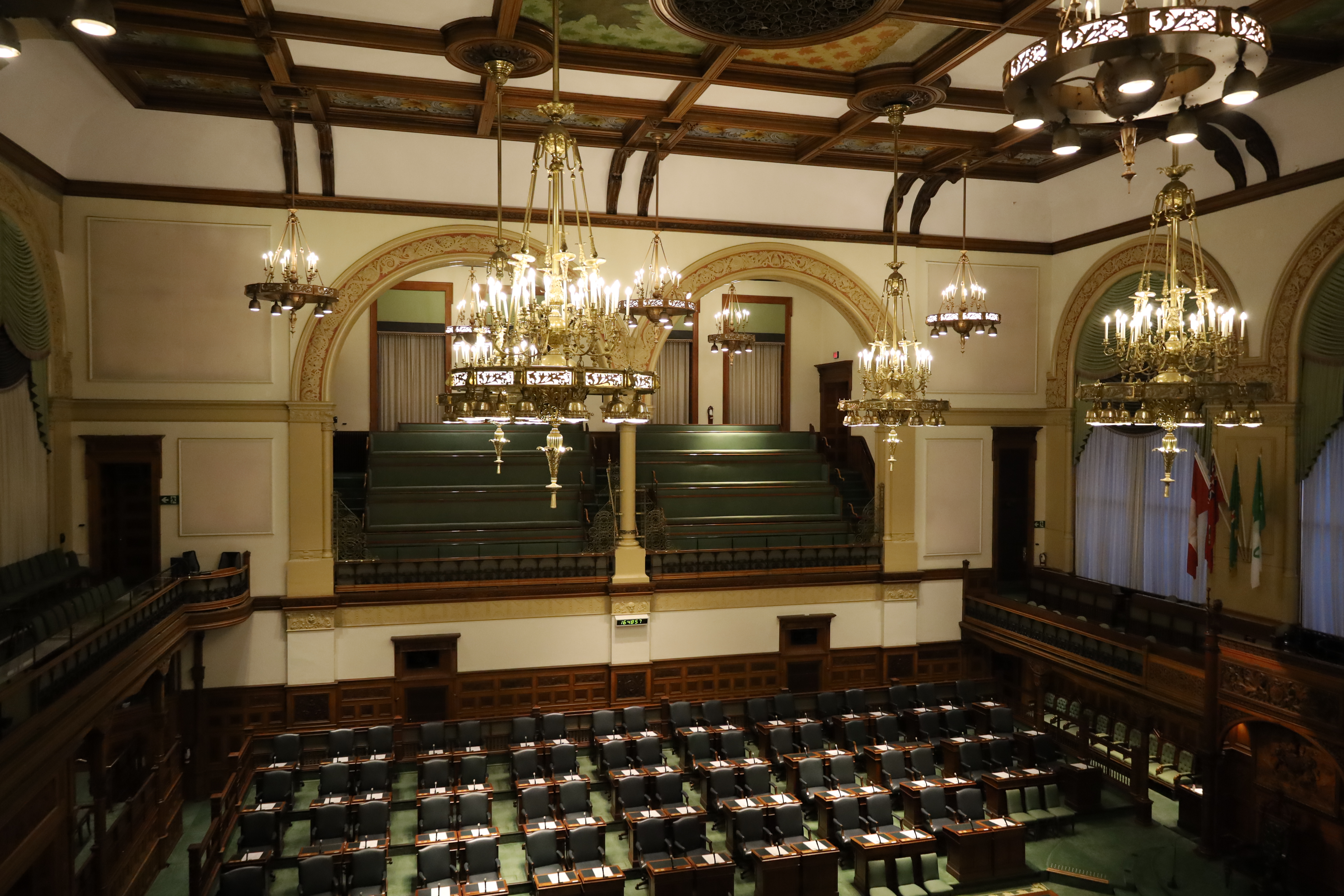
Chamber of the Legislative Assembly of Ontario in 2023

=== Formal exercise of authority ===
Like the Canadian federal government, Ontario government operates as a Westminster-style parliamentary government. As a fundamental principle of Westminster parliamentary democracy, the concept of responsible government is at the core of the government's legitimacy. The Premier of Ontario, their cabinet as a collective and ministers individually are accountable to the legislature, and may only remain in office with the support of the legislature. In most cases, a new premier emerges to form a new government, formally called a ministry, by nature of being the leader of the party that have won the largest number of seats in the legislature in a general election, or by having secured the leadership of the largest party midway through a parliamentary term. Only twice in Ontario history, in 1871 and 1985, did transition of power occur immediately following the adoptions of motion of no confidence. In both instances the incumbent governments failed at the earliest opportunity available to opposition to test the government's command of confidence after a general election.

The British North America Act assigned jurisdiction over specific policy areas exclusively to either the federal government or the provincial government. On matters under provincial jurisdiction, the Government of Ontario exercises its authorities independently from the federal government of Canada and is accountable only to the legislature.

=== Governing in practice ===
Most laws originate in the provincial cabinet (government bills) and are passed by the legislature after multiple rounds of debate and decision-making. Backbench legislators may introduce private legislation (private-member bills) or amend bills presented to the legislature by cabinet, playing a role in scrutinizing bills both at the debate as well as committee stages.

In the Ontario legislature, this confrontation provides much of the material for Oral Questions and Members' Statements. Legislative scrutiny of the executive is also at the heart of much of the work carried out by the Legislature's Standing Committees, which are made up of ordinary backbenchers.

A member's day will typically be divided among participating in the business of the House, attending caucus and committee meetings, speaking in various debates, or returning to his or her constituency to address the concerns, problems and grievances of constituents. Depending on personal inclination and political circumstances, some Members concentrate most of their attention on House matters while others focus on constituency problems, taking on something of an ombudsman's role in the process.

=== Government front bench ===
The member of the cabinet (alternatively known in academic literature and government documents as the "ministry", the "executive council" or the "council of ministers") are traditionally drawn from the government caucus. Only one former ministry, the Drury ministry formed in 1919, have drawn their members from more than one party. All other Ontario ministries, including those with only minority mandates, were made up of members from a single party.

Members of the ministry are expected to adhere to the principle of cabinet collective responsibility and vote in support of the government's position on all matters. The government's executive being present as members of the legislature is an inherent conflict in the Westminster system, (Note: In theory, the head of the government may simply appoint ministers into secure their support for the government's position.) a conflict explicitly acknowledged in the Legislative Assembly Act with a provision exempting ministers from disqualification.

== History ==
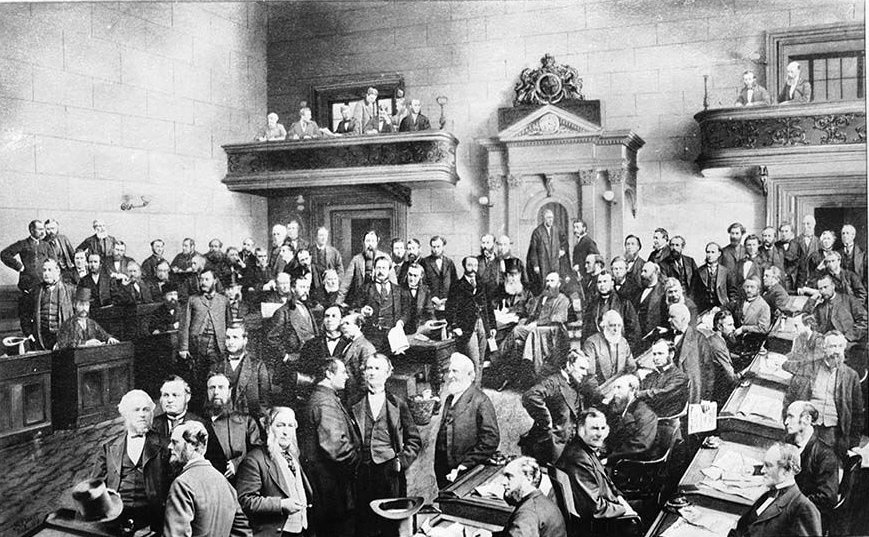
Members of the Legislative Assembly of Ontario convene in 1871.

The Legislative Assembly was established by the British North America Act, 1867 (later re-titled Constitution Act, 1867), which dissolved the Province of Canada into two new provinces, with the portion then called Canada West becoming Ontario. As such, the 1st Parliament of Ontario was one of the three legislative bodies succeeding the Legislative Assembly of the Province of Canada's 8th Parliament (the other two being the Parliament of Canada and the Quebec National Assembly.)

The first election in 1867 produced a tie between Conservatives led by John Sandfield Macdonald and the Liberals led by Archibald McKellar. Macdonald led a coalition government with the support of moderate Liberals. John Stevenson served as the first speaker for the assembly. Its first session ran from September 3, 1867, until February 25, 1871, just prior to the 1871 general election.

The Legislature has been unicameral since its inception, with the Assembly currently having 124 seats (increased from 107 as of the 42nd Ontario general election) representing electoral districts ("ridings") elected through a first-past-the-post electoral system across the province.

In 1938, the title of Member of the Legislative Assembly was officially changed to Member of Provincial Parliament. Previously, multiple terms were unofficially used in the media and in the Legislature.

Ontario uses the same boundaries as those at the federal level for its Legislative Assembly in Southern Ontario, while seats in Northern Ontario correspond to the federal districts that were in place before the 2004 adjustment. Ontario had separate provincial electoral districts prior to 1999.

In 2020, the Legislative Assembly brought in a tradition that on every first Monday of a month, the members will sing the Royal anthem of Canada "God Save the King" and the national anthem "O Canada".

Members had the option to address the Speaker and conduct official debates in either English or French, until March 2024, when members were allowed "to also address the Speaker in an Indigenous language spoken in Canada", in addition to French and English. They are asked to let the clerk know in advance, to allow for translation and interpretation services to prepare. The first person to do so was Sol Mamakwa, MPP for Kiiwetinoong, speaking in Anishininiimowin, also known as Oji-Cree, on May 28 that year.

== Operations ==
=== Officers ===
References of officers in relations to the legislative assembly may be in reference to:

- the five MPPs who serve as presiding officers of the assembly, namely the Speaker, deputy speaker, the first, second and third vice chairs of the committee of the whole house
- the two senior members of the non-partisan staff of the Office of the Assembly, namely the Clerk of the Assembly and the Sergeant-at-Arms, as recognized by legislation
- the six independent officers accountable directly to the legislature

==== Office of the Assembly ====
The Office of the Assembly, staffed with non-partisan employees, provides administrative and corporate support to the assembly. It was created in response to recommendations contained in the second report of the Ontario Commission on the Legislature. At the time, the Ministry of Government Services serviced the administrative needs of the legislator and paid for the assembly's operation out of the ministry budget. The commission, chaired by Davis's campaign strategist Dalton Camp with former Liberal leader Farquhar Oliver and former federal NDP leader Doug Fisher as commission, highlighted the conflict of interest from the legislature being subject to the financial control of a ministry it was supposed to exercise governance oversight over. It urged the creation of a department-like administration with statutory independence from the government for the purpose of servicing the assembly with the Speaker as the executive head and the clerk as the administrative head. It further recommend the establishment of the legislative precinct and charge the Sergeant-at-Arms with the administration the precinct's security.

The Office of the Assembly was created in 1974 with many of the administrative departments proposed by the commission implemented. The Clerk of the Legislative Assembly thus serves the duo-roles of being the principal advisor to the assembly on questions of procedure or interpretation of the rules and practices of the House and the senior permanent officer of the assembly staff responsible for administering the legislature and servicing the legislators. The Sergeant-at-Arms serves both the traditional symbolic role for keeping order inside the chamber while it is session, as symbolized by his custody and control of the ceremonial mace in the legislature, and the practical role of safeguarding the physical security of members against intimation or interference from any sources while presence at the legislative precinct. In accordance to the commission report, the roles of the Clerk and of the Sergeant-at-Arms, along with the independence of the staff they lead, were given formal recognition in the Legislative Assembly Act.

==== Independent officers of the assembly ====
Six officers are appointed by the legislative assembly and report to the legislature through the Speaker rather than to the provincial government. Their offices were created with specific mandates to protect specific public interests and to assist the assembly in exercise oversight over the government.

- Auditor General of Ontario
- Chief Electoral Officer
- Financial Accountability Officer
- Information and Privacy Commissioner of Ontario
- Integrity Commissioner
- Ontario Ombudsman

The Poet Laureate of Ontario also reports to the legislative assembly.

=== Media ===
Regular Legislative Assembly proceedings are broadcast to subscribers of the Ontario Parliament Network in Ontario. A late-night rebroadcast of Question Period is also occasionally aired on TVO, the provincial public broadcaster.

== Symbols ==
=== Coat of arms ===
The Legislative Assembly of Ontario is the first and only legislature in Canada to have a coat of arms separate from the provincial arms. Prior to 1993, the assembly had used the coat of arms of the Government of Ontario.

A distinct coat of arms for the legislature was adopted in 1993, as part of the celebration of the bicentennial of the first meeting of the Legislative Assembly of Upper Canada at Newark (Niagara-on-the-Lake) on September 17, 1792. A petition was made by the then-Speaker, David William Warner, to the Chief Herald of Canada for the granting of a unique coat of arms which would emphasize the distinctive character of the Legislative Assembly of Ontario and distinguish the assembly's identity from the government's. The petition was granted and the new coat of arms was presented by then Governor-General Ramon Hnatyshyn at a ceremony in the Legislative Chamber on April 26, 1993.

==== Symbolism ====
Green and gold are the principal colours used in the arms, as in the coat of arms of Ontario.

Element	Description
Crest	The crest has a green griffin holding a gold calumet. The griffin is an ancient symbol of justice and equity. The calumet symbolizes the meeting of spirit and discussion that Ontario's first peoples believe accompanies the use of the pipe.
Coronet	The coronet on the wreath represents national and provincial loyalties. Its rim is studded with the provincial gemstone (amethyst), and the coronet is topped with three red maple leaves (symbolizing Canada) and two white trilliums (the flower of Ontario).
Shield	The shield of arms consists of two crossed maces, joined by the shield of arms of Ontario, on a field of green with a gold rim. The mace is the traditional symbol of the authority of the Speaker. Shown on the left is the current mace. On the right is the original from the time of the first parliament in 1792.
Supporters	A white-tailed doe (dexter) and a white-tailed stag (sinister), which are native to Canada. These animals represent the natural riches of the province. The Loyalist coronets at their necks honour the original European settlers in Ontario who brought with them the parliamentary form of government. The Royal Crowns, left 1992, right 1792, recognize the parliamentary bicentennial and recall Ontario's heritage as a constitutional monarchy. They were granted as a special honour by Her Majesty Queen Elizabeth II on the recommendation of the Governor General.
Compartment	In the base, the maple leaves are for Canada, the white trilliums for Ontario and the roses for York (now Toronto), the provincial capital.
Motto	The motto is "Audi alteram partem", one of a series of Latin phrases carved in the Chamber of the Ontario Legislative Building. It challenges MPPs to "hear the other side". The other Latin phrase is: "Animo non astutia", which translates to "by courage, not cunning" or "by spirit, not craft".

=== Mace ===
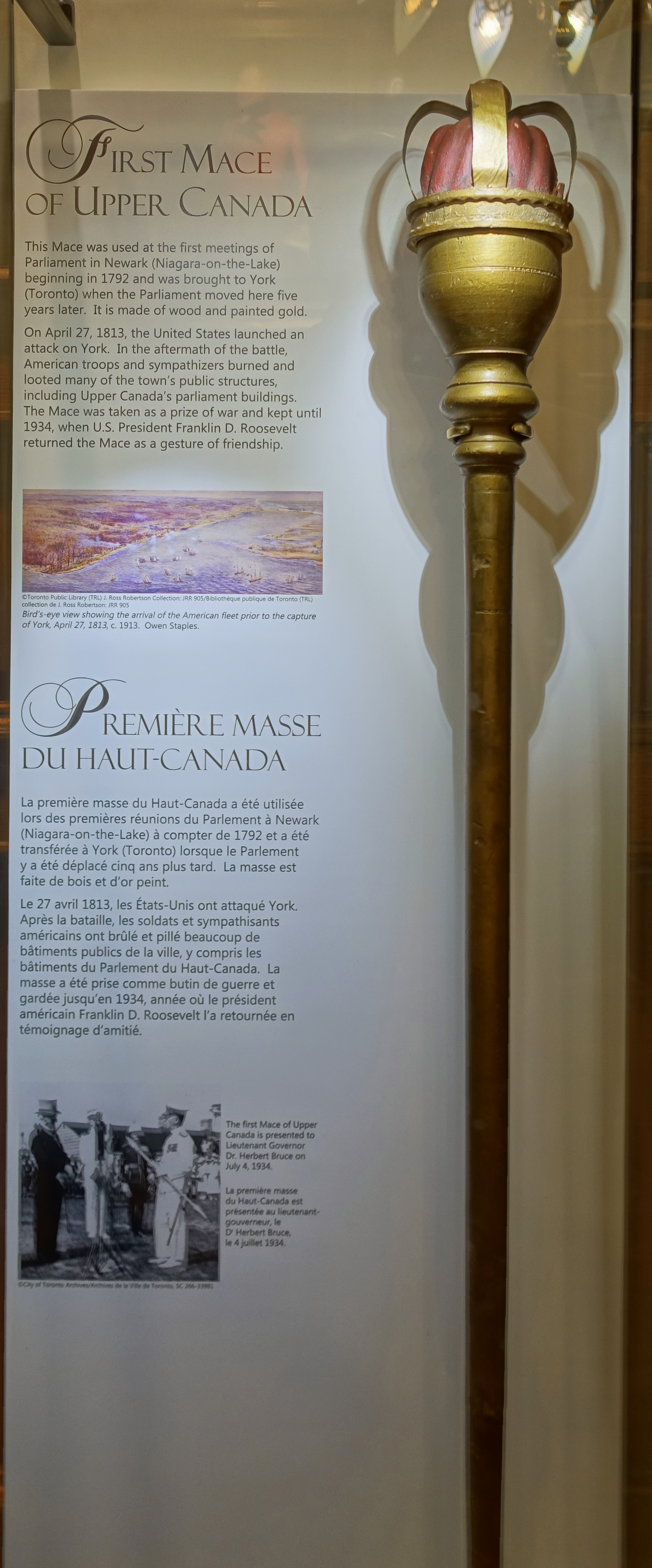
The first mace used by the Upper Canadian Legislature.

The ceremonial mace of the Legislature is the fourth mace to be used in Upper Canada or Ontario. It acts as a symbol, representing the authority of the Speaker of the Legislative Assembly of Ontario to oversee the proceedings of the assembly.

The first mace was used by the Chamber of Upper Canada's first Parliament in 1792 at Newark (now Niagara-on-the-Lake) and then moved to York (now Toronto). The primitive wooden mace was painted red and gilt, and surmounted by a crown of thin brass strips. It was stolen by American troops as a Prize of War in 1813 at the Battle of York during the War of 1812. The mace was subsequently stored at the United States Naval Academy in Annapolis, Maryland. It remained in the United States until 1934, when it was returned to Ontario after President Franklin Roosevelt sent an order to Congress to return the mace. It was initially kept at the Royal Ontario Museum for a time, and it is now located in the Main Lobby of the Ontario Legislative Building.

A second mace was introduced in 1813 and used until 1841.

The third mace was not purchased until 1845. In 1849, it was stolen by a riotous mob in Montreal, apparently intent upon destroying it in a public demonstration. However, it was rescued and returned to the Speaker, Sir Allan Macnab, the next day. Later, in 1854, the mace was twice rescued when the Parliament Buildings in Quebec were ravaged by fire. The mace continued to be used by the Union Parliament in Toronto and Quebec until Confederation in 1867, when it was taken to the Parliament of Canada in Ottawa, where it remained in the House of Commons until 1916. When the Parliament Buildings were gutted by fire during that year, the mace could not be saved from Centre Block. All that remained was a tiny ball of silver and gold conglomerate.

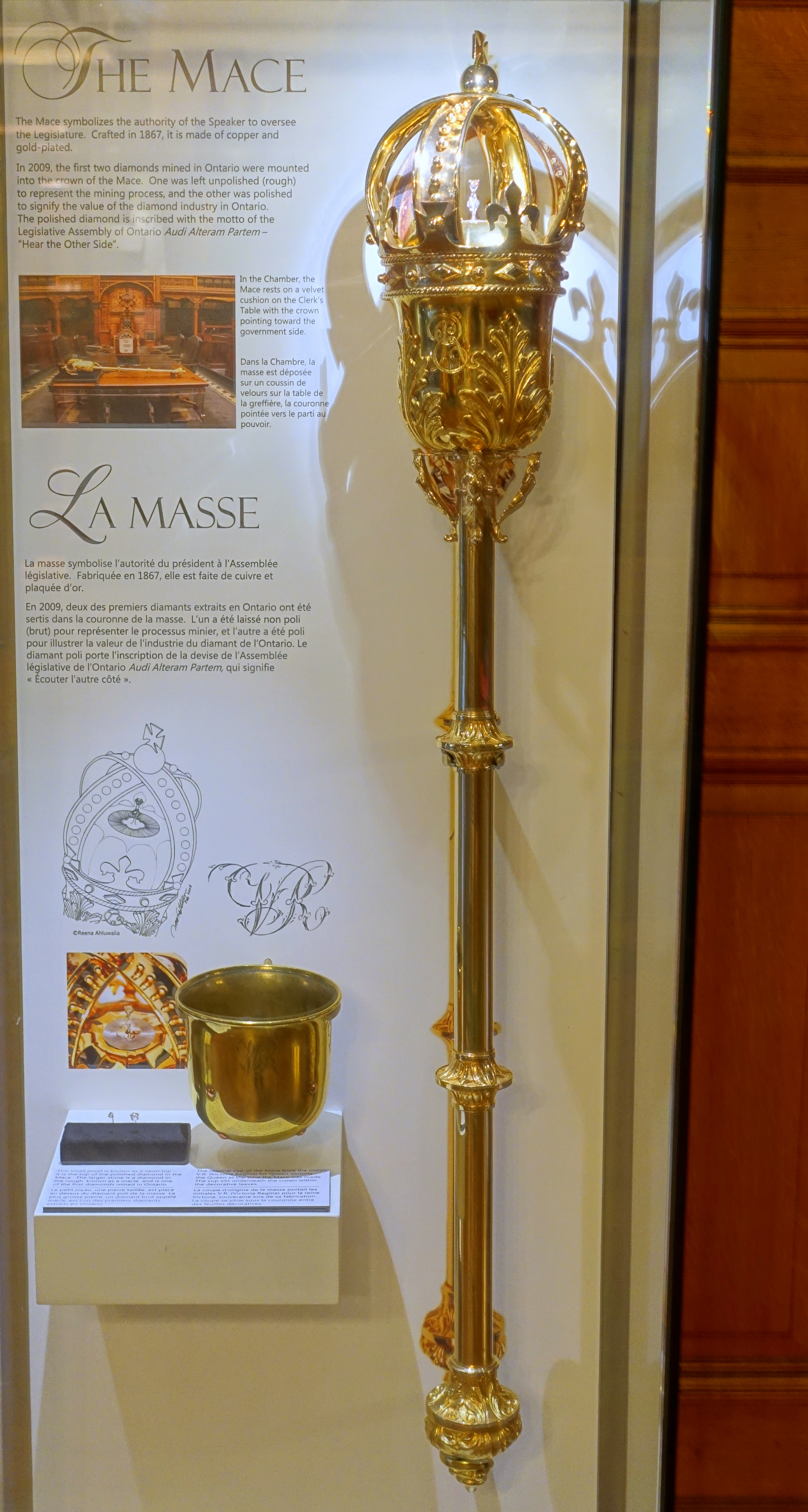
The fourth, and current, mace used by the Legislature.

The current mace used in the Legislative Assembly of Ontario was acquired in 1867, after Confederation. It was provided by Charles E. Zollikofer of Ottawa for $200. The four-foot mace is made of copper and richly gilded, a flattened ball at the butt end. Initially, the head of the mace bore the crown of Queen Victoria and in a cup with her royal cypher, V.R. When she was succeeded by Edward VII in 1901, her crown and cup were removed and a new one bearing Edward's cypher on the cup was installed. Eventually, it was replaced with the current cup, which is adorned in gleaming brass leaves.

After some research by the Legislative Assembly staff, the original cup with Queen Victoria's cypher was recently found in the Royal Ontario Museum's collection and returned to the Legislature. It is now on display in the Ontario Legislative Building.

In 2009, two diamonds were installed in the mace. The diamonds were a gift to the people of Ontario from De Beers Canada to mark the opening of the Victor Mine near Attawapiskat in northern Ontario. Three diamonds were selected from the first run of the mine. Two stones, one rough and one polished, were set in platinum in the crown of the mace while the third stone, also polished, was put on exhibit in the lobby of the Legislative Building as part of a display about the history of the mace.

== The Current legislature ==
=== Party standings ===
Ontario general elections most recently took place on February 27, 2025, as a result of which the Progressive Conservative Party of Ontario, led by Doug Ford, was re-elected and continues to lead the Government of Ontario with a majority mandate.

Affiliation	Party leader	Status	Seats	
Affiliation	Party leader	Status	2025 election	Current
Progressive Conservative	Doug Ford	Government	80	79
New Democratic	Marit Stiles	Official Opposition	27	27
Liberal	Navdeep Bains	Third party	14	14
Green	Mike Schreiner	No party status	2	2
Independent	N/A	No party status	1	2
Total			124	
Government Majority			36	36

=== Presiding officers ===
- Speaker of the Legislative Assembly of Ontario: Donna Skelly (Progressive Conservative)
  - Deputy Speaker and Chair of the Committee of the Whole House: Effie Triantafilopoulos (Progressive Conservative)
  - First Deputy Chairs of the Committee of the Whole House: Jennifer French (New Democratic)
  - Second Deputy Chairs of the Committee of the Whole House: Ric Bresee (Progressive Conservative)
  - Third Deputy Chairs of the Committee of the Whole House: Andrea Hazell (Liberal)

=== Leaders ===
- Premier of Ontario: Doug Ford (Progressive Conservative)
- Leader of the Opposition: Marit Stiles (New Democratic)
- Parliamentary leader of the Liberal Party: John Fraser (as Navdeep Bains does not have a seat)

(Green Party leader Mike Schreiner is a member but is currently not a recognized party leader)

=== Floor leaders ===
- Government House Leader: Steve Clark (Progressive Conservative)
- Opposition House Leader: John Vanthof (NDP)
- Third Party House Leader: Lucille Collard (Liberal)

=== Whips ===
- Chief Government Whip: Matthew Rae (Progressive Conservative)
- Official Opposition Whip: Peggy Sattler (NDP)
- Third Party Whip: Adil Shamji (Liberal)

=== Front benches ===
- Executive Council of Ontario
- Official Opposition Shadow Cabinet of the 44th Legislative Assembly of Ontario
- Ontario Liberal Party Shadow Cabinet of the 44th Legislative Assembly of Ontario

=== Seating plan ===
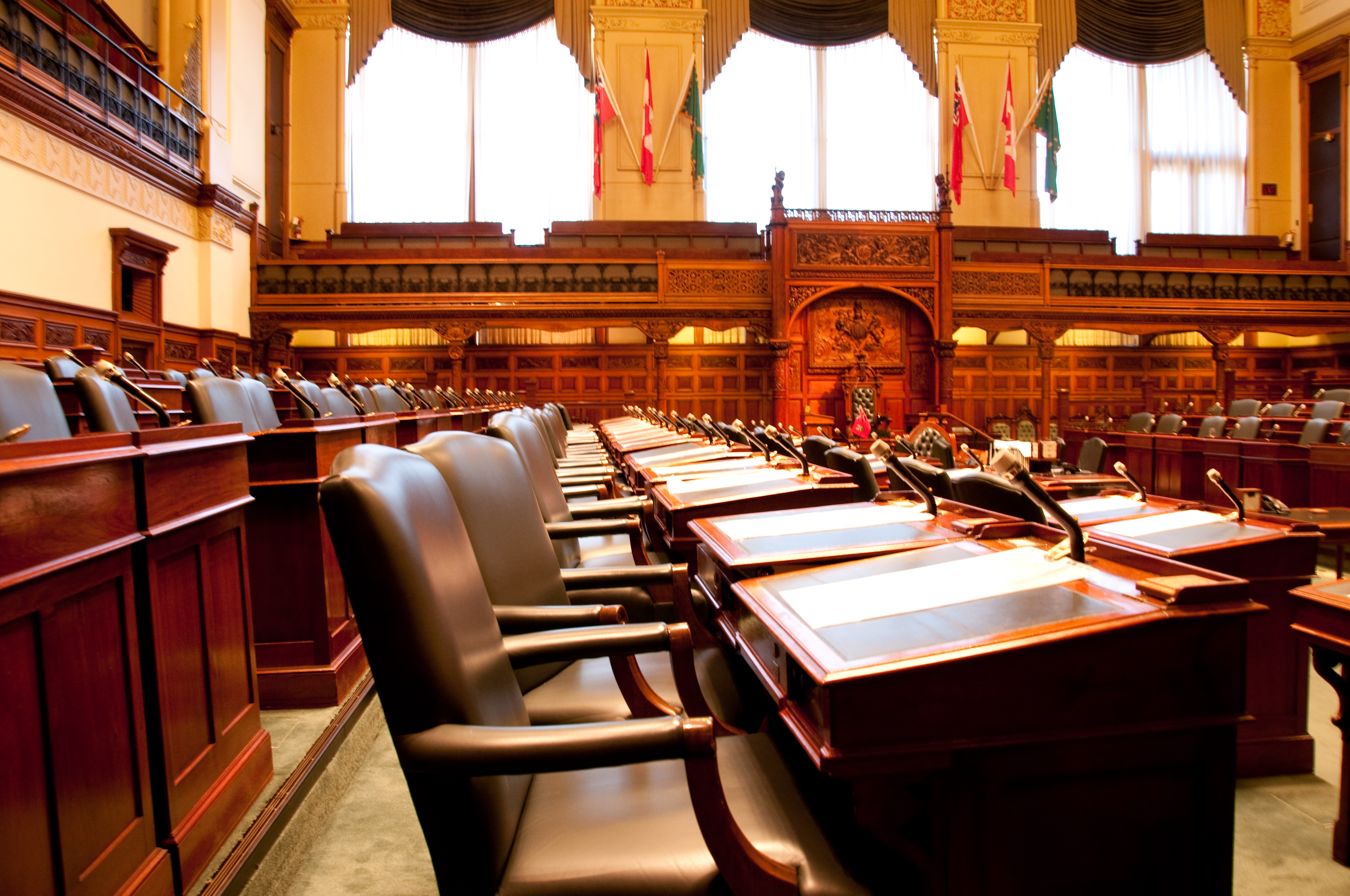
The seating chamber for the Legislative Assembly features individual chairs and desks for its members.

The seating chamber is similar in layout to that of the British House of Commons and the original St. Stephen's Chapel in the Palace of Westminster. The Parliament of Ontario, however, may be easily distinguished from this model by its use of individual chairs and tables for members, absent in the British Commons' design.

The legislature's former host building and site, home to the Upper Canada and Union Houses, once boasted of a similar layout.

			McKenney	Gilmour	Lennox				Fairclough	Cerjanec			Denault	Racinsky		Clancy
Rakocevic	Vaugeois	Wong-Tam	Gates	Gretzky	Shaw	Bourgouin	Stevens	Glover	Hazell	McCrimmon	Tsao	Watt	Darouze	Rosenberg		Brady
Armstrong	Gélinas	Kernaghan	West	Pasma	Bell	Fife	Burch	French	McMahon	Bowman	Smyth	Hsu	Gualtieri	C. Scott	Firin	Schreiner
			Tabuns	Sattler	Vanthof	Stiles	Mamakwa	Begum	Fraser	Shamji	Collard	Blais	Cooper	Vickers	Ciriello	Bresee
Skelly
			Clark	Lecce	Mulroney	Calandra	Fedeli	Ford	S. Jones	Bethlenfalvy	Sarkaria	Downey	R. Cho	Surma	Rickford	Kerzner	Harris
Rae	Crawford	Kusendova-Bashta	McCarthy	Quinn	Khanjin	Lumsden	S. Cho	Williams	Parsa	Tangri	Piccini	Flack	McGregor	Dunlop	T. Jones	Pirie	Thompson
G. Smith	Leardi	Pierre	L. Scott	Bailey	Coe	Tibollo	Holland	Oosterhoff	Hamid	Thanigasalam	Sandhu	L. Smith	Triantafilopoulos	Pang	Cuzzetto	Babikian	Hardeman
Allsopp	Jordan	Anand	Saunderson	Bouma	Dave Smith	Wai	Dowie	Grewal	Sarrazin	Pinsonneault	Riddell	David Smith		Murphy	Kanapathi	Sabawy	Dixon

Note: Bold text designates the party leader.

=== Membership changes ===
seat changed hand after by-election
involuntary departure

Progressive Conservative
Liberal Green

New Democratic
Independent

43rd Ontario Parliament (2022–25) - Membership and party affiliation changes
Electoral District	Before			Change	
Electoral District	Date	Reason	Member exited	New member	Date
Sault Ste. Marie	September 22, 2025	Removal from caucus (Note: following arrest for charges of domestic assault and assault with a weapon)	Chris Scott		
Scarborough Southwest	February 3, 2026	Resignation (Note: to contest federal by-election as a federal Liberal candidate)	Doly Begum	Fatima Shaban	September 3, 2026
York—Simcoe	June 5, 2026	Resignation	Caroline Mulroney	Susan Lahey	September 3, 2026
Hamilton East—Stoney Creek	June 5, 2026	Resignation	Neil Lumsden	Jeff Beattie	September 3, 2026

== List of members ==
Electoral district	Name	Party	First elected / Previously elected	No. of terms	Note
Ajax	Robert Cerjanec	Liberal	2025	1st term	
Algoma—Manitoulin	Bill Rosenberg	Progressive Conservative	2025	1st term	
Aurora—Oak Ridges—Richmond Hill	Michael Parsa	Progressive Conservative	2018	3rd term	
Barrie—Innisfil	Andrea Khanjin	Progressive Conservative	2018	3rd term	
Barrie—Springwater—Oro-Medonte	Doug Downey	Progressive Conservative	2018	3rd term	
Bay of Quinte	Tyler Allsopp	Progressive Conservative	2024	2nd term	
Beaches—East York	Mary-Margaret McMahon	Liberal	2022	2nd term	
Brampton Centre	Charmaine Williams	Progressive Conservative	2022	2nd term	
Brampton East	Hardeep Grewal	Progressive Conservative	2022	2nd term	
Brampton North	Graham McGregor	Progressive Conservative	2022	2nd term	
Brampton South	Prabmeet Sarkaria	Progressive Conservative	2018	3rd term	
Brampton West	Amarjot Sandhu	Progressive Conservative	2018	3rd term	
Brantford—Brant	Will Bouma	Progressive Conservative	2018	3rd term	
Bruce—Grey—Owen Sound	Paul Vickers	Progressive Conservative	2025	1st term	
Burlington	Natalie Pierre	Progressive Conservative	2022	2nd term	
Cambridge	Brian Riddell	Progressive Conservative	2022	2nd term	
Carleton	George Darouze	Progressive Conservative	2025	1st term	
Chatham-Kent—Leamington	Trevor Jones	Progressive Conservative	2022	2nd term	
Davenport	Marit Stiles	New Democratic	2018	3rd term	
Don Valley East	Adil Shamji	Liberal	2022	2nd term	
Don Valley North	Jonathan Tsao	Liberal	2025	1st term	
Don Valley West	Stephanie Bowman	Liberal	2022	2nd term	
Dufferin—Caledon	Sylvia Jones	Progressive Conservative	2007	6th term	
Durham	Todd McCarthy	Progressive Conservative	2022	2nd term	
Eglinton—Lawrence	Michelle Cooper	Progressive Conservative	2025	1st term	
Elgin—Middlesex—London	Rob Flack	Progressive Conservative	2022	2nd term	
Essex	Anthony Leardi	Progressive Conservative	2022	2nd term	
Etobicoke Centre	Kinga Surma	Progressive Conservative	2018	3rd term	
Etobicoke—Lakeshore	Lee Fairclough	Liberal	2025	1st term	
Etobicoke North	Doug Ford	Progressive Conservative	2018	3rd term	
Flamborough—Glanbrook	Donna Skelly	Progressive Conservative	2018	3rd term	
Glengarry—Prescott—Russell	Stéphane Sarrazin	Progressive Conservative	2022	2nd term	
Guelph	Mike Schreiner	Green	2018	3rd term	
Haldimand—Norfolk	Bobbi Ann Brady	Independent	2022	2nd term	
Haliburton—Kawartha Lakes—Brock	Laurie Scott	Progressive Conservative	2003, 2011	7th term*	
Hamilton Centre	Robin Lennox	New Democratic	2025	1st term	
Hamilton East—Stoney Creek	Neil Lumsden (Until August 4, 2026)	Progressive Conservative	2022	2nd term	Resignation: August 4, 2026
Hamilton East—Stoney Creek	Jeff Beattie (From September 3, 2026)	Progressive Conservative	2026	1st term	By-election: September 3, 2026
Hamilton Mountain	Monica Ciriello	Progressive Conservative	2025	1st term	
Hamilton West—Ancaster—Dundas	Sandy Shaw	New Democratic	2018	3rd term	
Hastings—Lennox and Addington	Ric Bresee	Progressive Conservative	2022	2nd term	
Humber River—Black Creek	Tom Rakocevic	New Democratic	2018	3rd term	
Huron—Bruce	Lisa Thompson	Progressive Conservative	2011	5th term	
Kanata—Carleton	Karen McCrimmon	Liberal	2023	2nd term	
Kenora—Rainy River	Greg Rickford	Progressive Conservative	2018	3rd term	
Kiiwetinoong	Sol Mamakwa	New Democratic	2018	3rd term	
King—Vaughan	Stephen Lecce	Progressive Conservative	2018	3rd term	
Kingston and the Islands	Ted Hsu	Liberal	2022	2nd term	
Kitchener Centre	Aislinn Clancy	Green	2023	2nd term	
Kitchener—Conestoga	Mike Harris Jr.	Progressive Conservative	2018	3rd term	
Kitchener South—Hespeler	Jess Dixon	Progressive Conservative	2022	2nd term	
Lambton—Kent—Middlesex	Steve Pinsonneault	Progressive Conservative	2024	2nd term	
Lanark—Frontenac—Kingston	John Jordan	Progressive Conservative	2022	2nd term	
Leeds—Grenville—Thousand Islands and Rideau Lakes	Steve Clark	Progressive Conservative	2010	6th term	
London—Fanshawe	Teresa Armstrong	New Democratic	2011	5th term	
London North Centre	Terence Kernaghan	New Democratic	2018	3rd term	
London West	Peggy Sattler	New Democratic	2013	5th term	
Markham—Stouffville	Paul Calandra	Progressive Conservative	2018	3rd term	
Markham—Thornhill	Logan Kanapathi	Progressive Conservative	2018	3rd term	
Markham—Unionville	Billy Pang	Progressive Conservative	2018	3rd term	
Milton	Zee Hamid	Progressive Conservative	2024	2nd term	
Mississauga Centre	Natalia Kusendova-Bashta	Progressive Conservative	2018	3rd term	
Mississauga East—Cooksville	Silvia Gualtieri	Progressive Conservative	2025	1st term	
Mississauga—Erin Mills	Sheref Sabawy	Progressive Conservative	2018	3rd term	
Mississauga—Lakeshore	Rudy Cuzzetto	Progressive Conservative	2018	3rd term	
Mississauga—Malton	Deepak Anand	Progressive Conservative	2018	3rd term	
Mississauga—Streetsville	Nina Tangri	Progressive Conservative	2018	3rd term	
Mushkegowuk—James Bay	Guy Bourgouin	New Democratic	2018	3rd term	
Nepean	Tyler Watt	Liberal	2025	1st term	
Newmarket—Aurora	Dawn Gallagher Murphy	Progressive Conservative	2022	2nd term	
Niagara Centre	Jeff Burch	New Democratic	2018	3rd term	
Niagara Falls	Wayne Gates	New Democratic	2014	5th term	
Niagara West	Sam Oosterhoff	Progressive Conservative	2016	4th term	
Nickel Belt	France Gélinas	New Democratic	2007	6th term	
Nipissing	Vic Fedeli	Progressive Conservative	2011	5th term	
Northumberland—Peterborough South	David Piccini	Progressive Conservative	2018	3rd term	
Oakville	Stephen Crawford	Progressive Conservative	2018	3rd term	
Oakville North—Burlington	Effie Triantafilopoulos	Progressive Conservative	2018	3rd term	
Orléans	Stephen Blais	Liberal	2020	3rd term	
Oshawa	Jennifer French	New Democratic	2014	4th term	
Ottawa Centre	Catherine McKenney	New Democratic	2025	1st term	
Ottawa South	John Fraser	Liberal	2013	5th term	
Ottawa—Vanier	Lucille Collard	Liberal	2020	3rd term	
Ottawa West—Nepean	Chandra Pasma	New Democratic	2022	2nd term	
Oxford	Ernie Hardeman	Progressive Conservative	1995	9th term	
Parkdale—High Park	Alexa Gilmour	New Democratic	2025	1st term	
Parry Sound—Muskoka	Graydon Smith	Progressive Conservative	2022	2nd term	
Perth—Wellington	Matthew Rae	Progressive Conservative	2022	2nd term	
Peterborough—Kawartha	Dave Smith	Progressive Conservative	2018	3rd term	
Pickering—Uxbridge	Peter Bethlenfalvy	Progressive Conservative	2018	3rd term	
Renfrew—Nipissing—Pembroke	Billy Denault	Progressive Conservative	2025	1st term	
Richmond Hill	Daisy Wai	Progressive Conservative	2018	3rd term	
St. Catharines	Jennie Stevens	New Democratic	2018	3rd term	
Sarnia—Lambton	Bob Bailey	Progressive Conservative	2007	6th term	
Sault Ste. Marie	Chris Scott	Progressive Conservative	2025	1st term	
Sault Ste. Marie	Chris Scott	Independent (Note: since September 2025)	2025	1st term	
Scarborough—Agincourt	Aris Babikian	Progressive Conservative	2018	3rd term	
Scarborough Centre	David Smith	Progressive Conservative	2022	2nd term	
Scarborough—Guildwood	Andrea Hazell	Liberal	2023	2nd term	
Scarborough North	Raymond Cho	Progressive Conservative	2016	4th term	
Scarborough—Rouge Park	Vijay Thanigasalam	Progressive Conservative	2018	3rd term	
Scarborough Southwest	Doly Begum (Until February 3, 2026)	New Democratic	2018	3rd term	Resignation: February 3, 2026
Scarborough Southwest	Fatima Shaban (From September 3, 2026)	New Democratic	2026	1st term	By-election: September 3, 2026
Simcoe—Grey	Brian Saunderson	Progressive Conservative	2022	2nd term	
Simcoe North	Jill Dunlop	Progressive Conservative	2018	3rd term	
Spadina—Fort York	Chris Glover	New Democratic	2018	3rd term	
Stormont—Dundas—South Glengarry	Nolan Quinn	Progressive Conservative	2022	2nd term	
Sudbury	Jamie West	New Democratic	2018	3rd term	
Thornhill	Laura Smith	Progressive Conservative	2022	2nd term	
Thunder Bay—Atikokan	Kevin Holland	Progressive Conservative	2022	2nd term	
Thunder Bay—Superior North	Lise Vaugeois	New Democratic	2022	2nd term	
Timiskaming—Cochrane	John Vanthof	New Democratic	2011	5th term	
Timmins	George Pirie	Progressive Conservative	2022	2nd term	
Toronto Centre	Kristyn Wong-Tam	New Democratic	2022	2nd term	
Toronto—Danforth	Peter Tabuns (Note: Interim Leader of the New Democratic Party and Leader of the Opposition from June 28, 2022 to February 4, 2023.)	New Democratic	2006	7th term	
Toronto—St. Paul's	Stephanie Smyth	Liberal	2025	1st term	
University—Rosedale	Jessica Bell	New Democratic	2018	3rd term	
Vaughan—Woodbridge	Michael Tibollo	Progressive Conservative	2018	3rd term	
Waterloo	Catherine Fife	New Democratic	2012	5th term	
Wellington—Halton Hills	Joseph Racinsky	Progressive Conservative	2025	1st term	
Whitby	Lorne Coe	Progressive Conservative	2016	4th term	
Willowdale	Stan Cho	Progressive Conservative	2018	3rd term	
Windsor—Tecumseh	Andrew Dowie	Progressive Conservative	2022	2nd term	
Windsor West	Lisa Gretzky	New Democratic	2014	4th term	
York Centre	Michael Kerzner	Progressive Conservative	2022	2nd term	
York—Simcoe	Caroline Mulroney (Until June 5, 2026)	Progressive Conservative	2018	3rd term	Resignation: June 5, 2026
York—Simcoe	Susan Lahey (From September 3, 2026)	Progressive Conservative	2026	1st term	By-election: September 3, 2026
York South—Weston	Mohamed Firin	Progressive Conservative	2025	1st term	

== Committees ==
Committees are subgroups consist of up to nine MPPs tasked with review of specific legislations or policies as delegated by the legislative assembly. The assembly has two types of committees. Standing committees specifically provided for in the Standing Orders and are struck for the duration of the parliamentary term. Select committees are struck usually by a motion or an order of the assembly to consider a specific bill or issue.

The following are the eight standing committees in the current 44th parliament prescribed by the Standing Orders

- Standing committee on Finance and Economic Affairs
- Standing Committee on Government Agencies
- Standing Committee on Heritage, Infrastructure and Cultural Policy
- Standing Committee on the Interior
- Standing Committee on Justice Policy
- Standing Committee on Procedure and House Affairs
- Standing Committee on Public Accounts
- Standing Committee on Social Policy

As of June 2026, there has been no select committee struck in the 44th parliament. No select committee was struck during the 43rd parliament (2022–25). Two such committees were struck during the 42nd (2018–22):

- Select Committee on Emergency Management Oversight (terminated at dissolution)
- Select Committee on Financial Transparency (final report tabled March 26, 2019)

Examples of other select committee from previous parliaments includes

- Select Committee on Elections (in the 39th parliament, report tabled on June 30, 2009)
- Select Committee on Mental Health and Addictions (in the 39th parliament, report tabled August 26, 2010)
- Select Committee on the proposed transaction of the TMX Group and the London Stock Exchange Group (in the 39th parliament, report tabled on April 19, 2011)
- Select Committee on Developmental Services (in the 40th and 41st parliament, report tabled on July 22, 2014)
- Select Committee on Sexual Violence and Harassment (41st parliament, report tabled on December 10, 2015)

== See also ==
- List of Ontario general elections
- List of Ontario Legislative Assemblies
- List of political parties in Ontario
- Office of the Legislative Assembly of Ontario
