= 42nd Parliament of Ontario =

2018–2022 term of Canadian provincial legislature

←	41st	43rd	→
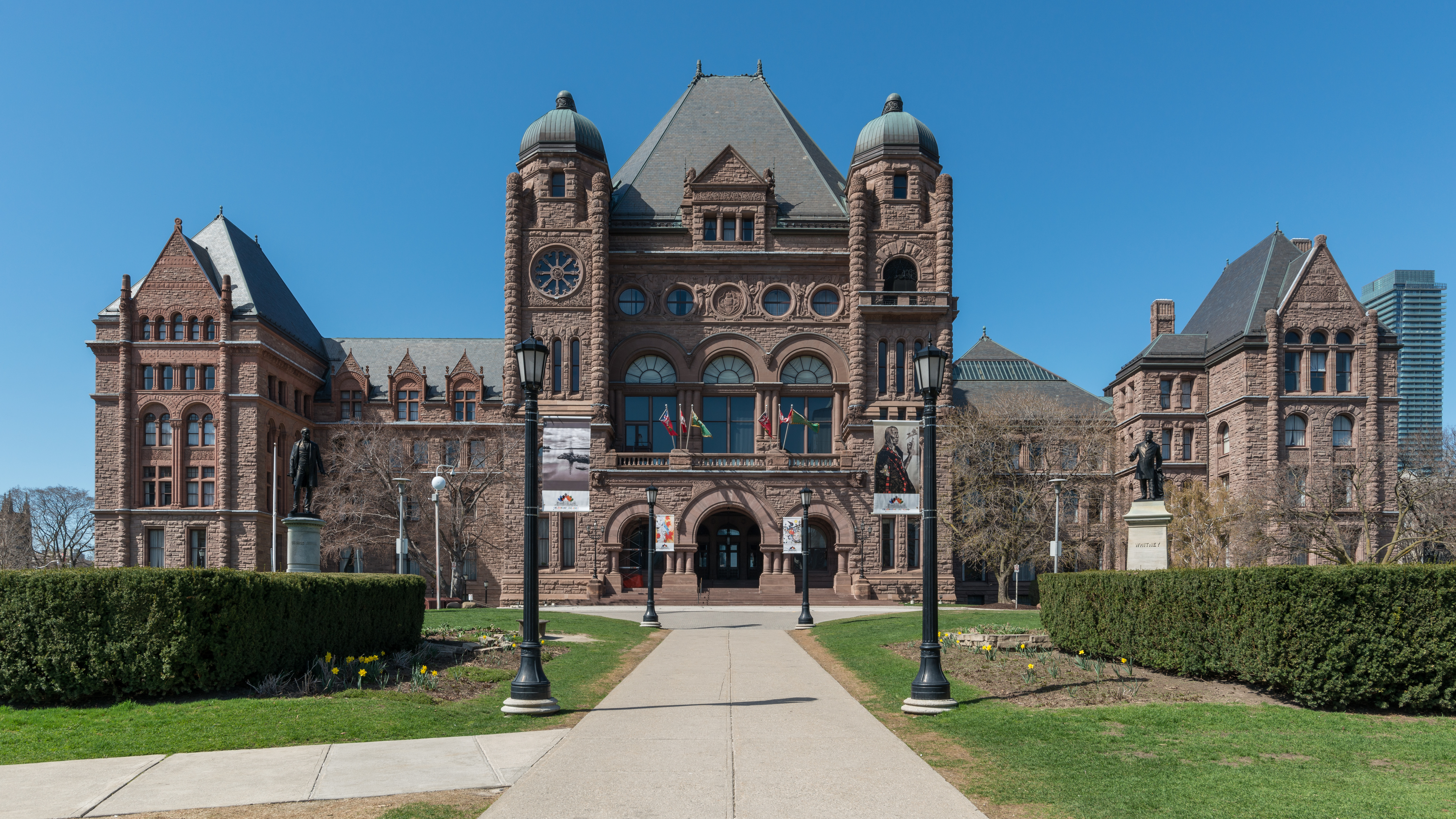
- Ontario Legislative Building, Toronto

Overview
- Legislative body: Legislative Assembly
- Jurisdiction: Ontario, Canada
- Meeting place: Ontario Legislative Building, Queen's Park, Toronto
- Term: June 7, 2018 – May 3, 2022
- Election: 2018 Ontario Election
- Government: Ford ministry, (Progressive Conservative)
- Opposition: New Democratic Party without caucus recognition: Liberal; Green
- Members: 124
- Speaker: Ted Arnott
- Premier: Doug Ford (PC)
- Leader of the Opposition: Andrea Horwath (NDP)
Party control
PC Majority: 76/124 (61%)

Sessions
- 1st: July 11, 2018 – September 12, 2021
- 2nd: October 4, 2021 – May 3, 2022

The 42nd Parliament of Ontario was the provincial legislature of the province of Ontario, Canada that was in office from 2018 to 2022. Its membership was initially determined by the Ontario general election held on June 7, 2018. The members held office until the parliament was dissolved on May 3, 2022, in advance of the 2022 Ontario general election. The 42nd Parliament sat for two sessions.

The Progressive Conservative Party led by Premier Doug Ford won a majority mandate from the 2018 election, and comfortably commanded the confidence of the parliament for its entire duration. The Official Opposition, and the only other recognized party, was the Ontario New Democratic Party led by Andrea Horwath. The Ontario Liberal Party and Green Party of Ontario also elected members, but neither elected enough members for official party status. Two additional parties, the New Blue Party of Ontario and the Ontario Party, gained representation through changes of party affiliation during this parliament, but did not reach the threshold for official party status.

The 42nd Parliament of Ontario at in two session. The first session was convened on July 11, 2018, and was in session until Parliament was prorogued on September 12, 2021. A second session session was convened on October 4, 2021, and lasted until the fixed-date dissolution of this parliament on May 3, 2022.

Ted Arnott, MPP for Wellington—Halton Hills and one of the three co-dean of the legislature having been a member of the legislature since 1990, was the Speaker of this parliament.

== Party standing ==
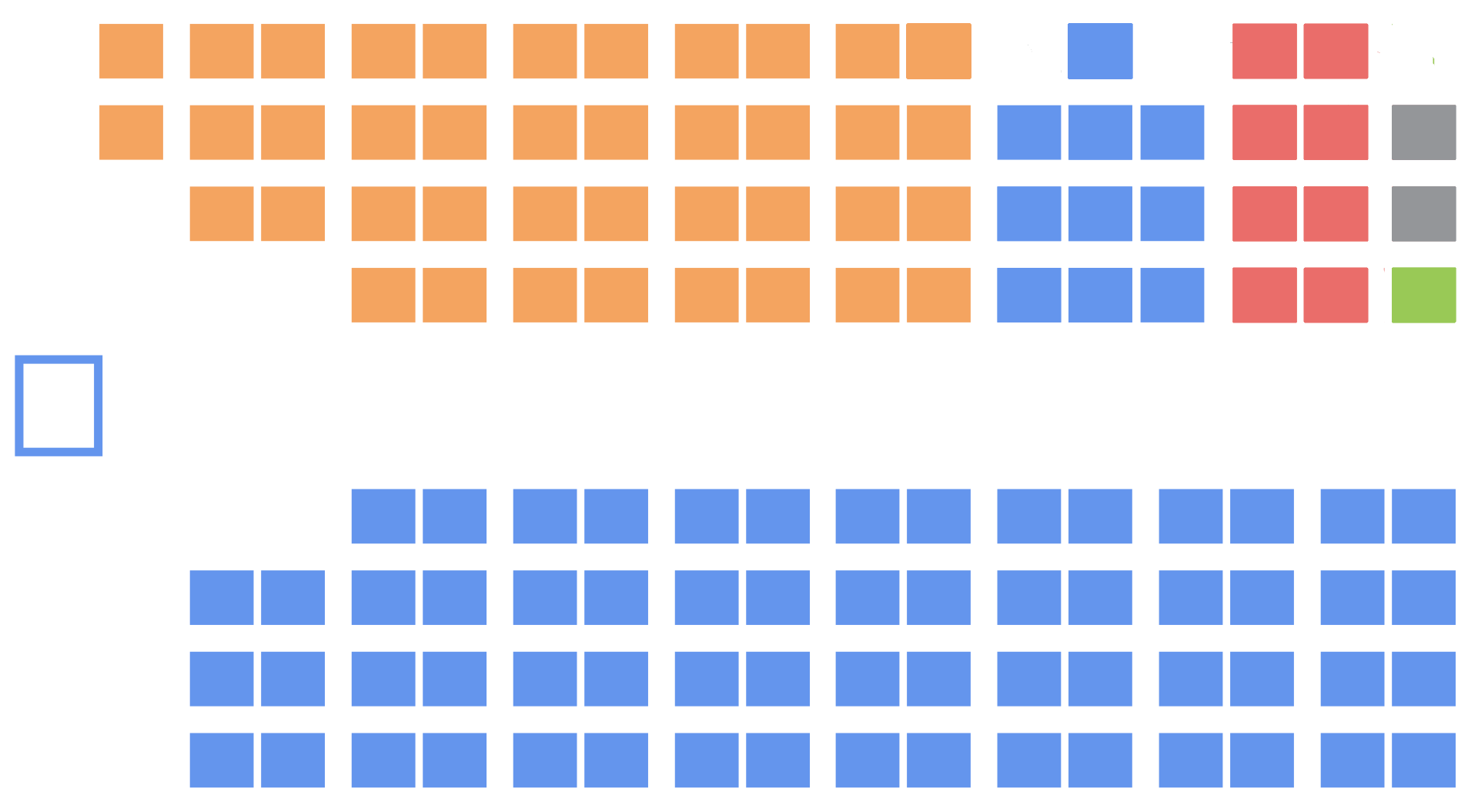
Diagram of notional seat distribution and arrangement of the 42nd Ontario Parliament, as of June 20, 2020.

The members of this parliament were elected in the general election held on June 7, 2018. The house expanded substantially, added 17 seated to its composition. The additional seat primary came from the area surrounding Toronto, which gained a whopping 8 seats, all other regions, including Toronto, saw a reduction of seat share, even if the number of seats increased. The election saw the historic defeat of the Liberal Party, returning 76 Progressive Conservative, 40 NDP, 7 Liberal, and 1 Green member. This allowed the Progressive Conservative Party (PC) to form a majority government with its leader Doug Ford, himself a rookie MPP, becoming Premier and the NDP forming the Official Opposition.

Premier Ford is only the second premier, after United Farmers Premier Ernest Drury who became premier ninety-nine years earlier, to be invited to form a government without having previously served in the legislature. Just like Drury, Ford's father was a former member of the legislature. (Note: Their respective fathers were Charles Alfred Drury (MPP 1882–90, and a minister in the Mowat ministry 1888–90) and Doug Ford Sr. (MPP 1995–99)) Unlike Drury, however, Ford was backed by a caucus with plenty of veterans, including three members with previous cabinet experience and four members who like him had fathers who were former members of the legislature. The Ford ministry was sworn in by Lieutenant Governor Elizabeth Dowdeswell on June 29, 2018.

Andrea Horwath was the third Ontario NDP leader to serve as leader of the opposition, after Stephen Lewis (1975–77) and Bob Rae (1987–90). (Note: The fourth if Cooperative Commonwealth Federation leader Ted Jolliffe was included; Jolliffe served as leader of the opposition twice, in 1943–45 and 1948–51.) Its forty-member caucus was the second largest ever, second only to the government caucus that supported the Rae ministry between 1990 and 1995, in which its house leader Gilles Bisson served.

It was the first time in the province's history for the Liberals to have insufficient seats to have its caucus recognized in the legislature. While all but one of its seven members came with previous cabinet experience, only one member, Michael Gravelle, have previously sat on the opposition bench. Its caucus would lose three of its seven members midterm, but not the former premier. While former Premier Kathleen Wynne resigned as party leader prior to election day, she served out the entire team of the parliament and acted as the party's house leader under interim leader John Fraser.

The Green Party with only one member was also not recognized in the 42nd Parliament.

=== Party standings ===
Affiliation	Leader	Status	diss. 41st	Elxn 2018	1st sess.	diss. 42nd
Progressive Conservative	Doug Ford	Government	27	76	70	67
Ontario NDP	Andrea Horwath	Official Opposition	18	40	40	38
Liberal	John Fraser (Note: Although former Premier Kathleen was reelected and completed her entire term in the 42nd Parliament, she resigned as party leader prior to the end of the 2018 election. Del Duca was elected to succeed her in March 2020. John Fraser served as interim leader prior to March 2020, and as parliamentary leader of for the entirety of the 42nd Parliament); Steven Del Duca (Note: Not as member of the 42nd Parliament)	Unrecognized	55	7	7	7
Green	Mike Schreiner	Unrecognized	–	1	1	1
New Blue	Jim Karahalios	n/a	–	–	1	1
Ontario Party	Derek Sloan	n/a	–	–	–	1
Ind.			3	–	4	6
Sitting members			103	124	123	124
Vacant			4	–	1	3
Government Majority			7	28	17	13

=== Reflecting the province's diversity ===
Of the 124 members elected in the 2018 election, forty-nine (40%) were women, a record high. At least thirty members (24%) were racialized person or of indigenous background, and at least six were identified as Franco-Ontarians.

	MPP		Women			racialized			Franco-Ontarian		
Affiliation	#	% share	#	% share	% of caucus	#	% share	% of caucus	#	% share	% of caucus
Progressive Conservative	76	61.3	25	51.0	32.9	17	56.7	22.4	1	16.6	1.3
Ontario NDP	40	32.3	20	40.8	50.0	11	36.7	27.5	3	50.0	7.5
Liberal	7	5.6	4	8.1	57.1	2	6.7	28.6	2	33.3	28.6
Green	1	0.8	0	—	—	0	—	—	0	—	—
Total	124		49		39.5	30		24.2	6		4.8
	#	% of caucus	#	% of cabinet	% of women PC	#	% of cabinet	% of racialized PC	#	% of cabinet	% of franco PC
Cabinet - June 2018	21	27.6	7	33.3	28.0	1	4.8	5.9	0	—	—
Cabinet - June 2019	28	38.4	9	32.1	37.5	2	7.1	11.8	0	—	—
Cabinet - June 2021	29	40.8	10	34.5	43.5	6	20.7	35.3	0	—	—

== Key events ==
=== New Progressive Conservative ministry ===
PC leader was invited to form a new ministry, and assembled a 21-member Cabinet which was sworn in by Lieutenant Governor Elizabeth Dowdeswell on June 29. The cabinet featured Ford as Premier and Minister of Intergovernmental Affairs, two of his recent leadership rivals, Christine Elliott as Deputy Premier and Minister of Health, and Caroline Mulroney as Attorney General, former interim party leaders Vic Fedeli and Jim Wilson as Minister of Finance and Minister of Economic Development respectively and a number of veteran caucus members such as Lisa MacLeod (as Minister of Community and Social Services and Minister of Children and Youth Services), Lisa Thompson (as Minister of Education), John Yakabuski (as Minister of Transportation) and Todd Smith (as Government House Leader). Ernie Hardeman, the only PC caucus member other than Wilson with previous cabinet experience, returned to helmed the agriculture ministry, a portfolio he held in the Harris ministry. The only caucus member with federal cabinet experience Greg Rickford was given both the northern development and the indigenous affairs portfolios.

Of the twenty-one members of Ford's inaugural cabinet, seven were women, making up a third of cabinet and larger group than all previous conservative ministry, was largely inline with women's representation in the PC caucus (32.9%), and lower than the 39.5% of women representation in the legislature. The seven women translated to 28.0% of the PC women MPPs, largely in line with 27.6% of caucus being in cabinet. Stunningly however, Ford tapped only one visible minority person, Raymond Cho, making up 4.8% of cabinet, despite 22.4% of the PC caucus being persons of colours. One minister also means only 5.7% of the visible minorities caucus members were in cabinet, drastically lower than the 27.6% overall. In addition, 26 other Progressive Conservative MPPs were appointed to be parliamentary assistants.

Two major cabinet shuffle took place during this parliament, on June 20, 2019, and June 18, 2021, with smaller adjustments made to its composition on November 5, 2018, December 31, 2020, October 19, 2021, and January 14, 2022. The most senior member of cabinet brought its first scandal. On November 2, 2018, Jim Wilson resigned from cabinet and caucus following allegations of unwelcome sexual advance by staff, and Todd Smith assumed his role as Minister of Economic Development.

The initially modestly-sized executive lasted for just shy of a year. On June 20, 2019, Ford vastly expanded his cabinet by a third at its first major shuffle. Three new members, Doug Downey, Stephen Lecce and Ross Romano were given senior cabinet roles, while four others, Paul Calandra,Jill Dunlop, Kinga Surma, and Prabmeet Sarkaria were made minister without portfolio. The most significant shuffle among existing minister was Rod Phillips assuming the role of Minister of Finance. The shuffle brought its headcount to 28.

Despite the vast expansion, only two more women (for a total of nine) and one person of colour joined cabinet. With nine women in a cabinet of twenty eight translated to a slight drop to 32.1% presence, still largely inline with women's representation in the PC caucus (32.9%), and lower than the 39.5% of women representation in the legislature. The proportion of women PC MPPs members in cabinet increased to 37.5%, largely kept up with the increase to 38.4% PC MPPs overall who were in cabinet. With two of the twenty right members being persons of colour, the proportion of minorities increased to 7.1%, still far from 23.3% that now make up of caucus. Two ministers brought the proportion of minorities caucus members in cabinet to 11.8%, which the over all proportion went up 38.4%

Philips's tenure at the Treasury was short however. He was forced to resigned following criticism of his international vacations during the COVID pandemic, and was replaced by Peter Bethlenfalvy in early 2021. a major shuffle in June 2021 saw the ousting of five veteran caucus members: Ernie Hardeman (first elected 1995), John Yakabuski, Laurie Scott, (both first elected in 2003) Jeff Yurek and Bill Walker (both first elected 2011); and the entrance of six new ministers. With the departure of Hardeman, the Ford ministry no longer had any incumbent minister who had served in previous PC ministries. The exit of these veterans left Lisa MacLeod and Christ Elliott as the most senior caucus members in cabinet. The shuffle brought the cabinet to twenty-nine members, just one member less than the peak of the Wynne ministry Ford criticized much about. (Note: The Wynne ministry consisted of 30 members from June to December 2016.)

While cabinet only grew by one overall, this shuffle made great stride in addressing the underrepresentation of women and visible minorities in cabinet. The number of women increased to ten (34.5%, surpassed 32.4% presence in PC caucus) and the number of racialized persons tripled to six (20.7%, only slightly lower than 23.9% presence in the PC caucus). It also meant that 43.5% of the PC members who were women, and 35.3% of the PC members who were visible minorities were in cabinet, compare to 40.8% of all PC caucus members being in cabinet.

=== First session ===
==== 2018-19 ====
The first session of the 42nd Parliament began on July 11, 2018, with the Speech from the Throne delivered by Lieutenant Governor Dowdeswell. In the summer session two bills were adopted. The first bill, adopted by the Parliament on July 26, was the Urgent Priorities Act (Bill 2) which enacted back-to-work legislation to end strike action at York University, canceled the White Pines wind project, and required Hydro One create new compensation packages for their chief executive officer and board of directors which would be subject to government approval. The second bill, titled Better Local Government Act, 2018 (Bill 5) removed the City of Toronto's powers to determine the composition of City Council and the division of the City into wards and replaced it with a requirement that the city's wards follow the provincial riding boundaries, as well as eliminate elected chair positions in the regions of Peel, York, Niagara and Muskoka, in favour of appointed positions — all applicable to the 2018 municipal elections.

In the fall 2018 sitting of the first session, seven more bills were adopted. Bill 4 repealed the province's emissions trading legislation, the Climate Change Mitigation and Low-Carbon Economy Act and Bill 34 repealed the Green Energy Act. Bill 32 amended the Ontario Energy Board Act to spread of the cost of expanding the natural gas distribution system to all rate-payers rather than those immediately benefiting from the expansion. Bill 47, Making Ontario Open for Business Act, retracted the planned 2019 increase to the minimum wage while tying future increases to a calculation of inflation, replaced a mandatory provision for all employees to be provided two paid sick days with unpaid leave days, eliminated mandatory pay-equity for part-time and casual workers, deleted the allowance of a trade union to obtain a list of employees and closed the Ontario College of Trades. Bill 57 was an omnibus bill that made numerous amendments to various acts, including closing the office of the Provincial Advocate for Children and Youth, and the office of the Environmental Commissioner, repeals the Ontario Place Corporation Act and the Trillium Trust Act, expanding the area Metrolinx provides service to while deleting the requirement that it consider all forms of transportation it is plans, exempting the Royal Canadian Legion from property taxes, allowing professional full-time fire-fighters to also work part-time at a different fire department, increasing the maximum allowable contributions that can be made to political parties while removing the prohibition of MLAs from attending fund-raising events, proclaiming March 27, 2019, to be Special Hockey Day, creating a Low-Income Individuals and Families tax credit, closing the offices of the Conflict of Interest Commissioner and the French Language Services Commissioner while moving their duties to the offices of the Integrity Commissioner and the Ombudsman, respectively. Also, Bill 36 created a licensing system for private cannabis retail stores and allowed cannabis consumption in all areas where the smoking of tobacco is allowed and Bill 67 disallowed strike action by the unionized workers of the Ontario Power Generation.

In the spring 2019 sitting, several more bills were adopted. The Restoring Ontario's Competitiveness Act (Bill 66) was another omnibus bill that amended numerous unrelated acts, as well as repealed the Pawnbrokers Act, the Toxics Reduction Act, 2009, and the Wireless Services Agreements Act, 2013. Bill 48 amended several education-related acts to make provisions for service animals in schools, require applicants for the Ontario College of Teachers to demonstrate proficiency in mathematics, and amend the provisions regarding teacher-student sexual abuse. Bill 68 repealed and replaced the Police Services Act and the Police Oversight Act with the Community Safety and Policing Act and the Special Investigations Unit Act. In addition to repealing the Lung Health Act, Bill 74 enacted the Connecting Care Act to create a new Crown agency titled Ontario Health intended to merge the 14 Local Health Integration Network and several crown agencies such as Cancer Care Ontario, the Gift of Life Network, eHealth Ontario, HealthForceOntario, and provide the ability for the government to create Integrated Care Delivery Systems (or Health Teams) to deliver health care services. Bill 115 terminated the province's agreement with The Beer Store in favour of making alcoholic beverages available for sale through grocery stores and convenience outlets. Bill 107 transferred, to Metrolinx from the City of Toronto, the responsibility for designing and developing rapid transit within the city. Bill 108 amended 13 acts, including the Endangered Species Act by inserting new abilities for the Ministry of the Environment to delay listing species on the endangered list and provide exemptions from the protections under the act for listed species, the Environmental Assessment Act by allowing for exemptions to routine class environmental assessments, the Ontario Heritage Act by creating a formal process for property owners to appeal a heritage designation, the Development Charges Act and Planning Act regarding what and how certain services may be charged development cost charges, community benefits charges and municipal parkland acquisitions, allow for inclusionary zoning and create lower timelines for local governments to decide on rezoning and subdivision applications, and the Local Planning Appeal Tribunal Act by amending the practices and procedures of the tribunal.

Few bills were adopted during the fall 2019 sitting but they amended, created or repealed numerous acts. Bill 136 repealed the Ontario Society for the Prevention of Cruelty to Animals Act and replaced it with the Provincial Animal Welfare Services Act. Bill 124 caps public sector wage increases to no more than 1% per year. Bill 138 repealed the Toronto Stock Exchange Act; enacted the Egyptian Heritage Month Act, the Hellenic Heritage Month Act, the Provincial Day of Action on Litter Act, and the Supply Chain Management (Government, Broader Public Sector and Health Sector Entities) Act; repealed and replaced the Liquor Licence Act and the Wine Content and Labelling Act with the new Liquor Licence and Control Act; amended cannabis-related acts to allow for online and telephone purchases from private cannabis retail stores and allowed peace officers and judges to refer a youth to an education program rather than pursuing conviction of a cannabis offense, and created a lower aviation fuel tax rate applicable to purchases made in Northern Ontario. Bill 132, aimed at red tape reduction eliminated or lowered certain penalties for contravening the Environmental Protection Act; repealed the Residential Complex Sales Representation Act, Local Planning Appeal Support Centre Act, Farm Products Grades and Sales Act, Partnerships for Jobs and Growth Act, Paperback and Periodical Distributors Act, Statute Labour Act, and the Freshwater Fish Marketing Act; permits Algoma University and Ontario College of Art & Design University to award degrees and diplomas in all branches of learning; and amended Pesticides Act to allow for more use of pesticides for cosmetic purposes, among other provisions.

==== 2020-21 ====
The legislature reconvened in 2020 but the events of the COVID pandemic came to dominant the agenda. Covid-related legislation adopted in 2020 included budgetary measures in Bill 188; Bill 186 to create an unpaid leave of absence within the Employment Standards Act for infectious disease emergencies and to repeal the SARS Assistance and Recovery Strategy Act; Bill 187 to allow local governments to hold meetings through electronic means; Bill 189 to suspend loan repayments in the Ontario Student Assistance Program; Bill 190 to allow provincially-regulated organizations to conduct business remotely (e.g. use of electronic signatures, filings, affidavits); Bills 192 & 204 to suspend evictions of commercial tenants and freeze residential rents; Bill 195 to allow the Ontario Provincial Police to enforce covid-related regulations on gatherings; Bill 218 indemnified workers and organizations from legal actions relating to covid exposures; and Bill 283 enacted the Covid-19 Vaccination Reporting Act.

Other bills adopted in 2020 included Bill 197 to amend the Environmental Assessment Act to prioritize assessments by anticipated impact, allow for a streamlined-class of assessment, and reduce mandated timelines of other assessments; amend the Planning Act addressing community benefits charges and enhancing order making powers for the minister responsible; amend the Education Act to allow for demonstration schools; create an appeal process for those denied farm business registration; amend the Payday Loans Act to cap fees for dishonoured cheques, pre-authorized debits, and loans under $1,500; create the new Transit-Oriented Communities Act; and repeal and replace the Burden Reduction Reporting Act, 2014 and the Reducing Regulatory Costs for Business Act, 2017 with the new Modernizing Ontario for People and Businesses Act, 2020. Bill 213, titled the Better for People, Smarter for Business Act, 2020 was adopted to repeal the Ontario Highway Transport Board Act, grant university status and rename several Christian colleges, remove residency requirements for corporate directors, and allow the Ministry of the Environment to levy new fees for providing documents. Bill 215 removes local government ability to regulate noise associated with the delivery of goods, and increases fines for unlicenced ridesharing. Bill 229 reduces the authority of conservation authorities and allows municipalities to opt out; removes promotion of renewable energy generation from the list of objectives of the Ontario Energy Board; exempts Army, Navy and Air Force Veterans in Canada from paying property tax; creates the "seniors' home safety tax credit"; creates iGaming as a subsidiary of the Ontario Lottery and Gaming Corporation; creates the Ontario Centres of Excellence Inc.; exempts forestry operations on crown land from complying with the Endangered Species Act; updates and modernizes the Credit Unions and Caisses Populaires Act; repeals and replaces the Film Classification Act with the new Film Content Information Act; and repeals the Financial Services Commission of Ontario Act. Bill 236 creates government regulations applicable to food delivery services.

Bills adopted in 2021 included Bill 245 which enacted the Ontario Land Tribunal Act to consolidate several different boards and tribunals into one body; Bill 251 which enacted the Anti-Human Trafficking Strategy Act and repealed and replaced the Hotel Registration of Guests Act with the Accommodation Sector Registration of Guests Act; Bill 283 which created the Health and Supportive Care Providers Oversight Authority; and Bill 282 which enacted the Towing and Storage Safety and Enforcement Act to regulate towing services. Bill 246 mandated that school buses be equipped with four overhead amber signal-lights and four overhead red signal-lights. Bills 254 and 307 brought social media accounts under the purview of the Members' Integrity Act and invoked the "notwithstanding clause" to double the amount of time spending limits are imposed on political advertising by third parties. Bill 269 created Invest Ontario and the Ontario jobs training tax credit while Bills 222 and 257 expedited certain transit and broadband projects that were deemed to be a priority. Bill 288 replaced the Ontario College of Trades with a new Crown corporation Skilled Trades Ontario. Bill 276 made the Northern Ontario School of Medicine and the Collège de Hearst into universities, dissolved the Health Professions Regulatory Advisory Council and the Ontario Drug Benefit Act's Pharmacy Council and a Citizens' Council, and created a prohibition on recordings hearings of the Landlord and Tenant Board.

=== Second session ===
Speech from the Throne was read on October 4, 2021.

=== Timeline of the 42nd Parliament of Ontario ===
The following notable events occurred during the 2018–present period:

Date	Event	Type
June 29, 2018	Ford ministry took office, effecting the first transition of power since 2003.	ministry
July 11, 2018	The 42nd Parliament of Ontario convened its first session. Ted Arnott (PC, Wellington—Halton Hills), one of the three co-deans (Note: distinction as Dean of the Legislative Assembly was held jointly by Ted Arnott, Gilles Bisson, and Jim Wilson) of the legislative assembly, was elected Speaker.	house
July 12, 2018	Lieutenant Governor Elizabeth Dowdeswell delivered the speech from the throne.	house
November 2, 2018:	Jim Wilson (PC, Simcoe—Grey), one of the three co-deans of the legislature and a veteran minister from Harris and Eves ministries, resigned from cabinet and the PC caucus after allegations of sexual misconduct.	ministry
November 29, 2018	Amanda Simard (PC, Glengarry–Prescott–Russell) left PC caucus protesting the government's cuts to French-language services.	PC caucus
February 20, 2019	Randy Hillier (PC, Lanark—Frontenac—Kingston) was suspended from the PC caucus for being disrespectful toward parents concerned about cuts to autism funding.	PC caucus
June 20, 2019	First significant cabinet shuffle of the Ford ministry, cabinet expand from twenty-one to twenty-eight members. New entrants included Education Minister Stephen Lecce and Attorney General Doug Downey.	ministry
July 31, 2019	Nathalie Des Rosiers (Liberal, Ottawa—Vanier), a minister in the Wynne ministry resigned from the legislature accept a position as Principal of Massey College at the University of Toronto.	Lib caucus; membership
September 20, 2019	Liberal Marie-France Lalonde (Orléans), a minister in the Wynne ministry resigned from the legislature after securing the federal Liberal nomination of her riding in the 2019 Canadian federal election.	Lib caucus; membership
January 16, 2020	Independent MPP Amanda Simard (Glengarry–Prescott–Russell) joins the Liberal caucus.	Lib caucus
February 27, 2020	By-elections were held to filled the vacancy in Orleans and Ottawa–Vanier, both seats retained by the Liberals. These would be the only by-elections held during this parliament.	Lib caucus; membership
March 7, 2020	Former Liberal minister Steven Del Duca, who was not a member of the 42nd Parliament emerged victorious at the 2020 Ontario Liberal leadership convention, defeating Michael Coteau (Don Valley East) and Mitzie Hunter (Scarborough—Guildwood), both sitting members of the 42nd Parliament, among others. John Fraser (Ottawa South) continued as parliamentary leader for the remainder of the term.	Lib caucus
March 14, 2020	The government announced closure of all public schools due to outbreak of COVID-19.	public
March 17, 2020	On the same day of the province's first reported death directly linked to COVID, Premier Ford declared a provincial state of emergency under the Emergency Management and Civil Protection Act and began to order the closure of certain businesses and facilities	public
July 21, 2020	Belinda Karahalios (PC, Cambridge) was removed from the PC caucus after voting against a government bill extending emergency powers for up to two years.	PC caucus
December 31, 2020	Finance minister Rod Phillips resigned following criticism of his international vacations during the COVID-19 pandemic and was replaced by Treasury Board President Peter Bethlenfalvy	ministry
January 15, 2021	Roman Baber (PC, York Centre) was removed from the PC caucus after releasing an open letter to end the province-wide lockdown, saying it was "deadlier than COVID".	PC caucus
January 18, 2021	Karahalios (Ind, Cambridge) formed the New Blue Party caucus in the Legislative Assembly.	PC caucus
June 18, 2021	Major cabinet shuffle, with seven members entering cabinet (including former Finance minister Rod Phillips) and five veteran members ousted.	ministry
August 17, 2021	Michael Coteau (Liberal, Don Valley East) resigned to seek election in the 44th Canadian general election	Lib caucus
August 19, 2021	Rick Nicholls (PC, Chatham-Kent-Leamington) ousted from the PC Caucus for failing to get vaccinated against COVID-19.	PC caucus
September 12, 2021	First session prorogued, with the second session scheduled to convene on October 4, 2021.	house
October 22, 2021	Lindsey Park (PC Durham) resigned from the PC Caucus after allegations that she misrepresented her vaccination status to the Premier's office.	PC caucus
March 17, 2022	Paul Miller (NDP, Hamilton East–Stoney Creek) was removed from the NDP caucus after it is found during vetting for re-election that he had joined an Islamophobic Facebook group.	NDP cacucus
April 22, 2022	Kevin Yarde (NDP, Brampton North) resigned from caucus after he losing the party's nomination.	NDP cacucus
May 3, 2022	Dissolution of the 42nd Parliament in advance of the 2022 general election	house

== Change in composition ==
=== Departures and by-elections ===
Five members resigned from the legislature before completing their terms. This remarkably low number is partially thanks to outbreak of COVID, which essentially halted all matters of life for a part portion of this parliament.

Nathalie Des Rosiers (Lib, Ottawa—Vanier), a late star recruit to the Wynne ministry, was the first to resign from this parliament in July 2019 to become Principal of Massey College at the University of Toronto, having served just shy of three years. She was soon followed by erstwhile Ottawa cabinet colleague Marie-France Lalonde (Lib, Orléans) who resigned upon securing the federal Liberal nomination for the federal election that fall. The Liberals successfully defended those seats in byelections held during in the final weeks of their leadership contest in late February 2020.

The runner-up at that leadership convention, former minister Michael Coteau (Lib, Don Valley East), was the next member to resign, but not until August 2021 after he had secured the federal nomination for his riding for the subsequent federal election. As the world was reopening for business in early 2022, two former PC ministers, former finance minister Rod Phillips (PC Ajax) and former transportation minister Jeff Yurek (PC, Elgin—Middlesex—London) both resigned in February, 2022. Given these three resigned less than 12 months before the next election, no byelection were called to fill the vacancies.

Aside from the five resignation, all other changes to the house were relating to caucus membership of existing members.

=== Caucus departures ===
Seven PC members and two NDP members left their caucus to sit as independents.

Veteran member Jim Wilson (PC, Simcoe—Grey) was the first to leave in November 2018, having resigned from cabinet due to allegations by his own staff of unwanted sexual advances.

Amanda Simard (PC, Glengarry—Prescott—Russell) left the PC caucus also in November 2018 to protest the government plan for elimination of the province's French-language services commissioner and the cancellation of plans for a French-language university. After sitting as an independent for a year, she joined the Ontario Liberal Party in early 2020.

Marverick Randy Hillier (Lanark—Frontenac—Kingston) was suspended in February 2019 after making what Premier Ford characterized as "disrespectful comments to parents of children with autism" and was expelled in March.

Four other PC members were ousted from caucus by party leadership for stance related to COVID-19. They were Belinda Karahalios (Cambridge), Roman Baber (York Centre), Rick Nicholls (Chatham-Kent-Leamington), Lindsey Park (Durham).

Two NDP members, Paul Miller (Hamilton East—Stoney Creek) a long time internal critic of party leader Andrea Horwath, and Kevin Yarde (Brampton North) left the NDP caucus on the eve of the 2022 election.

=== Representation gained by new parties ===
Two right wing parties gained their first member in the legislation by recruiting a members who were expelled from the PC caucus. Belinda Karahalios (Cambridge) was ejected from the PC caucus in July 2020 for voting against Bill 195, which would allow the provincial government to extend emergency powers for up to two years without consulting the legislature. Karahalios voted against the legislation, considering is an "unnecessary overreach on our parliamentary democracy." She formed a caucus of one in January 2021 for the not yet registered New Blue Party of Ontario founded by her husband.

Third term member Rick Nicholls (Chatham-Kent—Leamington) was ejected for refusing to take COVID vaccine. In December 2021, Nicholls joined the Ontario Party, a fringe party which field only five candidates in the previous election, to become its first sitting member.

=== Summary of seat changes ===
seat changed hand after by-election
involuntary departure
Progressive Conservative
New Blue Party
New Democratic
Ontario Party
Liberal
Independent

42rd Ontario Parliament (2018–22) - Membership and party affiliation changes
Electoral District	Before			Change	
Electoral District	Date	Reason	Member exited	New member	Date
Simcoe—Grey	Nov 2, 2018	Removal from caucus/cabinet (Note: following allegations by staff of unwelcomed sexual advances)	Jim Wilson		
Glengarry—Prescott—Russell	Nov 29, 2018	Resignation from caucus (Note: to protest planned cuts to francophone services.); Subsequently: Joined Liberal caucus	Amanda Simard		January 16, 2020
Lanark—Frontenac—Kingston	Feb 20, 2019	Removed from caucus (Note: for making allegedly disrespectful comments to parents of children with autism.)	Randy Hillier		
Ottawa—Vanier	July 31, 2019	Resignation (Note: to accept position as principal of Massey College of the University of Toronto.)	Nathalie Des Rosiers	Lucille Collard	February 27, 2020
Orléans	Sep 20, 2019	Resignation: to contest fedearl seat Subsequently: elected MP	Marie-France Lalonde	Stephen Blais	February 27, 2020
York Centre	January 15, 2021	Removed from caucus (Note: for opposing COVID lockdown)	Roman Baber		
Cambridge	July 21, 2020	Removed from caucus (Note: for voting against Bill 195) Subsequently: Co-found New Blue Party	Belinda Karahalios		January 18, 2021
Don Valley East	August 17, 2021	Resignation: to contest fedearl seat Subsequently: elected MP	Michael Coteau	Vacant at dissolution	
Durham	October 22, 2021	Resigned from caucus (Note: following accusations of misrepresentation on COVID-19 vaccine status)	Lindsey Park		
Chatham—Kent—Leamington	August 19, 2021	Removed from caucus (Note: for refusal of COVID-19 vaccination) Subsequently: Joined Ontario Party	Rick Nicholls		December 22, 2021
Ajax	February 2, 2022	Resignation (Note: to return to the private sector.)	Rod Phillips	Vacant at dissolution	
Elgin—Middlesex–London	February 28, 2022	Resignation (Note: to retire from politics)	Jeff Yurek	Vacant at dissolution	
Hamilton East—Stoney Creek	March 17, 2022	Removed from caucus (Note: for allegedly having joined an Islamophobic Facebook group)	Paul Miller		
Brampton North	April 22, 2022	Resignation from caucus (Note: following nomination contest defeat)	Kevin Yarde		

=== Membership changes ===
Party	2018			2019			2020			2021						2022			
Party	Jun. 7	Nov. 2	Nov. 29	Feb. 20	Jul. 31	Sep. 20	Jan. 16	Feb. 27	Jul. 21	Jan. 15	Jan. 18	Aug. 17	Aug. 19	Oct. 22	Dec. 22	Feb. 2	Feb. 28	Mar. 17	Apr. 22
Progressive Conservative	76	75	74	73					72	71			70	69		68	67		
New Democratic	40																	39	38
Liberal	7				6	5	6	8				7							
Green	1																		
New Blue	(not registered until 2021)									–	1								
Ontario Party	(a fringe party with only 5 candidates in 2018)														1				
Independent	–	1	2	3			2		3	4	3		4	5	4			5	6
Total members	124				123	122		124				123				122	121		
Vacant	–				1	2		–				1				2	3		
Government Majority	28	26	24	22	23	24		22	20	18		19	17	15		14	13		

=== Seating plan ===
Hassan	Farrell	Harden	Rakocevic	Morrison	Glover	Bell	Bourgouin	Arthur	Berns-McGown	Burch		Collard	Yarde	Karahalios	Park
Kernaghan	West	Stevens	Gates	Gretzky	French		G. Singh	Andrew	Hatfield	Karpoche		Blais	Simard	Hillier	Baber
	Stiles	Armstrong	Mantha	Taylor		Begum	Mamakwa	Shaw	Mae Lindo	Natyshak		Hunter	Gravelle	Miller	Nicholls
			Gélinas	Fife	S. Singh	Vanthof	Sattler	Horwath	Bisson	Tabuns		Fraser	Wynne	Schreiner	Wilson
Arnott
			Gill	Lecce	Mulroney	Calandra	Fedeli	Ford	Elliott	Bethlenfalvy	Sarkaria	Clark	T. Smith	Jones	Downey	MacLeod	Rickford
Parsa	Khanjin	Coe	McNaughton	Dunlop	Rasheed	Piccini	Surma	McKenna	S. Cho	Fullerton	Thompson	Tibollo	Romano	Tangri	R. Cho	Hardeman
Walker	McDonell	Hogarth	Yakabuski	Crawford	Bailey	Sandhu	Pettapiece	Skelly	Martin	Barrett	Roberts	Scott	Harris	Miller	Cuzzetto	Bouma
Kramp	Pang	Fee	Triantafilopoulos	Oosterhoff	Sabawy	Thanigasalam	Ke	D. Smith	Ghamari	Wai	Babikian	Kusendova	Anand	Kanapathi	Martow	Mitas

Note: Bold text designates the party leader, John Fraser serves as the Parliamentary leader of the Ontario Liberal Party as their leader does not have a seat in the Legislature.

== Members ==
=== Key figures in the 42nd Ontario Parliament ===
Government		Opposition	
	Elizabeth II; Queen of Canada		
Elizabeth Dowdeswell; Lieutenant Governor
	Ted Arnott, Wellington—Halton Hills; Speaker		
	Bill Walker, Bruce—Grey—Owen Sound (from 2021); Rick Nicholls, Chatham-Kent—Leamington (to 2021); Deputy Speaker and Chair of the Committee	Lisa Gretzky, Windsor West (1st); Percy Hatfield, Windsor—Tecumseh (2nd); Jennifer French, Oshawa (3rd); Deputy Chairs of the Committee of the Whole	
Premier; PC Leader	Doug Ford, Etobicoke North	Andrea Horwath, Hamilton Centre	Leader of the Opposition; NDP Leader
Deputy Premier	Christine Elliott, Newmarket—Aurora	John Vanthof, Timiskaming—Cochrane; Sara Singh, Brampton Centre	Co-Deputy Leaders; NDP
Government; House Leader	Paul Calandra, Markham—Stouffville; Todd Smith (to 2019), Bay of Quinte	Gilles Bisson, Timmins	Opposition; House Leader
Government; Chief Whip	Lorne Coe, Whitby	John Vanthof, Timiskaming—Cochrane; Teresa Armstrong (2019–21), London—Fanshawe; France Gelinas (2018–19), Nickel Belt	Opposition Chief Whip; NDP Chief Whip
		John Fraser, Ottawa South	Liberal Parliamentary Leader
		Kathleen Wynne, Don Valley West	Liberal House Leader
		Mitzie Hunter, Scarborough—Guildwood	Liberal Whip
		Mike Schreiner, Guelph	Green Party Leader

=== Notable facts ===
==== Family business ====
Remarkably, this parliament consisted of three members, all of the PC caucus, who were children of former first ministers:

- Norm Miller (PC, Parry Sound—Muskoka), son of Premier Frank Miller (Premier 1985, MPP for Muskoka 1971–87)
- Mike Harris Jr. (PC, Kitchener—Conestoga), son of Premier Mike Harris (Premier 1995–2002, MPP for Nipissing 1981–2002, minister in the Miller ministry)
- Caroline Mulroney (PC, York—Simcoe), daughter of Prime Minister Brian Mulroney (Prime Minister 1984–93)

Other members with parliamentarian parents included:

- Jill Dunlop (PC, Simcoe North), daughter of Garfield Dunlop (MPP for Simcoe North 1999–2015)
- Doug Ford (PC, Etobicoke—North), son of Doug Ford Sr. (MPP for Etobicoke—Humber 1995–99)
- John Yakabuski (PC, Renfrew—Nipissing—Pembroke). son of Paul Yakabuski (MPP for Renfrew South 1963–87)
- Laurie Scott (PC, Haliburton—Kawartha Lakes—Brock), daughter of William C. Scott (MP for Victoria 1965–93)

While no opposition members was known to have parents who were former members, at least one opposition members had family relation, and actually to a current member. Other members with family relations with members or former members included:

- Christine Elliott (PC, Newmarket—Aurora) previously succeeded her late husband Jim Flaherty (MPP 1995–2006, MP 2006–14, minister of Harris and Eves minister, and federal Finance minister in Harper ministry 2006–13) when he resigned to run federally.
- John Vanthof (NDP, Timiskaming—Cochrane) is a nephew of Ernie Hardeman (PC, Oxford)
- Gurratan Singh (NDP, Brampton East) is a brother of Jagmeet Singh (MPP for Bramalea—Gore—Malton 2011–17, MP & federal NDP leader 2019–25)
- Toby Barrett (PC, Haldimand—Norfolk) grandson of Theobald Butler Barrett (MP for Norfolk 1945–49)

==== In both good times and bad ====
The previous dean of the legislature, long-time Liberal minister Jim Bradley, was first elected in 1977. Upon his defeat in the 2018 election, the distinction went to three joint-deans who were first elected to the legislature in the 1990 election: Jim Wilson (PC, Simcoe—Grey), Ted Arnott (PC, Wellington—Halton Hills) and Gilles Bisson (NDP, Timmins), all having served long enough to have seen government of all three strips, and each have spent more time on the opposition bench than on the government bench.

Not surprisingly given their recent tenure in government, six of the seven Liberal members went into opposition with cabinet experience. Two members of the PC caucus, Jim Wilson (PC, Simcoe—Grey) and Ernie Hardeman (PC, Oxford) has previously served in cabinet when the PC were last in power, while the Ontario cabinet, while Greg Rickford (PC, Kenora—Rainy River) has recently served in the federal Harper ministry. No member of the NDP have served in cabinet, though Bisson had served as a parliamentary assistant.

==== Grace and dedication in defeat ====
Despite having led her party to a devastating defeat, former Premier Kathleen Wynne served out the full four-year term and maintained an active presence in the legislature and served as her party's house leader. In honouring the mandate given by voters of her home riding, she followed a time-honoured tradition of all three former Liberal Premiers who have retained their seats after leading the party to defeat. George Ross, the first Ontario Liberal Premier to go into opposition, led the party for two more sessions before accepting a Senate appointment and a knighthood. With their internal disagreements undoubtedly contributed to their government's defeat, Mitch Hepburn and Harry Nixon reconciled with Nixon willingly relinquished the party leadership back to Hepburn. Hepburn served until he was voted out by voters back home in the subsequent election, and Nixon served four more terms until his death midway through the fifth. (Note: The most recent predecessor who have led the party to defeat, David Peterson, was defeated in his own London Centre riding, and thus was not included.) The tradition was not limited to Liberal premiers, however. Of the three Conservative premiers who retained their seat while leading their party to defeat, Frank Miller served a full term, and George Henry served two. (Note: Other premiers who led their party to defeat: PC Ernie Eve resigned 15 months after; NDP Bob Rae 8 months after; Liberal David Peterson, United Farmers Ernest Drury, and Conservative William Hearst were defeated locally; John Sandfield Macdonald died within six months of being ousted.)

=== List of members ===
Member of Ford ministry (cabinet minister):
§ throughout the 42nd Parliament
⸹ part of the 42nd Parliament
Progressive Conservative
New Democratic
Liberal
⁂ Party leader
Green
New Blue
Ontario Party

Name	Party	Riding	First elected/previously elected	No. of terms	Notes
Rod Phillips	Progressive Conservative	Ajax	2018	1st term	Resigned February 2, 2022
Michael Mantha	New Democrat	Algoma—Manitoulin	2011	3rd term	
Michael Parsa	Progressive Conservative	Aurora—Oak Ridges—Richmond Hill	2018	1st term	
Andrea Khanjin	Progressive Conservative	Barrie—Innisfil	2018	1st term	
Doug Downey §	Progressive Conservative	Barrie—Springwater—Oro-Medonte	2018	1st term	
Todd Smith §	Progressive Conservative	Bay of Quinte	2011	3rd term	
Rima Berns-McGown	New Democrat	Beaches—East York	2018	1st term	
Sara Singh	New Democrat	Brampton Centre	2018	1st term	
Gurratan Singh	New Democrat	Brampton East	2018	1st term	
Kevin Yarde	New Democrat	Brampton North	2018	1st term	Left NDP caucus on April 22, 2022 following nomination defeat
Kevin Yarde	Independent	Brampton North	2018	1st term	Left NDP caucus on April 22, 2022 following nomination defeat
Prabmeet Sarkaria §	Progressive Conservative	Brampton South	2018	1st term	
Amarjot Sandhu	Progressive Conservative	Brampton West	2018	1st term	
Will Bouma	Progressive Conservative	Brantford—Brant	2018	1st term	
Bill Walker §	Progressive Conservative	Bruce—Grey—Owen Sound	2011	3rd term	
Jane McKenna §	Progressive Conservative	Burlington	2011, 2018	2nd term*	
Belinda Karahalios	Progressive Conservative	Cambridge	2018	1st term	Removed from PC caucus July 21, 2020; formed New Blue caucus January 18, 2021
Belinda Karahalios	Independent	Cambridge	2018	1st term	Removed from PC caucus July 21, 2020; formed New Blue caucus January 18, 2021
Belinda Karahalios	New Blue	Cambridge	2018	1st term	Removed from PC caucus July 21, 2020; formed New Blue caucus January 18, 2021
Goldie Ghamari	Progressive Conservative	Carleton	2018	1st term	
Rick Nicholls	Progressive Conservative	Chatham-Kent—Leamington	2011	3rd term	Removed from PC caucus August 19, 2021; joined the Ontario Party and formed its caucus December 22, 2021
Rick Nicholls	Independent	Chatham-Kent—Leamington	2011	3rd term	Removed from PC caucus August 19, 2021; joined the Ontario Party and formed its caucus December 22, 2021
Rick Nicholls	Ontario Party	Chatham-Kent—Leamington	2011	3rd term	Removed from PC caucus August 19, 2021; joined the Ontario Party and formed its caucus December 22, 2021
Marit Stiles	New Democrat	Davenport	2018	1st term	
Michael Coteau	Liberal	Don Valley East	2011	3rd term	Resigned August 17, 2021 to contest federal seat; Previously served as a minister in the Wynne ministry (2013–18)
Vincent Ke	Progressive Conservative	Don Valley North	2018	1st term	
Kathleen Wynne	Liberal	Don Valley West	2003	5th term	Former Premier (2013–18) & minister in the McGuinty ministry (2006–12); longest serving woman in the 42nd Parliament
Sylvia Jones	Progressive Conservative	Dufferin—Caledon	2007	4th term	
Lindsey Park	Progressive Conservative	Durham	2018	1st term	Resigned from PC caucus October 22, 2021.
Lindsey Park	Independent	Durham	2018	1st term	Resigned from PC caucus October 22, 2021.
Robin Martin	Progressive Conservative	Eglinton—Lawrence	2018	1st term	
Jeff Yurek	Progressive Conservative	Elgin—Middlesex—London	2011	3rd term	Resigned February 28, 2022
Taras Natyshak	New Democrat	Essex	2011	3rd term	
Kinga Surma §	Progressive Conservative	Etobicoke Centre	2018	1st term	
Christine Hogarth	Progressive Conservative	Etobicoke—Lakeshore	2018	1st term	
Doug Ford § ⁂	Progressive Conservative	Etobicoke North	2018	1st term	Premier
Donna Skelly	Progressive Conservative	Flamborough—Glanbrook	2018	1st term	
Amanda Simard	Progressive Conservative	Glengarry—Prescott—Russell	2018	1st term	Resigned from PC caucus November 29, 2018; joined Liberal caucus January 16, 2020
Amanda Simard	Independent	Glengarry—Prescott—Russell	2018	1st term	Resigned from PC caucus November 29, 2018; joined Liberal caucus January 16, 2020
Amanda Simard	Liberal	Glengarry—Prescott—Russell	2018	1st term	Resigned from PC caucus November 29, 2018; joined Liberal caucus January 16, 2020
Mike Schreiner ⁂	Green	Guelph	2018	1st term	
Toby Barrett	Progressive Conservative	Haldimand—Norfolk	1995	7th term	
Laurie Scott §	Progressive Conservative	Haliburton—Kawartha Lakes—Brock	2003, 2011	5th term*	
Andrea Horwath ⁂	New Democrat	Hamilton Centre	2004	5th term	Leader of the Opposition
Paul Miller	New Democrat	Hamilton East—Stoney Creek	2007	4th term	NDP until March 17, 2022
Paul Miller	Independent	Hamilton East—Stoney Creek	2007	4th term	NDP until March 17, 2022
Monique Taylor	New Democrat	Hamilton Mountain	2011	3rd term	
Sandy Shaw	New Democrat	Hamilton West—Ancaster—Dundas	2018	1st term	
Daryl Kramp	Progressive Conservative	Hastings—Lennox and Addington	2018	1st term	Previously served as an MP (2004–15)
Tom Rakocevic	New Democrat	Humber River—Black Creek	2018	1st term	
Lisa Thompson §	Progressive Conservative	Huron—Bruce	2011	3rd term	
Merrilee Fullerton §	Progressive Conservative	Kanata—Carleton	2018	1st term	
Greg Rickford §	Progressive Conservative	Kenora—Rainy River	2018	1st term	Previously served as an MP (2008–15) and federal minister (Harper ministry 2013–15)
Sol Mamakwa	New Democrat	Kiiwetinoong	2018	1st term	
Stephen Lecce §	Progressive Conservative	King—Vaughan	2018	1st term	
Ian Arthur	New Democrat	Kingston and the Islands	2018	1st term	
Laura Mae Lindo	New Democrat	Kitchener Centre	2018	1st term	
Mike Harris Jr.	Progressive Conservative	Kitchener—Conestoga	2018	1st term	Son of former Premier Mike Harris (1995–2002)
Amy Fee	Progressive Conservative	Kitchener South—Hespeler	2018	1st term	
Monte McNaughton §	Progressive Conservative	Lambton—Kent—Middlesex	2011	3rd term	
Randy Hillier	Progressive Conservative	Lanark—Frontenac—Kingston	2007	4th term	Suspended from PC caucus February 20, 2019; expelled March 15, 2019
Randy Hillier	Independent	Lanark—Frontenac—Kingston	2007	4th term	Suspended from PC caucus February 20, 2019; expelled March 15, 2019
Steve Clark §	Progressive Conservative	Leeds—Grenville—Thousand Islands and Rideau Lakes	2010	4th term	
Teresa Armstrong	New Democrat	London—Fanshawe	2011	3rd term	
Terence Kernaghan	New Democrat	London North Centre	2018	1st term	
Peggy Sattler	New Democrat	London West	2013	3rd term	
Paul Calandra §	Progressive Conservative	Markham—Stouffville	2018	1st term	Previously served as an MP (2008–15)
Logan Kanapathi	Progressive Conservative	Markham—Thornhill	2018	1st term	
Billy Pang	Progressive Conservative	Markham—Unionville	2018	1st term	
Parm Gill §	Progressive Conservative	Milton	2018	1st term	Previously served as an MP (2011–15)
Natalia Kusendova	Progressive Conservative	Mississauga Centre	2018	1st term	
Kaleed Rasheed §	Progressive Conservative	Mississauga East—Cooksville	2018	1st term	
Sheref Sabawy	Progressive Conservative	Mississauga—Erin Mills	2018	1st term	
Rudy Cuzzetto	Progressive Conservative	Mississauga—Lakeshore	2018	1st term	
Deepak Anand	Progressive Conservative	Mississauga—Malton	2018	1st term	
Nina Tangri §	Progressive Conservative	Mississauga—Streetsville	2018	1st term	
Guy Bourgouin	New Democrat	Mushkegowuk—James Bay	2018	1st term	
Lisa MacLeod §	Progressive Conservative	Nepean	2006	5th term	
Christine Elliott §	Progressive Conservative	Newmarket—Aurora	2006, (Note: Whitby—Ajax/Whitby—Oshawa) 2018	5th term*	
Jeff Burch	New Democrat	Niagara Centre	2018	1st term	
Wayne Gates	New Democrat	Niagara Falls	2014	3rd term	
Sam Oosterhoff	Progressive Conservative	Niagara West	2016	2nd term	First elected at age 19, youngest person ever elected to the Ontario legislature, and youngest member of the 42nd parliament
France Gélinas	New Democrat	Nickel Belt	2007	4th term	
Vic Fedeli §	Progressive Conservative	Nipissing	2011	3rd term	Former leader of the opposition (January–June 2018)
David Piccini §	Progressive Conservative	Northumberland—Peterborough South	2018	1st term	
Stephen Crawford	Progressive Conservative	Oakville	2018	1st term	
Effie Triantafilopoulos	Progressive Conservative	Oakville North—Burlington	2018	1st term	
Marie-France Lalonde	Liberal	Orléans	2014	2nd term	Resigned September 20, 2019; former minister (Wynne ministry)
Stephen Blais	Liberal	Orléans	2020	1st term	Byelection on February 27, 2020
Jennifer French	New Democrat	Oshawa	2014	2nd term	
Joel Harden	New Democrat	Ottawa Centre	2018	1st term	
John Fraser ⁂	Liberal	Ottawa South	2013	3rd term	Parliamentary leader (Note: in place of party leader Steven Del Duca who was not an elected member during this parliament)
Nathalie Des Rosiers	Liberal	Ottawa—Vanier	2016	2nd term	Resigned July 31, 2019; former minister (Wynne ministry)
Lucille Collard	Liberal	Ottawa—Vanier	2020	1st term	Byelection on February 27, 2020
Jeremy Roberts	Progressive Conservative	Ottawa West—Nepean	2018	1st term	
Ernie Hardeman §	Progressive Conservative	Oxford	1995	7th term	Previously served as a minister in the Harris & Eves ministries (1999–2001, 2003)
Bhutila Karpoche	New Democrat	Parkdale—High Park	2018	1st term	
Norm Miller	Progressive Conservative	Parry Sound—Muskoka	2001	6th term	Son of former Premier Frank Miller (1985)
Randy Pettapiece	Progressive Conservative	Perth—Wellington	2011	3rd term	
Dave Smith	Progressive Conservative	Peterborough—Kawartha	2018	1st term	
Peter Bethlenfalvy §	Progressive Conservative	Pickering—Uxbridge	2018	1st term	
John Yakabuski	Progressive Conservative	Renfrew—Nipissing—Pembroke	2003	5th term	Son of former MPP Paul Yakabuski (1963–1987)
Daisy Wai	Progressive Conservative	Richmond Hill	2018	1st term	
Jennie Stevens	New Democrat	St. Catharines	2018	1st term	
Bob Bailey	Progressive Conservative	Sarnia—Lambton	2007	4th term	
Ross Romano §	Progressive Conservative	Sault Ste. Marie	2017	2nd term	
Aris Babikian	Progressive Conservative	Scarborough—Agincourt	2018	1st term	
Christina Mitas	Progressive Conservative	Scarborough Centre	2018	1st term	
Mitzie Hunter	Liberal	Scarborough—Guildwood	2013	3rd term	former minister (Wynne ministry)
Raymond Cho §	Progressive Conservative	Scarborough North	2016	2nd term	
Vijay Thanigasalam	Progressive Conservative	Scarborough—Rouge Park	2018	1st term	
Doly Begum	New Democrat	Scarborough Southwest	2018	1st term	
Jim Wilson	Progressive Conservative	Simcoe—Grey	1990	8th term	Joint-dean of the assembly (Note: distinction as Dean of the Legislative Assembly was held jointly by Ted Arnott, Gilles Bisson, and Jim Wilson)served as a minister in the Harris & Eves ministries (1995–96, 1997–2003); Resigned from cabinet and caucus on November 2, 2018 following sexual harassment complaint by aide
Jim Wilson	Independent	Simcoe—Grey	1990	8th term	Joint-dean of the assembly served as a minister in the Harris & Eves ministries (1995–96, 1997–2003); Resigned from cabinet and caucus on November 2, 2018 following sexual harassment complaint by aide
Jill Dunlop §	Progressive Conservative	Simcoe North	2018	1st term	Daughter of former MPP Garfield Dunlop (1999–2015)
Chris Glover	New Democrat	Spadina—Fort York	2018	1st term	
Jim McDonell	Progressive Conservative	Stormont—Dundas—South Glengarry	2011	3rd term	
Jamie West	New Democrat	Sudbury	2018	1st term	
Gila Martow	Progressive Conservative	Thornhill	2014	3rd term	
Judith Monteith-Farrell	New Democrat	Thunder Bay—Atikokan	2018	1st term	
Michael Gravelle	Liberal	Thunder Bay—Superior North	1995	7th term	Longest serving Liberal member; previously served as a minister in the McGuinty & Wynne ministries (2007–18)
John Vanthof	New Democrat	Timiskaming—Cochrane	2011	3rd term	Nephew of Oxford MPP Ernie Hardeman
Gilles Bisson	New Democrat	Timmins	1990	8th term	Joint-dean of the assembly
Suze Morrison	New Democrat	Toronto Centre	2018	1st term	
Peter Tabuns	New Democrat	Toronto—Danforth	2006	5th term	
Jill Andrew	New Democrat	Toronto—St. Paul's	2018	1st term	
Jessica Bell	New Democrat	University—Rosedale	2018	1st term	
Michael Tibollo §	Progressive Conservative	Vaughan—Woodbridge	2018	1st term	
Catherine Fife	New Democrat	Waterloo	2012	3rd term	
Ted Arnott	Progressive Conservative	Wellington—Halton Hills	1990	8th term	Speaker;Joint-dean of the assembly
Lorne Coe	Progressive Conservative	Whitby	2016	2nd term	
Stan Cho §	Progressive Conservative	Willowdale	2018	1st term	
Percy Hatfield	New Democrat	Windsor—Tecumseh	2013	3rd term	
Lisa Gretzky	New Democrat	Windsor West	2014	2nd term	
Roman Baber	Progressive Conservative	York Centre	2018	1st term	Removed from PC caucus January 15, 2021.
Roman Baber	Independent	York Centre	2018	1st term	Removed from PC caucus January 15, 2021.
Caroline Mulroney §	Progressive Conservative	York—Simcoe	2018	1st term	Daughter of former Prime Minister Brian Mulroney
Faisal Hassan	New Democrat	York South—Weston	2018	1st term	
