= Wellington—Halton Hills =

Wellington—Halton Hills could refer to:

- Wellington—Halton Hills (federal electoral district)
- Wellington—Halton Hills (provincial electoral district)
