= Regulatory college =

Body responsible for governing a certain profession

Regulatory colleges are legal entities in Canada charged with serving the public interest by regulating the practice of a profession. They are state-sanctioned to regulate the practice of their professions within Canada.

Most regulatory colleges are established by an act of parliament instead of through articles of association or incorporation, and usually do not require registration in order to acquire juridical personality. The legislation that creates a regulatory college is usually provincial rather than federal, since the Canadian constitution makes the regulation of most professional activity a provincial rather than federal area of responsibility. They are legislated as requirements to work in a given field. For example, no worker in Ontario may work in a skilled trade classified as a "compulsory trade" without membership in the Ontario College of Trades.

The specific individual regulatory colleges are granted specific powers and responsibilities by provincial acts of parliament. They are charged with protecting the public by investigating incidents of misconduct by members (also referred to as registrants or licensees), and expelling or charging members who engage in misconduct.

Misconduct may involve willful malicious acts, but may also include not working to the standard of competence set by the college, or not following an established code of ethics, or infringing upon one of the bylaws maintained by the college.

In addition to investigating misconduct, regulatory colleges have a duty to maintain a public register of members.
