= Joseph Racinsky =

Canadian politician

Joseph Racinsky MPP
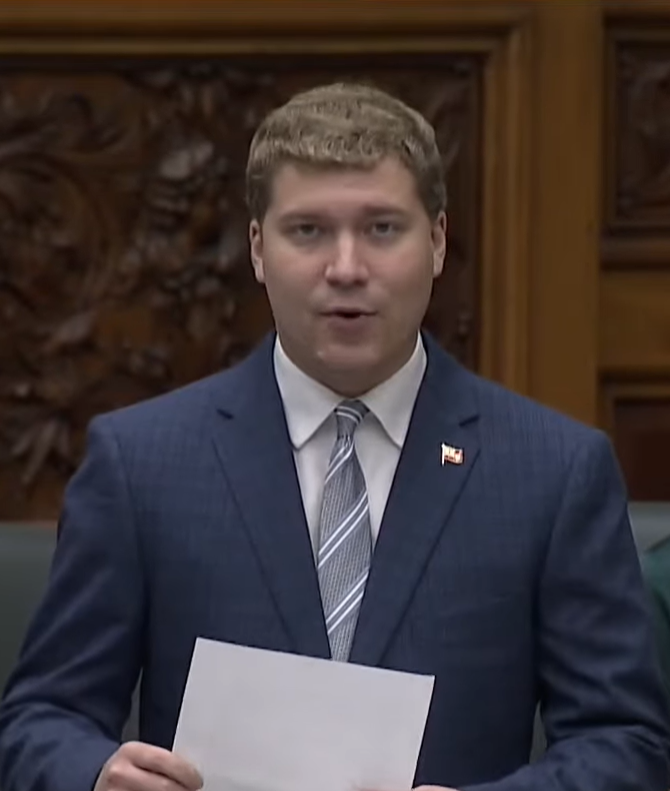
- Racinsky in 2025

Member of the Ontario Provincial Parliament for Wellington—Halton Hills
- Incumbent
- Assumed office February 27, 2025
- Preceded by: Ted Arnott

Personal details
- Born: 2001 (age 24–25) Georgetown, Ontario, Canada
- Party: Progressive Conservative

Joseph Racinsky MPP is a Canadian politician who was elected to the Legislative Assembly of Ontario in 2025, representing the riding of Wellington—Halton Hills. He is a member of the Progressive Conservative Party of Ontario.

Prior to being elected to the legislature, Racinsky served as a town councillor in Halton Hills, and was the youngest councillor ever elected to the Halton Hills council. Elected to the legislature at twenty-three years of age, Racinsky succeeded associate energy minister Sam Oosterhoff as the baby of the house in the 44th Parliament.

== Electoral Record ==
2025 Ontario general election
** Preliminary results — Not yet official **
Party	Candidate	Votes	%	±%	Expenditures
Progressive Conservative	Joseph Racinsky	24,429	45.3	–5.3	
Liberal	Alex Hilson	14,874	27.6	+13.6	
Green	Bronwynne Wilton	8,462	15.7	+1.5	
New Democratic	Simone Kent	4,154	7.7	–7.9	
New Blue	Stephen Kitras	1,452	2.7	–2.5	
Ontario Party	Jason Medland	399	0.7	N/A	
Independent	Ron Patava	199	0.4	–0.1	
Total valid votes/expense limit					
Total rejected, unmarked, and declined ballots					
Turnout			51.0	+2.6	
Eligible voters		105,810			
Progressive Conservative hold		Swing		–9.5	
Source: Elections Ontario
