= Reza Moridi =

Canadian politician

The Honourable Reza Moridi ECO

Ontario MPP
- In office 2007–2018
- Preceded by: New riding
- Succeeded by: Daisy Wai
- Constituency: Richmond Hill

Personal details
- Born: 1945 (age 80–81) Urmia, West Azarbaijan, Iran
- Party: Liberal
- Profession: Physicist, Engineer

Reza Moridi (Persian: رضا مریدی; born c. 1945) is a former politician in Ontario, Canada. He was a Liberal member of the Legislative Assembly of Ontario from 2007 to 2018 who represented the riding of Richmond Hill. He served as a cabinet minister in the government of Kathleen Wynne. He was the first Iranian-Canadian elected to legislature and appointed as a Cabinet minister in Canada.

== Background ==
Moridi was born in Urmia, capital of West Azerbaijan Province in northwest Iran. He grew up in Urmia, attended Alborz High School in Tehran and graduated from Tehran University with BSc and MSc degrees in Physics. He continued his education in the UK and obtained MTech and PhD degrees from Brunel University in London. He received an Honorary Doctorate from Odlar Yurdu University, Baku, Azerbaijan.

For his contributions to physics and engineering, Moridi was elected Fellow of the Institute of Physics and Fellow of the Institution of Engineering and Technology of the UK. In recognition of his contributions to the understanding of nuclear materials and radiation, the Canadian Nuclear Society presented him with the Education and Communication Award. Also, in recognition of his contributions to the profession of Health Physics, the Health Physics Society of the United States presented him with the Fellow Award. Moridi has received numerous awards and recognitions for his extensive community and humanitarian work.

Prior to entering into politics, he was a Chartered Engineer and Chartered Physicist. He worked for 17 years at the Radiation Safety Institute of Canada where he was the Vice-President and Chief Scientist. He also worked in the electrical industry as an executive and in academia as a professor and administrator.

== Politics ==
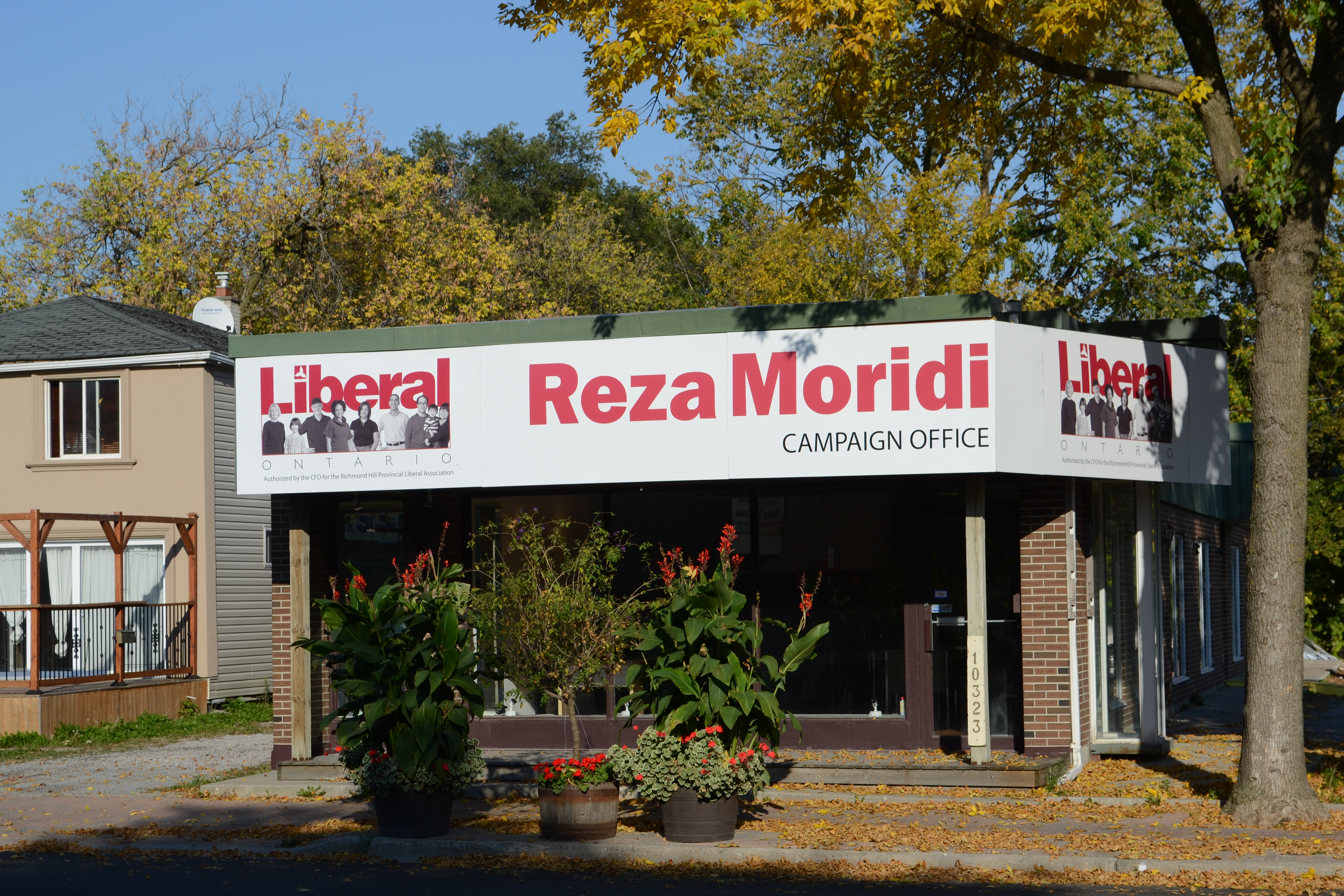
Moridi's campaign office

Moridi ran as the Liberal candidate in the 2007 provincial election in the riding of Richmond Hill. He defeated Progressive Conservative Alex Yuan by 5,329 votes. He was re-elected in 2011, and 2014. Moridi was defeated in the 2018 Provincial Election by Conservative Member of Provincial Parliament Daisy Wai. He intended to contest his former seat as a Member of Provincial Parliament for Richmond Hill in four years in 2018. Last year in 2020, Moridi formally announced that he will not going to run in the next election.

During the Dalton McGuinty government he served as Parliamentary Assistant to the Ministers of Training, Colleges and Universities, Research and Innovation and Energy. When Kathleen Wynne took over as Premier in 2013, she appointed Moridi to her cabinet as Ministry of Research and Innovation. After the 2014 election she assigned him the additional role of Ministry of Training, Colleges and Universities. On June 13, 2016, Moridi's cabinet role was reduced to a renamed portfolio of Minister of Research, Innovation and Science. He also served as Chair of the Cabinet Committee on Education, Skills and Economy.

=== Contributions during Public Service ===
In 2015, Moridi launched modernization of the Ontario Students Assistance Program (OSAP) by making tuition free for students from low and middle income families and helped establish York University campus in Markham, e-Campus in Toronto and initiated the process of modernizing the university funding formula and the first ever stand-alone French language university in Ontario.

He signed MOUs with countries such as China, Germany, Czech Republic, UK, Korea, Israel, Denmark, Turkey and Jordan. He led Science and Technology missions to USA (four times), China (twice), Korea, Germany (twice), Czech Republic, Israel (twice), West Bank (twice), Jordan, Turkey, Armenia and Azerbaijan and led Nuclear Energy delegations to China and Korea.

=== Voluntary Community Service since departure from politics ===
Since he left politics, Moridi has been serving on the following volunteer positions:

- Senior Fellow, Massey College, University of Toronto
- Chair of Dean's Special Advisory Board, York University Faculty of Science
- Chair, Board of Directors, Radiation Safety Institute of Canada
- Chair, Honorary Advisory Board, Canada Innovative SMEs Association
- Chair, Board of Honorary Mentors, Outstanding Teenagers Leadership Foundation
- Trustee, Royal Canadian Institute for Science
- Trustee, Canadian Society of Iranian Engineers, and Architects
- Honorary Governor, Mon Sheong Foundation
- Advisory Board, Yara Leadership Society

=== Cabinet positions ===
Wynne ministry, Province of Ontario (2013–2018)
Cabinet posts (2)
Predecessor	Office	Successor
Brad Duguid	Minister of Training, Colleges and Universities; 2014–2016	Deb Matthews (Note: As Minister of Advanced Education and Skills Development)
Glen Murray	Minister of Research and Innovation and Science (Note: From 2013 to 2016 portfolio was known as Minister of Research and Innovation); 2013–2018	none

=== Awards and recognition ===
On October 12, 2018, the Iranian community of the Greater Toronto Area organized a tribute dinner honouring Reza Moridi where in recognition of his service to the Town of Richmond Hill, the Town named one of the streets “Urmia Avenue” - after the ancient city of Urmia in Iran where Moridi was born.

== Human rights ==
Moridi has been active in support of human rights in his homeland Iran. In 2009, he presented a petition to the legislature regarding the violation of human rights in Iran in the aftermath of the 2009 presidential election. He advocated for the passing of the legislation in the House of Commons of Canada on June 5, 2013, that proclaimed massacre of political prisoner in Iran by the order of Ayatollah Khomeini during the summer of 1988, was a crime against humanity. He also introduced a petition that asked the Federal Minister of Foreign Affairs to intervene on Saeed Malekpour's behalf and appeal to the government of Iran to free him.

In May 2010, he read a statement in praise of the Republic of Azerbaijan in honour of the nation's anniversary in which he called the current government of Azerbaijan "a secular democratic republic".

=== Electoral record ===
2018 Ontario general election: Richmond Hill
Party	Candidate	Votes	%	±%
Progressive Conservative	Daisy Wai	22,224	51.24	+14.70
Liberal	Reza Moridi	12,108	27.92	-19.86
New Democratic	Marco Coletta	7,490	17.27	+6.30
Green	Walter Bauer	1,248	2.88	-0.26
Libertarian	Igor Bily	301	0.69	-0.50
Total valid votes		43,371	100.0	
Total rejected, unmarked and declined ballots		444	1.02	
Turnout		52.87%		
Eligible voters		83,967		
Progressive Conservative gain		Swing		
Source: Elections Ontario
