= Richmond Hill (provincial electoral district) =

Provincial electoral district in Ontario, Canada

Coordinates: 43.87°N 79.42°W

Ontario electoral district
- Richmond Hill in relation to other Greater Toronto ridings

Provincial electoral district
- Legislature: Legislative Assembly of Ontario
MPP
Daisy Wai
Progressive Conservative
- District created: 2003
- First contested: 2007
- Last contested: 2025

Demographics
- Population (2016): 110,180
- Electors (2018): 83,967
- Area (km²): 40
- Pop. density (per km²): 2,754.5
- Census division: York
- Census subdivision: Richmond Hill

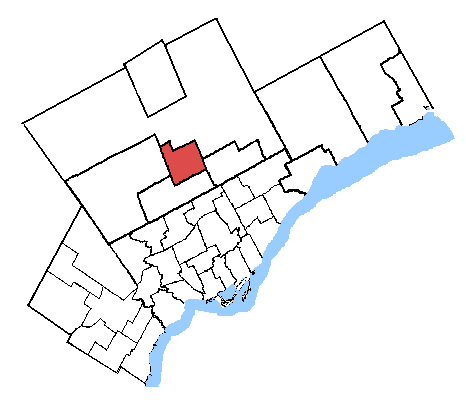
Richmond Hill 2003 to 2018

Richmond Hill is a provincial electoral district in Ontario, Canada, that has been represented in the Legislative Assembly of Ontario since the 2007 provincial election. It was created in 2003 from parts of Oak Ridges riding.

== Geography ==
The riding includes the neighbourhoods of Elgin Mills, Bayview North, Bayview South, North Richvale, Hillsview, Bayview Hill, South Richvale, Langstaff and Doncrest in the city of Richmond Hill.

It consists of the part of the city of Richmond Hill lying south and west of a line drawn from west to east along Gamble Road, south along Yonge Street, and east along Elgin Mills Road East.

== Members of Provincial Parliament ==
Richmond Hill
Assembly	Years	Member	Party
Riding created from Oak Ridges
39th	2007–2011	Reza Moridi	Liberal
40th	2011–2014	Reza Moridi	Liberal
41st	2014–2018	Reza Moridi	Liberal
42nd	2018–2022	Daisy Wai	Progressive Conservative
43rd	2022–2025	Daisy Wai	Progressive Conservative
44th	2025–present	Daisy Wai	Progressive Conservative

== Election results ==
2025 Ontario general election
Party	Candidate	Votes	%	±%
Progressive Conservative	Daisy Wai	17,061	55.43	+3.19
Liberal	Roozbeh Farhadi	10,546	34.26	+2.36
New Democratic	Raymond Bhushan	1,771	5.75	–3.35
Green	Alison Lam	883	2.87	–0.11
New Blue	Allison Bruns	519	1.69	–0.05
Total valid votes		30,780	99.18	
Total rejected, unmarked and declined ballots		253	0.82	+0.10
Turnout		31,033	35.56	–0.58
Eligible voters		87,268		
Progressive Conservative hold		Swing		+0.41
Source: Elections Ontario

2022 Ontario general election
Party	Candidate	Votes	%	±%
Progressive Conservative	Daisy Wai	16,088	52.24	+1.00
Liberal	Roozbeh Farhadi	9,825	31.90	+3.99
New Democratic	Raymond Bhushan	2,805	9.11	–8.16
Green	Hasen Nicanfar	917	2.98	+0.10
New Blue	Les Hoffman	535	1.74	–
Ontario Party	Ramtin Biouckzadeh	519	1.69	–
Moderate	Olga Rykova	107	0.35	–
Total valid votes		30,796	99.28	
Total rejected, unmarked and declined ballots		222	0.72	–0.30
Turnout		31,018	36.14	–16.04
Eligible voters		85,825		
Progressive Conservative hold		Swing		–1.49
Source: Elections Ontario

2018 Ontario general election
Party	Candidate	Votes	%	±%
Progressive Conservative	Daisy Wai	22,224	51.24	+14.70
Liberal	Reza Moridi	12,108	27.92	–19.87
New Democratic	Marco Coletta	7,490	17.27	+6.30
Green	Walter Bauer	1,248	2.88	–0.26
Libertarian	Igor Bily	301	0.69	–0.50
Total valid votes		43,371	98.99	
Total rejected, unmarked and declined ballots		444	1.01	–0.33
Turnout		43,815	52.18	+6.49
Eligible voters		83,967		
Progressive Conservative gain from Liberal		Swing		+17.28
Source: Elections Ontario

2014 Ontario general election
Party	Candidate	Votes	%	±%
Liberal	Reza Moridi	20,455	47.78	+0.86
Progressive Conservative	Vic Gupta	15,642	36.54	+0.75
New Democratic	Adam DeVita	4,697	10.97	–2.00
Green	Rachael Lave	1,344	3.14	–0.16
Libertarian	Igor Bily	510	1.19	+0.17
Moderate	Yuri Duboisky	160	0.37	–
Total valid votes		42,808	98.65	
Total rejected, unmarked and declined ballots		585	1.35	+0.79
Turnout		43,393	45.69	+3.20
Eligible voters		94,977		
Liberal hold		Swing		+0.06
Source: Elections Ontario

2011 Ontario general election
Party	Candidate	Votes	%	±%
Liberal	Reza Moridi	18,042	46.92	–0.91
Progressive Conservative	Vic Gupta	13,763	35.79	+1.06
New Democratic	Adam DeVita	4,987	12.97	+4.20
Green	Brian Chamberlain	1,268	3.30	–4.59
Libertarian	Tamas Demjen	394	1.02	–
Total valid votes		38,454	99.44	
Total rejected, unmarked and declined ballots		216	0.56	–0.25
Turnout		38,670	42.49	–4.74
Eligible voters		91,010		
Liberal hold		Swing		–0.99
Source: Elections Ontario

2007 Ontario general election
Party	Candidate	Votes	%
Liberal	Reza Moridi	19,456	47.83
Progressive Conservative	Alex Yuan	14,127	34.73
New Democratic	Nella Cotrupi	3,565	8.76
Green	Liz Couture	3,210	7.89
Family Coalition	Lisa Kidd	318	0.78
Total valid votes		40,676	99.19
Total rejected, unmarked and declined ballots		333	0.81
Turnout		41,009	47.23
Eligible voters		86,834	
Liberal pickup new district.			
Source: Elections Ontario

== 2007 electoral reform referendum ==
2007 Ontario electoral reform referendum
Side	Votes	%
First Past the Post	23,187	58.8
Mixed member proportional	16,219	41.2
Total valid votes	39,406	100.0

== See also ==
- List of Ontario provincial electoral districts
- Canadian provincial electoral districts
