= Restoring Ontario's Competitiveness Act, 2018 =

Ontario, Canada statute

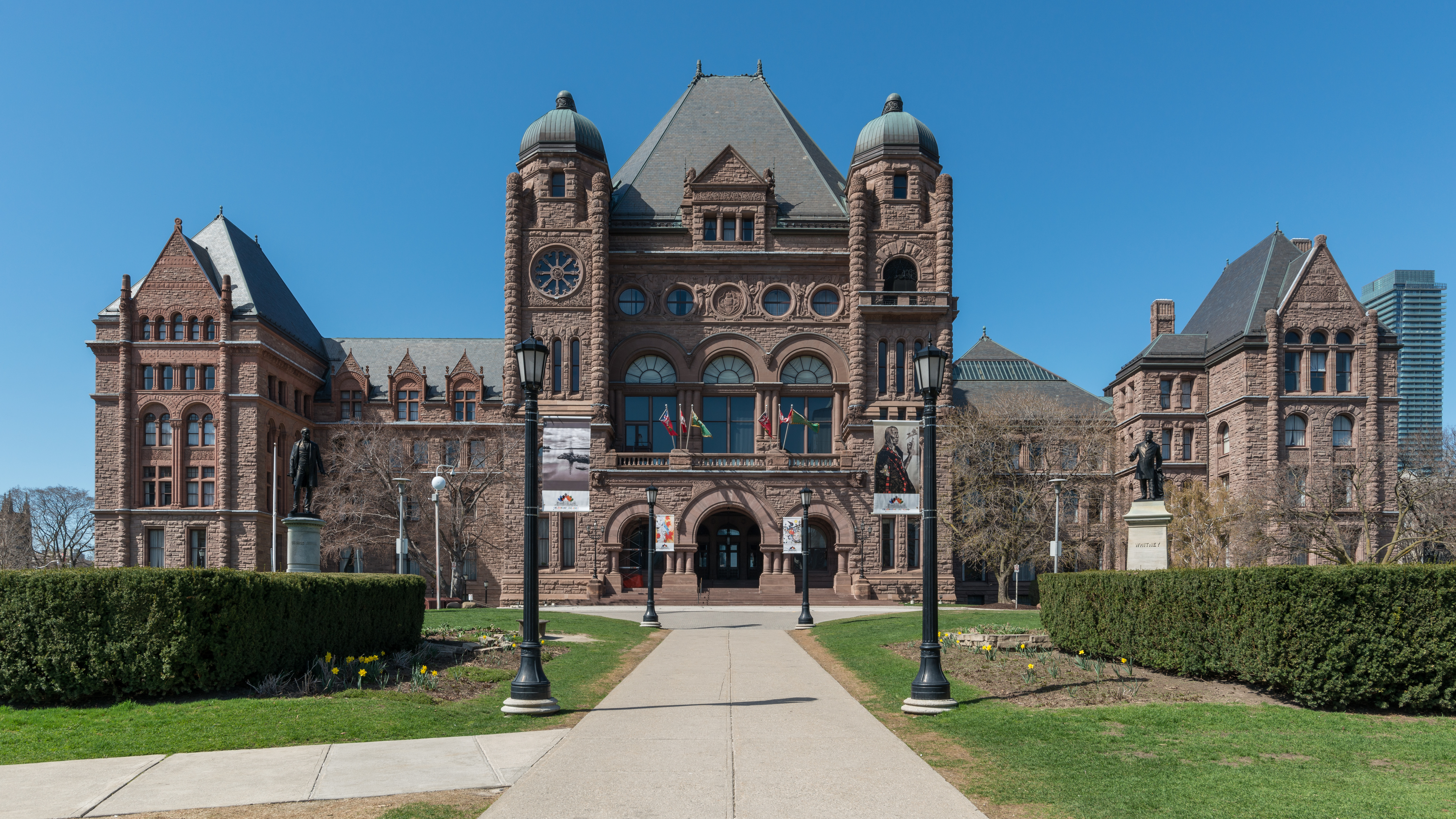

Legislative Assembly of Ontario
- Long title: An Act to restore Ontario's competitiveness by amending or repealing certain Acts
- Citation: S.O. 2019, c. 4
- Royal assent: April 3, 2019

Legislative history
- Bill citation: Bill 66
- Introduced by: Todd Smith, Minister of Government and Consumer Services
- First reading: December 6, 2018
- Second reading: March 6, 2019
- Third reading: April 2, 2019
- Status: Current legislation

The Restoring Ontario's Competitiveness Act, 2018 (the Act) is a law adopted on April 3, 2019, during the 42nd Parliament of Ontario. Critics of the bill argue that, if passed, it will repeal a number of consumer protections, labour laws, anti-crime rules, clean water rules, child safety rules, and environmental protections in the Province of Ontario. On the other hand, one study showed that there were significant public savings to be had through adoption of the bill: The City of Waterloo saw a 14% drop in the average amount of the winning bid for public construction projects while the city of Toronto, in 2019, could have saved up to $381 million.

The bill was introduced by Doug Ford's Conservative government on December 6, 2018. It is currently under consideration by the Legislative Assembly of Ontario, having passed first reading on December 6. Though the Ford government claims the bill will "reduce red tape", it has been criticized by numerous groups, including environmental, labour, and child safety advocates.

== Contents of bill ==
Bill 66 is an omnibus bill which seeks to amend many previous pieces of Ontario legislation. Critics of the bill argue that it will permit suburban development on the protected and environmentally-sensitive Ontario Greenbelt, repeal clean water rules implemented after the Walkerton E. coli outbreak, and "compromise the health and safety of Ontarians."

=== Schedule 1: affecting agricultural loans and horticulture employees ===
Schedule 1 amends the Agricultural Employees Protection Act, 2002, the Farm Registration and Farm Organizations Funding Act, 1993, and the Ministry of Agriculture, Food and Rural Affairs Act. In this schedule, changes are made to the rules affecting employers in the ornamental horticulture industry, rules regarding farm registration, and rules regarding agricultural loan guarantees. Specifically, ornamental horticulture employees will now be exempt from the scope of the Labour Relations Act, 1995, allowing the industry to operate under a different set of employment rules.

=== Schedule 2: repealing rules for pawnbrokers ===
Schedule 2 repeals the Pawnbrokers Act and amends the Personal Property Security Act. Critics argue that these rule changes will eliminate reporting requirements for secondhand goods dealers which were enacted to curb the sales of stolen property.

=== Schedule 3: affecting child care providers ===
Schedule 3 amends the Child Care and Early Years Act, 2014 and the Education Act and its regulations. The amendments will change the rules regarding in-home daycares, increasing the number of infants under the supervision of a single adult from two to three. According to Todd Smith, Ontario's Minister of Economic Development, the government's position is that increasing the number of young children allowed per adult caretaker in daycares will give parents more options and reduce the costs of daycare. However, critics argue that the changes will put children at risk. The current rules were set in 2014 after a series of daycare deaths in Ontario.

=== Schedule 4: affecting unit sub-metering in multi-unit rental buildings ===
Schedule 4 amends the Ontario Energy Board Act, 1998 and its regulations. The amendments will remove electricity pricing regulations for providers of unit sub-metering in multi-unit rental buildings.

=== Schedule 5: repealing the Toxics Reduction Act ===
Schedule 5 repeals the Toxics Reduction Act, 2009 and all regulations, in its entirety and without replacement, to be implemented December 31, 2021. According to the government, this will revert Ontario to the federal Chemicals Management Plan, removing "unnecessary duplication."

=== Schedule 6: removing oversight for pension plan mergers ===
Schedule 6 amends the Pension Benefits Act. According to the government, these changes will eliminate oversight protections when private-sector businesses choose to merge their pension plans into jointly sponsored pension plans.

=== Schedule 7: eliminating provincial requirements for cell phone plans and pressure vessels ===
Schedule 7 amends the Technical Standards and Safety Act, 2000 and repeals the Wireless Services Agreements Act, 2013 and all regulations, without replacement. The amendments to the Technical Standards and Safety Act reduce oversight for pressure vessel plants and eliminate Ontario's requirement for labeling upholstered and stuffed articles, such as mattresses and children's toys, with tags that specify the use of new or recycled materials. Additionally, the Schedule repeals the requirements for wireless service providers to write contracts in plain language, and removes the cap on cancellation fees, which, according to the Ontario government, is duplicated in the CRTC Wireless Code.

=== Schedule 8: removing public consultation requirements for long-term care homes ===
Schedule 8 amends the Long-Term Care Homes Act, 2007. This schedule repeals some oversight requirements long-term care homes. Specifically, long-term care homes will now be permitted to deny residency applications without reporting denials to the Ministry of Health and Long-Term Care. Additionally, public consultations will no longer be required prior to the issuing of long-term care home licenses.

=== Schedule 9: removing worker overtime hour and overtime pay requirements ===
Schedule 9 amends the Employment Standards Act, 2000 and the Labour Relations Act, 1995. Changes in this Schedule eliminate the approval requirement to allow employers to expect employees to work more than 48 hours per week, and will also allow employers to average hours worked over four weeks to calculate overtime pay.

Additionally, changes are made to the definition of "non-construction employers", allowing certain employers the power to hire non-union construction workers. Critics argue that these changes "effectively cancel any existing bargaining agreements that are in place."

=== Schedule 10: removing environmental protections in sensitive areas ===
Schedule 10 amends the Planning Act, allowing for the creation of so-called "Open for Business" planning by-laws.

==== "Open for Business" planning by-laws ====
According to the government, the amendments to the Planning Act will "cut red tape" and "shorten the time it takes to build projects that create jobs." However, these provisions have been criticized by environmental protection groups, farmers, and politicians from across the political spectrum.

The provisions will allow developers to bypass the protections in the Clean Water Act, and other acts which protect the Great Lakes, Lake Simcoe, the Ontario Greenbelt, and the Oak Ridges Moraine. It also bypasses the requirements in the Places to Grow Act which prohibits green-field development except in specific areas designated for future growth. During the election, Doug Ford had promised to protect the Greenbelt "in its entirety." Dr. Anne Bell, the Director of Conservation and Education at Ontario Nature, claims that the legislation "overrides crucial protections for clean water, farmland, wetlands, woodlands, and habitat for endangered species, in numerous provincial laws and policies."

=== Schedule 11: regarding private career colleges ===
Schedule 11 amends the Private Career Colleges Act, 2005. The government claims these amendments will "create registration requirements that make sense, align tuition fee collection with the federal government and reduce unnecessary regulatory notices."

=== Schedule 12: regarding cab cards in commercial trucks ===
Schedule 12 amends the Highway Traffic Act. According to the government, the amendments change the rules regarding cab cards in commercial trucks.

== Other changes ==
In addition to the text in Bill 66, the Government of Ontario's backgrounder listed several other intended effects in the legislation. These include relaxing food safety standards across the agricultural sector (including changes to the Milk Act, the Food Safety and Quality Act, the Nutrient Management Act, and the Livestock Medicines Act), modifying regulations regarding industrial safety guardrails, expanding the autonomous vehicle pilot program, permitting electric motorcycles on major highways, change rules for loans from credit unions, and removing some industrial wastewater regulations. However, none of these changes are within the current text of the bill.
