= Ted Arnott =

Canadian politician

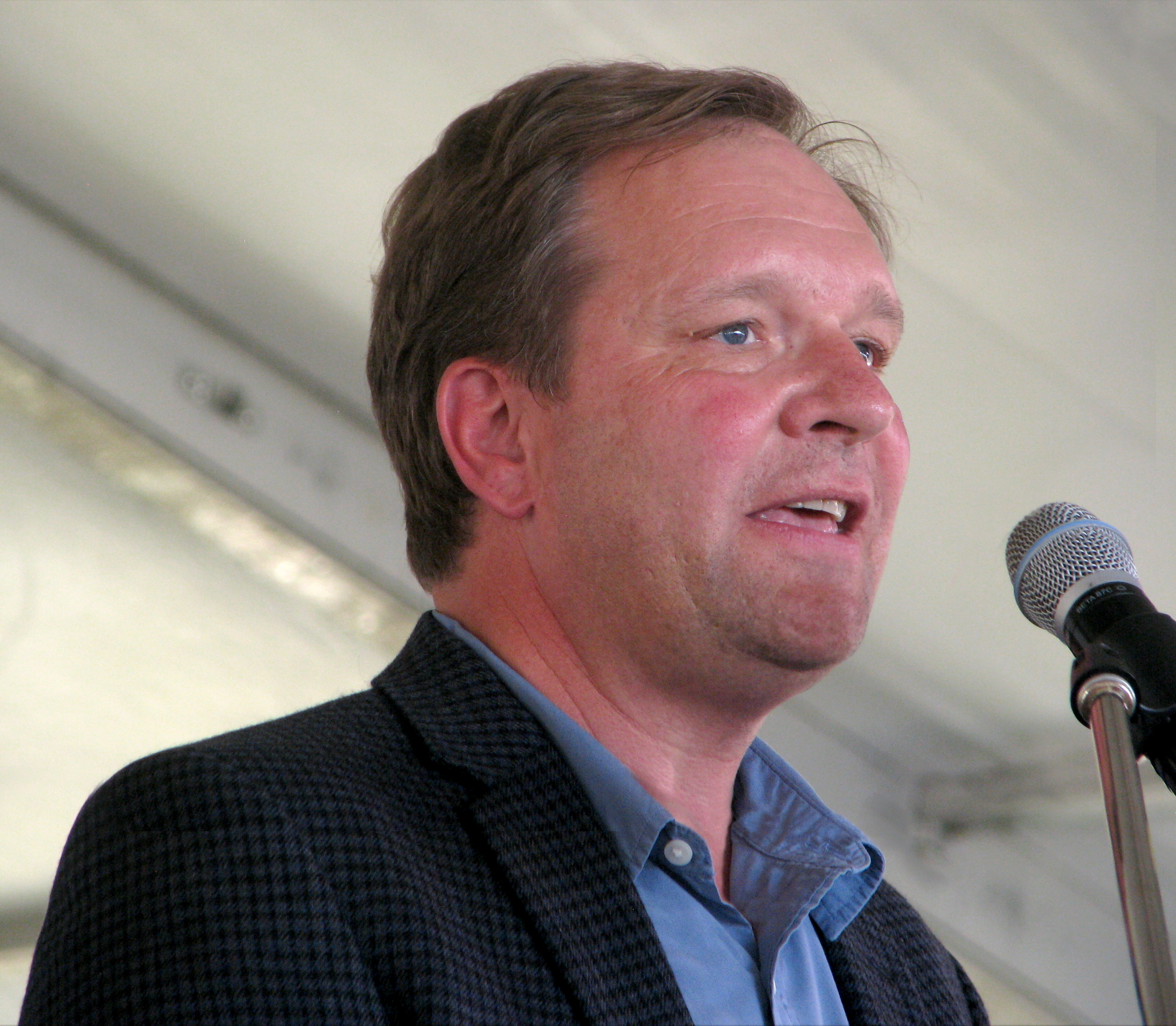
- Arnott in 2016

42nd Speaker of the Legislative Assembly of Ontario
- In office July 11, 2018 – April 14, 2025
- Preceded by: Dave Levac
- Succeeded by: Donna Skelly

Dean of the Legislative Assembly of Ontario
- In office June 7, 2018 – January 28, 2025 Serving with Gilles Bisson and Jim Wilson (2018 – 2022)
- Preceded by: Jim Bradley
- Succeeded by: Ernie Hardeman

Member of the Ontario Provincial Parliament for Wellington—Halton Hills Waterloo—Wellington (1999-2007) Wellington (1990-1999)
- In office September 6, 1990 – January 28, 2025
- Preceded by: Jack Johnson
- Succeeded by: Joseph Racinsky

Personal details
- Born: Theodore Calvin Arnott; April 8, 1963 (age 63) Fergus, Ontario, Canada
- Party: Progressive Conservative
- Occupation: Politician

Theodore Calvin Arnott (born April 8, 1963) is a Canadian politician who was first elected to the Legislative Assembly of Ontario on September 6, 1990, representing the Riding of Wellington. He is a member of the Progressive Conservative Party of Ontario and represented the Riding of Wellington—Halton Hills in the Ontario Legislature. Arnott served as Speaker of the Legislative Assembly of Ontario during the 42nd and 43rd Parliaments of Ontario.

In 2022, Arnott became the longest-serving member of the Ontario Legislature following the retirement of Jim Wilson and the defeat of Gilles Bisson. He is only member of the legislature who has continuously served since the 1990 Ontario general election and the premiership of Bob Rae. He retired in 2025.

== Background ==
Ted Arnott was born in 1963 in Fergus, Ontario. He grew up in Arthur, Ontario, where his family was in the engineering construction business. While attending school, he had a newspaper delivery route at the age of 9, and later worked part time as a retail store clerk, a construction labourer, and a factory worker. He also played minor hockey, lacrosse, and later tennis.

In 1979, he received recognition from the Order of St. John of Jerusalem for rendering "assistance which was instrumental in saving the life of a drowning man" at the Rockwood Conservation Area on August 20, 1978, receiving the honour from the Commissioner of the Ontario Provincial Police, Harold H. Graham.

After graduating from Arthur District High School, he attended Wilfrid Laurier University in Waterloo, earning a Bachelor of Arts degree, with a major in political science, and later receiving a Diploma in Business Administration. From 1987 to 1990, he was Executive Assistant to Jack Johnson, MPP for the Riding of Wellington and Chair of the Ontario Progressive Conservative Caucus.

Married in 1990, he and his wife Lisa live in Fergus, Ontario, and are the parents of three sons.

== Politics ==
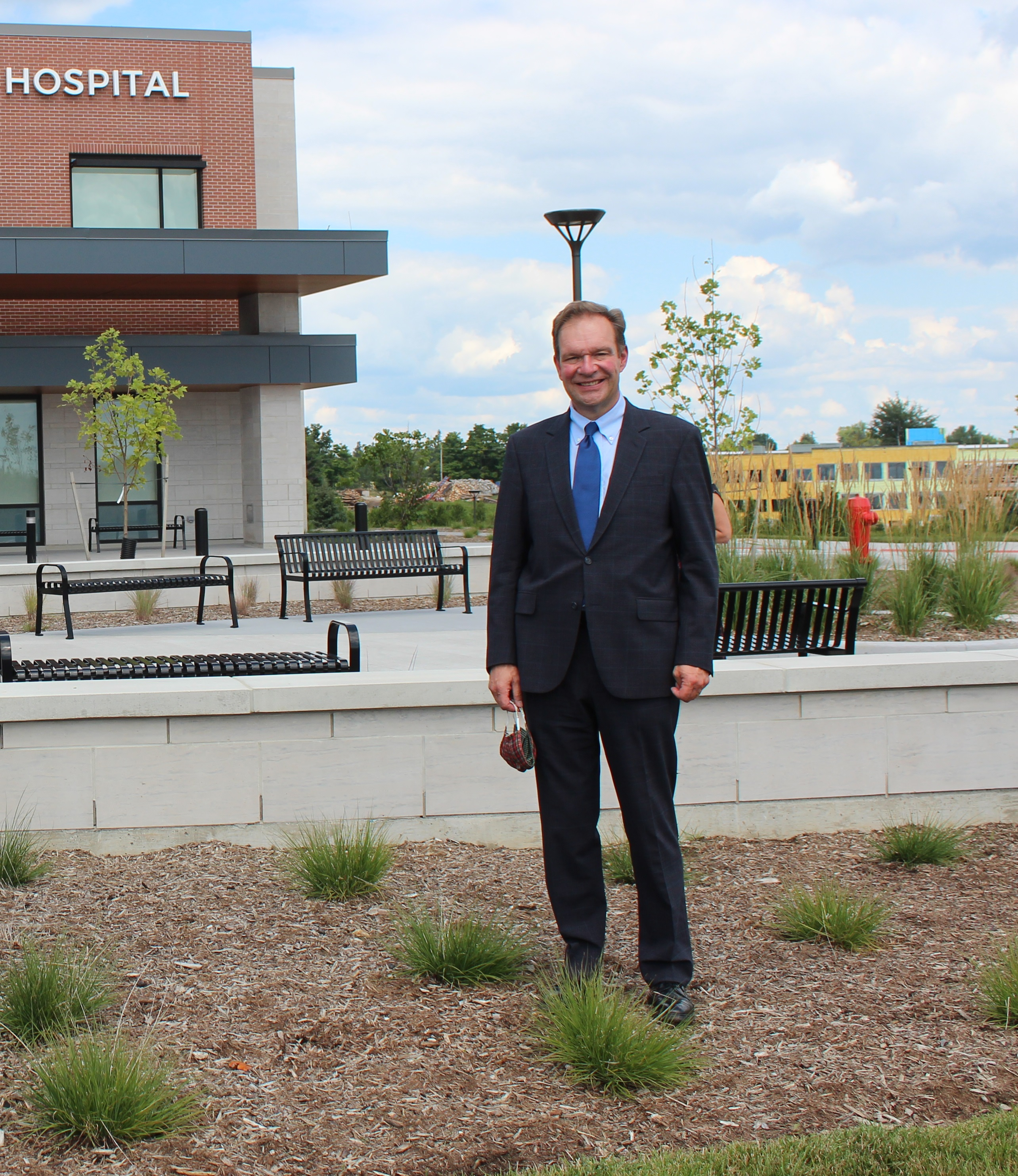
Arnott at Groves Memorial Community Hospital grand opening, August 2020

=== 1990s ===
Arnott first ran in the 1990 provincial election as the Progressive Conservative (PC) candidate in the Riding of Wellington at the age of 27; he was elected by a margin of 1,304 votes. At the time of his election, Arnott was the youngest MPP in the Ontario Progressive Conservative Caucus. Between 1990 and 1995, he served as PC Critic to the Minister of Transportation, and later as Critic to the Minister of Culture, Tourism, and Recreation, and as vice-chair of the Standing Committee on Estimates.

In the 1995 provincial election, Arnott was re-elected in Wellington, receiving 67% of the votes cast, as part of a majority Progressive Conservative Government led by Mike Harris.

While supporting the overall objectives of the Common Sense Revolution, the party's electoral platform, during the campaign he refused to sign the Taxpayers' Protection Pledge being circulated by the Ontario Taxpayers' Federation. Despite pressure from his party, he explained at the time that he was not willing to make promises that he could not be certain of keeping. He was the only member of the PC caucus not to sign the pledge.

During the 1995–1999 term of office, he served as Chair of the Standing Committee on the Legislative Assembly, and later as Parliamentary Assistant to the Minister of Economic Development and Trade, with responsibilities for supporting small business.

Re-elected in the provincial election of 1999 in the newly created Riding of Waterloo—Wellington, he served as Parliamentary Assistant to the Minister of Economic Development and later to the Minister of the Environment and then the Deputy Premier and Minister of Education. When Ernie Eves was elected Premier in 2002, Arnott asked not to be considered for a Cabinet position, saying the absences from home required of a Cabinet Minister would not allow him to spend sufficient time with his young family.

=== 2000s ===
In the 2003 provincial election as Dalton McGuinty's Liberals were given a majority, Arnott was re-elected in Waterloo-Wellington by a margin of 5,206 votes. This was despite a poll published by the Kitchener-Waterloo Record the week before the election predicting his defeat and claiming he was 18 percentage points behind his Liberal challenger.

Returning again to the role of Opposition, Arnott was appointed by the Legislature as First Deputy Chair of the Committee of the Whole House, a Presiding Officer role assisting the Speaker of the House.

In the 2007 provincial election, despite the re-election of a majority Liberal Government, Arnott was re-elected to the Legislature in the new Riding of Wellington—Halton Hills, becoming a GTA MPP for the first time. He was again appointed First Deputy Chair of the Committee of the Whole House, serving in this role until 2009. After Tim Hudak's election as PC Leader, Arnott became vice-chair of the Standing Committee on Public Accounts. Later his knowledge of House procedure was recognized with his appointment as Deputy House Leader of the Official Opposition.

=== 2010s ===
Arnott was again re-elected in the 2011 provincial election, which saw the McGuinty Liberals return with a minority Government. He was again appointed as First Deputy Chair of the Committee of the Whole House.

After New Democratic Party Leader Andrea Horwath announced her party would vote against the 2014 Liberal Budget, the new Liberal leader, Kathleen Wynne, called a provincial election for June 12, 2014. Even though the PC Party ran a poor campaign province-wide, Arnott was re-elected in Wellington-Halton Hills by a comfortable margin. Once again, he was appointed First Deputy Chair of the Committee of the Whole House. He was named PC Critic to the Minister of Economic Development, Employment, and Infrastructure, and also served as PC Critic to the Minister of Labour. In February 2017, he was named PC Critic to the Minister of the Environment and Climate Change.

Over the years, he has introduced many Private Member's Bills and Resolutions which have been passed by the Legislature or been adopted as Government Policy.

A partial list of his legislative accomplishments includes his amendment to the Highway Traffic Act allowing volunteer firefighters to use a flashing green light on their personal vehicles when responding to an emergency. His resolution highlighting the Healthy Babies, Healthy Children program led to a 500 percent increase in its budget, allowing "at risk" children to be identified and receive the needed supports to reach their full potential. His amendment to the Workplace Safety and Insurance Board Act to allow municipalities to purchase the highest level of coverage for their volunteer firefighters was adopted as a Government bill and was passed into law. His resolution calling attention to the diminishing contribution by the Government of Canada to Ontario's health care costs was passed by the House, leading to a new health funding agreement. His controversial bill supporting "double hatter" firefighters received more hours of debate at 3rd Reading than any other Private Member's Bill in the history of the Legislature. Working with a Liberal MPP, he introduced the very first bill in the history of the Ontario Legislature co-sponsored by Members from different parties. That bill established August 1 as Emancipation Day in Ontario, recognizing the day when slavery was abolished in the British Empire in 1834, and was passed into law. Another amendment he proposed to the Workplace Safety and Insurance Board Act, to ensure volunteer firefighters were covered under "presumptive legislation" in the same manner as full-time firefighters, was adopted as Government policy. Another bill he introduced, co-sponsored by Liberal and NDP MPPs was passed recognizing January 21 as "Lincoln Alexander Day" in Ontario. Later a similar bill was passed by the Parliament of Canada. His resolution proposing a massive expansion of volunteer tree-planting efforts in Ontario for the province's 150th anniversary in Confederation was passed by the House, leading to the announcement of "Ontario's Green Leaf Challenge" program.

In recent years, he has worked with local partners and advocated for infrastructure projects, including a new Groves Memorial Community Hospital, supporting renovations and improvements to the Georgetown Hospital, the Highway 6 Morriston bypass project, a new Wilfrid Laurier University campus in Halton, and a new Halton Courthouse.

In November 2016, Arnott announced his intention to run in the 2018 provincial election. On June 7, 2018, he was re-elected to the Ontario Legislature representing Wellington-Halton Hills, receiving 31,659 votes or 54% of the ballots cast by voters. Across the province, the Progressive Conservative Party of Ontario won the election.

On July 11, 2018, Arnott was elected as Speaker of the Ontario Legislature on the first ballot.

In the early months of the 42nd Provincial Parliament, Arnott struggled visibly in his new role. With a large number of newly elected MPPs routinely trading insults across the floor, his efforts to gain control of the raucous House were often drowned out by the noise.

In July 2019, the Office of the Speaker released “Rules of Respect and Courtesy in the Chamber.” In it, Arnott urged MPPs to set a higher standard of behaviour in their day-to-day activities in the Legislature's Chamber. He continued to encourage MPPs to do better, and over time the debates in the House became more respectful and issue-focused, and somewhat less divisive.

=== 2020s ===
During the COVID-19 pandemic, Arnott was empowered by the House to implement safe entry protocols which applied to everyone entering the Assembly precinct. The protocols required people to present proof of being vaccinated against COVID-19, or proof of recent, negative rapid antigen test before being admitted to the House. On December 7, 2021, Independent Cambridge MPP Belinda Karahalios was ejected from the Legislature, having refused to divulge her vaccine status to the Legislature's staff, but seeking entry to the House by presenting a negative rapid antigen test. Because she had recently tested positive for COVID-19, Arnott declared the test result to be unreliable, citing current public health advice, and expelled her from the House.

On September 26, 2020, Arnott was nominated as the Ontario Progressive Conservative Party's candidate in Wellington-Halton Hills for the 2022 provincial election. He was re-elected to the Assembly for a ninth term. On August 8, 2022, he was re-elected Speaker for the 43rd Provincial Parliament.

On April 17, 2024, in response to the situation in Palestine and Israel, Arnott prohibited Palestinian kaffiyehs from being worn by anyone — MPPs or guests — in the Ontario legislature over concerns the scarves make “an overt political statement." Ontario Premier Doug Ford immediately urged a reversal of Arnott's ban.

== Honours and recognition ==
Arnott is an Honorary Member of the Firefighters' Association of Ontario and the Ontario Association of Road Supervisors, in recognition of his work with those organizations.

In 2004, Wilfrid Laurier University named Arnott one of their graduates who are "making a difference around the world."

== Electoral history ==
2022 Ontario general election: Wellington—Halton Hills
Party	Candidate	Votes	%	±%	Expenditures
Progressive Conservative	Ted Arnott	25,049	50.61	−3.39	$72,850
New Democratic	Diane Ballantyne	7,724	15.61	−8.42	$35,782
Green	Ryan Kahro	7,002	14.15	+5.51	$31,411
Liberal	Tom Takacs	6,920	13.98	+1.20	$10,894
New Blue	Stephen Kitras	2,548	5.15		$24,046
Consensus Ontario	Ron Patava	250	0.51		$600
Total valid votes/expense limit		49,493	99.41	+0.40	$144,105
Total rejected, unmarked, and declined ballots		294	0.59	-0.40	
Turnout		49,787	48.38	-12.73	
Eligible voters		102,933			
Progressive Conservative hold		Swing		+2.52	
Source(s): "Summary of Valid Votes Cast for Each Candidate" (PDF). Elections Ontario. 2022. Archived from the original on 2023-05-18.; "Statistical Summary by Electoral District" (PDF). Elections Ontario. 2022. Archived from the original on 2023-05-21.
