= Ontario College of Trades =

Regulatory Body

- Established: 2009
- Dissolved: 2022
- Type: Professional association, Regulatory College
- Location: Ontario, Canada
- Region served: Ontario, Canada
- Members: Over 230,000
- Board Chair: Don Gosen
- Registrar & CEO: George Gritziotis
- Website: Official website

The Ontario College of Trades was the regulatory body that governs skilled trades in Ontario. The College officially opened on April 8, 2013 and its activities are mandated by the Ontario College of Trades and Apprenticeship Act, 2009 (OCTAA).

The current Ontario government has wound down its operations.

== Organization ==
The college was governed by a board of governors with 21 members—4 members from construction, industrial, motive power, and service fields. In addition each trade was represented by a trade board consisting of 4–12 members, consisting of an equal number of employers and employees.

The organization was staffed by approximately 150 professional and enforcement staff in various departments including Standards, Policy & Research, Compliance & Enforcement, Communications, and Corporate Governance.

All members of the governing structure are appointed by an independent Appointments Council, who are in turn appointed by the Lieutenant Governor in Council.

== Membership ==
Skilled trades in Ontario consist of two broad categories:

1. Compulsory trades require certification for a person to engage in the practice of the trade. Examples of compulsory trades are: electrician, tower crane operator, automotive service technician, and hairstylist.
2. Voluntary trades do not require certification for a person to engage in the practice of the trade. Examples of non-compulsory trades are: construction millwright, general carpenter, arborist, and cook.

Under the 'Ontario College of Trades and Apprenticeship Act, 2009, (OCTAA) one cannot hold themselves as having a Certificate of Qualification in either a compulsory trade or voluntary trade unless they are a member of the college (with some exceptions). As well, all apprentices must be members of the college.

Those holding Certificates of Qualification in voluntary trades before 2013 who have opted to not join the college are not required to present their Certificate of Qualification to inspectors. As well, they cannot have their Certificate of Qualification suspended or revoked by the college but as per all members, must abide by the college's Code of Ethics.

To maintain membership, members are charged a membership fee.

== Mandate of Ontario College of Trades ==
According to OCTAA, in order to ensure the safety and certification of qualifications for all journeypersons in the 23 compulsory trades and all apprentices regardless of their trade's classification, membership in the college is legally required.

All members were searchable on the college's Public Register, which was an online database that enables anyone to easily confirm the qualifications of any compulsory tradesperson or apprentice before hiring them to fix their toilet, wire their house, change their brakes or cut/colour their hair.

Like all regulatory bodies in Ontario, the college was required to be financially self-sustaining, and just like the College of Teachers or the College of Nurses, the Ontario College of Trades was funded entirely through membership fees.

Fees go towards the establishment of apprenticeship training programs, updating training and curriculum standards—some of which have not been updated in 20 years—and exams, promotion of trades to youth and underrepresented groups, and compliance activities.

== Dean Report ==
In 2015, former Secretary of Cabinet Tony Dean released a report making a number of recommendations to support the development of the College of Trades.

The recommendations in the report encompassed many areas including governance models, noting that most professional organizations have some membership elected representation. However; the primary areas covered were scopes of practice, trade classification and reclassification reviews, ratio reviews, and enforcement.

A number of construction trade unions, including the Ontario Sheet Metal Workers Conference and the International Brotherhood of Metal Workers opposed the report because it lacked consultation with stakeholders. However; the largest construction union in North America, LiUNA, has expressed cautious optimism and support for the report.

Since the release of this report, several regulations based on its recommendations have been passed by government and the college has been working on the implementation of most of Dean's suggestions.

== See also ==
- Interprovincial Standards
