= Wellington—Halton Hills (provincial electoral district) =

Provincial electoral district in Ontario, Canada

Coordinates: 43.633°N 80.166°W

Ontario electoral district
- Wellington-Halton Hills in relation to other southern Ontario ridings

Provincial electoral district
- Legislature: Legislative Assembly of Ontario
MPP
Joseph Racinsky
Progressive Conservative
- District created: 2004
- First contested: 2007
- Last contested: 2025

Demographics
- Population (2016): 120,985
- Electors (2018): 96,887
- Area (km²): 1,514
- Pop. density (per km²): 79.9
- Census division(s): Wellington County, Halton
- Census subdivision(s): Guelph, Guelph/Eramosa, Puslinch, Erin, Centre Wellington, Halton Hills

Wellington—Halton Hills is a provincial electoral district in western Ontario, Canada. It elects one member to the Legislative Assembly of Ontario.

The riding, which was first contested in the 2007 provincial election, consists of the municipalities of Guelph/Eramosa, Puslinch, Erin, Centre Wellington, and Halton Hills.

47.5% of the riding came from Halton, 25.2% came from Waterloo—Wellington, 16.3% came from Guelph—Wellington, and 11% came from Dufferin—Peel—Wellington—Grey. Although it is counted as a Midwestern Ontario riding, the Halton Hills portion is part of the Greater Toronto Area.

== Members of Provincial Parliament ==
Wellington—Halton Hills
Assembly	Years	Member	Party
Riding created from Halton, Waterloo—Wellington, Guelph—Wellington and Dufferin—Peel—Wellington—Grey
39th	2007–2011	Ted Arnott	Progressive Conservative
40th	2011–2014	Ted Arnott	Progressive Conservative
41st	2014–2018	Ted Arnott	Progressive Conservative
42nd	2018–2022	Ted Arnott	Progressive Conservative
43rd	2022–2025	Ted Arnott	Progressive Conservative
44th	2025–present	Joseph Racinsky	Progressive Conservative

== Election results ==
Winning party in each polling division of Wellington—Halton Hills at the 2025 Ontario general election

2025 Ontario general election
Party	Candidate	Votes	%	±%	Expenditures
Progressive Conservative	Joseph Racinsky	24,637	45.65	–4.96	$43,999
Liberal	Alex Hilson	14,874	27.56	+13.58	$36,869
Green	Bronwynne Wilton	8,464	15.68	+1.53	$47,917
New Democratic	Simone Kent	3,980	7.37	–8.24	$9,952
New Blue	Stephen Kitras	1,417	2.63	–2.52	$4,259
Ontario Party	Jason Medland	398	0.74	N/A	$0
Independent	Ron Patava	199	0.37	–0.14	$0
Total valid votes/expense limit		53,969	99.00	-0.41	$173,217
Total rejected, unmarked, and declined ballots		543	1.00	+0.41	
Turnout		54,512	50.69	+2.31	
Eligible voters		107,532			
Progressive Conservative hold		Swing		–9.27	
Source: Elections Ontario

Winning party in each polling division of Wellington—Halton Hills at the 2022 Ontario general election

2022 Ontario general election
Party	Candidate	Votes	%	±%	Expenditures
Progressive Conservative	Ted Arnott	25,049	50.61	−3.39	$72,850
New Democratic	Diane Ballantyne	7,724	15.61	−8.42	$35,782
Green	Ryan Kahro	7,002	14.15	+5.51	$31,411
Liberal	Tom Takacs	6,920	13.98	+1.20	$10,894
New Blue	Stephen Kitras	2,548	5.15		$24,046
Consensus Ontario	Ron Patava	250	0.51		$600
Total valid votes/expense limit		49,493	99.41	+0.40	$144,105
Total rejected, unmarked, and declined ballots		294	0.59	-0.40	
Turnout		49,787	48.38	-12.73	
Eligible voters		102,933			
Progressive Conservative hold		Swing		+2.52	
Source(s): "Summary of Valid Votes Cast for Each Candidate" (PDF). Elections Ontario. 2022. Archived from the original on May 18, 2023.; "Statistical Summary by Electoral District" (PDF). Elections Ontario. 2022. Archived from the original on May 21, 2023.

2018 Ontario general election
Party	Candidate	Votes	%	±%
Progressive Conservative	Ted Arnott	31,659	54.00	+7.32
New Democratic	Diane Ballantyne	14,087	24.03	+9.88
Liberal	Jon Hurst	7,492	12.78	-16.34
Green	Dave Rodgers	5,066	8.64	-5.51
Libertarian	Jadon Pfeiffer	320	0.55	-1.73
Total valid votes		58,624	100.0	
Total rejected, unmarked and declined ballots				
Turnout			64.26	
Eligible voters		91,228		
Progressive Conservative hold		Swing		-1.28
Source: Elections Ontario

2014 Ontario general election
Party	Candidate	Votes	%	±%
Progressive Conservative	Ted Arnott	22,600	46.68	-8.94
Liberal	Daniel Zister	14,095	29.12	+2.29
New Democratic	Michael Carlucci	6,848	14.15	-0.30
Green	Dave Rodgers	3,566	7.37	+4.27
Libertarian	Jason Cousineau	1,104	2.28	
Freedom	Mitch Sproule	198	0.40	
Total valid votes		48,411	100.00	
Progressive Conservative hold		Swing		-5.62
Source: Elections Ontario

2011 Ontario general election
Party	Candidate	Votes	%	±%
Progressive Conservative	Ted Arnott	23,495	55.62	+6.46
Liberal	Moya Johnson	11,334	26.83	-3.56
New Democratic	Dale Hamilton	6,106	14.45	+5.52
Green	Raymond Dartsch	1,309	3.10	-7.15
Total valid votes		42,244	100.00	
Total rejected, unmarked and declined ballots		137	0.32	
Turnout		42,381	51.11	
Eligible voters		82,926		
Progressive Conservative hold		Swing		+5.01
Source: Elections Ontario

2007 Ontario general election
Party	Candidate	Votes	%	±%
Progressive Conservative	Ted Arnott	21,533	49.16	-3.17
Liberal	Marg Bentley	13,312	30.39	-2.34
Green	Martin Lavictoire	4,489	10.25	
New Democratic	Noel Duignan	3,914	8.94	-0.25
Family Coalition	Giuseppe Gori	555	1.27	
Total valid votes		43,803	100.00	
Progressive Conservative hold		Swing	-0.42	

^ Change based on redistributed results

== Student vote results ==
2018 Wellington—Halton Hills student vote result
Affiliation	Candidate	Votes	%
Progressive Conservative	Ted Arnott	1,262	37.36
New Democratic	Diane Ballantyne	903	26.73
Green	Dave Rodgers	738	21.85
Liberal	Jon Hurst	387	11.46
Libertarian	Jadon Pfeiffer	88	2.61
Source: Student Vote

== 2007 electoral reform referendum ==
2007 Ontario electoral reform referendum
Side	Votes	%
First Past the Post	28,316	66.0
Mixed member proportional	14,589	34.0
Total valid votes	42,905	100.0

== See also ==
- List of Ontario provincial electoral districts
- Canadian provincial electoral districts
