= Daisy Wai =

Canadian politician

Daisy Wai MPP
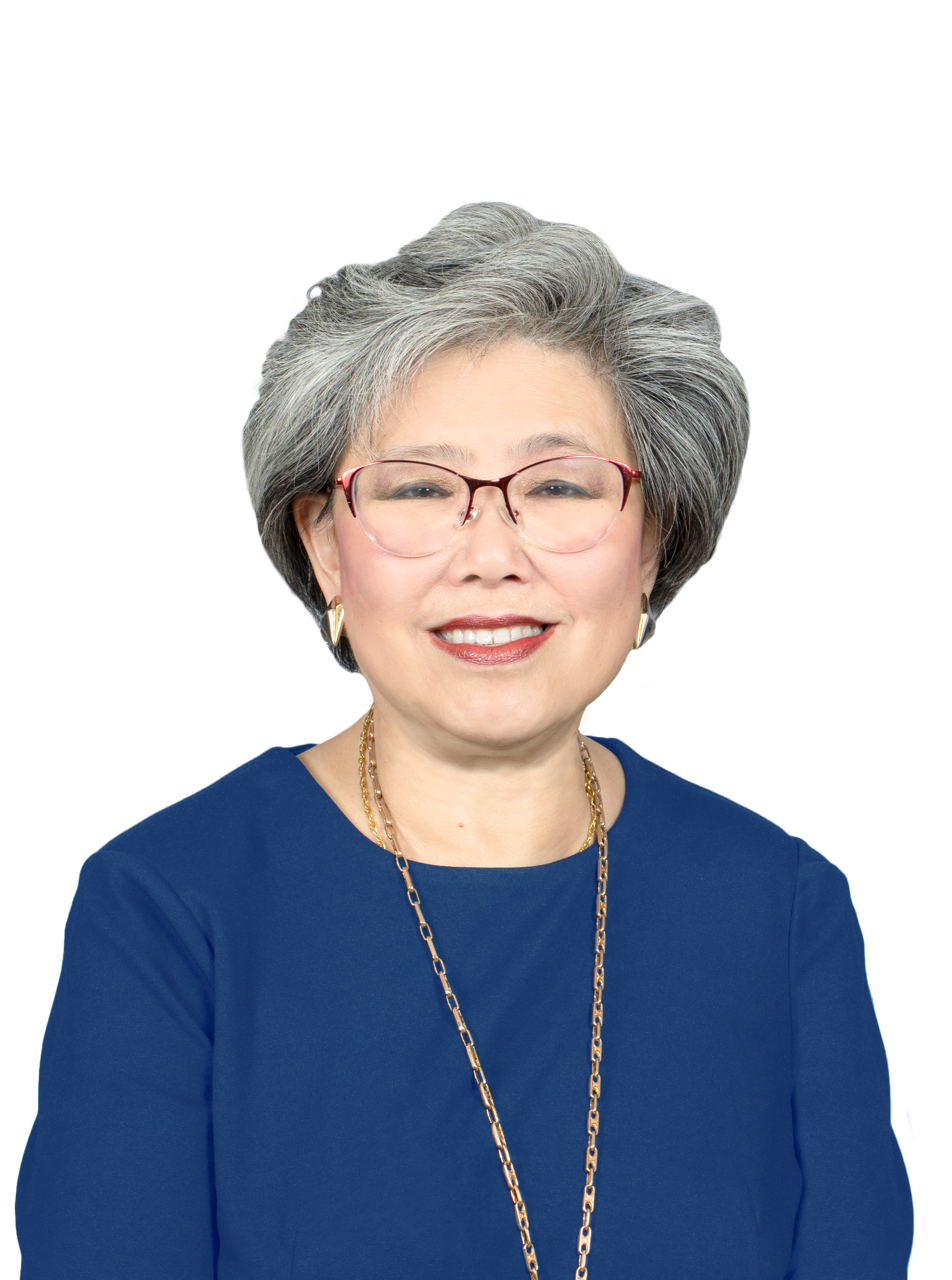

Parliamentary Assistant to the Minister of Seniors and Accessibility
- Incumbent
- Assumed office June 26, 2019
- Minister: Raymond Cho

Member of the Ontario Provincial Parliament for Richmond Hill
- Incumbent
- Assumed office June 7, 2018
- Preceded by: Reza Moridi

Personal details
- Party: Progressive Conservative Party of Ontario
- Spouse: Albert Wai
- Occupation: Businesswoman

Daisy Wai is a Canadian politician who represents the riding of Richmond Hill in the Legislative Assembly of Ontario. A member of the Progressive Conservative Party of Ontario, she was first elected in the 2018 provincial election, defeating Liberal incumbent Reza Moridi by more than 10,000 votes.

== Early career ==
Wai is an entrepreneur who launched her Canadian business through the Prosper Canada's Self-Employment Benefit program. Wai went on to serve as a member of the Prosper Canada's board of directors.

== 2018 provincial election ==
Wai stated that her objective was to encourage and increase political involvement within the Chinese community.

== Community involvement ==
Wai is a former member of the York Regional Police Services Board and a former chairperson for the Richmond Hill Chamber of Commerce.

== Awards ==
Wai is a recipient of the Queen Elizabeth Golden and Diamond Memorial Medal, Richmond Hill Chamber of Commerce Business Achievement Award, Chinese Canadian Entrepreneurs Award, Town of Richmond Hill Volunteer Achievement Award and Canada 150 Women Award.

== Electoral record ==
2025 Ontario general election: Richmond Hill
Party	Candidate	Votes	%	±%
Progressive Conservative	Daisy Wai	17,061	55.43	+3.19
Liberal	Roozbeh Farhadi	10,546	34.26	+2.36
New Democratic	Raymond Bhushan	1,771	5.75	–3.35
Green	Alison Lam	883	2.87	–0.11
New Blue	Allison Bruns	519	1.69	–0.05
Total valid votes		30,780	99.18	
Total rejected, unmarked and declined ballots		253	0.82	+0.10
Turnout		31,033	35.56	–0.58
Eligible voters		87,268		
Progressive Conservative hold		Swing		+0.41
Source: Elections Ontario

2022 Ontario general election: Richmond Hill
Party	Candidate	Votes	%	±%
Progressive Conservative	Daisy Wai	16,088	52.24	+1.00
Liberal	Roozbeh Farhadi	9,825	31.90	+3.99
New Democratic	Raymond Bhushan	2,805	9.11	–8.16
Green	Hasen Nicanfar	917	2.98	+0.10
New Blue	Les Hoffman	535	1.74	–
Ontario Party	Ramtin Biouckzadeh	519	1.69	–
Moderate	Olga Rykova	107	0.35	–
Total valid votes		30,796	99.28	
Total rejected, unmarked and declined ballots		222	0.72	–0.30
Turnout		31,018	36.14	–16.04
Eligible voters		85,825		
Progressive Conservative hold		Swing		–1.49
Source: Elections Ontario

2018 Ontario general election: Richmond Hill
Party	Candidate	Votes	%	±%
Progressive Conservative	Daisy Wai	22,224	51.24	+14.70
Liberal	Reza Moridi	12,108	27.92	–19.87
New Democratic	Marco Coletta	7,490	17.27	+6.30
Green	Walter Bauer	1,248	2.88	–0.26
Libertarian	Igor Bily	301	0.69	–0.50
Total valid votes		43,371	98.99	
Total rejected, unmarked and declined ballots		444	1.01	–0.33
Turnout		43,815	52.18	+6.49
Eligible voters		83,967		
Progressive Conservative gain from Liberal		Swing		+17.28
Source: Elections Ontario
