= Better for People, Smarter for Business Act, 2020 =

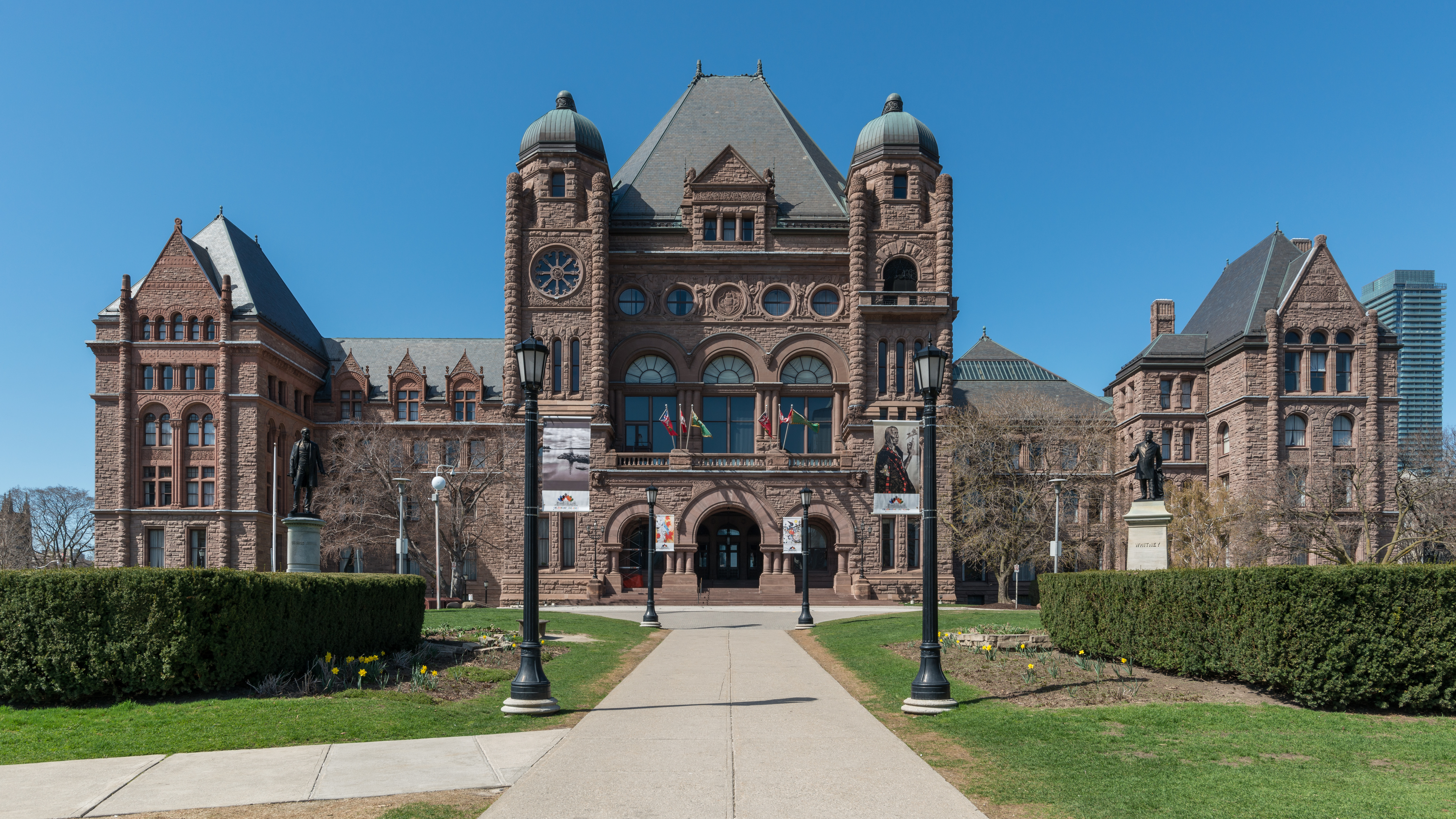

Legislative Assembly of Ontario
- Long title: An Act to reduce burdens on people and businesses by enacting, amending and repealing various Acts and revoking a regulation
- Citation: S.O. 2020, c. 34
- Royal assent: 8 December 2020

Legislative history
- Bill citation: Bill 213
- Introduced by: Prabmeet Sarkaria MPP, Associate Minister of Small Business and Red Tape Reduction
- First reading: October 6, 2020
- Second reading: November 24, 2020
- Third reading: December 7, 2020
- Status: Current legislation

The Better for People, Smarter for Business Act, 2020 (Bill 213, 2020; French: Loi de 2020 pour mieux servir la population et faciliter les affaires) is a law in the province of Ontario that made a number of changes to regulations in the province.

== Summary ==
The bill contained 28 different schedules.

Schedule 1 would amend the Business Corporations Act, including removing the minimum Canadian director residency requirement and lowering the approval threshold for a written ordinary resolution of the shareholders.

Schedule 2 would amend the Canada Christian College and School of Graduate Theological Studies Act, 1999 to grant university status to the Evangelical Christian Bible college Canada Christian College, granting it additional degree-conferring powers and renaming it to the Canada University and School of Graduate Theological Studies.

Schedule 3 amended the Change of Name Act to remove the ability of a person to marry to simply assume the surname of their spouse or for them both to combine their names. Instead, married couples would have to apply for a legal name change similarly to any other change of name.

Schedule 9 amended the Ministry of the Environment Act to allow the Minister for the Environment to set a fee for providing documents that fell under the Ministry's purview.

Schedule 13 renamed the Official Notices Publication Act as the Ontario Gazette Act and amended it to allow the Queen's Printer to determine the timing and manner of publication of The Ontario Gazette.

Schedule 15 dissolved the Ontario Highway Transport Board and repealed the Ontario Highway Transport Board Act. The Schedule also provided for the Minister of Transportation to make transitional regulations to phase out the Act.

Schedule 24 amended the Redeemer Reformed Christian College Act, 1998 to grant university status to Redeemer Reformed Christian College in Hamilton, renaming it Redeemer University.

Schedule 28 amended the Tyndale University College and Seminary Act, 2003 to grant university status to Tyndale University College & Seminary in Toronto, renaming it Tyndale University.

== Legislative history ==
The bill was introduced to the Legislative Assembly in October 2020 by Brampton South MPP and Associate Minister of Small Business and Red Tape Reduction Prabmeet Sarkaria.

It received royal assent from Lieutenant-Governor Elizabeth Dowdeswell on 7 December 2020.

== Reactions ==
The bill was criticised by some commentators for being an omnibus bill, including unrelated items to the main goal of the bill in order to try to avoid controversy.

The Association of Municipal Managers, Clerks and Treasurers of Ontario stated that the bill "takes some initial steps towards a digital-first approach," but that more was needed to be done to modernise provincial government procedures.

Schedule 3 of the Act was criticised by some as an attempt to impose a "marriage tax," with critics stating it would increase the amount of bureaucracy married couples faced.

=== Canada Christian College controversy ===
The move to grant Canada Christian College university status in particular provoked strong reactions, especially considering that it had been introduced without the Postsecondary Education Quality Assessment Board (PEQAB) having completed review of the college's request for university status.

That schedule of the bill was described by some critics as corruption, due to the college's president Charles McVety having close ties to Premier Doug Ford and having been a prominent supporter of Ford's campaign for the Progressive Conservative Party leadership in 2018. Financial information submitted to the PEQAB had additionally raised questions as to how the college's charitable funds were being used, with the information revealing that McVety and his son had been given six-figure loans from the college - owing $860,000 by the end of 2019 — which were allegedly used to buy jet skis and vehicles.

The move to grant the college university status was also criticised as the college's internal regulations were strictly conservative and the college leadership had a history of making discriminatory statements. The college's internal regulations required that students "refrain from practices that are Biblically condemned" and prohibited things such as dancing and premarital sex. McVety had previously been involved in campaigns against LGBT+ rights and updating the province's sex ed curriculum, as well as having made islamophobic statements. The college had also previously hosted events with far-right politicians, such as Geert Wilders.

== Legacy ==
CBC News named the bill one of the most controversial bills in Ontario in 2020.

In May 2021, the government announced that the “PEQAB has recommended that the institution not be granted expanded degree-granting authority or a name change at this time" and that "the minister has reviewed and accepts their recommendation.” In response to the government's decision not to implement Schedule 2 of the bill, McVety attacked the PEQAB as "political corruptness," alleging that it had misrepresented the college's application.

== See also ==
- Better for People, Smarter for Business Act, 2019
