= 2006 Cambridge municipal election =

The Cambridge municipal election, 2006 took place on November 13, 2006, for the city of Cambridge, Ontario, Canada, to elect a city mayor, city councillors, a regional chair, regional councillors, and school board members. It was held in conjunction with all other municipalities in Ontario.

== Results ==
=== Mayoral race ===
Candidate	Vote	%
Doug Craig (X)	11274	51.0
Margaret Barr	8972	40.6
Michael Sahagian	761	3.4
John Oprea	647	2.9
Marsha Gail Kriss	446	2.0

=== City council ===
Candidate	Vote	%
Ward 1
Rick Cowsill (X)	2325	55.6
Donna Reid	1328	31.8
Patrick McMahon	527	12.6
Ward 2
Karl Kiefer (X)	2400	56.7
Susan Galvao	1194	28.2
Roger Collier	269	6.4
Bev McDowell	225	5.3
Craig P. Denby	148	3.5
Ward 3
Linda Whetham (X)	1250	50.6
Nicholas Ermeta	560	22.7
Jaye Jackson	467	18.9
Brent Snyder	192	7.8
Ward 4
Ben Tucci (X)	1256	46.7
Kathryn McGarry	996	38.6
Mary Ann Christie	328	12.7
Ward 5
Pam Wolf (X)	2061	42.0
Ted Fairless	1654	33.7
Jan Liggett	1187	24.2
Ward 6
Gary Price (X)	1275	41.0
Laurie Soper	1045	33.6
Andrew Johnson	790	25.4

=== Regional councillor ===
(2 to be elected)

Candidate	Vote	%
Jane Brewer (X)	11264	31.1
Claudette Millar (X)	9826	27.1
Glen Whetham	4232	11.7
John Florence	3920	10.8
Bob McMullen	3854	10.6
Uwe Kretschmann	3134	8.7
