= 2010 Waterloo Region municipal elections =

- October 25, 2010

The Waterloo Region municipal election, 2010 were held in the Regional Municipality of Waterloo of Ontario on October 25, 2010 in conjunction with municipal elections across the province.

== Waterloo Regional Council ==
=== Chair ===
Candidate	Vote	%
Ken Seiling (X)	70,354	71.37
Robert F. Milligan	28,225	28.65

=== Council ===
Waterloo Regional Council includes the chair, the mayors of the seven constituent municipalities (see below) plus the following council races:

Candidate	Vote	%
Cambridge (2 to be elected)
Jane Brewer (X)	10,866	29.5
Claudette Millar (X)	9,270	25.1
Atinuke Bankole	6,086	16.5
Glen A. Whetham	5,970	16.2
Robert A. Ross	4,681	12.7
Kitchener (4 to be elected)
Tom Galloway (X)	22,268	19.38
Jim Wideman (X)	19,437	16.91
Geoff Lorentz	15,848	13.79
Jean Haalboom (X)	15,399	13.40
Barbara J. da Silva	11,217	9.76
Derek Satnik	7,939	6.91
Kristen Porritt	7,375	6.42
Jason Hammond	7,272	6.33
Leszek Jankowski	5,169	4.50
Martin Schell	3.006	2.62
Waterloo (2 to be elected)
Sean Strickland (X)	17,098	47
Jane Mitchell (X)	14,829	40.77
Jack Hone	4,448	12.23

== Plebiscite ==
Question "Should the Region of Waterloo fluoridate your municipal water?"
Choice	Vote	%
No	15,461	
Yes	15,266	

(Vote only held in the City of Waterloo, and in the part of Woolwich and the small part of Kitchener that receive their water through the same system as Waterloo.)

Question "Do you support the members of Kitchener and Waterloo councils engaging in discussions about the advantages and disadvantages of merging the cities of Kitchener and Waterloo?"
Choice	Vote (Kitchener)	Vote (Waterloo)	Vote (Total)
Yes	23,116 (65.0%)	9,262 (34.6%)	32,378 (51.0%)
No	12,458 (35.0%)	17,478 (65.4%)	29,936 (49.0%)

Voters in Kitchener overwhelmingly supported the measure, while voters in Waterloo were overwhelmingly against it.

== Cambridge ==
Mayoral Candidate	Vote	%
Doug Craig (X)	11,230	47.8
Linda Whetham	6,727	28.6
Andrew Johnson	5,537	23.6

City Council Candidate	Vote	%
Ward 1
Donna Reid (X)	585	21.7
Mike Devine	535	19.9
Gord Hobbs	432	16.0
John Cosman	362	13.4
Steve Halicki	199	7.4
Joseph Gowing	167	6.2
Barbara Bierman	140	5.2
Sean McCafferty	132	4.9
Warren Pinder	91	3.4
Paulo Santos	51	1.9
Ward 2
Rick Cowsill* (X)	1,856	58.5
Sandra Hill	876	27.6
Mark Fox	225	7.1
Visario Moustakas	217	6.8
Ward 3
Karl Kiefer* (X)	1,364	49.1
Mike Toffner	640	23.0
Brian Santos	564	20.3
Bev McDowell	210	7.55
Ward 4
Ben Tucci* (X)	1,478	56.8
Jan Liggett	1,122	43.2
Ward 5
Pam Wolf* (X)	2,344	71.4
Brett Hagey	513	15.6
Rhonda MacDougall-Butcher	426	13.0
Ward 6
Gary Price* (X)	1,410	39.1
Thomas Vann	1,181	32.8
Shannon Adshade	1,013	28.1
Ward 7
Frank Monteiro* (X)	1,241	62.5
Gary Berger	519	26.1
Frank Curnew	226	11.4
Ward 8
Nicholas Ermeta (X)	1,274	42.8
Gail Moorhouse	736	24.7
Susan Galvao	724	24.3
Bill Kirby	246	8.3

== Kitchener ==
Mayoral Candidate	Vote	%
Carl Zehr (X)	29,939	79.17
Frank Kulscar	4,072	10.77
Don Pinnell	3,805	10.06

== North Dumfries ==
Mayoral Candidate	Vote	%
Robert Deutschmann	1,936	56.3
Kim Denouden (X)	1,505	43.7

== Waterloo ==
Mayoral Candidate	Vote	%
Brenda Halloran (X)	12,247	
Jan d'Ailly	7,092	
Dale Ross	5,466	
Franklin Ramsoomair	1,987	

== Wellesley ==
Mayoral Candidate	Vote	%
Ross Kelterborn (X)	Acclaimed	

== Wilmot ==
Mayoral Candidate	Vote	%
Lee Armstrong	2,138	
Terry Broda	1,784	
Eliot Fung	1,527	
Paul Knowles	1,333	

Incumbent mayor Wayne Roth is not running again in 2010.

== Woolwich ==
Mayoral Candidate	Vote	%
Todd Cowan	2,777	
Pat McLean	1,784	
William L. Strauss (X)	1,483	

_{* = incumbent}
