= List of mayors of Cambridge, Ontario =

This is a list of mayors of Cambridge, Ontario. The mayor presides over Cambridge, Ontario City Council.

== Mayors ==
- Claudette Millar — 1973-1974
- Robert Kerr — 1974-1976
- Erwin Nelson — 1976-1978
- Claudette Millar — 1978-1988
- Jane Brewer — 1988-2000
- Doug Craig — 2000-2018
- Kathryn McGarry — 2018-2022
- Jan Liggett — 2022-2026
- Scott Hamilton — 2026–present
