= 2018 Waterloo Region municipal elections =

- October 22, 2018

The 2018 Waterloo Region municipal elections were held on October 22, 2018 in the Regional Municipality of Waterloo, Ontario, Canada, to elect Waterloo Regional Council, the mayors and city councils of Cambridge, Kitchener, North Dumfries, Waterloo, Wellesley, Wilmot, and Woolwich, the Waterloo Region District School Board (Public), the Waterloo Catholic District School Board, and the regional members of Conseil Scolaire de District Catholiques Centre-Sud and Conseil Scolaire Viamonde (Public). The election was held in conjunction with the province wide 2018 municipal elections.

Names in bold denotes elected candidates.

(X) denotes incumbent.

== Waterloo Regional Council ==
=== Chair ===
Candidate	Vote	%
**Karen Redman**	66,370	62.40
Robert Deutschmann	19,966	18.77
Jan d'Ailly	10,353	9.73
Jay Aissa	9,675	9.10

The election for Regional Chair was marked by the departure of Ken Seiling, who served 33 years as chair. Karen Redman ran with experience as a regional councillor and former Member of Parliament for Kitchener Centre. Also running were a former mayor of the North Dumfries Rob Deutschmann, who as mayor also served as a regional councillor, former councillor in the lower-tier municipality of the City of Waterloo Jan d'Ailly, and businessman Jay Aissa, both of whom overperformed in the City of Cambridge.

The CBC received responses on priorities from each candidate. Redman ran on a message of both economic development and some progressive priorities, including opioid, mental health and social housing issues. Deutschmann ran on a similar tone on issues, with an additional focus on increasing funding to police and emergency response services. d'Ailly ran on a progressive platform, with emphasis placed on the opioid crisis, inclusionary zoning, increasing social supports, reducing deaths due to automobiles, and increasing economic progressivity in the taxation and benefit structure of the Region's finances. Aissa ran on construction of a new hospital, fiscal conservatism, increasing geographic access of rapid transit to less-served municipalities, road state of repair and increasing funding to police and other first responders

Redman won majorities in all seven cities and municipalities of Waterloo Region, including North Dumfries, where Deutschmann served as mayor. Results were slow, with official results not announced until two days after the election, not due to a close ballot count, but due to province-wide technical issues with the electronic voting system that required some extensions to voting in certain areas in the Region.

=== Council ===
Waterloo Regional Council includes the chair, the mayors of the seven constituent municipalities (see below) plus the following council races:

Candidate	Vote	%
Cambridge (2 to be elected)
**Karl Kiefer** (X)	13,209	32.50
**Helen G. Jowett** (X)	12,801	31.49
John Florence	7,726	19.01
Jeffrey Shaver	4,019	9.89
Rob Brunette	2,890	7.11
Kitchener (4 to be elected)
**Tom Galloway** (X)	23,078	19.15
**Elizabeth Clarke** (X)	21,037	17.46
**Michael D. Harris**	16,935	14.06
**Geoff Lorentz** (X)	16,599	13.78
Kari Williams	11,326	9.40
Ted Martin	11,286	9.37
Fauzia Mazhar	9,942	8.25
Tom Hiller	5,497	4.56
Jason House	4,787	3.97
Waterloo (2 to be elected)
**Jim Erb**	13,089	32.68
**Sean Strickland** (X)	10,776	26.90
Jane Mitchell (X)	9,472	23.65
Beisan Zubi	5,147	12.85
Bob Oberholtzer	1,572	3.92

== Cambridge ==
=== Referendum ===
Referendum on ranked ballots: "Are you in favour of the City of Cambridge using a ranked ballot system for the 2022 municipal election?"

Choice	Vote	%
**Yes**	13,488	56.35
No	10,449	43.65

As the only 27.27% of eligible voters voted in the referendum, the results are non binding.

List of candidates:

=== Mayor ===
Mayoral Candidate	Vote	%
**Kathryn McGarry**	13,404	47.72
Doug Craig (X)	7,394	26.32
Ben Tucci	4,902	17.45
Colin Tucker	1,553	5.53
Randy Carter	836	2.98
**Total**	**28,089**	**100.00**
Source: City of Cambridge

=== Cambridge City Council ===
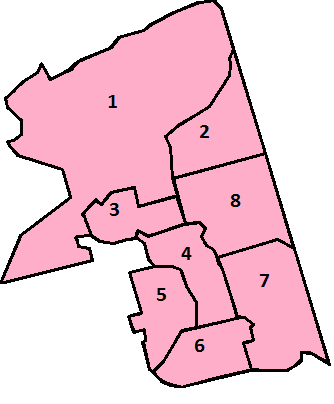
Map of Cambridge's eight wards

Candidate	Vote	%
Ward 1
**Donna Reid** (X)	1,040	33.40
Clifford Vanclief	580	18.63
Cliff Eggleton	555	17.82
Kevin Hiebert	341	10.95
Stewart Allan	224	7.19
Ryan O'Hagdan	196	6.29
Peter Crystal	178	5.72
Ward 2
**Mike Devine** (X)	2,404	57.87
Janice Lajeunesse	555	13.36
Jeff Richardson	518	12.47
Jay Brown	468	11.27
Jaanus Kimsto	209	5.03
Ward 3
**Mike Mann** (X)	1,639	52.79
Tracy Hipel	1,198	38.58
Patricia Bercowski	268	8.63
Ward 4
**Jan Liggett** (X)	1,685	59.71
Gary Price	990	35.08
Edwin Friest	147	5.21
Ward 5
**Pam Wolf** (X)	2,285	57.23
Bill Kirby	1,129	28.27
Brett Wagner	579	14.50
Ward 6
**Shannon Ashdale** (X)	1,516	39.56
Sandy Falkiner	826	21.56
Peter Renco	578	15.08
Kurt Ditner	569	14.85
Stephen Davis	343	8.95
Ward 7
**Frank Monteiro** (X)	1,016	47.12
Connie Cody	685	31.77
Ryan Coles	237	10.99
Cody Botelho	218	10.11
Ward 8
**Nicholas Ermeta** (X)	2,413	64.81
Carla Johnson	1,102	29.60
Kenneth R. Bartlett	208	5.59

==== By-election ====
Following the death of Frank Monteiro, a by-election was held in Ward 7 on October 5, 2020:

Council Candidate	Vote	%
**Scott Hamilton**	392	31.84
Connie Cody	361	29.33
Manuel da Silva	187	15.19
Cole Boland	166	13.48
Vandan Patel	81	6.58
Simon Weresch	19	1.54
R. J. Johnston	13	1.06
Cody Botelho	12	0.97
Sandra Lemieux	0	0.00

== Kitchener ==
List of candidates:

=== Mayor ===
Mayoral Candidate	Vote	%
**Berry Vrbanovic** (X)	34,983	85.47
Narine Sookram	2,304	5.63
Myron Steinman	1,985	4.85
Jiri Marek	1,659	4.05

=== Kitchener City Council ===
Map of Kitchener's 10 wards

Candidate	Vote	%
Ward 1
**Scott Davey** (X)	2,683	61.73
Susan Stark	646	14.86
Stephanie Stretch	638	14.68
Marcus Drasdo	311	7.16
Aasia Khatoon	68	1.56
Ward 2
**Dave Schnider** (X)	3,405	59.67
Fitzroy Vanderpool	1,315	23.05
Suresh Arangath	653	11.44
Regan Sunshine Brussé	333	5.84
Ward 3
**John Gazzola** (X)	1,621	66.08
James Howe	686	27.97
Paras Solanki	108	4.40
Robert Souliere	38	1.55
Ward 4
**Christine Michaud**	1,423	39.24
Julie Geary	728	20.08
Wes Hill	701	19.33
Florence Carbray	419	11.56
Sasha Sidhu	355	9.79
Ward 5
**Kelly Galloway-Sealock** (X)	1,779	65.91
Andres Fuentes	455	16.86
Sonal Pandya	261	9.67
Aizad Ahmad	204	7.56
Ward 6
**Paul Singh** (X)	2,733	80.71
Narendra Grover	653	19.29
Ward 7
**Bil Ioannidis** (X)	2,631	52.44
Hanna Domagala	2,168	43.21
Dharmesh Patel	218	4.35
Ward 8
**Margaret Johnston**	1,946	49.24
Zyg Janecki (X)	1,645	41.62
James Baskin	361	9.13
Ward 9
**Debbie Chapman**	2,162	52.15
Melissa Bowman	1,377	33.21
Philip Molto	297	7.16
Tia Driver	200	4.82
Steve Strohack	110	2.65
Ward 10
**Sarah Marsh** (X)	3,911	76.39
Peter Meier	1,209	23.61

== North Dumfries ==
=== Mayor ===
Mayoral Candidate	Vote	%
**Sue Foxton** (X)	2,305	80.93
Martin Harrison	543	19.07

== Waterloo ==
List of candidates:

=== Mayor ===
Mayoral Candidate	Vote	%
**Dave Jaworsky** (X)	17,307	70.85
Kelly Steiss	5,530	22.64
Chris Kolednik	1,592	6.52

=== Waterloo City Council ===
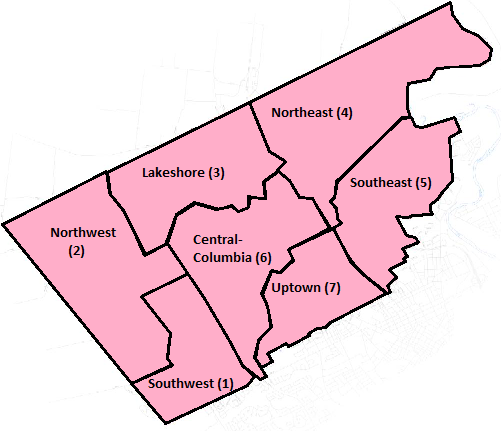
Map of Waterloo's seven wards

Candidate	Vote	%
Ward 1 - Southwest
**Sandra Hanmer**	1,150	32.28
Robert Parent	724	20.32
Leia Lei	655	18.38
Rainer Neufeld	552	15.49
Adam McCarthy	482	13.53
Ward 2 - Northwest
**Royce Bodaly**	781	28.29
John Arthur McCarthy	762	27.60
Janice Moore	658	23.83
Xin Tan	560	20.28
Ward 3 - Lakeshore
**Angela Vieth** (X)	1,710	52.29
Kim Eckel	1,560	47.71
Ward 4 - Northeast
**Diane Freeman** (X)	2,461	71.23
Liangan Yin	994	28.77
Ward 5 - Southeast
**Jen Vasic**	2,004	52.89
Mark Whaley (X)	1,785	47.11
Ward 6 - Central-Columbia
**Jeff Henry** (X)	1,989	73.78
Oliver Campbell	574	21.29
William Hodgins	133	4.93
Ward 7 - Uptown
**Tenille Bonoguore**	1,750	40.82
Elizabeth Sproule	1,335	31.14
Carol Parsons	620	14.46
Rami Said	362	8.44
Devon McKenzie	220	5.13

== Wellesley ==
=== Mayor ===
Mayoral Candidate	Vote	%
**Joe Nowak** (X)	1,271	50.46
Bernia Wheaton	1,248	49.54

== Wilmot ==
=== Mayor ===
Mayoral Candidate	Vote	%
**Les Armstrong** (X)	3,016	50.71
John Jordan	2,931	49.29

== Woolwich ==
=== Mayor ===
Mayoral Candidate	Vote	%
**Sandy Shantz** (X)	Acclaimed	
