= Doug Craig =

Doug Craig may refer to:

- Doug Craig (politician), mayor of Cambridge, Ontario, Canada
- Douglas Craig, former chairman of York City Football Club
