= Kitchener City Council =

City council of Kitchener, Ontario, Canada

Kitchener City Council is the governing body for the city of Kitchener, Ontario, Canada.

The council consists of the Mayor of Kitchener and 10 ward councillors.

== 2006-2010 ==
Council elected in the 2006 municipal election.

Councillor	Ward	Notes
Carl Zehr	Mayor	
John Smola	Ward 1	
Berry Vrbanovic	Ward 2	
John Gazzola	Ward 3	
Kelly Galloway	Ward 4	
Geoff Lorentz	Ward 5	
Christina Weylie	Ward 6	

== 2010-2014 ==
Council elected in the 2010 municipal election.

Councillor	Ward	Notes
Carl Zehr	Mayor	
Scott Davey	Ward 1	
Berry Vrbanovic	Ward 2	
John Gazzola	Ward 3	
Yvonne Fernandes	Ward 4	
Kelly Galloway	Ward 5	
Paul Singh	Ward 6	
Bill Ioannidis	Ward 7	
Zyg Janecki	Ward 8	
Frank Etherington	Ward 9	
Dan Glenn-Graham	Ward 10	

== 2014-2018 ==
Council elected in the 2014 municipal election.

Councillor	Ward	Communities
Berry Vrbanovic	Mayor	At-large
Scott Davey	Ward 1	Bridgeport, RiverRidge, Rosemount, Heritage Park
Dave Schnider	Ward 2	Stanley Park, Centreville
John Gazzola	Ward 3	Parkway, Vanier, Country Hills East, Hidden Valley, Pioneer Tower
Yvonne Fernandes	Ward 4	Strasburg, Doon
Kelly Galloway-Sealock	Ward 5	Laurentian West, Huron Park, Williamsburg
Paul Singh	Ward 6	Laurentian Hills, Country Hills, Alpine Village
Bill Ioannidis	Ward 7	Forest Heights, Waldau
Zyg Janecki	Ward 8	Forest Hills, Victoria Hills
Frank Etherington	Ward 9	Victoria Park, Southdale, Cherry Hill, Rockway
Sarah Marsh	Ward 10	Fairfield, Northward, Central Frederick, Auditorium, King East, Eastwood

== 2018-2022 ==
Council elected in the 2018 municipal election.

Councillor	Ward	Communities
Berry Vrbanovic	Mayor	At-large
Scott Davey	Ward 1	Bridgeport, RiverRidge, Rosemount, Heritage Park
Dave Schnider	Ward 2	Stanley Park, Centreville
John Gazzola	Ward 3	Parkway, Vanier, Country Hills East, Hidden Valley, Pioneer Tower
Christine Michaud	Ward 4	Strasburg, Doon
Kelly Galloway-Sealock	Ward 5	Laurentian West, Huron Park, Williamsburg
Paul Singh	Ward 6	Laurentian Hills, Country Hills, Alpine Village
Bill Ioannidis	Ward 7	Forest Heights, Waldau
Margaret Johnston	Ward 8	Forest Hills, Victoria Hills
Debbie Chapman	Ward 9	Victoria Park, Southdale, Cherry Hill, Rockway
Sarah Marsh	Ward 10	Fairfield, Northward, Central Frederick, Auditorium, King East, Eastwood

== 2022-2026 ==
Council elected in the 2022 municipal election.

Councillor	Ward	Communities
Berry Vrbanovic	Mayor	At-large
Scott Davey	Ward 1	Bridgeport, RiverRidge, Rosemount, Heritage Park
Dave Schnider	Ward 2	Stanley Park, Centreville
Jason Deneault	Ward 3	Parkway, Vanier, Country Hills East, Hidden Valley, Pioneer Tower
Christine Michaud	Ward 4	Strasburg, Doon
Ayo Owodunni	Ward 5	Laurentian West, Huron Park, Williamsburg
Paul Singh	Ward 6	Laurentian Hills, Country Hills, Alpine Village
Bill Ioannidis	Ward 7	Forest Heights, Waldau
Margaret Johnston	Ward 8	Forest Hills, Victoria Hills
Debbie Chapman	Ward 9	Victoria Park, Southdale, Cherry Hill, Rockway
Aislinn Clancy (until 2023)	Ward 10	Fairfield, Northward, Central Frederick, Auditorium, King East, Eastwood
