= Cambridge City Council (disambiguation) =

Cambridge City Council may refer to:

- Cambridge City Council, England
- Cambridge City Council, Massachusetts, USA
- Cambridge, Ontario City Council, Canada
