= Gerry Martiniuk =

Canadian politician (1937–2017)

Ontario MPP
- In office June 8, 1995 – October 6, 2011
- Preceded by: Mike Farnan
- Succeeded by: Rob Leone
- Constituency: Cambridge

Personal details
- Born: August 5, 1937 Toronto, Ontario, Canada
- Died: May 2, 2017 (aged 79) Cambridge, Ontario, Canada
- Party: Progressive Conservative
- Spouse: Christine Martiniuk
- Children: 4
- Occupation: Lawyer

Gerald Martiniuk (August 5, 1937 – May 2, 2017) was a politician in Ontario, Canada. He was a Progressive Conservative member of the Legislative Assembly of Ontario from 1995 to 2011 who represented the southern Ontario riding of Cambridge.

== Background ==
Martiniuk was born on August 5, 1937, in Toronto. He was educated at Lawrence Park Collegiate Institute, University of Western Ontario, University of Toronto (Political Science and Economics) and Osgoode Hall Law School.

== Politics ==
Martiniuk began his career at the municipal level, serving as a school trustee on the Waterloo County Board of Education, an alderman in Preston, and chair of the Waterloo Regional Police Commission.

In the 1995 provincial election, he was elected in the riding of Cambridge over incumbent New Democrat Mike Farnan.

He was easily re-elected in the 1999 election, defeating Liberal Jerry Boyle by over 14,000 votes. In 1998 he was appointed as Parliamentary Assistant to the Attorney General.

The PCs were defeated in the provincial election of 2003, although Martiniuk was again re-elected, this time defeating Boyle by just over 3000 votes. He served as opposition critic for several portfolios including Labour, Consumer and Business Services, Community and Social Services Critic and Seniors.

In 2004, he supported John Tory's successful bid replace Ernie Eves as provincial PC leader. Martiniuk was again elected in the provincial election of 2007 with a plurality of 3243. He served as the critic for Revenue and Seniors. In 2008 he supported Tim Hudak's successful PC leadership bid. In 2011, he introduced the Ukrainian Heritage Bill which sets September 7 as Ukrainian Heritage Day in Ontario to mark the anniversary of the arrival of the first Ukrainian immigrants to Canada in 1891. The bill was passed on March 30, 2011.

On October 14, 2010, Martiniuk announced his decision not to run in 2011 election.

== Affiliations ==
He was a director of the St. John Ambulance, Cambridge United Way, Preston-Hespeler Rotary Club, Trinity Community Table, Preston YMCA, Chair, Conestoga College Advisory Committee on Criminology before entering provincial politics, and served as president of the Cambridge Chamber of Commerce.

== Personal life/death ==
He and his wife Christine raised four children. He died in Cambridge, Ontario, at the age of 79.

== Electoral record ==
2007 Ontario general election: Cambridge
Party	Candidate	Votes	%	±%	Expenditures
Progressive Conservative	Gerry Martiniuk	17,942	41.70		$69,486
Liberal	Kathryn McGarry	14,704	34.17	–	$58,836
New Democratic	Mitchel Healey	5,896	13.70		$11,877
Green	Colin Carmichael	3,842	8.93	–	$3,988
Family Coalition	Paul Vandervet	646	1.50	–	$2,915
Total valid votes		43,030	100.00		
Rejected, unmarked and declined ballots		303			
Turnout		43,333	49.69		
Electors on the lists		87,203			
