= 2022 Waterloo Region municipal elections =

2022 Waterloo Chair election
- October 24, 2022
- Turnout: 25.34%
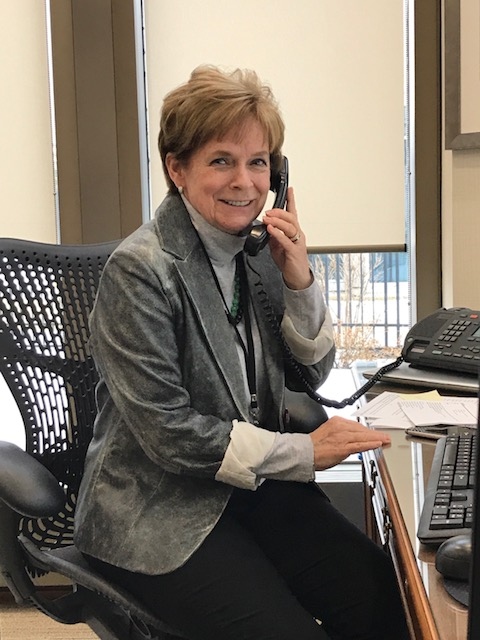
		BJD	NDS
Candidate	Karen Redman	Brendon John Da Costa	Narine Dat Sookram
Popular vote	68,084	19,909	6,158
Percentage	72.21%	21.15%	6.54%
Chair before election
Karen Redman
Elected Chair
Karen Redman

The 2022 Waterloo Region municipal elections were held on October 24, 2022, in the Regional Municipality of Waterloo, Ontario, Canada, to elect Waterloo Regional Council, the mayors and city councils of Cambridge, Kitchener, North Dumfries, Waterloo, Wellesley, Wilmot, and Woolwich, the Waterloo Region District School Board (Public), the Waterloo Catholic District School Board, and the regional members of Conseil Scolaire de District Catholiques Centre-Sud and Conseil Scolaire Viamonde (Public). The elections were part of the wider 2022 Ontario municipal elections.

(X) denotes incumbent.

== Waterloo Regional Council ==
=== Chair ===
Incumbent chair Karen Redman ran for re-election.

Candidate	Vote	%
Karen Redman (X)	68,084	72.31
Brendon John Da Costa	19,909	21.15
Narine Dat Sookram	6,158	6.54

=== Council ===
Waterloo Regional Council includes the chair, the mayors of the seven constituent municipalities (see below) and eight directly elected councillors from the three main cities:

Candidate	Vote	%
Cambridge (2 to be elected)
Doug Craig	12,688	28.79
Pam Wolf	10,001	22.69
Tyler Calver	8,947	20.30
Prakash Venkataraman	5,118	11.61
Bobbi Stewart	4,197	9.52
Crystal Whetham	3,118	7.08
Kitchener (4 to be elected)
Colleen James	13,519	13.49
Michael Harris (X)	11,628	11.61
Kari Williams	10,703	10.68
Robert Deutschmann	10,102	10.08
Matt Rodrigues	9,714	9.70
Heather Caron	7,293	7.28
Michael Parkinson	7,019	7.01
Mary Henein Thorn	5,195	5.19
Joe Gowing	4,828	4.82
Mac Graham	4,826	4.82
Tom Hiller	4,388	4.38
Duncan McLean	3,978	3.97
Soo Bok Lee	3,851	3.84
Iffat Sultana Riasat	3,137	3.13
Waterloo (2 to be elected)
Jim Erb (X)	12,541	35.30
Chantal Huinink	4,655	13.10
Jim Bolger	3,456	9.73
Cindy Watkin	3,284	9.24
John Vieth	2,538	7.14
Mark Fisher	2,450	6.90
Gord Greavette	2,438	6.86
James Ball	1,988	5.60
Peter Neufeld	1,431	4.03
Ryan Keating	747	2.10

== Cambridge ==
List of candidates:

=== Mayor ===
2022 Cambridge Mayoral election
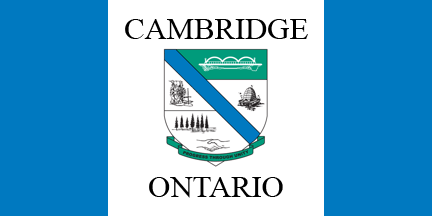
- October 24, 2022
- Turnout: 28.87%
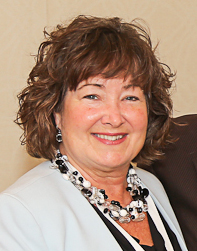
	JL
Candidate	Jan Liggett	Kathryn McGarry
Popular vote	12,567	11,441
Percentage	46.22%	42.08%
Candidate	Randy Carter	Cody Allen Botelho
Popular vote	1,644	1,538
Percentage	6.05%	5.66%
Mayor before election
Kathryn McGarry
Elected mayor
Jan Liggett

Incumbent mayor Kathryn McGarry ran against city councillor Jan Liggett.

Mayoral Candidate	Vote	%
Jan Liggett	12,567	46.22
Kathryn McGarry (X)	11,441	42.08
Randy Carter	1,644	6.05
Cody Botelho	1,538	5.66

=== Cambridge City Council ===
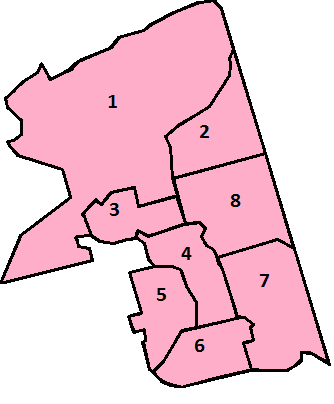
Map of Cambridge's eight wards

Candidate	Vote	%
Ward 1
Donna Reid (X)	1,108	35.09
Helen Shwery	1,062	33.63
Paul Brown	595	18.84
Erick Takor	393	12.44
Ward 2
Mike Devine (X)	2,343	61.61
Piyush Nanda	739	19.43
Matt Rogers	721	18.96
Ward 3
Corey Kimpson	1,152	37.17
Nate Whalen	769	24.81
Belinda Karahalios	449	14.49
Michele Braniff	415	13.39
Tracy Hipel	314	10.13
Ward 4
Ross Earnshaw	1,215	39.44
Clifford Vanclief	692	22.46
Usman Lalva	680	22.07
Barbara Harrington	494	16.03
Ward 5
Sheri Roberts	1,550	38.33
Amanda Maxwell	1,208	29.87
Jim Karahalios	859	21.24
Naeem Awan	271	6.70
Mark D. Fisher	156	3.86
Ward 6
Adam Cooper	1,336	35.22
Shannon Adshade (X)	857	22.59
Bill Conway	795	20.96
Kris Langford	452	11.92
Eian Campbell	353	9.31
Ward 7
Scott Hamilton (X)	1,514	67.95
Manuel da Silva	420	18.85
Chris Sim	294	13.20
Ward 8
Nicholas Ermeta (X)	2,295	63.17
Vandan Patel	634	17.45
David Hood	430	11.84
Jack Perkes	274	7.54

==== By-election ====
A by-election was held on November 13, 2023 in Ward 1 following the death of councillor Donna Reid. Shwery is a founding board member of the New Blue Party of Ontario.

The results were as follows:

Candidate	Vote	%
Helen Shwery	944	49.17
Karl Kiefer	623	32.45
Michelle Goodridge	256	13.33
Richard Kaufman	97	5.05

== Kitchener ==
List of candidates:

=== Mayor ===
2022 Kitchener Mayoral election
- October 24, 2022
- Turnout: 20.26%
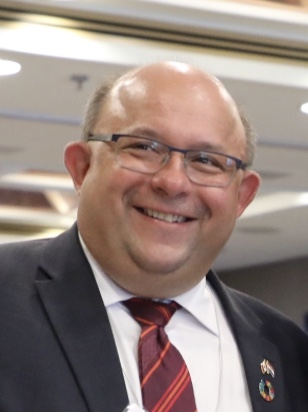
		VN	MN
Candidate	Berry Vrbanovic	Val Neekman	Manikantan Nair
Popular vote	26,846	3,097	1,817
Percentage	79.97%	9.23%	5.41%
Mayor before election
Berry Vrbanovic
Elected mayor
Berry Vrbanovic

Mayor Berry Vrbanovic ran for re-election.

Mayoral Candidate	Vote	%
Berry Vrbanovic (X)	26,846	79.97
Val Neekman	3,097	9.23
Manikantan Nair	1,817	5.41
Rehman-Ullah Khan	1,067	3.18
Milos Sokollu Posavljak	742	2.21

=== Kitchener City Council ===
Map of Kitchener's 10 wards

Candidate	Vote	%
Ward 1
Scott Davey (X)	2,375	68.68
Simon Guthrie	704	20.36
Alan Becirevic	284	8.21
Prashant Deol	95	2.75
Ward 2
Dave Schnider (X)	3,284	81.98
Derrick Rabethge	416	10.38
Asher Shahzad	306	7.64
Ward 3
Jason Deneault	532	29.70
Bryan Richardson	348	19.43
Rosanne Berwick	337	18.82
Marijo Howard	228	12.73
Matthew Griffin	174	9.72
Devon Harnarain	172	9.60
Ward 4
Christine Michaud (X)	1,638	57.86
John Vandonk	842	29.74
Al Akbar	351	12.40
Ward 5
Ayo Owodunni	844	31.52
Jon Massimi	724	27.04
Ajmer S. Mandur	701	26.18
Naveed Najmuddin	235	8.78
Farah Muhammad	174	6.50
Ward 6
Paul Singh (X)	2,060	74.94
Anwar Arkani	689	25.06
Ward 7
Bil Ioannidis (X)	1,620	41.55
Kevin McCrea	1,216	31.19
Colin Maley	1,063	27.26
Ward 8
Margaret Johnston (X)	2,596	88.30
Aleena Aftab	344	11.70
Ward 9
Debbie Chapman (X)	2,276	59.89
Brooklin Wallis	974	25.63
David Redman	288	7.58
Beth Warren	106	2.79
Alex Shevchenko	79	2.08
Matthew Robson	77	2.03
Ward 10
Aislinn Clancy	1,765	36.15
Stephanie Stretch	1,650	33.80
Peter Davis	513	10.51
Phong Tran	398	8.15
Daniel J. Fife	346	7.09
Lana Hiscock	210	4.30

== North Dumfries ==
Sue Foxton was re-elected as mayor by acclamation:

=== Mayor ===
Mayoral Candidate	Vote	%
Sue Foxton (X)	Acclaimed	

== Waterloo ==
List of candidates:

=== Mayor ===
2022 Waterloo Mayoral election
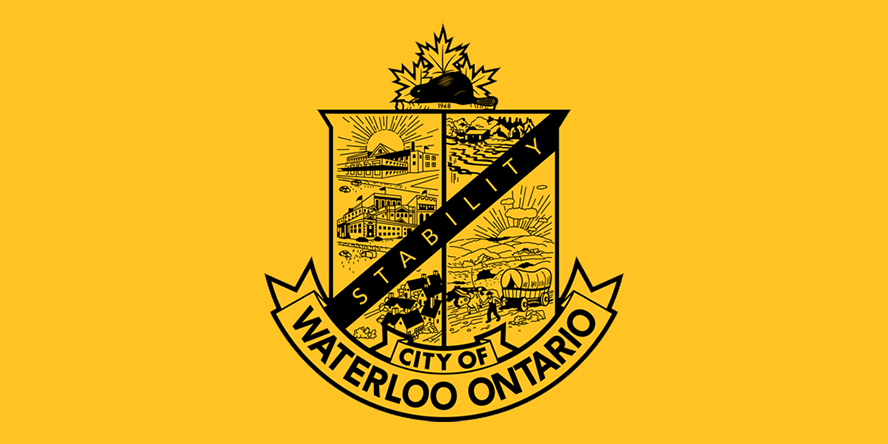
- October 24, 2022
- Turnout: 27.18%
Candidate	Dorothy McCabe	Shannon Weber	Rob Evans
Popular vote	9,543	9,212	2,474
Percentage	43.53%	42.02%	11.28%
Mayor before election
Dave Jaworsky
Elected mayor
Dorothy McCabe

Incumbent mayor Dave Jaworsky did not seek re-election.

Mayoral Candidate	Vote	%
Dorothy McCabe	9,543	43.53
Shannon Weber	9,212	42.02
Rob Evans	2,474	11.28
Kypp Saunders	694	3.17
Total	22,435	

=== Waterloo City Council ===
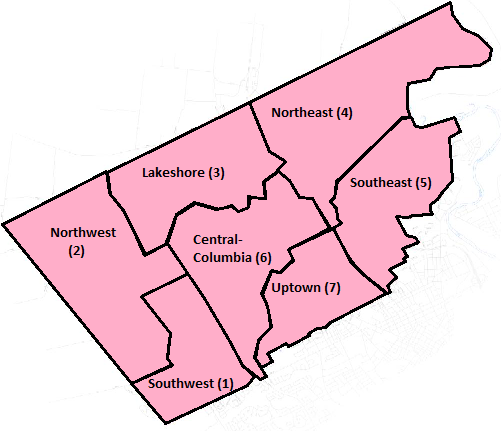
Map of Waterloo's seven wards

Candidate	Vote	%
Ward 1 - Southwest
Sandra Hanmer (X)	1,675	57.03
Robert Parent	1,262	42.97
Ward 2 - Northwest
Royce Bodaly (X)	1,568	66.55
Khaled Berbash	703	29.84
Shaheen Mujahid	85	3.61
Ward 3 - Lakeshore
Hans Roach	1,404	55.49
Madelyn Steiss	1,126	44.51
Ward 4 - Northeast
Diane Freeman (X)	2,647	84.25
Maryssa Barras	300	9.55
Obinna Obi	195	6.21
Ward 5 - Southeast
Jen Vasic (X)	2,194	62.67
Joe Brenner	834	23.82
Blayr Hogg	306	8.74
Obie Oberholtzer	167	4.77
Ward 6 - Central-Columbia
Mary Lou Roe	896	32.21
Matthew Nicholas Schwarze	799	28.72
Jonathan Cassels	607	21.82
Karen Fischer	480	17.25
Ward 7 - Uptown
Julie Wright	3,041	80.64
Bruce Polan	730	19.36

== Wellesley ==
Joe Nowak was re-elected mayor by acclamation.

=== Mayor ===
Mayoral Candidate	Vote	%
Joe Nowak (X)	Acclaimed	

== Wilmot ==
The following were the results for mayor.

=== Mayor ===
Incumbent mayor Les Armstrong did not run for re-election. Councillor Jenn Pfenning ran to replace him.

Mayoral Candidate	Vote	%
Natasha Salonen	4,524	61.23
Jenn Pfenning	2,694	38.77

== Woolwich ==
The following were the results for mayor:

=== Mayor ===
Incumbent mayor Sandy Shantz ran for re-election. Councillor Pat Merlihan ran against her.

Mayoral Candidate	Vote	%
Sandy Shantz (X)	3,929	57.90
Patrick Merlihan	2,857	42.10
