= Hayley Elsaesser =

Canadian fashion designer

- Education: Queensland University of Technology
- Occupation: Fashion designer
- Website: www.hayleyelsaesser.com

Hayley Elsaesser is an Australian-educated fashion designer based in Hamilton, Ontario.

Elsaesser grew up in Cambridge, Ontario. She developed an interest in fashion shopping at second hand stores. She studied at the Queensland University of Technology, graduating in 2013. Her eponymous fashion line was launched the same year. Elsaesser opened a flagship store on Toronto's Queen Street West in 2015. She moved the business online in 2020 and relocated to Hamilton, Ontario.

Elsaesser has dressed celebrities including Katy Perry and Miley Cyrus. Her designs appeared in Tegan and Sara's video for the single U-Turn. In 2022 she partnered with Smirnoff to design the limited edition Very Berry Cool collection, using coolant material. She has previously worked with Nike, Coors and Taco Bell.
