= Jan Liggett =

Canadian politician

7th Mayor of Cambridge
- In office November 15, 2022 – October 26, 2026
- Preceded by: Kathryn McGarry
- Succeeded by: Scott Hamilton

Cambridge City Councillor
- In office December 1, 2014 – November 15, 2022
- Preceded by: Ben Tucci
- Succeeded by: Ross Earnshaw
- Constituency: Ward 4

Personal details
- Born: Janice Liggett
- Party: Independent
- Spouse: Les Kadar
- Occupation: Businesswoman

Janice Liggett is a Canadian politician. She served as 7th mayor of Cambridge from 2022 to 2026. As mayor, she also sat on Waterloo Regional Council.

== Early life ==
Liggett moved to Cambridge in the 1980s. She and her husband are co-owners of Garden Gate Ltd. and Benabec Architectural Precast, which makes concrete garden ornaments and architectural products. In 1991, she was one of the founders of the Ornamental Concrete Producers Association, of which she served one term as president. She also founded the Fallen Sparrows Fund, is the past president of Heritage Cambridge and served on the boards of the Grand River Film Festival and the Kiwanis Club of Cambridge.

== City council ==
Following unsuccessful runs in 2003, 2006 and 2010, Liggett was first elected to Cambridge City Council in the 2014 municipal elections, defeating Shawn Newton and Paul Brown in Ward 4, which covers the Galt part of the city. She ran on a platform of bringing a "respect for taxpayers' money and viewpoint to the job", highlighting an "infrastructure backlog", "environmental preservation" and the "value of small businesses in the community" as her priorities.

She was re-elected in 2018, defeating Gary Price and Edwin Friest.

While on council, Liggett sat on the Economic Development Advisory, Cambridge Arts Theatre and Core Areas Revitalization Advisory Committees, and part of the Water Billing Appeals Committee and the Post Office Steering Committee. She opposed the construction of an Amazon warehouse in Blair which is set to open in 2025. In 2019, she was found to be in violation of the city's code of conduct, following a dispute involving an administrative assistant who lodged a complaint against her in 2017.

== Mayor ==
Liggett ran for mayor of Cambridge in the 2022 mayoral election against incumbent mayor Kathryn McGarry. While on council, Liggett often found her self in opposition to McGarry on a number of controversial issues. In addition to her opposition of building an Amazon warehouse in Blair, Liggett also opposed the establishment of a consumption and treatment services site in the city, which McGarry supported. Her reasons for running for mayor included concerns that residents were being ignored, mental health, addiction and homelessness issues and "respect for taxpayers' money". In the election, Liggett defeated McGarry by just 1,126 votes. During the campaign, Liggett was hit by a car, breaking her foot in the process. In her first address to council as mayor, Liggett stated the city was in a "state of social recession", and needs to be "uplifted with an emphasis on city-building, saying the city must 'aim higher'." She indicated that the city needs "accessible rehabilitation for people who use drugs", "mental health facilities", and "mandatory court-ordered drug treatment".

As mayor, Liggett indicated she "does not expect" to use her new "strong mayor" powers, following the passing of the Strong Mayors, Building Homes Act by the provincial government. She has also had to face local concerns over a homeless encampment in the city. She has opposed the extension of Ion rapid transit, the region's light rail transit system to the city, favouring instead bus rapid transit, fearing light rail would bring problems to the downtown core, and the fact it would take a traffic lane away from Hespeler Road. During her term in office, the city celebrated its 50th anniversary since its amalgamation in 1973.

On October 26, 2026 Liggett was defeated in the mayoral election and succeeded by councillor Scott Hamilton.

=== Recreation centre controversy ===
Mayor Liggett presided over a heated meeting discussing gender neutral bathrooms in a new city facility. A public speaker said, "You offer the universal open area for males, females and children to change and shower together. Part of the process of grooming children is establishing a connection, isolating a child, testing boundaries — of all which councillors, you're providing opportunities". Liggett responded "that has nothing to do with this facility".

=== 2026 Pride month controversy ===
On June 1, 2026, teenager Sophie Mills was invited to speak at a Pride flag-raising event at Cambridge's city hall. During the event, they spoke out about Ward 6 councillor Adam Cooper's controversial Facebook post from January 2024, which included a meme which evoked concern and outrage from members of the 2SLGBTQ+ community. During the speech, Liggett interrupted Mills by stating, "Sophie, I'm not going to allow you to continue. This is disrespect." Bryan Causarano-Bolton, the co-founder of Grand River Pride, said about the situation: "The courage that it takes to get up in front of a whole bunch of people and share what Sophie was sharing, it was a super powerful speech that they were sharing. And to be censored like that, it’s just mind-boggling.”
