= Rob Leone =

Canadian politician

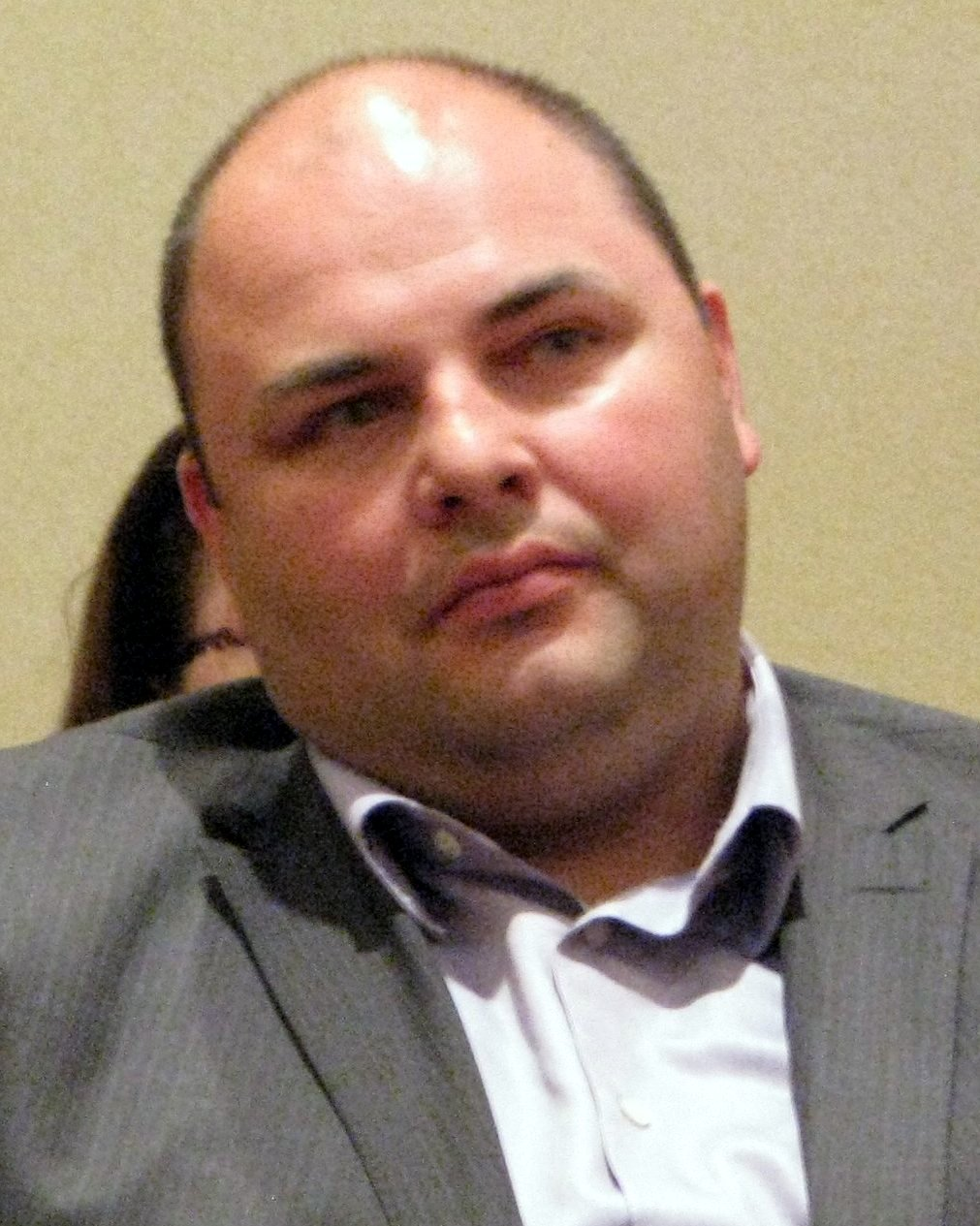

Ontario MPP
- In office 2011–2014
- Preceded by: Gerry Martiniuk
- Succeeded by: Kathryn McGarry
- Constituency: Cambridge

Personal details
- Party: Progressive Conservative
- Occupation: Professor

Roberto Leone is an academic and former politician in Ontario, Canada. He was a Progressive Conservative member of the Legislative Assembly of Ontario from 2011 to 2014, representing the riding of Cambridge.

== Background ==
Leone holds a Ph.D. in public policy from McMaster University. As of 2025, he is an associate professor at Niagara University in Lewiston, New York, having previously taught at University of Western Ontario in political science and Wilfrid Laurier University in leadership and journalism. Leone has been a contributor to The Hub since 2021.

== Politics ==
Leone ran in the 2011 provincial election as the Progressive Conservative candidate in the riding of Cambridge. He defeated Liberal candidate Kathryn McGarry by 1,954 votes. He faced McGarry again in 2014 and this time was defeated by McGarry by 3,069 votes.

During his time in the legislature, he was the PC party's critic for training and education issues.
