= Dave Jaworsky =

Canadian politician and former executive

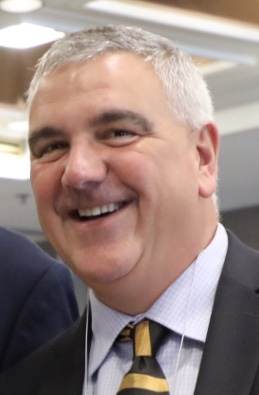
- Jaworsky in 2017

Mayor of Waterloo
- In office December 1, 2014 – November 15, 2022
- Preceded by: Brenda Halloran
- Succeeded by: Dorothy McCabe

Personal details
- Born: David Jaworsky; 1964 (age 61–62) Ontario, Canada
- Party: Independent
- Spouse: Jan Jaworsky (m. 1989)
- Children: 2
- Occupation: Politician; businessman

David Jaworsky (born 1964) is a Canadian politician and former BlackBerry executive. He served as the mayor of Waterloo from 2014 to 2022. As mayor, he also served on Waterloo Regional Council.

== Career ==
In 1988, Jaworsky received a bachelor's degree in mathematics from the University of Waterloo. In 2011, he graduated from the INSEAD International Executive Program. After graduating from Waterloo, Jaworsky stayed in the city, first working for IBM. He worked as the global leader of corporate social responsibility at BlackBerry, and served on the Boards of the Greater Kitchener-Waterloo Chamber of Commerce, Communitech and the Kitchener and Waterloo Community Foundation. He lost his job at BlackBerry in 2012 due to "corporate restructuring".

Jaworsky was elected as mayor of Waterloo in the 2014 municipal elections on a platform of "rebuild(ing) prosperity", "effective government" and promoting a "vibrant and caring community". He defeated his nearest rival, Erika Traub by over 6,000 votes.

Jaworsky was re-elected in the 2018 municipal elections defeating challenger Kelly Steiss by almost 12,000 votes. Jaworsky ran on a platform improving transportation for all users, and improving infrastructure.

In February 2022, Jaworsky announced he would not be seeking re-election as mayor in the 2022 municipal election. He listed "opening up a new adult complex, a new eastside library, a brand new gymnasium, a new walking track, (a rejuvenated) Waterloo Silver Lake", and a "bigger than ever" Lumin Festival as his accomplishments as mayor.
