= Kathryn McGarry =

6th mayor of Cambridge

The Honourable Kathryn McGarry ECO
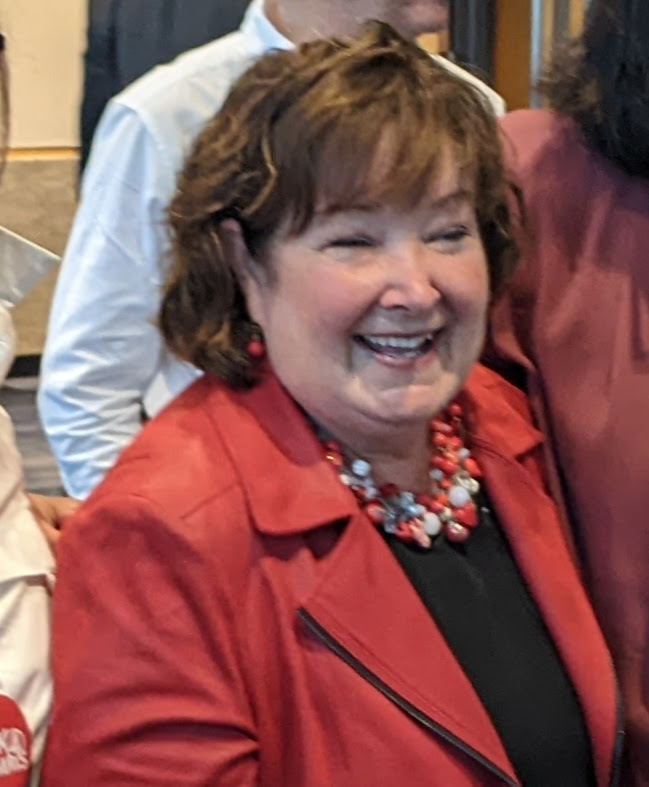

President of the Ontario Liberal Party
- Incumbent
- Assumed office March 5, 2023
- Preceded by: Brian Johns

6th Mayor of Cambridge
- In office December 1, 2018 – November 15, 2022
- Preceded by: Doug Craig
- Succeeded by: Jan Liggett

Minister of Transportation
- In office January 18, 2018 – June 7, 2018
- Premier: Kathleen Wynne
- Preceded by: Steven Del Duca
- Succeeded by: John Yakabuski

Member of the Ontario Provincial Parliament for Cambridge
- In office June 12, 2014 – June 7, 2018
- Preceded by: Rob Leone
- Succeeded by: Belinda Karahalios

Personal details
- Party: Ontario Liberal
- Other political affiliations: Independent
- Spouse: Fred McGarry
- Children: 4
- Profession: Politician; critical care nurse
- Website: Official website

Kathryn McGarry is a Canadian politician who has served as the president of the Ontario Liberal Party since 2023. Previously, she served the 6th mayor of Cambridge from 2018 to 2022. Prior to her election as mayor, she represented the riding of Cambridge in the Legislative Assembly of Ontario from 2014 to 2018. She was a minister in the Cabinet of Premier Kathleen Wynne. In 2023, McGarry was elected president of the Ontario Liberal Party.

== Background ==
McGarry began her career as a critical care nurse in 1978, working first at the Hospital for Sick Children, as well as Grand River Hospital and Cambridge Memorial hospital.

McGarry was a founding member of Hospice Waterloo Region; past president of the Heritage Cambridge Board of Directors; and past chair of the Heritage Master Plan Implementation Committee. She is a member of the Waterloo Region Crime Prevention Council, and was a contributing member of the Community Leaders' Task Force on Municipal Restructuring. McGarry has been a recipient of the YWCA Woman of Distinction Award for voluntary, community and humanitarian service, and the Bernice Adams Special Trustee award.

== Provincial politics ==
In the 2007 provincial election, McGarry vied as the Liberal candidate in the riding of Cambridge. She was defeated by Progressive Conservative incumbent Gerry Martiniuk by 3,238 votes. McGarry ran a second time in the 2011 provincial election but was defeated by a reduced margin of 1,954 votes to new PC candidate Rob Leone. McGarry ran a third time in 2014, this time defeating Leone by 3,067 votes.

On June 24, 2014, McGarry was named Parliamentary Assistant to the Minister of Transportation, and given responsibility for drafting the province's driverless car regulation, reforming the province's intercity bus system and strengthening cycling and road safety.

On November 20, 2014, McGarry introduced a private member's bill, The Lung Health Act 2014, which called for the development and implementation of a comprehensive Ontario Lung Health Action Plan covering research, prevention, diagnosis and treatment of lung disease.

On June 13, 2016, McGarry was appointed Minister of Natural Resources and Forestry. She introduced and passed legislation that increased accountability and oversight of Ontario’s 36 Conservation Authorities. She also introduced the Aggregate Resources and Mining Modernization Act, which modernized the province's resource extraction rules by updating processes for fee and royalty increases on aggregates, expanded public participation in the extraction application process and enhanced environmental protections through clearer regulations and better oversight for aggregate companies.

In a cabinet shuffle on January 18, 2018, McGarry was named Minister of Transportation. As Minister, McGarry announced the government would conduct a feasibility study to extend GO Transit rail service to Cambridge, connecting the city to the Kitchener line through Guelph via a currently unused CN Rail owned track.

McGarry lost her re-election bid in the 2018 provincial election to Belinda Karahalios.

In 2023, she announced that she would run for president of the Ontario Liberal Party. She was elected president at the party's annual general meeting in March 2023.

=== Cabinet positions ===
Wynne ministry, Province of Ontario (2013–2018)
Cabinet posts (2)
Predecessor	Office	Successor
Steven Del Duca	Minister of Transportation; 2018 (January–June)	John Yakabuski
Bill Mauro	Minister of Natural Resources and Forestry; 2016–2018	Nathalie Des Rosiers

== Municipal politics ==
On July 18, 2018, McGarry announced that she was running for Mayor of Cambridge, Ontario, stating that the people of the city were no longer satisfied with Craig's leadership style, and pledged to run city hall in a more communicative and consultative manner. During the campaign, Craig was forced to apologize to McGarry when his campaign staff edited her out of a photograph of a public event they had both attended while McGarry was still sitting in the Legislative Assembly. On October 22, 2018, McGarry was elected Mayor of Cambridge, defeating 18 year incumbent Doug Craig as well as three other candidates with 13,404 votes and 47.7% of the vote, becoming the first candidate in the city's history to defeat an incumbent mayor.

She was defeated by Jan Liggett in the 2022 municipal election.

== Election results ==
Cambridge mayoral election, 2018
Candidate	Votes	%
Kathryn McGarry	13,404	47.72
Doug Craig (X)	7,394	26.32
Ben Tucci	4,902	17.45
Colin Tucker	1,553	5.53
Randy Carter	836	2.98
Total	28,089	100.00
Source: City of Cambridge

2018 Ontario general election
Party	Candidate	Votes	%	±%
Progressive Conservative	Belinda Karahalios	17,793	36.97%	+4.41
New Democratic	Marjorie Knight	15,639	32.49%	+10.88
Liberal	Kathryn McGarry	11,191	23.25%	-15.67
Green	Michele Braniff	3,018	6.27%	+0.61
Libertarian	Allan Dettweiler	490	1.02%	-0.24
Total valid votes			100.0	
Progressive Conservative gain from Liberal		Swing		-
Source: Elections Ontario

2014 Ontario general election
Party	Candidate	Votes	%	±%
Liberal	Kathryn McGarry	18,763	38.92	+5.85
Progressive Conservative	Rob Leone	15,694	32.56	-5.13
New Democratic	Bobbi Stewart	10,413	21.59	-3.02
Green	Temara Brown	2,726	5.68	+3.18
Libertarian	Allan R. Dettweiler	605	1.25	-0.24
Total valid votes		48,200	100.00	
Total rejected, unmarked and declined ballots		814		
Turnout		49,015	49.04	
Eligible voters		100,130		
Liberal gain from Progressive Conservative		Swing		+5.85
Source: Elections Ontario

2011 Ontario general election
Party	Candidate	Votes	%	±%
Progressive Conservative	Rob Leone	15,947	37.69	-3.97
Liberal	Kathryn McGarry	13,993	33.07	-1.04
New Democratic	Atinuke Bankole	10,414	24.61	+10.81
Green	Jacques Malette	1,056	2.50	-6.43
Libertarian	Allan Dettweiler	629	1.49	
Independent	Robert Ross	271	0.64	
Total valid votes		42,310	100.00	
Total rejected, unmarked and declined ballots		187	0.44	
Turnout		42,497	46.04	
Eligible voters		92,310		
Progressive Conservative hold		Swing		-1.47
Source: Elections Ontario

2007 Ontario general election
Party	Candidate	Votes	%	±%
Progressive Conservative	Gerry Martiniuk	17,884	41.66	-0.84
Liberal	Kathryn McGarry	14,641	34.11	-1.08
New Democratic	Mitchell Healey	5,923	13.80	-4.29
Green	Colin Carmichael	3,835	8.93	+6.84
Family Coalition	Paul Vendervet	650	1.50	-0.63
Total valid votes		42,933	100.00	
Source: Elections Ontario
