= Brenda Halloran =

Mayor of Waterloo
- In office 2006–2014
- Preceded by: Herb Epp
- Succeeded by: Dave Jaworsky

Personal details
- Born: Hamilton, Ontario, Canada
- Spouse: Fred Brandenburg
- Relations: Michael and Jeff (brothers); Liz (daughter); James Halloran (father) and Doreen Halloran (mother)
- Education: Conestoga College (RN); Ryerson University; Conrad Grebel College
- Occupation: municipal politician
- Profession: registered nurse, advisor and mediator

Brenda Halloran is a former mayor of Waterloo, Ontario. She was first elected in the 2006 municipal election, defeating incumbent mayor Herb Epp and former mayor Brian Turnbull. She was re-elected in 2010.

== Personal ==
Halloran was born in Hamilton, Ontario to James 'Jim' (July 6, 1929 - April 21, 2005) and Doreen Halloran, as the first of three children. Her two younger brothers Michael and Jeffrey are an engineer and a small business owner respectively. The family settled in Waterloo in 1964, three years after the youngest son, Jeffrey, was born. Halloran graduated from Waterloo Collegiate Institute, then studied nursing at Conestoga College (RN 1976)

Prior to her election to the mayoralty, Halloran worked as a dispute resolution advisor and mediator for the Canada Revenue Agency from 1990 to 2006. Halloran returned to Waterloo in 1990 after living in Toronto and Florida during her earlier nursing career. Halloran also took courses at Ryerson University and obtained a certificate in conflict resolution from Conrad Grebel College.
