= Jane Brewer =

Canadian politician

Mayor of Cambridge, Ontario
- In office 1988–2000
- Preceded by: Claudette Millar
- Succeeded by: Doug Craig

Personal details
- Born: April 15, 1924
- Died: August 22, 2017 (aged 93)
- Resting place: Parklawn Cemetery; 43.4091500, -80.3733910

Jane Brewer (1924-2017) was a Canadian politician and a former mayor of the city of Cambridge, Ontario. Brewer was born April 15, 1924, to Jack and Clara Davison. Her political career began in 1978 when she was elected a ward alderman. She went on to serve as the mayor of Cambridge from 1988 to 2000. Her political career spanned 36 years during which time she also served as a Region of Waterloo councillor. In addition to political endeavors Brewer was an active member of the Lutheran Church, serving as the director of the Canadian section of the Lutheran Church of America and as vice-president of the Evangelical Lutheran Church in Canada's Eastern Synod.

Brewer retired in 2014 due to health issues. The same year she was awarded a lifetime achievement award by the Cambridge Chamber of Commerce. Brewer died August 22, 2017. She was buried at Parklawn Cemetery in Cambridge. In 2017 Ken Seiling, then Regional Chair of the Region of Waterloo, posthumously awarded Brewer the Jack Young Civic Award in recognition of her extensive involvement with regional politics.
