= Cambridge City Council (Ontario) =

Mayor–council government

Cambridge, Ontario City Council consists of the Mayor of Cambridge, Ontario, two regional councillors and 8 ward councillors.

== Councillors ==
As of the 2022 Waterloo Region municipal elections

- Mayor - Jan Liggett
- Regional councillor - Doug Craig
- Regional councillor - Pam Wolf
- Ward 1 - Helen Shwery (Blair, Preston Heights, Silver Heights) - elected in a by-election in Nov. 2023
- Ward 2 - Mike Devine (Hespeler)
- Ward 3 - Corey Kimpson (Preston)
- Ward 4 - Ross Earnshaw (Greenway-Chaplin, East Galt)
- Ward 5 - Sheri Roberts (Blair Road, Southwood)
- Ward 6 - Adam Cooper (Christopher-Champlain)
- Ward 7 - Scott Hamilton (Littles Corners, Allison)
- Ward 8 - Nicholas Ermeta (Fiddlesticks)
