= Doug Craig (politician) =

Canadian politician

5th Mayor of Cambridge, Ontario
- In office December 1, 2000 – November 30, 2018
- Preceded by: Jane Brewer
- Succeeded by: Kathryn McGarry

Personal details
- Born: 1946 (age 78–79)
- Profession: teacher

Doug Craig is a Canadian politician, who served as mayor of Cambridge, Ontario from 2000 to 2018. He was defeated in the 2018 municipal election, and was succeeded on December 1 by Kathryn McGarry.

== Background ==
A schoolteacher by profession, he first served on Cambridge, Ontario City Council as an alderman from 1976 to 1980, and then served on other municipal boards and committees before being reelected as a city and regional councillor in 1991. He was reelected to council in 1994 and 1997, before running for mayor in 2000 after Jane Brewer announced that she would run for a regional council seat rather than another term as mayor. He won the mayoral election, although his victory was subject to a judicial recount due to his margin of just 30 votes over second-place finisher Greg Durocher. The recount narrowed his margin to 26 votes, but confirmed his victory.

== Mayoralty ==
In his maiden speech at the first meeting of the new council, Craig noted that he supported a formal collaboration process between the municipal councils of Waterloo Region, but that he would not support the full amalgamation of Cambridge with Kitchener and Waterloo. In 2001, he supported the expansion of GO Transit service in Cambridge as an alternative to a controversial new highway construction proposal that would have disrupted the city's Cruickston Park.

Early in his term he scored a significant achievement for the city, successfully lobbying the University of Waterloo to establish its new School of Architecture campus in a vacant factory building in Cambridge. Around this time, Brewer and Fred Kent, the city's regional councillors, were facing some scrutiny for often voting differently at the Waterloo Region council level from the wishes of Cambridge's city council, but Craig earned himself a reputation as a "diplomat" for refusing to participate in the criticism of Brewer and Kent; instead, he took personal responsibility for a lack of communication between the city and regional councillors, caused by the provincial government's recent separation of the two roles.

Craig was reelected in the 2003 municipal election, winning 75 per cent of the vote over his sole challenger. During his second term, he was noted particularly for his work on improving the city's transportation network, as well as the city council's decision to build a significant expansion onto city hall.

Margaret Barr, Craig's main challenger in the 2006 municipal election, harshly criticized the new administration building as evidence that Craig was running city hall in a closed manner that was unresponsive to public opinion. Craig was successfully reelected, albeit by a significantly narrower margin than in 2003.

In his third term in office he advocated for Cambridge to be included in Waterloo Region's rapid transit plan, which had initially included only Kitchener and Waterloo, and supported a plan to replace many traffic lights on the city's Franklin Boulevard with roundabouts.

He was successfully reelected to a fourth term in 2010, and to a fifth term in 2014.

In the 2018 election campaign, McGarry, formerly the city's Member of Provincial Parliament, announced following her defeat in the 2018 provincial election that she would run for mayor. She alleged in her campaign that the people of the city were no longer satisfied with Craig's leadership style, and pledged to run city hall in a more communicative and consultative manner. During the campaign, Craig was forced to apologize to McGarry when his campaign staff edited her out of a photograph of a public event they had both attended while McGarry was still sitting in the Legislative Assembly. On election day, McGarry defeated Craig for the seat, and Craig became the first mayor in the city's history to be defeated in a re-election bid.

Craig returned to politics in 2022 when he was elected to Waterloo Regional Council.
