= Cambridge, Ontario =

City in Canada

Cambridge
- City (lower-tier)
- City of Cambridge
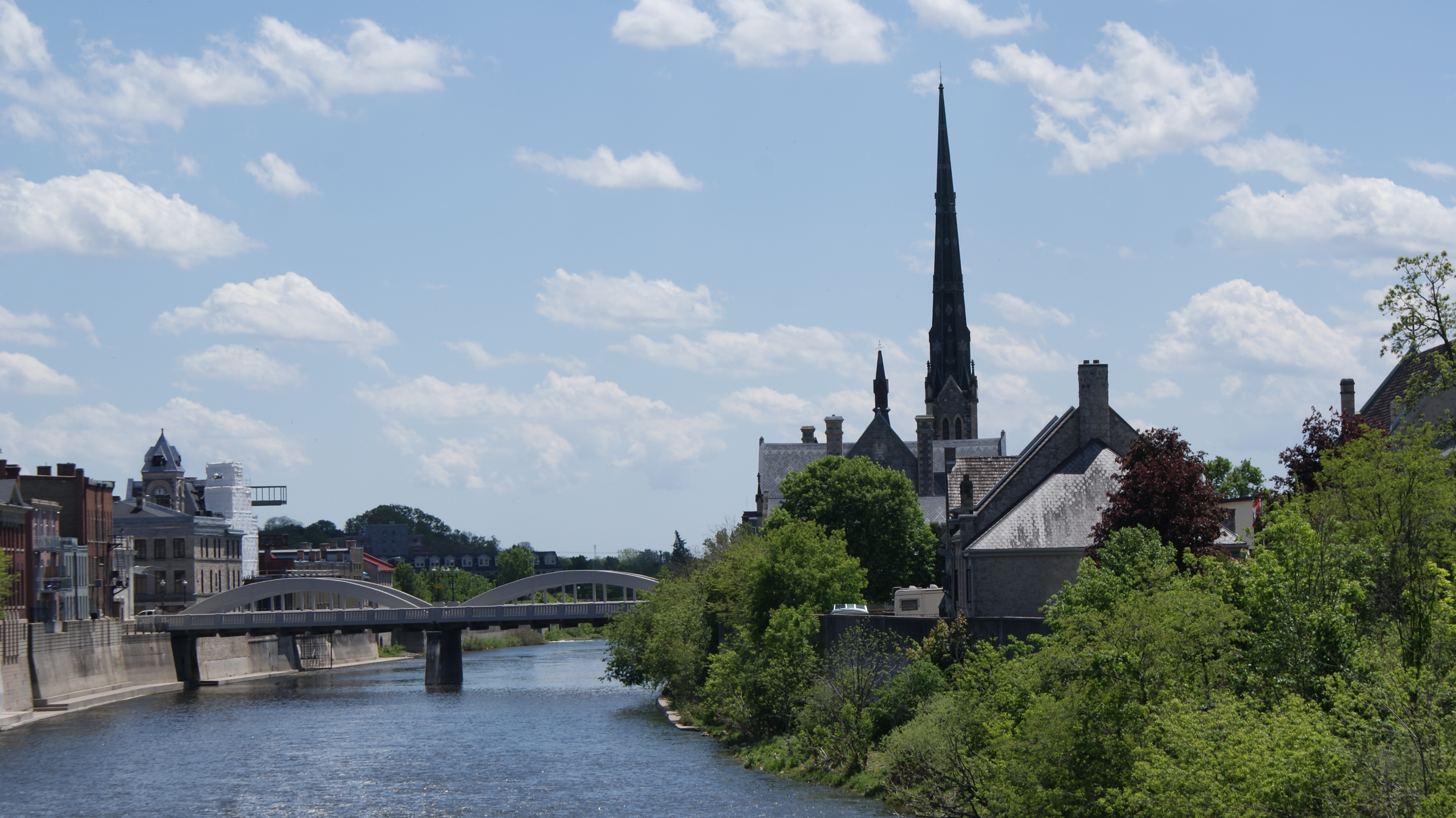
- Grand River scene facing downtown Cambridge (Galt)

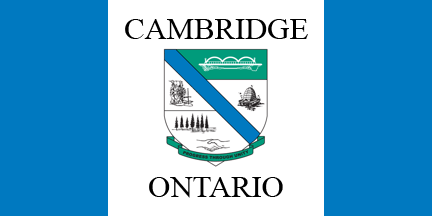
- Flag Seal Logo
- Nicknames: The Bridge, the Tri-City
- Motto: "A fine place for business, a great place to call home."
- Interactive map of Cambridge
- Location within Canada Location within Southern Ontario Location within Regional Municipality of Waterloo
- Coordinates: 43°21′36″N 80°18′45″W
- Country: Canada
- Province: Ontario
- Region: Waterloo
- Established: January 1973

Government
  - Mayor: Jan Liggett
  - Governing Body: Cambridge City Council
  - MP: Connie Cody (Conservative)
  - MPP: Brian Riddell (Progressive Conservative)

Area
  - Land: 112.99 km^{2} (43.63 sq mi)
- Elevation: 329 m (1,079 ft)

Population (2021)
  - City (lower-tier): 138,479 (41st)
  - Density: 1,225.5/km^{2} (3,174/sq mi)
  - Metro: 575,847 (10th)
- Time zone: UTC−5 (Eastern)
- Forward sortation area: N1P to N1T, N3C to N3E, N3H
- Area codes: 519, 226, and 548
- Highways: Highway 401; Highway 8 Highway 24
- GNBC Code: FANXK
- Website: cambridge.ca

Cambridge is a city in the Regional Municipality of Waterloo, Ontario, Canada, located at the confluence of the Grand and Speed rivers, in the central part of the Ontario Peninsula. The city had a population of 138,479 as of the 2021 census. Along with Kitchener and Waterloo, Cambridge is one of the three core cities of the Regional Municipality of Waterloo.

Cambridge was formed in 1973 by the amalgamation of Galt, Preston, Hespeler, and the settlement of Blair in North Dumfries, as well as east and west Galt. The former Galt covers the largest portion of Cambridge, making up the southern half of the city, while Preston and Blair cover the western side. Hespeler makes up the most northeastern section of Cambridge. Historical information and records of each entity are well documented in the Cambridge City Archives.

== History ==
The Cambridge area was inhabited by Indigenous peoples before the arrival of Europeans. The ruins of a longhouse village dated to between 1280 and 1360 CE was found near Myers Road in 1989. They may have practiced slash and burn agriculture (as was common in the Northeastern Woodlands since 1000 CE) cultivating the Three Sisters and could have been occupied by the Iroquoian speaking Chonnonton Peoples. In the late 17th century, the Algonkian speaking Anishinaabe and Mississauga peoples moved into the territory of Southern Ontario.

The area was granted to the Iroquois people by the British Crown at the end of the American Revolutionary War. William Dickson, a wealthy developer from Scotland, bought 90,000 acres (360 km^{2}) of land along the Grand River in 1816; this was later to become Galt and the Dumfries Townships. Dickson divided the land and sold smaller lots, particularly to Scottish settlers. The centre of the planned community was built at the junction of Mill Creek and the Grand River, then called Shade's Mills.. The German Company Tract, along the Speed River, was purchased earlier from the Six Nations Indians, and became Preston. The area that eventually came to be Hespeler was also on land measuring over 90,000 acres (360 km^{2}) similarly purchased in 1798 by Mennonites from Pennsylvania with the assistance of developer Richard Beasley.

Dickson decided to name the Post Office Galt, in honour of John Galt of the Canada Company which was developing this entire area.

=== History of the City of Galt ===
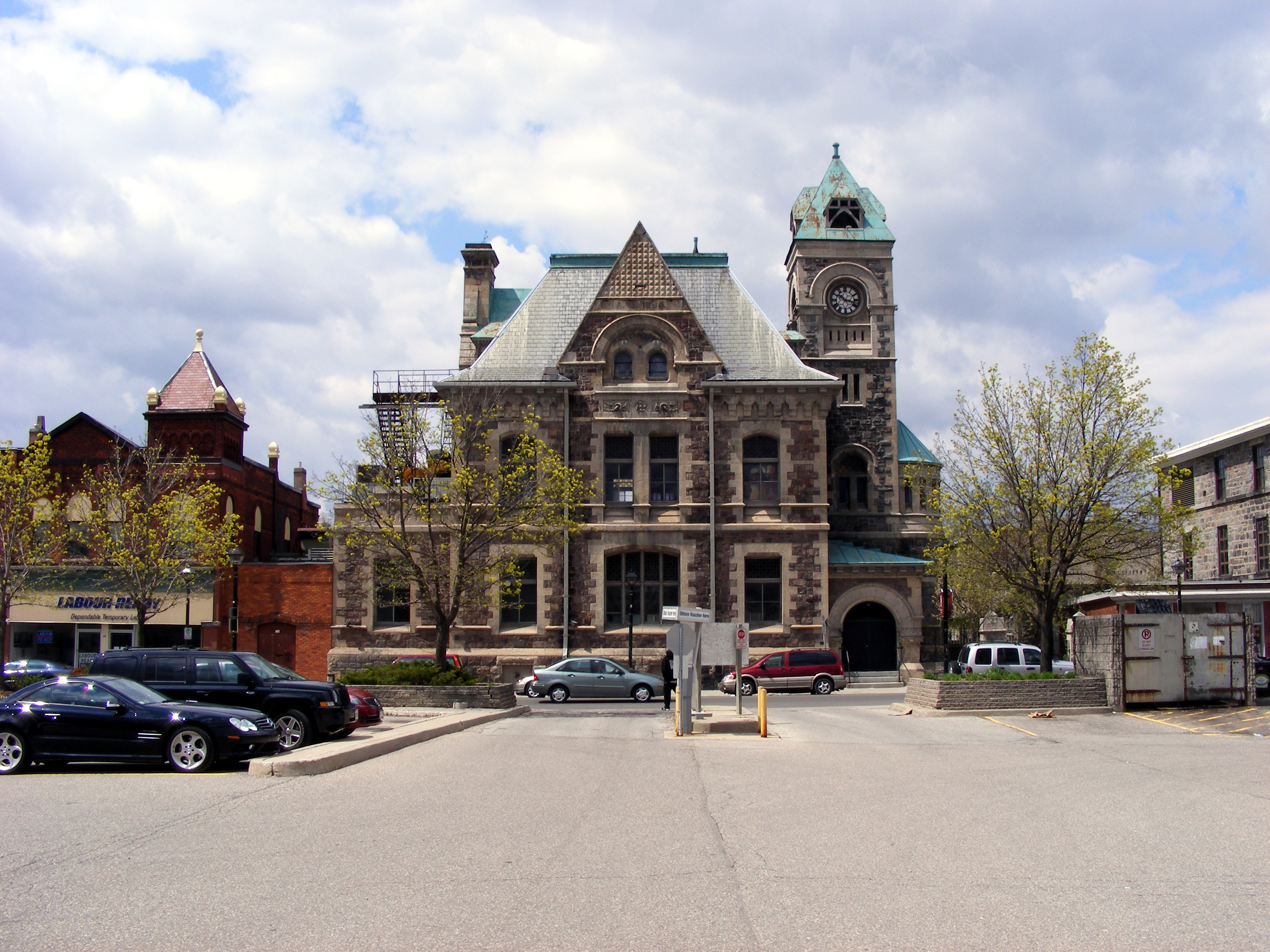
Old Post Office in Galt, built in 1886

Primarily agricultural in early years, Galt had attracted industry by 1840 and became the largest town in the Grand River area until the early 1900s. The town continued to grow, however, based on a large industrial base. In fact, Galt was called "Manchester of Canada" because of the extensive industry, powered by the Grand River. Some of the important businesses in about 1870 included the Dickson Mills (opened in 1843), the Axe Factory forge, two furniture factories, The Dumfries iron and brass foundry, three large woolen factories, a malt factory, the Victoria Steam Carriage Works, the Dumfries Flour Mill, the Victoria Foundry making farm implements, a large soap and candles works and two steam-powered tanneries.

Records from 1846 indicate that Galt had very valuable water-power that allowed for milling and manufacturing. Stone buildings in the downtown area had already been erected and the population was 1,000, most of whom were originally from Scotland. Amenities included a curling club, library, a weekly newspaper, a school, a bank (Gore) and a fire company. The post office was receiving daily mail. Industries included two grist mills, two saw mills, two foundries, two carding machines and cloth factories, one brewery, two distilleries, one tannery, eight stores, nine taverns, two grocery stores and various tradesmen.

The largest of the early schools in the community, the Galt Grammar School, opened in 1852 with the Dubliner William Tassie as headmaster starting in 1853 at the site of what later became the Galt Collegiate. The school gained widespread recognition and attracted students from across North America. By 1872, it had been recognized as a Collegiate Institute.

Galt was incorporated as a town on January 1, 1857, with Morris C. Lutz elected as the first mayor. By 1858, a "Town Hall and Market House" had been built with an "Italianate", particularly Tuscan, influence. In later years, the building became the City Hall and was extensively modified. Throughout that entire period, it continued to grow based on a large industrial base.

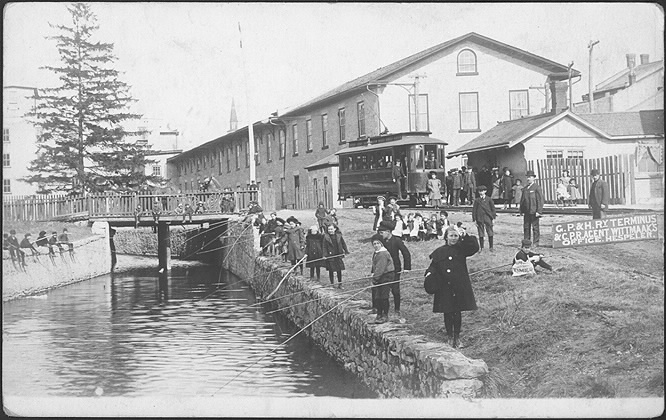
An interurban streetcar connected Hespeler to nearby Preston and Galt.

The railway reached Galt in 1879, increasing the opportunities of exporting local goods and importing others. The Credit Valley Railway planned to implement several lines running west and north from Toronto and in 1873, built freight and passenger buildings in Galt. By 1879, the company had installed a bridge crossing the river and in December completed a preliminary test run with a train; it was successful. The CVR venture was not long-lived, however, and in 1883, the line was taken over by the Canadian Pacific Railway, which built a brick passenger building that still stands.

The first hospital in Waterloo County opened in 1890 as Galt General Hospital. Additional buildings and facilities were added in the early 1900s. By 1918, the facility had an X-ray room, a 27-room nurses' residence, and also served as a nurses' training school.

A new streetcar system, the Galt, Preston and Hespeler electric railway, (later called the Grand River Railway Company) also began to operate in 1894, connecting Preston and Galt. In 1911, the line reached Hespeler, Berlin (later called Kitchener) and Waterloo; by 1916 it had been extended to Brantford/Port Dover. The electric rail system ended passenger services in April 1955.

Galt was incorporated as a city in 1915 and continued to grow due to a large industrial base.

In 1911, most of the population of Galt were Protestant: 4,240 Presbyterians, 1,930 Anglicans, and 2,122 Methodists. There were very few Roman Catholics.

The Dickson Hill Heritage Conservation District, located in West Galt, is composed of stately homes from the late 19th and early 20th centuries.

=== History of the Town of Preston ===
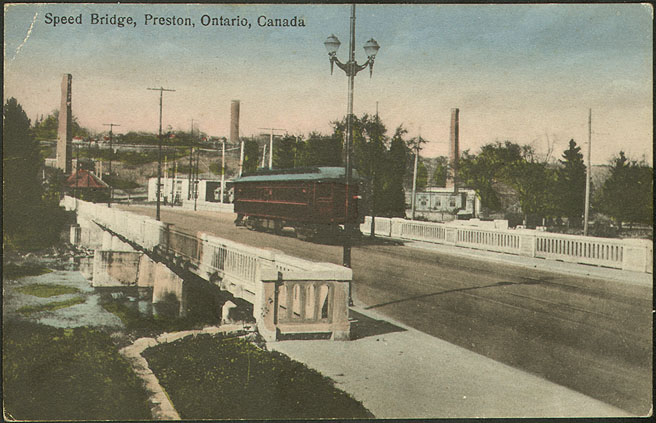
An interurban streetcar connected Preston to neighbouring towns.

In the 1800s a group of German-speaking Mennonites from Pennsylvania arrived in the area and purchased land. Among the first settlers to arrive in what was later to become Preston was John Erb, a Mennonite from Lancaster County, who arrived in 1805. He bought 7,500 acres (30 km^{2}) including land at the confluence of the Grand and Speed Rivers in what later became Preston, and later built a sawmill in 1806 and a gristmill in 1807. This settlement became known as Cambridge Mills.

Even in the early 1800s, the area included homes, a store, an inn, small shops operated by artisans and craftsmen, mostly immigrants from Germany. The Erb sons had hired William Scollick for their development business and the latter completed a full survey in 1834; he also convinced the Erbs to rename the Cambridge Mills area Preston. After Erb's death in 1832, a son sold off property on both sides of the Speed River. What eventually became Preston started as a large settlement on the north side.

There were only 250 inhabitants in 1836, many from Pennsylvania, but the population had reached about 1600 by 1855, with some 70% originally from Germany. By then, the area had eight hotels and taverns.

The Canadian Gazetteer of 1846 indicates a population of about 600 inhabitants, two churches, a post office that receives mail each day, a steam grist mill, and tradesmen of various types. At the time, there was no significant industry.

The Preston post office opened in 1837 and the population continued to grow primarily because of immigration from Germany. Preston was incorporated as a village in 1853. The population declined in the late 1800s but by 1900, it had increased to 2,000 partly because of the new electric railway systems that started in 1894. In 1911, the line reached Hespeler, Berlin (later called Kitchener) and Waterloo; by 1916 it had been extended to Brantford/Port Dover. This made visiting other communities and carrying of goods very convenient.

Due to continued growth, by 1879 there were many industries such as a foundry, carriage manufacturer, potteries and a furniture company. This was also the year that the Cherry Flour Mills started, which would later become the Dover Flour Mills, a Preston company that still operates today.

By 1888, the Preston Springs Hotel, then called the Del Monte Hotel, was operating. Demolition of the building began in December 2020 for reasons of public safety.

On September 30, 1899, Preston was incorporated as a town with a population of just under 11,000. The Great Road between Dundas and Berlin (Kitchener) as well as the railroad connections helped the community to continue growing into an important industrial centre. Products made here included flour, agricultural implements, furniture, stoves, shoes and textiles. Preston grew and continued to be a successful industrial area; expansion followed in the 1950s and 1960s.

While most of the population of what became Waterloo County, Ontario was Protestant in 1911, Preston had a larger share of Roman Catholics, 844, while 862 were Lutherans, 707 Methodists, 704 Anglicans, and 525 Presbyterians.

=== History of the Town of Hespeler ===
The first settler, in 1809, was Abraham Clemens who had bought 515 acres (2.1 km^{2}) of land from Mr. Beasley on the Speed River. In 1810, Cornelius Pannabecker arrived and set up a blacksmithy a year or two later. Twenty years later, Joseph Oberholtzer purchased a much larger area of land that would become the early Hespeler. It was named Bergeytown in honour of his brother-in-law and the name became New Hope in about 1835.

Settler Jacob Hespeler arrived in 1845 and bought a 145 acres (0.59 km^{2}) tract on the Speed River. He built an industrial complex that was the beginning of Hespeler's future industrialization which would consist primarily of woollen and textile mills. Records from 1846 indicate a population of only 100 inhabitants, a grist and a saw mill, a tannery, a tavern, one store, one pail factory, two blacksmiths, two tailors, two shoemakers.

In 1858, Jacob Hespeler opened the Post Office and the settlement, previously called New Hope, was incorporated as the village of Hespeler.

The arrival of the railway in 1859 helped businesses to develop and prosper. By 1864, there was a large flour mill, cloth and wool manufacturing plants, a sawmill and a distillery all built of cut stone. There was also a large furniture factory and four churches.

Continued growth allowed Hespeler to be incorporated as a town in January 1901. Over the following years, the community continued growing slowly. By 1911 the electric railway system between Preston and Galt had reached Hespeler as well as Berlin (later called Kitchener) and Waterloo; by 1916 it had been extended to Brantford/Port Dover.

Textile production mills were the primary industry in the early 1900s and continued to be successful until the late 1940s, when this industry began to decline. Other industries continued to boom and by 1969, Hespeler's population was 6,000.

=== History of the Village of Blair ===
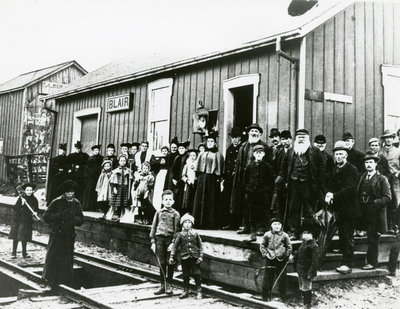
Crowd gathered in front of the Blair Grand Trunk Railway station in 1898

The land (west of what is now Preston), including Carolinian forest, that would eventually become Blair was purchased from the Six Nations, through land speculator Richard Beasley. It was settled in 1800 by Samuel D. Betzner, one of the Mennonites from Pennsylvania. The group later discovered that Beasley had gotten into financial trouble and that a lien was placed on the lands. To solve the problem, the group created the German Company that bought an additional 60,000 acres of land from Beasley, who used the proceeds to pay off the debt on the previous lands. This ensured a clear title for the Mennonite group.

The first school in what later became Waterloo County opened in 1802 near Blair, then known as Shinglebridge. The first teacher's name was Mr. Rittenhaus.

By 1804, the first cemetery in Waterloo County had been founded. Also located in Blair, it is often referred to as the Old Blair Cemetery or the Old Blair Memorial Cemetery. The first recorded burial was of an infant, the son of Mennonite settler John Bricker, who died on March 10 of that year.

Joseph Bowman, a man called Wismer and John Bechtel were responsible for the early development of the community in an area laid out by Benjamin B. Bowman. They built a dam, then a sawmill and grist mill. In 1846, a large flour mill opened, which was called the Bowman Mill, Blair Mill and also the Carlisle Mill. In about 1876, a 15-horsepower hydroelectric system, the Sheave Tower, was built on Bowman Creek by Allan Bowman to help power the flour mill using a series of shafts and gears. This was a significant achievement in that era.

Although the name Carlisle (or New Carlisle) was commonly used then, the name Blair was chosen for the first post office in 1858 because a village of Carlisle had already been established in Halton County. The new name honoured Adam Johnston Fergusson Blair, the first judge of Wellington District and a militia colonel in the area. In addition to Carlisle, earlier names for the village had included Shinglebridge, because a bridge with a shingle roof crossed the Grand River in this area from 1853 to 1857. It was also called Durham (or Durhamville) and Lambs' Bridge.

By 1864, the settlement was receiving mail daily, had a large school, a Mennonite meeting house, a large brick church and a population of 200. Railway service arrived in Blair in 1873 when the Grand Trunk Railway, having acquired the Great Western Railway's defunct Preston and Berlin Railway, rerouted it through Blair on its way to Galt, bypassing Preston, the railway's original destination.

Blair became part of Preston in 1969. Many historic buildings still stand in the village, including some from the early 1820s. This includes the Sheave Tower (restored in 1999) and the John Bechtel residence.

=== History since Amalgamation ===
In May 1974, flooding on the Grand River filled city streets with water to a depth of about 4 feet (1.2 m). In some areas of the downtown core, the depth was 17.4 feet (5.3 m), smashing windows and carrying goods along the streets. Approximately 75 businesses were affected, with virtually none covered by relevant insurance. The flood caused an estimated $5 million in damage.

=== Galt, Preston and Hespeler Electric Railway ===
A new electric street railway system, the Galt, Preston and Hespeler Street Railway (later called the Grand River Railway Company) began to operate in 1894, initially connecting Preston and Galt. In 1911, the line reached Hespeler, Berlin (later called Kitchener) and Waterloo; by 1916 it had been extended to Brantford/Port Dover. The electric rail system ended passenger services in April 1955.

== Government ==
The first mayor of Cambridge, taking office as of the city's creation in 1973, was Claudette Millar. Most recently, Kathryn McGarry was elected in the 2018 municipal election to succeed Doug Craig as the city's sixth mayor, taking office on December 1, 2018.

Cambridge City Council consists of the mayor and eight councillors, each representing a ward.

A referendum question asking municipal electors if they wished to change to ranked voting was approved on October 23, 2018.

In 2020, Scott Hamilton was elected in a by-election for Ward 7 to replace Councillor Frank Monteiro who passed while serving the community.

City councillors by ward:

- Ward 1: Helen Shwery
- Ward 2: Mike Devine
- Ward 3: Corey Kimpson
- Ward 4: Ross Earnshaw
- Ward 5: Sheri Roberts
- Ward 6: Adam Cooper
- Ward 7: Scott Hamilton
- Ward 8: Nicholas Ermeta

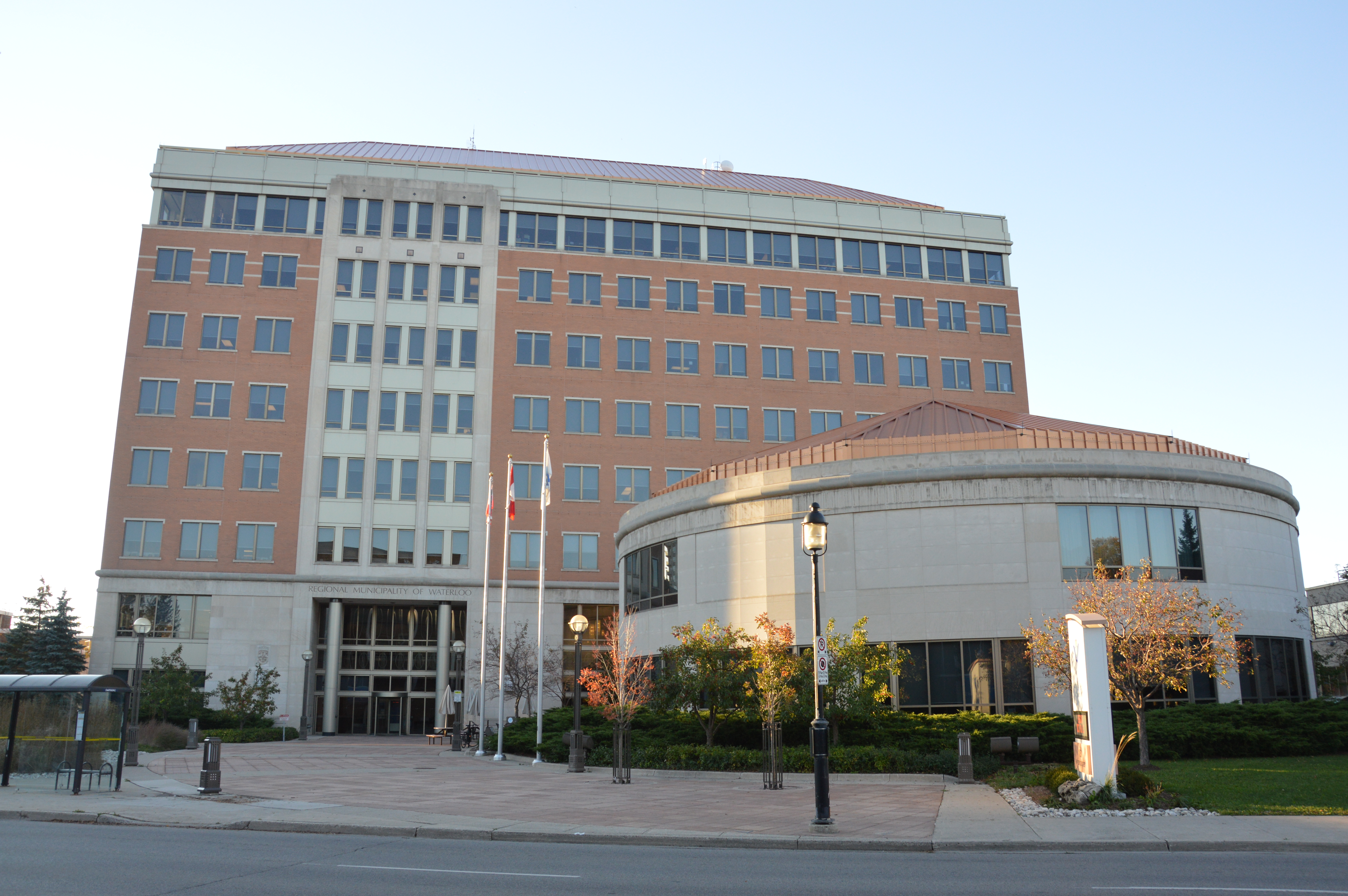
Region of Waterloo Headquarters in Kitchener

Cambridge is also represented on the higher-tier Waterloo Regional Council which consists of the regional chair, the mayors of the seven cities and townships, and eight additional councillors – four from Kitchener and two each from Cambridge and Waterloo.

The City of Cambridge is represented by:

- Cambridge Mayor Jan Ligget
- Regional Councillor Doug Craig
- Regional Councillor Pam Wolf

Cambridge federal election results
Year	Liberal		Conservative		New Democratic		Green	
2021	38%	23,522	34%	20,820	17%	10,529	3%	1,979
2019	40%	25,995	30%	19,757	19%	12,220	8%	5,242

Cambridge provincial election results
Year	PC		New Democratic		Liberal		Green	
2022	37%	16,048	23%	9,978	20%	8,651	9%	4,042
2018	37%	20,119	33%	17,830	22%	11,564	7%	3,623

Cambridge (federal electoral district) is represented in Ottawa by Connie Cody (Conservative), the federal member of Parliament who defeated the previous incumbent MP (Bryan May, Liberal – 2015 to 2025) in the April 2025 federal election. The second federal representative for Cambridge is Matt Strauss (Conservative), who represents the federal riding of Kitchener South—Hespeler.

The MPP for the provincial district of Cambridge is Brian Riddell (Progressive Conservative Party of Ontario), who defeated New Blue Party of Ontario co-founder Belinda Karahalios in 2022. The second provincial representative for Cambridge is Jess Dixon (Progressive Conservative), who represents the provincial riding of Kitchener South—Hespeler.

== Municipal services ==
The city is responsible for Community Services, Economic Development, Transportation & Public Works, Corporate Services, Fire Department and Planning Services. Many municipal services are provided through the Regional Municipality of Waterloo (often referred to as Waterloo Region or the Region of Waterloo), which consists of the cities of Cambridge, Kitchener, and Waterloo, and the townships of Woolwich, Wilmot, Wellesley, and North Dumfries. The region of Waterloo responsibilities includes Social Services, Community Health Services, Grand River Transit and Community Policing through Waterloo Regional Police Service.

=== Hospital ===
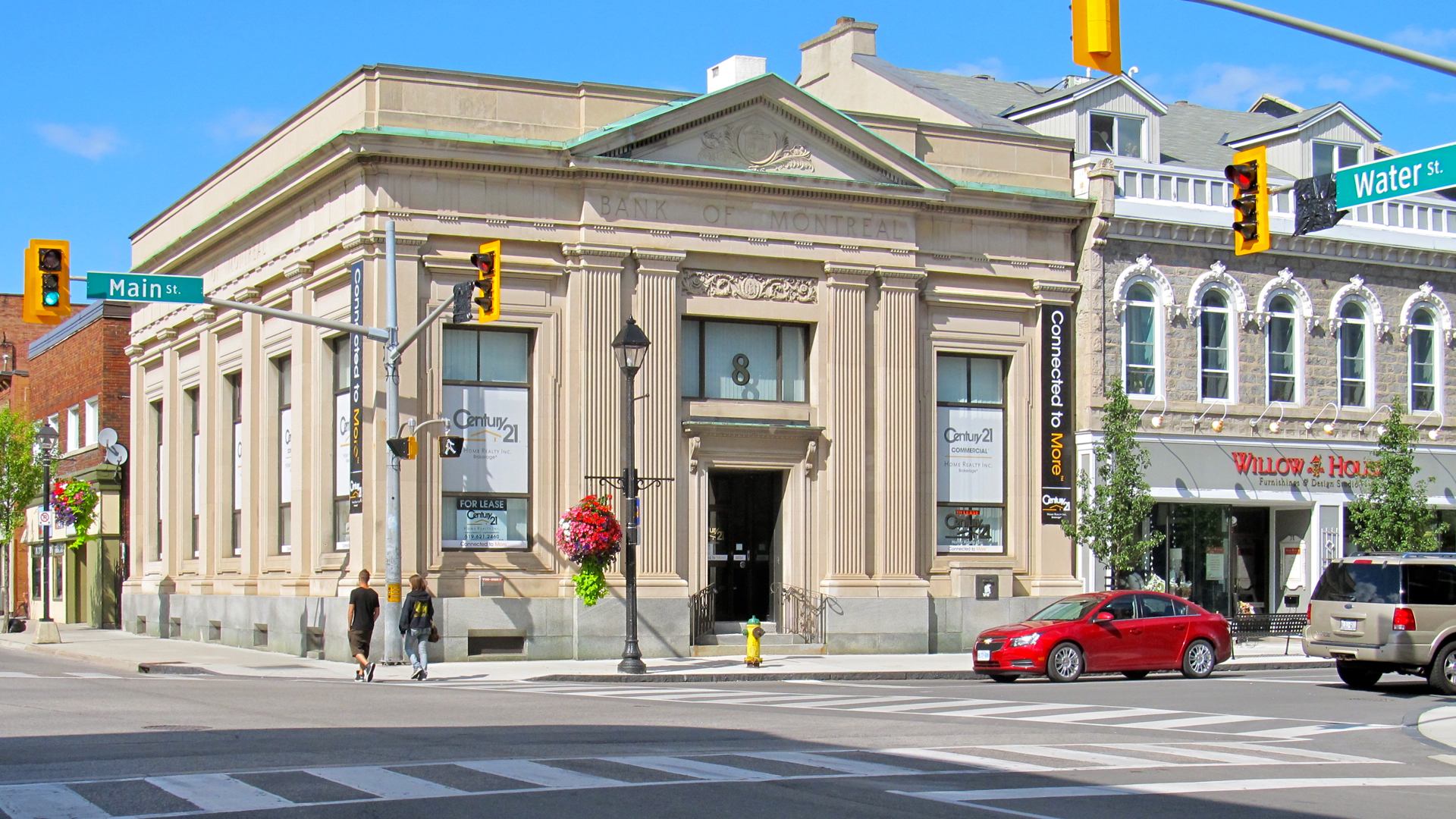
Old Bank of Montreal building in Downtown Cambridge

Cambridge Memorial Hospital opened in 1890, the first in Waterloo County, In 2026, the facility had 217 beds, an emergency department, ICU, and operating rooms.

== Climate ==
The climate in Cambridge is typical of southwestern Ontario, and has a humid continental climate under the Köppen climate classification (Köppen Dfb) with mostly moderate winters but the occasional deep freeze. In summer, the temperatures tend to be in the high twenties on the Celsius scale, and like most of southern Ontario, there can be stretches of high humidity creating some discomfort. On most days, Cambridge tends to be slightly warmer than Kitchener and Guelph, just to the north.

The last frost date of the season is around May 11, though most gardeners plant on the May 24 long weekend to be safe. Environment Canada issues frost warnings for the area from October 30 through to May 9.

Climate data for Cambridge, Ontario (1981–2010)
Month	Jan	Feb	Mar	Apr	May	Jun	Jul	Aug	Sep	Oct	Nov	Dec	Year
Record high °C (°F)	17.8 (64.0)	14.4 (57.9)	24.0 (75.2)	30.0 (86.0)	35.0 (95.0)	36.0 (96.8)	37.8 (100.0)	37.8 (100.0)	37.2 (99.0)	32.2 (90.0)	25.0 (77.0)	19.5 (67.1)	37.8 (100.0)
Mean daily maximum °C (°F)	−1.7 (28.9)	−0.8 (30.6)	4.2 (39.6)	12.3 (54.1)	19.0 (66.2)	23.9 (75.0)	26.7 (80.1)	25.1 (77.2)	20.3 (68.5)	13.7 (56.7)	6.8 (44.2)	0.6 (33.1)	12.5 (54.5)
Daily mean °C (°F)	−6 (21)	−5.5 (22.1)	−0.9 (30.4)	6.8 (44.2)	12.8 (55.0)	17.6 (63.7)	20.6 (69.1)	19.4 (66.9)	14.6 (58.3)	8.4 (47.1)	2.8 (37.0)	−3.2 (26.2)	7.3 (45.1)
Mean daily minimum °C (°F)	−10.2 (13.6)	−10.1 (13.8)	−6.0 (21.2)	1.2 (34.2)	6.6 (43.9)	11.3 (52.3)	14.4 (57.9)	13.5 (56.3)	8.9 (48.0)	3.0 (37.4)	−1.1 (30.0)	−7.1 (19.2)	2.1 (35.8)
Record low °C (°F)	−35.6 (−32.1)	−31.7 (−25.1)	−30.0 (−22.0)	−15.6 (3.9)	−5.0 (23.0)	−0.6 (30.9)	4.4 (39.9)	1.0 (33.8)	−3.9 (25.0)	−10.0 (14.0)	−20.0 (−4.0)	−28.5 (−19.3)	−35.6 (−32.1)
Average precipitation mm (inches)	55.4 (2.18)	47.4 (1.87)	50.2 (1.98)	71.3 (2.81)	84.2 (3.31)	74.1 (2.92)	111.6 (4.39)	91.5 (3.60)	86.9 (3.42)	71.9 (2.83)	86.8 (3.42)	74.0 (2.91)	905.2 (35.64)
Average rainfall mm (inches)	18.1 (0.71)	18.1 (0.71)	35.4 (1.39)	68.9 (2.71)	84.2 (3.31)	74.1 (2.92)	111.6 (4.39)	91.5 (3.60)	86.9 (3.42)	71.0 (2.80)	81.3 (3.20)	44.3 (1.74)	785.4 (30.92)
Average snowfall cm (inches)	37.8 (14.9)	29.3 (11.5)	14.8 (5.8)	2.4 (0.9)	0.0 (0.0)	0.0 (0.0)	0.0 (0.0)	0.0 (0.0)	0.0 (0.0)	0.91 (0.36)	7.3 (2.9)	29.7 (11.7)	122.2 (48.1)
Average precipitation days (≥ 0.2 mm)	11.7	8.9	9.6	12.9	12.0	9.2	10.1	10.2	11.9	12.7	12.7	12.2	133.8
Average rainy days (≥ 0.2 mm)	3.2	2.3	5.9	12.0	12.0	9.2	10.1	10.2	11.9	12.6	11.5	6.2	106.8
Average snowy days (≥ 0.2 cm)	9.2	7.0	3.8	1.1	0.0	0.0	0.0	0.0	0.0	0.23	1.9	6.2	29.3
Source: Environment Canada

== Economy ==
In 1988, Toyota Motor Manufacturing Canada opened a plant in Cambridge, which employs approximately 4,500 people and is the city's largest employer. Several other industrial companies also have locations in Cambridge, including Rimowa, Gerdau, ATS Automation Tooling Systems, Loblaw Companies Limited, Dare Foods, Frito-Lay Canada (formerly Hostess), Babcock & Wilcox, Rockwell Automation and COM DEV International in addition to service companies such as Coronation Dental Specialty Group.

The city encourages the filming of movie and TV productions and many have done location work here. Filmmakers come to the city for the European architecture and proximity to Toronto. Cambridge has become more "film-friendly" and has an increase in filmmakers coming to the city, with 15 projects filmed in 21 days in 2016. According to an interview with the Cambridge Record, Devon Hogue, economic development officer with the City of Cambridge noted what draws filmmakers: "First and foremost, they come for the river... Once they are here, they fall in love with the built architecture. That's not something you can get very easily in Toronto or Hamilton." In 2016, filming in Cambridge contributed $1.2 million to the economy and Hogue states that: "Seeing Cambridge on the screen creates a sense of community pride." Notable films shot in Cambridge include John Q (2002), Red (2010), Silent Hill: Revelation (2012) and Flatliners (2017). Notable television series filmed in Cambridge include Murdoch Mysteries (2008–), Between (2015–2016), Bitten (2014–2016), 11.22.63 (2016), The Handmaid's Tale (2017–), Designated Survivor (2016–), V-Wars (2019–), The October Faction (2019–) and American Gods (2017–). In 2019, Cambridge was nominated for "Outstanding Film Office" by the Location Manager's Guild International for their work on The Handmaid's Tale. This was the first time in the history of the award that a Canadian office was nominated.

== Education ==
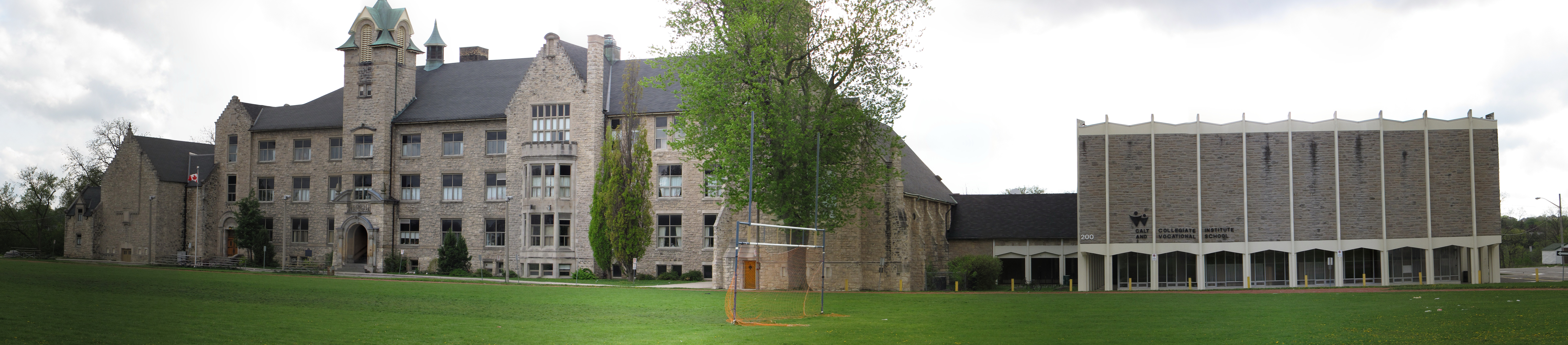
Galt Collegiate Institute is one of the oldest public high schools in Ontario.

English-language public schooling is provided by the Waterloo Region District School Board, which operates 26 elementary and five secondary schools in Cambridge. Public high schools in the city include the 165-year-old Galt Collegiate Institute and Vocational School; Preston High School, Glenview Park Secondary School; Southwood Secondary School; and Jacob Hespeler Secondary School.

Publicly funded Catholic education is available through schools operated by the Waterloo Catholic District School Board. The WCDSB runs 15 elementary and two secondary schools in the city: St. Benedict Catholic Secondary School & Monsignor Doyle Catholic Secondary School. Cambridge is also home to École secondaire Père-René-de-Galinée, the only French-language Catholic high school in the region. There are also a number of private elementary and secondary schools in the area.

The University of Waterloo School of Architecture campus is located in Cambridge in the Riverside Silk Mill, also known as the Tiger Brand Building. Inside there is a theatre, a fitness room, and the gallery "Design at Riverside", which is one of two publicly funded galleries dedicated to architecture in Canada. The School of Architecture is home to 380 students who live, study, and learn within the Cambridge community.

In 2009, Conestoga College Institute of Technology and Advanced Learning set up a new School of Engineering Technology specializing in advanced technology programs related to Robotics, Process Automation, Electronics, Communications, Engineering, and Information Technology. With over 200,000 square feet (19,000 m^{2}) of applied learning and research space.

An announcement in mid-December 2019 indicated that Conestoga College had decided to purchase 42 acres of land in this city with the intention of relocating all of the trades and apprenticeship programs (offered at various other campuses) to Cambridge at a future date. Specifics were not immediately provided.

== Attractions ==
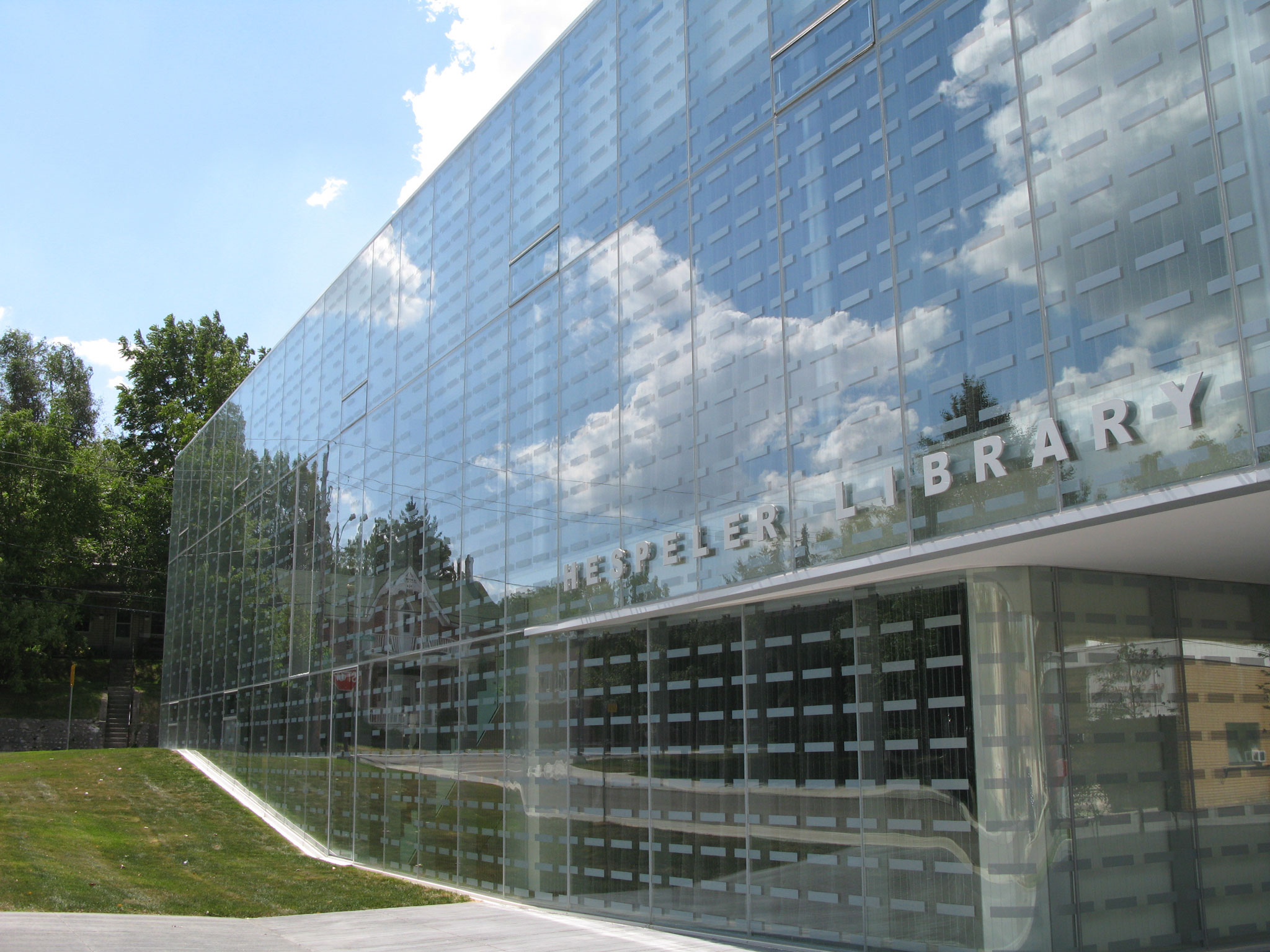
The new Hespeler Library was created by building a glass cube around the historic Carnegie library. The environmentally responsible building features recycled white oak floors and a ceramic treatment on the glass to reduce sunlight intensity.

Cambridge is home to many cultural events and activities, including the Mill Race Festival and the Rock the Mill music festivals in downtown Galt, and the Cambridge Highland Games in Churchill Park in July. There is also the Cambridge Butterfly Conservatory, the annual dragon boat festival, the Cambridge fall fair, and the Santa Claus Parade.

There is also the festive "Christmas in Cambridge" winter festival at Christmas featuring events like Unsilent Night, which began in New York City by Phil Kline. The City of Cambridge's take on this event uniquely involves other aspects of the community such as Christie digital projection technology. University of Waterloo School of Architecture Cambridge students in Dr. Jeff Lederer's Urban Revitalization and Design class designed the spectacular light installations.

The Cambridge Farmers' Market has been in operation in the original building on the original site circa 1830; making it the third-oldest market in the country. The Cambridge Farmers' Market is now ranked as one of the top 10 markets in the country by Best Health Magazine. All the vendors come from within a 100 km radius to sell fresh fruits, cheese, vegetables, baked goods and more.

The Cambridge Centre of the Arts is a municipally operated community arts centre that is available to area residents, artists and organizations. The Arts Centre was opened in May 2001. Cambridge Galleries are a part of the Cambridge Public Library system or Idea Exchange, with art exhibition spaces at Queen's Square, Preston and the new Design at Riverside location. Together, the three galleries host approximately 23 exhibitions per year. Along with the art gallery projects, Cambridge Libraries (Idea Exchange) are undergoing a $13.5 million restoration project of a former post-office into a digital library. The building was unused for some time before the city bought it for $950,000 and a Parks Canada grant of $800,000 restored some of the building. The new project will not house physical print but focus on 3D & laser printers, maker labs, performance and studio for teen, a large children's area including a Lego wall and a coffee shop.

The Federal and Ontario governments and the City of Cambridge came together and built the Dunfield Theatre in 2013 in an effort to promote Canadian talent and the performing arts. The 59,000-square-foot arts complex boasts 500 seats and over $20 million was contributed/donated. Michael Chan Minister of Tourism, Culture, and Sport said of the theatre's construction:"Arts and culture help to stimulate the economy, draw visitors to our province and enhance our quality of life...The new Dunfield Theatre Cambridge will enrich the cultural fabric of this community and provide exciting opportunities for people to engage in the arts. The Ontario government is pleased to support such a worthy project." In 2018, the theatre's name was changed to the Hamilton Family Theatre.

In June 2008, the new Cambridge City Hall facility opened as the first city hall in Canada to achieve the ranking of gold in the LEED from the Canada Green Building Council. The $30 million project was completed on time and on budget and financed through a settlement of a loan with the city's hydro utility. A conservative estimate comparing a standard 85,000-square-foot (7,900 m^{2}) building to the new City Hall LEED-standard building results in a $160,000 savings on energy per year or some $1.6 million over 10 years. The open concept of the facility allows for greater airflow, reducing cooling costs and increasing the penetration of natural light to offset other light sources. A four-story "living wall" of tropical plants is located in the atrium and cleanses the air of pollutants such as formaldehyde, volatile organic compounds, dust, and spores. Behind the living wall is a running water supply that provides humidity during the winter months and a soothing sound for employees and visitors to enjoy all year round.

The historic city hall in Cambridge was built in 1858 by local architect H.B. Sinclair for $3,650, replacing the original structure built in 1838. Built of granite and white limestone, locally found blue granite was used as a decorative feature. The Historic City Hall served as the community's town hall and marketplace. Today, the Historic City Hall and the New City Hall are connected by a hallway constructed shortly after the New City Hall was built.

In the tradition of environmental stewardship, Cambridge preserves over 365 hectares (900 acres) of parkland which make up more than 80 parks in the city, as well as over 140 kilometres (87 mi) of on-road cycling lanes.

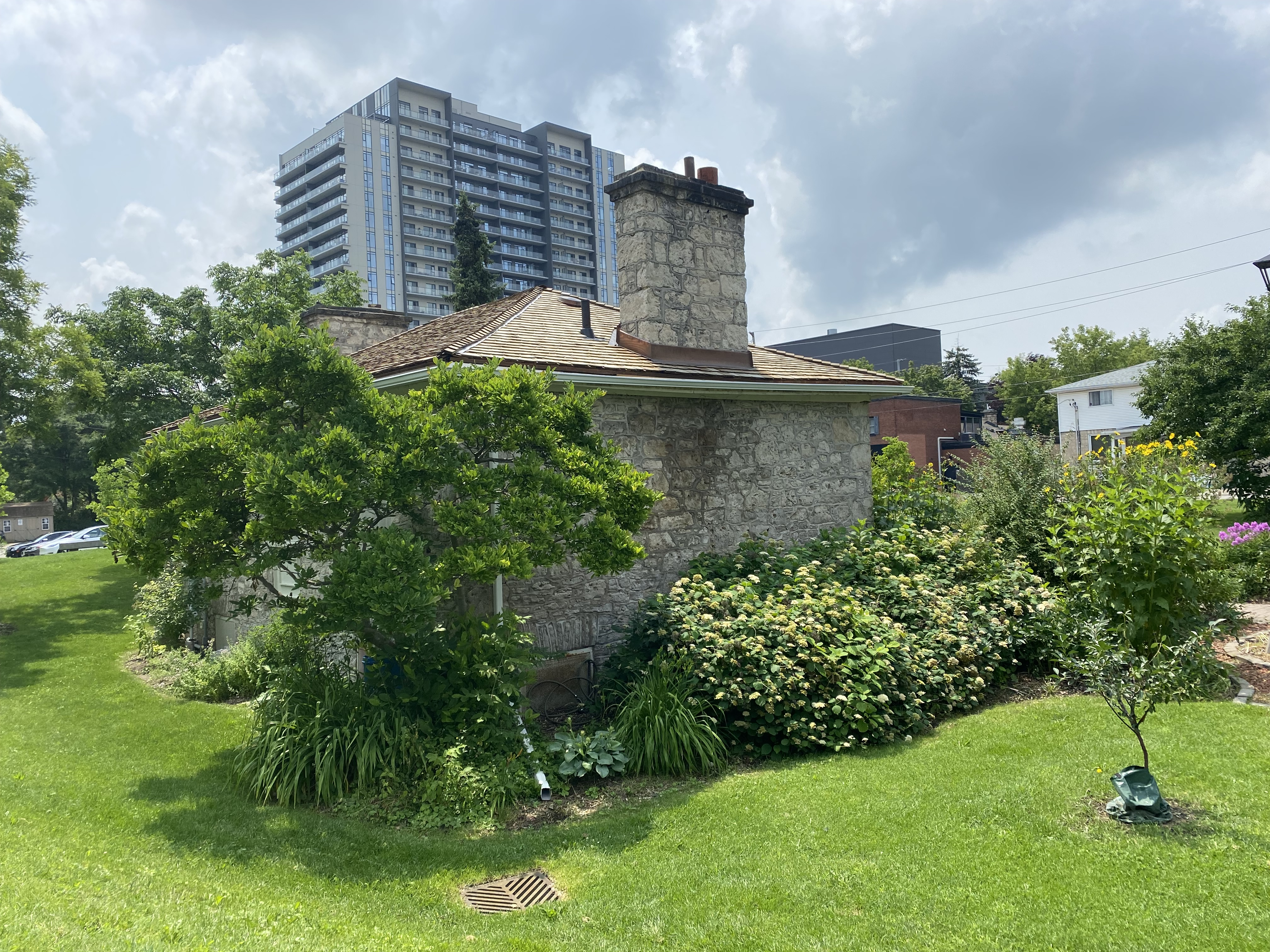
Back of McDougall Cottage in Galt

The McDougall Cottage in downtown Galt is a historic granite and limestone cottage built in 1858. It is currently a museum.

== Demographics ==
Historical population
Year	Pop.	±%
1976	72,383	—
1981	76,300	+5.4%
1986	79,920	+4.7%
1991	92,772	+16.1%
1996	101,429	+9.3%
2001	110,372	+8.8%
2006	120,371	+9.1%
2011	126,750	+5.3%
2016	129,920	+2.5%
2021	138,479	+6.6%

In the 2021 Census of Population conducted by Statistics Canada, Cambridge had a population of 138,479 living in 51,269 of its 53,013 total private dwellings, a change of 6.6% from its 2016 population of 129,920. With a land area of 112.99 km^{2} (43.63 sq mi), it had a population density of 1,225.6/km^{2} (3,174.3/sq mi) in 2021.

At the census metropolitan area (CMA) level in the 2021 census, the Kitchener – Cambridge – Waterloo CMA had a population of 575,847 living in 219,060 of its 229,809 total private dwellings, a change of 9.9% from its 2016 population of 523,894. With a land area of 1,092.33 km^{2} (421.75 sq mi), it had a population density of 527.2/km^{2} (1,365.4/sq mi) in 2021.

In 2021, the median age was 39.2 years, lower than the provincial median age of 41.6 years. 17.7% of the population was under 15 years of age and 16% was 65 years and over.

=== Ethnicity ===
Ethnic origin	Population	Percent
English	29,555	21.6
Irish	22,820	18.7
Scottish	23,215	16.9
Canadian	21,210	15.5
German	15,350	11.2
Portuguese	10,935	8.0
French	8,870	6.5
Indian (India)	8,220	6.0
Italian	5,870	4.3
Dutch	5,495	4.0
British Isles N.O.S	5,350	3.9
Polish	4,490	3.3
Pakistani	3,480	2.5
Ukrainian	2,785	2.0
Source: StatCan (includes multiple responses)

According to the 2021 census, the population of Cambridge was approximately 74.3% White, 23.9% visible minority and 1.9% Indigenous. The largest visible minority group, at 11.7% of the population, was South Asian, followed by Black (3.6%), Latin American (1.7%), Filipino (1.3%), Southeast Asian (1.2%), Arab (1.1%), and Chinese (0.9%).

Panethnic groups in the City of Cambridge (2001–2021)
Panethnic group	2021		2016		2011		2006		2001	
Panethnic group	Pop.	%	Pop.	%	Pop.	%	Pop.	%	Pop.	%
European (Note: Statistic includes all persons that did not make up part of a visible minority or an indigenous identity.)	101,815	74.25%	105,405	82.45%	106,810	85.41%	104,785	87.75%	98,320	90.19%
South Asian	16,095	11.74%	7,885	6.17%	6,520	5.21%	5,250	4.4%	3,150	2.89%
African	4,880	3.56%	3,255	2.55%	2,320	1.86%	1,845	1.55%	1,745	1.6%
Southeast Asian (Note: Statistic includes total responses of "Filipino" and "Southeast Asian" under visible minority section on census.)	3,515	2.56%	2,675	2.09%	2,130	1.7%	1,870	1.57%	1,575	1.44%
Indigenous	2,575	1.88%	2,540	1.99%	2,470	1.98%	1,275	1.07%	755	0.69%
Latin American	2,360	1.72%	1,610	1.26%	1,265	1.01%	1,360	1.14%	950	0.87%
Middle Eastern (Note: Statistic includes total responses of "West Asian" and "Arab" under visible minority section on census.)	2,125	1.55%	1,455	1.14%	1,090	0.87%	850	0.71%	515	0.47%
East Asian (Note: Statistic includes total responses of "Chinese", "Korean", and "Japanese" under visible minority section on census.)	1,790	1.31%	1,775	1.39%	1,555	1.24%	1,340	1.12%	1,335	1.22%
Other (Note: Statistic includes total responses of "Visible minority, n.i.e." and "Multiple visible minorities" under visible minority section on census.)	1,960	1.43%	1,225	0.96%	885	0.71%	840	0.7%	670	0.61%
Total responses	137,120	99.02%	127,840	98.4%	125,055	98.66%	119,410	99.2%	109,010	98.77%
Total population	138,479	100%	129,920	100%	126,748	100%	120,371	100%	110,372	100%

- Note: Totals greater than 100% due to multiple origin responses.

=== Religion ===
As of 2021, 54.6% of the population identify as Christian (down from 69.6% in 2011). Others identify as Muslim (6.8%), Sikh (2.9%), Hindu (2.9%), and Buddhist (0.7%). 31.4% of the population report no religious affiliation, up from 24% in 2011

== Transport ==
=== Roads ===
There are two main arterial roads that form an 'X' through the city. The intersecting point is colloquially referred to as the Delta. The intersection was once known as Hunter's Corners. The Delta is adjacent to a Canadian Pacific Rail spur and the Babcock & Wilcox plant, and at peak rush hour times traffic would back up for miles radiating outwards from the Delta. A number of strategies were investigated to alleviate delays caused by trains and as of December 2012 construction of a bridge over Hespeler Road commenced, and was completed 18 months later. While this eliminated delays caused by trains, the Delta remains a very busy intersection. Multiphase traffic signals with restrictions on right turns on red constrain vehicular throughput compared to typical signalized intersections. Highway 8 (Ontario) travels through the city as Shantz Hill Road, King Street in Preston, Coronation Boulevard, and Dundas Street, linking Cambridge to Kitchener and Waterloo in the west, and Hamilton in the east. Highway 24 runs through Cambridge as Hespeler Road, Water Street, and Ainslie Street, connecting to Guelph in the northeast and Brantford in the south.

=== Bridges ===
Cambridge has some of the most historic bridges in Waterloo Region. The Black Bridge Road Bridge (1916) is Cambridge's only truss bridge and has been designated a heritage site since 1997. It is still driven upon, though it is prone to major flooding and subsequent closure in the spring. The Main Street Bridge (1931) is a bowstring arch bridge made of concrete and is set over the Grand River. Also in Cambridge is the Park Hill Road Bridge (2002), formally known as the Queen Street Bridge (1933). This bridge was one of the three bridges credited with contributing to the development of early Galt. The bridge was reconstructed and widened to four lanes in 2002 retaining much of the original appearance. The Mill Creek Bridge (1837) in Cambridge is the oldest remaining bridge structure in the region and one of only two stone masonry arch bridges in the Region of Waterloo.

In 2007, the Region of Waterloo completed the first pedestrian/cycling bridge to cross the 401. This bridge connects Morningside Drive (Cambridge) with Doon Valley Drive (Kitchener) and is an integral part of the Grand River trails system.

=== Public transportation ===
Since 2000, public transport throughout the Region of Waterloo has been provided by Grand River Transit (GRT), which was created by a merger of the former Cambridge Transit and Kitchener Transit. GRT operates a number of routes in Cambridge that provide service within Cambridge itself and service to Kitchener & Waterloo, including 1 Bus Rapid Transit line and 2 limited-stop express bus lines. Ainslie Street Terminal serves as the main transportation hub for Grand River Transit and Coach Canada, while Sportsworld GO serves as the primary transit hub for GO Transit in Cambridge.

Frequency of transit may vary between routes. Some routes like 51 Hespeler may provide faster & more frequent service throughout the week, while routes like the 60 Burnett receive lower service and operate for lesser time.

Coach Canada runs almost every two hours during the daytime between Hamilton and Kitchener, and connecting to Niagara Falls.

=== Railways ===
The Canadian Pacific Railway's Galt Subdivision is the primary rail corridor in the city. It passes through the community of Galt, from which it takes its name, on an approximately east–west axis. It is a part of the Canadian Pacific mainline connecting Toronto with points southwest. Other cities on the Galt Subdivision (from east to west) are Toronto, Mississauga, and London; the line also passes through the towns of Milton and Woodstock.

Although freight trains serving the Toyota factory are a common sight in Cambridge, the city at present has no passenger rail service. As of 2021, Cambridge is the only municipality in Ontario with both a population of over 100,000 people and no passenger rail service. The nearest Via Rail stations in the Quebec City-Windsor Corridor are Kitchener station, Guelph station, and Brantford.

The most easily accessible GO Transit railway stations are in Kitchener, Guelph, Milton, and Aldershot. GO bus service between Mississauga, Cambridge, and Kitchener was introduced in 2009 as a forerunner to GO train service to Kitchener.

==== Light rail ====
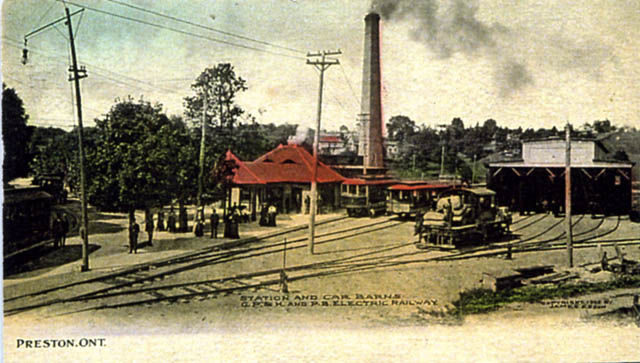
The car barn for the Galt, Preston, Hespeler and Preston, Berlin railway

The first appearance of light rail in Cambridge was an electric street railway system between Galt and Preston, which was called the Galt and Preston Street Railway. This later expanded with a branch line from Preston to Hespeler, and was subsequently renamed the Galt, Preston and Hespeler Street Railway (GP&H). A separate extension line, the Preston and Berlin Street Railway, was built and then merged with the GP&H, and the whole system was renamed the Grand River Railway, which at its greatest extent ran as far north as Waterloo. With this extension, as well as infrastructure upgrades, it became a true interurban. A sister railway, the Lake Erie and Northern Railway, connected to the Grand River Railway at Galt, running south to Port Dover via Paris, Brantford, and Simcoe. The electric rail system ended passenger services in April 1955.

In June 2011, the Waterloo regional council approved the plan for a light rail transit (LRT) service from Conestoga Mall in north Waterloo to Fairview Park Mall in south Kitchener, with express buses through to Cambridge. In Phase 1, which started operating in 2019, the Ion LRT runs between Waterloo and Kitchener, passing through the downtown and uptown areas of the two cities. The stations for the rapid buses along the southern half, known as Stage 2, were put in place by 2016.

Stage 2 of the rail line would run from Fairway to the "downtown Galt" area of Cambridge. At least one journalist has pointed out the similarity between this plan and the electric Grand River Railway of the early 1900s that connected Cambridge, Kitchener, and Waterloo. Cambridge Mayor Doug Craig was a determined opponent of the plan. He felt that a series of buses would be just as effective but much less expensive.

The Ion rapid transit service in Kitchener-Waterloo (Stage 1) began on June 21, 2019, after delays caused by Bombardier's late deliver of the trains needed for the service. Most of the rails had been installed by the end of 2016; the maintenance facility and all underground utility work had been completed. The start date of service was postponed to early 2018, however, because of delays in the manufacture and delivery of the vehicles by Bombardier Transportation. As of February 24, 2017, only a single sample of a train car had arrived for testing.

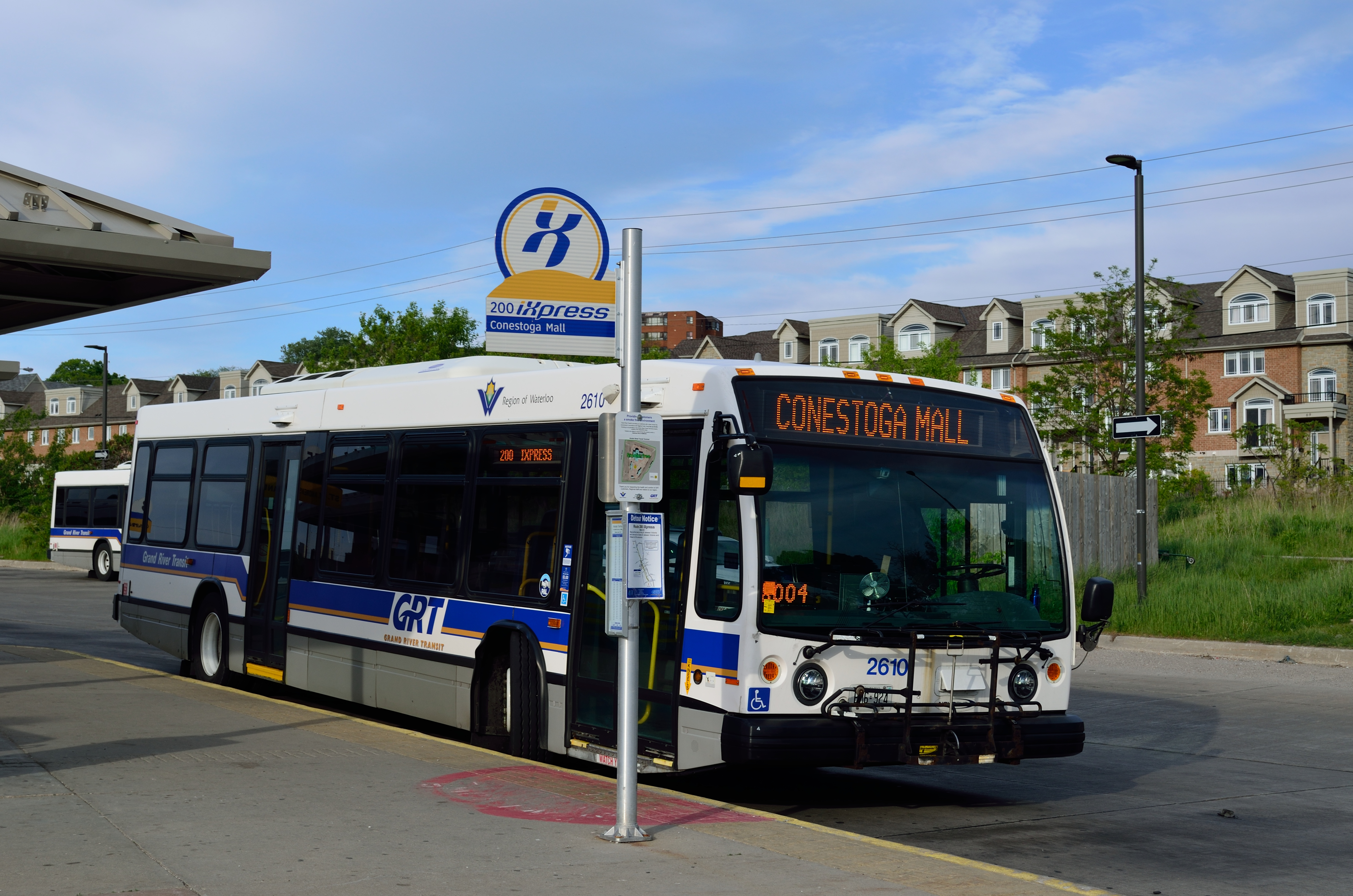
The original iXpress service which preceded the Ion rapid transit plan; other iXpress routes remain.

In late February 2017, plans for the Stage 2 (Cambridge section) of the Ion rail service were still in the very early stage; public consultations had just started at the time. Some routes and stops had been agreed upon in 2011, but the final plan will not be established until mid 2017. No estimated date has been published for the start of light rail service to Cambridge.

Until the completion of Stage 2, rapid transit is provided between Fairview Park Mall and the Ainslie Street Transit Terminal (in the downtown Galt area) using branded buses with WiFi. Other stops for this Ion bus are at Hespeler Road at the Delta, Can-Amera, Cambridge Centre, Pinebush, and Sportsworld. The ION bus provides a direct link to the LRT half of the system in Kitchener-Waterloo.

==== GO train service proposals ====
In the years following the discontinuance of all passenger rail service to Cambridge, municipal officials lobbied for its return. In 2013, then-mayor Doug Craig reported positive results from negotiations with the Ontario Ministry of Transportation around an extension of GO Transit's Milton line service from its terminus at Milton; both Galt and Milton are located along the Canadian Pacific Railway's Galt Subdivision, which Milton line trains use. Craig pointed to the number of existing GO bus riders in Cambridge, as well as the number of Cambridge residents driving to Milton or to Paris, the latter to board Via Rail intercity trains which could reach Toronto in around an hour. The full business case for the Milton line extension, entitled "Cambridge on the GO", was released in 2015.

In 2018, citing the inability to successfully negotiate with Canadian Pacific for further access for passenger trains along the Galt Subdivision, regional and municipal governments, along with Metrolinx and the Ministry of Transportation, began to pursue a possible passenger rail connection to the Kitchener line at Guelph Central Station, using the existing CN Fergus Subdivision to reach it. An early 2021 report detailed the second stage of the feasibility study, which addressed details around service levels and station locations. The report proposed a service launch of 2026. Proposed train frequencies would be between one and four per hour, with travel times of around 15 minutes. Ridership estimates for 2026 would be 80,000–385,000 per year in different scenarios, dependent on the level of infrastructure investment in the line. The study estimated a lower cost and travel time to Toronto compared to driving directly or using existing GO or Via services; this differential was projected to increase approaching the mid-21st century, driven by road congestion and the effects of infrastructure investment on the Kitchener line, which would decrease train travel times. The study also argued that the service would aid in intensification of development in low-density areas of Cambridge, be highly deliverable due to its use of an existing rail corridor, and improve labour mobility and economic development in Southwestern Ontario. The preferred station location was at Pinebush, which is also planned to be an Ion LRT station, making direct transfers between the light rail system and Cambridge–Guelph trains possible. Cambridge city councillors responded to the report favourably, highlighting a positive response from constituents.

=== Air ===
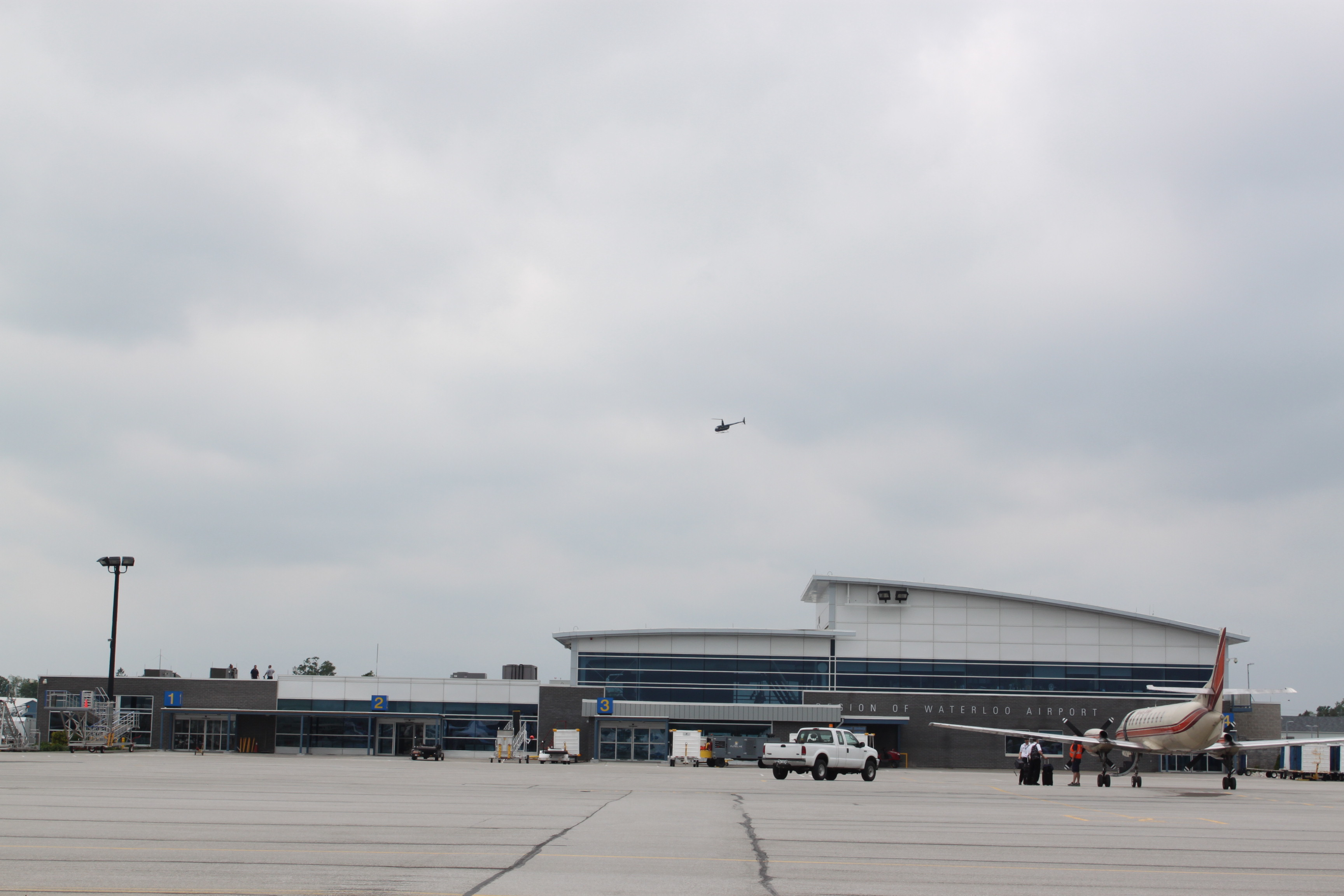
Waterloo Terminal as seen from Taxiway Bravo

The nearest airport to Cambridge is the Region of Waterloo International Airport in neighboring Breslau. While it is a thriving general aviation field, commercial airlines from this location serve few destinations. On June 22, 2016 American Airlines announced it would be suspending flights to Chicago from this airport effective October 5, 2016.

== Sports and recreation ==
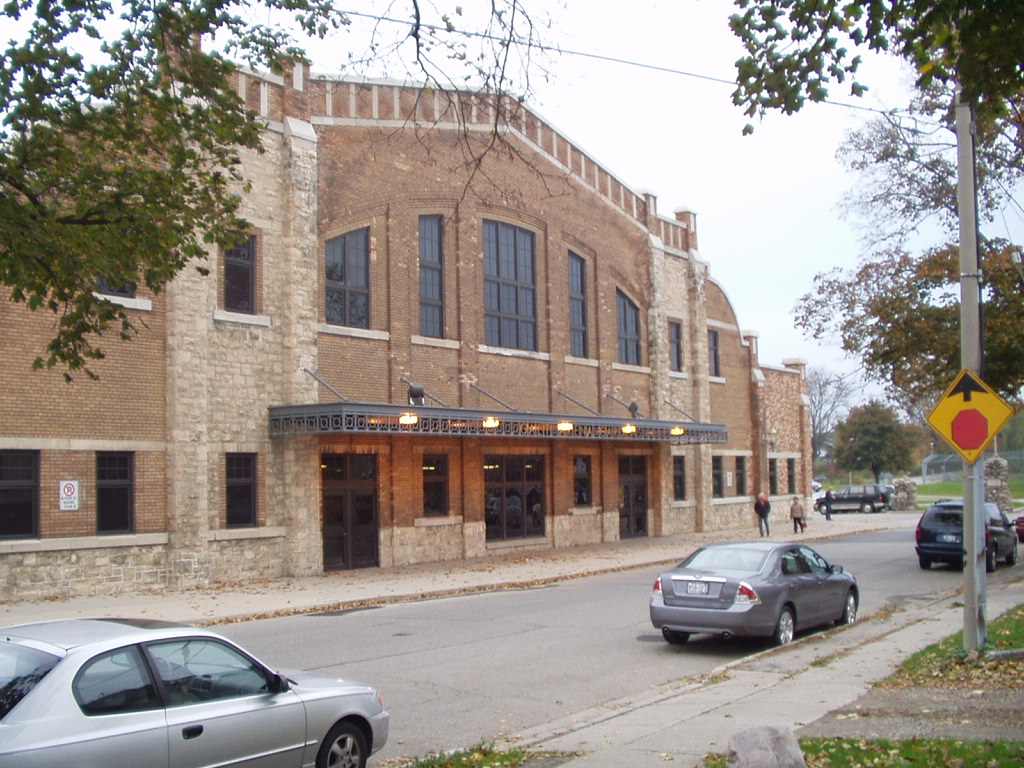
Galt Arena Gardens, opened in 1922, is the oldest operating arena in Ontario.

Cambridge has 365 ha of parkland, 99 parks, over 140 sports fields, and many golf courses. As well, the city has over 70 km of urban and natural trails, 18 km of which run along the Grand and Speed Rivers.

From July 30 to August 2, 2026, Cambridge, Kitchener, and Waterloo co-hosted the 2026 Ontario Summer Games.

=== Teams ===
The Cambridge Turbos are the most successful team in the National Ringette League with six titles at the Canadian Ringette Championships, including three straight from 2015 to 2017.

Cambridge is the home of the Greater Ontario Junior Hockey League's Cambridge Redhawks (Previously The Cambridge Winter Hawks.) The Winter Hawks were the winners of the 2006 and 2007 Sutherland Cup. Cambridge also was the home of the four-time Allan Cup winning Cambridge Hornets of the Original OHA Senior A League, the last OHA Senior A Hockey League, and Major League Hockey. The team folded in 2006 following a points deduction by the Ontario Hockey Association for fielding an ineligible player, which caused the team to miss the playoffs. Following the dispute, the owners attempted to sell the team but were unsuccessful. Several attempts to revive the club have failed.

The Scorpions Youth Volleyball Club was formed in 2009 and has over 400 youth registered in their indoor and beach volleyball programs. The Scorpions have 8 competitive indoor teams. In September 2012 the Scorpions have the City of Cambridge 1st every boys competitive team (15U team) playing in the Ontario Volleyball Association. The club is a member of the Ontario Volleyball Association, with Learn to Play and House League programs for girls and boys Grades 3–12. They also have one of the largest youth beach volleyball programs in Ontario.

The Cambridge Aquajets are a competitive swim team that was founded in the early 1950s. The club practices at all of the City of Cambridge pools throughout the year.

The outstanding athletic achievement of individuals participating in sports has been honoured in Cambridge every November at the Cambridge Sports Awards banquet since 1974.

The Galt Red Wings were a junior ice hockey team based in Galt that played in the Ontario Hockey Association from 1944 to 1947. They were operated as an affiliate of the Detroit Red Wings of the National Hockey League. During the 1944–45 season, the Red Wings were led by Gordie Howe. They reached the league finals for the J. Ross Robertson Cup in 1945, but lost to Toronto St. Michael's Majors in four games. Their home arena was the Galt Arena Gardens.

=== Recreational buildings ===
The City of Cambridge has 6 public skating arenas: Dickson Centre, Duncan McIntosh Arena, Galt Arena Gardens, Hespeler Memorial Arena, Karl Homuth Arena, and Preston Auditorium; and 2 private skating areas: Cambridge Ice Centre and Ice Park. As well, the city has 2 public indoor pools (John Dolson Centre and W.G. Johnson Centre) and 3 public outdoor pools (Edward Newland Pool, George Hancock Pool, and Kinsmen – Soper Pool), in addition to the indoor pool at the Chaplin Family YMCA.

Cambridge has one lawn bowling club: the Preston Lawn Bowling Club is on Queenston Road in the Preston area of the city.

On October 24, 2008, the city completed the COM DEV Indoor Soccer Park. The $2.8 million project was funded by the City of Cambridge, COM DEV, and the Cambridge Youth Soccer Club, and will help accommodate a large number of kids playing soccer in the Waterloo Region.

== Notable people ==
- Tim Brent, hockey player
- Nathan Brannen, three time track Olympian, 1500m (2008, 2012, 2016)
- Raymond Brown, competitive swimmer, Olympic swimmer 1992
- Jessica Camara, boxer
- Adam Butcher, actor
- Derrick Campbell, Olympic short-track speedskater (1994 and 1998)
- Alexandra Chaves, dancer and actress
- Louie DeBrusk, hockey player and announcer
- Jake Dotchin, hockey player
- Carmen Douma-Hussar, runner, 2004 World Indoor Championships silver medallist in 1500m
- Rob Ducey, baseball player, first Ontario-born player to play for the Toronto Blue Jays
- Hayley Elsaesser, fashion designer
- J. R. Fitzpatrick, NASCAR racer
- Madeline Gardiner, Canadian Olympic gymnast Alternate 2012
- Russ Gillow, hockey player
- Jet Greaves, hockey player
- Peter Gzowski, writer, newspaper and magazine editor, CBC Radio host
- C. Ernst Harth, actor
- Thomas Hasal, soccer player
- The Highlanders, Derek Graham-Couch and Russell Murray, a professional wrestling tag-team, who wrestled in World Wrestling Entertainment
- Bob Hodges, National Hockey League linesman
- Lyndon John X, reggae musician
- Ian Leggatt, pro golfer
- Bryan Little, hockey player
- Kirk Maltby, hockey player
- Steve McKenna, hockey player
- Victoria Moors, Canadian Olympic gymnast (2012)
- John Errington Moss, academic, author and Fellow of the Royal Society of Canada
- Hilda Ranscombe, captain of the Preston Rivulettes
- Gord Renwick, recipient of the Order of Hockey in Canada
- Jim Schoenfeld, hockey player
- Donald Shaver, poultry industry pioneer
- Ron Shaver, figure skater, 1977 Canadian national champion
- John Tanner, ice hockey goaltender
- Scott Thorman, baseball player
- Yvonne Tousek, Canadian Olympic gymnast (1996 and 2000)
- Amelia Beers Warnock, poet, critic, and short story writer
- James K. Wright, composer and musicologist

== See also ==
- Quebec City–Windsor Corridor
- List of cities in Ontario
- List of municipalities in Ontario
