= Results of the 2007 Ontario general election by riding =

Outcome of a 2007 Ontario General Election

Candidates of the 2007 Ontario general election
← 2003	October 10, 2007	2011 →

The 2007 Ontario general election took place on Wednesday, October 10, 2007. The list of candidates was finalized by Elections Ontario on September 19, 2007.

== Candidates by region ==
=== Ottawa ===
Electoral district	Candidates						Incumbent
Electoral district	Liberal	PC	NDP	Green	Family Coalition	Other	Incumbent
Carleton— Mississippi Mills	Megan Cornell; 16 776 (31.93%)	Norm Sterling; 25 126 (47.83%)	Michael Hadskis; 4 002 (7.62%)	John Ogilvie; 5 517 (10.50%)	Reynolds James; 419 (0.80%)	Rob Alexander (Libert); 693 (1.32%)	Norm Sterling
Nepean— Carleton	Jai Aggarwal; 17 731 (32.94%)	Lisa MacLeod; 27 070 (50.28%)	Tristan Maack; 4 000 (7.43%)	Gordon Kubanek; 4 500 (8.36%)	Suzanne Fortin; Wikinews interview 533 (0.99%)		Lisa MacLeod
Ottawa Centre	Yasir Naqvi; 18 255 (34.91%)	Trina Morissette; 10 430 (19.92%)	Will Murray; 16 161 (30.90%)	Greg Laxton; 6 458 (12.35%)	Danny Moran; 516 (0.99%)	Richard Eveleigh (Ind); 283 (0.54%); Stuart Ryan (Comm.); 204 (0.39%)	Richard Patten†
Ottawa— Orléans	Phil McNeely; 25 649 (52.86%)	Graham Fox; 16 695 (34.41%)	Andrée Germain; 3 088 (6.36%)	Akbar Manoussi; 2 214 (4.56%)	Jeremy Atkinson; 692 (1.43%)	David McGruer (Freedom); 183 (0.38%)	Phil McNeely
Ottawa South	Dalton McGuinty; 24 015 (50.13%)	Richard Raymond; 14 206 (29.66%)	Edelweiss D'Andrea; 4 467 (9.33%)	John Ford; 3 902 (8.15%)	David MacDonald; 927 (1.94%)	Jean-Serge Brisson (Libert); 384 (0.80%)	Dalton McGuinty
Ottawa— Vanier	Madeleine Meilleur; 20 954 (50.96%)	Bruce Poulin; 9 169 (22.30%)	Ric Dagenais; 6 049 (14.71%)	Leonard Poole; 4 293 (10.44%)	Frank Cioppa; 396 (0.96%)	Robert Larter (Ind); 207 (0.44%)	Madeleine Meilleur
Ottawa West— Nepean	Jim Watson; 23 842 (50.64%)	Mike Patton; 14 971 (31.80%)	Lynn Hamilton; 4 564 (9.69%)	Martin Hyde; Wikinews interview 2 903 (6.17%)	John Pacheco; 592 (1.26%)	Robert Gauthier (Ind); 207 (0.44%)	Jim Watson

=== Eastern Ontario ===
Electoral district	Candidates						Incumbent
Electoral district	Liberal	PC	NDP	Green	Family Coalition	Other	Incumbent
Glengarry— Prescott— Russell	Jean-Marc Lalonde; 24 345 (60.51%)	Dennis Pommainville; 10 927 (27.16%)	Josée Blanchette; 2 281 (5.67%)	Karolyne Pickett; 2 344 (5.83%)	Vicki Gunn; 337 (0.84%)		Jean-Marc Lalonde
Kingston and the Islands	John Gerretsen; 23 277 (47.23%)	John Rapin; 11 001 (22.32%)	Rick Downes; 10 129 (20.55%)	Bridget Doherty; 4 321 (8.77%)	Chris Beneteau; 419 (0.85%)	Mark Fournier (Freedom); 137 (0.28%)	John Gerretsen
Lanark— Frontenac— Lennox and Addington	Ian Wilson; 17 393 (38.76%)	Randy Hillier; 18 213 (40.58%)	Ross Sutherland; 5 623 (12.53%)	Rolly Montpellier; 3 186 (7.10%)	Stella Postma; 462 (1.03%)		new district
Leeds— Grenville	Lori Bryden; 11 602 (28.67%)	Bob Runciman; 22 755 (56.24%)	Pauline Kuhlman; 2 821 (6.97%)	Jeanie Warnock; 2 907 (7.19%)	Michael Dwyer; 377 (0.93%)		Bob Runciman
Prince Edward— Hastings	Leona Dombrowsky; 20 963 (46.36%)	Eric DenOuden; 14 840 (32.82%)	Jodie Jenkins; 6 287 (13.90%)	Jim Arkilander; 2 663 (5.89%)	Vito Luceno; 297 (0.66%)	Trueman Tuck (Republican); 166 (0.37%)	Leona Dombrowsky
Prince Edward— Hastings	Leona Dombrowsky; 20 963 (46.36%)	Eric DenOuden; 14 840 (32.82%)	Jodie Jenkins; 6 287 (13.90%)	Jim Arkilander; 2 663 (5.89%)	Vito Luceno; 297 (0.66%)	Trueman Tuck (Republican); 166 (0.37%)	merged district
Prince Edward— Hastings	Leona Dombrowsky; 20 963 (46.36%)	Eric DenOuden; 14 840 (32.82%)	Jodie Jenkins; 6 287 (13.90%)	Jim Arkilander; 2 663 (5.89%)	Vito Luceno; 297 (0.66%)	Trueman Tuck (Republican); 166 (0.37%)	Ernie Parsons†
Renfrew— Nipissing— Pembroke	Sean Kelly; 9 905 (24.72%)	John Yakabuski; 24 975 (62.34%)	Felicite Stairs; Wikinews interview 3 038 (7.58%)	Mark Mackenzie; 1 777 (4.44%)	Bruce Dean; 292 (0.73%)	Tilton Beaumont (Cor); 76 (0.19%)	John Yakabuski
Stormont— Dundas— South Glengarry	Jim Brownell; 18 660 (48.86%)	Chris Savard; 14 794 (38.73%)	Lori Taylor; 2 813 (7.37%)	Elaine Kennedy; 1 680 (4.40%)	Lukas Bebjack; 247 (0.65%)		Jim Brownell

=== Central Ontario ===
Electoral district	Candidates						Incumbent
Electoral district	Liberal	PC	NDP	Green	Family Coalition	Other	Incumbent
Barrie	Aileen Carroll; 19 548 (42.20%)	Joe Tascona; 18 167 (39.22%)	Larry Taylor; 3 700 (7.99%)	Erich Jacoby-Hawkins; 4 385 (9.47%)	Roberto Sales; 173 (0.37%)	Paolo Fabrizio (Libert); 168 (0.36%); Darren Roskam (Ind); 102 (0.22%); Daniel Gary Predie (Ind); 77 (0.17%)	Joe Tascona
Bruce— Grey— Owen Sound	Selwyn Hicks; 6 774 (14.93%)	Bill Murdoch; 21 156 (46.61%)	Paul Johnstone (Wikinews interview); 1 721 (3.79%)	Shane Jolley; 15 039 (33.14%)	Irma De Vries; 550 (1.21%)	William Cook (Reform); 145 (0.32%)	Bill Murdoch
Dufferin— Caledon	Elizabeth Hall; 12 638 (32.01%)	Sylvia Jones; 16 522 (41.85%)	Lynda McDougall; 3 893 (9.86%)	Rob Strang; 6 430 (16.29%)			John Tory†
Durham	Betty Somerville; 14 730 (32.15%)	John O'Toole; 21 515 (46.96%)	Catherine Robinson; 5 521 (12.05%)	June Davis; 4 053 (8.85%)			John O'Toole
Haliburton— Kawartha Lakes— Brock	Rick Johnson; 14 327 (29.51%)	Laurie Scott; 24 273 (49.99%)	Joan Corigan; 5 785 (11.92%)	Doug Smith; 3 475 (7.16%)	Jake Pothaar; 301 (0.62%)	Bill Denby (Freedom); 391 (0.81%)	Laurie Scott
Newmarket— Aurora	Christina Bisanz; 18 105 (39.74%)	Frank Klees; 19 460 (42.72%)	Mike Seaward; 3 290 (7.22%)	John McRogers; 4 182 (9.18%)	Tad Brudzinski; 249 (0.55%)	Craig Hodgins (Libert); 269 (0.59%)	Frank Klees
Northumberland— Quinte West	Lou Rinaldi; 22 287 (45.37%)	Cathy Galt; 15 330 (31.21%)	Carol Blaind; 6 492 (13.22%)	Judy Smith Torrie; 5 012 (10.20%)			Lou Rinaldi
Peterborough	Jeff Leal; 24 466 (47.72%)	Bruce Fitzpatrick; 13 176 (25.70%)	Dave Nickle; 8 523 (16.62%)	Miriam Stucky; 4 473 (8.72%)	Paul Morgan; 634 (1.24%)		Jeff Leal
Simcoe—Grey	Steven H. Fishman; 12 447 (25.97%)	Jim Wilson; 24 270 (50.65%)	Katy Austin; 4 417 (9.22%)	Peter Ellis; 5 428 (11.33%)	Steven Taylor; 361 (0.75%)	Phil Bender (Libert); 724 (1.51%); Owen Alastair Ferguson(Ind); 273 (0.57%)	Jim Wilson
Simcoe North	Laura Domsy; 14 094 (30.55%)	Garfield Dunlop; 22 986 (49.82%)	Andrew Hill; 4 240 (9.19%)	Wayne Varcoe; 4 709 (10.21%)		Dane Raybauld (Libert); 112 (0.24%)	Garfield Dunlop
York—Simcoe	John Gilbank; 12 785 (30.83%)	Julia Munro; 19 173 (46.23%)	Nancy Morrison; 4 205 (10.14%)	Jim Reeves; 4 664 (11.25%)	Victor Carvalho; 297 (0.72%)	Caley McKibbin (Libert); 348 (0.84%)	Julia Munro

=== Southern Durham and York ===
Electoral district	Candidates						Incumbent
Electoral district	Liberal	PC	NDP	Green	Family Coalition	Other	Incumbent
Ajax— Pickering	Joe Dickson; 19 857 (49.07%)	Kevin Ashe; 13 898 (34.35%)	Bala Thavarajasoorier; 3 275 (8.09%)	Cecile Willert; 3 067 (7.58%)	Andrew Carvalho; 368 (0.91%)		new district
Markham— Unionville	Michael Chan; 21 149 (59.47%)	Ki Kit Li; 9 574 (26.92%)	Andy Arifin; 2 597 (7.30%)	Bernadette Manning; 1 910 (5.37%)	Leon Williams; 335 (0.94%)		Michael Chan
Oak Ridges— Markham	Helena Jaczek; 28 564 (48.22%)	Phil Bannon; 21 367 (36.07%)	Janice Hagan; 4 698 (7.93%)	Attila Nagy; 3 815 (6.44%)	Pat Redmond; 455 (0.77%)	Doug Ransom (Ind); 342 (0.58%)	new district
Oshawa	Faelyne Templer; 8 764 (21.40%)	Jerry Ouellette; 15 977 (39.02%)	Sid Ryan; 13 482 (32.92%)	Alexander Kemp; 2 474 (6.04%)	Jeffrey Streutker; 253 (0.62%)		Jerry Ouellette
Pickering— Scarborough East	Wayne Arthurs; 19 762 (48.63%)	Diana Hall; 12 884 (31.70%)	Andrea Moffat; 4 563 (11.23%)	Anita Lachlan; 2 572 (6.33%)	Mitchell Persaud; 210 (0.52%)	Josh Insang (Libert); 375 (0.92%); John Newell (Ind); 275 (0.68%)	Wayne Arthurs
Richmond Hill	Reza Moridi; 19 456 (47.83%)	Alex Yuan; 14 127 (34.73%)	Nella Cotrupi; 3 565 (8.76%)	Liz Couture; 3 210 (7.89%)	Lisa Kidd; 318 (0.78%)		new district
Thornhill	Mario Racco; 20 497 (42.31%)	Peter Shurman; 22 025 (45.47%)	Sandra Parrott; 2 867 (5.92%)	Lloyd Helferty; 2 507 (5.18%)	Nathan Kidd; 216 (0.45%)	Malcolm Kojokaro (Ind); 187 (0.39%); Lindsay King (Freedom); 142 (0.29%)	Mario Racco
Vaughan	Greg Sorbara; 28 964 (61.90%)	Gayani Weerasinghe; 8 759 (18.72%)	Rick Morelli; 5 470 (11.69%)	Russell Korus; 2 975 (6.36%)		Savino Quatela (Ind); 623 (1.33%)	Greg Sorbara
Whitby— Oshawa	Laura Hammer; 18 560 (35.99%)	Christine Elliott; 22 694 (44.0%)	Nigel Moses; 5 733 (11.12%)	Doug Anderson; Wikinews interview 3 745 (7.26%)	Dale Chilvers; 275 (0.53%)	Marty Gobin (Libert); 414 (0.80%); Bill Frampton (Freedom); 150 (0.29%)	Christine Elliott

=== Toronto ===
==== Toronto East Region ====
Electoral district	Candidates						Incumbent
Electoral district	Liberal	PC	NDP	Green	Family Coalition	Other	Incumbent
Scarborough— Agincourt	Gerry Phillips; 19 541 (58.08%)	John Del Grande; 8 531 (25.36%)	Yvette Blackburn; 3 531 (7.31%)	George Pappas; 1 511 (4.49%)	Max Wang; 532 (1.58%)		Gerry Phillips
Scarborough Centre	Brad Duguid; 17 775 (53.66%)	Samy Appadurai; 8 320 (25.12%)	Kathleen Mathurin; 4 401 (13.29%)	Andrew Strachan; 1 827 (5.52%)	Tom Lang; 451 (1.36%)	David Predovich (Libert); 349 (1.05%)	Brad Duguid
Scarborough— Guildwood	Margarett Best; 14 430 (42.52%)	Gary Grant; 9 502 (28.00%)	Neethan Shan; 7 441 (21.92%)	Glenn Kitchen; 1 811 (5.34%)	Daniel Carvalho; 267 (0.79%)	Sam Apelbaum (Libert); 484 (1.43%)	Mary Anne Chambers†
Scarborough— Rouge River	Bas Balkissoon; 22 307 (65.06%)	Horace Gooden; 4 960 (14.47%)	Sheila White (Wikinews interview); 4 691 (13.68%)	Serge Abbat; 1 276 (3.72%)	Joseph Carvalho; 569 (1.66%)	Alan Mercer (Libert); 486 (1.42%)	Bas Balkissoon
Scarborough Southwest	Lorenzo Berardinetti; 15 114 (46.15%)	Gary Crawford; 8 359 (25.53%)	Jay Sarkar; 5 930 (18.11%)	Stefan Dixon; 2 649 (8.09%)	Victor Borkowski; 399 (1.22%)	George Dance (Libert); 296 (0.90%)	Lorenzo Berardinetti

==== Toronto North Region ====
Electoral district	Candidates						Incumbent
Electoral district	Liberal	PC	NDP	Green	Family Coalition	Other	Incumbent
Don Valley East	David Caplan; 19 667 (55.63%)	Angela Kennedy; 8 878 (25.11%)	Mary Trapani Hynes; 3 759 (10.63%)	Trifon Haitas; 2 287 (6.47%)	Ryan Kidd; 198 (0.56%)	Stella Kargiannakis (Ind); 467 (1.32%); Wayne Simmons (Freedom); 99 (0.28%)	David Caplan
Don Valley West	Kathleen Wynne; 23 080 (50.44%)	John Tory; 18 156 (39.68%)	Mike Kenny; 2 138 (4.67%)	Adrian Walker; 2 202 (4.81%)	Daniel Kidd; 183 (0.40%)		Kathleen Wynne
Eglinton— Lawrence	Mike Colle; 17 402 (43.23%)	Bernie Tanz; 15 257 (37.90%)	Karin Wiens; 4 039 (10.03%)	Andrew James; 2 871 (7.13%)	Rina Morra; 229 (0.57%)	Tom Gelmon (Libert); 235 (0.58%); Franz Cauchi (Freedom); 130 (0.32%); Joseph Young (Ind [Comm League]); 90 (0.22%)	Mike Colle
Willowdale	David Zimmer; 21 066 (47.73%)	David Shiner; 15 588 (35.08%)	Rini Ghosh; 3 699 (8.34%)	Torbjorn Zetterlund; 2 960 (6.67%)	Kristin Monster; 370 (0.83%)	Heath Thomas (Libert); 477 (1.08%); Charles R. Sutherland (Ind); 119 (0.27%)	David Zimmer
York Centre	Monte Kwinter; 16 646 (48.73%)	Igor Toutchinski; 11 028 (32.28%)	Claudia Rodriguez; 3 713 (10.87%)	Marija Minic; Wikinews interview 2 207 (6.46%)	Marilyn Carvalho; 568 (1.66%)		Monte Kwinter

==== Toronto South Region ====
Electoral district	Candidates						Incumbent
Electoral district	Liberal	PC	NDP	Green	Family Coalition	Other	Incumbent
Beaches— East York	Tom Teahen; 10 215 (25.84%)	Don Duvall; 6 186 (15.59%)	Michael Prue; 17 522 (44.32%)	Caroline Law; 4 785 (12.10%)	Joel Kidd; 201 (0.51%)	Doug Patfield (Libert); 515 (1.30%); James Whittaker (Freedom); 135 (0.34%)	Michael Prue
Davenport	Tony Ruprecht; 12 467 (41.82%)	Antonio Garcia; 2 805 (9.41%)	Peter Ferreira; 10 880 (36.49%)	Frank De Jong; 3 047 (10.22%)	Gustavo Valdez; 157 (0.53%)	David McKee (Comm.); 191 (0.64%); Nunzio Venuto (Libert); 152 (0.51%); Anette Kouri (Ind [Comm League]); 114 (0.38%)	Tony Ruprecht
St. Paul's	Michael Bryant; 21 280 (47.43%)	Lillyann Goldstein; 11 910 (26.54%)	Julian Heller; 7 061 (15.74%)	Steve D'sa; 3 744 (8.34%)	Blaise Thompson; Wikinews interview 199 (0.42%)	Charles De Kerckhove (Ind); 328 (0.73%); John Kittredge (Libert); 240 (0.53%); Carol Leborg (Freedom); 115 (0.26%)	Michael Bryant
Toronto Centre	George Smitherman; 21 522 (47.85%)	Pamela Taylor; 9 084 (20.20%)	Sandra Gonzalez; 8 464 (18.82%)	Mike McLean; 4 412 (9.81%)		Michael Green (Libert); 686 (1.53%); Danish Ahmed (PFPWSN); 259 (0.58%); Johan Boyden (Comm.)(Wikinews interview); 196 (0.44%); Philip Fernandez (Ind [M-L]); 191 (0.42%); Gary Leroux (Ind); 167 (0.37%)	George Smitherman
Toronto— Danforth	Joyce Rowlands; 11 448 (29.20%)	Robert Bisbicis; 4 423 (11.28%)	Peter Tabuns; 17 975 (45.85%)	Patrick Kraemer; 4 372 (11.15%)	Micheal Kidd; 273 (0.70%)	Mark Scott (Libert); Wikinews interview 460 (1.17%); Shona Bracken (Comm.); Wikinews interview 253 (0.65%)	Peter Tabuns
Trinity— Spadina	Kathryn Holloway; 14 180 (31.53%)	Tyler Currie; 6 235 (13.86%)	Rosario Marchese; 18 508 (41.15%)	Dan King; 5 156 (11.46%)		George Sawision (Ind); 350 (0.78%); John Rubino (PFPWSN); 243 (0.54%); Charlene Cottle (Ind); 154 (0.34%); Silvio Ursomarzo (Freedom); 147 (0.33%)	Rosario Marchese

==== Toronto West Region ====
Electoral district	Candidates						Incumbent
Electoral district	Liberal	PC	NDP	Green	Family Coalition	Other	Incumbent
Etobicoke Centre	Donna Cansfield; 22 939 (50.07%)	Andrew Pringle; 15 667 (34.20%)	Anita Agrawal; 3 847 (8.40%)	Greg King; 3 357 (7.33%)			Donna Cansfield
Etobicoke— Lakeshore	Laurel Broten; 20 218 (45.99%)	Tom Barlow; 13 482 (30.67%)	Andrea Németh; 5 837 (13.28%)	Jerry Schulman; 3 467 (7.89%)	Bob Williams; 480 (1.09%)	Janice Murray (Ind [M-L]); 478 (1.09%)	Laurel Broten
Etobicoke North	Shafiq Qaadri; 15 147 (54.85%)	Mohamed Kassim; 5 801 (21.01%)	Mohamed Boudjenane; 4 101 (14.85%)	Jama Korshel; 1 312 (4.75%)	Theresa Ceolin; 1 255 (4.54%)		Shafiq Qaadri
Parkdale— High Park	Sylvia Watson; 11 900 (29.24%)	David Hutcheon; 6 024 (14.80%)	Cheri DiNovo; 18 194 (44.71%)	Bruce Hearns; 3 938 (9.68%)	Marilee Kidd; 312 (0.77%)	Zork Hun (Libert); 326 (0.80%)	Cheri DiNovo
York South— Weston	Laura Albanese; 13 846 (42.94%)	Karen McMillan; 3 173 (9.84%)	Paul Ferreira; 13 394 (41.54%)	Anthony Gratl; 1 226 (3.80%)	Mariangela Sanabria; 218 (0.68%)	Marco Dias (Libert); 385 (1.19%)	Paul Ferreira
York West	Mario Sergio; 13 246 (54.74%)	Shane O'Toole; 2 484 (10.26%)	Antoni Shelton; 6 764 (27.95%)	Sergio Pagnotta; 1 199 (4.95%)	Julia Carvalho; 282 (1.17%)	Ram Narula (Ind.); 225 (0.93%)	Mario Sergio

=== Brampton, Mississauga and Oakville ===
Electoral district	Candidates						Incumbent
Electoral district	Liberal	PC	NDP	Green	Family Coalition	Other	Incumbent
Bramalea— Gore— Malton	Kuldip Kular; 19 106 (47.00%)	Pam Hundal; 11 934 (29.36%)	Glenn Crowe; 5 016 (12.34%)	Bruce Haines; Wikinews interview 4 120 (10.14%)	Gary Nail; 471 (1.16%)		Kuldip Kular
Brampton— Springdale	Linda Jeffrey; 17 673 (50.66%)	John Carman McClelland; 10 708 (30.70%)	Mani Singh; 3 800 (10.89%)	Daniel Cullen; 2 292 (6.57%)	Sandy Toteda; 258 (0.74%)	Elizabeth Rowley (Comm.); 152 (0.44%)	Linda Jeffrey
Brampton West	Vic Dhillon; 20 746 (46.19%)	Mark Beckles; 15 120 (33.67%)	Garth Bobb; 4 901 (10.91%)	Sanjeev Goel; 3 471 (7.73%)	Norah Madden; 488 (1.09%)	Gurdial Singh Fiji (Ind); 185 (0.41%)	Vic Dhillon
Mississauga— Brampton South	Amrit Mangat; 19 738 (53.78%)	Ravi Singh; 9 333 (25.43%)	Karan Pandher; 3 785 (10.31%)	Paul Simas; 3 846 (10.48%)			new district
Mississauga East— Cooksville	Peter Fonseca; 22 249 (58.93%)	Zoran Churchin; 8 715 (23.08%)	Sathish Balasunderam; 3 192 (8.46%)	Carla Casanova; 2 361 (6.25%)	Al Zawadski; 992 (2.63%)	Ryan Jamieson (Freedom); 243 (0.64%)	Peter Fonseca
Mississauga— Erindale	Harinder Takhar; 21 551 (47.85%)	David Brown; 14 913 (33.11%)	Shaila Kibria; 5 056 (11.23%)	Richard Pietro; 3 521 (7.82%)			Harinder Takhar
Mississauga South	Charles Sousa; 19 195 (46.68%)	Tim Peterson; 14 187 (34.50%)	Ken Cole; 3 745 (9.11%)	David Johnston; 3 629 (8.83%)	Samantha Toteda; 365 (0.89%)		Tim Peterson
Mississauga— Streetsville	Bob Delaney; 20 264 (52.55%)	Nina Tangri; 11 155 (28.93%)	Gail McCabe; 3 944 (10.23%)	Scott Warner; 2 925 (7.59%)	Masood Atchekzai; 274 (0.71%)		Bob Delaney
Oakville	Kevin Flynn; 23 761 (49.81%)	Rick Byers; 16 659 (34.92%)	Tony Crawford; 3 091 (6.48%)	Marion Schaffer; Wikinews interview 3 916 (8.21%)	Micheal Toteda; 279 (0.58%)		Kevin Flynn

=== Hamilton, Burlington and Niagara ===
Electoral district	Candidates						Incumbent
Electoral district	Liberal	PC	NDP	Green	Family Coalition	Other	Incumbent
Ancaster— Dundas— Flamborough— Westdale	Ted McMeekin; 20 445 (41.16%)	Chris Corrigan; 17 092 (34.41%)	Juanita Maldonado; 6 814 (13.72%)	David Januczkowski; 4 112 (8.28%)	Jim Enos; 548 (1.10%)	Eileen Butson (Cor); 370 (0.74%); Martin Samuel Zuliniak (Ind); 222 (0.45%) Sam Zaslavsky (Libert); 67 (0.13%)	Ted McMeekin
Burlington	Marianne Meed Ward; 19 734 (37.79%)	Joyce Savoline; 21 578 (41.34%)	Cory Judson; 5 728 (10.97%)	Tim Wilson; 4 779 (9.16%)	Mark Gamez; 391 (0.75%)		Joyce Savoline
Halton	Gary Zemlak; 22 501 (41.51%)	Ted Chudleigh; 22 667 (41.84%)	Patricia Heroux; 4 160 (7.68%)	Andrew Chlobowski; 4 376 (8.07%)	Stan Lazarski; 487 (0.90%)		Ted Chudleigh
Hamilton Centre	Steve Ruddick; 11 096 (28.89%)	Chris Robertson; 5 673 (14.77%)	Andrea Horwath; 17 176 (44.72%)	Peter Ormond; Wikinews interview 3 610 (9.40%)	Lynne Scime; 550 (1.43%)	Bob Mann (Comm.); 302 (0.79%)	Andrea Horwath
Hamilton Centre	Steve Ruddick; 11 096 (28.89%)	Chris Robertson; 5 673 (14.77%)	Andrea Horwath; 17 176 (44.72%)	Peter Ormond; Wikinews interview 3 610 (9.40%)	Lynne Scime; 550 (1.43%)	Bob Mann (Comm.); 302 (0.79%)	merged district
Hamilton Centre	Steve Ruddick; 11 096 (28.89%)	Chris Robertson; 5 673 (14.77%)	Andrea Horwath; 17 176 (44.72%)	Peter Ormond; Wikinews interview 3 610 (9.40%)	Lynne Scime; 550 (1.43%)	Bob Mann (Comm.); 302 (0.79%)	Judy Marsales†
Hamilton East— Stoney Creek	Nerene Virgin; 15 062 (34.85%)	Tara Crugnale; 9 310 (21.54%)	Paul Miller; 16 272 (37.65%)	Ray Dartsch; 2 122 (4.91%)	Bob Innes; 452 (1.05%)		Jennifer Mossop†
Hamilton Mountain	Sophia Aggelonitis; 17 387 (37.24%)	Bob Charters; 10 982 (23.52%)	Bryan Adamczyk; 15 653 (33.53%)	Ivan Miletic; 2 172 (4.65%)	Mary Maan; 493 (1.06%)		Marie Bountrogianni†
Niagara Falls	Kim Craitor; 22 210 (47.53%)	Bart Maves; 14 540 (31.12%)	Mike Piché; 4 605 (9.85%)	Melanie Mullen; 5 373 (11.50%)			Kim Craitor
Niagara West— Glanbrook	Mike Lostracco; 14 290 (30.01%)	Tim Hudak; 24 311 (51.06%)	Bonnie Bryan; 5 809 (12.20%)	Sid Frere; 3 206 (6.73%)			Tim Hudak
St. Catharines	Jim Bradley; 21 029 (47.23%)	Bruce Timms; 12 864 (28.89%)	Henry Bosch; 7 069 (15.88%)	Byrne Smith; 3 152 ((7.08%)	Barra Gots; 267 (0.60%)	Sam Hammond (Comm.); 139 (0.31%)	Jim Bradley
Welland	John Mastroianni; 10 580 (22.91%)	Ron Bodner; 8 722 (18.88%)	Peter Kormos; 24 910 (53.94%)	Mark Grenier (Wikinews interview); 1 973 (4.27%)			Peter Kormos

=== Midwestern Ontario ===
Electoral district	Candidates						Incumbent
Electoral district	Liberal	PC	NDP	Green	Family Coalition	Other	Incumbent
Brant	Dave Levac; 23 485 (49.16%)	Dan McCreary; 13 787 (28.86%)	Brian Van Tilborg; 6 536 (13.68%)	Ted Shelegy; 3 272 (6.85%)	Rob Ferguson; 403 (0.84%)	John Turmel (Ind); 289 (0.60%)	Dave Levac
Cambridge	Kathryn McGarry; 14 704 (34.17%)	Gerry Martiniuk; 17 942 (41.70%)	Mitchell Healey; 5 896 (13.70%)	Colin Carmichael; 3 842 (8.93%)	Paul Vandervet; 646 (1.50%)		Gerry Martiniuk
Guelph	Liz Sandals; 20 346 (40.92%)	Bob Senechal; 12 180 (24.49%)	Karan Mann-Bowers; 6 880 (13.84%)	Ben Polley; 9 750 (19.61%)	John Gots; 405 (0.81%)	Drew Garvie (Comm.); 166 (0.33%)	Liz Sandals
Haldimand— Norfolk	Lorraine Bergstrand; 9 536 (22.23%)	Toby Barrett; 26 135 (60.92%)	Jan Watson; 4 546 (10.60%)	Chad Squizzado; 2 230 (5.20%)	Steve Elgersma; 457 (1.07%)		Toby Barrett
Huron— Bruce	Carol Mitchell; 20 469 (45.95%)	Rob Morley; 13 606 (30.54%)	Paul Klopp; 5 932 (13.32%)	Victoria Serda; 2 911 (6.53%)	Dave Joslin; 1 035 (2.32%)	Dennis Valenta (Ind); 393 (0.88%); Ronald John Stephens (Ind); 202 (0.45%)	Carol Mitchell
Kitchener Centre	John Milloy; 17 484 (45.90%)	Matt Stanson; 9 717 (25.51%)	Rick Moffitt; 6 707 (17.61%)	Daniel Logan; 3 162 (8.30%)	Bill Bernhardt; 599 (1.57%)	J.D. McGuire (Ind); 425 (1.12%)	John Milloy
Kitchener— Conestoga	Leeanna Pendergast; 16 315 (41.82%)	Michael Harris; 14 450 (37.04%)	Mark Cairns; 4 545 (11.65%)	Colin Jones; 2 805 (7.19%)	Len Solomon; 510 (1.31%)	Larry Stevens (Libert); 246 (0.63%); David Driver (Freedom); 145 (0.37%)	new district
Kitchener— Waterloo	Louise Ervin; 15 848 (31.20%)	Elizabeth Witmer; 20 748 (40.84%)	Catherine Fife; 8 902 (17.52%)	Judy Greenwood-Speers; 4 707 (9.27%)	Lou Reitzel; 598 (1.18%)		Elizabeth Witmer
Oxford	Brian Jackson; 11 455 (29.36%)	Ernie Hardeman; 18 445 (47.27%)	Michael Comeau; 4 421 (11.33%)	Tom Mayberry; 3 441 (8.82%)	Leonard VanderHoeven; 601 (1.54%)	Jim Bender (Ind); 659 (1.69%)	Ernie Hardeman
Perth— Wellington	John Wilkinson; 18 096 (46.65%)	John Rutherford; 12 338 (31.81%)	Donna Hansen; 3 912 (10.09%)	Anita Payne; 3 051 (7.87%)	Pat Bannon; 776 (2.00%)	Rob Smink (Freedom); 399 (1.03%); Kevin Allman (Ind); 217 (0.56%)	John Wilkinson
Wellington— Halton Hills	Marg Bentley; 13 312 (30.39%)	Ted Arnott; 21 533 (49.16%)	Noel Duignan; 3 914 (8.94%)	Martin Lavictoire; 4 489 (10.25%)	Giuseppe Gori; 555 (1.27%)		Ted Arnott

=== Southwestern Ontario ===
Electoral district	Candidates						Incumbent
Electoral district	Liberal	PC	NDP	Green	Family Coalition	Other	Incumbent
Chatham-Kent— Essex	Pat Hoy; 18 782 (51.98%)	Doug Jackson; 10 367 (28.69%)	Murray Gaudreau; 4 601 (12.73%)	Ken Bell; 2 054 (5.69%)	Mark Morin (Wikinews interview); 326 (0.90%)		Pat Hoy
Elgin— Middlesex— London	Steve Peters; 20 085 (49.10%)	Bill Fehr; 12 460 (30.5%)	Brad James; 4 643 (11.46%)	Devin Kelly; 3 363 (8.22%)		Ray Monteith (Freedom); 353 (0.86%)	Steve Peters
Essex	Bruce Crozier; 19 970 (48.02%)	Richard Kniaziew; 10 400 (25.01)%)	John Grima; 8 638 (20.77%)	Jessica Fracassi; 2 220 (5.34%)		Aaron Parent (Libert); 358 (0.86%)	Bruce Crozier
Lambton— Kent— Middlesex	Maria Van Bommel; 18 228 (43.2%)	Monte McNaughton; 15 295 (36.27%)	Joyce Joliffe; 4 520 (10.73%)	James Armstrong; 3 329 (7.90%)	Bill McMaster (Wikinews interview); 549 (1.30%)	Brad Harness (Reform); 209 (0.50%)	Maria Van Bommel
London North Centre	Deb Matthews; 21 669 (47.17%)	Rob Alder; 10 897 (23.72%)	Stephen Holmes; 7 649 (16.65%)	Brett McKenzie; 5 720 (12.45%)			Deb Matthews
London— Fanshawe	Khalil Ramal; 13 742 (38.68%)	Jim Chapman (Wikinews interview); 9 760 (27.5%)	Stephen Maynard; 9 350 (26.32%)	Daniel O'Neail; 2 548 (7.17%)		Ma'in Sinan (Ind); 129 (0.36%)	Khalil Ramal
London West	Chris Bentley; 25 967 (52.42%)	Allison Graham; 12 011 (24.25%)	Paul Pighin; 5 562 (11.23%)	Gary Brown; 5 184 (10.47%)	Andrew Jezierski; 267 (0.54%)	Paul McKeever (Freedom); 234 (0.47%); Mike Reynolds (Ind); 201 (0.41%); Chris Gupta (Republican); 106 (0.21%)	Chris Bentley
Sarnia— Lambton	Caroline Di Cocco; 12 443 (29.41%)	Bob Bailey; 16 145 (38.16%)	Barb Millitt; 11 349 (26.82%)	Tim von Bodegom; 2 376 (5.62%)			Caroline Di Cocco
Windsor— Tecumseh	Dwight Duncan; 17 894 (50.19%)	Kristine Robinson; 6 106 (16.84%)	Helmi Charif; 8 836 (24.36%)	Andrew McAvoy (Wikinews interview); 2 696 (7.43%)	John Curtin; 735 (2.03%)		Dwight Duncan
Windsor West	Sandra Pupatello; 16 821 (50.19%)	Lisa Lumley; 5 652 (16.86%)	Mariano Klimowicz; 8 604 (25.67%)	Jason Haney; 1 974 (5.89%)	Daniel Dionne; 463 (1.38%)		Sandra Pupatello

=== Northern Ontario ===
Electoral district	Candidates						Incumbent
Electoral district	Liberal	PC	NDP	Green	Family Coalition	Other	Incumbent
Algoma— Manitoulin	Mike Brown; 11 361 (42.56%)	Ronald Swain; 3 744 (14.02%)	Peter Denley; 9 863 (36.95%)	Ron Yurick; 1 374 (5.15%)	Ray Scott; 354 (1.33%)		Mike Brown
Kenora— Rainy River	Mike Wood; 5 752 (24.42%)	Penny Lucas (Wikinews interview); 2 757 (11.70%)	Howard Hampton; 14 281 (60.62%)	Jo Jo Holiday; 769 (3.26%)			Howard Hampton
Nickel Belt	Ron Dupuis; 12 364 (38.08%)	Renée Germain; 3 263 (10.05%)	France Gélinas; 15 126 (46.59%)	Fred Twilley; 1 374 (4.23%)	Richard St. Denis; 341 (1.05%)		Shelley Martel†
Nipissing	Monique Smith; 13 781 (42.11%)	Bill Vrebosch; 13 323 (40.71%)	Henri Giroux; 4 136 (12.64%)	Amy Brownridge; 1 248 (3.81%)	Suzanne Plouffe; 238 (0.73%)		Monique Smith
Parry Sound— Muskoka	Brenda Rhodes; 9 819 (26.73%)	Norm Miller; 17 348 (47.22%)	Sara Hall; 5 015 (13.65%)	Matt Richter; 4 557 (12.40%)			Norm Miller
Sault Ste. Marie	David Orazietti; 19 316 (60.13%)	Josh Pringle; 2 349 (7.31%)	Jeff Arbus; 8 475 (26.38%)	Andre Reopel; 1 377 (4.29%)	Bil Murphy; 605 (1.88%)		David Orazietti
Sudbury	Rick Bartolucci; 19 307 (58.77%)	Louis Delongchamp; 2 605 (7.93%)	Dave Battaino; 8 914 (27.13%)	David Sylvester; 1 608 (4.89%)	Carita Murphy- Marketos; 293 (0.89%)	J. David Popescu (Ind); 124 (0.38%)	Rick Bartolucci
Thunder Bay— Atikokan	Bill Mauro; 10 928 (37.69%)	Rebecca Johnson; 5 918 (20.41%)	John Rafferty; 10 878 (37.52%)	Russ Aegard (Wikinews interview); 1 270 (4.38%)			Bill Mauro
Thunder Bay— Superior North	Michael Gravelle; 13 373 (46.78%)	Scott Hobbs; 2 688 (9.40%)	Jim Foulds; 10 938 (38.26%)	Dawn Kannegiesser; 1 586 (5.55%)			Michael Gravelle
Timiskaming— Cochrane	David Ramsay; 11 588 (42.90%)	Doug Shearer; 3 659 (13.55%)	John Vanthof; 10 954 (40.55%)	Patrick East; 811 (3.00%)			David Ramsay
Timmins— James Bay	Pat Boucher; 9 729 (38.10%)	Steve Kidd; 2 191 (8.58%)	Gilles Bisson; 13 176 (51.60%)	Larry Verner; 437 (1.71%)			Gilles Bisson
