= Results of the 2011 Ontario general election by riding =

- October 6, 2011

The 2011 Ontario general election took place on Thursday, October 6, 2011 to elect members of the Legislative Assembly of Ontario, Canada.

== Candidates and results ==
Candidates' names are as registered with Elections Ontario.
Vote totals are those validated by Elections Ontario; media coverage is usually based on preliminary totals and often differs from the final numbers.
† = not seeking re-election
‡ = running for re-election in different riding
§ = represents that the incumbent was refused nomination by their party
$ = represents that the incumbent was announced as nominated by their party but later chose to retire
# = represents that the incumbent was announced as nominated by their party but later lost that party's nomination through expulsion from caucus
bold indicates party leader

=== Ottawa ===
Electoral district	Candidates					Incumbent
Electoral district	Liberal	PC	NDP	Green	Other	Incumbent
Carleton— Mississippi Mills	Megan Cornell 19,144 (34.08%)	Jack MacLaren 28,246 (50.29%)	Liam Duff 6,371 (11.34%)	Scott Simser 1,857 (3.31%)	Cynthia Bredfeldt (FCP) 549 (0.98%)	Norm Sterling†
Nepean—Carleton	Don Dransfield 14,844 (26.97%)	Lisa MacLeod 29,984 (54.48%)	Ric Dagenais 8,127 (14.77%)	Gordon Kubanek 1,641 (2.98%)	Roger Toutant (Libertarian) 223 (0.41%); Marco Rossi (FPO) 217 (0.39%)	Lisa MacLeod
Ottawa Centre	Yasir Naqvi 23,646 (46.81%)	Rob Dekker 9,257 (18.33%)	Anil Naidoo 14,715 (29.13%)	Kevin O'Donnell 2,184 (4.32%)	Stuart Ryan (Communist) 160 (0.32%); Kristina Chapman (Ind) 309 (0.61%); Michal Zeithammel (Libertarian) 240 (0.48%)	Yasir Naqvi
Ottawa—Orléans	Phil McNeely 21,857 (46.44%)	Andrew Lister 19,003 (40.38%)	Doug McKercher 4,979 (10.58%)	Tanya Gutmanis 886 (1.88%)	David Paul (Libertarian) 154 (0.33%); David McGruer (FPO) 183 (0.39%)	Phil McNeely
Ottawa South	**Dalton McGuinty** 21,842 (49.12%)	Jason MacDonald 14,945 (33.61%)	Wali Farah 5,988 (13.47%)	James Mihaychuk 1,442 (3.24%)	Jean-Serge Brisson (Libertarian) 252 (0.57%); John Redins (PSN) 238 (0.54%)	Dalton McGuinty
Ottawa— Vanier	Madeleine Meilleur 19,619 (51.29%)	Fred Sherman 8,929 (23.35%)	Paul Étienne Laliberté-Tipple 7,466 (19.52%)	Dave Bagler 1,719 (4.49%)	Emmanuel Houle (FCP)352 (0.92%)	Madeleine Meilleur
Ottawa West— Nepean	Bob Chiarelli 18,492 (41.46)	Randall Denley 17,483 (39.19%)	Wendy Byrne 6,576 (14.74%)	Alex Hill 1,485 (3.33%)	John Pacheco (FCP) 396 (0.89%)	Bob Chiarelli

=== Eastern Ontario ===
Electoral district	Candidates					Incumbent
Electoral district	Liberal	PC	NDP	Green	Other	Incumbent
Glengarry— Prescott— Russell	Grant Crack; 17,345 (42.89%)	Marilissa Gosselin; 15,973 (39.50%)	Bonnie Jean-Louis; 5,721 (15.15%)	Taylor Howarth; 770 (1.90%)	Phil Miller (Libertarian); 199 (0.49%); Carl Leduc (FPO); 164 (0.41%)	Jean-Marc Lalonde†
Kingston and the Islands	John Gerretsen; 21,028 (48.66%)	Rodger James; 9,610 (22.24%)	Mary Rita Holland; 10,241 (23.70%)	Robert Kiley; 1,594 (3.69%)	Jamie Shaw (Libertarian); 115 (0.27%); David Best (PFRP); 56 (0.13%); Paul Busch (FPO); 71 (0.16%); David Caracciolo (FCP); 336 (0.78%)	John Gerretsen
Lanark— Frontenac— Lennox and Addington	Bill MacDonald; 12,490 (27.78%)	Randy Hillier; 22,457 (49.95%)	Dave Parkhill; 8,104 (18.02%)	Nancy Matte; 1,754 (3.90%)		Randy Hillier
Leeds— Grenville	Ray Heffernan; 6,663 (17.36%)	Steve Clark; 24,314 (63.34%)	David Lundy; 5,822 (15.17%)	Charlie Taylor; 1,319 (3.45%)	Lance Fulsom (Socialist); 111 (0.29%)	Steve Clark
Prince Edward— Hastings	Leona Dombrowsky; 15,686 (35.13%)	Todd Smith; 18,816 (42.13%)	Sherry Hayes; 7,379 (16.52%)	Treat Hull; 2,049 (4.59%)	Neal Ford (FCP); 257 (0.58%); **Trueman Tuck** (PFRP); 115 (0.26%); Andrew Skinner (Libertarian); 201 (0.45%)	Leona Dombrowsky
Renfrew— Nipissing— Pembroke	John O'Leary; 6,231 (15.94%)	John Yakabuski; 27,594 (70.58%)	Brian Dougherty; 4,277 (10.94%)	Kyle Jones; 574 (1.47%)	Murray Reid (COR); 309 (0.79%)	John Yakabuski
Stormont— Dundas— South Glengarry	Mark MacDonald; 8,413 (21.54%)	Jim McDonell; 21,463 (54.96%)	Elaine MacDonald; 8,021 (20.54%)	Justin Reist; 551 (1.41%)	Darcy Neal Donnelly (Libertarian); 396 (1.01%)	Jim Brownell†

=== Central Ontario ===
Electoral district	Candidates					Incumbent
Electoral district	Liberal	PC	NDP	Green	Other	Incumbent
Barrie	Karl Walsh 15,006 (34.66%)	Rod Jackson 17,527 (40.49%)	Myrna Clark 8,171 (18.87%)	Andrew Miller 1,909 (4.41%)	Matthew MacKenzie (FPO) 179 (0.41%); Darren Roskam (Libertarian) 318 (0.73%)	Aileen Carroll†
Bruce— Grey— Owen Sound	Kevin Eccles 10,889 (26.26%)	Bill Walker 19,567 (47.18%)	Paul Johnstone 6,133 (14.79%)	Don Marshall 2,654 (6.40%)	Jay Miller (Libertarian) 246 (0.59%); Shane Jolley (Ind) 1,478 (3.56%); Joel Kidd (FCP) 339 (0.82%)	Bill Murdoch†
Dufferin— Caledon	Lori Holloway 10,162 (26.64%)	Sylvia Jones 17,833 (46.74%)	Karen Gventer 4,200 (11.01%)	Rob Strang 5,540 (14.52%)	Daniel Kowalewski (Libertarian) 250 (0.66%)	Sylvia Jones
Durham	Betty Somerville 13,394 (29.24%)	John O'Toole 22,393 (48.89%)	James Terry 8,027 (17.52%)	Edward Yaghledjian 1,221 (2.67%)	David Strutt (FPO) 172 (0.38%); Blaize Barnicoat (Libertarian) 424 (0.93%)	John O'Toole
Haliburton— Kawartha Lakes— Brock	Rick Johnson 16,522 (33.45%)	Laurie Scott 22,352 (45.26%)	Don Abel 8,517 (17.25%)	Anita Payne 1,562 (3.16%)	Charles Olito (FPO) 245 (0.50%)	Rick Johnson
Newmarket— Aurora	Christina Bisanz 16,154 (35.50%)	Frank Klees 21,425 (47.09%)	Robin Wardlaw 6,514 (14.32%)	Kristopher Kuysten 1,256 (2.76%)		Frank Klees
Northumberland— Quinte West	Lou Rinaldi 18,572 (38.20%)	Rob Milligan 19,279 (39.65%)	Kira Mees 8,589 (17.67%)	Judy Smith Torrie 1,483 (3.05%)	Jeffrey McLarty (Libertarian) 357 (0.73%); Richard Martin Rieger (Ind) 159 (0.33%)	Lou Rinaldi
Peterborough	Jeff Leal 19,430 (39.75%)	Alan Wilson 15,323 (31.35%)	Dave Nickle 12,460 (25.49%)	Gary Beamish 1,235 (2.53%)	Ken Ranney (Socialist) 83 (0.17%); Alex Long (FPO) 127 (0.26%)	Jeff Leal
Simcoe—Grey	Donna Kenwell 10,404 (22.23%)	Jim Wilson 25,339 (54.14%)	David Matthews 6,839 (14.61%)	**Mike Schreiner** 4,057 (8.67%)		Jim Wilson
Simcoe North	Fred Larsen 10,191 (22.34%)	Garfield Dunlop 25,081 (54.99%)	Doris Middleton 7,710 (16.90%)	Peter Stubbins 2,488 (5.45%)		Garfield Dunlop
York—Simcoe	Gloria Reszler 9,496 (24.42%)	Julia Munro 20,425 (52.53%)	Megan Tay 6,607 (16.99%)	Meade Helman 1,479 (3.80%)	Mark Harrison (FPO) 201 (0.52%); Craig Hodgins (Libertarian) 489 (1.26%)	Julia Munro

=== Southern Durham & York ===
Electoral district	Candidates					Incumbent
Electoral district	Liberal	PC	NDP	Green	Other	Incumbent
Ajax— Pickering	Joe Dickson 19,606 (47.14%)	Todd McCarthy 14,718 (35.39%)	Evan Wiseman 5,952 (14.31%)	Steven Toman 843 (2.03%)	Andrew Delis (Libertarian) 299 (0.72%)	Joe Dickson
Markham— Unionville	Michael Chan 19,579 (52.18%)	Shan Thayaparan 11,720 (31.24%)	P. C. Choo 4,575 (12.19%)	Myles O'Brien 1,104 (2.94%)	Allen Small (Libertarian) 259 (0.69%)	Michael Chan
Oak Ridges— Markham	Helena Jaczek 28,878 (44.51%)	Farid Wassef 23,950 (36.91%)	Joe Whitfeld 8,548 (13.17%)	Trifon Haitas 1,569 (2.42%)	Karl Boelling (Libertarian) 1,057 (1.63%); Ruida Lu (Ind) 484 (0.75%)	Helena Jaczek
Oshawa	Jacquie Menezes 6,921 (17.42%)	Jerry Ouellette 16,719 (42.08%)	Mike Shields 14,316 (36.03%)	Stacey Leadbetter 1,035 (2.60%)	Ben Fudge (FPO) 147 (0.37%); Matthew Belanger (Libertarian) 435 (1.09%)	Jerry Ouellette
Pickering— Scarborough East	Tracy MacCharles 18,201 (46.46%)	Kevin Gaudet 13,033 (33.27%)	Nerissa Cariño 6,424 (16.40%)	Kevin Smith 1,096 (2.80%)	Heath Thomas (Libertarian) 252 (0.64%)	Wayne Arthurs†
Richmond Hill	Reza Moridi 18,042 (46.66%)	Vic Gupta 13,763 (35.59%)	Adam DeVita 4,987 (12.90%)	Brian Chamberlain 1,268 (3.28%)	Tamas Demjen (Libertarian) 394 (1.02%)	Reza Moridi
Thornhill	Bernie Farber 18,373 (40.71%)	Peter Shurman 20,971 (46.46%)	Cindy Hackelberg 4,024 (8.92%)	Stephanie Duncan 756 (1.67%)	Gene Balfour (Libertarian) 623 (1.38%); Erin Gorman (FPO) 149 (0.33%)	Peter Shurman
Vaughan	Greg Sorbara 26,174 (53.44%)	Tony Genco 15,420 (31.48%)	Paul Donofrio 5,594 (11.42%)	Brendan Frye 694 (1.42%)	David Natale (Reform) 218 (0.45%); Savino Quatela (Ind) 169 (0.35%); Paolo Fabrizio (Libertarian) 929 (1.9%); Terry Marino (COR) 169 (0.35%)	Greg Sorbara
Whitby— Oshawa	Elizabeth Roy 16,988 (33.30%)	Christine Elliott 24,499 (48.02%)	Maret Sadem-Thompson 7,865 (15.42%)	Bradley Gibson 1,139 (2.23%)	Douglas Thom (FPO) 160 (0.31%); Dan King (PSN) 211 (0.41%)	Christine Elliott

=== Toronto ===
==== Scarborough ====
Electoral district	Candidates					Incumbent
Electoral district	Liberal	PC	NDP	Green	Other	Incumbent
Scarborough— Agincourt	Soo Wong 14,907 (47.16%)	Liang Chen 10,222 (32.34%)	Paul Choi 5,017 (15.87%)	Pauline Thompson 722 (2.28%)	Priya Ahuja (Paramount) 209 (0.66%); Sabrina Wall (FPO) 83 (0.26%); Doug McLarty (Libertarian) 656 (2.08%)	Gerry Phillips†
Scarborough Centre	Brad Duguid 16,142 (51.13%)	Carol Williams 7,511 (23.79%)	Kathleen Mathurin 6,876 (21.78%)	Jeff Mole 558 (1.77%)	David Driver (FPO) 301 (0.95%)	Brad Duguid
Scarborough— Guildwood	Margarett Best 15,607 (48.59%)	Gary Ellis 9,137 (28.45%)	Lorri Urban 6,194 (19.29%)	Naoshad Pochkhanawala 413 (1.29%)	**Sam Apelbaum** (Libertarian) 407 (1.27%); Matthew Oliver (FPO) 136 (0.42%)	Margarett Best
Scarborough— Rouge River	Bas Balkissoon 15,237 (41.63%)	Ken Kim 6,837 (18.68%)	Neethan Shan 13,088 (35.75%)	George Singh 455 (1.24%)	Felix Liao (Libertarian) 457 (1.25%); Daniel Walker (FPO) 150 (0.41%); Raphael Rosch (FCP) 166 (0.45%)	Bas Balkissoon
Scarborough Southwest	Lorenzo Berardinetti 14,585 (43.89%)	Mike Chopowick 7,061 (21.25%)	Bruce Budd 10,404 (31.31%)	Robin McKim 777 (2.41%)	Caroline Blanco-Ruibal (FPO) 250 (0.75%)	Lorenzo Berardinetti

==== Toronto North Region ====
Electoral district	Candidates					Incumbent
Electoral district	Liberal	PC	NDP	Green	Other	Incumbent
Don Valley East	Michael Coteau 16,350 (50.80%)	Michael Lende 8,705 (27.05%)	Bob Hilliard 5,953 (18.50%)	Aren Bedrosyan 702 (2.18%)	Wayne Simmons (FPO) 113 (0.35%); Ryan Kidd (FCP) 187 (0.58%)	David Caplan†
Don Valley West	Kathleen Wynne 24,444 (58.15%)	Andrea Mandel-Campbell 12,827 (30.52%)	Khalid Ahmed 3,621 (8.61%)	Louis Fliss 718 (1.71%)	Soumen Deb (FPO) 74 (0.18%); Dimitris Kabitsis (Communist) 125 (0.30%); Rosemary Waigh (Vegan) 108 (0.26%)	Kathleen Wynne
Eglinton—Lawrence	Mike Colle 20,752 (53.91%)	Rocco Rossi 12,857 (33.40%)	Gerti Dervishi 3,763 (9.78%)	Josh Rachlis 575 (1.49%)	Sujith Reddy (PSN) 79 (0.21%); Michael Bone (FPO) 152 (0.39%); Jerry Green (Ind) 146 (0.38%)	Mike Colle
Willowdale	David Zimmer 21,984 (50.61%)	Vince Agovino 14,528 (33.44%)	Alexander Brown 5,556 (12.79%)	Michael Vettese 874 (2.01%)	Amy Brown (FPO) 297 (0.68%)	David Zimmer
York Centre	Monte Kwinter 14,694 (44.91%)	Michael Mostyn 11,506 (35.17%)	John Fagan 4,579 (13.99%)	Yuriy Shevyryov 535 (1.64%)	Ron Tal (FPO) 108 (0.33%); David Epstein (Libertarian) 846 (2.59%); Jeff Pancer (Ind) 127 (0.39%)	Monte Kwinter

==== Toronto South Region ====
Electoral district	Candidates					Incumbent
Electoral district	Liberal	PC	NDP	Green	Other	Incumbent
Beaches— East York	Helen Burstyn 13,813 (35.93%)	Chris Menary 5,333 (13.87%)	Michael Prue 17,925 (46.62%)	Shawn Ali 1,025 (2.67%)	Naomi Poley-Fisher (FPO) 144 (0.37%); Joe Ross (TOP) 45 (0.12%)	Michael Prue
Davenport	Cristina Martins 12,953 (41.18%)	Kirk Russell 2,480 (7.88%)	Jonah Schein 14,367 (45.67%)	Frank de Jong 855 (2.72%)	Franz Cauchi (FPO) 96 (0.31%); Miguel Figueroa (Communist) 163 (0.52%); Kiros Ghiwot (TOP) 33 (0.10%); Mark Jagg (Ind) 250 (0.79%); Allix Thompson (PHR) 82 (0.26%)	Tony Ruprecht†
St. Paul's	Eric Hoskins 25,048 (58.18%)	Christine McGirr 8,972 (20.83%)	David Hynes 7,124 (16.54%)	Judith Van Veldhuysen 1,180 (2.74%)	Keith Pinto (Socialist) 83 (0.20%); Mike Rita (FPO) 86 (0.20%); John Kittredge (Libertarian) 335 (0.78%); David Vallance (NOHP) 69 (0.16%)	Eric Hoskins
Toronto Centre	Glen Murray 25,236 (54.60%)	Martin Abell 7,186 (15.55%)	Cathy Crowe 11,571 (25.03%)	Mark Daye 1,123 (2.43%)	Judi Falardeau (Libertarian) 441 (0.95%); Christopher Goodwin (FPO) 92 (0.20%); Cathy Holliday (Communist) 146 (0.32%); **Bahman Yazdanfar** (CCP) 19 (0.04%); Harvey Rotenberg (Vegan) 93 (0.20%); Phil Sarazen (People) 29 (0.06%)	Glen Murray
Toronto— Danforth	Marisa Sterling 11,369 (30.88%)	Rita Jethi 3,488 (9.47%)	Peter Tabuns 20,062 (54.49%)	Tim Whalley 1,354 (3.68%)	Stéphane Vera (FPO) 107 (0.29%); **Kevin Clarke** (People) 143 (0.39%); John Recker (Libertarian) 440 (1.2%); John Richardson (CCP) 75 (0.20%); Neil Mercer (TOP) 110 (0.3%)	Peter Tabuns
Trinity— Spadina	Sarah Thomson 18,731 (39.76%)	Mike Yen 5,420 (11.50%)	Rosario Marchese 19,870 (42.18%)	Tim Grant 2,415 (5.13%)	Guy Fogel (Socialist) 117 (0.25%); Silvio Ursomarzo (FPO) 126 (0.27%); **Danish Ahmed** (PSN) 139 (0.30%); Araba Ocran-Caesar (PHR) 88 (0.19%)	Rosario Marchese

==== Toronto West Region ====
Electoral district	Candidates					Incumbent
Electoral district	Liberal	PC	NDP	Green	Other	Incumbent
Etobicoke Centre	Donna Cansfield 21,916 (51.16%)	Mary Anne De Monte-Whelan 13,956 (32.58%)	Ana Maria Rivero 5,099 (11.90%)	Cheryll San Juan 837 (1.95%)	Alexander Bussmann (Libertarian) 422 (0.99%); Liz Millican (FCP) 231 (0.54%); Marco Renda (FPO) 108 (0.25%)	Donna Cansfield
Etobicoke— Lakeshore	Laurel Broten 22,169 (50.73%)	Simon Nyilassy 12,705 (29.07%)	Dionne Coley 6,713 (15.36%)	Angela Salewsky 1,164 (2.66%)	Mark Brombacher (FPO) 174 (0.40%); Natalie Lochwin (Socialist) 125 (0.29%); Hans Kunov (Libertarian) 172 (0.39%); John Letonja (Ind) 113 (0.26%); Thane MacKay (Ind) 113 (0.26%)	Laurel Broten
Etobicoke North	Shafiq Qaadri 12,081 (48.17%)	Karm Singh 6,072 (24.21%)	Vrind Sharma 5,426 (21.63%)	Gurleen Gill 541 (2.16%)	Gopal Baghel (Paramount) 100 (0.40%); Claudio Ceolin (FCP) 391 (1.56%); James McConnell (FPO) 320 (1.28%)	Shafiq Qaadri
Parkdale— High Park	Cortney Pasternak 14,877 (39.23%)	Joe Ganetakos 4,668 (11.68%)	Cheri DiNovo 18,365 (45.96%)	Justin Trottier 1,325 (3.32%)	Rod Rojas (Libertarian) 172 (0.43%); Istvan Tar (Ind) 39 (0.10%); Thomas Zaugg (People) 56 (0.14%); George Babula (Ind) 84 (0.21%); Cecilia Luu (Ind) 78 (0.20%); Bohdan Ewhen Radejewsky (Ind) 88 (0.22%)	Cheri DiNovo
York South— Weston	Laura Albanese 13,805 (44.23%)	Lan Daniel 3,441 (11.02%)	Paul Ferreira 13,071 (41.88%)	Keith Jarrett 474 (1.52%)	Eric Compton (FPO) 151 (0.48%); Mark Micheal Radejewsky (Ind) 45 (0.14%)	Laura Albanese
York West	Mario Sergio 11,455 (50.11%)	Karlene Nation 2,735 (11.97%)	Tom Rakocevic 7,901 (34.57%)	Joseph Rini 287 (1.26%)	Kayla Baptiste (FPO) 107 (0.47%); Scott Aitchison (Ind) 89 (0.39%); Leland Cornell (Ind) 114 (0.50%)	Mario Sergio

=== Brampton, Mississauga & Oakville ===
Electoral district	Candidates					Incumbent
Electoral district	Liberal	PC	NDP	Green	Other	Incumbent
Bramalea—Gore— Malton	Kuldip Kular 14,349 (32.69%)	Sanjeev Maingi 9,896 (22.55%)	Jagmeet Singh 16,626 (37.88%)	Pauline Thornham 1,091 (2.49%)	Linda O'Marra (FCP) 381 (0.87%); Joy Lee (Libertarian) 738 (1.68%); Archie McLachlan (Ind) 491 (1.12%)	Kuldip Kular
Brampton— Springdale	Linda Jeffrey 15,663 (44.13%)	Pam Hundal 12,754 (35.93%)	Mani Singh 5,378 (15.15%)	James Duncan 900 (2.54%)	**Elizabeth Rowley** (Communist) 152 (0.43%); Jasbir Singh (Paramount) 136 (0.38%); Fauzia Sadiq (COR) 81 (0.23%); Bart Wysokinski (FCP) 193 (0.54%)	Linda Jeffrey
Brampton West	Vic Dhillon 19,224 (43.50%)	Ben Shenouda 14,434 (32.66%)	Dalbir Kathuria 8,331 (18.85%)	Patti Chmelyk 1,432 (3.24%)	Ted Harlson (FPO) 509 (1.15%)	Vic Dhillon
Mississauga— Brampton South	Amrit Mangat 15,579 (45.71%)	Amarjeet Gill 10,287 (30.18%)	Karanjit Pandher 5,420 (15.90%)	Keith Foster 1,247 (3.66%)	Christin Milloy (Libertarian) 691 (2.03%); Masood Khan (Ind) 400 (1.17%); Walter Widla (Ind) 216 (0.63%)	Amrit Mangat
Mississauga East— Cooksville	Dipika Damerla 15,535 (45.49%)	Zoran Churchin 11,297 (33.08%)	Waseem Ahmed 5,704 (16.70%)	Lloyd Jones 934 (2.73%)	Jonathon Dury (FPO) 177 (0.52%); Shriya Shah (Paramount) 117 (0.34%); Winston Harding (Ind) 199 (0.58%)	Vacant
Mississauga— Erindale	Harinder Takhar 20,552 (44.90%)	David Brown 16,294 (35.59%)	Michelle Bilek 7,768 (16.97%)	Otto Casanova 853 (1.86%)	Gerald Jackson (FPO) 176 (0.38%)	Harinder Takhar
Mississauga South	Charles Sousa 20,375 (50.49%)	Geoff Janoscik 14,499 (35.93%)	Anju Sikka 4,044 (10.20%)	Cory Mogk 860 (2.13%)	Mark Harris (FPO) 236 (0.58%); **Paul Figueiras** (Vegan) 165 (0.41%)	Charles Sousa
Mississauga— Streetsville	Bob Delaney 18,591 (51.36%)	Wafik Sunbaty 10,655 (29.44%)	Raed Ayad 5,494 (15.18%)	Scott Warner 1,329 (3.67%)		Bob Delaney
Oakville	Kevin Flynn 21,711 (47.92%)	Larry Scott 17,131 (37.81%)	Lesley Sprague 4,625 (10.21%)	Andrew Chlobowski 878 (1.94%)	Jonathan Banzuela (FCP) 188 (0.41%); Steve Hunter (FPO) 115 (0.25%) Mike Harris (Ind) 498 (1.1%)	Kevin Flynn

=== Hamilton, Burlington & Niagara ===
Electoral district	Candidates					Incumbent
Electoral district	Liberal	PC	NDP	Green	Other	Incumbent
Ancaster— Dundas— Flamborough— Westdale	Ted McMeekin 21,648 (43.54%)	Donna Skelly 17,132 (34.45%)	Trevor Westerhoff 8,521 (17.14%)	Erik Coverdale 1,477 (2.97%)	Glenn Langton (Libertarian) 258 (0.52%); Rick Gunderman Smith (Communist) 87 (0.17%); Bob Maton (FCP) 321 (0.65%); Peter Melanson (FPO) 99 (0.20%)	Ted McMeekin
Burlington	Karmel Sakran 17,909 (35.91%)	Jane McKenna 20,061 (40.22%)	Peggy Russell 9,370 (18.79%)	Alex Brown 1,129 (2.26%)	Andrew Brannan (FPO) 156 (0.31%); Anthony Giles (Libertarian) 639 (1.28%); Tim O'Brien (FCP) 380 (0.76%)	Joyce Savoline†
Halton	Indira Naidoo-Harris 23,080 (39.01%)	Ted Chudleigh 26,228 (44.33%)	Nik Spohr 7,757 (13.11%)	Karen Fraser 1,286 (2.17%)	Gina van den Burg (FPO) 168 (0.28%); Tony Rodrigues (FCP) 296 (0.50%); Phil Buck (Ind) 166 (0.28%)	Ted Chudleigh
Hamilton Centre	Donna Tiqui-Shebib 5,861 (17.37%)	Don Sheppard 4,421 (13.10%)	**Andrea Horwath** 20,586 (61.01%)	Peter Ormond 1,249 (3.70%)	Chris Lawson (FPO) 130 (0.39%); Anthony Gracey (Communist) 122 (0.36%); Michael Baldasaro (Ind) 268 (0.79%); Robert Kuhlmann (Libertarian) 634 (1.88%); Steven Passmore (FCP) 229 (0.68%); Robert Szajkowski (Reform) 67 (0.20%)	Andrea Horwath
Hamilton East— Stoney Creek	Mark Cripps 10,397 (26.16%)	Nancy Fiorentino 7,395 (18.61%)	Paul Miller 20,442 (51.44%)	Peter Randall 692 (1.74%)	Greg Pattinson (Libertarian) 295 (0.74%); Philip Doucette (FPO) 133 (0.33%); Bob Green Innes (FCP) 173 (0.44%)	Paul Miller
Hamilton Mountain	Sophia Aggelonitis 14,694 (32.24%)	Geordie Elms 8,641 (18.96%)	Monique Taylor 20,492 (44.96%)	Tony Morris 748 (1.64%)	Brian Goodwin (FPO) 126 (0.28%); Hans Wienhold (Libertarian) 222 (0.49%); Jim Enos (FCP) 450 (0.99%)	Sophia Aggelonitis
Niagara Falls	Kim Craitor 16,794 (35.66%)	George Lepp 16,296 (34.60%)	Wayne Redekop 12,304 (26.13%)	Byrne Smith 759 (1.61%)	Adam Hyde (Libertarian) 217 (0.46%); Jeannette Tossounian (Ind) 119 (0.25%); Tim Tredwell (Ind) 112 (0.24%); John Jankovic (FCP) 191 (0.41%)	Kim Craitor
Niagara West— Glanbrook	Katie Trombetta 12,708 (25.88%)	**Tim Hudak** 24,919 (50.74%)	Anthony Marco 9,070 (18.47%)	Meredith Cross 1,372 (2.79%)	Geoff Peacock (FPO) 80 (0.16%); Gerry Augustine (Reform) 130 (0.26%); Rob Wienhold (Libertarian) 166 (0.34%); Marty Poos (People) 158 (0.32%); **Phil Lees** (FCP) 303 (0.62%)	Tim Hudak
St. Catharines	Jim Bradley 17,166 (40.03%)	Sandie Bellows 15,461 (36.05%)	Irene Lowell 8,624 (20.11%)	Jennifer Mooradian 1,066 (2.49%)	Saleh Waziruddin (Communist) 68 (0.16%); Chris Clarke (FCP) 191 (0.45%); Jon Radick (CCP) 62 (0.14%); Dave Unrau (FPO) 57 (0.13%)	Jim Bradley
Welland	Benoit Mercier 8,638 (19.64%)	Domenic Ursini 14,048 (31.95%)	Cindy Forster 19,527 (44.41%)	Donna Cridland 1,005 (2.29%)	Donna-Lynne Hamilton (Libertarian) 505 (1.15%)	Peter Kormos†

=== Midwestern Ontario ===
Electoral district	Candidates					Incumbent
Electoral district	Liberal	PC	NDP	Green	Other	Incumbent
Brant	Dave Levac 16,867 (36.93%)	Michael St. Amant 15,761 (34.50%)	Brian Van Tilborg 11,006 (24.09%)	Ken Burns 957 (2.10%)	Daniel Hockley (FCP) 237 (0.52%); Rob Ferguson (Libertarian) 190 (0.42%); **John Turmel** (Paupers) 86 (0.19%); Martin Sitko (Ind) 244 (0.53%); Dustin Jenner (FPO) 136 (0.30%)	Dave Levac
Cambridge	Kathryn McGarry 13,993 (32.93%)	Rob Leone 15,947 (37.53%)	Atinuke Bankole 10,414 (24.51%)	Jacques Malette 1,056 (2.48%)	Allan Dettweiler (Libertarian) 629 (1.48%); Robert Ross (Ind.) 271 (0.64%)	Gerry Martiniuk†
Guelph	Liz Sandals 19,815 (42.25%)	Greg Schirk 11,954 (25.49%)	James Gordon 11,150 (23.77%)	Steven Dyck 3,234 (6.90%)	Drew Garvie (Communist) 139 (0.30%); Phil Bender (Libertarian) 305 (0.65%); Julian Ichim (Ind) 100 (0.21%)	Liz Sandals
Haldimand— Norfolk	Greg Crone 7,087 (17.04%)	Toby Barrett 25,203 (60.59%)	Ian Nichols 8,048 (19.35%)	Justin Blake 868 (2.09%)	John Gots (FCP) 242 (0.58%)	Toby Barrett
Huron— Bruce	Carol Mitchell 14,659 (32.63%)	Lisa Thompson 19,138 (42.60%)	Grant Robertson 9,329 (20.77%)	Patrick Main 772 (1.78%)	Christine Schnurr (FCP) 656 (1.46%); Dennis Valenta (Ind) 200 (0.45%)	Carol Mitchell
Kitchener Centre	John Milloy 15,392 (39.06%)	Dave MacDonald 15,069 (38.24%)	Cameron Dearlove 7,385 (18.74%)	Mark Vercouteren 938 (2.38%)	Bugra Atsiz (FPO) 77 (0.20%); Patrick Bernier (Libertarian) 240 (0.61%); Mark Corbiere (Ind) 137 (0.35%)	John Milloy
Kitchener— Conestoga	Leeanna Pendergast 14,476 (35.29%)	Michael Harris 18,017 (43.92%)	Mark Cairns 7,165 (17.47%)	Robert Rose 1,121 (2.73%)		Leeanna Pendergast
Kitchener— Waterloo	Eric Davis 17,837 (35.91%)	Elizabeth Witmer 21,665 (43.62%)	Isabel Cisterna 8,250 (16.61%)	J.D. McGuire 1,308 (2.63%)	Melanie Motz (FPO) 123 (0.25%); Peter Davis (Ind) 316 (0.64%)	Elizabeth Witmer
Oxford	David Hilderley 9,410 (24.91%)	Ernie Hardeman 20,658 (54.69%)	Dorothy Marie Eisen 5,885 (15.58%)	Catherine Stewart-Mott 1,336 (3.54%)	Leonard Vanderhoeven (FCP) 359 (0.95%)	Ernie Hardeman
Perth— Wellington	John Wilkinson 14,635 (39.53%)	Randy Pettapiece 14,845 (40.09%)	Ellen Papenburg 5,836 (15.76%)	Chris Desjardins 918 (2.48%)	Robert Smink (FPO) 164 (0.44%); Irma DeVries (FCP) 627 (1.69%)	John Wilkinson
Wellington— Halton Hills	Moya Johnson 11,334 (26.74%)	Ted Arnott 23,495 (55.44%)	Dale Hamilton 6,106 (14.41%)	Raymond Dartsch 1,309 (3.09%)		Ted Arnott

=== Southwestern Ontario ===
Electoral district	Candidates					Incumbent
Electoral district	Liberal	PC	NDP	Green	Other	Incumbent
Chatham- Kent— Essex	Paul Watson 11,631 (31.93%)	Rick Nicholls 15,121 (41.51%)	Aleksandra Navarro 8,415 (23.10%)	Holly Sullivan 1,027 (2.82%)		Pat Hoy†
Elgin— Middlesex— London	Lori Baldwin-Sands 11,075 (26.71%)	Jeff Yurek 19,771 (47.68%)	Kathy Cornish 9,201 (22.19%)	Eric Loewen 981 (2.37%)	**Paul McKeever** (FPO) 283 (0.68%)	Steve Peters†
Essex	Ken Schmidt 11,518 (25.03%)	Dave Brister 16,049 (34.88%)	Taras Natyshak 17,417 (37.85%)	Jason Matyi 860 (1.87%)		Bruce Crozier†
Lambton— Kent— Middlesex	Maria Van Bommel 12,423 (29.20%)	Monte McNaughton 19,379 (45.55%)	Joe Hill 8,882 (20.87%)	James Armstrong 987 (2.32%)	**Brad Harness** (Reform) 232 (0.55%); Marinus Vander Vloet (FCP) 350 (0.82%); Tom Jackson (FPO) 119 (0.28%)	Maria Van Bommel
London— Fanshawe	Khalil Ramal 9,678 (28.10%)	Cheryl Miller 9,075 (26.35%)	Teresa Armstrong 13,953 (40.51%)	Bassam Lazar 852 (2.47%)	Tim Harnick (Libertarian) 320 (0.93%); Dave Durnin (FPO) 155 (0.45%); Ali Hamadi (Ind) 192 (0.56%)	Khalil Ramal
London North Centre	Deb Matthews 19,167 (43.69%)	Nancy Branscombe 12,628 (28.79%)	Steve Holmes 9,914 (22.60%)	Kevin Labonte 1,451 (3.31%)	Michael Spottiswood (Paupers) 54 (0.12%); Mary Lou Ambrogio (FPO) 269 (0.61%); Jordan vanKlinken (Libertarian) 169 (0.39%)	Deb Matthews
London West	Chris Bentley 22,610 (45.45%)	Ali Chahbar 14,603 (29.35%)	Jeff Buchanan 10,757 (21.62%)	Gary Brown 1,194 (2.40%)	Tim Hodges (FPO) 300 (0.60%); Chris Gupta (PFRP) 61 (0.12%)	Chris Bentley
Sarnia— Lambton	Stephanie Barry 8,819 (21.67%)	Bob Bailey 19,570 (48.08%)	Brian White 10,307 (25.32%)	Jason Vermette 567 (1.39%)	Andy Bruziewicz (Ind) 1,077 (2.65%); Andrew Falby (Libertarian) 160 (0.39%)	Bob Bailey
Windsor— Tecumseh	Dwight Duncan 15,946 (42.58%)	Robert de Verteuil 7,751 (20.70%)	Andrew McAvoy 12,228 (32.65%)	Justin Levesque 830 (2.22%)	Dan Dominato (Libertarian) 476 (1.27%)	Dwight Duncan
Windsor West	Teresa Piruzza 14,127 (41.05%)	Todd Branch 8,476 (24.61%)	Helmi Charif 10,544 (30.64%)	Chad Durocher 1,051 (3.05%)		Sandra Pupatello†

=== Northern Ontario ===
Electoral district	Candidates					Incumbent
Electoral district	Liberal	PC	NDP	Green	Other	Incumbent
Algoma— Manitoulin	Mike Brown 7,397 (28.28%)	Joe Chapman 6,141 (23.48%)	Michael Mantha 11,585 (44.29%)	Justin Tilson 684 (2.61%)	David Hoffman (FCP) 217 (0.83%)	Mike Brown
Kenora— Rainy River	Anthony Leek 2,202 (9.95%)	Rod McKay 8,307 (37.54%)	Sarah Campbell 10,949 (49.48%)	JoJo Holiday 391 (1.77%)	Charmaine Romaniuk (NOHP) 216 (0.98%)	Howard Hampton†
Nickel Belt	Tony Ryma 7,451 (24.15%)	Paula Peroni 5,625 (18.23%)	France Gélinas 16,876 (54.69%)	Stephanie-Lynn Russell 810 (2.62%)		France Gélinas
Nipissing	Catherine Whiting 8,775 (28.45%)	Vic Fedeli 15,381 (49.86%)	Henri Giroux 5,567 (18.05%)	Scott Haig 971 (2.82%)		Monique Smith†
Parry Sound— Muskoka	Cindy Waters 6,537 (18.12%)	Norm Miller 19,417 (53.83%)	Alex Zyganiuk 6,527 (18.10%)	Matt Richter 3,251 (9.01%)	Andris Stivrins (FPO) 167 (0.46%)	Norm Miller
Sault Ste. Marie	David Orazietti 16,109 (54.68%)	Jib Turner 3,477 (11.82%)	Celia Ross 9,037 (30.67%)	Luke Macmichael 519 (1.76%)	Matthew Hunt (FCP) 172 (0.58%)	David Orazietti
Sudbury	Rick Bartolucci 13,735 (42.22%)	Gerry Labelle 4,400 (13.53%)	Paul Loewenberg 13,204 (40.59%)	Pat Rogerson 870 (2.67%)	Carita Murphy Marketos (FCP) 164 (0.50%); David Popescu (Ind) 44 (0.14%)	Rick Bartolucci
Thunder Bay— Atikokan	Bill Mauro 10,319 (38.83%)	Fred Gilbert 5,815 (21.88%)	Mary Kozorys 9,881 (37.18%)	Jonathan Milnes 379 (1.43%)	Marvin Robert McMenemy (Ind) 86 (0.32%)	Bill Mauro
Thunder Bay— Superior North	Michael Gravelle 11,765 (44.84%)	Anthony LeBlanc 4,578 (17.45%)	Steve Mantis 9,111 (34.72%)	Scot Kyle 555 (2.12%)	Tony Gallo (Libertarian) 133 (0.51%)	Michael Gravelle
Timiskaming— Cochrane	Denis Bonin 6,532 (25.82%)	Randy Aulbrook 5,337 (21.10%)	John Vanthof 12,633 (49.94%)	Tina Danese 312 (1.23%)	Gerry Courville (NOHP) 391 (1.55%)	David Ramsay†
Timmins— James Bay	Leonard Rickard 2,870 (12.32%)	Alan Spacek 8,515 (36.56%)	Gilles Bisson 11,479 (49.29%)	Angela Plant 233 (1.00%)	Robert Neron (FPO) 108 (0.46%)	Gilles Bisson

== Largest Popular Vote ==
Rank	Riding	Winning Party	Elected MPP	% of Popular Vote
1.	Renfrew— Nipissing— Pembroke	█ PC	John Yakabuski	70.58%
2.	Leeds— Grenville	█ PC	Steve Clark	63.34%
3.	Hamilton Centre	█ New Democratic	Andrea Horwath	61.01%
4.	Haldimand— Norfolk	█ PC	Toby Barrett	60.59%
5.	St. Paul's	█ Liberal	Eric Hoskins	58.18%
