= Kitchener—Conestoga =

Kitchener—Conestoga could refer to:

- Kitchener—Conestoga (federal electoral district)
- Kitchener—Conestoga (provincial electoral district)
