= Jim Karahalios =

Leader of the New Blue Party of Ontario

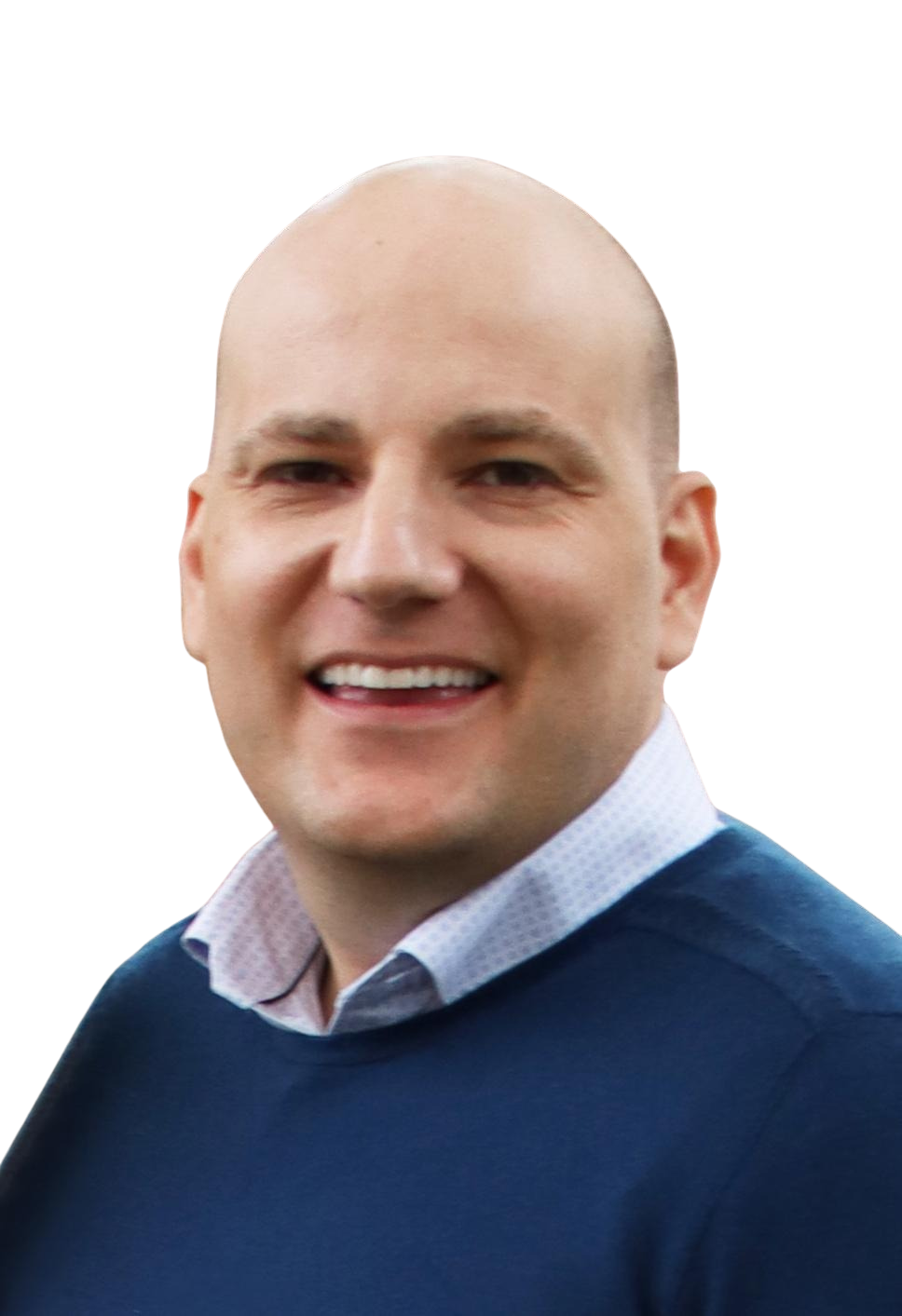
- Karahalios in 2022

Leader of the New Blue Party of Ontario
- Incumbent
- Assumed office October 12, 2020
- President: Belinda Karahalios
- Preceded by: Position established

Personal details
- Born: Dimitrios Karahalios Ontario, Canada
- Party: New Blue
- Other political affiliations: Progressive Conservative (until 2020)
- Spouse: Belinda Karahalios
- Children: 1
- Occupation: Politician; lawyer
- Website: Party profile

Jim Karahalios is a Canadian politician and lawyer who ran as the New Blue candidate for Kitchener—Conestoga in the 2022 Ontario general election. He is the co-founder and leader of the New Blue Party.

== Political career ==
In late 2017, Karahalios was sued by the Progressive Conservative Party of Ontario in retaliation for Karahalios's founding the activist groups "Axe The Carbon Tax" (opposing the party's pro-carbon tax position) and "Take Back Our PC Party" (challenging the party's acceptance of nominations that resulted in allegations of electoral fraud). Karahalios won the lawsuit when Superior Court Justice Paul Perell wrote a decision against the party ruling the lawsuit was a "strategic lawsuit against public participation” intended to stifle dissent.

On March 1, 2018, Karahalios received an apology from interim leader of the PC Party, Vic Fedeli. Robert Benzie, Queen's Park Bureau Chief of the Toronto Star, described Karahalios with the following:

Karahalios was instrumental in exposing problems at Tory candidate nomination elections, the policy-making process and other abuses of the party constitution ... Karahalios, a Cambridge corporate lawyer, has emerged as a conscience of the PC party. His crusade against Brown’s embrace of a carbon tax has been embraced by all the leadership hopefuls in the March 10 PC leadership contest.

Nine days later, on March 10, 2018, Doug Ford was elected as leader of the Progressive Conservative Party of Ontario. His leadership campaign platform, and those of the other three candidates in the race, embraced the themes of Karahalios's "Axe the Carbon Tax" and "Take Back Our PC Party" campaigns.

=== Candidacies for public office ===
In November 2018, Karahalios ran for the presidency of the Ontario Progressive Conservative Party and later filed a lawsuit against the party after his defeat, alleging the election process was manipulated, election rules were breached and that ballot boxes were allegedly stuffed in order to elect his competitor, Brian Patterson, who was endorsed by Doug Ford.

In January 2020, Karahalios announced he was running in the 2020 Conservative Party of Canada leadership election. By March 19, 2020, he was the third candidate in the race to raise the $300,000 in donations and 3,000 endorsement signatures the party required to have his name added to the ballot. On March 20, 2020, the party disqualified Karahalios from the race due to accusations of anti-Islamic bigotry over a mass-distributed letter targeting Erin O'Toole's campaign chair Walied Soliman, a Toronto corporate lawyer who is Muslim. The letter accused O’Toole of promoting Sharia law by having Soliman on his campaign.

On May 20, 2020, Superior Court Justice Paul Perell quashed the party’s initial disqualification of Karahalios because the decision was made by a subcommittee that didn’t have the authority to do so. However, the decision left open the possibility of the party’s 18-member leadership election organizing committee (LEOC) taking up the matter and choosing to disqualify Karahalios through the proper means, which it did a few days later.

In August 2022, Karahalios registered to run for Cambridge City Council in the 2022 municipal elections, running for Ward 5 Councilor. Karahalios was unsuccessful, receiving 21% of the vote and finishing third.

=== New Blue Party ===
On October 12, 2020, Jim and Belinda Karahalios released a video announcing that they were forming a new political party, claiming that the Ontario PC Party was beyond redemption. Stating that there "is no party in the Ontario legislature defending the taxpayer, defending small business, defending places of worship, promoting freedom, promoting democracy or fighting political corruption."

On January 7, 2021, the New Blue Party was officially registered by Elections Ontario. Karahalios stated that the party would focus on supporting the taxpayer, places of worship and small business.

== Personal life ==
He is married to Belinda Karahalios, a former member of the Ontario Provincial Parliament for Cambridge.

== Election results ==
2025 Ontario general election: Kitchener—Conestoga
Party	Candidate	Votes	%	±%	Expenditures
Progressive Conservative	Mike Harris Jr.	16,946	41.54	+1.53	$86,900
Liberal	Joe Gowing	12,031	29.49	+11.96	$17,307
New Democratic	Jodi Szimanski	7,551	18.51	–10.36	$39,506
Green	Brayden Wagenaar	2,227	5.46	–0.80	$0
New Blue	Jim Karahalios	1,152	2.83	–3.08	$12,335
Ontario Party	Patrick Doucette	890	2.18	+0.85	$5,565
Total valid votes/expense limit		40,797	99.20	-0.18	$129,674
Total rejected, unmarked, and declined ballots		329	0.80	+0.18	
Turnout		41,126	51.62	+2.74	
Eligible voters		79,677			
Progressive Conservative hold		Swing		–5.95	
Source: Elections Ontario

2022 Cambridge Municipal Election: Ward 5
Candidate	Vote	%
Sheri Roberts	1,550	38.33
Amanda Maxwell	1,208	29.87
Jim Karahalios	859	21.24
Naeem Awan	271	6.70
Mark D. Fisher	156	3.86

2022 Ontario general election: Kitchener—Conestoga
Party	Candidate	Votes	%	±%	Expenditures
Progressive Conservative	Mike Harris Jr.	15,045	40.03	+0.45	$97,578
New Democratic	Karen Meissner	10,851	28.87	−9.11	$102,506
Liberal	Melanie Van Alphen	6,590	17.53	+3.49	$13,807
Green	Nasir Abdulle	2,315	6.16	−0.48	$0
New Blue	Jim Karahalios	2,223	5.91		$68,446
Ontario Party	Elisabeth Perrin Snyder	501	1.33		$0
Populist	Jason Adair	64	0.17		$0
Total valid votes/expense limit		37,589	99.38	+1.28	$108,331
Total rejected, unmarked, and declined ballots		234	0.62	-1.28	
Turnout		37,823	48.88	-11.05	
Eligible voters		76,692			
Progressive Conservative hold		Swing		+4.78	
Source(s): "Summary of Valid Votes Cast for Each Candidate" (PDF). Elections Ontario. 2022. Archived from the original on 2023-05-18.; "Statistical Summary by Electoral District" (PDF). Elections Ontario. 2022. Archived from the original on 2023-05-21.
