= Brian Riddell =

Canadian politician

Brian Riddell MPP
- Riddell in 2024

Member of the Ontario Provincial Parliament for Cambridge
- Incumbent
- Assumed office June 2, 2022
- Preceded by: Belinda Karahalios

Personal details
- Born: Galt, Ontario, Canada
- Party: Progressive Conservative
- Spouse: Suzanne Riddell
- Children: 2
- Profession: Sales Engineer-Photographer

Brian Riddell MPP is a Canadian politician elected to the Legislative Assembly of Ontario in the 2022 provincial election. He represents the riding of Cambridge as a member of the Progressive Conservative Party of Ontario.

He is a member of the Ontario Progressive Conservative Caucus and is the Parliamentary Assistant to the Minister of Public and Business Service Delivery and Procurement. He served as the chair of the Social Policy Committee and is currently the standing chair of the Justice Policy Advisory Team.

== Personal life ==
Born in Galt, Ontario, Brian Riddell has spent his entire life in Cambridge, where he has been an active member of the community. He has raised his two sons in the city, contributing to its growth and development both personally and professionally. He has served on various city committees and organizations in his hometown of Cambridge, Ontario, including the Art & Culture and Heritage committees. Brian, an avid baseball and ski race coach, has been involved with his community of Cambridge for over four decades.

Brian graduated from Southwood Secondary School before attending Wilfrid Laurier University, the University of Chicago and Conestoga College. Before entering provincial politics, he was a professor at Conestoga College in the Creative Industries division. Before his tenure at Conestoga College, Brian held senior business management/engineering positions at Michelin Canada and Bridgestone Canada for over thirty years.

== Political career ==
Brian Riddell was elected as the Member of Provincial Parliament (MPP) for Cambridge in 2022. As part of his legislative work, he has focused on consumer protection, housing, and infrastructure. Riddell played a role in the Ontario government's decision to ban Notices of Security Interest (NOSIs) in residential real estate, a financial mechanism that allowed certain businesses to place liens on homeowners’ properties, often without their clear understanding. The legislative move aimed to prevent predatory practices that could lead to unexpected debt burdens for homeowners.

Brian graduated from Wilfrid Laurier University, the University of Chicago and Conestoga College. In his prior life, he was a professor at Conestoga College in the Creative Industries division. Before his tenure at Conestoga College, Brian held senior business management/engineering positions at Michelin Canada and Bridgestone Canada for over thirty years. He has served on various city committees and organizations in his hometown of Cambridge, Ontario, including the Art & Culture and Heritage committees.

Brian, an avid baseball and ski race coach, has been involved with his community of Cambridge for over four decades.

A business leader, entrepreneur visual communicator, aerial photographer, and flight reviewer for Transport Canada, he has travelled and studied over six continents, photographing the world's ever-changing, evolving environments. He specializes in the study of glaciology in Canada, Iceland, and Antarctica. His work has been exhibited worldwide, and he has received many accolades.

== Electoral history ==
2025 Ontario general election: Cambridge
Party	Candidate	Votes	%	±%	Expenditures
Progressive Conservative	Brian Riddell	19,210	43.66	+6.63	$79,790
Liberal	Rob Deutschmann	15,131	34.39	+13.69	$75,914
New Democratic	Marjorie Knight	5,074	11.53	–10.66	$10,959
Green	Carla Johnson	2,519	5.72	–3.25	$26,384
New Blue	Belinda Karahalios	2,067	4.70	–6.40	$12,335
Total valid votes/expense limit		44,001	99.44	–	$155,491
Total rejected, unmarked and declined ballots		247	0.56	+0.08	
Turnout		44,248	45.82	+2.60	
Eligible voters		96,578			
Progressive Conservative hold		Swing		+10.16	
Source: Elections Ontario

2022 Ontario general election: Cambridge
Party	Candidate	Votes	%	±%	Expenditures
Progressive Conservative	Brian Riddell	14,590	37.03	+0.06	$84,737
New Democratic	Marjorie Knight	8,745	22.19	–10.30	$54,806
Liberal	Surekha Shenoy	8,155	20.70	–2.55	$77,446
New Blue	Belinda Karahalios	4,374	11.10	–25.87†	$98,338
Green	Carla Johnson	3,537	8.98	+2.71	$14,902
Total valid votes/expense limit		39,401	99.52	+0.81	$128,747
Total rejected, unmarked and declined ballots		190	0.48	–0.81	
Turnout		39,591	43.22	–11.96	
Eligible voters		91,608			
Progressive Conservative hold		Swing		▲5.18	
Source: Elections Ontario † Belinda Karahalios ran as a member of the Progressive Conservative party in the 2018 election. The New Blue party did not exist in 2018, and the percentage loss for the New Blue party is based on the percentage personally lost as a candidate by Karahalios between elections.
