= Mike Harris Jr. =

Canadian politician

The Honourable Mike Harris Jr. ECO MPP
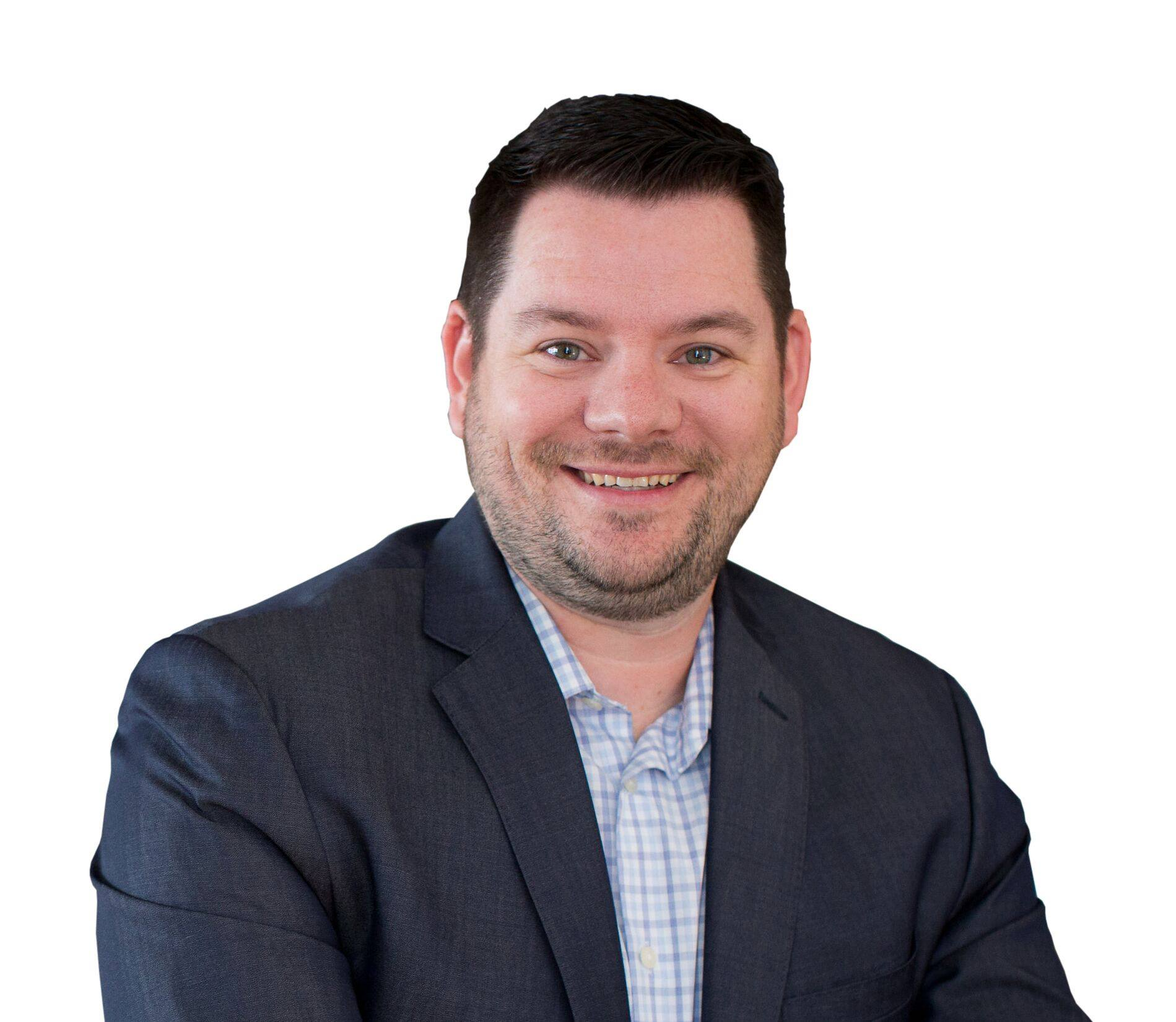

Minister of Natural Resources
- Incumbent
- Assumed office March 19, 2025
- Preceded by: Graydon Smith

Minister of Red Tape Reduction
- In office June 6, 2024 – March 19, 2025
- Preceded by: Parm Gill
- Succeeded by: Andrea Khanjin

Member of the Ontario Provincial Parliament for Kitchener—Conestoga
- Incumbent
- Assumed office June 29, 2018
- Preceded by: Michael Harris

Personal details
- Born: February 1985 (age 41)
- Party: Progressive Conservative Party of Ontario
- Relations: Mike Harris (father)
- Occupation: Politician

Mike Harris Jr. MPP (born 1985) is a Canadian politician who was elected to the Legislative Assembly of Ontario in the 2018 provincial election. He represents the riding of Kitchener—Conestoga as a member of the Progressive Conservative Party of Ontario. He serves as provincial Minister of Natural Resources, having previously served as Minister of Red Tape Reduction.

He is the son of former Ontario premier Mike Harris. He is not related to Michael Harris, his immediate predecessor as MPP for Kitchener—Conestoga.

== Political career ==
In the 2018 Ontario general election, Harris unsuccessfully stood to become the PC candidate in the district of Waterloo, losing to management consultant Dan Weber. Instead, Harris was chosen as the party's nominee in the district of Kitchener—Conestoga. At the time of his election in 2018, he was said to have "only recent expressed an interest in politics". Harris was reelected in the 2022 general election.

== Personal life ==
Harris lives in Kitchener with his wife Kim and their five children. He is a graduate of Nipissing University in North Bay.

== Electoral record ==
2025 Ontario general election: Kitchener—Conestoga
Party	Candidate	Votes	%	±%	Expenditures
Progressive Conservative	Mike Harris Jr.	16,946	41.54	+1.53	$86,900
Liberal	Joe Gowing	12,031	29.49	+11.96	$17,307
New Democratic	Jodi Szimanski	7,551	18.51	–10.36	$39,506
Green	Brayden Wagenaar	2,227	5.46	–0.80	$0
New Blue	Jim Karahalios	1,152	2.83	–3.08	$12,335
Ontario Party	Patrick Doucette	890	2.18	+0.85	$5,565
Total valid votes/expense limit		40,797	99.20	-0.18	$129,674
Total rejected, unmarked, and declined ballots		329	0.80	+0.18	
Turnout		41,126	51.62	+2.74	
Eligible voters		79,677			
Progressive Conservative hold		Swing		–5.95	
Source: Elections Ontario

2022 Ontario general election: Kitchener—Conestoga
Party	Candidate	Votes	%	±%	Expenditures
Progressive Conservative	Mike Harris Jr.	15,045	40.03	+0.45	$97,578
New Democratic	Karen Meissner	10,851	28.87	−9.11	$102,506
Liberal	Melanie Van Alphen	6,590	17.53	+3.49	$13,807
Green	Nasir Abdulle	2,315	6.16	−0.48	$0
New Blue	Jim Karahalios	2,223	5.91		$68,446
Ontario Party	Elisabeth Perrin Snyder	501	1.33		$0
Populist	Jason Adair	64	0.17		$0
Total valid votes/expense limit		37,589	99.38	+1.28	$108,331
Total rejected, unmarked, and declined ballots		234	0.62	-1.28	
Turnout		37,823	48.88	-11.05	
Eligible voters		76,692			
Progressive Conservative hold		Swing		+4.78	
Source(s): "Summary of Valid Votes Cast for Each Candidate" (PDF). Elections Ontario. 2022. Archived from the original on 2023-05-18.; "Statistical Summary by Electoral District" (PDF). Elections Ontario. 2022. Archived from the original on 2023-05-21.

2018 Ontario general election: Kitchener—Conestoga
Party	Candidate	Votes	%	±%
Progressive Conservative	Mike Harris Jr.	17,005	39.57	+3.18
New Democratic	Kelly Dick	16,319	37.97	+16.78
Liberal	Joe Gowing	6,035	14.04	-19.30
Green	Bob Jonkman	2,853	6.64	-0.33
Libertarian	Daniel Benoy	550	1.28	-0.85
Consensus Ontario	Dan Holt	212	0.49	
Total valid votes		42,974	100.0	
Turnout			60.8	
Eligible voters		70,712		
Source: Elections Ontario
