= Martin Hyde =

Martin Hyde may refer to:

- Martin Hyde, candidate in the 2007 Ontario provincial election
- Martin Hyde, a character in an episode of Highlander: The Series
- Martin Hyde: The Duke's Messenger, a 1910 historical novel by John Masefield

== See also ==
- Martin Hyder (born 1961), English actor and writer
