= Belinda Karahalios =

Canadian politician

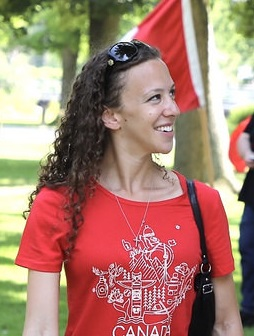
- Karahalios in July 2018

President of the New Blue Party of Ontario
- Incumbent
- Assumed office October 12, 2020
- Leader: Jim Karahalios
- Preceded by: Position established

Member of the Ontario Provincial Parliament for Cambridge
- In office June 7, 2018 – May 3, 2022
- Preceded by: Kathryn McGarry
- Succeeded by: Brian Riddell

Personal details
- Born: 1981/1982 (age 44–45) Mississauga, Ontario, Canada
- Party: New Blue
- Other party: Progressive Conservative (2018–2020)
- Spouse: Jim Karahalios
- Children: 1
- Occupation: Politician; healthcare consultant
- Portfolio: Parliamentary Assistant to the Minister of Children, Community and Social Services (2018–2019), Parliamentary Assistant to the Solicitor General (2019–2020)
- Website: Party profile

Belinda Carmen Karahalios (born 1981 or 1982) is a Canadian politician who served as the member of Provincial Parliament for the riding of Cambridge in the Legislative Assembly of Ontario from 2018 to 2022.

Karahalios was originally elected in the 2018 provincial election as a member of the Progressive Conservative Party of Ontario (PC). She was ejected from the party caucus in July 2020 for voting against Bill 195, which would allow the provincial government to extend emergency powers for up to two years without consulting the legislature. She finished her term as a member of the New Blue Party of Ontario, which is led by her husband, Jim Karahalios. Karahalios was unseated by the Progressive Conservative candidate in the 2022 Ontario general election.

== Political career ==
Karahalios won in the riding of Cambridge in the Ontario general election in 2018. On June 29, 2018, she was appointed as the parliamentary assistant to Lisa MacLeod, the Minister of Children, Community and Social Services. Following a cabinet shuffle on June 20, 2019, she was appointed as the parliamentary assistant to Sylvia Jones, the Solicitor General.

On November 26, 2019, Karahalios tabled Bill 150, the Ensuring Transparency and Integrity in Political Party Elections Act, 2019. This legislation would make it an offence for anyone in Ontario to commit voter fraud in an internal party election. The grounds for introducing the bill was internal party corruption, alleged by Jim Karahalios, Doug Ford, Vikram Singh, and others in the 2018 Progressive Conservative Party of Ontario leadership election and in the same party's November 2018 convention. The bill passed second reading unanimously, despite initial indications that the Ontario PC caucus would vote against it, but died when an election was called and the 42nd Parliament of Ontario was dissolved on May 3, 2022.

Karahalios was ejected from the Progressive Conservative caucus by party leader and premier Doug Ford after voting against Bill 195, the Reopening Ontario Act, which would expand the government's emergency authority during the COVID-19 pandemic. Karahalios voted against the legislation, calling it an "unnecessary overreach on our parliamentary democracy."

Karahalios co-founded the New Blue Party of Ontario alongside her husband, Jim Karahalios.

In December 2021, Karahalios was ejected from the Legislative Assembly for failing to present a proof of vaccination. Karahalios presented a negative COVID-19 antigen test, but it was rejected because it had occurred within 90 days of her last positive test.

Karahalios was originally a supporter of Bill 184, which amended the Residential Tenancies Act to remove rent control from any rental units first occupied after November 15, 2018. In a 2020 Committee on Social Policy hearing, during which community organizers and certain MPPs who opposed the bill spoke about the bill's negative impact on the social stability of communities in Toronto (including such issues as bad faith evictions leading to homelessness), Karahalios expressed concern about the "vilification" of landlords, and noted that "We hear stories from both tenants and landlords, and yes, I’ve come across bad tenants and bad landlords. Not all landlords are bad and not all tenants are bad." After other members of the Committee and the community who were present at the meeting described the impact of rent decontrol leading to profit-motivated evictions by the large corporations which provide the majority of rental housing in Ontario, Karahalios reiterated her concern about "small [landlords] who ... wound up with some tenants they’re not having a great experience with."

Karahalios was unseated by the Progressive Conservative candidate in the 2022 Ontario general election. She ran for Cambridge City Council in the 2022 municipal elections, but lost.

== Personal life ==
Belinda Karahalios is married to Jim Karahalios, a corporate lawyer and founder of activist groups "Axe The Carbon Tax" and "Take Back Our PC Party", who was disqualified from running in the 2020 Conservative Party of Canada leadership election. She is of mixed Trinidadian and Portuguese descent.

== Election results ==
2025 Ontario general election: Cambridge
Party	Candidate	Votes	%	±%	Expenditures
Progressive Conservative	Brian Riddell	19,210	43.66	+6.63	$79,790
Liberal	Rob Deutschmann	15,131	34.39	+13.69	$75,914
New Democratic	Marjorie Knight	5,074	11.53	–10.66	$10,959
Green	Carla Johnson	2,519	5.72	–3.26	$26,384
New Blue	Belinda Karahalios	2,067	4.70	–6.40	$12,335
Total valid votes/expense limit		44,001	99.44	-0.08	$155,491
Total rejected, unmarked, and declined ballots		247	0.56	+0.08	
Turnout		44,248	46.19	+2.97	
Eligible voters		95,786			
Progressive Conservative hold		Swing		–3.5	
Source: Elections Ontario

2022 Ontario general election: Cambridge
Party	Candidate	Votes	%	±%	Expenditures
Progressive Conservative	Brian Riddell	14,590	37.03	+0.06 †	$84,737
New Democratic	Marjorie Knight	8,745	22.19	−10.30	$54,806
Liberal	Surekha Shenoy	8,155	20.70	−2.55	$77,446
New Blue	Belinda Karahalios	4,374	11.10	-25.87 †	$98,338
Green	Carla Johnson	3,537	8.98	+2.71	$14,902
Total valid votes/expense limit		39,401	99.52	+0.81	$128,747
Total rejected, unmarked, and declined ballots		190	0.48	-0.81	
Turnout		39,591	43.22	-11.95	
Eligible voters		91,954			
Progressive Conservative gain from New Blue		Swing		+5.18	
Source(s): "Summary of Valid Votes Cast for Each Candidate" (PDF). Elections Ontario. 2022. Archived from the original on 2023-05-18.; "Statistical Summary by Electoral District" (PDF). Elections Ontario. 2022. Archived from the original on 2023-05-21.

- † Belinda Karahalios ran as a member of the Progressive Conservative party in the 2018 election. The New Blue party did not exist in 2018, and the percentage loss for the New Blue party is based on the percentage personally lost as a candidate by Karahalios between elections.

2018 Ontario general election
Party	Candidate	Votes	%	±%
Progressive Conservative	Belinda Karahalios	17,793	36.97%	+4.41
New Democratic	Marjorie Knight	15,639	32.49%	+10.88
Liberal	Kathryn McGarry	11,191	23.25%	-15.67
Green	Michele Braniff	3,018	6.27%	+0.61
Libertarian	Allan Dettweiler	490	1.02%	-0.24
Total valid votes			100.0	
Progressive Conservative gain from Liberal		Swing		-
Source: Elections Ontario
