= Leeanna Pendergast =

Canadian politician

Ontario MPP
- In office 2007–2011
- Preceded by: New riding
- Succeeded by: Michael Harris
- Constituency: Kitchener—Conestoga

Personal details
- Born: 1962 (age 63–64) Kitchener, Ontario, Canada
- Party: Liberal
- Occupation: Teacher

Leeanna Pendergast (born c. 1962) is a former Canadian politician. She was a Liberal member of the Legislative Assembly of Ontario from 2007 to 2011, representing the riding of Kitchener—Conestoga.

== Background ==
Pendergast was born in Kitchener, Ontario in 1962. She obtained a bachelor's degree from the University of Waterloo. She also studied at the University of Toronto and at Oxford University in England, receiving a Master of Arts, a Bachelor of Education, and a Master of Education. She worked at numerous high schools in the region, serving as the vice-principal of four schools and as an education consultant for the Ministry of Children and Youth Services. Pendergast has helped develop various programs for youth in Kitchener, including the Safe Schools Initiative and the Breakfast Program for Needy Students. She has also chaired the Education Foundation golf classic, raising money for literacy and numeracy initiatives.

She and her husband, Richard, have lived in Conestogo, just outside Kitchener, and is a vice-principal at Sir John A. MacDonald Public School. She has three sons, Adam, Alexander and Benjamin.

== Politics ==
In the 2007 provincial election she was elected in the riding of Kitchener—Conestoga defeating Progressive Conservative candidate Michael Harris by about 1,500 votes. On October 30, 2007, she was named the parliamentary assistant to the Minister Responsible for Women's Issues, Deb Matthews.

On September 11, 2009, Pendergast was named the parliamentary assistant to the Minister of Education. She was the co-chair of the Working Group on Financial Literacy, tasked with submitting a report to the curriculum council with recommendations on how to seamlessly integrate financial literacy into the Ontario curriculum from Grades 4 to 12.

In the 2011 provincial election, Pendergast faced Michael Harris again. This time, Harris defeated Pendergast by 3,700 votes.
