= Michael Harris (politician, born 1979) =

Canadian politician (born 1979)

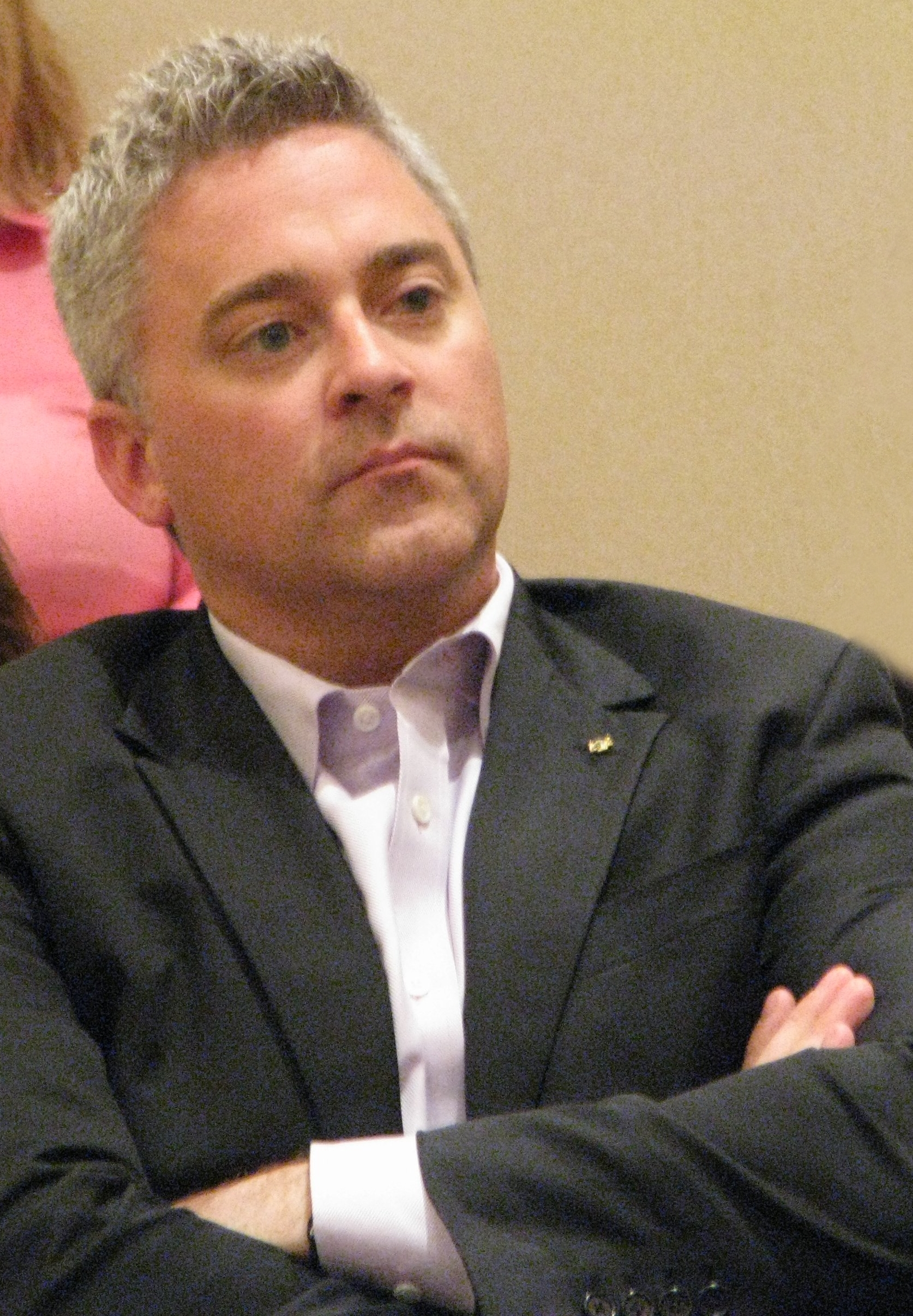

Waterloo Regional Councillor for Kitchener
- Incumbent
- Assumed office December 1, 2018
- Preceded by: Karen Redman

Member of the Ontario Provincial Parliament for Kitchener—Conestoga
- In office October 6, 2011 – June 7, 2018
- Preceded by: Leeanna Pendergast
- Succeeded by: Mike Harris Jr.

Personal details
- Born: Michael Donald Harris; May 10, 1979 (age 47) Mount Forest, Ontario, Canada
- Party: Independent
- Other political affiliations: Progressive Conservative (until 2018)
- Education: Conestoga College; University of Guelph (MA)
- Occupation: Salesman

Michael Donald Harris (born May 10, 1979) is a Canadian politician who has been a regional councillor for the Regional Municipality of Waterloo since 2018. Harris was formerly a member of Provincial Parliament (MPP), and represented Kitchener—Conestoga from 2011 to 2018 as a member of the Progressive Conservative Party until April 9, 2018, when he sat as an independent.

Harris is not related to Mike Harris Jr., who succeeded him as the PC MPP for the Kitchener—Conestoga, or former Ontario premier Mike Harris (who is the father of Mike Jr.).

== Background ==
Harris was raised on a farm near Mount Forest, Ontario. He worked in the sales department at Honeywell in Waterloo before being elected as MPP for Kitchener—Conestoga in 2011. He now lives in Kitchener with his family.

On October 22, 2017, Harris graduated from the University of Guelph with a Master of Arts.

== Political career ==
=== Provincial politics ===
In the 2007 provincial election, Harris ran as the Progressive Conservative candidate in the riding of Kitchener—Conestoga. He was defeated by Liberal Leeanna Pendergast by about 1,500 votes. In the 2011 provincial election he ran against Pendergast again, this time defeating her by 3,700 votes. He was re-elected in the 2014 provincial election defeating Liberal candidate Wayne Wright by 1,794 votes.

Harris was removed from the PC caucus in 2018, after a complaint from a former intern and the alleged discovery of text messages "of a sexual nature, which included a request for her to send him photos, an invitation for her to meet with him late at night and a reference to something that may have taken place in his office at Queen's Park."

In response, Harris issued what he called an "unequivocal apology for the inappropriate texting conversation," which he said was brought to the party's attention "a number of years ago."

=== Municipal politics ===
On July 24, 2018, it was reported that Harris announced his candidacy for Waterloo Regional Council. He was elected on October 22, 2018.
