= Kitchener—Conestoga (provincial electoral district) =

Provincial electoral district in Ontario, Canada

Coordinates: 43.547°N 80.633°W

Ontario electoral district
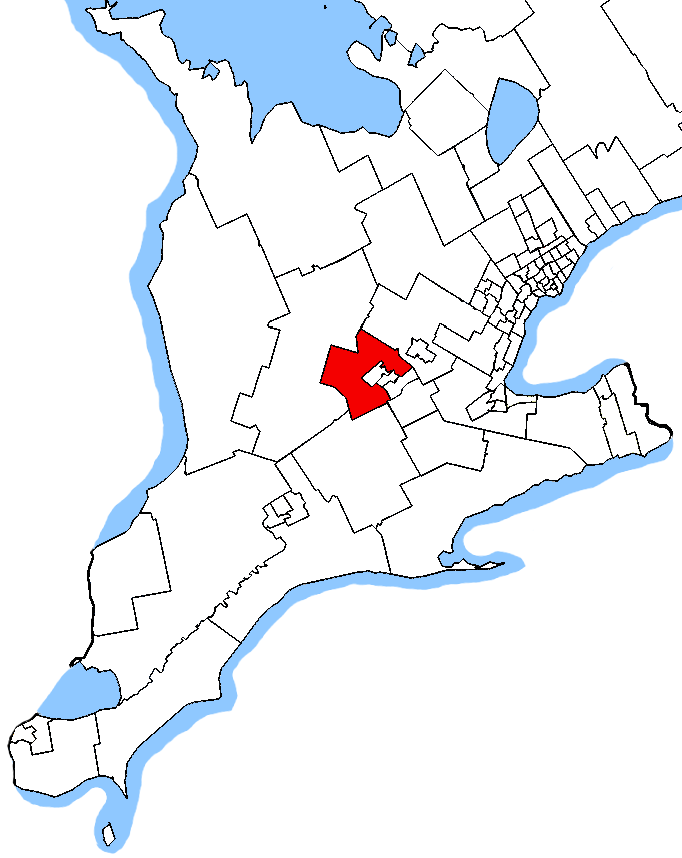
- Kitchener—Conestoga in relation to Southern Ontario ridings

Provincial electoral district
- Legislature: Legislative Assembly of Ontario
MPP
Mike Harris Jr.
Progressive Conservative
- District created: 2006
- First contested: 2007
- Last contested: 2025

Demographics
- Population (2016): 100,705
- Electors (2018): 73,095
- Area (km²): 906
- Pop. density (per km²): 111.2
- Census division: Waterloo
- Census subdivision(s): Kitchener, Wellesley, Wilmot, Woolwich

Kitchener—Conestoga is a provincial electoral district in Ontario, Canada, that has been represented in the Legislative Assembly of Ontario since the 2007 provincial election. Its population in 2006 was 114,405.

== Geography ==
The district includes the townships of Woolwich, Wellesley and Wilmot, and the southwestern part of the city of Kitchener, i.e., the part of the city of Kitchener lying west of Fischer-Hallman Road.

== Members of Provincial Parliament ==
Kitchener—Conestoga
Assembly	Years	Member	Party
Riding created
38th	2007–2011	Leeanna Pendergast	Liberal
40th	2011–2014	Michael Harris	Progressive Conservative
41st	2014–2018	Michael Harris	Progressive Conservative
41st	2018–2018	Michael Harris	Independent
42nd	2018–2022	Mike Harris Jr.	Progressive Conservative
43rd	2022–present	Mike Harris Jr.	Progressive Conservative

== Election results ==
Winning party in each polling division of Kitchener—Conestoga at the 2025 Ontario general election

2025 Ontario general election
Party	Candidate	Votes	%	±%	Expenditures
Progressive Conservative	Mike Harris Jr.	16,946	41.54	+1.51	$86,900
Liberal	Joe Gowing	12,031	29.49	+11.96	$17,307
New Democratic	Jodi Szimanski	7,551	18.51	–10.36	$39,506
Green	Brayden Wagenaar	2,227	5.46	–0.70	$0
New Blue	Jim Karahalios	1,152	2.82	–3.09	$12,335
Ontario Party	Patrick Doucette	890	2.18	+0.85	$5,565
Total valid votes/expense limit		40,797	99.20	–	$129,674
Total rejected, unmarked and declined ballots		329	0.80	+0.18	
Turnout		41,126	51.06	+2.18	
Eligible voters		80,543			
Progressive Conservative hold		Swing		–5.22	
Source: Elections Ontario

Winning party in each polling division of Kitchener—Conestoga at the 2022 Ontario general election

2022 Ontario general election
Party	Candidate	Votes	%	±%	Expenditures
Progressive Conservative	Mike Harris Jr.	15,045	40.03	+0.45	$97,578
New Democratic	Karen Meissner	10,851	28.87	–9.11	$102,506
Liberal	Melanie Van Alphen	6,590	17.53	+3.49	$13,807
Green	Nasir Abdulle	2,315	6.16	–0.48	$0
New Blue	Jim Karahalios	2,223	5.91	–	$68,446
Ontario Party	Elisabeth Perrin Snyder	501	1.33	–	$0
Populist	Jason Adair	64	0.17	–	$0
Total valid votes/expense limit		37,589	99.38	–	$108,331
Total rejected, unmarked and declined ballots		234	0.62	–1.28	
Turnout		37,823	48.88	–11.05	
Eligible voters		77,379			
Progressive Conservative hold		Swing		+4.78	
Source: Elections Ontario

2018 Ontario general election
Party	Candidate	Votes	%	±%
Progressive Conservative	Mike Harris Jr.	17,005	39.57	+3.21
New Democratic	Kelly Dick	16,319	37.97	+16.78
Liberal	Joe Gowing	6,035	14.04	–19.30
Green	Bob Jonkman	2,853	6.64	–0.34
Libertarian	Daniel Benoy	550	1.28	–0.85
Consensus Ontario	Dan Holt	212	0.49	–
Total valid votes		42,974	98.10	
Total rejected, unmarked and declined ballots		831	1.90	+0.28
Turnout		43,805	59.93	+9.60
Eligible voters		73,095		
Progressive Conservative hold		Swing		–6.78
Source: Elections Ontario

2014 Ontario general election
Party	Candidate	Votes	%	±%
Progressive Conservative	Michael Harris	17,083	36.36	–7.82
Liberal	Wayne Wright	15,664	33.34	–2.16
New Democratic	James Villeneuve	9,958	21.19	+3.62
Green	David Weber	3,277	6.97	+4.23
Libertarian	David Schumm	1,001	2.13	–
Total valid votes		46,983	98.38	
Total rejected, unmarked and declined ballots		774	1.62	+1.03
Turnout		47,757	50.33	+3.71
Eligible voters		94,886		
Progressive Conservative hold		Swing		–2.83
Source: Elections Ontario

2011 Ontario general election
Party	Candidate	Votes	%	±%
Progressive Conservative	Michael Harris	18,017	44.18	+7.15
Liberal	Leeanna Pendergast	14,476	35.50	–6.32
New Democratic	Mark Cairns	7,165	17.57	+5.92
Green	Robert Rose	1,121	2.75	–4.44
Total valid votes		40,779	99.41	
Total rejected, unmarked and declined ballots		244	0.59	–0.34
Turnout		41,023	46.62	–2.63
Eligible voters		87,992		
Progressive Conservative gain from Liberal		Swing		+6.73
Source: Elections Ontario

2007 Ontario general election
Party	Candidate	Votes	%
Liberal	Leeanna Pendergast	16,315	41.82
Progressive Conservative	Michael Harris	14,450	37.04
New Democratic	Mark Cairns	4,545	11.65
Green	Colin Jones	2,805	7.19
Family Coalition	Len Solomon	510	1.31
Libertarian	Larry Stevens	246	0.63
Freedom	David Driver	145	0.37
Total valid votes		39,016	99.07
Total rejected, unmarked and declined ballots		367	0.93
Turnout		39,383	49.25
Eligible voters		79,970	
Liberal pickup new district.			
Source: Elections Ontario

== 2007 electoral reform referendum ==
2007 Ontario electoral reform referendum
Side	Votes	%
First Past the Post	24,287	63.7
Mixed member proportional	13,872	36.3
Total valid votes	38,159	100.0

== See also ==
- List of Ontario provincial electoral districts
- Canadian provincial electoral districts

== Sources ==
- Elections Ontario Past Election Results
- Map of riding for 2018 election
