= New Blue Party of Ontario =

Provincial political party in Canada

New Blue Party of Ontario Nouveau Parti Bleu de l'Ontario
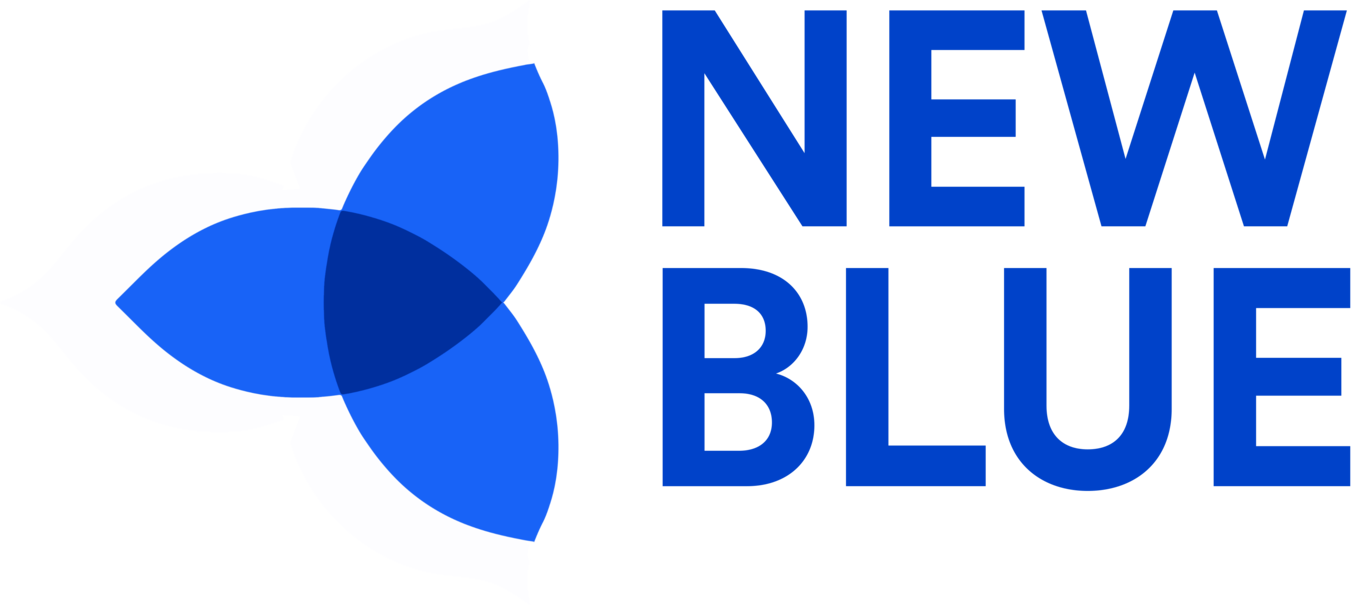
- Abbreviation: New Blue
- Leader: Jim Karahalios
- President: Belinda Karahalios
- Founded: October 12, 2020
- Split from: Progressive Conservative Party of Ontario
- Headquarters: Cambridge, Ontario
- Ideology: Conservatism; Right-wing populism
- Political position: Right-wing
- Colours: Blue and gold

Website
- www.newblueontario.com

The New Blue Party of Ontario (New Blue; French: Nouveau Parti Bleu de l'Ontario) is a right-wing populist political party in the Canadian province of Ontario. Founded in 2020, the party is led by Jim Karahalios, the husband of Belinda Karahalios, the party's first MPP. Both split from the Progressive Conservative Party of Ontario out of frustration with what they consider that party's lack of adherence to conservative principles.

== History ==
=== Prior to the party's formation ===
In 2017, following the resignation of Patrick Brown and the election of Doug Ford as Ontario PC Party leader, Belinda Karahalios ran for and won the party's nomination in the riding of Cambridge. She was then elected in the 2018 Ontario election.

In November 2018, Belinda's husband, corporate lawyer Jim Karahalios, ran unsuccessfully for the presidency of the Ontario Progressive Conservative Party. He filed a lawsuit against the party after his defeat, alleging that his competitor, Brian Patterson, who was endorsed by Doug Ford, was chosen through manipulation of the election process, breached election rules and stuffed ballot boxes. In late 2018, Jim was sued by the Progressive Conservative Party of Ontario after he founded the activist groups "Axe The Carbon Tax" (opposing the party's pro-carbon tax position) and "Take Back Our PC Party" (challenging the party's acceptance of nominations that resulted in allegations of electoral fraud). The suit was dismissed by Ontario Superior Court justice Paul Perell, who ruled that the PC Party's lawsuit was a strategic lawsuit against public participation intended to stifle dissent.

On July 21, 2020, Belinda Karahalios was expelled from the Progressive Conservative caucus by Doug Ford after voting against Bill 195, the Reopening Ontario (A Flexible Response to COVID-19) Act, which would expand the government's emergency authority during the COVID-19 pandemic. Karahalios voted against the legislation, calling it an "unnecessary overreach on our parliamentary democracy." A month later, Belinda, Jim, and 18 other members of the Ontario PC Party were removed from the Cambridge PC Riding Association Board after the party executive, led by Brian Patterson, voted to "de-register" the riding association with Elections Ontario.

=== After the party's formation ===
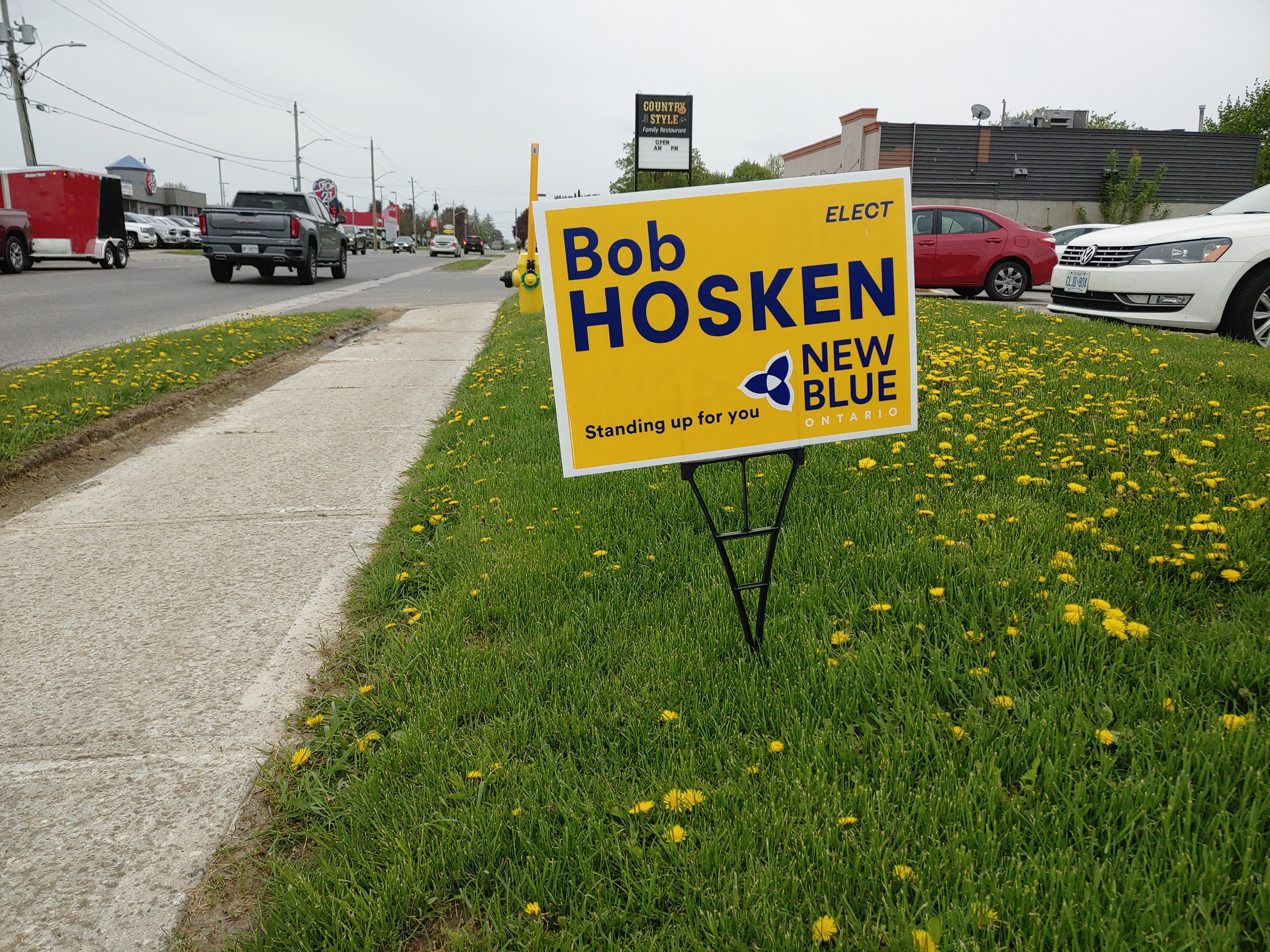
A sign advertising the New Blue Party in the 2022 Ontario general election

On October 12, 2020, Jim and Belinda Karahalios released a video announcing that they were forming a new political party, claiming that the Ontario PC Party was beyond redemption. Stating that there "is no party in the Ontario legislature defending the taxpayer, defending small business, defending places of worship, promoting freedom, promoting democracy or fighting political corruption."

On January 7, 2021, the New Blue Party was officially registered by Elections Ontario with Jim as leader. He stated that the party would focus on supporting the taxpayer, places of worship and small business. Belinda, who became an independent after she was removed from the PC caucus, became the lone MPP for the New Blue Party as of January 18, 2021.

Belinda ran as a New Blue candidate in the 2022 provincial election, but lost her seat, coming in fourth. The party won no seats in the 2022 or 2025 provincial elections.

== Ideology and principles ==
=== Ideology ===
The New Blue Party is a conservative populist party that has been described as being to the right of the Progressive Conservative Party of Ontario from which it split. The party has publicly opposed all measures taken against COVID-19; at least one of the party's candidates for the 2022 Ontario general election took part in the Canada convoy protest.

An article in the Simcoe Reformer described the New Blue party as being against "woke activism" and in favour of removing critical race theory and gender identity from schools.

On tax issues, New Blue is determined to reduce Ontario's Harmonized Sales Tax (HST) from 13% to 10% along with eliminating electrical vehicle subsidies and taking down government subsidized wind turbines in order to reduce the tax burden on Ontarians.

== Former New Blue Party MPPs ==
Member	District	Tenure	Notes
Belinda Karahalios	Cambridge	2021–2022	Previously served as a PC MPP from 2018–2020 and an independent from 2020–2021.

== Election results ==
Election results
Election year	No. of overall votes	% of overall total	No. of candidates run	No. of seats won	+/−	Government
2022	127,180	2.72	123 / 124 †	0 / 124	−1	N/A
2025	80,245	1.60	108 / 124	0 / 124	0	N/A

† One New Blue candidate in Ottawa West—Nepean was deregistered on May 17, 2022, due to Canadian military rules.

=== By-elections ===
By-election	Date	Candidate	Votes	%	Place
Hamilton Centre	March 16, 2023	Lee Weiss Vassor	148	0.85%	5/10
Kanata—Carleton	July 27, 2023	Jennifer Boudreau	636	1.97%	4/6
Scarborough—Guildwood	July 27, 2023	Danielle Height	151	0.97%	5/12
Kitchener Centre	November 30, 2023	Paul Simoes	532	2.25%	5/18
Lambton—Kent—Middlesex	May 2, 2024	Keith Benn	1,515	5.50%	4/8
Milton	May 2, 2024	John Spina	1,102	4.02%	4/9
Bay of Quinte	September 19, 2024	Margaret Schuler	369	0.99%	5/7
Scarborough Southwest	September 3, 2026	Chris Rees	178	0.81%	6/7
York—Simcoe	September 3, 2026	David Ghobrial	383	1.66%	6/7
Hamilton East—Stoney Creek	September 3, 2026	Wieslawa Derlatka	318	1.18%	5/6
