= Cambridge (provincial electoral district) =

Provincial electoral district in Ontario, Canada

Coordinates: 43.348°N 80.335°W

Ontario electoral district
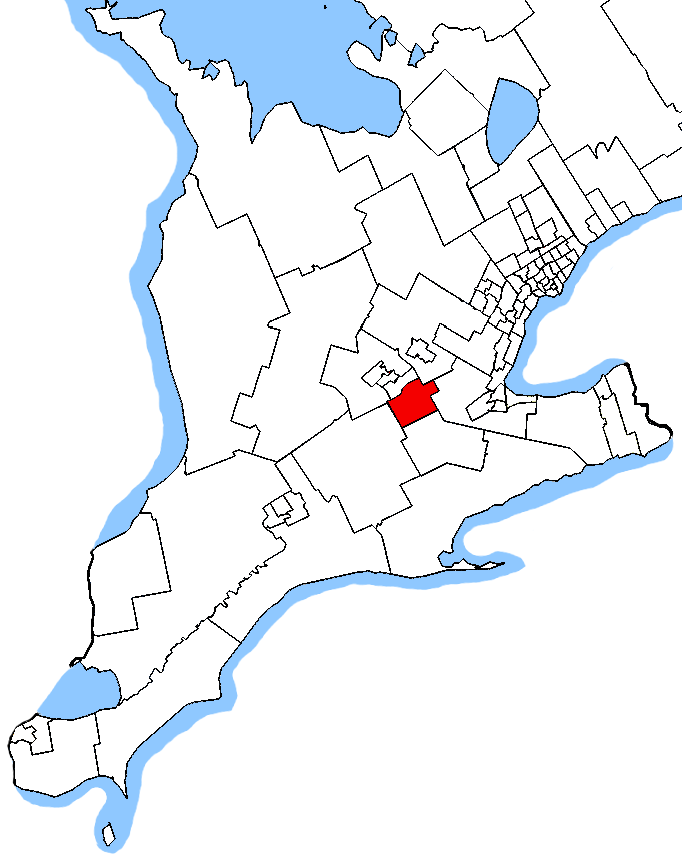
- Cambridge in relation to other southwestern Ontario electoral districts

Provincial electoral district
- Legislature: Legislative Assembly of Ontario
MPP
Brian Riddell
Progressive Conservative
- District created: 1975
- First contested: 1975
- Last contested: 2025

Demographics
- Population (2016): 115,460
- Electors (2018): 88,380
- Area (km²): 355
- Pop. density (per km²): 325.2
- Census division: Waterloo
- Census subdivision(s): Cambridge, North Dumfries

Cambridge is a provincial electoral district in southwestern, Ontario, Canada. It elects one member to the Legislative Assembly of Ontario. It was created in 1975.

From 1987 to 1999, it consisted of the city of Cambridge plus that part the township of North Dumfries located directly to the east of Cambridge.

From 1999 to 2007 it consisted of Cambridge, North Dumfries plus the city of Kitchener east of a line following Homer Watson Boulevard to Doon Village Road to Homer Watson Boulevard again, then to Huron Road to the Grand River.

Since 2007, the riding has included only Cambridge and North Dumfries.

== Members of Provincial Parliament ==
Cambridge
Assembly	Years	Member	Party
Riding created
30th	1975–1977	Monty Davidson	New Democratic
31st	1977–1981	Monty Davidson	New Democratic
32nd	1981–1985	Bill Barlow	Progressive Conservative
33rd	1985–1987	Bill Barlow	Progressive Conservative
34th	1987–1990	Michael Farnan	New Democratic
35th	1990–1995	Michael Farnan	New Democratic
36th	1995–1999	Gerry Martiniuk	Progressive Conservative
37th	1999–2003	Gerry Martiniuk	Progressive Conservative
38th	2003–2007	Gerry Martiniuk	Progressive Conservative
39th	2007–2011	Gerry Martiniuk	Progressive Conservative
40th	2011–2014	Rob Leone	Progressive Conservative
41st	2014–2018	Kathryn McGarry	Liberal
42nd	2018–2020	Belinda Karahalios	Progressive Conservative
42nd	2020–2021	Belinda Karahalios	Independent
42nd	2021–2022	Belinda Karahalios	New Blue
43rd	2022–present	Brian Riddell	Progressive Conservative

== Election results ==
Winning party in each polling division of Cambridge at the 2025 Ontario general election

2025 Ontario general election
Party	Candidate	Votes	%	±%	Expenditures
Progressive Conservative	Brian Riddell	19,210	43.66	+6.63	$79,790
Liberal	Rob Deutschmann	15,131	34.39	+13.69	$75,914
New Democratic	Marjorie Knight	5,074	11.53	–10.66	$10,959
Green	Carla Johnson	2,519	5.72	–3.25	$26,384
New Blue	Belinda Karahalios	2,067	4.70	–6.40	$12,335
Total valid votes/expense limit		44,001	99.44	–	$155,491
Total rejected, unmarked and declined ballots		247	0.56	+0.08	
Turnout		44,248	45.82	+2.60	
Eligible voters		96,578			
Progressive Conservative hold		Swing		–3.53	
Source: Elections Ontario

Winning party in each polling division of Cambridge at the 2022 Ontario general election

2022 Ontario general election
Party	Candidate	Votes	%	±%	Expenditures
Progressive Conservative	Brian Riddell	14,590	37.03	+0.06	$84,737
New Democratic	Marjorie Knight	8,745	22.19	–10.30	$54,806
Liberal	Surekha Shenoy	8,155	20.70	–2.55	$77,446
New Blue	Belinda Karahalios	4,374	11.10	–25.87†	$98,338
Green	Carla Johnson	3,537	8.98	+2.71	$14,902
Total valid votes/expense limit		39,401	99.52	+0.81	$128,747
Total rejected, unmarked and declined ballots		190	0.48	–0.81	
Turnout		39,591	43.22	–11.96	
Eligible voters		91,608			
Progressive Conservative hold		Swing		+5.18	
Source: Elections Ontario † Belinda Karahalios ran as a member of the Progressive Conservative party in the 2018 election. The New Blue party did not exist in 2018, and the percentage loss for the New Blue party is based on the percentage personally lost as a candidate by Karahalios between elections.

2018 Ontario general election
Party	Candidate	Votes	%	±%
Progressive Conservative	Belinda Karahalios	17,793	36.97	+4.41
New Democratic	Marjorie Knight	15,639	32.49	+10.89
Liberal	Kathryn McGarry	11,191	23.25	–15.68
Green	Michele Braniff	3,018	6.27	+0.61
Libertarian	Allan Dettweiler	490	1.02	–0.24
Total valid votes		48,131	98.71	
Total rejected, unmarked and declined ballots		631	1.29	–0.37
Turnout		48,762	55.17	+6.22
Eligible voters		88,380		
Progressive Conservative gain from Liberal		Swing		+10.05
Source: Elections Ontario

2014 Ontario general election
Party	Candidate	Votes	%	±%
Liberal	Kathryn McGarry	18,763	38.93	+5.85
Progressive Conservative	Rob Leone	15,694	32.56	–5.13
New Democratic	Bobbi Stewart	10,413	21.60	–3.01
Green	Temara Brown	2,726	5.66	+3.16
Libertarian	Allan R. Dettweiler	605	1.26	–0.23
Total valid votes		48,201	98.34	
Total rejected, unmarked and declined ballots		814	1.66	+1.22
Turnout		49,015	48.95	+2.91
Eligible voters		100,130		
Liberal gain from Progressive Conservative		Swing		+5.49
Source: Elections Ontario

2011 Ontario general election
Party	Candidate	Votes	%	±%
Progressive Conservative	Rob Leone	15,947	37.69	–4.01
Liberal	Kathryn McGarry	13,993	33.07	–1.10
New Democratic	Atinuke Bankole	10,414	24.61	+10.91
Green	Jacques Malette	1,056	2.50	–6.43
Libertarian	Allan R. Dettweiler	629	1.49	–
Independent	Robert Ross	271	0.64	–
Total valid votes		42,310	99.56	
Total rejected, unmarked and declined ballots		187	0.44	–0.26
Turnout		42,497	46.04	–3.65
Eligible voters		92,310		
Progressive Conservative hold		Swing		–1.45
Source: Elections Ontario

2007 Ontario general election
Party	Candidate	Votes	%	±%	Expenditures
Progressive Conservative	Gerry Martiniuk	17,942	41.70	–0.80	$69,486
Liberal	Kathryn McGarry	14,704	34.17	–1.02	$58,836
New Democratic	Mitchel Healey	5,896	13.70	–4.39	$11,877
Green	Colin Carmichael	3,842	8.93	+6.84	$3,988
Family Coalition	Paul Vandervet	646	1.50	–0.63	$2,915
Total valid votes		43,030	99.30		
Total rejected, unmarked and declined ballots		303	0.70	+0.01	
Turnout		43,333	49.69	–4.10	
Eligible voters		87,203			
Progressive Conservative hold		Swing		+0.11	
Source: Elections Ontario

2003 Ontario general election
Party	Candidate	Votes	%	±%
Progressive Conservative	Gerry Martiniuk	19,996	42.50	–12.35
Liberal	Jerry Boyle	16,559	35.19	+12.34
New Democratic	Pam Wolf	8,513	18.09	–1.28
Family Coalition	Al Smith	1,001	2.13	+0.29
Green	Michael Chownyk	983	2.09	+1.00
Total valid votes		47,052	99.31	
Total rejected, unmarked and declined ballots		327	0.69	–0.03
Turnout		47,379	53.79	–2.29
Eligible voters		88,084		
Progressive Conservative hold		Swing		–12.34
Source: Elections Ontario

1999 Ontario general election
Party	Candidate	Votes	%	±%
Progressive Conservative	Gerry Martiniuk	24,583	54.84	+7.91
Liberal	Jerry Boyle	10,244	22.85	+7.62
New Democratic	Gary Gibson	8,684	19.37	–12.69
Family Coalition	Al Smith	824	1.84	–2.75
Green	Kathleen Morton	489	1.09	–
Total valid votes		44,824	99.28	
Total rejected, unmarked and declined ballots		327	0.72	–0.16
Turnout		45,151	56.08	–3.48
Eligible voters		80,508		
Progressive Conservative hold		Swing		+0.15
Source: Elections Ontario

1995 Ontario general election
Party	Candidate	Votes	%	±%
Progressive Conservative	Gerry Martiniuk	17,269	46.93	+34.63
New Democratic	Mike Farnan	11,797	32.06	–28.22
Liberal	Ben Tucci	5,606	15.24	–5.65
Family Coalition	Al Smith	1,690	4.59	–1.94
Independent	Régent G. Gervais	433	1.18	–
Total valid votes		36,795	99.12	
Total rejected, unmarked and declined ballots		328	0.88	–0.51
Turnout		37,123	59.56	–5.28
Eligible voters		62,324		
Progressive Conservative gain from New Democratic		Swing		+20.14
Source: Elections Ontario

1990 Ontario general election
Party	Candidate	Votes	%	±%	Expenditures
New Democratic	Mike Farnan	21,806	60.28	+25.79	$32,413
Liberal	John K. Bell	7,557	20.89	–13.29	$40,099
Progressive Conservative	Carl DeFaria	4,449	12.30	–14.45	$33,935
Family Coalition	Anneliese Steden	2,364	6.53	+1.95	$11,367
Total valid votes		36,176	98.60		
Total rejected, unmarked and declined ballots		513	1.40	+0.91	
Turnout		36,689	64.84	+1.96	
Eligible voters		56,581			
New Democratic hold		Swing		+19.54	
Source: Elections Ontario

1987 Ontario general election
Party	Candidate	Votes	%	±%	Expenditures
New Democratic	Mike Farnan	11,284	34.49	–3.02	$27,661
Liberal	Claudette Millar	11,183	34.18	+12.01	$42,172
Progressive Conservative	Bill Barlow	8,752	26.75	–13.58	$29,793
Family Coalition	Anneliese Steden	1,500	4.58	–	$8,623
Total valid votes		32,719	99.51		
Total rejected ballots		160	0.49	–0.02	
Turnout		32,879	62.88	+2.76	
Eligible voters		52,289			
New Democratic gain from Progressive Conservative		Swing		–7.52	
Source: Elections Ontario

1985 Ontario general election
Party	Candidate	Votes	%	±%
Progressive Conservative	Bill Barlow	12,888	40.33	–2.49
New Democratic	Alec Dufresne	11,985	37.50	–2.43
Liberal	Bob Jeffrey	7,083	22.16	+6.78
Total valid votes		31,956	99.50	
Total rejected ballots		162	0.50	+0.11
Turnout		32,118	60.11	+0.84
Eligible voters		53,428		
Progressive Conservative hold		Swing		–0.03
Source: Elections Ontario

1981 Ontario general election
Party	Candidate	Votes	%	±%
Progressive Conservative	Bill Barlow	12,597	42.82	+7.37
New Democratic	Monty Davidson	11,748	39.93	+2.63
Liberal	John Giles	4,527	15.39	–11.02
Independent	George Molson Barrett	549	1.87	–
Total valid votes		29,421	99.60	
Total rejected ballots		117	0.40	–0.03
Turnout		29,538	59.27	–5.69
Eligible voters		49,836		
Progressive Conservative gain from New Democratic		Swing		+2.37
Source: Elections Ontario

1977 Ontario general election
Party	Candidate	Votes	%	±%	Expenditures
New Democratic	Monty Davidson	11,120	37.31	–0.83	$12,972
Progressive Conservative	Bill Barlow	10,566	35.45	+6.32	$25,056
Liberal	Claudette Millar	7,870	26.40	–6.34	$22,087
Independent Social Credit	John H. Long	252	0.85	–	$768
Total valid votes		29,808	99.57		
Total rejected ballots		128	0.43	+0.11	
Turnout		29,936	64.96	–1.94	
Eligible voters		46,081			
New Democratic hold		Swing		–3.58	
Source: Elections Ontario

1975 Ontario general election
Party	Candidate	Votes	%
New Democratic	Monty Davidson	11,255	38.14
Liberal	Claudette Millar	9,662	32.74
Progressive Conservative	Ruggles Constant	8,595	29.12
Total valid votes		29,512	99.68
Total rejected ballots		95	0.32
Turnout		29,607	66.90
Eligible voters		44,253	
New Democratic pickup new district.			
Source: Elections Ontario

== 2007 electoral reform referendum ==
2007 Ontario electoral reform referendum
Side	Votes	%
First Past the Post	25,902	61.4
Mixed member proportional	16,260	38.6
Total valid votes	42,162	100.0

== See also ==
- List of Ontario provincial electoral districts
- Canadian provincial electoral districts
