= Barrie—Innisfil (provincial electoral district) =

Provincial electoral district in Ontario, Canada

Coordinates: 44.348°N 79.665°W

Ontario electoral district
- Barrie—Innisfil in relation to nearby electoral districts

Provincial electoral district
- Legislature: Legislative Assembly of Ontario
MPP
Andrea Khanjin
Progressive Conservative
- District created: 2015
- First contested: 2018
- Last contested: 2025

Demographics
- Population (2016): 109,285
- Electors (2018): 82,557
- Area (km²): 382
- Pop. density (per km²): 286.1
- Census division: Simcoe County
- Census subdivision(s): Barrie, Innisfil

Barrie—Innisfil is a provincial electoral district in Ontario, Canada. It elects one member to the Legislative Assembly of Ontario. The riding was created in 2015 from portions of Barrie and York—Simcoe ridings, and it is congruent with the new federal riding of the same name.

This provincial riding is more conservative and has only ever been won by the PCs.

== Members of Provincial Parliament ==
Barrie—Innisfil
Assembly	Years	Member	Party
Riding created from Barrie and York—Simcoe
42nd	2018–2022	Andrea Khanjin	Progressive Conservative
43rd	2022–2025	Andrea Khanjin	Progressive Conservative
44th	2025–present	Andrea Khanjin	Progressive Conservative

== Election results ==
Winning party in each polling division of Barrie—Innisfil at the 2025 Ontario general election

2025 Ontario general election
Party	Candidate	Votes	%	±%
Progressive Conservative	Andrea Khanjin	22,048	54.11	+3.87
Liberal	Dane Lee	10,613	26.05	+7.95
New Democratic	Andrew Harrigan	5,442	13.36	–5.78
Green	Stephen Ciesielski	1,655	4.06	–2.25
New Blue	Sam Mangiapane	814	2.00	–1.37
Moderate	Anna Yuryeva	174	0.43	–
Total valid votes		40,746	99.32	
Total rejected, unmarked and declined ballots		278	0.68	+0.05
Turnout		41,024	41.30	+1.69
Eligible voters		99,332		
Progressive Conservative hold		Swing		▼2.05
Source: Elections Ontario

Winning party in each polling division of Barrie—Innisfil at the 2022 Ontario general election

2022 Ontario general election
Party	Candidate	Votes	%	±%
Progressive Conservative	Andrea Khanjin	18,225	50.25	+0.28
New Democratic	Pekka Reinio	6,942	19.14	–9.46
Liberal	John Olthuis	6,564	18.10	+5.58
Green	Bonnie North	2,291	6.32	–0.89
New Blue	Ashlyn Steele	1,220	3.36	–
Ontario Party	Grace Dean	764	2.11	–
Independent	Benjamin Hughes	147	0.41	–
People's Front	Jake Tucker	119	0.33	–0.09
Total valid votes		36,272	99.38	
Total rejected, unmarked and declined ballots		228	0.62	–0.57
Turnout		36,500	39.61	–14.66
Eligible voters		92,137		
Progressive Conservative hold		Swing		▲4.87
Source: Elections Ontario

2018 Ontario general election
Party	Candidate	Votes	%
Progressive Conservative	Andrea Khanjin	22,121	49.97
New Democratic	Pekka Reinio	12,661	28.60
Liberal	Ann Hoggarth	5,543	12.52
Green	Bonnie North	3,190	7.21
Libertarian	Brett Dorion	396	0.89
Canadians' Choice	Jake Tucker	184	0.42
Trillium	Stacey Surkova	118	0.27
Moderate	Alexander Ryzhykh	59	0.13
Total valid votes		44,272	98.81
Total rejected, unmarked and declined ballots		534	1.19
Turnout		44,806	54.27
Eligible voters		82,557	
Progressive Conservative pickup new district.			
Source: Elections Ontario

2014 general election redistributed results
Party	Vote	%
Progressive Conservative	14,243	38.91
Liberal	13,733	37.51
New Democratic	6,211	16.97
Green	2,131	5.82
Others	290	0.79

== See also ==
- List of Ontario provincial electoral districts
- Canadian provincial electoral districts
