= Ann Hoggarth =

Canadian politician

Member of the Ontario Provincial Parliament for Barrie
- In office June 12, 2014 – June 7, 2018
- Preceded by: Rod Jackson
- Succeeded by: Riding dissolved

Personal details
- Born: 1950 (age 75–76) Barrie, Ontario
- Party: Liberal
- Occupation: Teacher

E. Ann Hoggarth (born c. 1950) is a former politician in Ontario, Canada. She was a Liberal member of the Legislative Assembly of Ontario from 2014 to 2018 who represented the riding of Barrie.

== Background ==
Hoggarth was born and raised in Barrie, Ontario. She was an elementary school teacher at Allandale Heights Public School and Terry Fox Elementary School both in Barrie, and a past president of the Simcoe County Elementary Teachers' Federation.

Ann is the former president of the Barrie Skating Club, a position she held for 7 years. Working alongside Doug Leigh and city council, the Mariposa School of Skating was moved to its new home at the Allandale Recreation Centre. Ann was also involved in the community discussions that resulted in the successful completion of the Barrie Molson Centre.

Ann was awarded the Queen's Jubilee Award in 2003 for her hard work and dedication in the community and the education sector.

== Politics ==
Hoggarth ran in the June 2014 provincial election as the Liberal candidate in the riding of Barrie. She defeated Progressive Conservative incumbent Rod Jackson by 2,248 votes. In the 2018 election, she was defeated by PC candidate Andrea Khanjin in the new riding of Barrie—Innisfil.

She served as the Chair of the Standing Committee on Finance & Economic Affairs and was the Parliamentary Assistant to the Ministry of Community and Social Services.

== Election results ==
2014 Ontario general election: Barrie
Party	Candidate	Votes	%	±%
Liberal	Ann Hoggarth	19,916	40.69	+5.88
Progressive Conservative	Rod Jackson	17,667	36.10	–4.56
New Democratic	David Bradbury	7,975	16.29	–2.66
Green	Bonnie North	3,018	6.17	+1.74
Libertarian	Darren Roskam	366	0.75	+0.01
Total valid votes		48,942	98.37	
Total rejected, unmarked and declined ballots		811	1.63	+1.21
Turnout		49,753	49.18	+3.18
Eligible voters		101,169		
Liberal gain from Progressive Conservative		Swing		+5.22
Source: Elections Ontario
