= Rod Jackson (politician) =

Canadian politician

Ontario MPP
- In office 2011–2014
- Preceded by: Aileen Carroll
- Succeeded by: Ann Hoggarth
- Constituency: Barrie

Personal details
- Born: 1970 (age 55–56)
- Party: Progressive Conservative
- Children: 2

Rod Jackson (born c. 1970) is a Canadian former politician in Ontario. He was elected to Barrie City Council in 2006 and served until 2010. He was a Progressive Conservative member of the Legislative Assembly of Ontario from 2011 to 2014 who represented the riding of Barrie. He was the CEO of the Greater Barrie Chamber of Commerce from 2016 to 2017. He is now the President of iPi inc. a public affairs firm.

== Background ==
Prior to his entry into politics, Jackson was a human resources consultant and professional mediator. He lives in Barrie with his wife and their two children.

== Politics ==
In 2004, Jackson ran for the Conservative nomination as the candidate in 2004 federal election and 2006 federal election in the riding of Barrie. He lost to Patrick Brown. Brown went on to beat Liberal Aileen Carroll in 2006.

After Jackson lost the nomination, he was elected in 2006 to replace Brown as the city councillor for Barrie. He was and continued in the position until 2011. He ran in 2011 provincial election to replace Aileen Carroll. Carroll, after losing federally went on to win the provincial riding of Barrie, served for one term and then decided to retire. Jackson defeated Liberal candidate Karl Walsh by 2,521 votes. He was party critic for the 2015 Pan American Games and critic for community and social services.

In September 2013, Jackson was accused of terminating a part-time employee citing insufficient funds and then advertising the same position as an unpaid internship. Jackson said the accusation was, "patently untrue." The Ministry of Labour was called in to investigate the situation. After an initial investigation by the Ministry of Labour the allegations against Jackson were proven to lack substance and the complaint was not pursued by the Ministry.

In the June 2014 provincial election, Jackson was defeated by Liberal candidate Ann Hoggarth. Jackson attributed his loss to provincial unions. He said, "I think the unions misrepresented what we were talking about and we paid the price."

Jackson ran for the Conservative nomination as the candidate in the 2015 federal election. In July 2015, he was lost the nomination to City Councilor John Brassard who went on to win the riding.

Jackson introduced two Bills during his tenure, the "Blocker Ban Bill", Bill 88, which looked to ban the proactive use of foam blockers by workers responsible for caring for autistic children and young adults. The second Bill titled "Youth Right to Care", Bill 102, was introduced to protect 16 and 17 year old children entering care for the first time and closed an age old gap that prevented these children from accessing welfare services from the province. The Bill received all party unanimous support.

== Electoral history ==
2014 Ontario general election: Barrie
| Party | Candidate | Votes | % | ±% |
|---|---|---|---|---|
| Liberal | Ann Hoggarth | 19,916 | 40.69 | +5.88 |
| Progressive Conservative | Rod Jackson | 17,667 | 36.10 | –4.56 |
| New Democratic | David Bradbury | 7,975 | 16.29 | –2.66 |
| Green | Bonnie North | 3,018 | 6.17 | +1.74 |
| Libertarian | Darren Roskam | 366 | 0.75 | +0.01 |
| Total valid votes | | 48,942 | 98.37 | |
| Total rejected, unmarked and declined ballots | | 811 | 1.63 | +1.21 |
| Turnout | | 49,753 | 49.18 | +3.18 |
| Eligible voters | | 101,169 | | |
| Liberal gain from Progressive Conservative | | Swing | | +5.22 |
Source: Elections Ontario

2011 Ontario general election: Barrie
| Party | Candidate | Votes | % | ±% |
|---|---|---|---|---|
| Progressive Conservative | Rod Jackson | 17,527 | 40.66 | +1.44 |
| Liberal | Karl Walsh | 15,006 | 34.81 | –7.39 |
| New Democratic | Myrna Clark | 8,171 | 18.95 | +10.97 |
| Green | Andrew Miller | 1,909 | 4.43 | –5.04 |
| Libertarian | Darren Adrian Roskam | 318 | 0.74 | +0.37 |
| Freedom | Matthew MacKenzie | 179 | 0.42 | – |
| Total valid votes | | 43,110 | 99.58 | |
| Total rejected, unmarked and declined ballots | | 181 | 0.42 | –0.02 |
| Turnout | | 43,291 | 46.00 | –5.95 |
| Eligible voters | | 94,114 | | |
| Progressive Conservative gain from Liberal | | Swing | | +4.41 |
Source: Elections Ontario
