= Aileen Carroll =

Canadian politician (1944–2020)

The Honourable Aileen Carroll PC

Ontario Minister of Culture
- In office October 30, 2007 – January 18, 2010
- Premier: Dalton McGuinty
- Preceded by: Caroline Di Cocco
- Succeeded by: Michael Chan (Tourism and Culture)

Minister for International Cooperation
- In office December 12, 2003 – February 5, 2006
- Prime Minister: Paul Martin
- Preceded by: Susan Whelan
- Succeeded by: Josée Verner

Member of Parliament for Barrie
- In office October 10, 2007 – October 6, 2011
- Preceded by: Joe Tascona
- Succeeded by: Rod Jackson

Member of Parliament for Barrie (Barrie—Simcoe—Bradford; 1997-2004)
- In office June 2, 1997 – January 23, 2006
- Preceded by: Ed Harper
- Succeeded by: Patrick Brown

Personal details
- Born: Margaret Aileen O'Leary; June 1, 1944 Halifax, Nova Scotia, Canada
- Died: April 19, 2020 (aged 75) Barrie, Ontario, Canada
- Party: Liberal
- Spouse: D. Kevin Carroll (m. 1968)
- Children: 2
- Occupation: Politician; businesswoman

Margaret Aileen Carroll PC (née O'Leary; June 1, 1944 – April 19, 2020) was a Canadian politician. She served as a member of the House of Commons from 1997 to 2006 who represented the ridings of Barrie—Simcoe—Bradford and Barrie. She served in the cabinet of Prime Minister Paul Martin as Minister for International Cooperation. From 2007 to 2011 she was a Liberal member of the Legislative Assembly of Ontario. She served in the cabinet of Premier Dalton McGuinty as Minister of Culture.

== Education ==
Carroll had a Bachelor of Arts from Saint Mary's University (1965) and a Bachelor of Education from York University (1989). She was a partner in a small manufacturing and retail business.

== Politics ==
=== Municipal ===
Carroll began her career in politics as a Barrie City councillor, representing the downtown Barrie ward.

=== Federal ===
In 1997, Carroll won the Liberal nomination for the newly created riding of Barrie—Simcoe—Bradford. She went on to win the 1997 election by 7,507 votes, and was re-elected again in 2000. She was elected in 2004 in the newly created riding of Barrie.

Carroll served as Parliamentary Secretary of Foreign Affairs from 2001 to 2003. Carroll was appointed as Minister for International Cooperation, responsible for the Canadian International Development Agency, when Paul Martin became Prime Minister on December 12, 2003. She was the first, and to date only, federal cabinet minister from Barrie. She retained that portfolio until the Liberals were defeated in 2006, when she lost her seat to her 2004 challenger Patrick Brown.

Carroll was a supporter of Paul Martin's leadership bid leading up to the 2003 Liberal Party of Canada leadership election. Carroll supported Michael Ignatieff during the 2006 Liberal Party of Canada leadership election, serving as his Ontario campaign co-chair with former DFAIT cabinet colleague Jim Peterson.

=== Provincial ===
In 2007, she ran as the Liberal candidate in the provincial riding of Barrie for the 2007 provincial election and defeated incumbent MPP Joe Tascona. She was appointed to provincial cabinet of Premier Dalton McGuinty as Minister of Culture and as Minister Responsible for Seniors shortly after that election. She was relieved of her cabinet posts in January 2010. In 2011, she announced she would not run for re-election in the riding of Barrie.

After her term as an MPP, she continued her association with the Liberal party, serving as vice president to the Barrie riding association. In 2012, she supported Kathleen Wynne in the 2013 leadership election.

== Personal life ==
Carroll married D. Kevin Carroll QC in 1968. He had served as the president of the Canadian Bar Association from 2009 to 2010. They had two grown children, Daniel and Joanna. She died on April 19, 2020, at the age of 75.

== Electoral record ==
1997 Canadian federal election: Barrie—Simcoe—Bradford
Party	Candidate	Votes	%
Liberal	Aileen Carroll	23,549	43.28
Reform	Bonnie Ainsworth	16,042	29.62
Progressive Conservative	John Trotter	10,735	19.82
New Democratic	Peggy McComb	2,580	4.76
Green	Marie Sternberg	506	0.93
Christian Heritage	Dan Vander Kooi	421	0.78
Canadian Action	Ian Woods	327	0.60

2000 Canadian federal election: Barrie—Simcoe—Bradford
Party	Candidate	Votes	%
Liberal	Aileen Carroll	26,309	48.27
Alliance	Rob Hamilton	17,600	32.29
Progressive Conservative	Jane MacLaren	7,588	13.92
New Democratic	Keith Lindsay	2,385	4.38
Canadian Action	Ian Woods	387	0.71
Christian Heritage	Brian K. White	234	0.43

2004 Canadian federal election: Barrie
Party	Candidate	Votes	%
Liberal	Aileen Carroll	21,233	42.7%
Conservative	Patrick Brown	19,938	40.1%
New Democratic	Peter Bursztyn	5,312	10.7%
Green	Erich Jacoby-Hawkins	3,288	6.6%

2006 Canadian federal election: Barrie
Party	Candidate	Votes	%	±%	Expenditures
Conservative	Patrick Brown	23,999	41.9%	+1.8%	$81,530
Liberal	Aileen Carroll	22,476	39.2%	-3.5%	$69,313
New Democratic	Peter Bursztyn	6,984	12.2%	+1.5%	$14,496
Green	Erich Jacoby-Hawkins	3,874	6.8%	+0.2%	$19,036

2007 Ontario general election: Barrie
Party	Candidate	Votes	%
Liberal	Aileen Carroll	19,548	42.20
Progressive Conservative	Joe Tascona	18,167	39.22
Green	Erich Jacoby-Hawkins	4,385	9.47
New Democratic	Larry Taylor	3,700	7.99
Family Coalition	Roberto Sales	173	0.37
Libertarian	Paolo Fabrizio	168	0.36
Independent	Darren Adrian Roskam	102	0.22
Independent	Daniel Gray Predie	77	0.17
Total valid votes		46,320	99.57
Total rejected, unmarked and declined ballots		202	0.43
Turnout		46,522	51.95
Eligible voters		89,548	
Liberal pickup new district.			
Source: Elections Ontario

27th Canadian Ministry (2003–2006) – Cabinet of Paul Martin
Cabinet post (1)
Predecessor	Office	Successor
Susan Whelan	Minister for International Cooperation; 2003–2006	Josée Verner

McGuinty ministry, Province of Ontario (2003–2013)
Cabinet post (1)
Predecessor	Office	Successor
Caroline DiCocco	Minister of Culture; 2007–2010; Also Responsible for Seniors	Michael Chan
