= 2014 Ontario general election =

Canadian provincial general election

- June 12, 2014

107 seats in the Legislative Assembly of Ontario 54 seats needed for a majority
- Turnout: 51.3% (▲3.1pp)
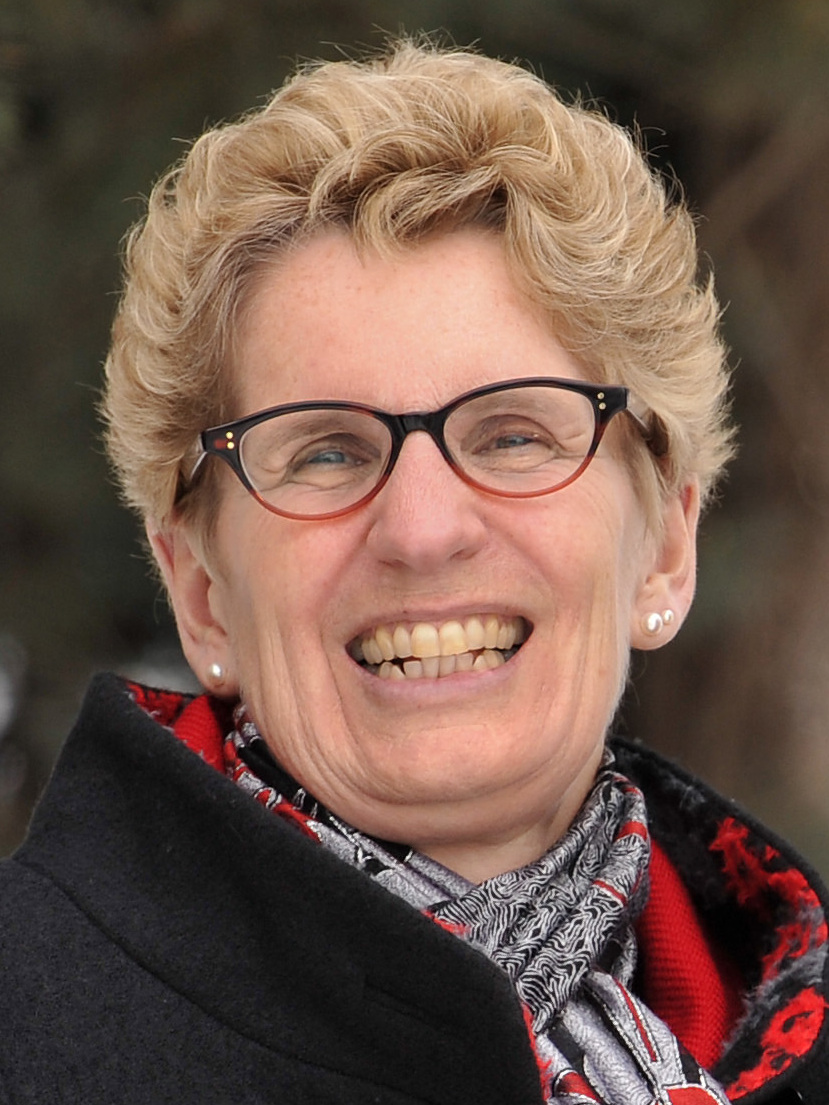

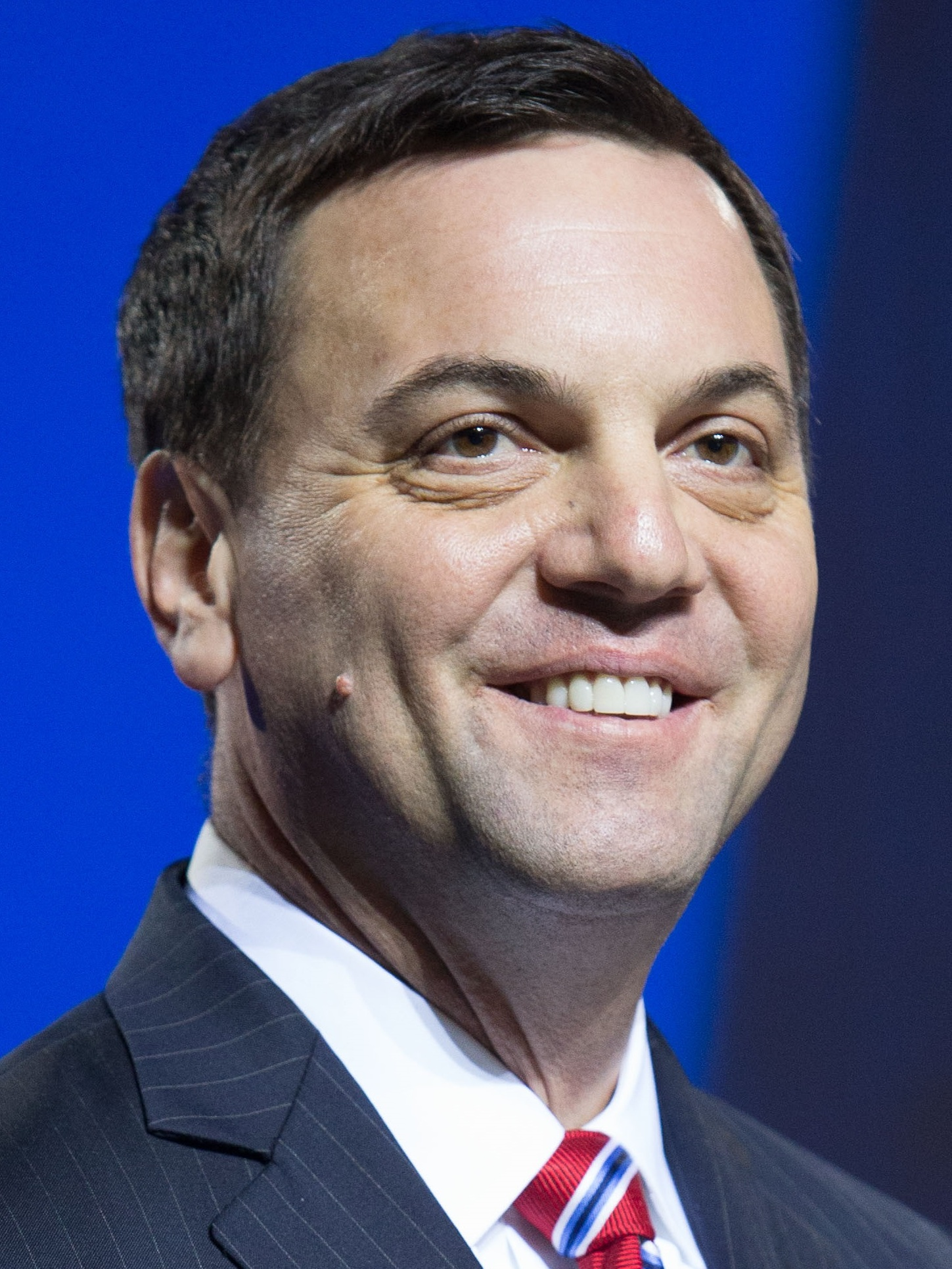

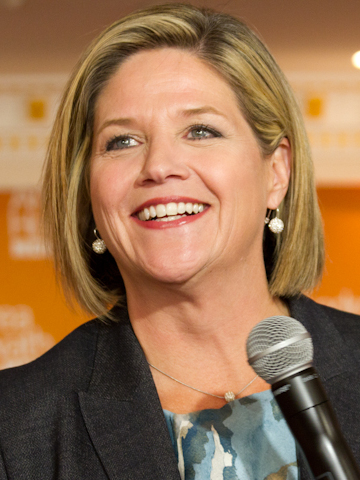
	First party	Second party	Third party
Leader	Kathleen Wynne	Tim Hudak	Andrea Horwath
Party	Liberal	Progressive Conservative	New Democratic
Leader since	January 26, 2013	June 27, 2009	March 7, 2009
Leader's seat	Don Valley West	Niagara West—Glanbrook	Hamilton Centre
Last election	53 seats, 37.65%	37 seats, 35.45%	17 seats, 22.74%
Seats before	48	37	21
Seats won	58	28	21
Seat change	▲10	▼9	Steady
Popular vote	1,863,974	1,505,436	1,144,822
Percentage	38.67%	31.23%	23.75%
Swing	▲1.02pp	▼4.22pp	▲1.01pp
- Popular vote by riding. As this is an FPTP election, seat totals are not determined by popular vote, but instead via results by each riding. Riding names are listed at the bottom.
Premier before election
Kathleen Wynne
Liberal
Premier after election
Kathleen Wynne
Liberal

General elections were held in Ontario, Canada on June 12, 2014, to elect the members of the 41st Parliament of Ontario. The Liberal Party won a majority of seats in the legislature, allowing its leader, Kathleen Wynne, to continue as premier, moving from a minority to majority government. This was the Liberals' fourth consecutive win since 2003 and an improvement from their performance in the 2011 election. The Progressive Conservatives under Tim Hudak were returned to the official opposition; following the election loss, Hudak announced his resignation as Progressive Conservative leader. The New Democratic Party under Andrea Horwath remained in third place, albeit with an improved share of the popular vote.

The election was called on May 2, 2014, by Lieutenant Governor David Onley, upon the recommendation of Wynne following the announcement that the NDP, whose support was critical to the survival of the Liberals' minority government in the Legislative Assembly, would vote against the Liberals' proposed budget.

With the election, Wynne became the first woman and the first openly gay person to lead a party to a majority victory in an Ontario general election.

== Context - 40th Parliament ==
The preceding election held in October 2011 reduce the incumbent Liberal ministry led by Dalton McGuinty from a government with a comfortable 35-seat majority to a minority government that was one seat short, the first minority government in almost a quarter-century.

One of the most contentious issues during that election campaign was a mid-campaign decision to scrap unpopular gas plants being constructed in Mississauga and Oakville. The move was viewed by many as cynically made to improve the Liberal Party's chances of retaining the five ridings it held in the area. Whether that was the motivation or not, the Liberal did retained those seats.

The political dynamic of the legislature changed significantly by the resulted minority parliament. The government was forced to seek support from opposition members on a vote-by-vote basis. The government's control over parliamentary schedule and work of committees were significantly diminished. It could not stop committees from issuing order compelling sensitive documents. Emboldened by their newfound ability embarrassed the government, the opposition demanded all documents related to the gas plant cancellation be released to the public. The released document revealed the cost of the cancellation was estimated to be $950 million to $1.1 billion over approximately 20 years. In the fall of 2012. Energy minister Chris Bentley was cited in contempt of upon reports of an additional 20,000 documents relating to the gas plants not having been release.

Two veterans of the legislature, former finance minister Greg Sorbara and former PC Deputy Premier Elizabeth Witmer, resigned in the first year of the 40th parliament. The Liberals had hoped to regain their majority by winning Whitmer's seat for Kitchener—Waterloo. The riding was targeted by various teachers unions in protest of the government imposing contracts and suspending their right to strike. After an exceptionally acrimonious byelection campaign, the seat went to the NDP, with the Liberals placing third.

McGuinty unexpectedly announced on October 15, 2012, that he was ending the legislative session by proroguing the legislature and that he would resign as premier as soon as the Liberal Party chose his successor, in January 2013. The ensuing Ontario Liberal leadership contest, the first such contest held by a governing party since 1984, resulted in Kathleen Wynne being elected the first woman and the first LGBT person serve as Premier of Ontario.

=== The march to the 2014 election ===
The following table lists events most directly relevant in setting the dynamic of the 2014 general election.

Date	Event
October 6, 2011	Election held for members of the Ontario Legislature in the 40th Legislative Assembly of Ontario.
Spring of 2012	Finance minister Dwight Duncan tabled the government's first minority budget in March, a budget the government could not approve on its own. PC leader Tim Hudak's outright rejection of it meant some concession to the NDP caucus would be required. NDP Leader Andrea Horwath makes several demands in exchange for her party to support but secured little concession. In June, Premier Dalton McGuinty threatened to call another election if the budget is not passed, at which point the NDP opted to abstain, avoiding a summer election.
September 6, 2012	Two byelection held, future party leader Steven Del Duca succeeding his mentor former finance minister Greg Sorbora, while NDP secure an upset victory, picking up the seat of former PC deputy premier Elizabeth Witmer following an exceptionally acrimonious local campaign.
October 15, 2012	Dalton McGuinty announced his resignation as Premier of Ontario and as Leader of the Ontario Liberal Party.
January 26, 2013	Kathleen Wynne elected Ontario Liberal leader at the party's leadership convention. This would be the last delegated convention in Canada where the elected leader also automatically become a first minister.
February 11, 2013	Premier Dalton McGuinty formally tendered the resignation of the McGuinty ministry, and was succeeded by the Wynne ministry. Wynne sworn in as Ontario's first female premier and the first out LGBT person to serve as first minister in Canada.
February 20, 2013	The 40th parliament reconvened for the opening of its second session, with the government at a three-seat deficit from majority following the retirement of finance minister Dwight Duncan and former energy minister Chris Bentley.
June 2013	The Wynne ministry passed its first budget with the support of the NDP.
August 1, 2013	By-elections was held in five electoral districts all previously held by minister of the McGuinty ministry, the most by-election contests held on a single day since 1984 (Note: to fill vacancies left by four Liberals, including future Deputy Prime Minister Sheila Copps, and NDP leader Michael Cassidy who left to seek federal seats in the 1984 Canadian federal election.), and the most byelection contests to be defended by a party in Ontario history. (Note: Discounting ministerial byelections, which were often held on a single day and were often not contested by the opposition parties.) The Liberals lost three of the five seats, losing Duncan's Windsor seat and Bentley's London seat to the NDP by wide margin.
May 2, 2014	With both Progressive Conservative leader Tim Hudak and NDP leader Andrea Horwath having signaled their caucus' intention to vote against Wynne ministry's second budget, Wynne pre-empted the confidence vote by seeking dissolution of the legislature from Lieutenant Governor David Onley. Writs of elections were issued for general election to be held on June 12, 2014.
June 12, 2014	The Liberal Party wins a majority, claiming 58 ridings in the Ontario election. Tim Hudak announced that he is stepping down from his leadership of the PC party. Later in June a judicial recount award the Thornhill seat, declared for the Liberal on election night, to the Progressive Conservatives.

=== Changes in party standing and membership ===
Summary of changes in party standing
Party	2011	Decreases ▼			Increases ▲		2014
Party	Elxn	Rsg	death	Cross	Held	Gain	diss.
Liberal	53	(8)			3		48
Progressive Conservative	37	(2)			1	1	37
New Democratic	17					4	21
Vacant	–	10			(4)	(5)	1
Total	107						107

Electoral district	Before			After seat changed hands			
Electoral district	Date	Reason	Member exited	New Member	Date	Event	Note
Kitchener—Waterloo	April 27, 2012	Resignation (Note: Upon appointed chair of the Workplace Safety & Insurance Board)	Elizabeth Witmer	Catherine Fife	Sep 6, 2012	byelection	minus
Vaughan	August 1, 2012	Resignation (Note: Retirement from politics)	Greg Sorbara	Steven Del Duca	Sep 6, 2012	byelection	
London West	Feb 14, 2013	Resignation (Note: retirement from politics upon resignation of the McGuinty ministry)	Chris Bentley	Peggy Sattler	August 1, 2013	byelection	minus
Windsor—Tecumseh	Feb 14, 2013	Resignation	Dwight Duncan	Percy Hatfield	August 1, 2013	byelection	minus
Ottawa South	June 12, 2013	Resignation	Dalton McGuinty	John Fraser	August 1, 2013	byelection	
Scarborough—Guildwood	June 27, 2013	Resignation	Margarett Best	Mitzie Hunter	August 1, 2013	byelection	
Etobicoke—Lakeshore	July 2, 2013	Resignation (Note: Family moved to Nova Scotia)	Laurel Broten	Doug Holyday	August 1, 2013	byelection	minus
Niagara Falls	Sep 24, 2013	Resignation	Kim Craitor	Wayne Gates	Feb 13, 2014	byelection	minus
Thornhill	Dec 31, 2013	Resignation	Peter Shurman	Gila Martow	Feb 13, 2014	byelection	
Brampton—Springdale	March 25, 2014	Resignation (Note: Resigned to seek election as Mayor of Brampton)	Linda Jeffrey	Vacant at dissolution		n/a	

==== Incumbents declined seeking re-election ====
With numerous veterans of the McGuinty ministry having resigned during the 40th Parliament, the number of incumbent retiring at the general election was relatively small. Seven incumbent MPPs opted not to seek re-election in 2014. Five Liberals, four having served in the McGuinty ministry, announced their intention not to seek re-election months in advance of the general election, though there were reported effort in asking some of them to reconsider. Former Conservative minister Frank Klees, a one-time leadership rival to Conservative leader Tim Hudak, and long time MPP John O'Toole, father of then federal minister and future national Conservative Party leader Erin O'Toole rounded out the list of seven.

These retirement resulted in three seats changing hands. The governing Liberals picked up the seats of both retiring conservatives, both located in the Greater Toronto Area, in upset victories. While not unexpected, their loss of Sudbury, held by former minister Rick Bartolucci since 1995, was viewed as proof point for the star power of incumbency especially in communities outside of Toronto and Ottawa. The electoral district of Sudbury and the Liberals pursuit in building incumbency advantage would become a major storyline in the 41st parliament.

Electoral district	Incumbent at dissolution and subsequent nominee		New MPP
Durham	John O'Toole	Mike Patrick	Granville Anderson
Etobicoke Centre	Donna Cansfield	Yvan Baker	Yvan Baker
Kingston and the Islands	John Gerretsen	Sophie Kiwala	Sophie Kiwala
Kitchener Centre	John Milloy	Daiene Vernile	Daiene Vernile
Newmarket—Aurora	Frank Klees	Jane Twinney	Chris Ballard
Ottawa—Orléans	Phil McNeely	Marie-France Lalonde	Marie-France Lalonde
Sudbury	Rick Bartolucci	Andrew Olivier	Joe Cimino

All 21 NDP incumbents, along with 43 incumbent Liberals and 35 incumbent Progressive Conservatives, stood in the General Election.

== Top level summary of election outcome ==
This table tracked the key changes in parliarmary dynicmic in the lead up to the election, and provide a summary of the election results for the four main parties, together having captured 98.5% of the popular votes. More detailed results and more extensive analysis can be found in sections below, following the section covering the election campaign.

↓
58	28	21
Liberal	PC	NDP

Party	Leader	40th Parliament					41st		2014 pop. votes			
Party	Leader	2011 Elxn	2012 Oct	2013 Feb	2014 Feb	dis.	2014 Elxn	Δ	#	# Δ	%	% Δ
Liberal	Kathleen Wynne	53	53	51	49	48	58	5 ▲	1,863,974	238,872 ▲	38.67	1.02 ▲
Progressive Conservative	Tim Hudak	37	36	36	37	37	28	9 ▼	1,505,436	24,640 ▼	31.23	4.22 ▼
New Democratic	Andrea Horwath	17	18	18	20	21	21	4 ▲	1,144,822	168,573 ▲	23.75	1.01 ▲
Green	Mike Schreiner	–				–	–	Steady	235,911	109,890 ▲	4.89	1.97 ▲
Other	(Sum of) (Note: 187 other candidates were on the ballots of 93 electoral districts)	–	–	(Note: vacancy)2	2	1	–	Steady	70,404	11,470 ▲	1.46	0.22 ▲
	Total Valid								4,820,547	504,165 ▲		
	Rejected/Unmarked								35,009	16,909 ▲	(Note: % of total voter turnout)0.72	0.30 ▲
	Declined								29,937	27,602 ▲	0.61	0.05 ▲
References:	Turnout								4,885,493	548,676 ▲	51.29	3.11 ▲
Elections Ontario	Registered Voters								9,526,031	525,656 ▲		5.84 ▲

== Campaign ==
=== Issues ===
==== Economy ====
Unemployment in Ontario was a major political issue. In particular, the manufacturing sector had shrunk by about 30% or more than 300,000 jobs since 2002.

The Progressive Conservative Party of Ontario proposed a plan called "Million Jobs Plan", outlining their strategy for job creation and economic growth. By reducing tax, government services, energy costs and regulations the PCs projected to create a cumulative 507,488 jobs over eight years. The plan also called for the reduction of 100,000 civil service jobs. Economists and critics noted fundamental mathematical errors with the PCs' projections. They held, even if the PCs' own data were correctly tabulated, only 50,000 extra jobs would be created (in addition to the 500,000 that would be created anyway without any policy change).

The Ontario Liberal Party proposed the 10 year "Jobs and Investment Plan", which proposed infrastructure investments as their main strategy to create jobs.

The Ontario New Democratic Party platform called for targeted tax credits and incentives to encourage job creation.

The Green Party of Ontario policy proposal stated that it would "focus on your job by lowering payroll taxes for small businesses" as well as investing in transit infrastructure and subsidising energy-saving home improvements.

The Ontario Libertarian Party called for mass privatization, lower taxes and general deregulation, eliminating many business requirements such as permitting, insurance and certification that they considered to be interfering with job creation. Their platform called for government spending to be limited to "only core functions of government; defending life, liberty, and property" and as such would have eliminated industry subsidies or incentives of any kind, particularly in the energy sector.

The Communist Party of Ontario called for raising the minimum wage to $19/hr as well as introducing a guaranteed annual income, nationalization of the domestic steel industry, and investments in public housing, infrastructure and social programs, while shifting taxes from lower to higher income-earners and businesses.

=== Transit ===
Due to rapid urban and suburban expansion in southern Ontario, traffic congestion had been increasing greatly. A 2013 study by the CD Howe Institute determined that it was costing $7.5-11 billion annually for the economy of Toronto alone.

The Liberals promised $29 billion in infrastructure spending, $15 billion of which would go towards building new transit (mostly LRT) lines in the GTHA, based on the outline of Metrolinx's The Big Move plan, as well as an LRT in Ottawa. A high-speed rail line crossing the province from the southeast into Quebec was also planned. The PCs promised to finish building the Eglinton Crosstown, but cancel all the other planned lines, and instead focus on quickly expanding GO service. The NDP plan was similar to the Liberal plan, but included an extra $1 billion to get certain projects built faster.

=== Endorsements ===
==== Media endorsements ====
The following media outlets made endorsements during the campaign:

Liberal
- Toronto Star
- Now
- Torontoist
Progressive Conservative
- Burlington Post, The Flamborough Review, Oakville Beaver (Note: Same editorial printed in several papers)
- The Globe and Mail (Note: endorsing a minority government)
- National Post
- Ottawa Citizen
- Toronto Sun, Ottawa Sun (Note: Identical editorial printed in multiple cities)
- Windsor Star
New Democratic Party
- Sudbury Star

Explicitly not endorsing any party

- Hamilton Spectator
- The Kitchener-Waterloo Record

==== Public figure endorsements ====
- Deputy Mayor of Toronto, and acting mayor, Norm Kelly endorsed Liberal leader Kathleen Wynne.
- Mayor of Mississauga, Hazel McCallion endorsed Liberal leader Kathleen Wynne.
- Mayor of Kitchener, Carl Zehr endorsed Liberal leader Kathleen Wynne.

== Elections Results ==
Results of the 2014 Ontario general election
Party	Party leader	Cand.	Seats				Popular vote			
Party	Party leader	Cand.	2011	dis.	2014	minus	#	minus	%	minus
Liberal	Kathleen Wynne	107	53	48	58	5 ▲	1,863,974	238,872 ▲	38.67	1.02 ▲
Progressive Conservative	Tim Hudak	107	37	37	28	9 ▼	1,505,436	24,640 ▼	31.23	4.22 ▼
New Democratic	Andrea Horwath	107	17	21	21	4 ▲	1,144,822	168,573 ▲	23.75	1.01 ▲
Green	Mike Schreiner	107	–	–	–	–	235,911	109,890 ▲	4.89	1.97 ▲
Libertarian	Allen Small	74					37,696	18,249 ▲	0.78	0.42 ▲
Freedom	Paul McKeever	42					11,835	2,677 ▼	0.25	0.06 ▼
Family Coalition	Eric Ames (interim)	6					4,287	-5,237 ▼	0.09	0.13 ▼
None of the Above	Greg Vezina	8					4,092	–	0.08	–
Independent		14					3,816	-4,483 ▼	0.08	0.10 ▼
Communist	Elizabeth Rowley	11					2,081	919 ▲	0.04	0.02 ▲
Canadians' Choice	Bahman Yazdanfar	4					1287	1,131▲	0.03	0.03 ▲
Vegan Environmental	Paul Figueiras	5					871	500 ▲	0.02	0.01 ▲
People's Political	Kevin Clarke	5					866	–	0.02	0.01 ▲
Northern Ontario Heritage	Edward Deibel	3					834	195 ▲	0.02	0.00 ▲
Special Needs	Danish Ahmed	3					714	47 ▲	0.01	0.00 ▼
Confederation of the Regions	vacant	2					549	-10 ▼	0.01	0.00 ▼
Trillium	Bob Yaciuk	2					368	–	0.01	–
Equal Parenting	Dennis Valenta	2					362	–	0.01	–
Socialist	Michael Laxer	2					296	-151 ▼	0.01	0.00 ▼
Moderate	Yuri Duboisky	2					268	–	0.01	–
Pauper	John Turmel	3					182	-344 ▼	0.00	0.01 ▼
	Total Valid						4,820,547	504,165 ▲		
	Rejected/Unmarked						35,009	16,909 ▲	(Note: % of total voter turnout)0.72	0.30 ▲
	Declined						29,937	27,602 ▲	0.61	0.05 ▲
References:	Turnout						4,885,493	548,676 ▲	51.29	3.11 ▲
Elections Ontario	Registered Voters						9,526,031	525,656 ▲		5.84 ▲

Polling results released by various polling firms projected a competitive election for much of the campaign period. However, as the campaign entered its final week, most reports gave the Liberal a small lead, and the final polling results released by all polling firms with established media presence put the Liberals a few points ahead of the Progressive Conservative for voting intention. Therefore, few were greatly surprised by the overall elections results reported on election night. With all polls having reported, the preliminary election night results shows Liberal Party having won 59 seats, giving them a ten-seats majority over the Conservative Party and the NDP respectively with 27 seats and 21 seats.

Two locales of recent by-election losses gave the Liberals particular reasons to celebrate. In the rematch in Etobicoke—Lakeshore, Peter Milczyn overturned 4-point byelection defeat less than a year earlier to a comfortable 13-point victory, ousting his former city council colleague Doug Holyday. The re-match in Thornhill remained too close to call throughout the evening. The last riding outstanding for the entire province on election night, it was declared for Liberal Sandra Yeung-Rocco, who suffered a 6-points, 1800-vote by-election defeat just four months, with an 85-vote margin.

The celebration was however short-lived, with a transposition error being discovered during the poll report tabulation Elections Ontario discovering a major transcription error the following days, which gave a 85-vote victory back to PC's Gila Martow. Given the dramatic reverse of fortune, the Ontario Court of Justice granted a recount for Thornhill despite the margin being well outside of the normal range for recount to be granted. The recount confirmed Martow's victory, and she was seated on July 8, 2014, a week later than other MPPs.

=== Seats changed hands, incumbent defeated ===
When compared to the previous general election in 2011, the 2014 election saw control for 17 seats shifting from one party to another. The Liberals and the NDP scored gains against each others, while both also claimed seats from the Progressive Conservatives. The PC was the singular loser in this general election, having lost seven seats to the Liberals, and two the NDP when compared to 2011, and was unable to retain the one seat they gained in the byelection. Interestingly, of the eleven seats the PC Party gained in 2011, nine remained in the PC column in 2014, losing only Barrie and Northumberland. Northumberland was notable as it was recaptured by former member Lou Rinaldi, a conscientious constituency worker who maintained heavy presence in the community despite the defeated. Other than those two seats, the other six seats lost were all seats firmly held since at least the start of the Harris ministry. In the case of Burlington, the seat was in the Conservative column since the end of WWII.

Four of the 17 seat transfers, three from the Liberals (London West, Niagara Falls, Windsor—Tecumseh) and one from Progressive Conservative (Kitchener—Waterloo ) all gains secured by the NDP, were already actualized earlier through by-elections, and the NDP were able to retain them and further build their margins of victory. As noted in the last section, Peter Milczyn recaptured Etobicoke—Lakeshore, the one seat the Liberals lost to the Progressive Conservative in 2013. According, only fourteen seats actually change hands at the general election.

In the general election, the NDP captured two seats from the Liberals and one from the Progressive Conservatives. Following their 40-point by-election wins in Windsor Tecumseh in 2013, NDP Lisa Gretzky met a resilient campaign by Liberal children and youth services minister Teresa Piruzza, captured the seat with less than three points and causing the only casualty for the Wynne ministry. With little fanfare, the NDP also captured Oshawa, a constituency with symbolic significance given the heavy presence of unionized autoworkers. Having endured repeated prediction of political demise and survived intense challenges by various prominent labour leaders with national profile, Progressive Conservative Jerry Ouellette, a one time cabinet minister, finally succumbed to electoral defeat in the hands of school teacher Jennifer French. The third victory came from Sudbury, an open seat following the retirement of long time Liberal minister Rick Bartolucci.

The NDP however lost three downtown Toronto seats to the Liberal Party, two of them held since their time in government in the early 1990s. The bigger than expected defeat of Rosario Marchese, a one-time minister in the Rae ministry, foreshadowed the massive Liberal victory in a federal byelection held in the same district a few weeks later. In Beaches-East York the popular former East York mayor Michael Prue put up a much more vigorous fight, losing the long held NDP riding by a 1-point margin.

Seat changed hands from 2011
Electoral district	Incumbent	Held since		Swing	Winner	*
Barrie	Rod Jackson	2011	2011	5.22%	Ann Hoggarth	
Beaches—East York	Michael Prue	1975	2001	5.93%	Arthur Potts	
Burlington	Jane McKenna	2011	1943	5.38%	Eleanor McMahon	
Cambridge	Rob Leone	2011	1995	5.49%	Kathryn McGarry	
Davenport	Jonah Schein	2011		4.99%	Cristina Martins	
Durham	open seat (retired: John O'Tool)	open	1995	10.94%	Granville Anderson	
Etobicoke—Lakeshore	Doug Holyday	2013		8.79%	Peter Milczyn	(Note: Recaptured of seat lost in 2013 by-election)
Halton	Ted Chudleigh	1995		6.51%	Indira Naidoo-Harris	
Kitchener—Waterloo	open seat (retired: Elizabeth Witmer)	open	1990	13.28%	Catherine Fife	(Note: Seat changed hand via by-election prior to 2014 general election)
London West	open seat (retired: Christopher Bentley)	open	2003	9.27%	Peggy Sattler	
Newmarket—Aurora	open seat (retired: Frank Klees)	open	1995	9.07%	Chris Ballard	
Niagara Falls	open seat (retired: Kim Craitor)	open	2003	11.56%	Wayne Gates	
Northumberland—Quinte West	Rob Milligan	2011		4.30%	Lou Rinaldi	(Note: previously defeated former member recaptured seat)
Oshawa	Jerry Ouellette	1995	1995	11.12%	Jennifer French	
Sudbury	open seat (retired: Rick Bartolucci)	open	1995	2.27%	Joe Cimino	
Trinity—Spadina	Rosario Marchese	1990		9.10%	Han Dong	
Windsor—Tecumseh	open seat (retired: Dwight Duncan)	open	1995	24.33%	Percy Hatfield	
Windsor West	Teresa Piruzza	2011	1995	6.65%	Lisa Gretzky	

2014 Ontario general election - seats won/lost by party, 2011-2014
Party	Total seats at start of 40th Parliament	Gain from (loss to)					Total seats at start of 41st Parliament
Party	Total seats at start of 40th Parliament	Liberal		Progressive Conservative	New Democratic		Total seats at start of 41st Parliament
Liberal	53			7	3	(5)	58
Progressive Conservative	37		(7)			(2)	28
New Democratic	17	5	(3)	2			21
Total	107	5	(10)	9	3	(7)	107

2014 Ontario general election - camposition of 41st Parliament by types of election outcome
Party	Held (by same party as 2011)			Gained (changed hands since 2011)			Total seats at start of 41st Parliament
Party	Incumbent re-elected	New member retained	Reversed by-elxn loss	Ousted incumbent	Captured open seat	Byelxn gain retained	Total seats at start of 41st Parliament
Liberal	42	5	1	8	2		58
Progressive Conservative	28						28
New Democratic	14			2	1	4	21
Total	84	5	1	10	3	4	107

Pairing off the top three parties, swings were calculated to be:

- PC to Liberal: 2.6%
- PC to NDP: 2.6%
- Liberal to NDP: insignificant

=== Marginal seats ===
The following seats had a margin of victory of less than 5 percentage points in the election:

Marginal constituencies (Ontario general election, 2014)
Constituency	Rank of parties			Margins		Result
Constituency	1st	2nd	3rd	1st vs 2nd	1st vs 3rd	Result
Barrie	40.7%	36.1%	16.3%	4.6%	24.4%	Lib gain
Beaches—East York	40.1%	39.0%	13.9%	1.1%	26.2%	Lib gain
Durham	36.5%	34.3%	24.1%	2.2%	12.4%	Lib gain
Kitchener—Conestoga	36.4%	33.3%	21.2%	3.1%	15.2%	PC hold
Parkdale—High Park	40.8%	40.0%	12.8%	0.8%	28.0%	NDP hold
Sudbury	42.2%	39.4%	13.8%	2.8%	28.4%	NDP gain
Thornhill	44.0%	43.8%	8.1%	0.2%	35.9%	PC hold
Windsor West	41.4%	38.5%	14.4%	2.9%	27.0%	NDP gain

=== Vote efficiency analysis ===
Party	Votes		Seats		votes per seat (variance)		Avg votes received		
Party	Votes		Seats		votes per seat (variance)		all	elected	defeated
Liberal	1,863,974	38.67%	58	54.21%	32,137.9	-28.6%	17,420.3	21873.6	12149.1
Progressive Conservative	1,505,436	31.23%	28	26.17%	53,765.6	+19.3%	14,069.5	20958.0	11628.0
New Democratic	1,144,822	23.75%	21	19.63%	54,515.3	+21.0%	10,699.3	19283.8	8603.0
Green	235,911	4.89%	0	0%	∞		2204.8	n/a	2204.8
Others	70,404	0.78%	0	0%	∞		376.5	n/a	376.5
Total	4,820,547		107		45,051.84	-	7,838.3	21,125.7	5,039.6

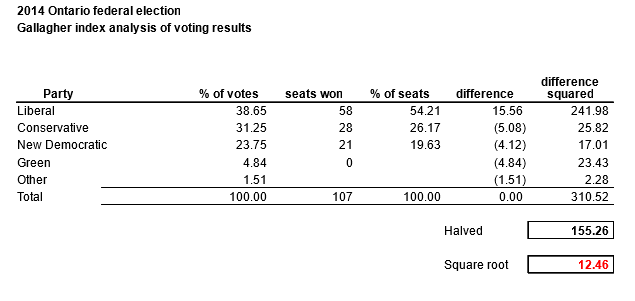
Gallagher index for the results of the Ontario general election, 2014. There is significant distortion noted in the Liberal results.

Vote and seat shares comparison
Lib - vote share	38.67%
Lib - seat share	54.21%
PC - vote share	31.23%
PC - seat share	26.17%
NDP - vote share	23.75%
NDP - seat share	19.63%
Green - vote share	4.89%
Green - seat share	0.00%
Others - vote share	1.46%
Others - vote share	0.00%

=== Summary analysis ===
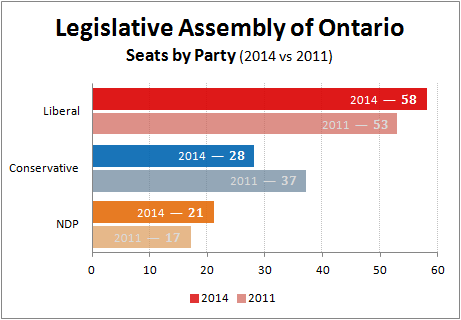
Number of seats held by party in the Legislative Assembly of Ontario (2014).

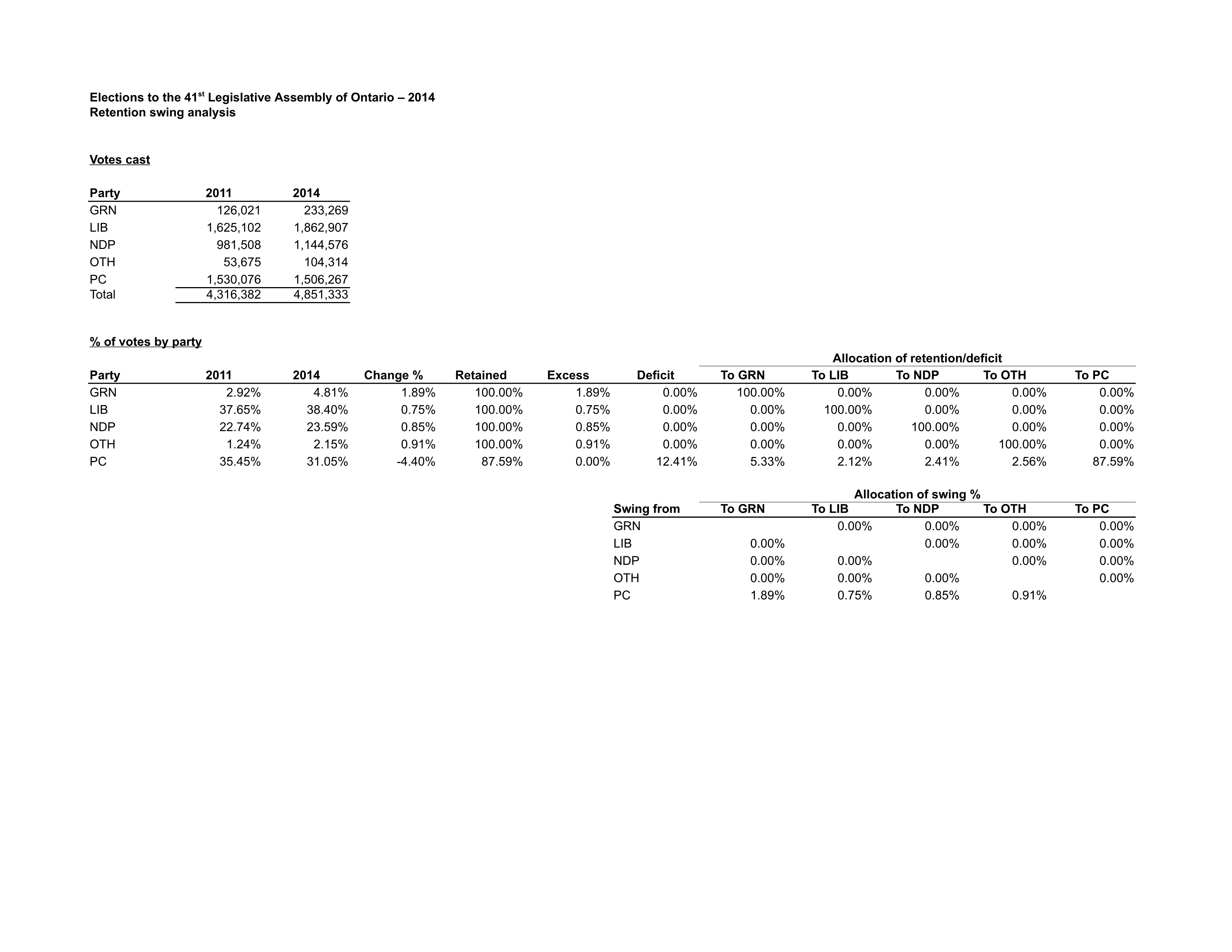
Retention swing analysis between parties for the 2014 Ontario general election, compared to the results from the previous 2011 election.

Popular vote
party	year	votes	change
Liberal	2011	37.65%	+1.02pp
Liberal	2014	38.67%	+1.02pp
Conservative	2011	35.45%	-4.22pp
Conservative	2014	31.23%	-4.22pp
NDP	2011	22.74%	+1.01pp
NDP	2014	23.75%	+1.01pp
Green	2011	2.92%	+1.97pp
Green	2014	4.89%	+1.97pp
Libertarian	2011	0.45%	+0.33pp
Libertarian	2014	0.78%	+0.33pp
Others	2011	0.79%	-0.11pp
Others	2014	0.68%	-0.11pp

=== Principal races ===
Party candidates in 2nd place
Party in 1st place	Party in 2nd place			Total
Party in 1st place	Lib	PC	NDP	Total
Liberal	–	43	15	58
Progressive Conservative	22	–	6	28
New Democratic	14	7	–	21
Total	36	50	21	107

Principal races, according to 1st and 2nd-place results
Parties		Seats
█ Liberal	█ Progressive Conservative	65
█ Liberal	█ New Democratic	29
█ Progressive Conservative	█ New Democratic	13
Total		107

Ternary plots - shift of electoral support (2011-2014)
2011

2014
Electoral districts identified by colours of winning parties

== Results by region ==
Ontario does not have official regional divisions that are universally accepted or broadly applied. Different regional definition are used informally by different organizations, media outlets and even different ministries within the Government of Ontario. Such definitions also evolve over time to reflect shift of population and economic growth. For the analysis in this section, the province is divided into five region – North, East, GTA, Toronto and Southwest, each roughly corresponding to a postal region. Specific regional and sub-regional assignments of electoral districts are done informally for ease of analysis, and are listed in the tables in the #Results by electoral district section.

The province-wide results had the Liberals gaining 5 seats and the NDP gaining four both from the PC. The regional results gave a more nuance picture that highlight some longer term trends. The Liberals make significant gains in GTA, but lost significant grounds in Southwest and in the North.

2014 Ontario general election - seat count by region
Region	Southwest		GTA		Toronto		East		North		Total	
# of Seats (% of Legislature)	23 (21.5%)		34 (31.7%)		22 (20.6%)		17 (15.9%)		11 (10.3%)		107	
Liberal	5	2 ▼	21	4 ▲	20	3 ▲	9	1 ▲	3	1 ▼	58	5 ▲
PC	12	2 ▼	6	6 ▼			8	1 ▼	2	Steady	28	9 ▼
NDP	6	4 ▲	7	2 ▲	2	3 ▼			6	1 ▲	21	4 ▲

Shares of total vote tally, by region
Region	Southwest		GTA		Toronto		East		North		Total	
# of Seats (% of Legislature)	23 (21.5%)		34 (31.7%)		22 (20.6%)		17 (15.9%)		11 (10.3%)		107	
	Share of votes from all electoral districts, by region (Note: calculated based on raw sum, not weighted by electoral districts)											
Liberal	28.42	4.53 ▼	40.05	2.52 ▲	49.08	1.76 ▲	39.19	2.63 ▲	33.89	3.49 ▲	38.67	1.02 ▲
PC	33.83	6.28 ▼	32.53	5.06 ▼	23.04	0.81 ▲	37.98	4.18 ▼	20.87	7.35 ▼	31.23	4.22 ▼
NDP	29.37	7.03 ▲	21.74	1.14 ▲	22.42	3.51 ▼	16.66	0.64 ▼	38.83	0.92 ▲	23.75	1.01 ▲
Green	6.67	3.32 ▲	4.14	1.30 ▲	3.89	1.53 ▲	5.24	2.12 ▲	5.10	2.19 ▲	4.89	1.97 ▲
	Sum of tallies from all electoral districts, by region											
Liberal	294,243		687,532		439,900		333,430		108,869		1,863,974	
PC	350,206		558,518		206,504		323,151		67,057		1,505,436	
NDP	304,038		373,324		200,996		141,722		124,742		1,144,822	
Green	69,037		71,005		34,879		44,604		16,386		235,911	
Total Valid	1,035,315		1,716,862		896,360		850,771		321,239		4,820,547	

2014 Ontario general election - seat count by sub-region
Party	Southwest - 23						GTA - 34						Toronto - 22				East - 17				North		Total	
Party	Southwest; 10		Midwest; 6		W-W; 7		Ham & N 8		P&H; 11		DYS; 15		City; 9		Metro; 13		East; 10		Ottawa; 7		North; 11		Total	
Lib	1	3 ▼	1	Steady	3	1 ▲	2	1 ▼	10	2 ▲	9	3 ▲	7	3 ▲	13	Steady	4	1 ▲	5	Steady	3	1 ▼	58	5 ▲
PC	4	Steady	5	Steady	3	2 ▼	1	Steady		2 ▼	5	4 ▼					6	1 ▼	2	Steady	2	Steady	28	9 ▼
NDP	5	3 ▲			1	1 ▲	5	1 ▲	1	Steady	1	1 ▲	2	3 ▼							6	1 ▲	21	4 ▲

Shares of total vote tally, by sub-region (Southwestern, Eastern, Northern Ontario)
Party	Southwest - 23						East - 17				North	
Party	Southwest; 10		Midwest; 6		W-W; 7		East; 10		Ottawa; 7		North; 11	
Lib	22.92	10.90 ▼	28.66	1.03 ▼	35.20	0.72 ▲	34.94	2.20 ▲	44.63	3.13 ▲	33.89	3.49 ▲
PC	29.91	5.26 ▼	41.84%	4.67 ▼	32.51	8.99 ▼	40.54	4.80 ▼	34.72	3.33 ▼	20.87	7.35 ▼
NDP	40.04	12.49 ▲	22.45	3.78 ▲	21.26	2.96 ▲	18.98	0.78 ▲	13.69	2.45 ▼	38.83	0.92 ▲
Green	5.33	2.91 ▲	5.07	2.04 ▲	9.62	4.76 ▲	4.62	1.66 ▲	6.03	2.70 ▲	5.10	2.19 ▲
	Sum of tallies from all electoral districts, by sub-region											
Liberal	98,534		76,281		119,428		166,831		166,599		108,869	
PC	128,580		111,334		110,292		193,577		129,574		67,057	
NDP	172,163		59,745		72,130		90,629		51,093		124,742	
Green	22,902		13,503		32,632		22,084		22,520		16,386	
Total Valid	429,942		266,120		339,253		477,523		373,248		321,239	

Shares of total vote tally, by sub-region (City of Toronto and Greater Toronto Area)
Party	GTA - 34						Toronto - 22			
Party	Ham & N 8		P&H; 11		DYS; 15		City; 9		Metro; 13	
Lib	29.10	1.72 ▼	45.96	2.52 ▲	41.21	4.29 ▲	48.09	3.55 ▲	49.87	0.38 ▲
PC	28.01	2.92 ▼	29.77	5.37 ▼	36.65	6.17 ▼	16.52	1.20 ▲	28.30	0.58 ▲
NDP	36.60	2.45 ▲	18.72	1.45 ▲	16.67	0.83 ▲	28.63	7.25 ▼	17.42	0.71 ▼
Green	4.70	2.31 ▲	3.41	0.85 ▲	4.37	1.10 ▲	4.98	2.04 ▲	3.02	1.10 ▲
	Sum of tallies from all electoral districts, by sub-region									
Liberal	110,735		252,638		324,159		192,413		247,487	
PC	106,621		163,605		288,292		66,074		140,430	
NDP	139,306		102,889		131,129		114,532		86,464	
Green	17,889		18,757		34,359		19,912		14,967	
Total Valid	380,593		549,640		786,629		400,076		496,284	

=== Strength Maps ===
Support for Liberal Party candidates by riding

Support for Conservative Party candidates by riding

Support for New Democratic Party candidates by riding

Support for Green Party candidates by riding

== Electoral district results & analysis ==
=== Elected members, winning tallies, and margin of victory, by electoral district ===
Gained seat by defeating incumbent
Gained seat following incumbent's retirement
Held seat with new candidate
Reversed by-election loss
Former MPP re-gained seats lost previously
-B Gained/held seat previously via by-election
-O Gained/held open seat at the 2014 general election

2014 Ontario general election - winning statistics, by electoral district
Electoral district	2011	Elected		Vote tally / share			Margin		Member	Region
		Party		#	%	%	#	%	elected	
Ajax—Pickering	Lib	Lib	Hold	26,257	51.06	3.73	11,258	21.89	Joe Dickson	GTA (DYS)
Algoma—Manitoulin	NDP	NDP	Hold	14,171	53.41	8.89	7,667	28.90	Michael Mantha	North
Ancaster—Dundas—Flambor.—Westdale	Lib	Lib	Hold	24,042	44.56	0.86	5,790	10.73	Ted McMeekin	GTA (H&N)
Barrie	PC	Lib	Gain	19,916	40.69	5.88	2,249	4.60	Ann Hoggarth	GTA (DYS)
Beaches—East York	NDP	Lib	Gain	17,218	40.09	4.01	481	1.12	Arthur Potts	Toronto (C)
Bramalea—Gore—Malton	NDP	NDP	Hold	23,519	44.32	6.16	5,646	10.64	Jagmeet Singh	GTA (P&H)
Brampton—Springdale	Lib	Lib	Hold-O	16,927	40.06	-4.36	3,414	8.08	Harinder Malhi	GTA (P&H)
Brampton West	Lib	Lib	Hold	24,832	45.23	1.47	11,469	20.89	Vic Dhillon	GTA (P&H)
Brant	Lib	Lib	Hold	19,396	37.63	0.55	3,949	7.66	Dave Levac	SW (Mid)
Bruce—Grey—Owen Sound	PC	PC	Hold	20,359	47.55	0.18	8,773	20.49	Bill Walker	SW (Mid)
Burlington	PC	Lib	Gain	23,573	43.41	7.33	3,487	6.42	Eleanor McMahon	GTA (P&H)
Cambridge	PC	Lib	Gain	18,763	38.93	5.85	3,069	6.37	Kathryn McGarry	SW (W)
Carleton—Mississippi Mills	PC	PC	Hold	30,590	47.49	-2.80	10,118	15.71	Jack MacLaren	East (O)
Chatham-Kent—Essex	PC	PC	Hold	14,183	37.83	-3.95	2,519	6.72	Rick Nicholls	Southwest
Davenport	NDP	Lib	Gain	16,272	45.61	4.20	1,950	5.47	Cristina Martins	Toronto (C)
Don Valley East	Lib	Lib	Hold	19,248	55.71	4.64	9,991	28.92	Michael Coteau	Toronto (M)
Don Valley West	Lib	Lib	Hold	26,215	57.01	-1.30	12,133	26.39	Kathleen Wynne	Toronto (M)
Dufferin—Caledon	PC	PC	Hold	18,017	39.86	-7.09	4,156	9.19	Sylvia Jones	SW (W)
Durham	PC	Lib	Gain-O	19,816	36.45	7.10	1,176	2.16	Granville Anderson	GTA (DYS)
Eglinton—Lawrence	Lib	Lib	Hold	22,855	54.80	0.65	8,776	21.04	Mike Colle	Toronto (C)
Elgin—Middlesex—London	PC	PC	Hold	20,946	46.36	-1.50	8,912	19.72	Jeff Yurek	Southwest
Essex	NDP	NDP	Hold	28,118	60.34	22.35	17,949	38.52	Taras Natyshak	Southwest
Etobicoke Centre	Lib	Lib	Hold-O	23,848	50.28	-1.21	8,328	17.56	Yvan Baker	Toronto (M)
Etobicoke—Lakeshore	Lib	Lib	Hold-R	24,311	47.49	-3.54	6,724	13.13	Peter Milczyn	Toronto (M)
Etobicoke North	Lib	Lib	Hold	12,168	44.90	-3.55	5,065	18.69	Shafiq Qaadri	Toronto (M)
Glengarry—Prescott—Russell	Lib	Lib	Hold	23,565	49.74	6.56	8,136	17.17	Grant Crack	East
Guelph	Lib	Lib	Hold	22,014	41.52	-0.92	10,966	20.68	Liz Sandals	SW (W)
Haldimand—Norfolk	PC	PC	Hold	22,066	52.22	-8.58	12,280	29.06	Toby Barrett	SW (Mid)
Haliburton—Kawartha Lakes—Brock	PC	PC	Hold	21,641	40.96	-4.48	3,129	5.92	Laurie Scott	East
Halton	PC	Lib	Gain	33,724	44.79	5.66	5,787	7.69	Indira Naidoo-Harris	GTA (P&H)
Hamilton Centre	NDP	NDP	Hold	18,697	52.01	-9.32	10,247	28.50	Andrea Horwath	GTA (H&N)
Hamilton East—Stoney Creek	NDP	NDP	Hold	19,958	46.81	-4.91	7,525	17.65	Paul Miller	GTA (H&N)
Hamilton Mountain	NDP	NDP	Hold	23,006	46.90	1.73	8,498	17.32	Monique Taylor	GTA (H&N)
Huron—Bruce	PC	PC	Hold	18,512	39.01	-3.75	3,865	8.14	Lisa Thompson	SW (Mid)
Kenora—Rainy River	NDP	NDP	Hold	12,889	55.66	6.04	6,984	30.16	Sarah Campbell	North
Kingston and the Islands	Lib	Lib	Hold-O	20,838	41.59	-7.26	6,027	12.03	Sophie Kiwala	East
Kitchener Centre	Lib	Lib	Hold-O	18,472	43.14	3.92	6,922	16.17	Daiene Vernile	SW (W)
Kitchener—Conestoga	PC	PC	Hold	17,083	36.36	-7.82	1,419	3.02	Michael Harris	SW (W)
Kitchener—Waterloo	PC	NDP	Gain-B	20,536	37.43	20.77	4,002	7.29	Catherine Fife	SW (W)
Lambton—Kent—Middlesex	PC	PC	Hold	20,710	45.17	-0.56	8,550	18.65	Monte McNaughton	Southwest
Lanark—Frontenac—Lennox & Addington	PC	PC	Hold	21,966	43.52	-6.60	6,929	13.73	Randy Hillier	East
Leeds—Grenville	PC	PC	Hold	23,253	56.07	-7.53	14,754	35.58	Steve Clark	East
London—Fanshawe	NDP	NDP	Hold	17,903	50.42	9.65	9,707	27.34	Teresa Armstrong	Southwest
London North Centre	Lib	Lib	Hold	16,379	35.98	-7.92	2,526	5.55	Deb Matthews	Southwest
London West	Lib	NDP	Gain-B	22,243	40.36	18.64	5,948	10.79	Peggy Sattler	Southwest
Markham—Unionville	Lib	Lib	Hold	21,517	51.33	-1.25	7,276	17.36	Michael Chan	GTA (DYS)
Mississauga—Brampton South	Lib	Lib	Hold	19,923	48.21	2.18	8,672	20.99	Amrit Mangat	GTA (P&H)
Mississauga East—Cooksville	Lib	Lib	Hold	20,934	52.33	6.59	10,455	26.14	Dipika Damerla	GTA (P&H)
Mississauga—Erindale	Lib	Lib	Hold	25,356	48.98	3.96	9,882	19.09	Harinder Takhar	GTA (P&H)
Mississauga South	Lib	Lib	Hold	22,192	50.76	0.05	7,678	17.56	Charles Sousa	GTA (P&H)
Mississauga—Streetsville	Lib	Lib	Hold	22,587	52.57	1.03	10,527	24.50	Bob Delaney	GTA (P&H)
Nepean—Carleton	PC	PC	Hold	30,901	46.77	-7.71	8,927	13.51	Lisa MacLeod	East (O)
Newmarket—Aurora	PC	Lib	Gain-O	22,997	43.94	8.32	3,412	6.52	Chris Ballard	GTA (DYS)
Niagara Falls	Lib	NDP	Gain-B	24,131	47.39	21.09	7,429	14.59	Wayne Gates	GTA (H&N)
Niagara West—Glanbrook	PC	PC	Hold	23,378	41.82	-9.13	7,535	13.48	Tim Hudak	GTA (H&N)
Nickel Belt	NDP	NDP	Hold	20,104	62.62	7.76	13,073	40.72	France Gélinas	North
Nipissing	PC	PC	Hold	13,085	41.81	-8.30	4,703	15.03	Vic Fedeli	North
Northumberland—Quinte West	PC	Lib	Gain	23,419	42.97	4.63	3,836	7.04	Lou Rinaldi	East
Oak Ridges—Markham	Lib	Lib	Hold	36,782	45.55	0.77	6,526	8.08	Helena Jaczek	GTA (DYS)
Oakville	Lib	Lib	Hold	24,717	49.40	1.31	5,796	11.58	Kevin Flynn	GTA (P&H)
Oshawa	PC	NDP	Gain	22,232	46.70	10.52	7,692	16.16	Jennifer French	GTA (DYS)
Ottawa Centre	Lib	Lib	Hold	27,689	52.02	5.20	16,795	31.55	Yasir Naqvi	East (O)
Ottawa—Orléans	Lib	Lib	Hold-O	29,911	53.50	7.06	11,386	20.37	Marie-France Lalonde	East (O)
Ottawa South	Lib	Lib	Hold-B	23,708	49.96	1.11	8,473	17.86	John Fraser	East (O)
Ottawa—Vanier	Lib	Lib	Hold	21,810	55.55	4.04	13,060	33.26	Madeleine Meilleur	East (O)
Ottawa West—Nepean	Lib	Lib	Hold	21,035	44.84	3.23	5,140	10.96	Bob Chiarelli	East (O)
Oxford	PC	PC	Hold	18,958	46.24	-8.63	8,385	20.45	Ernie Hardeman	SW (Mid)
Parkdale—High Park	NDP	NDP	Hold	18,385	40.77	-5.43	544	1.21	Cheri DiNovo	Toronto (C)
Parry Sound—Muskoka	PC	PC	Hold	15,761	40.73	-13.36	5,603	14.48	Norm Miller	North
Perth—Wellington	PC	PC	Hold	15,992	38.96	-1.14	2,407	5.86	Randy Pettapiece	SW (Mid)
Peterborough	Lib	Lib	Hold	24,709	46.33	6.40	8,802	16.50	Jeff Leal	East
Pickering—Scarborough East	Lib	Lib	Hold	23,206	51.96	5.30	10,568	23.66	Tracy MacCharles	GTA (DYS)
Prince Edward—Hastings	PC	PC	Hold	19,281	41.72	-0.56	4,176	9.04	Todd Smith	East
Renfrew—Nipissing—Pembroke	PC	PC	Hold	25,241	61.07	-9.72	17,344	41.96	John Yakabuski	East
Richmond Hill	Lib	Lib	Hold	20,455	47.78	0.86	4,813	11.24	Reza Moridi	GTA (DYS)
St. Catharines	Lib	Lib	Hold	19,070	41.00	0.79	5,256	11.30	Jim Bradley	GTA (H&N)
St. Paul's	Lib	Lib	Hold	30,027	59.74	1.35	17,990	35.79	Eric Hoskins	Toronto (C)
Sarnia—Lambton	PC	PC	Hold	18,722	41.01	-7.31	2,395	5.25	Bob Bailey	Southwest
Sault Ste. Marie	Lib	Lib	Hold	17,490	58.53	3.57	9,880	33.06	David Orazietti	North
Scarborough—Agincourt	Lib	Lib	Hold	17,332	49.84	2.99	5,291	15.22	Soo Wong	Toronto (M)
Scarborough Centre	Lib	Lib	Hold	19,390	55.05	3.63	11,791	33.48	Brad Duguid	Toronto (M)
Scarborough—Guildwood	Lib	Lib	Hold-B	17,318	49.89	0.96	7,597	21.89	Mitzie Hunter	Toronto (M)
Scarborough—Rouge River	Lib	Lib	Hold	16,095	38.71	-3.17	3,076	7.40	Bas Balkissoon	Toronto (M)
Scarborough Southwest	Lib	Lib	Hold	18,420	50.23	6.13	9,746	26.58	Lorenzo Berardinetti	Toronto (M)
Simcoe—Grey	PC	PC	Hold	25,988	47.12	-7.21	8,789	15.94	Jim Wilson	GTA (DYS)
Simcoe North	PC	PC	Hold	22,179	43.96	-11.20	5,766	11.43	Garfield Dunlop	GTA (DYS)
Stormont—Dundas—South Glengarry	PC	PC	Hold	20,624	51.72	-3.54	11,374	28.52	Jim McDonell	East
Sudbury	Lib	NDP	Gain-O	14,274	42.24	1.51	978	2.89	Joe Cimino	North
Thornhill	PC	PC	Hold	21,886	43.99	-2.72	106	0.21	Gila Martow	GTA (DYS)
Thunder Bay—Atikokan	Lib	Lib	Hold	15,176	52.98	14.01	7,124	24.87	Bill Mauro	North
Thunder Bay—Superior North	Lib	Lib	Hold	15,519	55.97	10.97	7,350	26.51	Michael Gravelle	North
Timiskaming—Cochrane	NDP	NDP	Hold	14,661	55.48	5.36	8,527	32.27	John Vanthof	North
Timmins—James Bay	NDP	NDP	Hold	11,756	51.18	1.71	6,229	27.12	Gilles Bisson	North
Toronto Centre	Lib	Lib	Hold	29,935	58.47	3.54	20,437	39.92	Glen Murray	Toronto (C)
Toronto—Danforth	NDP	NDP	Hold	19,190	44.61	-9.40	3,207	7.46	Peter Tabuns	Toronto (C)
Trinity—Spadina	NDP	Lib	Gain	26,613	46.34	6.40	9,171	15.97	Han Dong	Toronto (C)
Vaughan	Lib	Lib	Hold-B	33,877	56.21	3.19	16,898	28.04	Steven Del Duca	GTA (DYS)
Welland	NDP	NDP	Hold	21,326	46.71	2.05	8,393	18.38	Cindy Forster	GTA (H&N)
Wellington—Halton Hills	PC	PC	Hold	22,450	46.61	-9.01	8,330	17.29	Ted Arnott	SW (W)
Whitby—Oshawa	PC	PC	Hold	24,027	40.65	-7.52	5,410	9.15	Christine Elliott	GTA (DYS)
Willowdale	Lib	Lib	Hold	24,300	52.58	1.73	8,832	19.11	David Zimmer	Toronto (M)
Windsor—Tecumseh	Lib	NDP	Gain-B	22,818	62.16	29.31	17,219	46.91	Percy Hatfield	Southwest
Windsor West	Lib	NDP	Gain	15,043	41.41	10.57	1,042	2.87	Lisa Gretzky	Southwest
York Centre	Lib	Lib	Hold	16,935	47.89	2.53	5,810	16.43	Monte Kwinter	Toronto (M)
York—Simcoe	PC	PC	Hold	19,025	40.40	-12.38	2,749	5.84	Julia Munro	GTA (DYS)
York South—Weston	Lib	Lib	Hold	15,669	47.85	3.30	3,469	10.59	Laura Albanese	Toronto (C)
York West	Lib	Lib	Hold	11,907	46.71	-3.78	1,910	7.49	Mario Sergio	Toronto (M)

=== Major parties performance, by electoral district ===
2014 Ontario general election - performance of the major parties
Riding	2011	Elected		Turnout (Note: including spoilt ballots)		Votes (Note: minor parties are aggregated under "Other"; independent candidates are aggregated separately)							
Riding	2011	Party	Share	Turnout		Lib	PC	NDP	Green	Ind	Other	Total	
Riding			%	%	%								
Ajax—Pickering	Lib	Lib	51.06	50.18	5.34	26,257	14,999	8,274	1,589	–	301	51,420	GTA (DYS)
Algoma—Manitoulin	NDP	NDP	53.41	49.38	-0.05	6,504	4,589	14,171	828	–	441	26,533	North
Ancaster—Dundas—Flambor.—Westdale	Lib	Lib	44.56	59.02	2.57	24,042	18,252	8,415	2,639	–	611	53,959	GTA (H&N)
Barrie	PC	Lib	40.69	49.18	3.18	19,916	17,667	7,975	3,018	–	366	48,942	GTA (DYS)
Beaches—East York	NDP	Lib	40.09	56.14	4.50	17,218	5,982	16,737	2,329	–	682	42,948	Toronto (C)
Bramalea—Gore—Malton	NDP	NDP	44.32	45.03	4.32	17,873	9,403	23,519	2,277	–	–	53,072	GTA (P&H)
Brampton—Springdale	Lib	Lib	40.06	45.34	4.80	16,927	10,117	13,513	1,311	–	382	42,250	GTA (P&H)
Brampton West	Lib	Lib	45.23	42.50	4.21	24,832	13,363	12,985	1,504	–	2,418	54,902	GTA (P&H)
Brant	Lib	Lib	37.63	52.51	4.29	19,396	15,447	13,992	2,095	–	614	51,544	SW (Mid)
Bruce—Grey—Owen Sound	PC	PC	47.55	53.93	-0.77	11,586	20,359	6,787	3,696	–	388	42,816	SW (Mid)
Burlington	PC	Lib	43.41	57.73	2.90	23,573	20,086	7,792	2,250	–	608	54,309	GTA (P&H)
Cambridge	PC	Lib	38.93	48.95	2.91	18,763	15,694	10,413	2,726	–	605	48,201	SW (W)
Carleton—Mississippi Mills	PC	PC	47.49	56.08	2.59	20,472	30,590	8,744	4,614	–	–	64,420	East (O)
Chatham-Kent—Essex	PC	PC	37.83	51.33	1.92	9,158	14,183	11,664	1,971	–	514	37,490	Southwest
Davenport	NDP	Lib	45.61	49.56	3.97	16,272	2,665	14,322	1,784	–	631	35,674	Toronto (C)
Don Valley East	Lib	Lib	55.71	47.85	1.77	19,248	9,257	4,500	1,256	–	287	34,548	Toronto (M)
Don Valley West	Lib	Lib	57.01	53.90	2.96	26,215	14,082	3,569	1,286	138	690	45,980	Toronto (M)
Dufferin—Caledon	PC	PC	39.86	51.48	3.74	13,861	18,017	5,269	7,518	–	538	45,203	SW (W)
Durham	PC	Lib	36.45	55.71	5.97	19,816	18,640	13,094	2,382	–	434	54,366	GTA (DYS)
Eglinton—Lawrence	Lib	Lib	54.80	53.99	2.18	22,855	14,079	3,060	1,305	143	264	41,706	Toronto (C)
Elgin—Middlesex—London	PC	PC	46.36	53.98	2.70	9,183	20,946	12,034	2,236	–	784	45,183	Southwest
Essex	NDP	NDP	60.34	50.20	-1.18	6,628	10,169	28,118	1,685	–	–	46,600	Southwest
Etobicoke Centre	Lib	Lib	50.28	56.47	3.85	23,848	15,520	5,758	1,254	–	1,052	47,432	Toronto (M)
Etobicoke—Lakeshore	Lib	Lib	47.49	53.73	3.72	24,311	17,587	6,362	2,064	–	869	51,193	Toronto (M)
Etobicoke North	Lib	Lib	44.90	42.71	2.56	12,168	6,163	7,103	677	–	987	27,098	Toronto (M)
Glengarry—Prescott—Russell	Lib	Lib	49.74	53.36	5.55	23,565	15,429	5,902	1,528	296	655	47,375	East
Guelph	Lib	Lib	41.52	55.47	5.21	22,014	11,048	9,385	10,230	–	348	53,025	SW (W)
Haldimand—Norfolk	PC	PC	52.22	53.97	0.67	8,331	22,066	9,786	2,071	–	–	42,254	SW (Mid)
Haliburton—Kawartha Lakes—Brock	PC	PC	40.96	55.98	1.00	18,512	21,641	10,431	2,255	–	–	52,839	East
Halton	PC	Lib	44.79	50.90	4.91	33,724	27,937	9,758	2,618	–	1,262	75,299	GTA (P&H)
Hamilton Centre	NDP	NDP	52.01	44.76	2.32	8,450	5,173	18,697	3,067	–	563	35,950	GTA (H&N)
Hamilton East—Stoney Creek	NDP	NDP	46.81	48.84	2.58	12,433	7,574	19,958	1,742	–	930	42,637	GTA (H&N)
Hamilton Mountain	NDP	NDP	46.90	52.85	2.40	14,508	8,795	23,006	2,047	–	699	49,055	GTA (H&N)
Huron—Bruce	PC	PC	39.01	59.96	0.73	14,647	18,512	10,843	1,651	–	1,804	47,457	SW (Mid)
Kenora—Rainy River	NDP	NDP	55.66	46.72	0.97	3,652	5,905	12,889	711	–	–	23,157	North
Kingston and the Islands	Lib	Lib	41.59	52.14	7.11	20,838	10,652	14,811	3,566	–	242	50,109	East
Kitchener Centre	Lib	Lib	43.14	52.28	3.12	18,472	11,550	9,765	2,472	–	557	42,816	SW (W)
Kitchener—Conestoga	PC	PC	36.36	50.33	3.71	15,664	17,083	9,958	3,277	–	1,001	46,983	SW (W)
Kitchener—Waterloo	PC	NDP	37.43	54.95	4.41	16,534	14,450	20,536	2,859	–	481	54,860	SW (W)
Lambton—Kent—Middlesex	PC	PC	45.17	56.93	2.85	9,298	20,710	12,160	2,104	–	1,575	45,847	Southwest
Lanark—Frontenac—Lennox & Addington	PC	PC	43.52	53.95	3.52	15,037	21,966	10,184	3,283	–	–	50,470	East
Leeds—Grenville	PC	PC	56.07	52.86	2.22	8,499	23,253	7,219	2,030	–	471	41,472	East
London—Fanshawe	NDP	NDP	50.42	46.42	0.60	7,066	8,196	17,903	1,378	112	853	35,508	Southwest
London North Centre	Lib	Lib	35.98	50.21	2.34	16,379	12,016	13,853	2,445	–	824	45,517	Southwest
London West	Lib	NDP	40.36	56.03	3.03	13,070	16,295	22,243	2,310	–	1,188	55,106	Southwest
Markham—Unionville	Lib	Lib	51.33	44.54	3.86	21,517	14,241	4,205	1,509	–	444	41,916	GTA (DYS)
Mississauga—Brampton South	Lib	Lib	48.21	41.48	5.05	19,923	11,251	6,906	1,302	351	1,590	41,323	GTA (P&H)
Mississauga East—Cooksville	Lib	Lib	52.33	43.89	3.39	20,934	10,479	6,158	1,408	–	1,022	40,001	GTA (P&H)
Mississauga—Erindale	Lib	Lib	48.98	46.90	2.99	25,356	15,474	7,730	1,216	–	1,988	51,764	GTA (P&H)
Mississauga South	Lib	Lib	50.76	53.55	2.30	22,192	14,514	4,649	1,418	–	946	43,719	GTA (P&H)
Mississauga—Streetsville	Lib	Lib	52.57	46.76	5.30	22,587	12,060	5,885	1,566	–	866	42,964	GTA (P&H)
Nepean—Carleton	PC	PC	46.77	55.39	5.48	21,974	30,901	8,628	3,630	–	940	66,073	East (O)
Newmarket—Aurora	PC	Lib	43.94	53.40	4.07	22,997	19,585	6,023	2,144	–	1,584	52,333	GTA (DYS)
Niagara Falls	Lib	NDP	47.39	51.21	1.77	7,329	16,702	24,131	1,724	–	1,037	50,923	GTA (H&N)
Niagara West—Glanbrook	PC	PC	41.82	58.59	3.71	15,843	23,378	12,423	3,004	–	1,254	55,902	GTA (H&N)
Nickel Belt	NDP	NDP	62.62	50.00	0.44	7,031	3,827	20,104	1,145	–	–	32,107	North
Nipissing	PC	PC	41.81	52.49	0.63	8,382	13,085	8,057	1,188	208	377	31,297	North
Northumberland—Quinte West	PC	Lib	42.97	55.81	3.94	23,419	19,583	9,211	2,283	–	–	54,496	East
Oak Ridges—Markham	Lib	Lib	45.55	46.21	3.51	36,782	30,256	9,355	2,791	–	1,571	80,755	GTA (DYS)
Oakville	Lib	Lib	49.40	56.13	3.42	24,717	18,921	3,994	1,887	–	518	50,037	GTA (P&H)
Oshawa	PC	NDP	46.70	50.19	5.92	9,051	14,540	22,232	1,785	–	–	47,608	GTA (DYS)
Ottawa Centre	Lib	Lib	52.02	56.85	3.12	27,689	9,678	10,894	4,163	–	808	53,232	East (O)
Ottawa—Orléans	Lib	Lib	53.50	59.33	6.68	29,911	18,525	5,022	2,036	–	411	55,905	East (O)
Ottawa South	Lib	Lib	49.96	53.71	2.52	23,708	15,235	5,817	2,034	–	656	47,450	East (O)
Ottawa—Vanier	Lib	Lib	55.55	48.86	2.05	21,810	8,750	5,228	3,144	–	329	39,261	East (O)
Ottawa West—Nepean	Lib	Lib	44.84	55.95	1.93	21,035	15,895	6,760	2,899	–	318	46,907	East (O)
Oxford	PC	PC	46.24	51.92	2.74	8,736	18,958	10,573	1,985	–	749	41,001	SW (Mid)
Parkdale—High Park	NDP	NDP	40.77	56.88	5.10	17,841	5,787	18,385	2,479	–	601	45,093	Toronto (C)
Parry Sound—Muskoka	PC	PC	40.73	52.11	0.33	10,158	15,761	4,999	7,484	–	296	38,698	North
Perth—Wellington	PC	PC	38.96	55.66	3.77	13,585	15,992	7,764	2,005	343	1,359	41,048	SW (Mid)
Peterborough	Lib	Lib	46.33	57.30	4.11	24,709	15,907	9,728	2,287	395	305	53,331	East
Pickering—Scarborough East	Lib	Lib	51.96	54.77	5.08	23,206	12,638	6,600	1,564	–	654	44,662	GTA (DYS)
Prince Edward—Hastings	PC	PC	41.72	51.61	-0.14	15,105	19,281	8,829	2,448	–	555	46,218	East
Renfrew—Nipissing—Pembroke	PC	PC	61.07	54.32	1.63	7,897	25,241	5,978	1,337	392	489	41,334	East
Richmond Hill	Lib	Lib	47.78	45.69	3.20	20,455	15,642	4,697	1,344	–	670	42,808	GTA (DYS)
St. Catharines	Lib	Lib	41.00	54.80	3.80	19,070	13,814	11,350	1,792	–	488	46,514	GTA (H&N)
St. Paul's	Lib	Lib	59.74	57.11	6.70	30,027	12,037	5,056	2,569	–	572	50,261	Toronto (C)
Sarnia—Lambton	PC	PC	41.01	57.35	5.60	8,152	18,722	16,327	2,109	–	340	45,650	Southwest
Sault Ste. Marie	Lib	Lib	58.53	50.77	1.42	17,490	3,704	7,610	965	–	115	29,884	North
Scarborough—Agincourt	Lib	Lib	49.84	46.04	2.47	17,332	12,041	4,105	907	–	387	34,772	Toronto (M)
Scarborough Centre	Lib	Lib	55.05	48.09	3.60	19,390	7,599	7,145	1,086	–	–	35,220	Toronto (M)
Scarborough—Guildwood	Lib	Lib	49.89	49.24	1.59	17,318	9,721	5,894	1,034	–	744	34,711	Toronto (M)
Scarborough—Rouge River	Lib	Lib	38.71	47.48	4.58	16,095	11,500	13,019	571	–	398	41,583	Toronto (M)
Scarborough Southwest	Lib	Lib	50.23	49.91	2.13	18,420	7,573	8,674	1,493	185	328	36,673	Toronto (M)
Simcoe—Grey	PC	PC	47.12	52.00	3.88	17,199	25,988	7,793	4,172	–	–	55,152	GTA (DYS)
Simcoe North	PC	PC	43.96	53.33	2.35	16,413	22,179	7,846	4,013	–	–	50,451	GTA (DYS)
Stormont—Dundas—South Glengarry	PC	PC	51.72	52.02	0.63	9,250	20,624	8,336	1,067	–	602	39,879	East
Sudbury	Lib	NDP	42.24	51.92	1.97	13,296	4,663	14,274	1,212	105	243	33,793	North
Thornhill	PC	PC	43.99	47.83	2.48	21,780	21,886	4,052	1,229	–	804	49,751	GTA (DYS)
Thunder Bay—Atikokan	Lib	Lib	52.98	49.02	2.42	15,176	3,779	8,052	964	–	676	28,647	North
Thunder Bay—Superior North	Lib	Lib	55.97	50.41	2.21	15,519	1,991	8,169	997	–	1,049	27,725	North
Timiskaming—Cochrane	NDP	NDP	55.48	50.68	0.67	6,134	4,527	14,661	489	–	615	26,426	North
Timmins—James Bay	NDP	NDP	51.18	45.15	-1.68	5,527	5,226	11,756	403	–	60	22,972	North
Toronto Centre	Lib	Lib	58.47	50.86	2.44	29,935	9,498	8,140	2,265	–	1,357	51,195	Toronto (C)
Toronto—Danforth	NDP	NDP	44.61	55.30	6.00	15,983	4,304	19,190	2,351	–	1,189	43,017	Toronto (C)
Trinity—Spadina	NDP	Lib	46.34	49.33	6.33	26,613	8,035	17,442	4,033	–	1,311	57,434	Toronto (C)
Vaughan	Lib	Lib	56.21	44.68	3.60	33,877	16,979	6,942	1,350	–	1,121	60,269	GTA (DYS)
Welland	NDP	NDP	46.71	53.20	1.56	9,060	12,933	21,326	1,874	–	460	45,653	GTA (H&N)
Wellington—Halton Hills	PC	PC	46.61	55.61	4.50	14,120	22,450	6,804	3,550	–	1,241	48,165	SW (W)
Whitby—Oshawa	PC	PC	40.65	54.35	4.66	18,617	24,027	13,621	2,523	–	322	59,110	GTA (DYS)
Willowdale	Lib	Lib	52.58	46.88	1.48	24,300	15,468	4,693	1,758	–	–	46,219	Toronto (M)
Windsor—Tecumseh	Lib	NDP	62.16	42.77	-1.92	5,599	2,118	22,818	5,493	–	682	36,710	Southwest
Windsor West	Lib	NDP	41.41	42.71	1.13	14,001	5,225	15,043	1,171	891	–	36,331	Southwest
York Centre	Lib	Lib	47.89	46.74	1.00	16,935	11,125	5,645	1,163	–	493	35,361	Toronto (M)
York—Simcoe	PC	PC	40.40	47.53	4.62	16,276	19,025	8,420	2,946	–	419	47,086	GTA (DYS)
York South—Weston	Lib	Lib	47.85	46.13	1.27	15,669	3,687	12,200	797	146	249	32,748	Toronto (C)
York West	Lib	Lib	46.71	42.24	3.01	11,907	2,794	9,997	418	111	267	25,494	Toronto (M)

= open seat
= turnout is above provincial average
= incumbent re-elected
= incumbency arose from byelection gain

=== Contests ===
	Candidates in contest								Total	Average of votes received by candidate	
# of candidates	4	5	6	7	8	9	10	11	Total	Average of votes received by candidate	
Districts with said # of candidates	14	37	33	14	6	1	1	1	107	Average of votes received by candidate	
Parties participation in such contests										all	successful
Liberal	14	37	33	14	6	1	1	1	107	17,420.3	21,873.6
Progressive Conservative	14	37	33	14	6	1	1	1	107	14,069.5	20,958.0
New Democratic	14	37	33	14	6	1	1	1	107	10,699.3	19,283.8
Green	14	37	33	14	6	1	1	1	107	2,204.8	
Libertarian		24	28	13	5	1	1	1	73	516.4	
Freedom		7	18	8	6	1	1	1	42	281.8	
Communist		1	3	3	1	1	1	1	11	189.2	
None of the Above		1	3	3	1				8	511.5	
Family Coalition			1	2	3				6	714.5	
Independents		1	7	3	2	1			14	272.6	
Other (Note: Other minor political parties are aggregated together)		3	6	10	6	1	3	4	33	199.9	
Total candidates in such contests	56	185	198	98	48	9	10	11	615	7,838.3	21,125.7

Candidates ranked 1st to 5th place, by party
Parties	1st	2nd	3rd	4th	5th	Total
█ Liberal	58	36	13			107
█ Progressive Conservative	28	50	28	1		107
█ New Democratic	21	21	62	3		107
█ Green			4	101	2	107
█ Libertarian				1	61	62
█ Northern Ontario Heritage				1		1
█ Freedom					15	15
█ None of the Above					4	4
█ Family Coalition					3	3
█ Independent					2	2
█ Communist					2	2
█ Confederation of Regions					2	2
█ Canadians' Choice					1	1
█ Trillium					1	1

=== Significant results among independent and minor party candidates ===
Those candidates not belonging to a major party, receiving more than 1,000 votes in the election, are listed below:

Riding	Party	Candidates	Votes	Placed
Huron—Bruce	█ FamilyCoalition	Andrew Zettel	1,353	5th
Kitchener—Conestoga	█ Libertarian	David Schumm	1,001	5th
London West	█ Freedom	Al Gretzky	1,188	5th
Oak Ridges—Markham	█ Libertarian	Karl Boelling	1,358	5th
Vaughan	█ Libertarian	Paolo Fabrizio	1,121	5th
Wellington—Halton Hills	█ Libertarian	Jason Cousineau	1,043	5th

== Opinion polls ==
Voting intention polls released throughout the election campaign were distinctly inconsistent and contradictory, as shown in the graph and table below. During much of the campaign, different pollsters persistently disagreed, frequently by important margins, on whether the Liberals or Progressive Conservatives held the lead, though by the final days most polls showed the Liberals marginally to comfortably ahead. Still, polls completed on the last day of the campaign by Ipsos Reid and EKOS showed vastly divergent support for the NDP, at 30% and 19%, respectively. Also of note, although four different pollsters released results among "likely voters" alongside their results among all eligible voters in an effort to better predict the outcome of the election based on expected voter turnout, in all cases the former proved to be overall poorer predictors than the latter.

=== General opinion polls ===
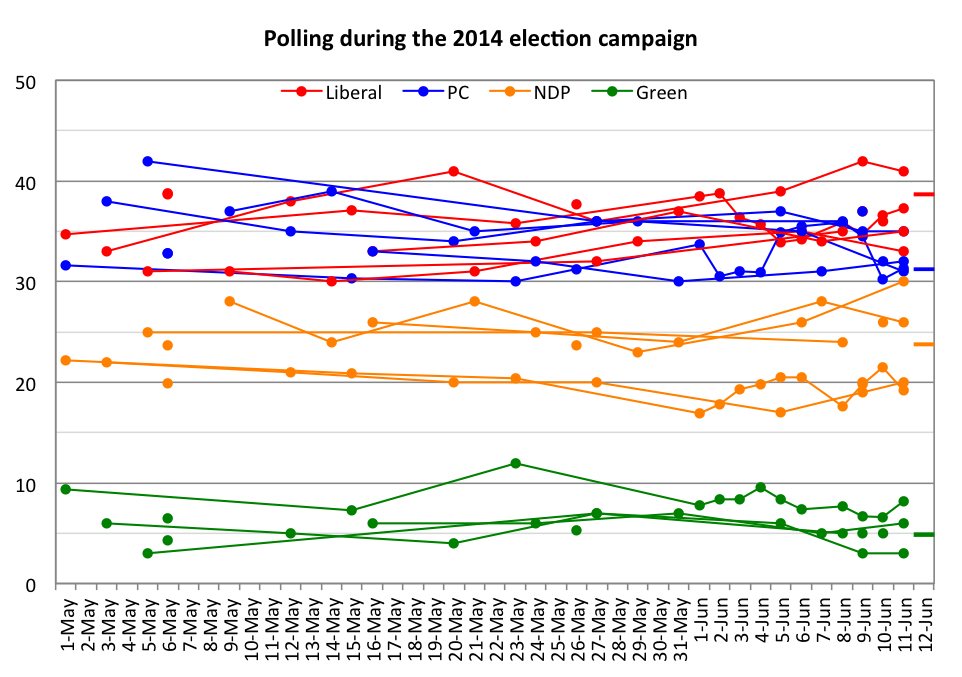
Evolution of voting intentions during the 2014 Ontario general election campaign. Dots represent results of individual polls. Lines connect successive polls by the same polling firm. Dashes on June 12 represent election results.

Polling firm	Last date of polling	Link	Liberal	PC	NDP	Green	Libertarian	Other	Type of poll	Sample size	Margin of Error	
Election 2014	June 12, 2014	HTML	38.65	31.25	23.75	4.84		1.51	Ballot	4,851,333		
Forum Research	June 11, 2014	PDF	41	35	20	3		1	IVR	1,054	±3%	19 20
EKOS^{[2]}	June 11, 2014	PDF	37.3	31.3	19.2	8.2		3.9	IVR	1,311	±2.7%	19 20
Abacus Data^{[2]}	June 11, 2014	PDF	35	32	26	6		1	Online	1,882	±2.3%	19 20
Ipsos Reid^{[2]}	June 11, 2014	HTML	33	31	30			5	Online	1,991	±2.4%	
EKOS^{[2]}	June 10, 2014	PDF	36.6	30.2	21.5	6.6		5.0	IVR	1,332	±2.7%	19 20
Angus Reid^{[2]}	June 10, 2014	PDF	36	32	26	5		1	Online	1,866	±2.3%	19 20
Forum Research	June 9, 2014	PDF	42	35	19	3		1	IVR	739	±4%	19 20
Léger Marketing	June 9, 2014	PDF	37	37	20	5		1	Online	1,050	±3.2%	19 20
EKOS^{[2]}	June 9, 2014	PDF	34.7	34.5	19.8	6.7		4.3	IVR	1,417	±2.6%	19 20
EKOS^{[2]}	June 8, 2014	PDF	35.9	35.9	17.6	7.7		2.8	IVR	1,331	±2.7%	19 20
Oraclepoll Research	June 8, 2014	PDF	35	36	24	5			Telephone	1,000	±3.1%	19 20
Abacus Data^{[2]}	June 7, 2014	PDF	34	31	28	5		1	Online	1,000	±3.1%	19 20
EKOS^{[2]}	June 6, 2014	PDF	34.2	35.5	20.5	7.4		2.4	IVR	1,767	±2.3%	19 20
Ipsos Reid^{[2]}	June 6, 2014	HTML	35	35	26			4	Online	2,140	±2.4%	
Forum Research	June 5, 2014	PDF	39	37	17	6		1	IVR	1,022	±3%	19 20
EKOS^{[2]}	June 5, 2014	PDF	33.9	34.9	20.5	8.4		2.3	IVR	1,690	±2.4%	19 20
EKOS^{[2]}	June 4, 2014	PDF	35.7	30.9	19.8	9.6		4.0	IVR	1,303	±2.7%	19 20
EKOS	June 3, 2014	PDF	36.4	31.0	19.3	8.4		4.9	IVR	997	±3.1%	19 20
EKOS	June 2, 2014	PDF	38.8	30.5	17.8	8.4		4.5	IVR	934	±3.2%	19 20
EKOS	June 1, 2014	PDF	38.5	33.7	16.9	7.8		3.0	IVR	927	±3.2%	19 20
Abacus Data^{[2]}	May 31, 2014	PDF	37	30	24	7		2	Online	1,000	±3.1%	19 20
Ipsos Reid^{[2]}	May 29, 2014	HTML	34	36	23			7	Online	868	±3.8%	
Forum Research	May 27, 2014	PDF	36	36	20	7		1	IVR	882	±3%	19 20
Oraclepoll Research	May 27, 2014	PDF	32	36	25	7			Telephone	1,000	±3.1%	19 20
Nanos Research	May 26, 2014	PDF	37.7	31.2	23.7	5.3			Telephone	500	±4.4%	19 20
Abacus Data^{[2]}	May 24, 2014	PDF	34	32	25	6		2	Online	1,000	±3.1%	19 20
EKOS	May 23, 2014	PDF	35.8	30.0	20.4	11.9		1.9	IVR	1,215	±2.8%	19 20
Ipsos Reid^{[2]}	May 21, 2014	HTML	31	35	28			6	Online	800	±3.9%	
Forum Research	May 20, 2014	PDF	41	34	20	4		1	IVR	1,136	±3%	19 20
Abacus Data^{[2]}	May 16, 2014	PDF	33	33	26	6		2	Online	2,000	±2.2%	19 20
EKOS	May 15, 2014	PDF	37.1	30.3	20.9	7.3		4.5	IVR	1,111	±2.9%	19 20
Ipsos Reid^{[2]}	May 14, 2014	HTML	30	39	24			7	Online	801	±3.9%	
Forum Research	May 12, 2014	PDF	38	35	21	5		1	IVR	996	±3%	19 20
Ipsos Reid^{[2]}	May 9, 2014	HTML	31	37	28			4	Online	821	±3.9%	
Innovative Research	May 6, 2014	PDF	38.8	32.8	19.9	6.5		2.0	Online	1,000	N/A^{[1]}	
Innovative Research	May 6, 2014	PDF	38.7	32.8	23.7	4.3		0.5	Telephone	500	±4.4%	19 20
Oraclepoll Research	May 5, 2014	PDF HTML	31	42	25	3			Telephone	1,000	±3.2%	19 20
Forum Research	May 3, 2014	PDF	33	38	22	6		1	IVR	1,845	±2%	19 20
EKOS	May 1, 2014	PDF	34.7	31.6	22.2	9.4		2.0	IVR	1,576	±2.5%	19 20
Election 2011	October 6, 2011	PDF	37.65	35.45	22.74	2.92		1.24	Ballot	4,316,382		

^{1} Innovative Research states, for Province Wide Online Survey, "Margin of error not applicable, online samples not random."
^{2} Data shown above for campaign-period polls are top-line results, typically among all eligible voters. However, certain pollsters additionally report results among "likely voters" in an effort to better predict the actual outcome of the election. When available, these alternative results are shown in the following table:

=== Likely voters ===
Polling firm	Last date of polling	Link	Liberal	PC	NDP	Green	Other
EKOS	June 11, 2014	PDF	42.2	35.9	16.9	2.9	2.1
Abacus Data	June 11, 2014	PDF	36	36	23	5	1
Ipsos Reid	June 11, 2014	HTML	30	36	30		4
EKOS	June 10, 2014	PDF	41.1	33.2	17.1	5.6	2.9
Angus Reid	June 10, 2014	PDF	34	36	24	5	1
EKOS	June 9, 2014	PDF	38.1	36.3	16.9	5.7	3.1
EKOS	June 8, 2014	PDF	42.2	35.4	13.9	6.4	2.0
Abacus Data	June 7, 2014	PDF	34	34	26	5	1
EKOS	June 6, 2014	PDF	40.7	35.7	16.3	5.6	1.8
Ipsos Reid	June 6, 2014	HTML	32	40	24		3
EKOS	June 5, 2014	PDF	39.5	35.6	16.7	6.6	2
EKOS	June 4, 2014	PDF	41.4	32.0	17.8	6.2	3
Abacus Data	May 31, 2014	PDF	37	35	22	5	2
Ipsos Reid	May 29, 2014	HTML	29	41	25		4
Abacus Data	May 24, 2014	PDF	36	33	24	6	1
Ipsos Reid	May 21, 2014	HTML	30	41	26		3
Abacus Data	May 16, 2014	PDF	33	36	25	5	1
Ipsos Reid	May 14, 2014	HTML	31	43	22		4
Ipsos Reid	May 9, 2014	HTML	28	42	27		2

=== Pre-campaign period ===
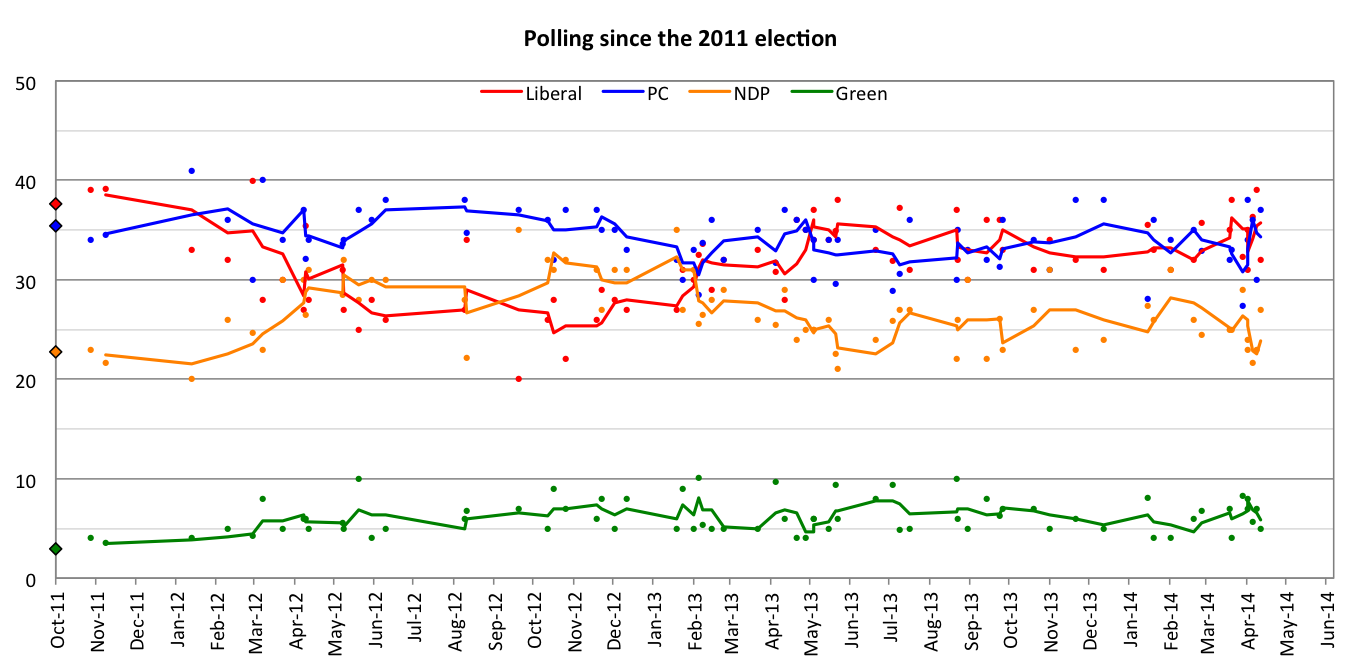
Evolution of voting intentions since the 40th Ontario general election on October 6, 2011. Points represent results of individual polls. Trend lines represent three-poll moving averages.

Pre-campaign period polling (October 2011 – April 2014)
Polling firm	Last date of polling	Link	Liberal	PC	NDP	Green	Type of poll	Sample size
Ipsos Reid	April 17, 2014	HTML	32	37	27	5	Online	813
Innovative Research	April 14, 2014	PDF	39	30	23	7	Online	800
Nanos Research	April 11, 2014	PDF	36.3	36.0	21.6	5.7	Telephone	503
Forum Research	April 7, 2014	PDF	31	38	23	7	IVR	928
Oraclepoll Research	April 7, 2014	PDF	35	34	24	8	Telephone	1,000
EKOS	April 3, 2014	PDF	32.3	27.4	29.0	8.3	IVR	1,234
Innovative Research	March 26, 2014	PDF	38	33	25	4	Online	1,017
Forum Research	March 24, 2014	PDF	35	32	25	7	IVR	908
Nanos Research	March 3, 2014	PDF	35.7	32.9	24.5	6.8	Telephone	500
Forum Research	February 25, 2014	HTML (subscription required)	32	35	26	6	IVR	1,014
Ipsos Reid	February 7, 2014	HTML	31	34	31	4	Online	828
Forum Research	January 25, 2014	HTML (subscription required)	33	36	26	4	IVR	1,222
Nanos Research	January 20, 2014	PDF	35.5	28.1	27.4	8.1	Telephone	500
Forum Research	December 18, 2013	HTML (subscription required)	31	38	24	5	IVR	1,044
Forum Research	November 26, 2013	PDF	32	38	23	6	IVR	1,126
Ipsos Reid	November 6, 2013	HTML	34	31	31	5	Online	832
Forum Research	October 25, 2013	HTML (subscription required)	31	34	27	7	IVR	1,049
Forum Research	October 1, 2013	HTML (subscription required)	33	36	23	7	IVR	1,093
Nanos Research	September 29, 2013	PDF	36.0	31.3	26.1	6.3	Telephone	500
Campaign Research	September 19, 2013	PDF	36	32	22	8	IVR	1,414
Abacus Data	September 4, 2013	PDF	30	33	30	5	Online	1,000
Forum Research	August 28, 2013	PDF	32	35	26	6	IVR	1,063
Innovative Research	August 27, 2013	HTML	37	30	22	10	Telephone	600
Forum Research	July 22, 2013	PDF	31	36	27	5	IVR	914
Nanos Research	July 14, 2013	PDF	37.2	30.6	27.0	4.9	Telephone	500
EKOS	July 9, 2013	PDF	31.9	28.9	25.9	9.4	IVR	830
Forum Research	June 26, 2013	PDF	33	35	24	8	IVR	1,037
Forum Research	May 28, 2013	PDF	38	34	21	6	IVR	918
EKOS	May 26, 2013	HTML	34.9	29.6	22.6	9.4	IVR	1,152
Ipsos Reid	May 21, 2013	HTML	34	34	26	5	Online	1,772
Abacus Data	May 9, 2013	PDF	34	34	25	6	Online	1,185
Innovative Research	May 9, 2013	PDF	37	30	25	6	Telephone	610
Forum Research	May 3, 2013	PDF	35	35	25	4	IVR	869
Forum Research	April 26, 2013	PDF	36	36	24	4	IVR	1,133
Ipsos Reid	April 17, 2013	HTML	28	37	29	6	Online	1,360
EKOS	April 10, 2013	PDF	30.8	31.7	25.5	9.7	IVR	1,084
Forum Research	March 27, 2013	PDF	33	35	26	5	IVR	1,156
Forum Research	March 1, 2013	PDF	32	32	29	5	IVR	2,773
Forum Research	February 20, 2013	PDF	29	36	28	5	IVR	1,053
Nanos Research	February 13, 2013	PDF	33.6	33.7	26.5	5.4	Telephone	500
EKOS	February 10, 2013	PDF	32.5	28.5	25.6	10.1	IVR	1,797
Abacus Data	February 6, 2013	PDF	30	33	31	5	Online	1,020
Innovative Research	January 29, 2013	PDF	31	30	27	9	Telephone	446
Forum Research	January 24, 2013	PDF	27	32	35	5	IVR	1,108
Forum Research	December 17, 2012	PDF	27	33	31	8	IVR	990
Abacus Data	December 8, 2012	PDF	28	35	31	5	Online	821
Forum Research	November 28, 2012	PDF	29	35	27	8	IVR	1,127
Oraclepoll Research	November 24, 2012	PDF	26	37	31	6	Telephone	
Forum Research	October 31, 2012	PDF	22	37	32	7	IVR	1,102
Innovative Research	October 22, 2012	PDF	28	32	31	9	Telephone	600
Angus Reid	October 17, 2012	PDF	26	36	32	5	Online	802
Forum Research	September 25, 2012	PDF	20	37	35	7	IVR	851
Nanos Research	August 16, 2012	PDF	34.0	34.7	22.1	6.8	Telephone	1,000
Forum Research	August 15, 2012	PDF	27	38	28	6	IVR	1,021
Forum Research	June 15, 2012	PDF	26	38	30	5	IVR	1,098
Forum Research	June 4, 2012	PDF	28	36	30	4	IVR	1,038
Environics	May 25, 2012	PDF	25	37	28	10	Telephone	500
Forum Research	May 14, 2012	PDF	27	34	32	5	IVR	1,072
Nanos Research	May 13, 2012	PDF	31.0	33.6	28.5	5.6	Telephone	500
Forum Research	April 17, 2012	PDF	28	34	31	5	IVR	1,084
Nanos Research	April 15, 2012	PDF	35.4	32.1	26.5	6.0	Telephone	501
Environics	April 13, 2012	HTML	27	37	30	6	Telephone	500
Forum Research	March 28, 2012	PDF	30	34	30	5	IVR	1,131
Forum Research	March 13, 2012	PDF	28	40	23	8	IVR	1,065
Nanos Research	March 5, 2012	PDF	39.9	30.0	24.7	4.3	Telephone	500
Forum Research	February 15, 2012	PDF	32	36	26	5	IVR	1,218
Forum Research	January 18, 2012	PDF	33	41	20	4	IVR	1,041
Nanos Research	November 13, 2011	PDF	39.1	34.5	21.6	3.5	Telephone	500
Innovative Research	November 2, 2011	PDF	39	34	23	4	Online	545
Election 2011	October 6, 2011	PDF	37.65	35.45	22.74	2.92	Ballot	4,316,382
