= Andrea Khanjin =

Member of Provincial Parliament for Barrie-Innisfil

The Honourable Andrea Khanjin ECO MPP
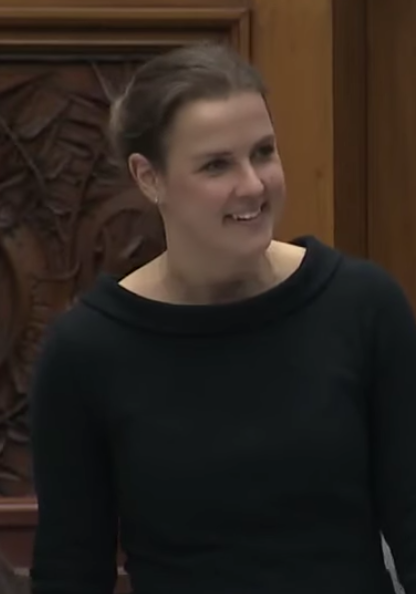
- Khanjin in 2019

Ontario Minister of the Environment, Conservation and Parks
- In office September 22, 2023 – March 19, 2025
- Premier: Doug Ford
- Preceded by: David Piccini
- Succeeded by: Todd J. McCarthy

Member of the Ontario Provincial Parliament for Barrie—Innisfil
- Incumbent
- Assumed office June 7, 2018
- Preceded by: Riding established

Personal details
- Born: December 27, 1987 (age 38) Moscow, Soviet Union
- Party: Progressive Conservative
- Spouse: Kevin Royal
- Children: 2
- Education: University of Ottawa
- Occupation: Politician
- Website: https://andreampp.com/

Andrea Daria Khanjin MPP (born December 27, 1987) is a Canadian politician who served as the Ontario minister of the environment, conservation and parks since 2023 to 2025 and the member of Provincial Parliament (MPP) for Barrie—Innisfil since 2018. A member of the Progressive Conservative (PC) Party, Khanjin was previously her caucus' deputy house leader from 2020 to 2024 and deputy party whip from 2022 to 2023. She was also a parliamentary assistant from 2018 to 2023. Khanjin is the first Jewish woman to be a PC cabinet minister.

== Political career ==
Khanjin ran as the Progressive Conservative Party of Ontario candidate in the 2018 Ontario general election for the riding of Barrie-Innisfil, won with 22,121 votes, and defeated the Liberal incumbent by 16,576 votes. She was re-elected in 2022 Ontario general election.

Following her election in 2018, during Khanjin's first term, she served as a member of Finance and Economic Affairs, Estimates, and Government Agencies Committees. During this term she also successfully introduced a private member's bill and co-sponsored two other bills. On June 5, 2019, she introduced an Act to proclaim the Provincial Day of Action on Litter as her private member's bill; on March 1, 2020, Khanjin and Cuzzetto introduced an Act to proclaim Sickle Cell Disease Awareness Day and Thalassemia Awareness Day, and; she co-sponsored an Act to proclaim the month of August as Emancipation Month on December 8, 2021. All of these bills proceeded and received Royal Assents.

=== Provincial Day of Action on Litter ===
To raise awareness of the importance to a clean environment of not littering, Khanjin introduced an Act to proclaim the Provincial Day of Action on Litter every second Tuesday in May in each year as her first private member's bill.

Ontario marked the First Provincial Day of Action on Litter at the Innisfil Beach Park in the Town of Innisfil on May 12, 2020.

=== Sickle Cell Disease Awareness Day and Thalassemia Awareness Day ===
On June 3, 2021, Bill 255, Sickle Cell Disease Awareness Day and Thalassemia Awareness Day Act, 2021 of Khanjin and Cuzzetto received royal assent. This bill proclaims that June 19 as Sickle Cell Disease Awareness Day and May 8 as Thalassemia Awareness Day in Ontario would increase awareness of these blood disorders in our province and dedicate a day to support individuals who have sickle cell disease or thalassemia and their families.

=== Emancipation Month ===
Andrea Khanjin co-sponsored Bill 75, Emancipation Month Act, 2021 proclaiming August as Emancipation Month.

== Electoral record ==
2025 Ontario general election: Barrie—Innisfil
Party	Candidate	Votes	%	±%
Progressive Conservative	Andrea Khanjin	22,048	54.11	+3.87
Liberal	Dane Lee	10,613	26.05	+7.95
New Democratic	Andrew Harrigan	5,442	13.36	–5.78
Green	Stephen Ciesielski	1,655	4.06	–2.25
New Blue	Sam Mangiapane	814	2.00	–1.37
Moderate	Anna Yuryeva	174	0.43	–
Total valid votes		40,746	99.32	
Total rejected, unmarked and declined ballots		278	0.68	+0.05
Turnout		41,024	41.30	+1.69
Eligible voters		99,332		
Progressive Conservative hold		Swing		–2.05
Source: Elections Ontario

2022 Ontario general election: Barrie—Innisfil
Party	Candidate	Votes	%	±%
Progressive Conservative	Andrea Khanjin	18,225	50.25	+0.28
New Democratic	Pekka Reinio	6,942	19.14	–9.46
Liberal	John Olthuis	6,564	18.10	+5.58
Green	Bonnie North	2,291	6.32	–0.89
New Blue	Ashlyn Steele	1,220	3.36	–
Ontario Party	Grace Dean	764	2.11	–
Independent	Benjamin Hughes	147	0.41	–
People's Front	Jake Tucker	119	0.33	–0.09
Total valid votes		36,272	99.38	
Total rejected, unmarked and declined ballots		228	0.62	–0.57
Turnout		36,500	39.61	–14.66
Eligible voters		92,137		
Progressive Conservative hold		Swing		+4.87
Source: Elections Ontario

2018 Ontario general election: Barrie—Innisfil
Party	Candidate	Votes	%
Progressive Conservative	Andrea Khanjin	22,121	49.97
New Democratic	Pekka Reinio	12,661	28.60
Liberal	Ann Hoggarth	5,543	12.52
Green	Bonnie North	3,190	7.21
Libertarian	Brett Dorion	396	0.89
Canadians' Choice	Jake Tucker	184	0.42
Trillium	Stacey Surkova	118	0.27
Moderate	Alexander Ryzhykh	59	0.13
Total valid votes		44,272	100.0
Total rejected, unmarked and declined ballots			
Turnout			55.4
Eligible voters		79,842	
Progressive Conservative pickup new district.			
Source: Elections Ontario
