= Barrie (provincial electoral district) =

Ontario electoral district
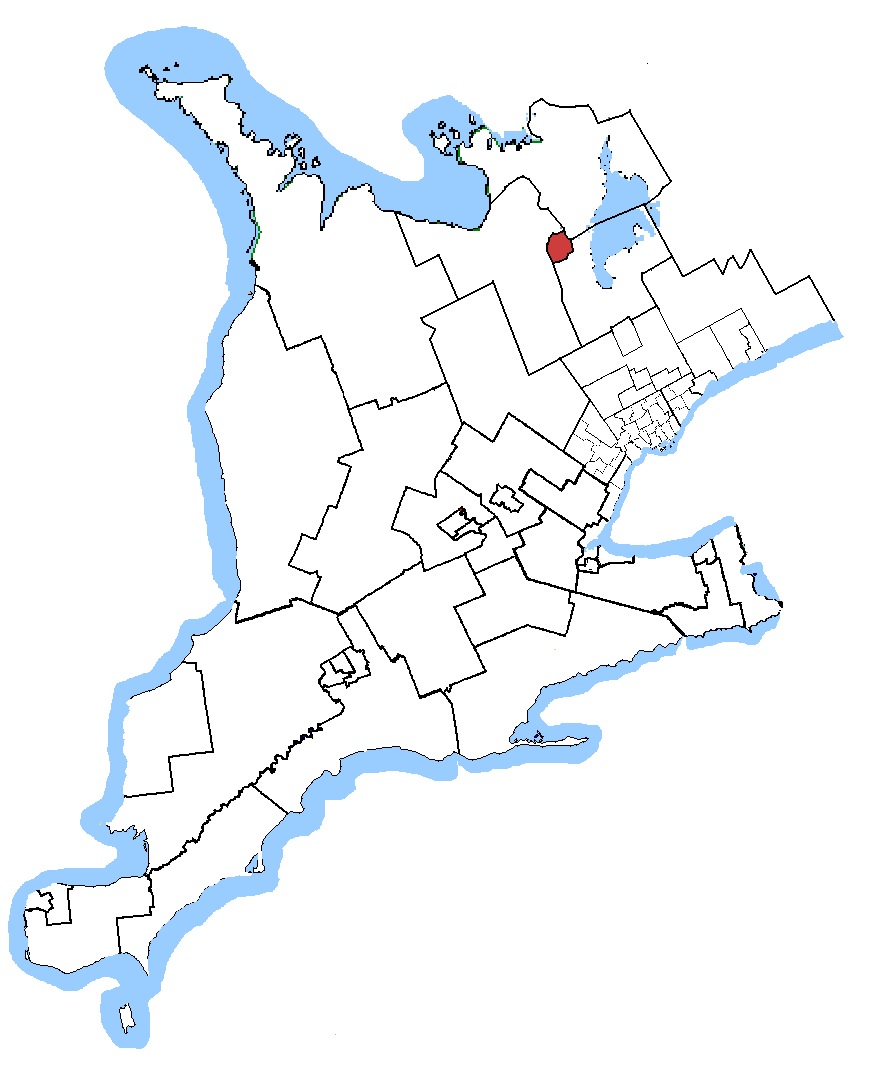
- Barrie in relation to other central Ontario electoral districts
- Coordinates: 44°24′30″N 79°41′01″W; Location of the constituency office (as of 12 July 2010)

Defunct provincial electoral district
- Legislature: Legislative Assembly of Ontario
- District created: 2005
- District abolished: 2018
- First contested: 2007
- Last contested: 2014

Demographics
- Population (2011): 135,711
- Electors (2007): 87,691
- Area (km²): 88
- Census division: Simcoe
- Census subdivision: Barrie

Barrie was a provincial electoral district in central Ontario, Canada. It was created for the 2007 provincial election. The entire riding was created from Barrie—Simcoe—Bradford.

The riding includes all of the City of Barrie.

In 2018, the district was dissolved into Barrie—Innisfil and Barrie—Springwater—Oro-Medonte.

== Members ==
Barrie
Assembly	Years	Member	Party
Riding created from Barrie—Simcoe—Bradford
39th	2007–2011	Aileen Carroll	Liberal
40th	2011–2014	Rod Jackson	Progressive Conservative
41st	2014–2018	Ann Hoggarth	Liberal
Riding dissolved into Barrie—Innisfil and Barrie—Springwater—Oro-Medonte

== Election results ==
2014 Ontario general election
Party	Candidate	Votes	%	±%
Liberal	Ann Hoggarth	19,916	40.69	+5.88
Progressive Conservative	Rod Jackson	17,667	36.10	–4.56
New Democratic	David Bradbury	7,975	16.29	–2.66
Green	Bonnie North	3,018	6.17	+1.74
Libertarian	Darren Roskam	366	0.75	+0.01
Total valid votes		48,942	98.37	
Total rejected, unmarked and declined ballots		811	1.63	+1.21
Turnout		49,753	49.18	+3.18
Eligible voters		101,169		
Liberal gain from Progressive Conservative		Swing		+5.22
Source: Elections Ontario

2011 Ontario general election
Party	Candidate	Votes	%	±%
Progressive Conservative	Rod Jackson	17,527	40.66	+1.44
Liberal	Karl Walsh	15,006	34.81	–7.39
New Democratic	Myrna Clark	8,171	18.95	+10.97
Green	Andrew Miller	1,909	4.43	–5.04
Libertarian	Darren Adrian Roskam	318	0.74	+0.37
Freedom	Matthew MacKenzie	179	0.42	–
Total valid votes		43,110	99.58	
Total rejected, unmarked and declined ballots		181	0.42	–0.02
Turnout		43,291	46.00	–5.95
Eligible voters		94,114		
Progressive Conservative gain from Liberal		Swing		+4.41
Source: Elections Ontario

2007 Ontario general election
Party	Candidate	Votes	%
Liberal	Aileen Carroll	19,548	42.20
Progressive Conservative	Joe Tascona	18,167	39.22
Green	Erich Jacoby-Hawkins	4,385	9.47
New Democratic	Larry Taylor	3,700	7.99
Family Coalition	Roberto Sales	173	0.37
Libertarian	Paolo Fabrizio	168	0.36
Independent	Darren Adrian Roskam	102	0.22
Independent	Daniel Gray Predie	77	0.17
Total valid votes		46,320	99.57
Total rejected, unmarked and declined ballots		202	0.43
Turnout		46,522	51.95
Eligible voters		89,548	
Liberal pickup new district.			
Source: Elections Ontario

== 2007 electoral reform referendum ==
2007 Ontario electoral reform referendum
Side	Votes	%
First Past the Post	27,941	61.6
Mixed member proportional	17,391	38.4
Total valid votes	45,332	100.0

== Sources ==
- Elections Ontario Past Election Results

== Riding associations ==
- Barrie Green Party
- Barrie Liberal Riding Associations
- Barrie NDP Riding Association
- Barrie Provincial Progressive Conservative Association
