= Unemployment in Ontario =

Ontarians without work

Unemployment in Ontario is the measure indicating the number of Ontarians "without work, are available for work, and are actively seeking work". The rate of unemployment is measured by Statistics Canada using a Labour Force Survey. In September 2018 approximately 452,900 people were deemed unemployed in Ontario. With an Unemployment rate of roughly 5.9% Ontario is even with the Canada's overall unemployment level. The Unemployment rate is quite stable from month to month with an approximate 0.2% fluctuation. Since 2013 Ontario's Unemployment rate has dropped 2.0%.

== Unemployment by demographic group ==
=== Age ===
As of 2018, the majority of individuals unemployed in Ontario were between the ages of 25 and 54. This reflects the fact that most of Ontario's workers - 64% of the overall labour force as of 2018 - are in the 25 to 54 demographic. Yet while 25-54 year-olds make up the majority of the unemployed, as of 2018 they had the lowest unemployment rate of any demographic, at 5.0 percent. The 15 to 24 year-old age group has the highest unemployment rate at 12.2% (2018).

==== Ontario's Unemployment rate by Age Groupings (Statistics Canada estimates) ====
Age Group		Sep-17	Sep-18
15 to 24 years	Seasonally adjusted (percentage)	10.6	12.2
25 to 54 years	Seasonally adjusted (percentage)	5.2	5
55 years and over	Seasonally adjusted (percentage)	3.9	4.2

=== Gender ===
As of 2018, men and women in Ontario experienced comparable unemployment rates of approximately six percent. Unemployment rose between September, 2017 and September, 2018, with a larger increase in unemployment being experienced by females.

==== Unemployment Rates (Statistics Canada estimates) ====
Sex		Sep-17	Sep-18
Both sexes	Seasonally adjusted (percentage)	5.7	5.9
Males	Seasonally adjusted (percentage)	6.1	5.8
Females	Seasonally adjusted (percentage)	5.2	6

=== Recent Immigrants and First Nations ===
Immigrants, especially recent immigrants, face challenges with unemployment. Inuit and First Nations people also have higher rates of unemployment.

== Unemployment by region ==
In recent years following the Great Recession, regions or cities such as Windsor, Oshawa, London and Peterborough, heavily dependent on auto manufacturing have been severely impacted by unemployment. In December 2013 Toronto proper unemployment rate deteriorated to 10.1%.

== Solutions ==
Issues related to creating employment involve many socio-political-economic-environmental factors and complexities. In Ontario, centre and left leaning governments have supported strong infrastructure building and social safety net policies while right leaning governments have pursued lower taxes and government spending policies. Regardless of government policies external factors such as Global recession, change in technologies, lower labour costs and lack of strong regulations in developing countries impact unemployment in Ontario.

=== Social safety net ===
Canada has a federal Employment Insurance system which covers workers for several months immediately after they lose work. Ontario also provides various social assistance services for those in need.

=== Infrastructure ===
Stable political and social systems, corruption free and efficient government operations, quality education, health, transportation, energy, information and communication, water and sanitation and financial systems help create employment and improve private sector productivity. According to The Economic Impact of Ontario’s Infrastructure Investment Program report published by Conference Board of Canada, "Economic activity linked to these investments supports employment in the province – on average 167,000 jobs per year are due to infrastructure spending. What is less obvious, but just as crucial, is that infrastructure boosts private-sector productivity, adding about $1,000 per year to the income of every Ontarian".

=== Skills training and trades ===
Skills training and promotion of trades through apprenticeship programs has been identified as a main component in closing Ontario's skills gap, thus better matching available employment opportunities with the labour force.

=== Entrepreneurs incubation ===
Education and University systems that foster and incubate innovation, entrepreneurship and self-employment have been identified as a growth area for Ontario to help reduce unemployment.

== See also ==
- List of Canadian provinces by unemployment rate
