= List of mayors of Waterloo, Ontario =

Mayor of Waterloo
- Incumbent; Shannon Weber since 2026
- Style: Mayor, His/Her Worship
- Member of: City Council
- Reports to: City Council
- Seat: Waterloo City Hall (Waterloo, Ontario, Canada)
- Appointer: Directly elected by the residents of Waterloo
- Formation: 1857; 169 years ago (Reeve); 1876; 150 years ago (Mayor)
- First holder: Moses Springer

This is a list of reeves and mayors of Waterloo, Ontario, Canada. Waterloo was incorporated as a village in 1857, became a town in 1876, and a city in 1948.

== Village of Waterloo ==
Reeves:

- Moses Springer, 1857–1862
- Daniel Snyder, 1862
- John Hoffman, 1863–1866
- Moses Springer, 1867–1869
- George Randall, 1870–1872
- Moses Springer, 1873–1876

== Town of Waterloo ==
- Moses Springer, 1876–1877
- George Randall, 1878
- Christian Kumpf, 1879–1880
- Benjamin Devitt, 1881–1883
- George Moore, 1884
- William Snider, 1885–1886
- Jacob Conrad, 1887
- Christian Kumpf, 1888–1889
- George Moore, 1890
- William Snider, 1891–1892
- Walter Wells, 1893
- Robert Y. Fish, 1894
- Simon Snyder, 1895–1897
- Jeremiah B. Hughes, 1898
- George Diebel, 1899–1900
- David Bean, 1901–1903
- Jacob Uffelmann, 1904–1905
- Edward F. Seagram, 1906–1907
- John Fischer, 1908
- Andrew Weidenhammer, 1909
- Levi Graybill, 1910–1911
- John B. Fischer, 1912–1913
- John R. Kaufman, 1914–1915
- Dr. William L. Hilliard, 1916–1917
- William H. Kutt, 1918–1919
- Daniel Bohlender, 1920–1921
- William G. Weichel, 1922–1923
- William Henderson, 1924–1925
- William D. Brill, 1926–1928
- Louis F. Dietrich, 1929–1930
- William Uffelman, 1931
- Daniel Bohlender, 1932
- Walter W. Frickey, 1933–1934
- Henry E. Ratz, 1935–1936
- Wes McKersie, 1937–1940
- William D. Brill, 1941–1942
- Frank B. Relyea, 1943
- Albert R. Heer, 1944–1946
- Wilfred L. Hilliard, 1947

== City of Waterloo ==
- Wilfred L. Hilliard, 1948
- Vernon Bauman, 1949–1951
- Donald A. Roberts, 1952–1953
- Frank N. Bauer, 1954–1955
- Leo J. Whitney, 1956–1957
- Harold Paikin, 1958–1959
- James S. Bauer, 1960–1965
- Arthur C. Paleczny, 1966–1967
- Donovan P. Meston, 1968–1974
- Herbert A. Epp, 1975–1977
- Marjorie Carroll, 1978–1988
- Brian Turnbull, 1988–1997
- Joan McKinnon, 1997–2000
- Lynne Woolstencroft, 2000–2003
- Herbert A. Epp, 2003–2006
- Brenda Halloran, 2006–2014
- Dave Jaworsky, 2014–2022
- Dorothy McCabe, 2022–2026
- Shannon Weber, 2026-present
