= George Moore =

George Moore or More may refer to:

== Business ==
- George Moore (philanthropist) (1806–1876), English merchant and philanthropist
- George Moore (businessman) (1871–1947), New Zealand Salvation Army officer and businessman
- George S. Moore (1905–2000), chairman of Citigroup, 1967–1970

== Entertainment ==
- George Moore (novelist) (1852–1933), Irish novelist, short-story writer, poet, art critic, memoirist and dramatist
- George Henry Moore (author) (1823–1892), American writer and librarian
- George Washington Moore (1820–1909), New York-born British music hall impresario
- George Moore (radio presenter), Australian radio DJ, announcer and host
- George N. Moore (1844–?), early photographer in the Pacific Northwest
- George Belton Moore (1806–1875), English artist

== Military ==
- George F. Moore (United States Army officer) (1887–1949), United States Army general
- George G. Moore (1844–1925), American Civil War soldier and Medal of Honor recipient
- George Moore (Medal of Honor) (1837–1904), Union Navy sailor and Medal of Honor recipient
- George Davis Moore (1867–1947), American general

== Law and politics ==
- George Moore (SHK) (1709–1787), Manx politician
- George Moore (Dublin MP) (c. 1779–?), member of parliament for Dublin City, 1826–1831
- George Fletcher Moore (1798–1886), attorney-general of Western Australia
- George Henry Moore (politician) (1811–1870), Irish landowner, politician and supporter of tenant rights
- George Moore (1811–1871), landowner and high sheriff of Derbyshire
- George F. Moore (Texas judge) (1822–1883), Texas Supreme Court judge
- George DeGraw Moore (1822–1891), American politician and jurist
- George Moore (Canadian politician) (1845–1916), businessman and politician in Ontario, Canada
- George F. Moore (Idaho politician) (1861–1938), American politician from Idaho
- George H. Moore (1871–1958), Los Angeles city councilman, 1943–1951
- George Moore (Missouri judge) (1878–1962), Missouri attorney and United States federal judge
- George Dunbar Moore (1893–1979), Australian admiral and diplomat
- George Curtis Moore (1925–1973), American diplomat
- George J. Moore (1879–1949), Canadian-American lawyer and politician from New York
- Sir George More (1553–1632), English courtier and politician

== Religion and philosophy ==
- George Moore (priest) (died 1807), archdeacon of Cornwall
- George Foot Moore (1851–1931), Asian scholar, historian of religion, Presbyterian minister
- G. E. Moore (George Edward Moore, 1873–1958), British philosopher
- George More (recusant) (born 1542), English supporter of Mary, Queen of Scots

== Science ==
- George Moore (physician) (1803–1880), physician, author, grandfather of G. E. Moore
- George E. Moore (1920–2008), American doctor and cancer research
- George Thomas Moore (1871–1956), botanist
- George William Kent Moore, Canadian physicist

== Sports ==
- George Moore (cricketer) (1820–1916), Australian cricketer
- George Moore (footballer) (1884–?), English footballer for Birmingham
- George Moore (fencer) (1906–1977), British Olympic fencer
- George Moore (pentathlete) (1918–2014), American modern pentathlete
- George Moore (jockey) (1923–2008), Australian Hall of Fame jockey
- Stanley Moore (cricketer) (1886–1948), Australian cricketer, born George Stanley Moore
- George Moore (rugby league), Australian rugby player
- George More (footballer), Scottish amateur footballer
- George Moore (gridiron football) (born 1996), American football offensive lineman

== Other ==
- George Henry Moore (runholder) (1812–1905), sheep station manager
- George W. Moore, billiards champion
- George Moore, a leading character in Tom Stoppard's 1972 play Jumpers

== See also ==
- George F. Moore (disambiguation)
- George Moor (1896–1918), VC recipient
