= Kitchener-Waterloo (disambiguation) =

Kitchener-Waterloo may refer to:

- The cities of Kitchener, Ontario and Waterloo, Ontario, Canada
  - The Tri-Cities (Ontario) which include Kitchener, Cambridge and Waterloo.
- The Regional Municipality of Waterloo, which consists of the tri-cities and surrounding rural townships.

== Electoral districts ==
- Kitchener—Waterloo (electoral district)
- Kitchener—Waterloo (provincial electoral district)
