= Erb-Kumpf House =

Historic building in Waterloo, Ontario

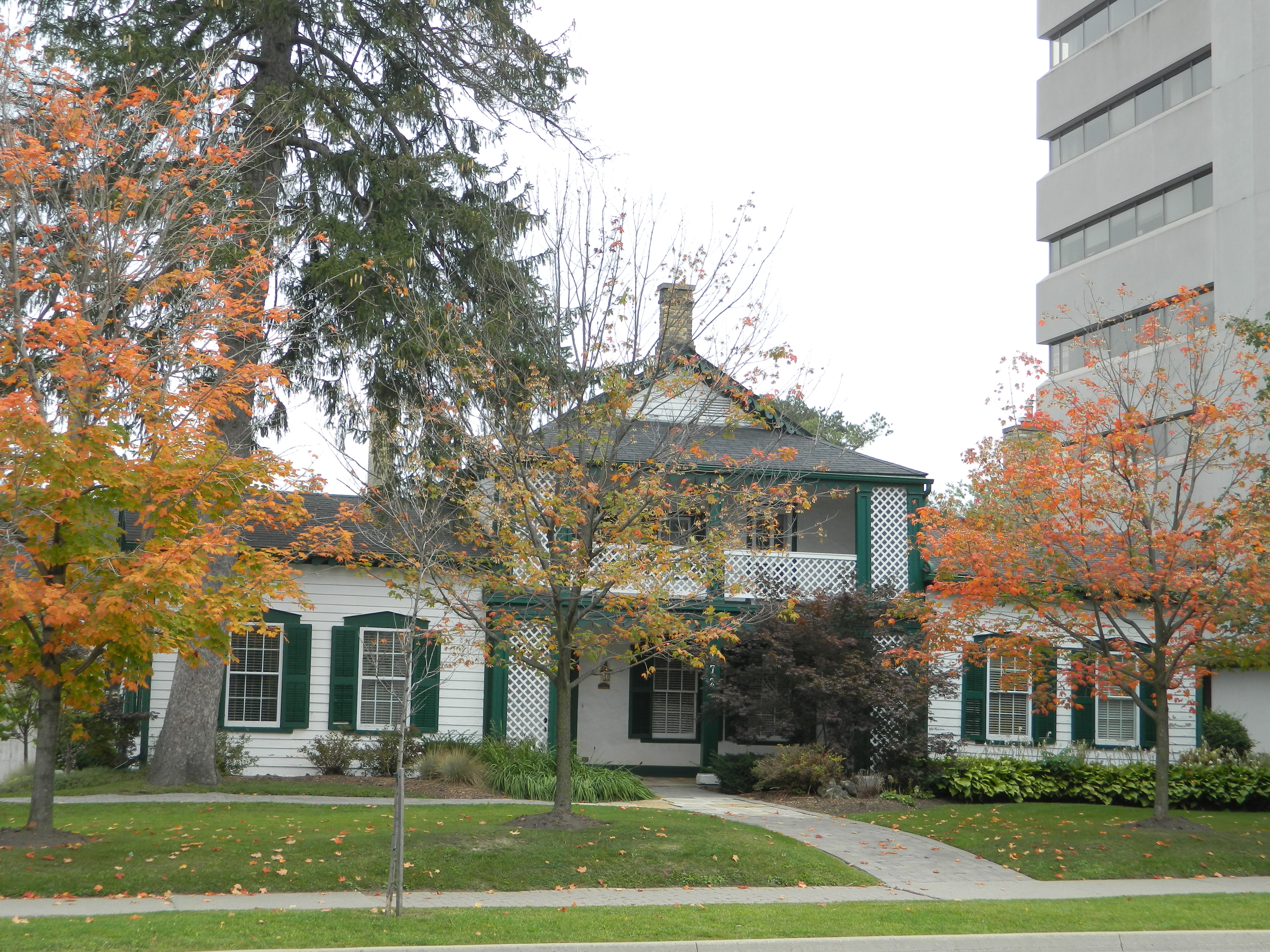

General information
- Architectural style: Georgian, Regency, Gothic, Trellis
- Location: 172 King Street South, Waterloo, Ontario, Canada
- Coordinates: 43.46101°N 80.51965°W
- Completed: c. 1812

Technical details
- Floor count: 2

Design and construction
- Architect(s): Abraham Erb

Ontario Heritage Act
- Designated: 1979

The Erb-Kumpf House (also known as the Kumpf House and the Abraham Erb House) is a two-storey house located on 172 King Street South in Waterloo, Ontario, Canada. The oldest portion of the house was constructed circa 1812 by Abraham Erb, the founder of Waterloo, likely making it the oldest home or one of the oldest homes in the city. In 1979, the Erb-Kumpf House was designated as a heritage home under the Ontario Heritage Act by the City of Waterloo.

As of December 2020, the house is occupied by the Oldfield, Greaves, D'Agostino, Billo & Nowak law firm.

== History ==
=== Background ===
Abraham Erb, the original architect of the house, came to the settlement that would become Waterloo from Lancaster County, Pennsylvania in 1806, settling on Lots 14 and 15 of the German Company Tract. Erb first built a sawmill on Laurel Creek (then Beaver Creek) in 1808 and built a gristmill on Laurel Creek in 1816. He also decided that he would build his home on what is now King Street/Waterloo Regional Road 15 (then the main road in a small community).

=== Construction and ownership ===
Abraham Erb built his home c. 1812 south of Laurel Creek and facing the mills he had previously built. Erb chose the location because of its access to the road and because it sat on a hill, making the house slightly elevated from the surrounding land. He owned and resided in the house until his death in 1830, when the house was passed onto his wife Magdalena Erb, who then passed the house onto her and Abraham's adopted son Benjamin Devitt in 1835. Devitt oversaw renovations made to the house in 1849.

The house was then passed onto Elias Snider and after that passed onto John Hoffman, who renovated the house in 1855, adding a second-storey front balcony and an ornate. The house came into possession of Christian Kumpf, a German-born Ontarian politician, in 1869. Christian served as mayor of Waterloo from 1879 to 1880 and from 1888 to 1889. He also owned the Waterloo Chronicle newspaper, was one of the founders of Dominion Life Assurance Company (later acquired by Manulife) and one of their first vice presidents, and served as Waterloo's postmaster for 42 years from 1862 until his death in 1904. In 1899, Christian sold the house to his son Ford Kumpf, who had been born in the house in 1877. Ford served as the Treasurer of Waterloo and the Clerk and Manager of the Water and Light Commission, served as the President of the Waterloo Red Cross Society and the Dominion Life Assurance Company, and was a reporter for the Waterloo Citizen. He also extensively involved himself in the Waterloo community by helping raise funds and volunteering in community projects.

The house remained in the Kumpf family until 1973, after which it briefly became a furniture showroom and then a law firm office, which it remains to this day. On February 19, 1979, the house was designated a heritage home by the City of Waterloo under the Ontario Heritage Act due to its historical significance. Sometime after 1979, the house was once again renovated.

== Architecture ==
The Erb-Kumpf House has a mixed architectural style due to the numerous renovations made over the course of the house's history. The house has Georgian six-over-six windows, as well as a Regency façade with two wings, Treillage, a Gothic bargeboard, and Doric columns.

== See also ==
- List of oldest buildings and structures in the Regional Municipality of Waterloo
- List of historic places in Regional Municipality of Waterloo
