= 2026 Waterloo Region municipal elections =

Upcoming elections in Ontario, Canada

The 2026 Waterloo Region municipal elections were held on October 26, 2026, in the Regional Municipality of Waterloo, Ontario, Canada, to elect Waterloo Regional Council, the mayors and city councils of Cambridge, Kitchener, North Dumfries, Waterloo, Wellesley, Wilmot, and Woolwich, the Waterloo Region District School Board (Public), the Waterloo Catholic District School Board, and the regional members of Conseil scolaire catholique MonAvenir and Conseil scolaire Viamonde (Public). The elections were part of the wider 2026 Ontario municipal elections.

(X) denotes incumbent.

== Waterloo Regional Council ==
=== Chair ===
Following the passage of the "Better Regional Governance Act", the provincial government will appoint the chair of the Region. Voters in the Region had elected the Chair since 1997.

=== Council ===
Waterloo Regional Council includes the chair, the mayors of the seven constituent municipalities (see below) and eight directly elected councillors from the three main cities:

List of candidates:

Candidate	Vote	%
Cambridge (2 to be elected)
Doug Craig (X)	16,840	35.18
Pam Wolf (X)	15,255	31.87
Bryan Causarano-Bolton	8,618	18.00
Prakash Venkataraman	4,304	8.99
Salman Arefin	2,851	5.96
Kitchener (4 to be elected)
Colleen James (X)	20,929	18.05
Michael Harris (X)	12,737	10.99
Matt Rodrigues (X)	12,640	10.90
Joe Gowing (X)	12,476	10.76
Simon Guthrie	9,006	7.77
Anna Meksavanh	8,419	7.26
Kevin White	8,268	7.13
Mac Graham	7,671	6.62
Ed Edwards	6,920	5.97
Eve Elizabeth Simson	6,313	5.45
Kim Huxted	6,286	5.42
Michael Wisniewski	4,254	3.67
Waterloo (2 to be elected)
Jim Erb (X)	13,994	30.12
Chantal Huinink (X)	8,605	18.52
Chris Moser	8,602	18.51
Lindsay Manary	7,316	15.74
Rami Said	3,561	7.66
Soo Bok Lee	2,208	4.75
Sarvesh Pratap Singh	2,182	4.70

== Cambridge ==
List of candidates:

=== Mayor ===
2026 Cambridge Mayoral election
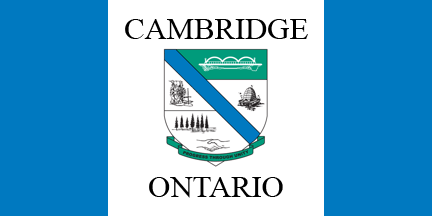
- October 26, 2026
- Turnout: 27.01%
	SH	RB	JL
Candidate	Scott Hamilton	Ryan Bolender	Jan Liggett
Popular vote	17,444	7,280	3,473
Percentage	56.82%	23.71%	11.31%
Mayor before election
Jan Liggett
Elected mayor
Scott Hamilton

Mayor Jan Liggett ran for re-election. She was opposed by city councillor Scott Hamilton, and businessman Ryan Bolender.

Mayoral Candidate	Vote	%
Scott Hamilton	17,444	56.82
Ryan Bolender	7,280	23.71
Jan Liggett (X)	3,473	11.31
Tony Chaves	1,328	4.33
Ihtsham Haq	728	2.37
Ken Roche	448	1.46

=== Cambridge City Council ===
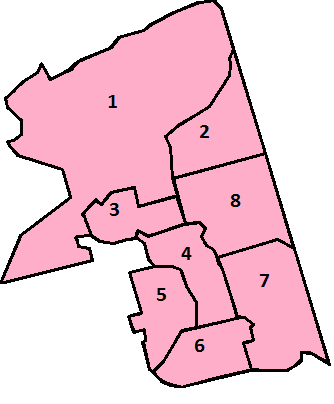
Map of Cambridge's eight wards

Candidate	Vote	%
Ward 1
Helen Shwery (X)	1,958	51.83
Jeff Donkersgoed	1,451	38.41
Saleem Shaikh	369	9.77
Ward 2
Mark Linton	1,334	29.25
Mike Devine (X)	1,305	28.61
David Craig	1,184	25.96
Matt Rogers	738	16.18
Ward 3
Corey Kimpson (X)	2,468	79.61
Shaun Spalding	443	14.29
Kiran Abid	189	6.10
Ward 4
Ross Earnshaw (X)	1,747	58.64
David O'Hara	850	28.53
Jawad Ahmad Malik	382	12.82
Ward 5
Sheri Roberts (X)	4,056	88.40
Nazim Shawh	532	11.60
Ward 6
Adam Cooper (X)	1,750	44.53
Barbara A. Harrington	1,283	32.65
Randy Carter	501	12.75
Chris McCormick	396	10.08
Ward 7
David Guerin	865	28.93
Manuel da Silva	804	26.89
John Teat	702	23.48
Tasneem Chhadiya	521	17.42
Dani Ieso	98	3.28
Ward 8
Nicholas Ermeta (X)	1,874	47.06
Chris Alward	800	20.09
George Fiddick	660	16.57
Cody Botelho	345	8.66
Arpan Pandit	303	7.61

== Kitchener ==
List of candidates:

=== Mayor ===
2026 Kitchener Mayoral election
- October 26, 2026
- Turnout: 22.17%
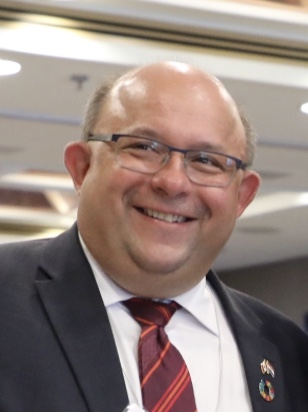

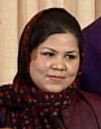
		CW
Candidate	Berry Vrbanovic	Cindy Ward
Popular vote	24,153	6,677
Percentage	55.43%	15.32%
	DA
Candidate	David Alton	Wazhma Frogh
Popular vote	5,659	2,600
Percentage	12.99%	5.97%
Mayor before election
Berry Vrbanovic
Elected mayor
Berry Vrbanovic

Mayor Berry Vrbanovic ran for re-election. Running against him were homelessness advocate David Alton, international human rights lawyer Wazhma Frogh, and businessman George Trihenea.

Mayoral Candidate	Vote	%
Berry Vrbanovic (X)	24,153	55.43
Cindy Ward	6,677	15.32
David Alton	5,659	12.99
Wazhma Frogh	2,600	5.97
George Trihenea	2,155	4.95
Manikantan Nair	1,757	4.03
Wali Khan	572	1.31

=== Kitchener City Council ===
Map of Kitchener's 10 wards

Candidate	Vote	%
Ward 1
Scott Davey (X)	2,843	67.51
Elizabeth Bate	1,277	30.33
Zahid Mian Mahmood	54	1.28
Haile Kiflai	37	0.88
Ward 2
Dave Schnider (X)	3,938	77.84
Soran Ibrahim	603	11.92
Derrick Rabethge	518	10.24
Ward 3
Jason Deneault (X)	1,003	34.21
Shawn Bradshaw	748	25.51
Ismail Mohamed	456	15.55
Joanne Delaney-Fraser	320	10.91
Matt Parker	205	6.99
Lurdes Jordao	200	6.82
Ward 4
Christine Michaud (X)	1,807	44.53
Vikki Poirier	1,119	27.58
Harry Scanlan	564	13.90
Anant Jain	305	7.52
Ibraheem Kappaya	263	6.48
Ward 5
Tracey Weiler	1,010	24.30
Rich Peers	1,003	24.13
Sumit Selhi	605	14.55
Fitz Vanderpool	556	13.38
Jon Massimi	506	12.17
Dimple Birdee	198	4.76
Muhammad Miqdad Hudda	195	4.69
Navjot Sandhu	57	1.37
Nate Bahlbi	27	0.65
Ward 6
Paul Singh (X)	1,870	54.06
Amber Louise Culley	814	23.53
Brooklin Wallis	775	22.41
Ward 7
Bil Ioannidis (X)	2,584	53.97
Nikki Rollick	1,328	27.74
Richie Nanan	876	18.30
Ward 8
Margaret Johnston (X)	1,515	38.94
Carly Pettinger	1,458	37.47
Wendy Creighton	477	12.26
Philip Molto	441	11.33
Ward 9
Debbie Chapman (X)	3,651	78.21
Tim Willcox	604	12.94
Mohamed Askalany	413	8.85
Ward 10
Sam Nabi	2,601	45.03
Stephanie Stretch (X)	2,689	44.83
Peter Gordon Piluk	310	5.17
Everton Dixon	235	3.92
Aalaa Rehman	63	1.05

== North Dumfries ==
List of candidates:

=== Mayor ===
Mayor Sue Foxton is not running for re-election. Running to replace her is councillor Rod Rolleman.

Mayoral Candidate	Vote	%
Prabhjap Sandhu		
Terry Knarr		
Rodney Rolleman		

== Waterloo ==
List of candidates:

=== Mayor ===
2026 Waterloo Mayoral election
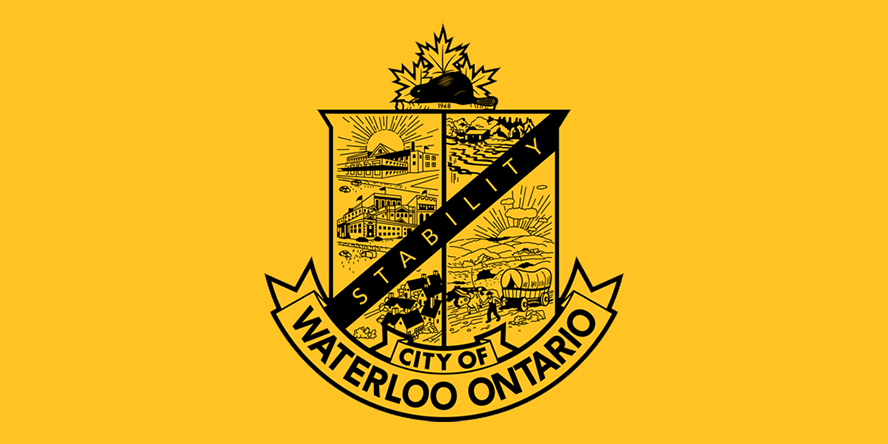
- October 26, 2026
- Turnout: 30.71%
Candidate	Shannon Weber	Dorothy McCabe
Popular vote	15,002	8,623
Percentage	52.05%	29.92%
Candidate	Jeyas Balaskanthan	Jamie Hari
Popular vote	2,425	2,186
Percentage	8.41%	7.58%
Mayor before election
Dorothy McCabe
Elected mayor
Shannon Weber

Mayor Dorothy McCabe ran for re-election.

Mayoral Candidate	Vote	%
Shannon Weber	15,002	52.05
Dorothy McCabe (X)	8,623	29.92
Jeyas Balaskanthan	2,425	8.41
Jamie Hari	2,186	7.58
Jerry Jiang	587	2.04

=== Waterloo City Council ===
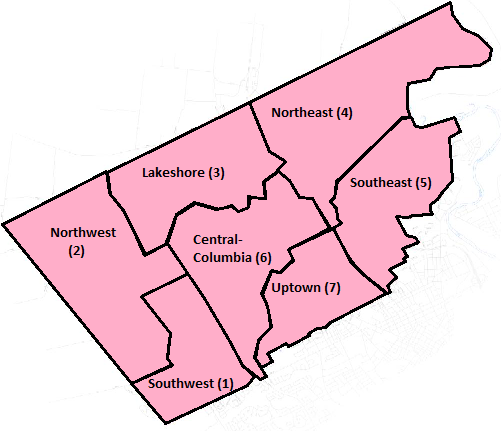
Map of Waterloo's seven wards

Candidate	Vote	%
Ward 1
Sandra Hanmer (X)	2,443	72.26
Joel Botter	938	27.74
Ward 2
Shawn Humes	859	21.23
Ying Susan Jiang	753	18.61
Janice Moore	573	14.16
Asma Al-Wahsh	507	12.53
Venkat Kondam	498	12.31
Khaled Berbash	448	11.07
Moraa Mochama	408	
Ward 3
Victoria Robertson	1,941	54.49
Hans Roach (X)	1,621	45.51
Ward 4
Diane Freeman (X)	2,149	48.81
Travis Restoule	1,982	45.01
Syed Tirmizi	272	6.18
Ward 5
Scott Piatkowski	1,377	31.13
Marty Rempel	1,273	28.76
Victoria Richardson	743	16.80
Eda Dede	607	13.72
Andrew Portwine	423	9.56
Ward 6
Mary Lou Roe (X)	1,934	58.38
Damian Mikhail	1,379	41.62
Ward 7
Julie Wright (X)	4,408	95.72
Abdullah	197	4.28

== Wellesley ==
List of candidates:

=== Mayor ===
Mayor Joe Nowak is running for re-election. Running against him is businessman Chris Martin.

Mayoral Candidate	Vote	%
Joe Nowak (X)		
Chris Martin		

== Wilmot ==
=== Mayor ===
Mayor Natasha Salonen is running for re-election. She is being opposed by Stephanie Goertz, co-founder and organizer with the Waterloo Region Grassroots Response to the Ukrainian Crisis, Ward 2 Councillor Kris Wilkinson, and homebuilder Clive Woolner.

List of candidates:

Mayoral Candidate	Vote	%
Natasha Salonen (X)		
Stephanie Goertz		
Kristopher Wilkinson		
Clive Woolner		

== Woolwich ==
=== Mayor ===
Mayor Sandy Shantz is not running for re-election. Running to replace her is Ward 1 councillor Evan Burgess, Ward 2 councillor Eric Schwindt, and Elmira resident Chane Ballantyne.

List of candidates:

Mayoral Candidate	Vote	%
Chane Ballantyne		
Evan Burgess		
Glenn Fern		
Eric Schwindt		
