= William Hilliard =

William Hilliard may refer to:

- William Hilliard (bishop) (1887–1960), Anglican bishop of Nelson
- William Hilliard (English MP) (died 1608), English Member of Parliament
- William Hilliard (Florida politician), served as Mayor of Tallahassee
- William Hilliard (publisher) (1778–1836), American publisher and bookseller in Massachusetts
- William A. Hilliard (1927–2017), American journalist
- William L. Hilliard (1868–1966), Canadian physician and politician in Ontario
