= Abraham Erb =

Canadian settler (1772–1830)

- Born: July 12, 1772; Warwick Township, Lancaster County, Pennsylvania
- Died: September 6, 1830 (aged 58); Waterloo, Upper Canada
- Burial place: First Mennonite Cemetery, Kitchener, Ontario, Canada
- Known for: Founder of Waterloo, Ontario
- Spouse: Magdalena Erb (m. 1804)
- Parents: Christian Erb (father); Maria Scherch (mother)

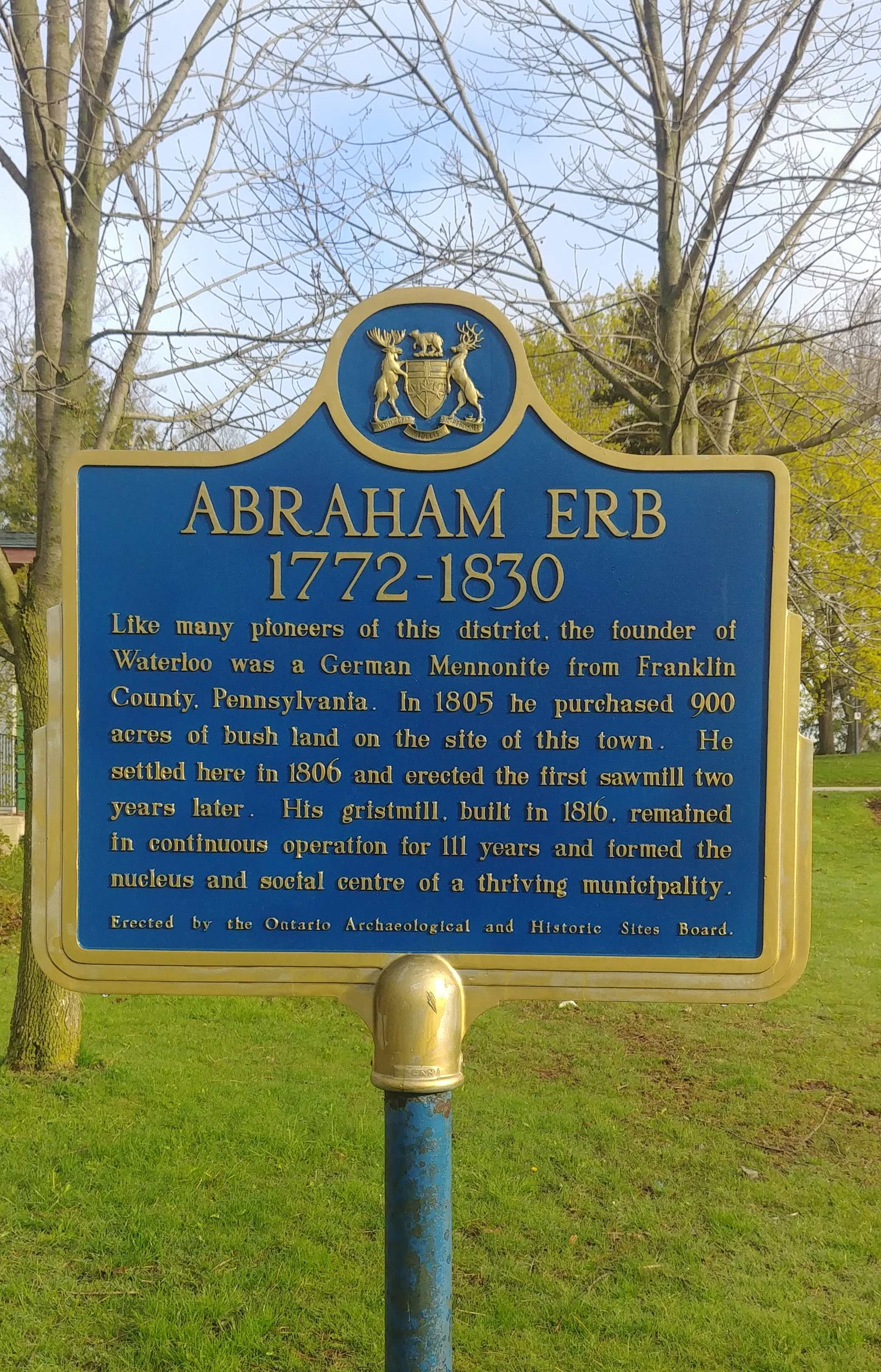
Abraham Erb 1772-1830 historical sign in Waterloo Park

Abraham Erb (12 July 1772 – 6 September 1830), sometimes called the founder of Waterloo, Ontario, was the first Mennonite settler from Pennsylvania. His brother John is considered the founder of the Preston community in Cambridge, Ontario.

Abraham purchased 4, 000 acres of land from the German Company Tract in 1806. He founded a sawmill that was instrumental in the development of Waterloo village. Abraham offered help to many immigrants from his native Pennsylvania area through the means of education, shelter, and employment as they chose to move from the United States to Upper Canada. He was married to Magdalena and had one biological child, who died at the age of seven, and two adoptive children. His adopted son was named Barnabas, a noted land speculator.

Erb also built what is now known as the Erb-Kumpf House in c. 1812, making it likely the oldest home in Waterloo or one of the oldest homes in Waterloo.
