= Petersburg, Ontario =

Petersburg
- Unincorporated community
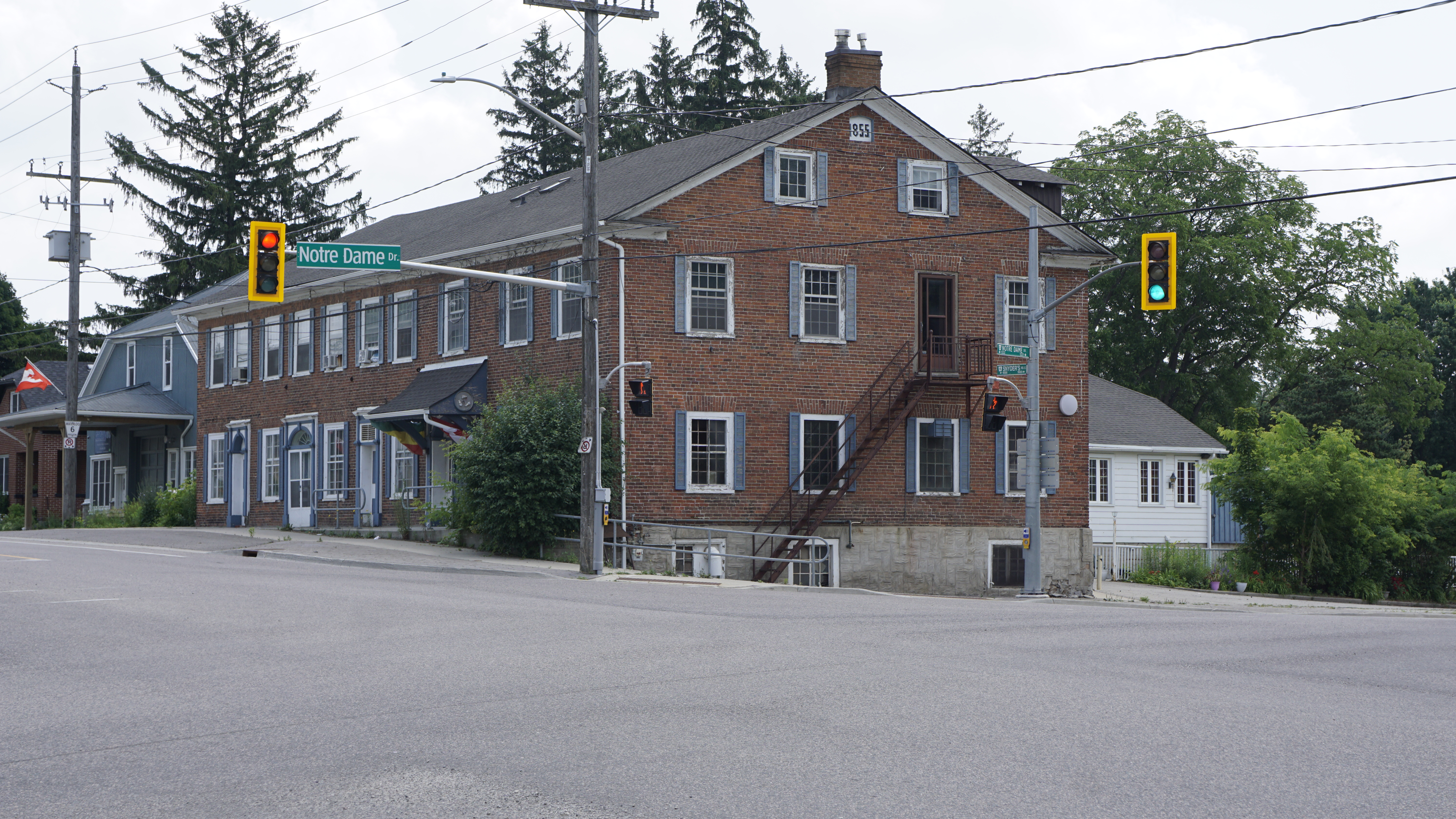
- Former Blue Moon Restaurant
- Interactive map of Petersburg
- Coordinates: 43.413530°N 80.605148°W
- Country: Canada
- Province: Ontario
- Regional municipality: Waterloo
- Township: Wilmot

Area
  - Land: 0.66 km^{2} (0.25 sq mi)

Population (2021)
  - Total: 374
  - Density: 566.7/km^{2} (1,468/sq mi)
- Time zone: UTC-5 (EST)
  - Summer (DST): UTC-4 (EDT)
- Forward sortation area: N0B 2H0
- Area codes: 519 and 226
- GNBC Code: FDOVR

Petersburg is an unincorporated community in Wilmot Township in the Regional Municipality of Waterloo, Ontario, Canada. It is recognized as a designated place by Statistics Canada.

== History ==
The village was settled and named after Peter Wilker, a native of Hesse-Darmstadt, Germany in the 1830s.

The locality had a school in 1842, a post office in 1849 and in 1856, the locality was a station on the Grand Trunk Railway.

== Demographics ==
In the 2021 Census of Population conducted by Statistics Canada, Petersburg had a population of 374 living in 147 of its 149 total private dwellings, a change of 10% from its 2016 population of 340. With a land area of 0.66 km^{2} (0.25 sq mi), it had a population density of 566.7/km^{2} (1,467.7/sq mi) in 2021.

== Notable people ==
- Harold Albrecht, member of the House of Commons of Canada from 2006 – 2019.
- Glen Cressman, ice hockey player.
- Albert Heer, mayor of Waterloo, Ontario from 1944 to 1946.

== See also ==
- List of communities in Ontario
- List of designated places in Ontario
