= Wazhma Frogh =

Afghan women's rights activist

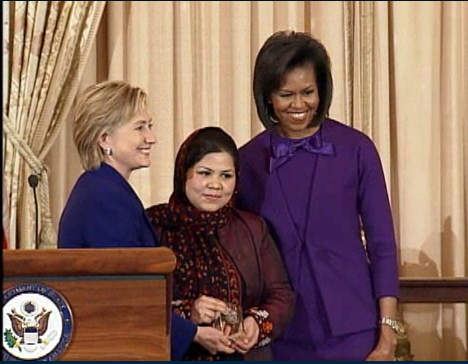
Wazhma Frogh with Secretary of State Hillary Clinton (left) and First Lady Michelle Obama (right) in 2009

Wazhma Frogh (Dari: واشما فروغ) is an Afghan–Canadian women's rights activist.

== Life ==
In grade 8, Wazhma tutored her landlord's children, so that the landlord would reduce her rent and she and her sisters could thus afford school. At age 17, she exposed poor living conditions and abuses of women in Afghan refugee camps in Pakistan while interning at a Pakistani newspaper. From 1992 to 2001, she organized community-based empowerment programs for women in Afghanistan while she herself lived in Peshawar, returning to Afghanistan in 2001. In 2002 she finished the first gender assessment of women’s conditions in Nuristan, Afghanistan. Frogh also supported the creation of Women Development Centres in the Kandahar, Ghazni, Herat, and Parwan provinces of Afghanistan.

Frogh was the co-founder and as of 2013 the director of the Afghan organization Research Institute for Women, Peace and Security. In 2013, she tried to visit the United States to avoid a militia commander who she identified in a report to NATO as a repeat rights violator. However, he continued to threaten her and her sisters and, although the U.S- based Institute of Inclusive Security invited Frogh to spend six to 12 months as a visiting fellow, her visa was denied.

She has also written for The Guardian on Afghanistan. She wrote in 2010 about the need to not take peace in her country at any price. She was concerned that women's rights would be sacrificed and criminals would be released.

She supports the U.S. ratification of the Convention on the Elimination of All Forms of Discrimination Against Women, which Afghanistan ratified in 2003.

Frogh received a 2009 International Women of Courage Award.

In May 2026, Frogh announced that she would be running to be mayor of Kitchener, Ontario, Canada in the 2026 municipal election. Her bid would prove to be unsuccessful, finishing with 2,600 votes — about 5% of ballots cast.

== See also ==
- Mina Mangal
