= Glen Cressman =

Canadian ice hockey player (1934–2019)

- Born: August 29, 1934 Petersburg, Ontario, Canada
- Died: June 1, 2019 (aged 84) San Diego, California, U.S.
- Height: 5 ft 9 in (175 cm)
- Weight: 155 lb (70 kg; 11 st 1 lb)
- Position: Centre
- Shot: Right
- Played for: Montreal Canadiens
- Playing career: 1955–1966

Glen Jacob Cressman (August 29, 1934 – June 1, 2019) was a Canadian professional ice hockey forward. He played four games in the National Hockey League for the Montreal Canadiens during the 1956–57 season. The rest of his career, which lasted from 1955 to 1966, was spent in the minor leagues.

== Career statistics ==
=== Regular season and playoffs ===
			Regular season					Playoffs
Season	Team	League	GP	G	A	Pts	PIM	GP	G	A	Pts	PIM
1951–52	Kitchener Greenshirts	OHA	3	0	3	3	0	4	0	2	2	0
1952–53	Kitchener Greenshirts	OHA	56	6	11	17	2	—	—	—	—	—
1953–54	Kitchener Greenshirts	OHA	59	20	28	48	10	4	0	1	1	0
1954–55	Toronto Marlboros	OHA	51	23	19	42	16	13	2	7	9	17
1954–55	Toronto Marlboros	M-Cup	—	—	—	—	—	11	7	6	13	2
1955–56	Chicoutimi Sagueneens	QSHL	64	12	18	30	7	5	0	1	1	0
1956–57	Montreal Canadiens	NHL	4	0	0	0	2	—	—	—	—	—
1956–57	Rochester Americans	AHL	13	2	1	3	4	—	—	—	—	—
1956–57	Montreal Royals	QSHL	34	11	13	24	4	4	0	0	0	2
1957–58	Montreal Royals	QSHL	64	14	21	35	8	7	0	2	2	0
1958–59	Chicoutimi Sagueneens	QSHL	59	15	26	41	2	—	—	—	—	—
1959–60	Kingston Frontenacs	EPHL	62	13	22	35	6	—	—	—	—	—
1960–61	Montreal Royals	EPHL	47	5	9	14	6	—	—	—	—	—
1961–62	Knoxville Knights	EHL	46	13	17	30	8	8	2	2	4	0
1962–63	Knoxville Knights	EHL	68	34	36	70	6	5	0	0	0	2
1963–64	Knoxville Knights	EHL	72	27	47	74	23	8	3	2	5	4
1964–65	Knoxville Knights	EHL	71	43	40	83	24	10	6	4	10	0
1965–66	Knoxville Knights	EHL	72	26	43	69	4	3	0	0	0	0
EHL totals			329	143	183	326	65	34	11	8	19	6
NHL totals			4	0	0	0	2	—	—	—	—	—
