= Dominion Life =

Canadian insurance company (1889–1987)

- Industry: Life insurance
- Founded: 20 March 1889
- Defunct: 25 September 1987
- Fate: Acquired by Manulife
- Headquarters: 111 Westmount Road South, Waterloo, Ontario

The Dominion Life Assurance Company was a Canadian life insurance company that existed from 1889 to 1987. The company was founded by a group of businessmen in Waterloo, Ontario and was built over the ensuing decades by managing director Thomas Hilliard. At the end of World War II, Dominion was Canada's ninth-largest life insurance company.

In 1957, the Lincoln National Life Insurance Company of Fort Wayne, Indiana acquired an 89 per cent stake in the company. Due to restrictive regulations on foreign ownership, Lincoln began in 1984 to seek a buyer for its share in Dominion. In 1985, Manulife acquired the company for $157 million. At the time of its acquisition, Dominion was Canada's 11th largest insurer. After the sale, Manulife operated Dominion as a subsidiary for a short time. At the beginning of 1986, Dominion's operations were merged into Manulife, and the company was disincorporated in 1987. During 1986, Manulife transferred its Canadian operations from Toronto to Waterloo, where they have remained since.

== History ==
=== Formation of the company ===
The genesis of the Dominion Life Assurance Company was a meeting in March 1888 at Snyder's Drug Store in Waterloo at 4 King Street South. The meeting included prominent local figures Isaac Erb Bowman (1832–1897), Peter Harvey Sims (1844–1920), John Shuh (1828–1901), Simon Snyder (1846–1902), and Thomas Hilliard (1841–1937). Of the group, Hilliard, who was a teacher and insurance agent, was the only one who was not a wealthy businessman. Hilliard was Anglo-Irish and a Methodist and had come to Ontario from County Fermanagh in 1847. He worked as a school teacher and owned two newspapers: the Glen Allen Maple Leaf, which he purchased in 1868, and the Waterloo Chronicle, which he purchased in 1867. In 1886, Hilliard got his first job in the insurance business as an agent and inspector for the Temperance and General Life Insurance Company of North America, and in 1888 he sold the Chronicle to David Bean.

Hilliard indicated to the group that he was interested in participating in a new enterprise, and Snyder suggested they form a life insurance company. At a subsequent meeting, the group debated whether to form a joint-stock company or a mutual and settled on a stock company. Shares were sold to residents of Waterloo Country by Hilliard, and the company's founders contributed $65,000 of capital. On 20 March 1889, the Act to incorporate the Dominion Life Assurance Company received royal assent. The founding directors were James Trow, Samuel Merner, Thomas Hilliard, John Shuh, Walter Wells, Simon Snyder, Christian Kumpf, Peter Sims, William Snider, Absalom Merner, Jeremiah Boone Hughes, William T. Parke, Peter Erb Shantz, Thomas Gowdy, John Ratz, John Youngs, Whitford Vandusen, James Innes, and Henry Cargill. By June of that year, Hillard had raised $260,000.

=== Operations ===
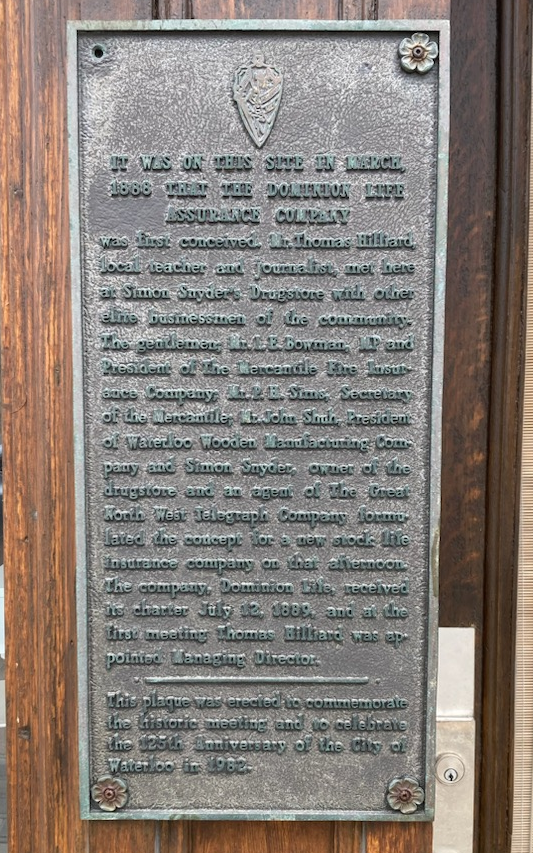
Plaque at the site of Snyder's Drug Store commemorating the formation of the company.

At the company's first meeting on 12 July 1889, Trow was appointed president and Hilliard was appointed managing director. The company's second employee was Hillard's secretary, Emma Roos (1861–1917), who would remain with Dominion until her death. Hillard and Roos set up their offices on the second floor of the Waterloo Mutual Fire Insurance Building at 28 King Street North. Within seven weeks of the company being granted its charter, Hilliard signed up 97 policy holders, and in the first year, the company had $231,000 of insurance in force in 158 policies. By 1890, this had reached $592,000 of insurance in 374 policies.

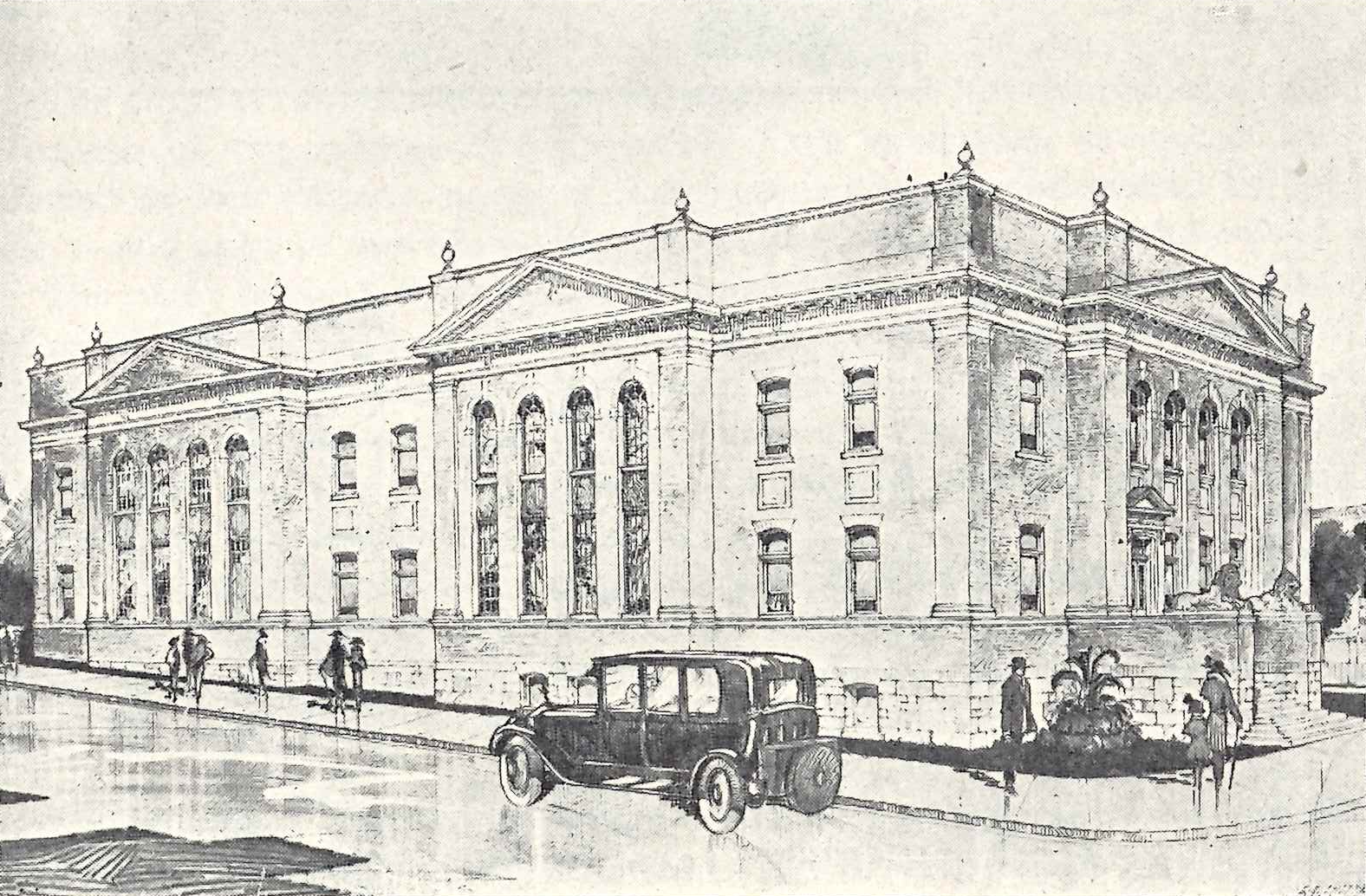
From 1912 to 1954, Dominion was headquartered in the former Mutual Life Building at 14 Erb

The company's third employee was Peter Roos (1865–1955), a relative of Emma's who joined the company in 1892 as an accountant. He would become the company's treasurer in 1906, and secretary-treasurer in 1910. In 1895, Ford S. Kumpf (1876–1960) was hired as the company's fourth employee. Through the 1890s, Hilliard pursued a growth strategy that saw the company expand into Western Canada. In 1912, the company bought the old Mutual Life Building at 14 Erb Street, when Mutual Life moved to its new headquarters at 227 King Street South. During World War I, Dominion invested heavily in government bonds. When the Spanish flu killed unprecedented numbers in late 1918, Dominion managed to meet all its claims.

In 1913, a group of Dominion Life directors established the Waterloo Trust and Savings Company. The business would go on to become one of the largest trust companies in Ontario before it was acquired by Canada Trust in 1967.

In 1919, Ford Kumpf replaced Hilliard as managing director. At the time, the company had $35 million of insurance in force. Kumpf had joined the company in 1895 but left in 1900 to pursue other interests. However, he rejoined the company in 1909 when he was elected to the board of directors, and in 1915 was appointed assistant manager. Under Kumpf's leadership, Dominion began doing business in Quebec in 1922, Newfoundland and Jamaica in 1927, Michigan in 1930, and Alaska in 1931. After the depression took hold in 1929, Kumpf appointed a team to reduce the company's expenses, strengthen its reserves, develop new marketable plans, and rebuild its investment portfolio. By 1939, the company was on strong footing, and that year, its 50th anniversary, it began doing business in Pennsylvania.

Kumpf stepped down as managing director in 1945, at which time the company had $250 million of insurance in force. His replacement was Alfred Adam Stephen Upton (1898–1995). Upton had joined the company in 1927 and set up the company's office in Montreal. Soon after, Upton moved to Ontario where later he would become superintendent of agencies. He was appointed assistant general manager in 1941, general manager in 1945, was elected a director in 1946 and was appointed managing director concurrently. In 1948, Dominion began operating in Delaware and Washington, D.C., and in 1949 in New Jersey in Ohio. In 1950, the company organised its group department and obtained a license to write health insurance. Upton began an organisational restructuring in 1947 that saw the creating of four assistant general managers to head the company's main divisions, with each given near-total autonomy to run his area. In 1949, the office of chairman of the board was created for senior director George Alexander Dobbie (1880–1951). He held the office until his death in May 1951, at which time it was left vacant.

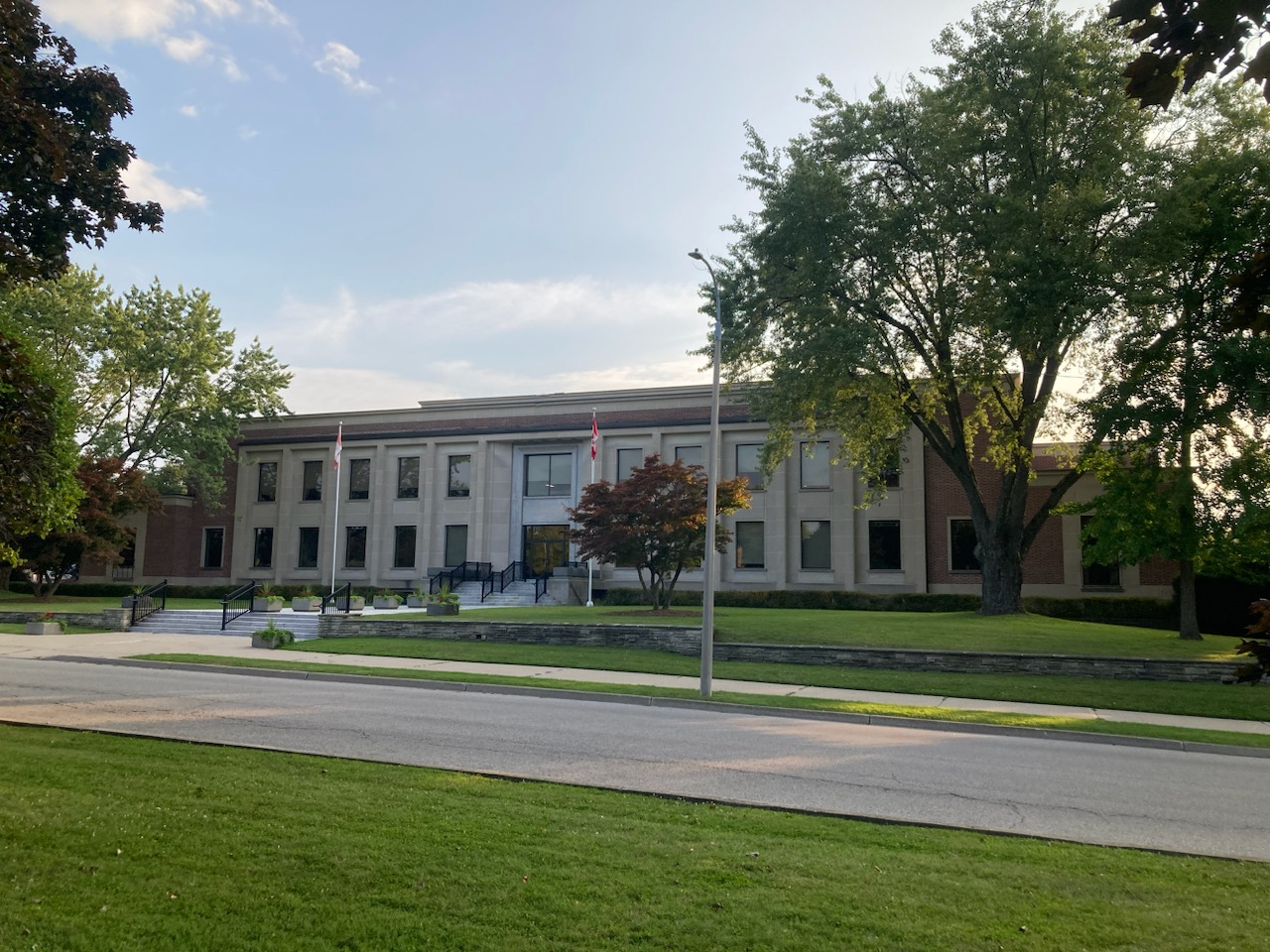
Dominion Life's new head office opened on Monday, 13 December 1954. It was designed by Mathers & Haldenby of Toronto.

By the late 1940s, the companies offices had become overcrowded. In the fall of 1946, Upton visited the 56-acre Forsyth farm adjacent the Westmount Golf and Country Club to inspect it as a possible site to build a new head office, and learned he could purchase it for $75,000. The following April, Upton visited the site with several company officers, then a month later brought Norman Dryden of the planning firm Dryden, Smith & Head. In 1947, Dominion acquired the farm property. The company kept six acres for itself to build a new head office, and sub-divided the remaining property into 172 residential lots. A building committee was struck in 1950 and Mathers and Haldenby of Toronto were hired as architects. By 1953, all the residential lots had been sold, offsetting the land purchase and building construction costs for the company. In May 1953 the company announced that construction was to begin before the end of the year, and the building contract was awarded on 30 July 1953 to Ball Brothers Construction Limited. The cornerstone was laid by Ford Kumpf on 21 February 1954. The ceremony was chaired by president Frowde Seagram, who related to the crowd, "this building surely is an indication of progress and of faith in our country and in the principles upon which the very structure of life insurance has been raised." The office opened on 13 December of that year.

For most of the company's history to date, the majority of shares were owned by a small group of shareholders. Faced with taxation problems due to the increase in the value of the shares, in 1956 the group began to accept offers for its stock. On 11 January 1957, the board of directors announced that the Lincoln National Life Insurance Company of Fort Wayne, Indiana acquired a majority stake of Dominion. After the acquisition, the office of chairman of the board, which had been vacant since 1951, was revived and given to Edward Daniel Auer (1903–1975), a vice-president of Lincoln National. At this time, the office of managing director was discontinued and chief executive function was transferred to the presidency. In January 1957, Upton succeeded J. E. F. Seagram as president, and remained in office until 1964. Following Auer, Dominion had three more chairmen of the board, each of whom was a vice-president of Lincoln Life. These were Henry Fairbank Rood (1906–1994), Ronald Gurr Stagg (1904–2002), and Gathings Stewart (1915–2003). Stewart stepped down in 1973 due to his workload at Lincoln, and the office was left vacant.

In 1958, Dominion began operations in Connecticut and opened an office in Nassau, The Bahamas. In October 1960, the company reached $1 billion of insurance in force, and in 1963 entered the field of individual health insurance. Upton retired in March 1964 and was replaced as president by Edward Gladstone Schafer (1906–1995). That year, the company's head office had 350 staff. Shafer had joined Dominion in 1924, became an associate actuary in 1947, vice president in 1957, and executive vice-president and director in 1961.

On 1 August 1971, John Sidney Acheson (1922–2010) was appointed Dominion's final president. Acheson was from Boissevain, Manitoba and during World War II served as an officer in the Royal Canadian Air Force. On 30 March 1943, his Handley Page Halifax was shot down over Germany. Acheson was the only one of his crew to survive, and spent the next two years in Stalag Luft III. Following the war, he graduated bachelor of commerce from the University of Manitoba in 1951. Shortly after graduating, Acheson was hired by Schafer at the Fort Garry Hotel in Winnipeg to work for Dominion.

=== Takeover by Manulife ===
In June 1984, Lincoln National announced that it intended to sell its 89 per cent stake in Dominion, citing restrictive regulations on foreign ownership. Specifically, under foreign ownership, Dominion was not allowed to execute takeovers without obtaining permission from the Foreign Investment Review Agency. Lincoln retained Salomon Brothers to find a buyer for its estimated $58 million share. By September 1984, Dominion's shares had increased from $65 in June to $125, and around 40 bidders offered to buy Lincoln's stake. In late October, Manulife became the successful bidder with an offer of $157.50 per share, or a total price of $157.5 million. The deal with Lincoln was concluded in March 1985, and the offer to the 11 per cent minority shareholders was mailed thereafter. During 1985, Manulife began to transfer its Canadian operations from Toronto to Waterloo, before the takeover came into effect on 1 January 1986. Through the first half of 1986, Manulife merged Dominion's operations into its own.

The last two employees of Dominion Life were president Acheson and senior vice-president Derek Eckersley (1922–2009). Eckersley's last day was Friday, 27 June 1986, while Acheson left his office for the final time on Monday, 30 June 1986. The Dominion Life Assurance Company was disincorporated on 25 September 1987 after a 98-year life.

== Leadership ==
=== President ===
1. James Trow, 4 July 1889 – 10 September 1892
2. James Innes, 13 February 1893 – 17 July 1903
3. Christian Kumpf, 23 October 1903 – 9 January 1905
4. Thomas Hilliard, 10 February 1905 – 8 February 1929
5. Alfred Frederick Stanley "Ford" Kumpf, 8 February 1929 – 30 November 1949
6. Joseph Edward Frowde Seagram, 30 November 1949 – 11 January 1957
7. Alfred Adam Stephen Upton, 18 January 1957 – 1 March 1964
8. Edward Gladstone Schafer, 1 March 1964 – 30 July 1971
9. John Sidney Acheson, 1 August 1971 – 27 June 1986

=== Chairman of the Board ===
1. George Alexander Dobbie, 21 October 1949 – 24 May 1951
2. Edward Daniel Auer, 18 January 1957 – February 1963
3. Henry Fairbank Rood, February 1963 – July 1967
4. Ronald Gurr Stagg, July 1967 – 25 July 1969
5. Gathings Stewart, 25 July 1969 – 9 February 1973
