= George F. Moore =

George F. Moore may refer to:

- George Fletcher Moore (1798–1886), Irish-born Attorney-General of Western Australia
- George F. Moore (Texas judge) (1822–1883), American judge, first chief justice of the Supreme Court of Texas
- George Foot Moore (1851–1931), American biblical scholar
- George F. Moore (Idaho politician) (1861–1938), American politician from Idaho
- George F. Moore (United States Army officer) (1887–1949), American military officer

== See also ==
- George Moore (disambiguation)
