= Waterloo City Council =

Waterloo City Council is the governing body for the city of Waterloo, Ontario, Canada.

The council consists of the Mayor of Waterloo and 7 ward councillors.

== Current Waterloo City Council ==
- Mayor, Dorothy McCabe
- Southwest Ward 1 Councillor, Sandra Hanmer
- Northwest Ward 2 Councillor, Royce Bodaly
- Lakeshore Ward 3 Councillor, Hans Roach
- Northeast Ward 4 Councillor, Diane Freeman
- Southeast Ward 5 Councillor, Jen Vasic
- Central-Columbia Ward 6 Councillor, Mary Lou Roe
- Uptown Ward 7 Councillor, Julie Wright

== See also ==
- List of mayors of Waterloo, Ontario
