= Catherine Fife =

Canadian politician

Catherine Fife MPP
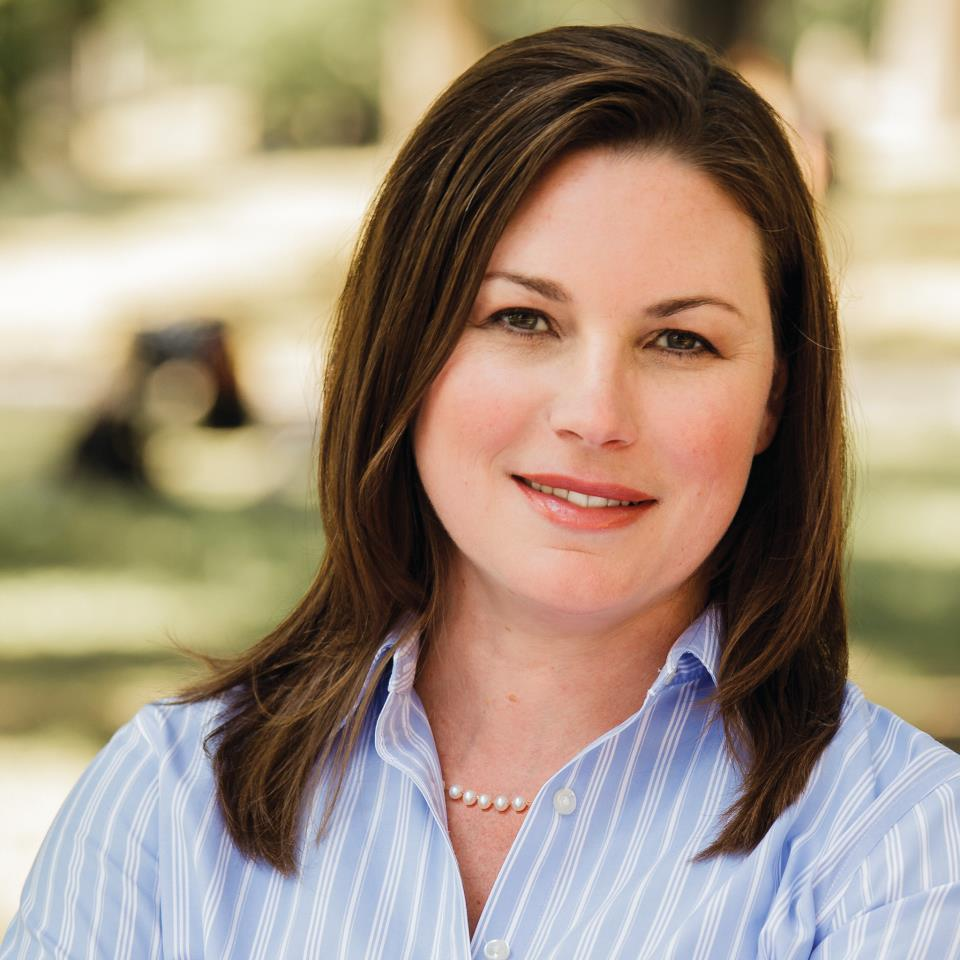

Chair of Commonwealth Women Parliamentarians
- Incumbent
- Assumed office October 7, 2025
- Leader: Marit Stiles

Critic, Finance and Treasury Board
- Incumbent
- Assumed office July 13, 2022
- Leader: Marit Stiles

Critic, Jobs, Employment, Research and Innovation
- In office August 23, 2018 – June 2, 2022
- Leader: Andrea Horwath

Critic, Finance and Treasury Board
- In office June 25, 2014 – June 7, 2018
- Leader: Andrea Horwath

Member of the Ontario Provincial Parliament for Waterloo Kitchener—Waterloo (2012—2018)
- Incumbent
- Assumed office September 6, 2012
- Preceded by: Elizabeth Witmer

Personal details
- Born: January 30 1968 or 1969 (age 57–58)
- Party: New Democratic
- Spouse: Dale Fife
- Children: 2
- Occupation: Research coordinator

Catherine Eileen Fife (born 1968 or 1969) is a politician in Ontario, Canada. She is a New Democratic member of the Legislative Assembly of Ontario who represents the riding of Waterloo. She has been a Member of Provincial Parliament since first winning her seat in the 2012 Kitchener—Waterloo byelection. Since 2025, Fife has served as the chairperson of Commonwealth Women Parliamentarians, the first Canadian in the role.

== Background ==
Prior to entering politics, she spent 10 years with the Toronto District School Board as an educational assistant, a school community advisor and a settlement worker for new immigrants. She was the research coordinator for the Partnerships for Children and Families Project at Wilfrid Laurier University. She lives in Kitchener-Waterloo with her husband Dale and their two children.

== Politics ==
Fife was elected to represent Waterloo/Wilmot as a trustee for the Waterloo Region District School Board in 2003, and was re-elected in 2006 and 2010.

In the 2007 provincial election, Fife ran as the New Democrat candidate in the riding of Kitchener—Waterloo. She came in third behind incumbent Progressive Conservative Elizabeth Witmer and Liberal candidate Louise Ervin.

After Witmer resigned to take a position with the Workplace Safety & Insurance Board, Fife ran in a by-election on September 6, 2012 to replace her. She defeated Progressive Conservative candidate Tracey Weiler by 3,748 votes. She was re-elected in the 2014 provincial election, defeating Liberal candidate Jamie Burton by 3,843 votes. She was subsequently re-elected in the 2018 and 2022 provincial elections.

She was the party's critic for Jobs, Employment, Research and Innovation and the Chair for Standing Committee on Public Accounts. As of September 7, 2024, she serves as the Official Opposition critic for Finance and Treasury Board.

== Election results ==
2025 Ontario general election: Waterloo
Party	Candidate	Votes	%	±%	Expenditures
New Democratic	Catherine Fife	25,055	50.23	+4.34	$56,231
Progressive Conservative	Peter Turkington	13,670	27.40	–1.93	$4,977
Liberal	Clayton Moore	7,839	15.71	+1.79	$31,031
Green	Shefaza Esmail	1,814	3.64	–3.38	$15,136
New Blue	Suja Biber	543	1.09	–1.53	$3,253
Ontario Party	Chris Martin	477	0.96	+0.16	$0
Libertarian	James Schulz	325	0.65	N/A	$0
Electoral Reform	Peter House	161	0.32	+0.09	$0
Total valid votes/expense limit		49,884	99.60	+0.08	$156,321
Total rejected, unmarked, and declined ballots		198	0.40	-0.08	
Turnout		50,082	53.02	+4.61	
Eligible voters		94,451			
New Democratic hold		Swing		+3.1	
Source: Elections Ontario

2022 Ontario general election: Waterloo
Party	Candidate	Votes	%	±%	Expenditures
New Democratic	Catherine Fife	20,615	45.89	−4.65	$79,926
Progressive Conservative	Andrew Aitken	13,176	29.33	−2.08	$55,487
Liberal	Jennifer Tuck	6,251	13.92	+1.75	$28,468
Green	Shefaza Esmail	3,110	6.92	+2.09	$7,305
New Blue	Vladimir Voznyuk	1,178	2.62		$4,970
Ontario Party	Benjamin Hufnagel	359	0.80		$0
Communist	Christian Shingiro	130	0.29		$0
Electoral Reform	Peter House	103	0.23		$0
Total valid votes/expense limit		44,922	99.52	+0.79	$130,920
Total rejected, unmarked, and declined ballots		216	0.48	-0.79	
Turnout		45,138	48.41	-13.39	
Eligible voters		93,522			
New Democratic hold		Swing		−1.29	
Source(s): "Summary of Valid Votes Cast for Each Candidate" (PDF). Elections Ontario. 2022. Archived from the original on 2023-05-18.; "Statistical Summary by Electoral District" (PDF). Elections Ontario. 2022. Archived from the original on 2023-05-21.

2018 Ontario general election: Waterloo
Party	Candidate	Votes	%
New Democratic	Catherine Fife	27,315	50.54
Progressive Conservative	Dan Weber	16,973	31.41
Liberal	Dorothy McCabe	6,577	12.17
Green	Zdravko Gunjevic	2,613	4.83
Libertarian	Andrew Allison	566	1.05
Total valid votes		54,097	100.00
Turnout			64.5
Eligible voters		83,924	
New Democratic pickup new district.			
Source: Elections Ontario

2014 Ontario general election: Kitchener—Waterloo
Party	Candidate	Votes	%	±%
New Democratic	Catherine Fife	20,536	37.43	-2.44
Liberal	Jamie Burton	16,534	30.14	+6.15
Progressive Conservative	Tracey Weiler	14,450	26.34	-5.49
Green	Stacey Danckert	2,859	5.21	+1.94
Libertarian	James Schulz	438	0.78	+0.49
Freedom	Nicholas Roy	43	0.07	+0.05
Total valid votes		54,860	100.00	
Total rejected, unmarked and declined ballots		623	1.12	
Turnout		55,483	54.95	
Eligible voters		100,972		
New Democratic hold		Swing		-4.29
Source(s) Elections Ontario (2014). "Official Returns from the Records, 039 Kitchener—Waterloo" (PDF).

Ontario provincial by-election, September 6, 2012: Kitchener—Waterloo Resignation of Elizabeth Witmer
Party	Candidate	Votes	%	±%
New Democratic	Catherine Fife	18,599	39.87	+23.20
Progressive Conservative	Tracey Weiler	14,851	31.83	-11.94
Liberal	Eric Davis	11,194	23.99	-12.05
Green	Stacey Danckert	1,525	3.27	+0.63
Libertarian	Allan Dettweiler	156	0.33	
Freedom	David Driver	95	0.20	-0.05
Communist	Elizabeth Rowley	85	0.18	
Independent	Garnet Bruce	77	0.17	
People's Political Party	Kevin Clarke	48	0.10	
Pauper	John Turmel	23	0.05	
Total valid votes		46,653	100.00	
Total rejected, unmarked and declined ballots		128	0.27	
Turnout		46,781	47.00	
Eligible voters		99,544		
New Democratic gain from Progressive Conservative		Swing		+17.57
Source(s) Elections Ontario (2012). "Official return from the records / Rapport des registres officiels - Kitchener—Waterloo by-election" (PDF).

2007 Ontario general election: Kitchener—Waterloo
Party	Candidate	Votes	%	±%
Progressive Conservative	Elizabeth Witmer	20,748	40.84	-2.24
Liberal	Louise Ervin	15,848	31.20	-9.18
New Democratic	Catherine Fife	8,902	17.52	+6.58
Green	Judy Greenwood-Speers	4,707	9.27	+6.08
Family Coalition	Louis Reitzel	598	1.18	-0.53
Total valid votes		50,803	100.00	
Total rejected, unmarked and declined ballots		313		
Turnout		51,116	53.63	
Eligible voters		95,319		
Progressive Conservative hold		Swing		+3.47
