= Waterloo (provincial electoral district) =

Provincial electoral district in Ontario, Canada

Ontario electoral district
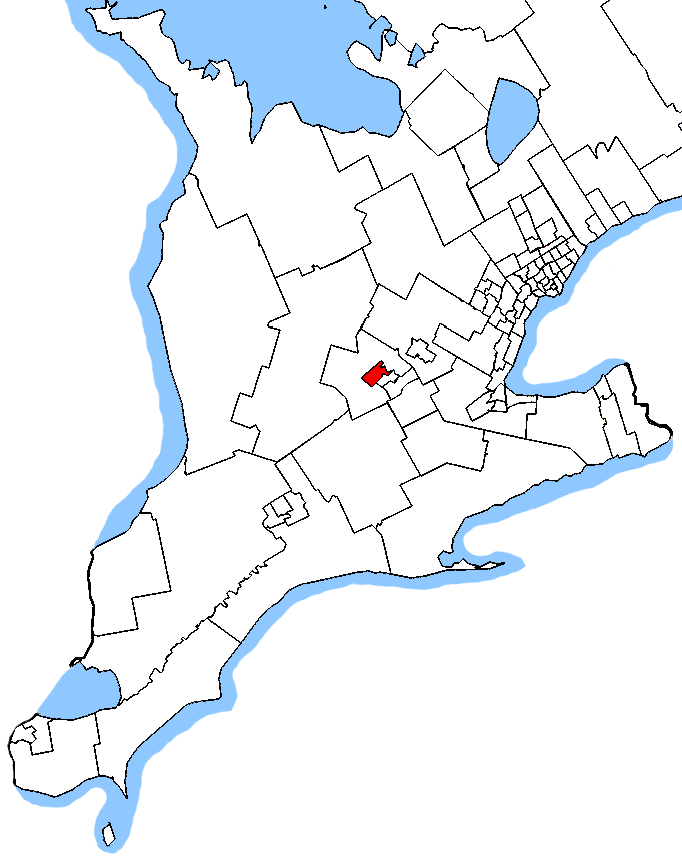
- Waterloo in relation to southern Ontario ridings (2015 boundaries)
- Coordinates: 43.48°N 80.52°W

Provincial electoral district
- Legislature: Legislative Assembly of Ontario
MPP
Catherine Fife
New Democratic
- District created: 2015
- First contested: 2018
- Last contested: 2025

Demographics
- Population (2016): 110,135
- Electors (2018): 88,580
- Area (km²): 75
- Pop. density (per km²): 1,468.5
- Census division: Waterloo
- Census subdivision(s): Waterloo, Kitchener

Waterloo is a provincial electoral district in the Waterloo Region of Ontario, Canada, that is represented in the Legislative Assembly of Ontario.

== Geography ==
The Waterloo electoral district contains all of the city of Waterloo plus the Bridgeport neighbourhood of Kitchener.

== Members of Provincial Parliament ==
Waterloo
Assembly	Years	Member	Party
Riding created from Kitchener—Waterloo
42nd	2018–2022	Catherine Fife	New Democratic
43rd	2022–2025	Catherine Fife	New Democratic
44th	2025–present	Catherine Fife	New Democratic

== Election results ==
Winning party in each polling division of Waterloo at the 2025 Ontario general election

2025 Ontario general election
Party	Candidate	Votes	%	±%	Expenditures
New Democratic	Catherine Fife	25,055	50.23	+4.34	$56,231
Progressive Conservative	Peter Turkington	13,670	27.40	–1.93	$4,977
Liberal	Clayton Moore	7,839	15.71	+1.79	$31,031
Green	Shefaza Esmail	1,814	3.64	–3.38	$15,136
New Blue	Suja Biber	543	1.09	–1.53	$3,253
Ontario Party	Chris Martin	477	0.96	+0.16	$0
Libertarian	James Schulz	325	0.65	N/A	$0
Electoral Reform	Peter House	161	0.32	+0.09	$0
Total valid votes/expense limit		49,884	99.60	+0.08	$156,321
Total rejected, unmarked, and declined ballots		198	0.40	-0.08	
Turnout		50,082	53.02	+4.61	
Eligible voters		94,451			
New Democratic hold		Swing		+3.1	
Source: Elections Ontario

Winning party in each polling division of Waterloo at the 2022 Ontario general election

2022 Ontario general election
Party	Candidate	Votes	%	±%	Expenditures
New Democratic	Catherine Fife	20,615	45.89	−4.65	$79,926
Progressive Conservative	Andrew Aitken	13,176	29.33	−2.08	$55,487
Liberal	Jennifer Tuck	6,251	13.92	+1.75	$28,468
Green	Shefaza Esmail	3,110	6.92	+2.09	$7,305
New Blue	Vladimir Voznyuk	1,178	2.62		$4,970
Ontario Party	Benjamin Hufnagel	359	0.80		$0
Communist	Christian Shingiro	130	0.29		$0
Electoral Reform	Peter House	103	0.23		$0
Total valid votes/expense limit		44,922	99.52	+0.79	$130,920
Total rejected, unmarked, and declined ballots		216	0.48	-0.79	
Turnout		45,138	48.41	-13.39	
Eligible voters		93,522			
New Democratic hold		Swing		−1.29	
Source(s): "Summary of Valid Votes Cast for Each Candidate" (PDF). Elections Ontario. 2022. Archived from the original on May 18, 2023.; "Statistical Summary by Electoral District" (PDF). Elections Ontario. 2022. Archived from the original on May 21, 2023.

2018 Ontario general election
Party	Candidate	Votes	%
New Democratic	Catherine Fife	27,315	50.54
Progressive Conservative	Dan Weber	16,973	31.41
Liberal	Dorothy McCabe	6,577	12.17
Green	Zdravko Gunjevic	2,613	4.83
Libertarian	Andrew Allison	566	1.05
Total valid votes		54,097	100.00
Turnout			64.5
Eligible voters		83,924	
New Democratic pickup new district.			
Source: Elections Ontario

== Student vote results ==
2018 Waterloo student vote
Affiliation	Candidate	Votes	%
New Democratic	Catherine Fife	1,116	45.31
Progressive Conservative	Dan Weber	519	21.07
Green	Zdravko Gunjevic	461	18.72
Liberal	Dorothy McCabe	285	11.57
Libertarian	Andrew Allison	82	3.33

== See also ==
- List of Ontario provincial electoral districts
- Canadian provincial electoral districts
