= Moses Springer =

Canadian politician

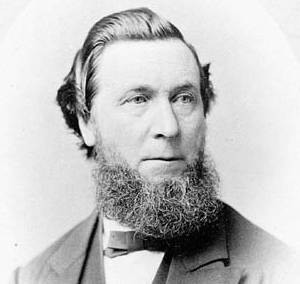
- Springer in 1873

Member of the Ontario Provincial Parliament for Waterloo North
- In office 1867–1881
- Preceded by: Riding established
- Succeeded by: Elias Weber Bingeman Snider

Mayor of Waterloo
- In office 1876–1877
- Preceded by: Position established
- Succeeded by: George Randall

Reeve of Waterloo
- In office 1873–1876
- Preceded by: George Randall
- Succeeded by: Position abolished
- In office 1867–1869
- Preceded by: John Hoffman
- Succeeded by: George Randall
- In office 1857–1862
- Preceded by: Position established
- Succeeded by: Daniel Snyder

Personal details
- Born: August 24, 1824; Doon, Ontario
- Died: September 5, 1898 (aged 74); Berlin, Ontario
- Political party: Ontario Liberal Party

Moses Springer (August 24, 1824 – September 5, 1898) was an Ontario businessman and political figure who became the first mayor of Waterloo, Ontario. He also represented Waterloo North in the Legislative Assembly of Ontario as a Liberal member from 1867 to 1881.

Springer was born August 24, 1824, to Benjamin Springer, originally from Poughkeepsie, and Mary Rykeman, in Doon in Upper Canada. One of 11 children, he was orphaned at the age of 10 when both parents died in 1834 during a cholera epidemic. He was later adopted and raised by Mennonite bishop Joseph B. Hagey. He worked as a farm hand, taught school and served as a provincial land surveyor in Woolwich Township.

In 1854, he moved to Waterloo where he became the owner and publisher of the German language newspaper Der Canadische Bauernfreund. He opened a store there in 1856. He was the president of the Waterloo Mutual Fire Insurance Company and helped found the Ontario Mutual Life Assurance Company, later Clarica Life Assurance, in 1868. He was the first reeve of the village of Waterloo and served as reeve for a total of 12 years, served 11 years on the county council and became the first mayor when Waterloo was incorporated as a town in 1876. In 1881, Springer became sheriff for Waterloo County and served in that post until his death. Springer died September 5, 1898, in Berlin, Ontario (now Kitchener) and was buried at Mount Hope Cemetery.

His wife Barbara Shantz, with whom he had 13 children, preceded him in death, dying October 1884. The home where the Springer family lived from the mid-1850s to later in his life at 34 Erb Street East was demolished by the city of Waterloo in 2016. His grand-daughter, Emma Ella Roos, was the first librarian at the Waterloo Public Library.

== Electoral history ==
1867 Ontario general election: Waterloo North
| Party | Candidate | Votes | % |
|---|---|---|---|
| Liberal | Moses Springer | 908 | 50.67 |
| Conservative | Mr. Zoeger | 884 | 49.33 |
| Total valid votes | | 1,792 | 71.68 |
| Eligible voters | | 2,500 | |
| Liberal pickup new district. | | | |
Source: Elections Ontario

1871 Ontario general election: Waterloo North
| Party | Candidate | Votes |
|---|---|---|
| Liberal | Moses Springer | Acclaimed |
Source: Elections Ontario

1875 Ontario general election: Waterloo North
| Party | Candidate | Votes | % |
|---|---|---|---|
| Liberal | Moses Springer | 1,363 | 67.71 |
| Conservative | A. Millar | 650 | 32.29 |
| Total valid votes | | 2,013 | 70.31 |
| Eligible voters | | 2,863 | |
| Liberal hold | | | |
Source: Elections Ontario
