= Simon Snyder (Canadian politician) =

Canadian politician and business owner

Simon Snyder (March 31, 1846 – 1902) was a business owner and politician in Ontario, Canada. He served as mayor of Waterloo from 1895 to 1897.

Born in Bloomingdale, Canada West, he began work as a store clerk in Conestogo. Snyder studied at a business college in Toronto and then apprenticed with a Waterloo druggist, later buying the drug store with partner Moses Springer in 1868. In 1873, he became sole owner. In 1889, he was one of the funding directors of the Dominion Life Assurance Company. Around 1889, Snyder purchased a furniture business in partnership with Henry Roos. They also acquired the Schaefer-Killer Furniture Company and then, in 1900, amalgamated both stores with Canada Furniture Manufacturers Limited. In 1902, Snyder became president of that company.

He served on Waterloo council from 1876 to 1879, from 1888 to 1890 and in 1899.

The building which housed Snyder's drug store has been designated a heritage building by the city of Waterloo.
