= George N. Moore =

American photographer (b. 1844)

- Born: c. 1844; Massachusetts, U.S.
- Occupation: Photographer

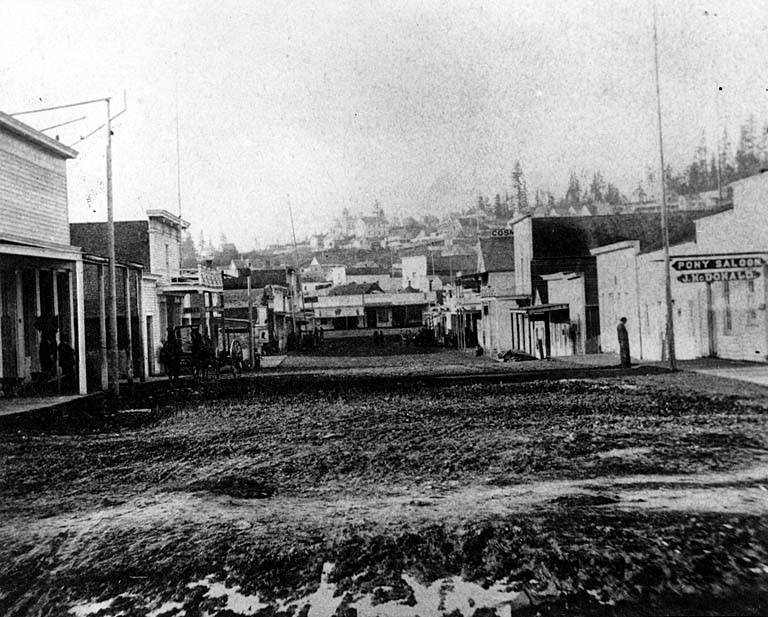
View north on 1st Avenue in Seattle from the New England Hotel, 1874

George N. Moore (born ca. 1844) was an early photographer in the Pacific Northwest of the United States. The University of Washington libraries have 35 of his prints in their collection.

Moore was born in Massachusetts ca. 1844.

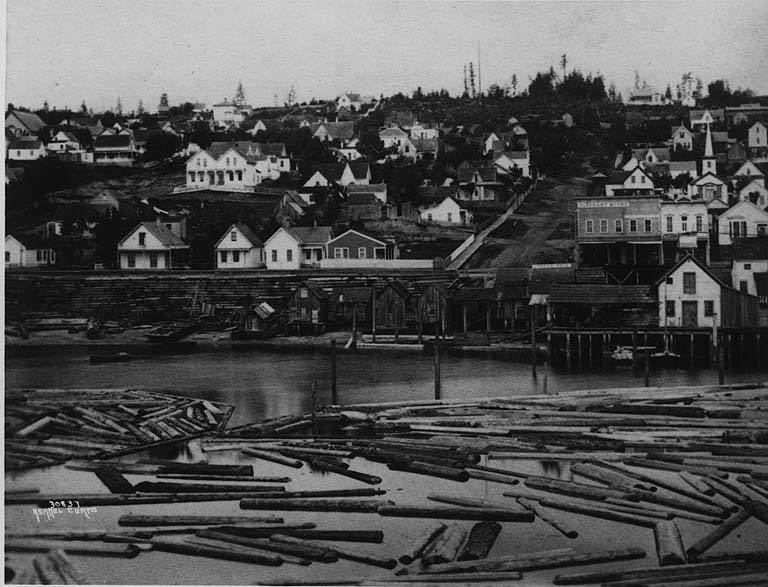
Moore's photo of the Seattle waterfront ca 1878

Moore opened a studio in Seattle in 1870 specializing in portraits and offered colored tinting with crayons and water colors. He produced carte de visite and cabinet photographs. Thomas Prosch collected photos by Moore and other local photographers.

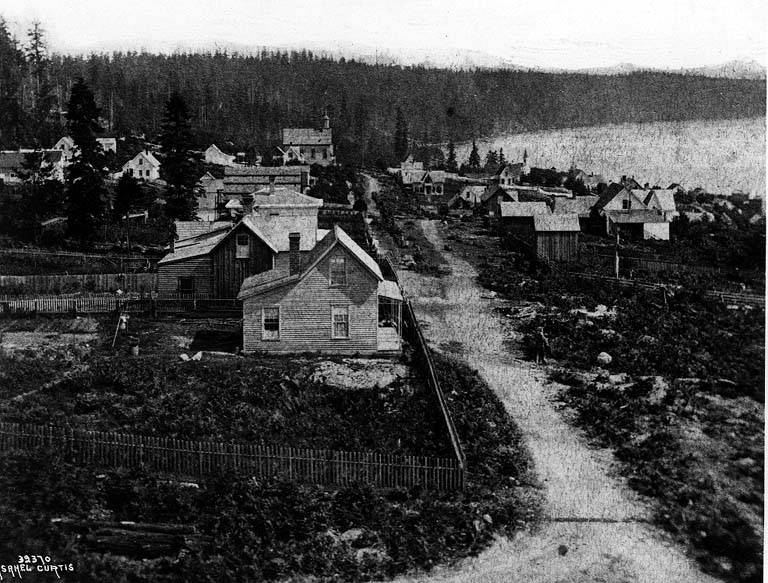
Photograph of 4th Street from the roof of the University of Washington building, ca. 1874

He photographed several community leaders from the "pioneer days" of Seattle including Seattle Post-Intelligencer publisher Charles Prosch, Judge Thomas Burke, and Father Prefontaine. He also photographed Pat Kanim (a "Puget Sound Indian" who was Snoqualmie chief) and Erasmus M. Smithers. He also photographed Roger Sherman Greene.
