= Christian Kumpf =

German-born politician

Christian Kumpf (22 August 1838 – 9 January 1905) was a German-born politician in Ontario, Canada. He served as mayor of Waterloo from 1879 to 1880 and from 1888 to 1889.

He was born in Beerfelden, Hesse. He immigrated to Canada in 1846. By 1852, he was living in Preston. Kumpf worked for Daniel Snyder in his store and post office, eventually becoming assistant postmaster. He was working as a printer by around 1855. In 1860, with John Bowman, he purchased the Berlin Chronicle and Provincial Reformers' Gazette, renaming it the Waterloo County Chronicle. On Snyder's retirement, Kumpf became postmaster in 1862. He purchased the Erb-Kumpf House from Elias Snider in 1869. In 1885, he became the local agent for the Bell Telephone Company and, in 1889, helped establish the Dominion Life Assurance Company and served as one its first vice-presidents. Kumpf was first president of the Waterloo Board of Trade, first chair of the Board of Park Management and a member of the first board for the Berlin-Waterloo Hospital.
