= Stanley Moore (cricketer) =

Australian cricketer

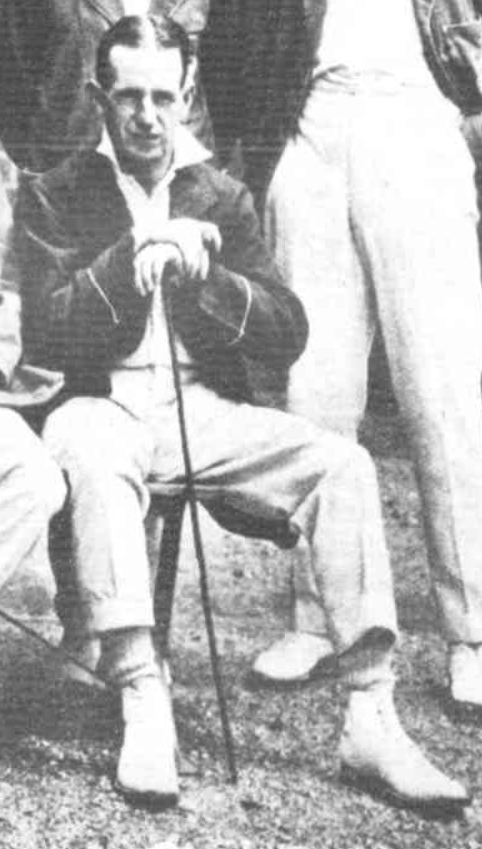

Personal information
- Full name: George Stanley Moore
- Born: 18 April 1886; Sydney, Australia
- Died: 22 March 1948 (aged 61); Bundaberg, Queensland, Australia
- Source: ESPNcricinfo, 9 January 2017

Stanley Moore (18 April 1886 – 22 March 1948) was an Australian cricketer. He played eight first-class matches for New South Wales and Queensland between 1912/13 and 1920/21.

== See also ==
- List of New South Wales representative cricketers
