= Dorothy McCabe =

Canadian politician (born c. 1969)

Mayor of Waterloo
- In office November 15, 2022 – November 15. 2026
- Preceded by: Dave Jaworsky
- Succeeded by: Shannon Weber

Personal details
- Born: c. 1969 (age 56–57) Arthur, Ontario, Canada
- Party: Independent
- Other political affiliations: Ontario Liberal
- Spouse: Janek Jagiellowicz
- Children: 2
- Occupation: Politician; government relations specialist

Dorothy McCabe (born c. 1969) is a Canadian politician. She served as mayor of Waterloo from 2022 to 2026. As mayor, she also served on Waterloo Regional Council.

== Early life ==
McCabe is originally from Arthur, Ontario. She is the daughter of Terry McCabe and Stella Mulhall.

McCabe attended Wilfrid Laurier University where she received a bachelor's degree in Communications and History. While attending Laurier, she was a member of the Laurier Golden Hawks varsity women's basketball team.

In 2015, she received a master's degree in public administration from the University of Western Ontario.

== Early career ==
She worked in the office of Liberal MPP John Milloy from 2003 to 2010, served as chief of staff to mayor of Kitchener Carl Zehr from 2010 to 2015, and in the office of Liberal MPP Daiene Vernile in 2016. As Zehr's chief of staff, she worked on trying to bring two-way all-day GO Trains to the region. She worked as a senior executive for KidsAbility from 2016 to 2019.

In 2018, McCabe ran as the Liberal candidate in that year's provincial election in the riding of Waterloo. She finished in third place, winning 12 per cent of the vote. The NDP's Catherine Fife won the seat.

Beginning in 2021, McCabe worked for the City of Milton, and worked as a professor at Conestoga College from 2020.

== Mayoralty ==
Following the announcement that Dave Jaworsky would not be running for re-election as mayor of Waterloo McCabe announced she would be running for mayor of the city in the 2022 mayoral election. In her announcement, she cited her past experience in working in governance at the municipal and provincial levels, as well as her position at KidsAbility.

In the election, McCabe narrowly defeated community volunteer Shannon Weber by just 331 votes. Weber was married to Dan Weber, who was McCabe's Progressive Conservative opponent in the 2018 provincial election. McCabe campaigned on leading "Waterloo toward the future", "creating a greener, more sustainable city", and to "hear and understand diverse perspectives to work toward collective action". Following her election, she announced that one of her first issues she would focus on would be affordable housing.

When the provincial government passed the Strong Mayors, Building Homes Act, McCabe announced she was unlikely to use her new "strong mayor" powers.

McCabe was defeated by Shannon Weber in the 2026 mayoral election. She ran on a platform of housing, economic development and a "Waterloo for all". Her defeat was blamed on a lack of advertising compared to her opponent.

== Electoral record ==
2022 Waterloo mayoral election
Candidate	Votes	%
Dorothy McCabe	9,543	43.53%
Shannon Weber	9,212	42.02%
Rob Evans	2,474	11.28%
Kypp Saunders	694	3.17%

2018 Ontario general election: Waterloo
Party	Candidate	Votes	%
New Democratic	Catherine Fife	27,315	50.54
Progressive Conservative	Dan Weber	16,973	31.41
Liberal	Dorothy McCabe	6,577	12.17
Green	Zdravko Gunjevic	2,613	4.83
Libertarian	Andrew Allison	566	1.05
Total valid votes		54,097	100.00
Turnout			64.5
Eligible voters		83,924	
New Democratic pickup new district.			
Source: Elections Ontario
