= George W. Moore =

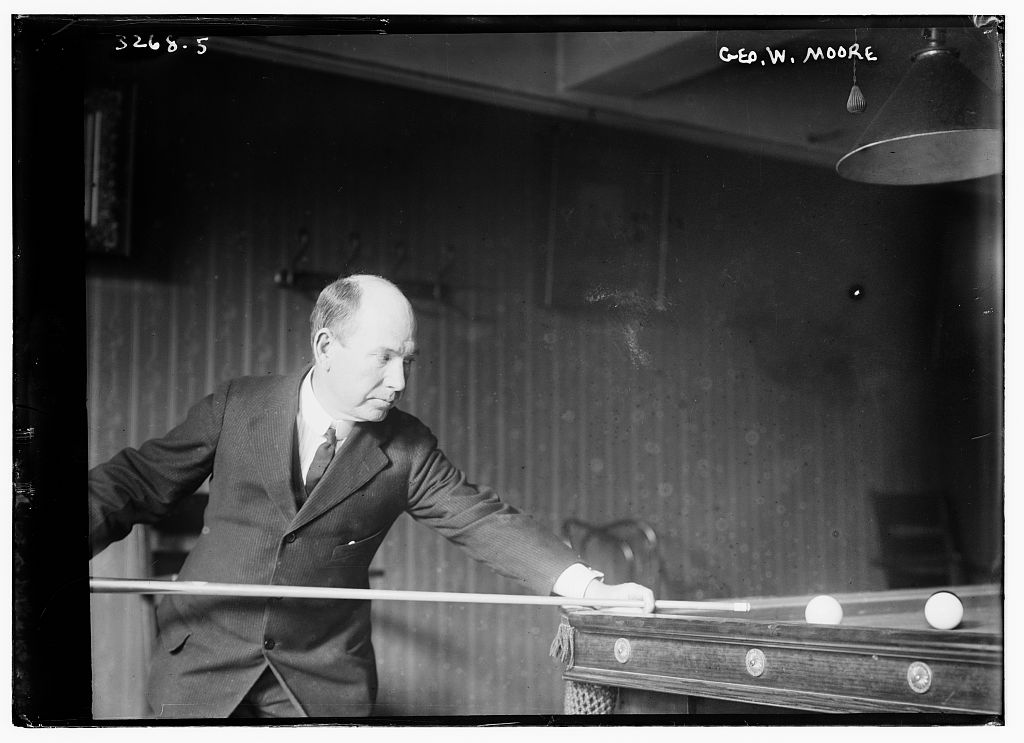

George W. Moore was a three-cushion carrom billiard champion.

In 1910 he was defeated by Tom Hueston by a single point at Doyle's Billiard Academy.

In 1915 he defeated Alfredo De Oro to win the Three-Cushion World Championship at the New York Theatre Concert Hall.

In 1916 he won the Three-Cushion World Championship, again beating Alfredo De Oro.
