= George More (footballer) =

Scottish footballer

Personal information
- Full name: George More
- Place of birth: Scotland
- Position: Right back

Youth career
- Edinburgh University

Senior career*
Years	Team	Apps	(Gls)
1948–1953	Queen's Park	43	(0)

International career
1949–1951	Scotland Amateurs	3	(0)
- * Club domestic league appearances and goals

George More was a Scottish amateur footballer who played as a right back in the Scottish League for Queen's Park. He was capped by Scotland at amateur level.
