= George Moore (businessman) =

New Zealand Salvation Army officer and businessman

- Born: 23 April 1871; Brunnerton, West Coast, New Zealand
- Died: 20 June 1947 (aged 76)
- Occupations: Salvation Army officer, businessman
- Known for: Service in the Salvation Army and business activities in New Zealand

George Moore (23 April 1871 – 20 June 1947) was a New Zealand Salvation Army officer and businessman. He was born in Brunnerton, West Coast, New Zealand on 23 April 1871.
