= William Snider =

William Snider (October 26, 1845 – March 1915) was a businessman and politician. He served as mayor of Waterloo from 1885 to 1886 and from 1891 to 1892.

The son of Elias Snider and Hannah Bingeman, he was born in Waterloo and was educated locally. Snider was first elected to Waterloo council in 1873, serving for six years. Snider also served as county warden. He purchased his father's grist mill in 1879. He was president of the Waterloo Mutual Fire Insurance Company, a director for the Mutual Life Assurance Company (later Sun Life) and vice-president of the Waterloo Manufacturing Company. Snider was also a member of the local Board of Trade and of the Waterloo Board of Park Management. He also held an interest in a sawmill at Rousseau Falls in the Muskoka region.

In 1867, he married Lydia Ann Bowman.

He died at home in Waterloo after being ill for several months.

His brother Elias Weber Bingeman Snider was a member of the Ontario assembly and one of the founders of the Ontario Power Commission, later Ontario Hydro.
