= Wilfred Hilliard =

Canadian actuary and politician

Wilfred L Hilliard (1896 – 1965) was a Canadian actuary and politician in Ontario. He served as mayor of Waterloo from 1947 to 1948.

He was the son of Doctor William L. Hilliard, an earlier mayor, and the grandson of Thomas Hilliard, founder of the Dominion Life Assurance Company (later Manulife Financial). He served overseas during World War I and, on his return, worked for Dominion Life Assurance for 40 years. He was a member of the provincial championship lawn bowling team in 1950.

Hilliard served on Waterloo council from 1933 to 1934 and from 1943 to 1946. During his term as mayor, the Waterloo Memorial Arena was opened and Waterloo achieved city status. He was reelected to serve as the city's first mayor in 1948.
