= Kitchener—Waterloo (provincial electoral district) =

Coordinates: 43.48°N 80.52°W

Ontario electoral district
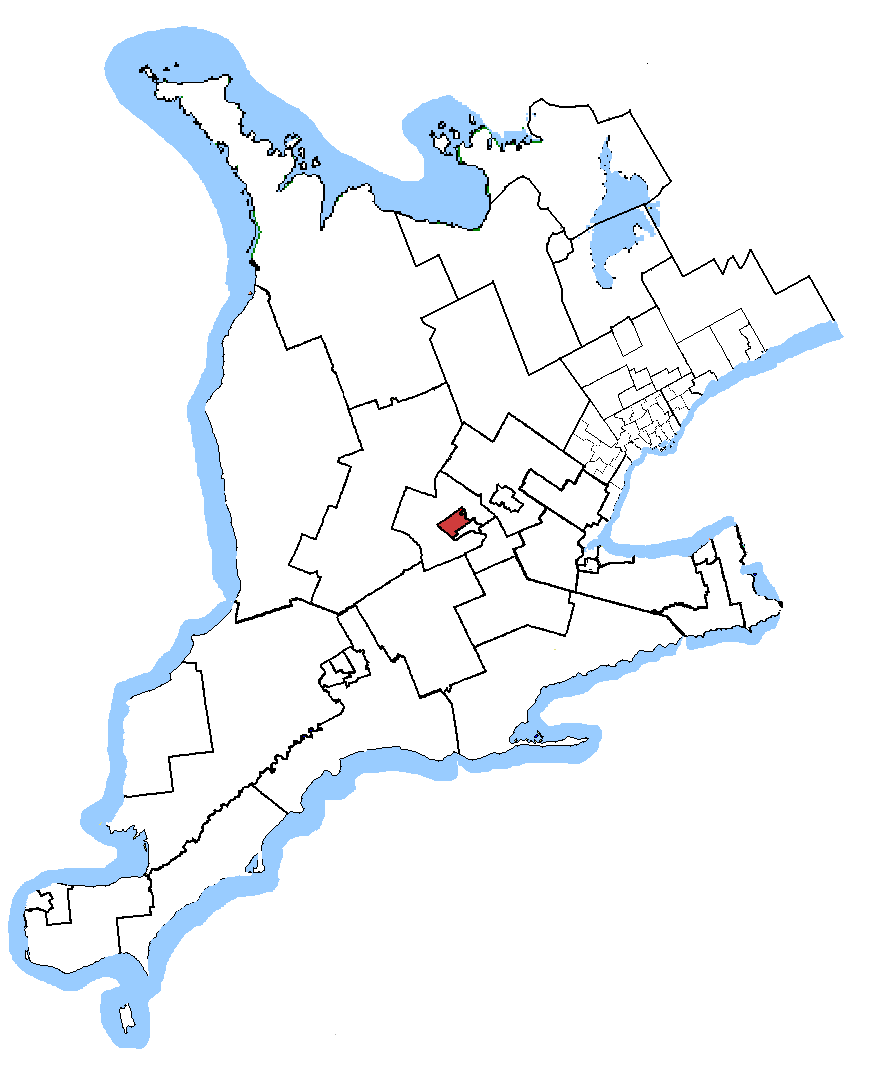
- Kitchener—Waterloo in relation to southern Ontario ridings

Defunct provincial electoral district
- Legislature: Legislative Assembly of Ontario
- District created: 1996
- District abolished: 2015
- First contested: 1999
- Last contested: 2014

Demographics
- Population (2006): 126,742
- Electors (2007): 92,313
- Area (km²): 91
- Census division: Waterloo
- Census subdivision(s): Waterloo, Kitchener

Kitchener—Waterloo was a provincial electoral district in Ontario, Canada, that was represented in the Legislative Assembly of Ontario from 1999 to 2018. Its population in 2006 was 126,742. The riding was created in 1996 from parts of Waterloo North, Kitchener—Wilmot and Kitchener.

== Geography ==
The district consists of the City of Waterloo and the northern part of the City of Kitchener.

The electoral district was created as part of the 1996 redistribution of provincial ridings to have the same borders as federal ridings, and first contested in 1999 general election.

It consisted initially of the City of Waterloo and the part of the City of Kitchener lying north of a line drawn from west to east along Highland Road West, Lawrence Avenue and Victoria Street.

In 2003, the Kitchener part of the riding was redefined to be the part of the city lying north of a line drawn from west to east along Highland Road West, Fischer Hallman Road and the Canadian National Railway situated north of Shadeland Crescent.

For the 2018 general election, the riding was dissolved into Waterloo, Kitchener Centre, and Kitchener—Conestoga.

=== Member of Provincial Parliament ===
This riding has elected the following members of the Legislative Assembly of Ontario:

Kitchener—Waterloo
Assembly	Years	Member	Party
Riding created from Waterloo North, Kitchener—Wilmot and Kitchener
37th	1999–2003	Elizabeth Witmer	Progressive Conservative
38th	2003–2007	Elizabeth Witmer	Progressive Conservative
39th	2007–2011	Elizabeth Witmer	Progressive Conservative
40th	2011–2012	Elizabeth Witmer	Progressive Conservative
40th	2012–2014	Catherine Fife	New Democratic
41st	2014–2018	Catherine Fife	New Democratic
Riding dissolved into Waterloo, Kitchener Centre, and Kitchener—Conestoga

== Election results ==
2014 Ontario general election
Party	Candidate	Votes	%	±%
New Democratic	Catherine Fife	20,536	37.43	–2.43
Liberal	Jamie Burton	16,534	30.14	+6.14
Progressive Conservative	Tracey Weiler	14,450	26.34	–5.49
Green	Stacey Danckert	2,859	5.21	+1.94
Libertarian	James Schulz	481	0.88	+0.54
Total valid votes		54,860	98.88	
Total rejected, unmarked and declined ballots		623	1.12	+0.85
Turnout		55,483	54.95	+7.95
Eligible voters		100,972		
New Democratic hold		Swing		–4.29
Source: Elections Ontario

Ontario provincial by-election, September 6, 2012 Resignation of Elizabeth Witmer
Party	Candidate	Votes	%	±%
New Democratic	Catherine Fife	18,599	39.87	+23.20
Progressive Conservative	Tracey Weiler	14,851	31.83	–11.94
Liberal	Eric Davis	11,194	23.99	–12.04
Green	Stacey Danckert	1,525	3.27	+0.63
Libertarian	Allan Dettweiler	156	0.33	–
Freedom	David Driver	95	0.20	–0.04
Communist	Elizabeth Rowley	85	0.18	–
Independent	Garnet Bruce	77	0.17	–
People's Political Party	Kevin Clarke	48	0.10	–
Pauper	John Turmel	23	0.05	–
Total valid votes		46,653	99.73	
Total rejected, unmarked and declined ballots		128	0.27	–0.06
Turnout		46,781	47.00	–3.55
Eligible voters		99,544		
New Democratic gain from Progressive Conservative		Swing		+17.62
Source: Elections Ontario

2011 Ontario general election
Party	Candidate	Votes	%	±%
Progressive Conservative	Elizabeth Witmer	21,665	43.77	+2.93
Liberal	Eric Davis	17,837	36.04	+4.84
New Democratic	Isabel Cisterna	8,250	16.67	–0.86
Green	J. D. McGuire	1,308	2.64	–6.62
Independent	Peter Davis	316	0.64	–
Freedom	Melanie Motz	123	0.25	–
Total valid votes		49,499	99.66	
Total rejected, unmarked and declined ballots		168	0.34	–0.27
Turnout		49,667	50.54	–3.08
Eligible voters		98,268		
Progressive Conservative hold		Swing		–0.96
Source: Elections Ontario

2007 Ontario general election
Party	Candidate	Votes	%	±%
Progressive Conservative	Elizabeth Witmer	20,748	40.84	–2.24
Liberal	Louise Ervin	15,848	31.20	–9.18
New Democratic	Catherine Fife	8,902	17.52	+6.58
Green	Judy Greenwood-Speers	4,707	9.27	+6.08
Family Coalition	Louis Reitzel	598	1.18	–0.53
Total valid votes		50,803	99.39	
Total rejected, unmarked and declined ballots		313	0.61	+0.05
Turnout		51,116	53.63	–5.44
Eligible voters		95,319		
Progressive Conservative hold		Swing		+3.47
Source: Elections Ontario

2003 Ontario general election
Party	Candidate	Votes	%	±%
Progressive Conservative	Elizabeth Witmer	23,957	43.08	–11.28
Liberal	Sean Strickland	22,456	40.38	+5.15
New Democratic	Dan Lajoie	6,084	10.94	+4.84
Green	Pauline Richards	1,774	3.19	+1.56
Family Coalition	Louis Reitzel	949	1.71	–0.09
Independent	Owen Alastair Ferguson	242	0.44	–
Independent	Julian Ichim	153	0.28	–
Total valid votes		55,615	99.44	
Total rejected, unmarked and declined ballots		312	0.56	–0.19
Turnout		55,927	59.06	+4.68
Eligible voters		94,691		
Progressive Conservative hold		Swing		–8.22
Source: Elections Ontario

1999 Ontario general election
Party	Candidate	Votes	%
Progressive Conservative	Elizabeth Witmer	27,830	54.36
Liberal	Sean Strickland	18,034	35.22
New Democratic	Ted Martin	3,122	6.10
Family Coalition	Louis Reitzel	919	1.79
Green	Judy Greenwood-Speers	836	1.63
Independent	Matthew Albrecht	202	0.39
Natural Law	Richard Beecroft	135	0.26
Independent	Helmut Braun	122	0.24
Total valid votes		51,200	99.26
Total rejected, unmarked and declined ballots		384	0.74
Turnout		51,584	54.39
Eligible voters		94,846	
Progressive Conservative pickup new district.			
Source: Elections Ontario

== 2007 electoral reform referendum ==
2007 Ontario electoral reform referendum
Side	Votes	%
First Past the Post	28,641	57.1
Mixed member proportional	21,516	42.9
Total valid votes	50,157	100.0

== Sources ==
- Elections Ontario Past Election Results
