= Albert Heer =

Canadian politician (1891–1972)

Albert R. Heer (January 28, 1891 – 1972) was a building contractor and politician in Ontario, Canada. He served as mayor of Waterloo from 1944 to 1946.

Heer was born in Petersburg, Ontario and was educated in Woolwich and in Waterloo. He first worked as a carpenter and set up a contracting business when he moved to Waterloo. Heer served in the army during World War I. He was a member of Waterloo council from 1931 to 1938, ran unsuccessfully for mayor in 1939 and then served on Waterloo council from 1941 to 1943 and again from 1949 to 1950. When he was elected mayor, Heer sold his business to focus on his job as mayor.

During his time on council, Heer strongly opposed the introduction of Daylight Saving Time.
