= George Moore (Canadian politician) =

Canadian politician and business owner

George Moore (July 26, 1845 – 1916) was a business owner and mayor in Ontario, Canada. He served as mayor of Waterloo in 1884 and in 1890.

He was born in Preston. His father owned the Preston Hop yards; Moore moved to Waterloo around 1875 and entered the hop business there. He also owned the Berlin Robe and Clothing Company, the Waterloo Woollen Manufacturing Company, the Waterloo Brick Yards and the Waterloo Gas Company. Moore also operated a wholesale produce business in Montreal. Moore won first prize at the 1893 World's Fair in Chicago for his team of draught horses.

He helped establish the Waterloo Board of Trade and served as a member for 18 years; he also served one year as president. He served on Waterloo council from 1876 to 1883 and again from 1887 to 1889. He ran unsuccessfully for the Waterloo North seat in the Ontario assembly as a Liberal in 1905.

In 1911, Moore moved to Galt, where he later died.
