= William L. Hilliard =

Canadian physician and politician

William Louis Hilliard (January 18, 1868 – August 14, 1966) was a Canadian physician and politician. He served as mayor of Waterloo, Ontario from 1916 to 1917.

He was born in Glen Allan, Ontario, where his father Thomas Hilliard was a newspaper owner. He studied medicine at the University of Toronto and moved to Waterloo with his family, setting up practice there in 1897. Hilliard was medical director for Equitable Life Assurance Company and was also a director of the Dominion Life Assurance Company, later Manulife Financial. After serving as mayor, he returned to the practice of medicine, retiring in 1948. Hilliard was the town's medical officer from 1940 to 1946.

Hilliard was a member of an advisory committee on town planning formed in 1914 and was one of the leading advocates for planning at the time. He was one of only two mayors who had no previous service on Waterloo council but was elected by acclamation.

During Hilliard's time as mayor, the town created an insurance plan for local recruits serving during World War I, turned down amalgamation with adjacent Berlin (later Kitchener) and made improvements to the Berlin and Waterloo Street Railway. He served on the Sewer and Water and Light Commissions and was chair of the Town Commission starting in 1921.

His son Wilfred also served as Waterloo mayor.
