= George Randall (politician) =

American-born business owner and politician

George Randall (April 16, 1832 – December 23, 1908) was an American-born business owner and politician in Ontario, Canada. He served as reeve of Waterloo from 1870 to 1872 and as mayor in 1878.

He was born in Chesterfield, New Hampshire and came to Canada in 1854, working on construction contracts for the Grand Trunk Railway. With William Hespeler, he established the Granite Mills in 1857. Surplus grain from the mill was used to manufacture whiskey. Joseph E. Seagram joined the company in 1870 and, by 1883, had become sole owner of the business, which eventually became the Seagram's distillery.

In 1863, Randall purchased a sawmill in Hespeler and built a woollen mill there. In 1884, he and William Roos (1842-1922) established Randall and Roos Wholesale Groceries and Liquours, a wholesale grocery and liquor business in downtown Berlin (at 9 Queen Street North and 66 Queen Street South both later Kitchener).

He married Caroline Roos (1834-1913), sister of partner William Roos, and the couple had four children (Clara, Emma, George Jr, Albert).

Randall was a director of the Waterloo Mutual Fire Insurance Company, and served 18 years as its president. He also served as first president of the Berlin-Waterloo Hospital Board and served on the first local Board of Health, formed in 1866.

The site of his former home became the office of the Mutual Life Insurance Company, now Sun Life.
