= 2022 Ontario general election =

Canadian provincial election

- June 2, 2022

124 seats of the Legislative Assembly of Ontario 63 seats needed for a majority
- Opinion polls
- Turnout: 44.06% (▼12.61pp)
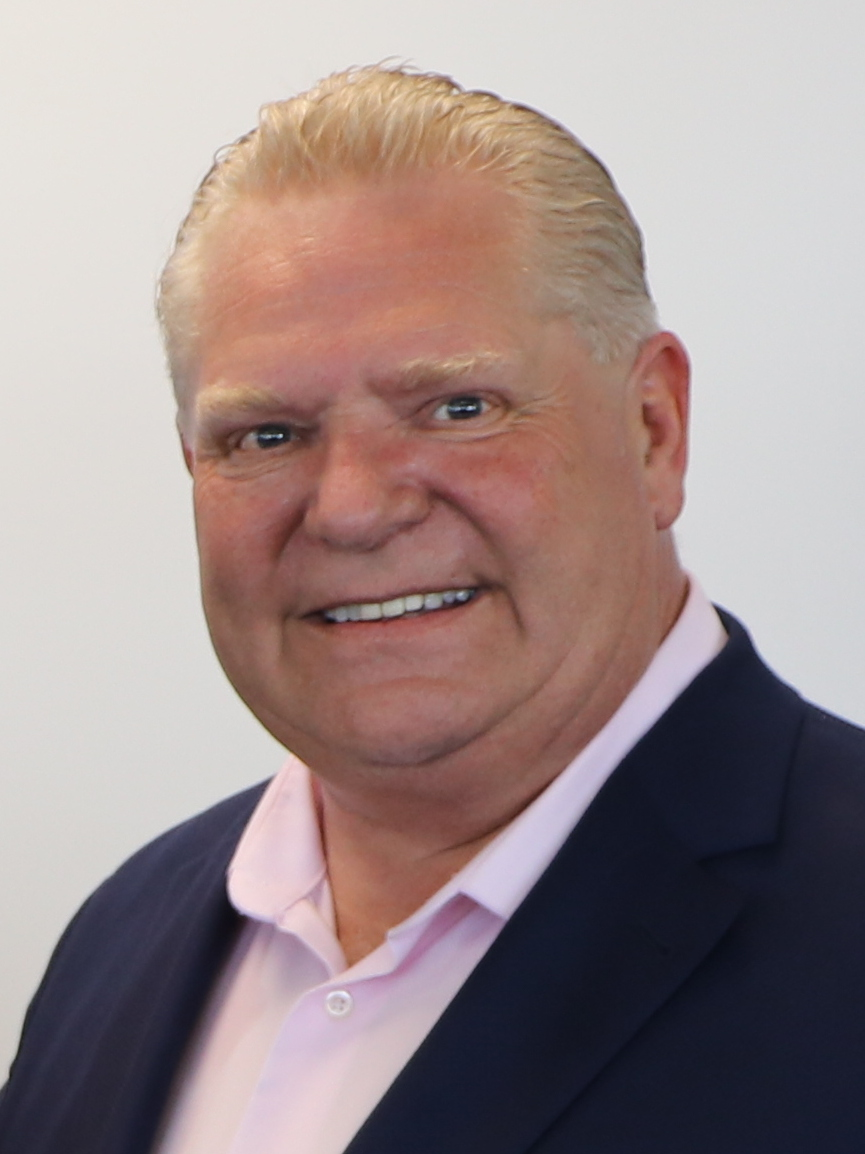

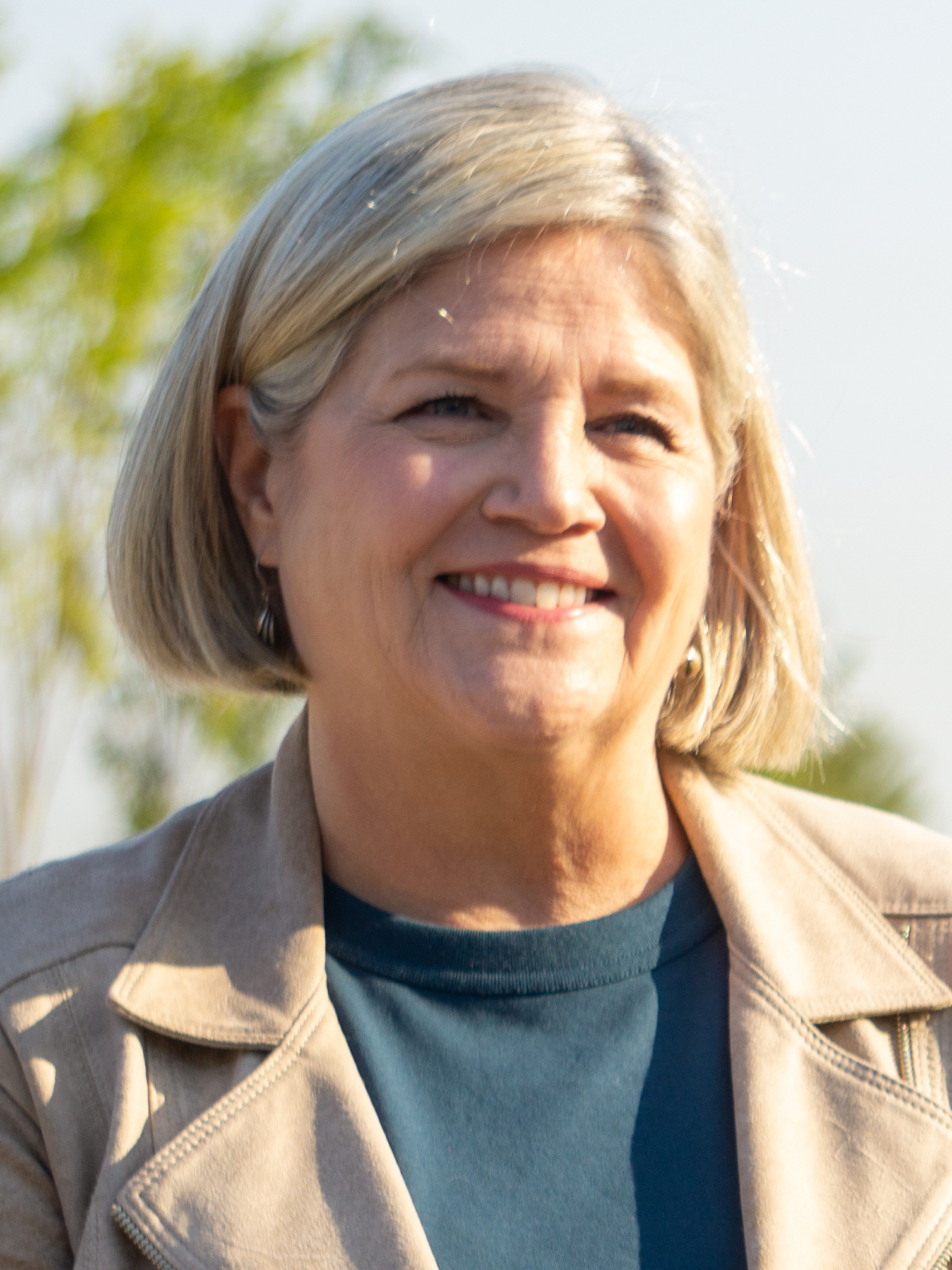

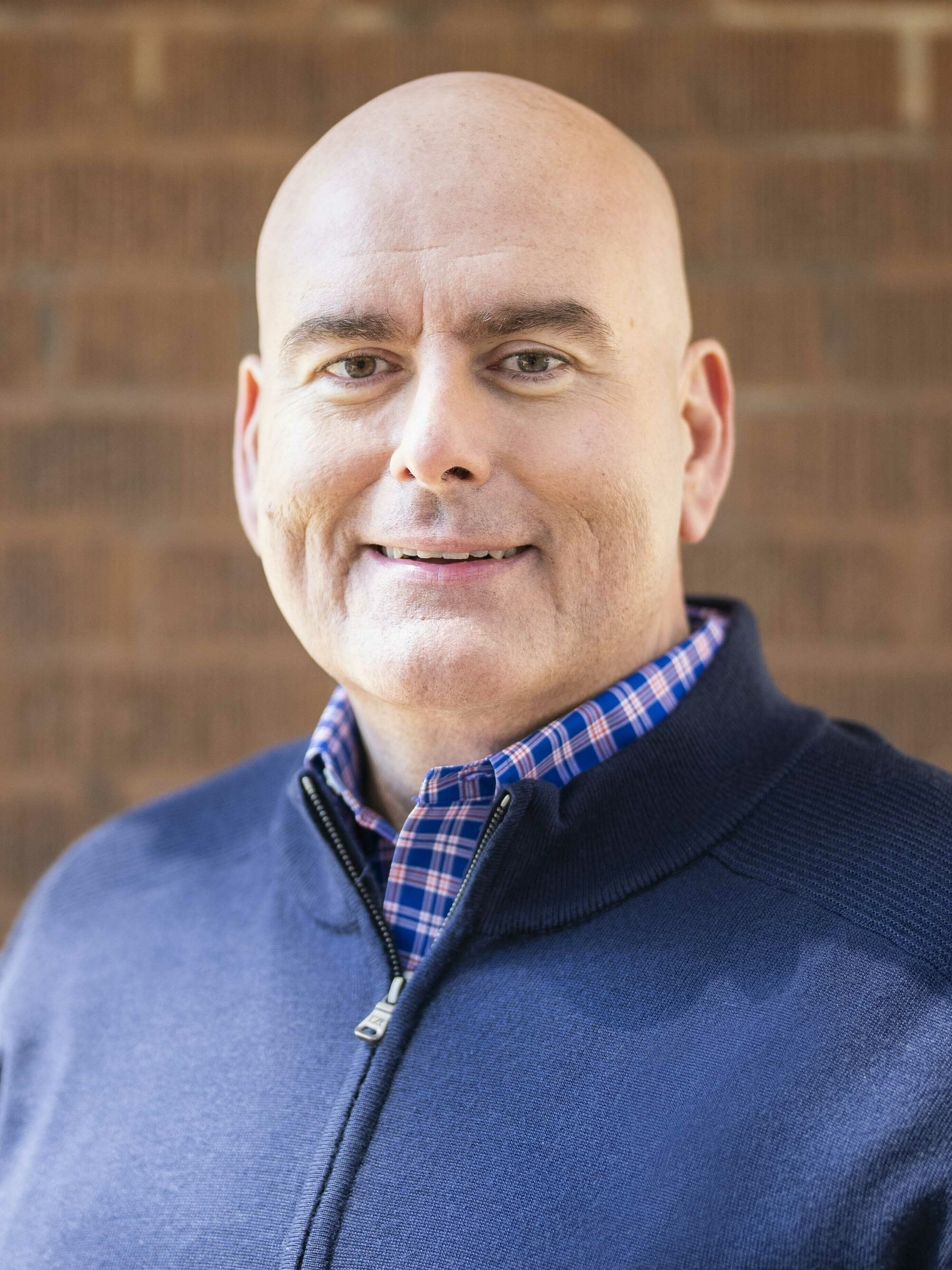

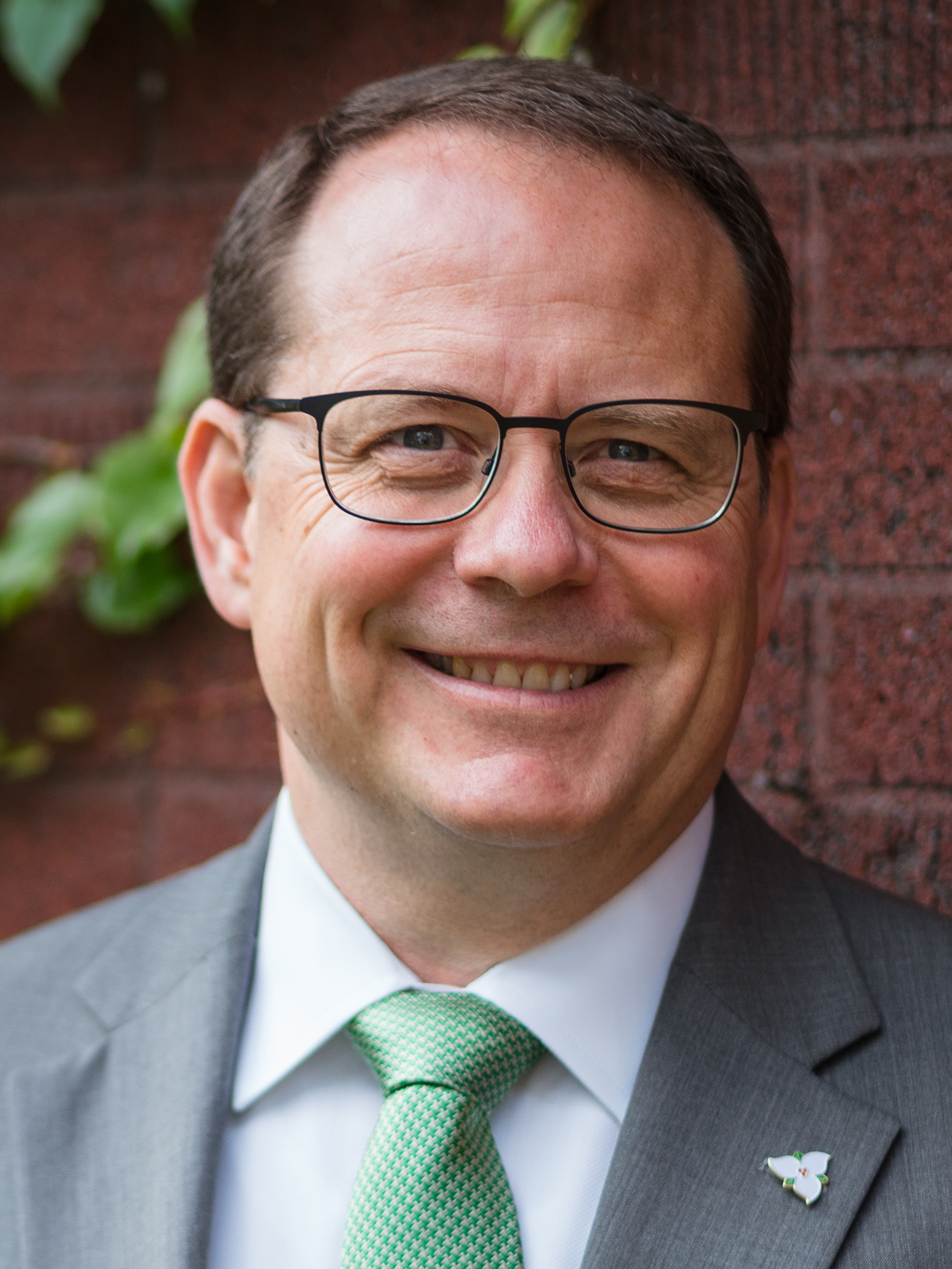
	First party	Second party
Leader	Doug Ford	Andrea Horwath
Party	Progressive Conservative	New Democratic
Leader since	March 10, 2018	March 7, 2009
Leader's seat	Etobicoke North	Hamilton Centre
Last election	76 seats, 40.50%	40 seats, 33.59%
Seats before	67	38
Seats won	83	31
Seat change	▲16	▼7
Popular vote	1,919,905	1,116,383
Percentage	40.83%	23.74%
Swing	▲0.33pp	▼9.85pp
	Third party	Fourth party
Leader	Steven Del Duca	Mike Schreiner
Party	Liberal	Green
Leader since	March 7, 2020	May 16, 2009
Leader's seat	Ran in Vaughan—Woodbridge (lost)	Guelph
Last election	7 seats, 19.59%	1 seats, 4.60%
Seats before	7	1
Seats won	8	1
Seat change	▲1	Steady
Popular vote	1,124,065	280,006
Percentage	23.91%	5.96%
Swing	▲4.32pp	▲1.36pp
- Popular vote by riding. As this is an FPTP election, seat totals are not determined by popular vote, but instead by the result in each riding. Riding names are listed at the bottom.
Premier before election
Doug Ford
Progressive Conservative
Premier after election
Doug Ford
Progressive Conservative

General elections were held on June 2, 2022, to elect Members of the Provincial Parliament to serve in the 43rd Parliament of Ontario.

The governing Progressive Conservatives, led by Premier Doug Ford, were re-elected to a second majority government, winning 7 more seats than they had won in 2018. The NDP retained their status as the Official Opposition, despite losing seats and finishing third in the popular vote, while the Ontario Liberals finished 2nd in the popular vote, but only won 8 seats, a gain of one seat from 2018 but falling short of official party status. The Green Party retained the single seat they won in 2018 while the New Blue and Ontario Party failed to win a seat, both losing their lone sitting MPPs.

A total of 4,701,959 valid votes were cast in this election, as well as a smaller number of invalid ballots. The election set a record for the lowest voter turnout in an Ontario provincial election, as only 44.06% of the people who were eligible voted. This broke the previous record for low turnout of 48.2% in the 2011 election.

== Background ==
As of December 2016, Ontario elections are held on or before the first Thursday in June in the fourth calendar year following the previous general election.

In the June 2018 Ontario general election, the Progressive Conservative Party (PC Party) led by Doug Ford won a strong majority government. The New Democratic Party (NDP) led by Andrea Horwath became the Official Opposition; this was the first time since 1990 they surpassed their third-place status. The governing Liberal Party led by Premier Kathleen Wynne was decimated, winning only 7 out of the 124 seats in the legislature and being reduced to third-place status. The Green Party won its first seat in history, with leader Mike Schreiner becoming its first Member of Provincial Parliament (MPP).

Wynne resigned as leader immediately after the 2018 election and MPP John Fraser succeeded her as interim leader; he held that post until March 2020, when Wynne's former minister of transportation, Steven Del Duca, became permanent leader of the Liberal Party. Meanwhile, Horwath and Schreiner both remained leader of their parties and had no intention of resigning.

By December 2019, polling showed that the Ford government was as unpopular as the previous Wynne government. However, the Progressive Conservatives experienced a surge of support during the early months of the COVID-19 pandemic; a Mainstreet Research poll in June 2020 showed the PCs at 42 per cent, the Liberals at 28 per cent, and the NDP at 23 per cent.

On October 5, 2020, Ontario MPPs voted unanimously in favour of a motion stating that the government will not call an election prior to the fixed election date in 2022. Before this vote, the Legislative Assembly of Ontario could have been dissolved earlier by the Lieutenant Governor of Ontario on a motion of no confidence or if the Premier triggered a snap election (the former was extremely unlikely to work against the incumbent government with a majority).

In April 2021, the province experienced a major third wave of COVID-19 infections, and, after quickly reversing government health policies, such as opening and then abruptly closing restaurants, the government was criticized over their handling of COVID-19. This led to the PCs' support dipping, but remaining ahead of the Liberals and NDP.

In late April 2022 – days before the election call – the Ford government released its budget, promising to implement it if the government was reelected. The budget recorded a deficit of $19.9 billion and promised substantial spending on infrastructure (including for their proposed Highway 413) and tax breaks for some workers and seniors.

On May 3, 2022, Premier Doug Ford met with the Lieutenant Governor of Ontario to advise dissolution of the legislature and for writs of election be drawn up.

== Timeline ==
42nd Legislative Assembly of Ontario - Movement in seats held up to the election (2018-2022)
Party	2018	Gain/(loss) due to					2022
Party	2018	Resignation from caucus	Resignation as MPP	Expulsion	Switching allegiance	Byelection hold	2022
Progressive Conservative	76	(2)	(2)	(2)	(3)		67
New Democratic	40	(1)		(1)			38
Liberal	7		(3)		1	2	7
Green	1						1
New Blue	N/A				1		1
Ontario Party	0				1		1
Independent	0	3		3			6
Vacant	0		3				3
Total	124	–	(2)	–	–	2	124

Changes in seats held (2018–2022)
Seat	Before				Change		
Seat	Date	Member	Party	Reason	Date	Member	Party
Simcoe—Grey	November 2, 2018	Jim Wilson	█ PC	Resignation (Note: from cabinet and caucus due to allegations of sexual misconduct)			█ Independent
Glengarry—Prescott—Russell	November 29, 2018	Amanda Simard	█ PC	Resignation (Note: from caucus after opposing the government's cuts to francophone services)			█ Independent
Glengarry—Prescott—Russell	January 16, 2020	Amanda Simard	█ Independent	Joined caucus			█ Liberal
Lanark—Frontenac—Kingston	February 20, 2019	Randy Hillier	█ PC	Suspended (Note: later removed after alleged autism comment, and alleged lack of commitment to the caucus)			█ Independent
Ottawa—Vanier	July 31, 2019	Nathalie Des Rosiers	█ Liberal	Resignation (Note: accepted position at Massey College of the University of Toronto)	February 27, 2020	Lucille Collard	█ Liberal
Orléans	September 20, 2019	Marie-France Lalonde	█ Liberal	Resignation (Note: to run in the 2019 Canadian federal election for its equivalent seat)	February 27, 2020	Stephen Blais	█ Liberal
Cambridge	July 21, 2020	Belinda Karahalios	█ PC	Expelled (Note: from caucus after voting against Bill 195)			█ Independent
Cambridge	January 18, 2021	Belinda Karahalios	█ Independent	Joined caucus (Note: co-created (alongside her husband) the New Blue Party, and officially joined soon after)			█ New Blue
York Centre	January 15, 2021	Roman Baber	█ PC	Expelled (Note: from caucus for opposing COVID lockdown)			█ Independent
Don Valley East	August 17, 2021	Michael Coteau	█ Liberal	Resignation (Note: to run in the 2021 Canadian federal election for its equivalent seat)			█ Vacant
Chatham-Kent—Leamington	August 19, 2021	Rick Nicholls	█ PC	Expelled (Note: from caucus due to refusal to get vaccinated against COVID-19)			█ Independent
Chatham-Kent—Leamington	December 22, 2021	Rick Nicholls	█ Independent	Joined caucus			█ Ontario Party
Durham	October 22, 2021	Lindsey Park	█ PC	Resignation (Note: from caucus following party accusations that she had misrepresented her COVID-19 vaccine status.)			█ Independent
Ajax	February 2, 2022	Rod Phillips	█ PC	Resignation			█ Vacant
Elgin—Middlesex—London	February 28, 2022	Jeff Yurek	█ PC	Resignation			█ Vacant
Hamilton East—Stoney Creek	March 17, 2022	Paul Miller	█ New Democratic	Expelled (Note: from caucus during vetting process for re-election for having joined an Islamophobic Facebook group)			█ Independent
Brampton North	April 22, 2022	Kevin Yarde	█ New Democratic	Resignation (Note: from caucus after losing nomination contest to be re-elected)			█ Independent

=== 2018 ===
- June 7: The Progressive Conservative Party of Ontario (PC) under Doug Ford wins a majority government in the 42nd Ontario general election, with Andrea Horwath's New Democrats (NDP) forming the Official Opposition. After leading the party to the worst result in its history, outgoing Premier Kathleen Wynne resigns as leader of the Ontario Liberal Party, but remains MPP for Don Valley West.
- June 14: Ottawa South MPP John Fraser is named interim leader of the Ontario Liberal Party.
- June 29: Progressive Conservative leader Doug Ford is sworn in as the 26th Premier of Ontario.
- July 11: Wellington—Halton Hills MPP Ted Arnott, a Progressive Conservative, is elected Speaker by secret ballot.

=== 2020 ===
- March 7: Former Vaughan MPP and cabinet minister Steven Del Duca is elected leader of the Ontario Liberal Party.
- October 5: MPP's vote unanimously in favour of a motion introduced by Scarborough—Guildwood MPP Mitzie Hunter stating that the government will not call an election prior to the fixed election date in 2022.

=== 2021 ===
- November 8: Randy Hillier announces that he will run under the banner of the People's Party of Canada's proposed Ontario wing, the Ontario First Party. He later announced that he would not seek re-election.
- December 14: Former Member of Parliament for Hastings—Lennox and Addington, Derek Sloan, announces that he will lead the Ontario Party in the upcoming election.

=== 2022 ===
- May 3: Writs of the election were drawn up, dissolving the Legislature and officially starting the campaign.
- May 10: First leaders' debate, organized by Federation of Northern Ontario Municipalities.
- May 16: Second leaders' debate, organized by Broadcast Consortium.
- June 2: Election day.

== Campaign period ==
=== Contests ===
Candidate contests in the ridings
Candidates nominated	Ridings	Party															
Candidates nominated	Ridings	PC	NDP	Green	NB	Lib	Ont	Ind	NOTA	Mod	Ltn	Pop	Comm	Cons	Free	Oth	Totals
5	9	9	9	9	8	7	2									1	45
6	35	35	35	35	35	35	27	1	1				2			4	210
7	30	30	30	30	30	29	28	5	9	5	3	4	1		2	4	210
8	28	28	28	28	28	28	27	12	7	6	5	5	6	4	3	9	224
9	14	14	14	14	14	14	14	6	7	3	6	3	3	4	5	5	126
10	6	6	6	6	6	6	5	11	3	2	2		2	1	1	3	60
11	2	2	2	2	2	2	2	5	1	1		1				2	22
Total	124	124	124	124	123	121	105	39	28	17	16	13	12	11	11	29	897

=== Incumbents not standing for reelection ===
26 MPPs chose not to campaign in the election:

Electoral district	Incumbent at dissolution
Ajax	Rod Phillips
Beaches—East York	Rima Berns-McGown
Brampton North	Kevin Yarde (Note: Previously elected under the NDP banner)
Bruce—Grey—Owen Sound	Bill Walker
Burlington	Jane McKenna
Don Valley East	Michael Coteau
Don Valley West	Kathleen Wynne
Durham	Lindsey Park (Note: Previously elected under the PC banner)
Elgin—Middlesex—London	Jeff Yurek
Essex	Taras Natyshak
Haldimand—Norfolk	Toby Barrett
Hastings—Lennox and Addington	Daryl Kramp
Kingston and the Islands	Ian Arthur
Kitchener South—Hespeler	Amy Fee
Lanark—Frontenac—Kingston	Randy Hillier
Newmarket—Aurora	Christine Elliott
Parry Sound—Muskoka	Norm Miller
Perth—Wellington	Randy Pettapiece
Scarborough Centre	Christina Mitas
Simcoe—Grey	Jim Wilson
Stormont—Dundas—South Glengarry	Jim McDonell
Thornhill	Gila Martow
Thunder Bay—Superior North	Michael Gravelle
Toronto Centre	Suze Morrison
Windsor—Tecumseh	Percy Hatfield
York Centre	Roman Baber

=== Party slogans ===
Party	English	French (translation)
█ PC	"Get It Done."	"Passer à l'action" ("Taking Action")
█ New Democratic (NDP)	"Strong. Ready. Working for you."	"Force. Détermination. Pour vous" ("Strength. Determination. For you.")
█ Liberal	"The Choice is Yours"	"C’est votre choix" ("It's Your Choice.")
█ Green	"The Ontario You Want. The Leadership We Need."	"L'Ontario que vous voulez. La direction qu'il nous faut." (identical to English slogan)
█ New Blue	"Strength. Stability. Liberty. Good government."	N/A (unofficial translation: "La force. La stabilité. La liberté. Un bon gouvernement.")
█ Ontario Party	"Freedom, Family, & Faith"	"Liberté, Famille, et Foi" (identical to English slogan)

=== Debates ===
Date	Time (EDT)	Organiser(s)	Language	Participants			
Date	Time (EDT)	Organiser(s)	Language	PC	NDP	Lib.	Green
May 10, 2022	1:00pm – 2:30pm	Federation of Northern Ontario Municipalities	English	Present; Ford	Present; Horwath	Present; Del Duca	Present; Schreiner
May 16, 2022	6:30pm – 8:00pm	Broadcast Consortium	English	Present; Ford	Present; Horwath	Present; Del Duca	Present; Schreiner
May 17, 2022	8:00pm – 9:00pm	Radio-Canada and TFO	French	Present; Mulroney	Present; Gélinas	Present; Simard	Present; Des Granges

=== Summary ===
The 2022 Ontario Budget, entitled Ontario's Plan to Build, served as the platform of the governing PC Party. The main five themes it emphasized were: growing the clean energy economy with minerals from the Ring of Fire, building infrastructure including Highway 413, the Bradford Bypass and expanding GO service, supporting workers by funding more skilled trades programs, raising the minimum hourly wage to $15 and allowing universities to issue three-year degrees, lowering taxes by eliminating license plate stickers, eliminating tolls and reducing housing development fees and lastly to avoid future COVID-19 lockdowns by hiring more healthcare workers..

The Official Opposition NDP's campaign focused on increased funding for social programs and government services, which would be paid for through higher taxes on businesses and individuals earning over $200,000 per year. Funding would go toward reducing class sizes, raising welfare payments and disability payments, subsidies for black, indigenous and LGBTQ+ entrepreneurs, hiring more healthcare and education staff and increased wages for public servants. The NDP also proposed to expand COVID-19 vaccine mandates, implement a mixed member proportional electoral system, to close down all privately owned long-term care facilities and to stop the construction of new highway projects.

2022 Ontario election – issues and respective party platforms
Issue	PC	NDP	Liberal	Green	New Blue	Ontario Party
Budget	Eliminate the deficit in the 2027–2028 fiscal year		Lower the deficit to $5 billion by 2025-2026; Present a balanced budget in the 2026-2027 fiscal year	Lower the deficit steadily from $20 billion in 2022–23 to $6 billion in 2025-26		
Business subsidies		Provide all mining tax revenue to northern Indigenous communities; Raise business taxes by an unspecified amount; Subsidize 2SLGBTQIA+, Black and Indigenous entrepreneurs, including the restoration of the Indigenous Culture Fund; Fund art projects dedicated to diversity, equity and inclusion; Create a small business recovery grant; Lift the cap on the Risk Management Program; Provide a loan guarantee to young farmers; Provide another round of Tourism Recovery Program payments	Guarantee loans to small businesses; Reimburse businesses for costs up to $200 a day for workers to take up to ten paid sick days		Eliminate Torstar's online gambling licence (NorthStar Gaming)	
COVID-19		Add COVID-19 vaccination to the immunization schedule for schools; Launch a public inquiry into Ontario's response to COVID-19; Require at least three vaccine doses for vaccine passports; Give the Chief Medical Officer of Health the authority to override government decisions	Add COVID-19 vaccination to the immunization schedule for schools; Launch a public inquiry into Ontario's response to COVID-19	Launch a public inquiry into Ontario's response to COVID-19	Eliminate all COVID-19 restrictions and mandates; Prohibit the use of COVID-19 vaccine passports by businesses; Expand early treatment for COVID-19	Eliminate all COVID-19 restrictions and mandates; Prohibit the use of COVID-19 vaccine passports by businesses; Outlaw the ability for the provincial government to impose lockdowns
Education	Invest $14 billion to build more schools; Expand three-year college degrees; Spend $42.5 million to expand medical education; Cover tuition and other costs for nursing graduates who commit to work in rural and underserved areas	End academic streaming; Hire 20,000 more teachers; Hire more custodians and school maintenance staff; Reduce Grade 4 to Grade 8 class sizes to 24; Reduce kindergarten class sizes to 26; Prioritize Ontario based authors and publishers in schools; Eliminate EQAO testing; Scrap mandatory online high school courses; Convert all OSAP loans to grants; Double the Rural and Northern Education Fund; Increase funding for special education; Increase the number of high school trades and shop classes; Forgive student loan interest	End academic streaming; Spend $10 billion building and repairing schools; Hire 10,000 more teachers; Hire 5,000 more special education workers; Cap class sizes at 20 students for all grades; Restore Grade 13 as an option for secondary school students for a minimum of 4 years; Eliminate EQAO tests and replace with new assessment strategy; Double current OSAP funding; Continue the tuition freeze; Eliminate interest on provincial student loans; Cover tuition costs for medical and nursing students working in a rural or remote communities; Provide free tuition for all ECE programs	Expand nursing schools by 7% every year; Reduce Grade 4 to Grade 8 class sizes to 24; Reduce kindergarten class sizes to 26; Introduce a school lunch program	Create a school voucher program; Remove Critical Race Theory from the curriculum; Remove gender theory from the curriculum	Create a school voucher program; Remove Critical Race Theory from the curriculum; Remove gender theory from the curriculum; Allow the creation of charter schools; Make it illegal for teachers to promote partisan political positions in the classroom; Allow parents to opt their children out of certain school lessons; Require universities to maintain free speech on campus; Require universities to hire ideologically diverse educators; Lower tuition fees for degrees with high labour market demand
Elections		Replace the electoral system with Mixed Member Proportional; Reduce annual political donation limits to $1600; Ban protests that incite racist, homophobic, transphobic or xenophobic hate	Introduce ranked ballots for the next provincial election followed by an independent review; Allow municipalities the usage of ranked ballot voting systems for elections; Explore potential changes such as lowering the voting age, voting on weekends and expanded advanced voting	Create citizens assembly on electoral reform with mandate to provide binding recommendation to ensure that every vote counts; Allow municipalities the usage of ranked ballot voting systems for elections; Limit total contribution for municipal elections to $1000 for all candidates, combined; Reduce donation limits for provincial political parties, candidates, and constituency associations to $1000 per year; Restore Auditor General oversight of government advertising; Require a five-year gap before MPPs and government advisors can register as lobbyists	Eliminate subsidies to political parties	Establish a process for voters to recall their MPP if they fail to represent them
Energy and Environment	Create a new provincial park; Subsidize the manufacturing of electric vehicles	Create a cap-and-trade system; Ban the sale of gasoline-powered vehicles by 2035; Create a $10,000 tax credit for the purchase of electric vehicles; Ban the conversion of any agricultural land into development; Expand the Greenbelt; Plant one billion trees by 2030; Ban non-medical single-use plastics by 2024; Upgrade public school buildings to make them carbon neutral	Create five new provincial parks; Ban new natural gas plants; Plant 100 million trees per year until 2030; Protect 30% of Ontario's land and expand the Greenbelt; Ban the sale of gasoline-powered vehicles by 2035; Create a $8,000 tax credit for the purchase or lease of electric vehicles and $1,500 for respective charging equipment; Eliminate connection fees for rooftop solar charging panels; Restrict some single-use plastics; Provide grants and interest-free loans to retrofit homes and buildings	Reduce electricity subsidies by $20 billion over 10 years; Eliminate gas-powered power plants; Oppose the building of new nuclear power plants or uranium mines; Protect 30% of Ontario's land and double the size of the Greenbelt		Ban the dumping of untreated waste into bodies of water; Fund municipal governments to upgrade sewage treatment
Healthcare	Build new hospitals in Niagara Falls; Windsor-Essex; Build 3,000 new hospital beds in 2022-2023; Provide publicly funded prescriptions to low-income seniors; Provide publicly funded dental care to low-income seniors; Offer incentive payments of up to $5,000 over the next two years to nurses who stay in the job	Repeal Bill 124; Establish provincial standards for home-care services and providers; Build 30,000 mental health supportive housing spaces over ten years; Provide publicly funded prescriptions to all residents; Provide publicly funded dental care to all residents; Increase hospital funding; Add additional funding to clear the surgical backlog; Eliminate all user fees in healthcare; Collect race-based data on health care; Hire 22,000 more nurses; Hire 300 more physicians in Northern Ontario; Stop mergers of public health units; Provide $400 per month to informal caregivers; Publicly fund contraception	Repeal Bill 124; Build 3,000 new hospital beds; Hire 100,000 new health care workers; Introduce a Portable Benefits Plan for those without or lacking in their employer benefits; provides drug, dental, vision, and mental health coverage; Build 15,000 mental health supportive housing spaces; Fully fund clinical costs for hospices; Build new hospitals in Windsor, South Niagara, Markdale, Moosonee, Moose Factory Island, Innisfil, Whitby and Ottawa	Build 60,000 mental health supportive housing spaces; Increase mental health funding; Provide publicly funded prescriptions; Provide publicly funded dental care; Create a dedicated crisis response line for mental health; Cover mental health therapy through public funding	Work on clearing the backlog of procedures	Do not fire healthcare workers who refuse to participate in abortion or assisted-suicide; End the prohibition on private health facilities and insurance; Prohibit sex-change surgeries for minors; Require parental consent for medical treatment for children
Housing	Use MZOs to approve the construction of more housing supply	Implement rent control; Subsidize rent for low-income households; End exclusionary zoning; Restore in-person hearings at the Landlord and Tenant Board	Implement rent control; Implement a ban on foreign buyers for at least four years; Fund the construction of 138,000 public housing units, of which 22,000 will be dedicated to off-reserve indigenous residents; Ban the use of MZOs	Implement rent control including vacancy control; Fund the construction of 100,000 public housing units; Restore 260,000 community housing units; Provide portable housing benefits to 311,000 people; End blind bidding; Require home inspections at the seller's expense		
Indigenous		Create an indigenous curriculum; Boost funding for Indigenous language education; Support more Indigenous representation on boards; Clean up the English-Wabigoon River system; Establish a provincial strategy to address the suicide crisis among Indigenous youth; Commission a monument that recognizes the victims of the residential school system; Establish the National Day for Truth and Reconciliation as a statutory holiday; Strengthen fire protection	Mandate the inclusion of residential schools into the curriculum	Reform child welfare and protection services by ensuring Indigenous communities are served by Indigenous-led providers; Wortk with NCTR to identify, collect, and provide copies of all records relevant to the history and legacy of the residential school system in Ontario; Make the National Day for Truth and Reconciliation a statutory holiday; Restore funding for the Indigenous curriculum program; Develop a mandatory curriculum on colonialism and residential schools, treaties, and Indigenous histories and experiences		
Law Enforcement		Expand supervised drug consumption sites; Ban carding	Expand supervised drug consumption sites; Hire more police officers from underrepresented demographics; Require police training in anti-racism, cultural sensitivity, and mental health	Expand supervised drug consumption sites		
Long-term care	Build 30,000 long-term care beds over six years; Create a standardized survey of long-term care residents	Phase out for-profit long-term care homes; Build 50,000 long-term care beds; Hire 10,000 more PSWs; Raise pay for PSWs by at least $5 per hour	Phase out for-profit long-term care homes; Build 30,000 long-term care beds over six years; redevelop an additional 28,000 existing spaces	Phase out for-profit long-term care homes		
Regulation	Raise the minimum wage to $15.50/h; Abolish the Ontario College of Trades; Approve the construction of oil and gas pipelines	Raise the minimum wage to $20/h over 5 years; Ban licensed sport shooters from owning handguns; Provide ten publicly funded sick days for all workers; Increase the number of jobs covered under Employment Standards and the Workplace Safety and Insurance Act; Implement price controls on gasoline; Require automobile insurance businesses to charge the same premiums in all regions of Ontario; Ban the issuing of payday loans; Require the hiring of more women and racial minorities; Implement UNDRIP; Require mandatory anti-oppression and anti-bias training for all public employees and politicians; Subject all government programs and regulations to a gender-based analysis	Raise the minimum wage to $16/h and implement regional living wages; Ban licensed sport shooters from owning handguns; Provide ten paid sick days for all workers	Raise the minimum wage each year by $1, starting at $16 in 2022, with a top-up in cities where the cost of living is higher; Increase the number of provincially-legislated paid sick days from three to ten, and provide small businesses financial support to fund the program; Ban employers from requiring a sick note from a medical practitioner when an employee is ill	Prohibit lobbyists from being involved in political parties; Make it illegal to conduct fraud in internal political party votes	Reduce immigration levels to match housing supply levels; Prohibit foreigners from buying houses; Repeal Bill 163
Social assistance	Increase ODSP payments by 5%	Increase ODSP payments by 20%; Increase OW payments by 20%; Conduct a basic income pilot project	Increase ODSP payments by 20%; Increase OW payments by 10%; Increase Old Age Security by $1,000 per year; Bring back the basic income pilot	Increase ODSP payments by 100%		
Taxation	Remove license plate sticker requirements and their respective fees; Reduce gasoline taxes by 5.7 cents per litre for six months starting on July 1, 2022; Reduce fuel taxes by 5.3 cents per litre starting on July 1, 2022; Increase the Non-Resident Speculation Tax and extend its reach beyond the GTHA; Extend qualification for the LIFT tax credit to $50,000; Create an Ontario Seniors Care at Home Tax Credit	Freeze taxes for low and middle income families; Create a tax on housing speculation; Introduce an annual vacancy tax on residential property; Maintain the Non-Resident Speculation Tax at 20%; Raise taxes on upper income workers by an unspecified amount; Create a filming tax-credit; Extend the Staycation tax credit	Remove the provincial sales tax from prepared meals under $20 (increase from $4); Increase the corporate tax rate by 1% on corporations with a profit above $1 billion; Increase the income tax rate by 2% on income over $500,000; Introduce a 5% tax on vacant homes for non-Canadian owners; 2% for Canadian owners; Introduce a ‘use it or lose it’ tax on developers sitting on land ready for development; Create a $75 tax credit for each winter tire installed; Increase the eligibility for the Low-Income Individuals and Families (LIFT) tax credit from $38,000 to $50,000; Rebate Northern municipalities 5% of the provincial mining tax; Suspend corporate income tax collection for small businesses for 2022 and 2023	Add a 1% surtax onto the income taxes of the top 10% earners; Introduce a 20% multiple homes speculation tax on third and additional properties	Reduce the Harmonized Sales Tax from 13% to 10%; Remove the carbon tax; Reduce taxes on gasoline	Eliminate the PST on gasoline and diesel
Transportation	Restore the Northlander service to Northern Ontario; Build Highway 413; Build the Bradford Bypass highway; Build new Highway 7 between Guelph and Kitchener; Rebuild Highway 101 through Timmins; Widen Highway 401 between Hespeler Road and Townline Road in Cambridge, between Whitby and Port Hope, and in Eastern Ontario; Widen Highway 17 to four lanes from Arnprior to Renfrew; Widen Highway 417 to eight lanes from Highway 416 to Maitland Avenue; Build Highway 6 Morriston Bypass, and complete interchanges on the Hanlon Expressway; Expand Highway 3 between Windsor and Leamington; Extend GO Transit trains to Bowmanville; Extend GO Transit trains to London; Build the Ontario Line subway, Scarborough subway extension, Yonge North subway extension, and Eglinton Crosstown west extension; Build a second Garden City Skyway twin bridge	Restore passenger rail service to Northern Ontario; Cancel the construction of Highway 413 and the Bradford Bypass; Require transit projects to make Canadian-made vehicles; Remove tolls on Highway 407 for commercial drivers; Pursue penalty fees from 407 ETR for failing to meet a minimum standard of traffic in 2020 and 2021; Designate Highways 11 and 17 as Class 1 highways; Four-lane Highway 69, Highway 11/17, Highway 3; the Morriston bypass; Move ahead with the Thunder Bay Expressway Interchange Project; Expand Highway 7 between Kitchener and Guelph; Fund two-way all-day GO Transit to Kitchener-Waterloo; Extend the Hurontario LRT to downtown Brampton; Fund 50% of municipal transit costs	Restore the Northlander service to Northern Ontario within two years; Cancel the construction of Highway 413; Reassess the proposed Bradford Bypass' environmental impact; Reduce all transit fares in Ontario to $1 per ride; Cut the cost for monthly passes to $40 per month; Make public transit publicly funded for veterans; Widen Highway 401 at targeted bottlenecks, including from Milton to Mississauga and between Pickering and Bowmanville; Build a new Highway 7 between Guelph and Kitchener; Expand Highway 3 between Windsor and Leamington; Complete the four-laning of Highway 69 and Highway 11/17 between Thunder Bay and Nipigon by 2025; Build the Ontario Line subway, Scarborough subway extension, Yonge North subway extension, and Eglinton Crosstown west extension; Fund two-way all-day GO Transit to Milton; Extend GO Transit trains to Bowmanville	Cancel the construction of Highway 413; Cut transit fares by 50% for at least 3 months; Fund 50% of municipal transit operating expenses; Expand GO Transit services		
Unions		Allow contractors to unionize; Allow any workplace to unionize when 55% of workers endorse unionization; Ban strikebreakers; Allow students to unionize	Allow contractors to unionize			

=== Endorsements ===
Endorsements received by each party
Type	PC	NDP	Liberal	Green	New Blue	Ontario Party
Media	Postmedia Network: National Post; Toronto Sun	Toronto Star endorsed the NDP, Liberals, and Greens, and encouraged Ontarians to vote strategically to prevent a PC majority				
Politicians and public figures	Don Cherry; Drew Dilkens; Gary McNamara; Hazel McCallion; Jim Diodati	Jagmeet Singh		David Suzuki	Corneliu Chisu	
Unions and business associations	Construction Council of Ontario, council within the IBEW; HVAC&R Workers of Ontario of the United Association; International Brotherhood of Boilermakers (IBB); International Union of Painters and Allied Trades (IUPAT); International Union of Operating Engineers (IUOE); Laborers' International Union of North America (LiUNA); Ontario Personal Support Workers Association (OPSWA); Ontario Pipe Trades Council of the United Association (OPTC of UA); Residential Construction Council of Ontario (RESCON); International Association of Sheet Metal, Air, Rail and Transportation Workers	Canadian Union of Public Employees (CUPE); Ontario Federation of Labour (OFL); United Food and Commercial Workers (UFCW); United Steelworkers (USW); Ontario Public Service Employees Union (OPSEU)		Service Employees International Union (SEIU); Ontario Secondary School Teachers' Federation (OSSTF/FEESO)		

== Opinion polls ==
=== Campaign polls ===

Opinion polls during campaign period
Polling firm	Last date of polling	Source	PC	NDP	Liberal	Green	New Blue	Ontario	Other	Margin of error	Sample size	Polling type	Lead
Forum Research	June 1, 2022		40.3	23.2	24.5	6.5	—	—	5.5	±3.1%	1,032	IVR	15.8
Research Co.	June 1, 2022		39	23	26	6	3	1	1	+3.8%	659	Online	13
EKOS	June 1, 2022		37	23.5	24.7	8.7	4.4	—	2	+2.6%	1,430	IVR	12.3
Abacus Data	June 1, 2022		40	22	27	4	4	—	3	N/A	1,043	Online	13
Mainstreet Research	June 1, 2022		38.9	22.8	24.2	9.4	—	—	4.7	+2.2%	2,034 (1/3)	IVR (rolling)	14.7
Ipsos	May 31, 2022		41	25	24	6	—	—	4	+2.2%	2,501	Telephone/Online	16
Nanos Research	May 31, 2022		38.8	24.7	26.3	6.1	2	2.1	0.2	±4.5%	465	Telephone/Online	12.5
Mainstreet Research	May 31, 2022		35.4	23.9	26.2	9.2	—	—	5.2	+2.1%	2,086 (1/3)	IVR (rolling)	9.2
Leger	May 30, 2022		40	24	25	5	3	2	1	N/A	1,334	Online	15
Innovative Research Group	May 30, 2022		34	24	29	8	3	—	2	N/A	637	Online	5
Mainstreet Research	May 30, 2022		39.3	22.5	26.8	6.4	—	—	5.1	+2.1%	2,089 (1/3)	IVR (rolling)	12.5
Earnscliffe/Leger	May 29, 2022		39	24	26	5	—	—	6	N/A	1,000	Online	13
Mainstreet Research	May 29, 2022		36.6	23.5	27.2	6.8	—	—	5.8	+2.2%	1,921 (1/3)	IVR (rolling)	9.4
Counsel	May 28, 2022		39.6	22.5	25.1	7.1	—	—	5.7	+2%	2,411	Online	14.5
Mainstreet Research	May 28, 2022		37.3	23.2	26.3	7.1	—	—	6.1	+2.3%	1,789 (1/3)	IVR (rolling)	11
Mainstreet Research	May 27, 2022		39.1	20.8	26.5	7.8	—	—	5.8	+2.4%	1,694 (1/3)	IVR (rolling)	12.6
Innovative Research Group	May 27, 2022		40	21	28	9	—	—	3	N/A	492	Telephone	12
Mainstreet Research	May 26, 2022		38.3	21.6	26.9	7.6	—	—	5.7	+2.4%	1,704 (1/3)	IVR (rolling)	11.4
Angus Reid	May 25, 2022		38	24	26	7	—	—	5	N/A	1,331	Online	12
EKOS	May 25, 2022		33.7	23.8	26.9	8	4.7	—	3	+3.1%	1,017	IVR	6.8
Mainstreet Research	May 25, 2022		36	23.5	26.1	8.5	—	—	5.9	+2.4%	1,622 (1/3)	IVR (rolling)	9.9
Mainstreet Research	May 24, 2022		35.3	23.1	27.2	8	—	—	6.4	+2.4%	1,724 (1/3)	IVR (rolling)	8.1
Leger	May 23, 2022		38	24	26	6	3	2	1	N/A	1,324	Online	12
Innovative Research Group	May 23, 2022		35	23	30	9	—	—	4	N/A	439	Online	5
Mainstreet Research	May 23, 2022		35.4	24.2	25.2	7.8	—	—	7.4	+2.4%	1,696 (1/3)	IVR (rolling)	10.2
Nanos Research	May 22, 2022		37.3	23.2	28	6.3	3	1.7	0.3	±4.5%	479	Telephone/Online	9.3
Earnscliffe/Leger	May 22, 2022		36	24	28	6	—	—	6	N/A	1,000	Online	8
EKOS	May 22, 2022		34.5	24.1	26.7	6.6	5.3	—	2.7	+3.2%	948	IVR	7.8
Mainstreet Research	May 22, 2022		35	23.8	25.1	8.2	—	—	7.9	+2.4%	1,709 (1/3)	IVR (rolling)	9.9
Abacus Data	May 21, 2022		36	24	28	5	—	—	8	N/A	1,228	Online	8
Mainstreet Research	May 21, 2022		34.4	25.1	26.7	7.2	—	—	6.5	+2.4%	1,679 (1/3)	IVR (rolling)	7.7
Mainstreet Research	May 20, 2022		35.5	26.1	25.7	6.5	—	—	6.3	+2.4%	1,734 (1/3)	IVR (rolling)	9.4
Pollara	May 19, 2022		40	21	27	8	—	—	4	+2.5%	1,514	Telephone	13
Ipsos	May 19, 2022		38	23	28	6	—	—	5	+2.9%	1,501	Telephone/Online	10
Innovative Research Group	May 19, 2022		36	26	28	8	—	—	2	N/A	606	Online	8
Mainstreet Research	May 19, 2022		36.9	24.7	26.2	5.1	—	—	7.2	+2.4%	1,686 (1/3)	IVR (rolling)	10.7
Counsel	May 18, 2022		36.9	24.3	27.5	6.1	—	—	5.3	+2.1%	2,206	Online	9.4
Mainstreet Research	May 18, 2022		37.2	23.4	24.8	6.7	—	—	7.8	+2.4%	1,720 (1/3)	IVR (rolling)	12.8
Nanos Research	May 17, 2022		36.1	19.8	29.3	7.3	4.7	1.7	1.1	±4.5%	484	Telephone/Online	6.8
Research Co.	May 17, 2022		34	23	29	7	3	1	2	+4%	602	Online	5
EKOS	May 17, 2022		40.7	23.9	24.3	5.1	—	—	6.1	+4%	593	IVR	16.4
Mainstreet Research	May 17, 2022		36.8	23.1	27.2	5.6	—	—	7.3	+2.4%	1,675 (1/3)	IVR (rolling)	9.6
Innovative Research Group	May 16, 2022		36	23	31	7	—	—	4	N/A	603	Online	5
Mainstreet Research	May 16, 2022		37.9	22.8	27.7	4.9	—	—	6.8	+2.4%	1,675 (1/3)	IVR (rolling)	10.2
Earnscliffe/Leger	May 15, 2022		37	23	28	7	—	—	5	N/A	1,000	Online	9
Leger	May 15, 2022		37	23	28	5	3	3	1	N/A	830	Online	9
Abacus Data	May 15, 2022		35	24	28	5	—	—	7	N/A	798	Online	7
Mainstreet Research	May 15, 2022		35.5	24.8	26.8	4.4	—	—	8.5	+2.3%	1,792 (1/3)	IVR (rolling)	8.7
Mainstreet Research	May 14, 2022		36	25.4	27.6	4.1	—	—	7	+2.3%	1,764 (1/3)	IVR (rolling)	8.4
Mainstreet Research	May 13, 2022		36	24.4	26.8	5.2	—	—	7.5	+2.3%	1,773 (1/3)	IVR (rolling)	9.2
Mainstreet Research	May 12, 2022		36.6	22.6	28.6	5.2	—	—	7	+2.4%	1,639 (1/3)	IVR (rolling)	8
Mainstreet Research	May 11, 2022		38.8	21.1	28.1	5.4	—	—	6.6	+2.4%	1,673 (1/3)	IVR (rolling)	10.7
Mainstreet Research	May 10, 2022		39.0	22.3	27.1	4.6	—	—	7	+2.4%	1,639 (1/3)	IVR (rolling)	11.9
Mainstreet Research	May 9, 2022		36.5	23.5	29	4.9	—	—	6.1	+2.5%	1,639 (1/3)	IVR (rolling)	7.5
Abacus Data	May 9, 2022		38	22	29	5	—	—	7	N/A	1,208	Online	9
Innovative Research Group	May 9, 2022		40	24	28	6	—	—	3	N/A	600	Online	12
EKOS	May 9, 2022		33.9	25.4	29.3	5.1	—	—	6.3	+3.1%	1,000	IVR	4.6
Nanos Research	May 8, 2022		35.4	23.7	30.4	4.2	3.6	1.4	1.2	±4.4%	500	Telephone/Online	5.0
Earnscliffe/Leger	May 8, 2022		39	24	27	6	—	—	3	N/A	1,000	Online	12
Leger	May 8, 2022		39	25	26	4	3	1	2	N/A	819	Online	13
Mainstreet Research	May 8, 2022		37	23	30	5	—	—	5	+2.5%	1,515 (1/3)	IVR (rolling)	7
Mainstreet Research	May 7, 2022		36.3	24.2	30.2	4.6	—	—	4.6	+2.5%	1,496 (1/3)	IVR (rolling)	6.1
Mainstreet Research	May 6, 2022		38.3	24.5	29.1	4	—	—	4	+2.5%	1,532 (1/3)	IVR (rolling)	9.2
Mainstreet Research	May 5, 2022		37.4	25.7	28.1	4.6	—	—	4.2	±2.7%	1,335 (1/3)	IVR (rolling)	9.3
Forum Research	May 4, 2022		37	26	29	4	—	—	4	±3%	1,541	IVR	8
Mainstreet Research	May 4, 2022		36.7	25.1	27.1	5.7	—	—	5.3	±2.7%	1,335 (1/3)	IVR (rolling)	9.6

=== Pre-campaign polls ===

Opinion polling before campaign period began
Polling firm	Last date of polling	Source	PC	NDP	Liberal	Green	New Blue	Ontario	Other	Margin of error	Sample size	Polling type	Lead
Nanos Research	May 2, 2022		36.9	23.7	30.4	4.3	0.9	2.8	0.8	±4.4%	500	Telephone/Online	6.5
Innovative Research Group	May 2, 2022		37	24	29	7	—	—	2	N/A	1,409	Online	8
Earnscliffe/Leger	May 1, 2022		35	24	28	7	—	—	6	N/A	1,001	Online	7
Ipsos	May 1, 2022		39	25	26	6	—	—	5	±2.9%	1,501	Telephone/Online	13
Mainstreet Research	April 27, 2022		38.1	18.1	30.4	5.1	—	—	8.3	±2.6%	1,422	IVR	7.7
Earnscliffe/Leger	April 24, 2022		38	25	28	5	—	—	5	N/A	1,000	Online	10
Abacus Data	April 19, 2022		36	23	32	6	—	—	4	±2.1%	1,500	Online	4
Mainstreet Research	April 19, 2022		39.6	21.2	25.4	5.6	—	—	7.6	±2.8%	1,211	IVR	14.2
Ipsos	April 14, 2022		35	23	32	5	—	—	5	±3.5%	1,001	Online	3
Mainstreet Research	April 12, 2022		36	24	28	5	—	—	6	±2.8%	1239	IVR	8
Mainstreet Research	April 6, 2022		39.2	24.1	25.8	3.4	—	—	7.5	±2.7%	1,289	IVR	13.4
Mainstreet Research	March 31, 2022		36	22	31	4	—	—	7	±2.8%	1,252	IVR	5
Leger	March 28, 2022		39	24	25	5	5	—	3	±3.1%	1,001	Online	14
Angus Reid	March 15, 2022		37	29	25	4	—	—	5	±3%	1,063	Online	8
Ipsos	March 15, 2022		38	24	28	4	—	—	5	±3.8%	850	Online	10
Mainstreet Research	March 13, 2022		33.9	25.7	27.8	5	—	—	7.6	±3%	1,026	IVR	6.1
Leger	February 27, 2022		39	27	27	3	2	—	2 (Note: 1% for Ontario First.)	±3.1%	1,001	Online	12
Mainstreet Research	January 25, 2022		34.6	22.4	27.3	3.5	—	—	12.3	±3%	882	IVR	7.3
Leger	January 24, 2022		37	25	26	7	3	—	5 (Note: 2% for Ontario First.)	±3.1%	1,000	Online	11
Counsel	January 23, 2022		34.9	30.5	24.2	4.4	—	—	6	±2.1%	2,273	Online	4.4
EKOS	January 17, 2022		34.8	26.6	26.3	4.9	—	—	7.5	±3.5%	844	IVR	8.2
Abacus Data	January 12, 2022		37	25	28	5	—	—	2.5	±3.1%	1,210	Online	9
Angus Reid	January 12, 2022		33	36	19	4	—	—	8	N/A	909	Online	3
Innovative Research Group	January 11, 2022		35	22	36	5	—	—	2	N/A	428	Online	1
Mainstreet Research	January 7, 2022		30.6	27.0	27.9	5.5	—	—	9.0	±2.7%	1,246	IVR	2.7
December 14, 2021	Derek Sloan announced as the Leader of the Ontario Party												
Leger	December 13, 2021		38	28	25	5	2	—	3	±3.1%	1,000	Online	10
EKOS	November 25, 2021		32.8	23.1	28.3	5.2	—	—	10.5	±4.1%	569	IVR	4.5
Innovative Research Group	November 17, 2021		34.8	27	32.6	3.4	—	—	2.2	N/A	1,000	Online	2.2
Leger	November 14, 2021		34	26	31	6	2	—	1	±3.1%	1,001	Online	3
Leger	October 10, 2021		35	25	30	5	—	—	5	±3.1%	1,003	Online	5
Angus Reid	October 3, 2021		34	32	25	4	—	—	5	N/A	910	Online	2
Angus Reid	June 7, 2021		37	33	22	6	—	—	3	±2%	791	Online	4
Leger	May 23, 2021		34	25	26	9	—	—	—	±3.1%	1,001	Online	8
Mainstreet Research	May 16, 2021		32.7	28.2	26.9	6.3	—	—	5.9	±3%	958	IVR	4.5
Campaign Research	May 8, 2021		36	25	28	7	—	—	4	±2%	2,009	Online	8
Innovative Research Group	May 4, 2021		32	22	36	8	—	—	2	N/A	481	Online	4
Abacus Data	April 21, 2021		34	23	35	5	—	—	2	±3.1%	1,007	Online	1
Innovative Research Group	April 20, 2021		30	26	35	8	—	—	1	N/A	800	Online	5
Abacus Data	April 14, 2021		34	23	34	5	—	—	4	±3.5%	817	Online	0
Innovative Research Group	April 13, 2021		32	24	33	8	—	—	2	N/A	704	Online	1
EKOS	April 12, 2021		34.6	23.5	29.9	8.9	—	—	3	±2.8%	1,204	IVR	4.7
Campaign Research	April 6, 2021		41	22	24	10	—	—	2	±2.3%	1,886	Online	17
Leger	March 22, 2021		38	28	23	8	—	—	3	±3.1%	1,002	Online	10
Campaign Research	March 11, 2021		43	25	20	9	—	—	3	±2.7%	1,344	Online	18
Mainstreet Research	February 16, 2021		43	22	25	6	—	—	4	±3.08%	1,011	IVR	18
Campaign Research	January 31, 2021		44	25	21	8	—	—	3	±2.6%	1,427	Online	19
Abacus Data	January 12, 2021		34	25	29	8	—	—	3	±3.48%	793	Online	5
Mainstreet Research	December 5, 2020		46.2	23.4	19.9	6.2	—	—	4.3	±2.94%	1,014	IVR	22.8
Campaign Research	December 3, 2020		45	20	24	8	—	—	5	±3%	1,001	Online	21
Angus Reid	November 30, 2020		42	28	22	5	—	—	3	N/A	1,049	Online	14
Campaign Research	November 2, 2020		48	21	23	7	—	—	1	±3%	1,118	Online	25
Abacus Data	October 30, 2020		36	25	29	7	—	—	3	±3.1%	1,000	Online	7
October 12, 2020	Jim Karahalios forms the New Blue Party												
Abacus Data	October 12, 2020		36	29	26	6	—	—	2	±3.1%	1,000	Online	7
Campaign Research	October 2, 2020		46	24	20	9	—	—	2	±3%	1,017	Online	22
Campaign Research	September 3, 2020		48	22	24	6	—	—	2	±3%	1,129	Online	24
Angus Reid	September 1, 2020		45	28	22	4	—	—	1	±3%	1,026	Online	17
Campaign Research	August 13, 2020		41	23	26	8	—	—	3	±2%	2,013	Online	15
Innovative Research Group	July 20, 2020		36	18	37	8	—	—	1	N/A	974	Online	1
Campaign Research	July 10, 2020		45	20	27	7	—	—	1	±3%	1,395	Online	18
Innovative Research Group	June 23, 2020		31	21	39	9	—	—	1	N/A	838	Online	8
Mainstreet Research	June 7, 2020		41.8	23.0	27.7	5.5	—	—	2.0	±3%	1,068	IVR	14.1
Campaign Research	June 2, 2020		44	22	27	6	—	—	2	±2.5%	1,512	Online	17
Innovative Research Group	June 1, 2020		33	20	38	9	—	—	0	N/A	698	Online	5
Angus Reid	May 24, 2020		43	26	25	6	—	—	1	N/A	1,061	Online	17
Abacus Data	May 22, 2020		36	19	38	5	—	—	2	±4.1%	597	Online	2
Innovative Research Group	May 5, 2020		34	18	39	7	—	—	1	N/A	791	Online	5
EKOS	March 26, 2020		31.5	17.9	40.4	7.1	—	—	3.1	±3.5%	774	IVR	8.9
Mainstreet Research	March 20, 2020		33.1	23.2	33.0	6.9	—	—	3.8	±2.73%	1,017	IVR	0.1
7 March 2020	Steven Del Duca is elected as leader of the Ontario Liberal Party												
Campaign Research	March 5, 2020		32	28	28	10	—	—	2	±2.9%	1,144	Online	4
Angus Reid	February 28, 2020		36	31	24	8	—	—	1	±3.0%	1,051	Online	5
Campaign Research	February 26, 2020		32	28	29	9	—	—	3	±3.1%	1,003	Online	3
Campaign Research	February 9, 2020		30	26	30	11	—	—	3	±2.5%	1,536	Online	0
EKOS	January 19, 2020		31.1	21.2	36.2	9.1	—	—	2.3	±3.9%	634	IVR	5.1
Pollara	January 11, 2020		29	27	33	9	—	—	2	±2.1%	2,198	Online	4
EKOS	December 10, 2019		29.9	24.4	32.4	9.4	—	—	3.9	±3.4%	811	IVR	2.5
Campaign Research	September 9, 2019		32	27	28	11	—	—	2	±3.17%	957	Online	4
Corbett Communications	August 16, 2019		30	28	30	11	—	—	2	±3.0%	1,099	Online	0
Corbett Communications	July 10, 2019		28	26	28	15	—	—	3	±3.0%	936	Online	0
Corbett Communications	June 6, 2019		32	27	26	13	—	—	1	±3.0%	1,555	Online	5
Mainstreet Research	May 22, 2019		22.4	24.2	39.9	11.7	—	—	1.8	±3.1%	996	IVR	15.7
Ipsos	May 21, 2019		30	29	32	—	—	—	10	±3.5%	1,000	Online	2
Corbett Communications	May 3, 2019		35	25	27	12	—	—	1	±2.4%	1,836	Online	8
Pollara	May 1, 2019		30	31	26	11	—	—	1	±2.5%	1,527	Online	1
Mainstreet Research	March 22, 2019		34.4	26.6	26.0	9.4	—	—	3.6	±2.73%	1,290	IVR	7.8
Innovative Research Group	January 24, 2019		33	23	36	7	—	—	1		751	Online	3
Mainstreet Research	January 17, 2019		41.4	27.0	22.6	7.0	—	—	2.2	±2.92%	1,127	IVR	14.4
EKOS	December 3, 2018		34.3	26.1	28.0	9.4	—	—	2.3	±3.1%	1,025	IVR	6.3
Campaign Research	November 9, 2018		34	25	32	7	—	—	2	±2.3%	1,830	Online	2
Mainstreet Research	November 7, 2018		42.2	26.5	21.3	6.4	—	—	3.5	±2.79%	1,229	IVR	15.7
Innovative Research Group	October 28, 2018		35	25	32	7	—	—	1		1,628	Online	3
Abacus Data	October 1, 2018		36	29	24	8	—	—	3		1,500	Online	7
Mainstreet Research	July 17, 2018		41.7	27.8	21.3	6.7	—	—	2.5	±2.27%	1,861	IVR	13.9
29 June 2018	Doug Ford is sworn in as Premier of Ontario												
Innovative Research Group	June 21, 2018		37	36	19	7	—	—	2	±4.0%	607	Telephone	1
14 June 2018	John Fraser becomes interim leader of the Ontario Liberal Party												
7 June 2018	Kathleen Wynne resigns as leader of the Ontario Liberal Party												
2018 election	June 7, 2018	—N/a	40.50	33.56	19.59	4.60	—	0.04	1.74	—N/a	5,744,860	—N/a	6.94
Polling firm	Last date of polling	Source								Margin of error	Sample size	Polling type	Lead
Polling firm	Last date of polling	Source	PC	NDP	Liberal	Green	New Blue	Ontario	Other	Margin of error	Sample size	Polling type	Lead

== Results ==
The disproportionality of elections to the Legislative Assembly in the 2022 election was 22.59 according to the Gallagher Index, mainly due to the disparity between the vote share and seat share of the Liberals and PCs.

Turnout by riding contrasted, 2022 vs 2018.

Despite only posting a marginal increase in the popular vote, the Progressive Conservative Party won with an increased parliamentary majority.

PC gains came primarily at the expense of the New Democratic Party, who lost significant vote share primarily to the Liberal Party. Nevertheless, the NDP maintained their role as official opposition by a large margin. Although she won her seat, Andrea Horwath resigned as leader of the NDP.

Despite edging out the NDP for second place in the popular vote, the Liberals only gained one seat and failed to regain official party status. After failing to win in his own riding, Liberal leader Steven Del Duca also announced his resignation as party leader.

The only two candidates outside the three largest parties to be elected were Green Party leader Mike Schreiner and independent candidate Bobbi Ann Brady, who prior to the election was the executive assistant to the retiring PC MPP in her riding.

The official results, certified by Elections Ontario, are as follows:

↓
83	31	8	1	1
Progressive Conservative	New Democratic	Liberal	G	I

Party	Votes			Seats
Progressive Conservative	1,912,057	40.83%	▲0.33pp	83 / 124 (67%)
New Democratic	1,111,923	23.74%	▼9.85pp	31 / 124 (25%)
Liberal	1,116,961	23.91%	▲4.32pp	8 / 124 (6%)
Green	279,152	5.96%	▲1.36pp	1 / 124 (0.8%)
Independent (Note: Bobbi Ann Brady was elected for Haldimand—Norfolk with 15,921 votes, or 0.34% of the province-wide vote.)	25,334	0.53%	▲0.39pp	1 / 124 (0.8%)

Popular vote
PC	40.83%
Liberal	23.91%
New Democratic	23.74%
Green	5.96%
Others	5.56%

Seat summary
PC	66.94%
New Democratic	25.00%
Liberal	6.45%
Green	0.81%
Others	0.81%

=== Synopsis of results ===
Results by riding - 2022 Ontario general election (Note: Summarized from "Data Explorer". Elections Ontario.) (Note: Summarized from "Statistical Summary by Electoral District: 2022 Provincial General Election". Elections Ontario.) (Note: Summarized from "Summary of Valid Votes Cast for Each Candidate: 2022 Provincial General Election". Elections Ontario.)
Riding	Winning party							Turnout (Note: including spoilt ballots) (Note: Provincewide turnout was 44.06%)	Votes (Note: minor political parties receiving less than 1% of the popular vote are aggregated under "Other"; independent candidates are aggregated separately)								
Riding	2018	1st place	Votes	Share	Margin #	Margin %	2nd place	Turnout	PC	NDP	Lib	Green	NB	Ont	Ind	Other	Total
Ajax	PC	PC	15,336	40.69%	1,775	4.71%	Lib	39.96%	15,336	6,291	13,561	1,305	625	330	239	–	37,687
Algoma—Manitoulin	NDP	NDP	11,252	45.93%	2,560	10.45%	PC	42.47%	8,692	11,252	2,133	764	1,302	356	–	–	24,499
Aurora—Oak Ridges—Richmond Hill	PC	PC	17,340	53.26%	7,340	22.55%	Lib	38.19%	17,340	2,501	10,000	1,268	649	732	–	69	32,559
Barrie—Innisfil	PC	PC	18,225	50.25%	11,283	31.11%	NDP	39.61%	18,225	6,942	6,564	2,291	1,220	764	147	119	36,272
Barrie—Springwater—Oro-Medonte	PC	PC	16,631	42.10%	296	0.75%	Lib	46.75%	16,631	3,093	16,335	1,699	1,104	638	–	–	39,500
Bay of Quinte	PC	PC	21,381	49.30%	12,308	28.38%	NDP	45.91%	21,381	9,073	8,003	2,719	1,128	1,062	–	–	43,366
Beaches—East York	NDP	Lib	14,398	35.42%	898	2.21%	NDP	49.58%	7,536	13,500	14,398	4,154	441	310	–	309	40,648
Brampton Centre	NDP	PC	10,119	41.36%	3,597	14.70%	NDP	36.67%	10,119	6,522	6,119	882	821	–	–	–	24,463
Brampton East	NDP	PC	12,869	44.32%	3,852	13.27%	NDP	36.35%	12,869	9,017	6,131	557	295	167	–	–	29,036
Brampton North	NDP	PC	13,509	44.99%	4,870	16.22%	Lib	38.46%	13,509	5,949	8,639	895	610	423	–	–	30,025
Brampton South	PC	PC	12,980	45.38%	5,023	17.56%	Lib	35.81%	12,980	5,475	7,957	1,028	974	–	–	188	28,602
Brampton West	PC	PC	14,751	47.84%	6,662	21.60%	Lib	34.19%	14,751	6,398	8,089	854	511	233	–	–	30,836
Brantford—Brant	PC	PC	20,738	44.17%	7,455	15.88%	NDP	42.05%	20,738	13,283	6,083	3,174	2,089	640	157	789	46,953
Bruce—Grey—Owen Sound	PC	PC	20,304	48.56%	11,805	28.23%	Lib	47.02%	20,304	5,817	8,499	3,702	1,130	1,680	201	478	41,811
Burlington	PC	PC	22,348	42.55%	6,896	13.13%	Lib	51.63%	22,348	9,262	15,452	3,515	1,310	633	–	–	52,520
Cambridge	PC	PC	14,590	37.03%	5,845	14.83%	NDP	43.22%	14,590	8,745	8,155	3,537	4,374	–	–	–	39,401
Carleton	PC	PC	22,295	48.15%	9,843	21.26%	Lib	48.79%	22,295	7,256	12,452	2,537	1,037	494	–	235	46,306
Chatham-Kent—Leamington	PC	PC	17,522	47.52%	6,359	17.25%	NDP	44.87%	17,522	11,163	–	1,244	1,463	5,478	–	–	36,870
Davenport	NDP	NDP	20,242	57.06%	13,427	37.85%	Lib	43.30%	4,994	20,242	6,815	1,710	395	400	216	701	35,473
Don Valley East	Lib	Lib	12,313	43.86%	3,275	11.66%	PC	42.37%	9,038	4,355	12,313	1,139	323	295	192	421	28,076
Don Valley North	PC	PC	15,041	47.41%	3,356	10.58%	Lib	40.76%	15,041	3,133	11,685	1,179	690	–	–	–	31,728
Don Valley West	Lib	Lib	16,177	44.01%	1,969	5.36%	PC	49.36%	14,208	3,392	16,177	2,025	421	167	85	285	36,760
Dufferin—Caledon	PC	PC	22,911	49.67%	14,223	30.86%	Lib	42.07%	22,911	4,967	8,678	6,518	2,280	589	–	184	46,127
Durham	PC	PC	22,614	45.85%	10,338	20.96%	Lib	43.71%	22,614	9,168	12,276	1,981	1,898	686	697	–	49,320
Eglinton—Lawrence	PC	PC	16,605	42.30%	524	1.33%	Lib	46.72%	16,605	3,801	16,081	1,513	393	268	216	381	39,258
Elgin—Middlesex—London	PC	PC	22,369	51.08%	14,396	32.87%	NDP	44.78%	22,369	7,973	7,618	2,043	2,238	1,092	–	458	43,791
Essex	NDP	PC	24,926	51.10%	11,133	22.82%	NDP	47.21%	24,926	13,793	4,186	989	1,293	3,322	–	271	48,780
Etobicoke Centre	PC	PC	22,035	48.59%	6,592	14.54%	Lib	48.55%	22,035	3,906	15,443	2,036	1,117	530	–	284	45,351
Etobicoke—Lakeshore	PC	PC	17,978	37.48%	842	1.76%	Lib	45.28%	17,978	8,595	17,136	2,278	1,612	–	186	181	47,966
Etobicoke North	PC	PC	13,934	55.51%	8,050	32.07%	Lib	33.98%	13,934	3,290	5,884	690	391	782	–	132	25,103
Flamborough—Glanbrook	PC	PC	20,306	46.20%	10,311	23.46%	NDP	46.91%	20,306	9,995	8,970	2,392	1,492	710	–	86	43,951
Glengarry—Prescott—Russell	PC	PC	18,661	42.05%	1,132	2.55%	Lib	45.56%	18,661	3,789	17,529	1,670	1,924	809	–	–	44,382
Guelph	Green	Green	29,752	54.45%	18,603	34.05%	PC	49.39%	11,149	4,402	7,263	29,752	1,619	–	–	453	54,638
Haldimand—Norfolk	PC	Ind	15,921	35.05%	2,070	4.56%	PC	48.88%	13,851	6,311	3,329	1,841	1,454	2,353	16,020	268	45,427
Haliburton—Kawartha Lakes—Brock	PC	PC	25,594	52.31%	17,902	36.59%	NDP	48.14%	25,594	7,692	6,590	3,695	888	3,949	–	518	48,926
Hamilton Centre	NDP	NDP	16,690	57.26%	11,890	40.79%	PC	37.94%	4,800	16,690	3,799	2,554	483	451	145	225	29,147
Hamilton East—Stoney Creek	NDP	PC	12,166	34.60%	2,552	7.26%	NDP	40.95%	12,166	9,614	7,411	1,740	693	1,052	2,411	79	35,166
Hamilton Mountain	NDP	NDP	15,250	44.81%	5,039	14.81%	PC	41.49%	10,211	15,250	5,300	1,913	770	590	–	–	34,034
Hamilton West—Ancaster—Dundas	NDP	NDP	18,197	40.42%	3,345	7.43%	PC	48.45%	14,852	18,197	8,184	2,416	904	464	–	–	45,017
Hastings—Lennox and Addington	PC	PC	18,156	47.55%	10,898	28.54%	NDP	47.12%	18,156	7,258	7,102	1,732	1,129	2,807	–	–	38,184
Humber River—Black Creek	NDP	NDP	7,959	34.49%	883	3.83%	Lib	33.15%	6,865	7,959	7,076	430	281	357	110	–	23,078
Huron—Bruce	PC	PC	24,369	51.97%	15,594	33.26%	Lib	54.16%	24,369	7,679	8,775	1,922	3,384	474	212	77	46,892
Kanata—Carleton	PC	PC	19,871	43.61%	8,826	19.37%	NDP	51.38%	19,871	11,045	10,672	2,503	1,085	393	–	–	45,569
Kenora—Rainy River	PC	PC	9,567	59.57%	6,368	39.65%	NDP	40.21%	9,567	3,199	1,823	608	393	276	95	98	16,059
Kiiwetinoong	NDP	NDP	2,742	57.57%	1,316	27.63%	PC	30.40%	1,426	2,742	281	158	156	–	–	–	4,763
King—Vaughan	PC	PC	23,439	57.31%	11,781	28.81%	Lib	39.79%	23,439	2,840	11,658	1,104	1,400	309	–	147	40,897
Kingston and the Islands	NDP	Lib	18,360	37.66%	3,174	6.51%	NDP	46.84%	11,973	15,186	18,360	1,601	429	827	130	243	48,749
Kitchener Centre	NDP	NDP	15,789	40.59%	5,413	13.91%	PC	46.21%	10,376	15,789	5,728	4,980	2,029	–	–	–	38,902
Kitchener—Conestoga	PC	PC	15,045	40.03%	4,194	11.16%	NDP	48.88%	15,045	10,851	6,590	2,315	2,223	501	–	64	37,589
Kitchener South—Hespeler	PC	PC	13,768	39.91%	4,650	13.48%	NDP	42.16%	13,768	9,118	5,629	3,993	1,436	552	–	–	34,496
Lambton—Kent—Middlesex	PC	PC	24,933	58.81%	16,946	39.97%	NDP	47.28%	24,933	7,987	4,063	1,688	2,701	727	–	300	42,399
Lanark—Frontenac—Kingston	PC	PC	22,142	50.11%	12,996	29.41%	NDP	50.02%	22,142	9,146	6,962	2,982	753	1,663	213	324	44,185
Leeds—Grenville—Thousand Islands and Rideau Lakes	PC	PC	24,657	57.69%	16,911	39.56%	Lib	49.18%	24,657	5,799	7,746	2,583	944	536	–	479	42,744
London—Fanshawe	NDP	NDP	16,123	47.06%	4,899	14.30%	PC	36.56%	11,224	16,123	3,553	1,200	1,072	539	–	549	34,260
London North Centre	NDP	NDP	17,082	39.65%	4,031	9.36%	PC	42.13%	13,051	17,082	9,013	2,064	1,200	368	–	307	43,085
London West	NDP	NDP	22,510	45.13%	5,624	11.27%	PC	48.62%	16,886	22,510	6,077	1,713	1,277	521	–	898	49,882
Markham—Stouffville	PC	PC	21,176	48.43%	5,664	12.95%	Lib	44.51%	21,176	4,137	15,512	1,723	658	517	–	–	43,723
Markham—Thornhill	PC	PC	14,011	48.82%	3,248	11.32%	Lib	39.68%	14,011	2,597	10,763	733	376	–	–	219	28,699
Markham—Unionville	PC	PC	19,985	56.42%	9,211	26.00%	Lib	39.12%	19,985	2,579	10,774	1,299	536	249	–	–	35,422
Milton	PC	PC	16,766	43.07%	1,680	4.32%	Lib	42.70%	16,766	3,777	15,086	1,612	1,579	–	–	107	38,927
Mississauga Centre	PC	PC	14,719	43.60%	2,459	7.28%	Lib	38.14%	14,719	4,148	12,260	1,188	523	332	–	588	33,758
Mississauga East—Cooksville	PC	PC	13,840	40.91%	1,206	3.57%	Lib	39.58%	13,840	3,664	12,634	1,345	1,599	625	–	121	33,828
Mississauga—Erin Mills	PC	PC	15,693	42.15%	1,736	4.66%	Lib	41.70%	15,693	4,521	13,954	1,594	978	495	–	–	37,235
Mississauga—Lakeshore	PC	PC	19,341	45.09%	3,573	8.33%	Lib	46.95%	19,341	3,647	15,768	2,160	1,014	501	–	459	42,890
Mississauga—Malton	PC	PC	13,028	44.89%	4,190	14.44%	Lib	36.51%	13,028	5,140	8,838	1,173	844	–	–	–	29,023
Mississauga—Streetsville	PC	PC	17,317	45.58%	3,838	10.10%	Lib	42.67%	17,317	4,554	13,479	1,137	737	484	–	281	37,989
Mushkegowuk—James Bay	NDP	NDP	3,423	47.18%	829	11.43%	PC	39.40%	2,594	3,423	852	141	222	–	–	23	7,255
Nepean	PC	PC	17,123	39.26%	2,094	4.80%	Lib	45.89%	17,123	8,435	15,029	1,696	964	370	–	–	43,617
Newmarket—Aurora	PC	PC	18,671	44.97%	5,602	13.49%	Lib	44.42%	18,671	5,281	13,069	2,332	1,520	532	–	118	41,523
Niagara Centre	NDP	NDP	16,360	39.70%	854	2.07%	PC	43.37%	15,506	16,360	5,492	1,865	1,148	837	–	–	41,208
Niagara Falls	NDP	NDP	24,207	48.08%	5,865	11.65%	PC	43.60%	18,342	24,207	4,239	1,356	1,409	656	–	135	50,344
Niagara West	PC	PC	18,779	44.93%	10,121	24.22%	NDP	53.16%	18,779	8,658	8,013	2,702	1,098	2,207	–	339	41,796
Nickel Belt	NDP	NDP	15,611	50.77%	6,430	20.91%	PC	45.51%	9,181	15,611	3,042	921	1,522	470	–	–	30,747
Nipissing	PC	PC	15,392	50.20%	6,727	21.94%	NDP	48.29%	15,392	8,665	4,150	1,025	399	616	–	412	30,659
Northumberland—Peterborough South	PC	PC	26,419	50.93%	13,483	25.99%	Lib	51.72%	26,419	6,806	12,936	2,942	1,170	1,598	–	–	51,871
Oakville	PC	PC	21,162	45.44%	3,608	7.75%	Lib	50.29%	21,162	3,154	17,554	2,416	764	497	–	1,022	46,569
Oakville North—Burlington	PC	PC	22,221	47.18%	5,590	11.87%	Lib	46.89%	22,221	4,673	16,631	2,027	1,097	446	–	–	47,095
Orléans	Lib	Lib	23,982	46.26%	15,413	13.61%	PC	46.59%	16,926	7,150	23,982	2,359	796	442	–	184	51,839
Oshawa	NDP	NDP	17,170	42.07%	747	1.83%	PC	39.48%	16,423	17,170	3,726	1,641	1,006	843	–	–	40,809
Ottawa Centre	NDP	NDP	30,311	54.34%	17,715	31.76%	Lib	50.74%	8,773	30,311	12,596	2,718	798	–	140	445	55,781
Ottawa South	Lib	Lib	18,282	45.14%	8,663	21.39%	NDP	42.48%	9,390	9,619	18,282	1,885	675	386	154	109	40,500
Ottawa—Vanier	Lib	Lib	16,132	41.89%	6,106	15.85%	NDP	39.42%	7,798	10,026	16,132	3,019	400	587	–	711	38,673
Ottawa West—Nepean	PC	NDP	15,696	37.54%	1,086	2.60%	PC	47.42%	14,610	15,696	9,384	1,475	–	649	–	–	41,814
Oxford	PC	PC	22,166	50.01%	12,662	28.57%	NDP	46.45%	22,166	9,504	5,457	2,097	1,518	3,579	–	–	44,321
Parkdale—High Park	NDP	NDP	23,024	53.97%	13,477	31.59%	Lib	50.25%	6,270	23,024	9,547	2,587	537	349	–	350	42,664
Parry Sound—Muskoka	PC	PC	20,216	45.37%	2,114	4.74%	Green	53.09%	20,216	3,427	–	18,102	883	1,649	155	126	44,558
Perth—Wellington	PC	PC	19,468	46.80%	10,298	24.76%	NDP	50.09%	19,468	9,170	6,708	2,627	2,457	985	–	182	41,597
Peterborough—Kawartha	PC	PC	20,205	38.58%	4,207	8.03%	Lib	51.47%	20,205	11,196	15,998	1,914	1,088	1,972	–	–	52,373
Pickering—Uxbridge	PC	PC	19,208	44.43%	6,863	15.87%	Lib	45.29%	19,208	6,934	12,345	2,266	543	1,790	–	146	43,232
Renfrew—Nipissing—Pembroke	PC	PC	24,563	61.12%	17,691	44.02%	NDP	46.29%	24,563	6,872	3,928	1,470	1,868	1,162	–	325	40,188
Richmond Hill	PC	PC	16,088	52.24%	6,263	20.34%	Lib	36.14%	16,088	2,805	9,825	917	535	519	–	107	30,796
St. Catharines	NDP	NDP	17,128	39.71%	2,277	5.28%	PC	46.66%	14,851	17,128	7,175	1,764	1,103	613	–	502	43,136
Sarnia—Lambton	PC	PC	21,184	52.72%	11,695	29.11%	NDP	46.69%	21,184	9,489	4,200	1,266	2,719	351	–	972	40,181
Sault Ste. Marie	PC	PC	12,606	46.89%	2,577	9.59%	NDP	44.49%	12,606	10,029	1,610	675	894	–	1,070	–	26,884
Scarborough—Agincourt	PC	PC	14,040	49.03%	3,368	11.76%	Lib	39.43%	14,040	2,512	10,672	628	292	492	–	–	28,636
Scarborough Centre	PC	PC	11,471	35.99%	1,793	5.63%	Lib	41.25%	11,471	8,358	9,678	892	355	297	352	466	31,869
Scarborough—Guildwood	Lib	Lib	13,405	46.31%	4,282	14.79%	PC	41.63%	9,123	4,824	13,405	818	366	265	–	148	28,949
Scarborough North	PC	PC	12,646	48.31%	4,896	18.70%	Lib	39.26%	12,646	4,820	7,750	479	277	105	–	100	26,177
Scarborough—Rouge Park	PC	PC	15,989	45.28%	6,205	17.57%	Lib	45.12%	15,989	7,742	9,784	850	285	523	–	139	35,312
Scarborough Southwest	NDP	NDP	16,842	47.68%	7,092	20.08%	PC	44.34%	9,750	16,842	6,556	1,251	383	320	110	114	35,326
Simcoe—Grey	PC	PC	27,067	51.18%	15,380	29.08%	Lib	43.52%	27,067	5,849	11,687	4,742	2,147	1,039	–	355	52,886
Simcoe North	PC	PC	23,041	49.80%	14,833	32.06%	NDP	46.24%	23,041	8,208	8,070	4,071	1,438	1,119	–	318	46,265
Spadina—Fort York	NDP	NDP	15,595	46.06%	6,132	18.11%	Lib	34.35%	6,221	15,595	9,463	1,902	581	–	–	95	33,857
Stormont—Dundas—South Glengarry	PC	PC	20,766	57.50%	14,308	39.62%	Lib	41.63%	20,766	4,982	6,458	1,477	1,538	893	–	–	36,114
Sudbury	NDP	NDP	12,013	40.85%	3,494	11.88%	PC	44.60%	8,519	12,013	5,727	1,480	724	353	90	504	29,410
Thornhill	PC	PC	18,395	53.28%	8,148	23.60%	Lib	39.88%	18,395	2,698	10,247	1,155	931	351	361	384	34,522
Thunder Bay—Atikokan	NDP	PC	9,657	36.31%	898	3.38%	NDP	43.09%	9,657	8,759	6,486	781	529	248	–	138	26,598
Thunder Bay—Superior North	Lib	NDP	8,404	34.12%	800	3.25%	PC	43.24%	7,604	8,404	6,966	738	314	338	–	270	24,634
Timiskaming—Cochrane	NDP	NDP	9,735	42.74%	1,711	7.51%	PC	42.61%	8,024	9,735	1,600	1,485	1,181	349	–	405	22,779
Timmins	NDP	PC	9,356	64.81%	5,085	35.22%	NDP	43.54%	9,356	4,271	–	323	421	–	–	66	14,437
Toronto Centre	NDP	NDP	15,285	43.77%	2,465	7.06%	Lib	39.82%	4,245	15,285	12,820	1,784	385	–	–	402	34,921
Toronto—Danforth	NDP	NDP	22,890	55.39%	13,650	33.03%	Lib	49.44%	5,556	22,890	9,240	2,513	515	232	–	378	41,324
Toronto—St. Paul's	NDP	NDP	15,292	36.26%	1,092	2.59%	Lib	48.07%	9,445	15,292	14,200	2,302	473	242	–	225	42,179
University—Rosedale	NDP	NDP	13,961	37.55%	3,789	10.19%	Lib	43.20%	6,535	13,961	10,172	5,904	469	–	–	140	37,181
Vaughan—Woodbridge	PC	PC	19,340	53.78%	6,725	18.70%	Lib	44.03%	19,340	1,927	12,615	694	802	304	–	276	35,958
Waterloo	NDP	NDP	20,615	45.89%	7,439	16.56%	PC	48.41%	13,176	20,615	6,251	3,110	1,178	359	–	233	44,922
Wellington—Halton Hills	PC	PC	25,049	50.61%	17,325	35.00%	NDP	48.38%	25,049	7,724	6,920	7,002	2,548	–	–	250	49,493
Whitby	PC	PC	21,840	47.37%	11,316	25.54%	NDP	44.88%	21,840	10,524	9,556	2,397	903	519	168	197	46,104
Willowdale	PC	PC	14,105	44.66%	2,115	6.70%	Lib	39.84%	14,105	3,253	11,990	1,143	392	338	132	230	31,583
Windsor—Tecumseh	NDP	PC	17,692	45.89%	6,141	15.93%	NDP	40.61%	17,692	11,551	5,598	1,002	786	1,219	524	179	38,551
Windsor West	NDP	NDP	13,395	42.19%	2,184	6.88%	PC	33.62%	11,211	13,395	4,159	879	630	1,478	–	–	31,752
York Centre	PC	PC	12,947	46.03%	3,963	14.09%	Lib	38.94%	12,947	3,935	8,984	799	411	679	–	373	28,128
York—Simcoe	PC	PC	20,789	56.76%	14,470	39.51%	Lib	39.00%	20,789	4,083	6,319	2,691	1,633	698	–	415	36,628
York South—Weston	NDP	PC	11,138	36.60%	796	2.62%	NDP	38.11%	11,138	10,342	7,377	770	345	251	209	–	30,432

= open seat
= turnout is above provincial average
= incumbent re-elected under the same party banner
= incumbent switched allegiance after 2018 election
= other incumbents renominated

=== Comparative analysis for ridings (2022 vs 2018) ===
==== Analytical charts ====
Ternary plots of election results
2018

2022
Electoral districts won identified by PC (blue), Liberal (red), NDP (orange), Green (green) and Independent (grey).
2022 vs 2018

2022 (by winning party)
2022 vs 2018

2022 (by party finishing second)
2022 vs 2018

2022
2022 vs 2018

2022 (by winning party)

==== Turnout, winning shares and swings ====
Summary of riding results by turnout, vote share for winning candidate, and swing (vs 2018) (Note: Summarized from "Data Explorer". Elections Ontario.)
Riding and winning party			Turnout		Vote share (Note: Share won by winning candidate, with difference noted from share achieved by the same party in 2018.)		Swing (Note: Positive indicates improvement to standing of party winning in 2018; negative points to 2018's second-place party being swung to.)	
Riding and winning party			%	Change (pp)	%	Change (pp)	To	Change (pp)
Ajax	PC	Hold	39.96	-14.67	40.69	1.65	PC	7.96
Algoma—Manitoulin	NDP	Hold	42.47	-10.61	45.93	-12.63	PC	-11.83
Aurora—Oak Ridges—Richmond Hill	PC	Hold	38.19	-17.24	53.26	-2.78	Lib	-5.95
Barrie—Innisfil	PC	Hold	39.61	-14.66	50.25	0.28	PC	4.87
Barrie—Springwater—Oro-Medonte	PC	Hold	46.75	-10.31	42.10	-2.64	PC	8.87
Bay of Quinte	PC	Hold	45.91	-10.55	49.30	1.28	PC	6.10
Beaches—East York	Lib	Gain	49.58	-11.58	35.42	8.41	Lib	-11.71
Brampton Centre	PC	Gain	36.67	-13.68	41.36	3.26	PC	-7.48
Brampton East	PC	Gain	36.35	-15.32	44.32	10.82	PC	-13.34
Brampton North	PC	Gain	38.46	-13.12	44.99	8.70	PC	-13.22
Brampton South	PC	Hold	35.81	-14.14	45.38	4.37	PC	9.54
Brampton West	PC	Hold	34.19	-13.48	47.84	8.45	PC	12.90
Brantford—Brant	PC	Hold	42.05	-15.11	44.17	2.17	PC	7.39
Bruce—Grey—Owen Sound	PC	Hold	47.02	-11.37	48.56	-6.14	PC	2.02
Burlington	PC	Hold	51.63	-11.82	42.55	2.10	PC	6.55
Cambridge	PC	Hold	43.22	-11.96	37.03	0.06	PC	5.18
Carleton	PC	Hold	48.79	-13.21	48.15	-3.18	PC	1.82
Chatham-Kent—Leamington	PC	Hold	44.87	-11.92	47.52	-4.40	PC	0.52
Davenport	NDP	Hold	43.30	-12.52	57.06	-3.20	Lib	-1.87
Don Valley East	Lib	Hold	42.37	-12.85	43.86	7.93	Lib	4.41
Don Valley North	PC	Hold	40.76	-13.05	47.41	2.97	Lib	-1.47
Don Valley West	Lib	Hold	49.36	-11.91	44.01	5.12	Lib	2.48
Dufferin—Caledon	PC	Hold	42.07	-14.50	49.67	-3.42	PC	3.08
Durham	PC	Hold	43.71	-16.23	45.85	-1.14	PC	5.97
Eglinton—Lawrence	PC	Hold	46.72	-13.39	42.30	1.92	Lib	-0.30
Elgin—Middlesex—London	PC	Hold	44.78	-14.68	51.08	-4.38	PC	4.74
Essex	PC	Gain	47.21	-8.91	51.10	8.12	PC	-13.90
Etobicoke Centre	PC	Hold	48.55	-13.36	48.59	5.59	PC	3.11
Etobicoke—Lakeshore	PC	Hold	45.28	-13.33	37.48	-0.87	PC	7.05
Etobicoke North	PC	Hold	33.98	-16.60	55.51	3.02	PC	7.64
Flamborough—Glanbrook	PC	Hold	46.91	-13.67	46.20	2.68	PC	7.05
Glengarry—Prescott—Russell	PC	Hold	45.56	-9.85	42.05	1.07	Lib	-3.39
Guelph	Green	Hold	49.39	-11.73	54.45	9.42	Green	5.41
Haldimand—Norfolk	Ind	Gain	48.88	-10.32	35.05	N/A (Note: did not campaign in 2018)	NDP	-6.80
Haliburton—Kawartha Lakes—Brock	PC	Hold	48.14	-11.52	52.31	-4.40	PC	3.19
Hamilton Centre	NDP	Hold	37.94	-10.97	57.26	-7.99	PC	-4.40
Hamilton East—Stoney Creek	PC	Gain	40.95	-12.11	34.60	5.78	PC	-14.80
Hamilton Mountain	NDP	Hold	41.49	-14.68	44.81	-9.77	PC	-5.47
Hamilton West—Ancaster—Dundas	NDP	Hold	48.45	-13.81	40.42	-2.76	PC	-2.36
Hastings—Lennox and Addington	PC	Hold	47.12	-11.99	47.55	-2.71	PC	5.36
Humber River—Black Creek	NDP	Hold	33.15	-14.11	34.49	-2.93	PC	-1.20
Huron—Bruce	PC	Hold	54.16	-9.35	51.97	-0.39	PC	6.13
Kanata—Carleton	PC	Hold	51.38	-10.94	43.61	0.41	PC	2.67
Kenora—Rainy River	PC	Hold	40.21	-13.91	59.57	11.01	PC	14.21
King—Vaughan	PC	Hold	39.79	-15.73	57.31	0.69	Lib	-2.23
Kingston and the Islands	Lib	Gain	46.84	-10.45	37.66	10.14	Lib	-9.07
Kitchener Centre	NDP	Hold	46.21	-12.05	40.59	-2.80	PC	-0.90
Kitchener—Conestoga	PC	Hold	48.88	-11.05	40.03	0.45	PC	4.78
Kitchener South—Hespeler	PC	Hold	42.16	-13.66	39.91	1.05	PC	5.83
Lambton—Kent—Middlesex	PC	Hold	47.28	-13.50	58.81	3.46	PC	8.97
Lanark—Frontenac—Kingston	PC	Hold	50.02	-12.00	50.11	-1.92	PC	3.93
Leeds—Grenville—Thousand Islands and Rideau Lakes	PC	Hold	49.18	-11.04	57.69	-3.58	PC	1.32
London—Fanshawe	NDP	Hold	36.56	-13.10	47.06	-8.62	PC	-5.80
London North Centre	NDP	Hold	42.13	-12.82	39.65	-7.95	PC	-3.69
London West	NDP	Hold	48.62	-11.94	45.13	-10.21	PC	-7.51
Markham—Stouffville	PC	Hold	44.51	-14.34	48.43	0.31	Lib	-4.58
Markham—Thornhill	PC	Hold	39.68	-12.53	48.82	-1.63	Lib	-7.37
Markham—Unionville	PC	Hold	39.12	-15.62	56.42	-6.01	Lib	-9.21
Milton	PC	Hold	42.70	-13.40	43.07	1.40	Lib	-3.76
Mississauga Centre	PC	Hold	38.14	-11.65	43.60	2.74	PC	9.01
Mississauga East—Cooksville	PC	Hold	39.58	-11.89	40.91	-0.24	Lib	-3.68
Mississauga—Erin Mills	PC	Hold	41.70	-13.43	42.15	0.54	PC	8.00
Mississauga—Lakeshore	PC	Hold	46.95	-12.38	45.09	2.76	PC	0.51
Mississauga—Malton	PC	Hold	36.51	-11.86	44.89	5.77	PC	10.45
Mississauga—Streetsville	PC	Hold	42.67	-12.86	45.58	2.05	PC	7.95
Nepean	PC	Hold	45.89	-12.85	39.26	-5.87	PC	1.66
Newmarket—Aurora	PC	Hold	44.42	-14.56	44.97	-2.74	PC	4.20
Niagara Centre	NDP	Hold	43.37	-12.76	39.70	-4.53	PC	-2.32
Niagara Falls	NDP	Hold	43.60	-10.96	48.08	-2.71	PC	-1.78
Niagara West	PC	Hold	53.16	-10.11	44.93	-7.88	PC	0.61
Nickel Belt	NDP	Hold	45.51	-9.91	50.77	-12.73	PC	-10.30
Nipissing	PC	Hold	48.29	-9.96	50.20	0.27	PC	4.44
Northumberland—Peterborough South	PC	Hold	51.72	-12.92	50.93	5.61	PC	8.49
Oakville	PC	Hold	50.29	-12.18	45.44	1.77	Lib	-0.09
Oakville North—Burlington	PC	Hold	46.89	-13.31	47.18	0.77	PC	7.61
Orléans	Lib	Hold	46.59	-16.18	46.26	7.21	Lib	4.88
Oshawa	NDP	Hold	39.48	-15.10	42.07	-2.81	PC	-0.66
Ottawa Centre	NDP	Hold	50.74	-10.47	54.34	8.26	NDP	9.23
Ottawa South	Lib	Hold	42.48	-14.43	45.14	5.51	Lib	5.78
Ottawa—Vanier	Lib	Hold	39.42	-12.05	41.71	-1.15	Lib	1.30
Ottawa West—Nepean	NDP	Gain	47.42	-9.62	37.54	5.06	NDP	-1.47
Oxford	PC	Hold	46.45	-12.79	50.01	-5.72	PC	1.63
Parkdale—High Park	NDP	Hold	50.25	-12.18	53.97	-5.44	PC	-1.07
Parry Sound—Muskoka	PC	Hold	53.09	-6.12	45.37	-2.70	PC	5.82
Perth—Wellington	PC	Hold	50.09	-10.25	46.80	-3.87	PC	2.40
Peterborough—Kawartha	PC	Hold	51.47	-11.28	38.58	0.90	PC	6.64
Pickering—Uxbridge	PC	Hold	45.29	-13.61	44.43	2.23	PC	9.11
Renfrew—Nipissing—Pembroke	PC	Hold	46.29	-13.45	61.12	-8.07	NDP	-4.22
Richmond Hill	PC	Hold	36.14	-16.04	52.24	1.00	Lib	-1.49
St. Catharines	NDP	Hold	46.66	-11.39	39.71	3.09	NDP	1.13
Sarnia—Lambton	PC	Hold	46.69	-14.20	52.72	-0.02	PC	6.86
Sault Ste. Marie	PC	Hold	44.49	-10.00	46.89	4.86	PC	4.15
Scarborough—Agincourt	PC	Hold	39.43	-11.92	49.03	-1.37	Lib	-5.18
Scarborough Centre	PC	Hold	41.25	-11.93	35.99	-2.46	PC	2.34
Scarborough—Guildwood	Lib	Hold	41.63	-11.30	46.31	12.96	Lib	7.29
Scarborough North	PC	Hold	39.26	-11.50	48.31	-2.74	PC	1.62
Scarborough—Rouge Park	PC	Hold	45.12	-10.43	45.28	6.66	PC	10.53
Scarborough Southwest	NDP	Hold	44.34	-11.69	47.68	2.02	NDP	2.82
Simcoe—Grey	PC	Hold	43.52	-13.56	51.18	-4.75	PC	3.12
Simcoe North	PC	Hold	46.24	-12.64	49.80	2.89	PC	6.59
Spadina—Fort York	NDP	Hold	34.35	-19.21	46.06	-3.56	Lib	-3.92
Stormont—Dundas—South Glengarry	PC	Hold	41.63	-12.47	57.50	-4.01	PC	1.91
Sudbury	NDP	Hold	44.60	-9.62	40.85	-7.22	PC	-6.48
Thornhill	PC	Hold	39.88	-16.28	53.28	-7.84	PC	1.83
Thunder Bay—Atikokan	PC	Gain	43.09	-11.65	36.31	13.08	NDP	4.15
Thunder Bay—Superior North	NDP	Gain	43.24	-10.60	34.12	-3.04	NDP	-4.27
Timiskaming—Cochrane	NDP	Hold	42.61	-10.48	42.74	-18.46	PC	-15.63
Timmins	PC	Gain	43.54	-4.58	64.81	35.16	PC	-31.50
Toronto Centre	NDP	Hold	39.82	-14.49	43.77	-9.89	Lib	-9.72
Toronto—Danforth	NDP	Hold	49.44	-12.14	55.39	-8.85	PC	-3.22
Toronto—St. Paul's	NDP	Hold	48.07	-12.64	36.26	0.30	NDP	0.01
University—Rosedale	NDP	Hold	43.20	-13.43	37.55	-12.11	Lib	-8.71
Vaughan—Woodbridge	PC	Hold	44.03	-11.92	53.78	3.29	PC	0.10
Waterloo	NDP	Hold	48.41	-13.38	45.89	-4.65	PC	-1.29
Wellington—Halton Hills	PC	Hold	48.38	-12.73	50.61	-3.39	PC	2.52
Whitby	PC	Hold	44.88	-15.44	47.37	1.57	PC	7.68
Willowdale	PC	Hold	39.84	-10.68	44.66	1.03	Lib	-5.16
Windsor—Tecumseh	PC	Gain	40.61	-7.22	45.89	18.85	PC	-23.65
Windsor West	NDP	Hold	33.62	-9.68	42.19	-9.94	PC	-8.39
York Centre	PC	Hold	38.94	-13.97	46.03	-4.12	PC	2.67
York—Simcoe	PC	Hold	39.00	-15.92	56.76	-0.51	PC	5.88
York South—Weston	PC	Gain	38.11	-11.06	36.60	3.65	PC	-2.87
Kiiwetinoong	NDP	Hold	30.40	-15.40	57.57	7.67	NDP	2.49
Mushkegowuk—James Bay	NDP	Hold	39.40	-14.64	47.18	-4.59	PC	-5.18

==== Changes in party vote shares ====
Share change analysis by party and riding (2022 vs 2018)
Riding	PC		NDP		Liberal		Green	
Riding	%	Change (pp)	%	Change (pp)	%	Change (pp)	%	Change (pp)
Ajax	40.69	1.65	16.69	-14.27	35.98	10.18	3.46	0.96
Algoma—Manitoulin	35.48	11.03	45.93	-12.63	8.71	0.61	3.12	-0.39
Aurora—Oak Ridges—Richmond Hill	53.26	-2.78	7.68	-10.35	30.71	9.12	3.89	1.24
Barrie—Innisfil	50.25	0.28	19.14	-9.46	18.10	5.58	6.32	-0.89
Barrie—Springwater—Oro-Medonte	42.10	-2.64	7.83	-20.38	41.35	27.76	4.30	-7.42
Bay of Quinte	49.30	1.28	20.92	-10.92	18.45	3.56	6.27	2.84
Beaches—East York	18.54	0.10	33.21	-15.00	35.42	8.41	10.22	5.96
Brampton Centre	41.36	3.26	26.66	-11.71	25.01	7.68	3.61	0.47
Brampton East	44.32	10.82	31.05	-15.87	21.12	4.49	1.92	0.56
Brampton North	44.99	8.70	19.81	-17.73	28.77	7.55	2.98	-0.47
Brampton South	45.38	4.37	19.14	-14.70	27.82	8.92	3.59	-0.26
Brampton West	47.84	8.45	20.75	-17.35	26.23	7.76	2.77	0.14
Brantford—Brant	44.17	2.17	28.29	-12.62	12.96	3.41	6.76	2.05
Bruce—Grey—Owen Sound	48.56	-6.14	13.91	-10.18	20.33	8.03	8.85	2.90
Burlington	42.55	2.10	17.64	-11.00	29.42	4.82	6.69	2.21
Cambridge	37.03	0.06	22.19	-10.30	20.70	-2.55	8.98	2.71
Carleton	48.15	-3.18	15.67	-6.83	26.89	7.45	5.48	1.53
Chatham-Kent—Leamington	47.52	-4.40	30.28	-5.43	–	-8.06	3.37	-0.17
Davenport	14.08	-2.01	57.06	-3.20	19.21	0.53	4.82	1.28
Don Valley East	32.19	-0.90	15.51	-11.93	43.86	7.93	4.06	1.52
Don Valley North	47.41	2.97	9.87	-11.00	36.83	5.91	3.72	1.16
Don Valley West	38.65	0.16	9.23	-9.60	44.01	5.12	5.51	2.74
Dufferin—Caledon	49.67	-3.42	10.77	-9.57	18.81	6.35	14.13	1.60
Durham	45.85	-1.14	18.59	-13.07	24.89	8.06	4.02	0.14
Eglinton—Lawrence	42.30	1.92	9.68	-8.46	40.96	2.51	3.85	1.45
Elgin—Middlesex—London	51.08	-4.38	18.21	-13.86	17.40	10.09	4.67	0.82
Essex	51.10	8.12	28.28	-19.67	8.58	3.03	2.03	-1.50
Etobicoke Centre	48.59	5.59	8.61	-9.53	34.05	-0.63	4.49	2.15
Etobicoke—Lakeshore	37.48	-0.87	17.92	-14.97	35.73	11.48	4.75	1.13
Etobicoke North	55.51	3.02	13.11	-12.26	23.44	5.26	2.75	-0.08
Flamborough—Glanbrook	46.20	2.68	22.74	-11.43	20.41	4.97	5.44	0.97
Glengarry—Prescott—Russell	42.05	1.07	8.54	-13.25	39.50	7.85	3.76	0.83
Guelph	20.41	-1.40	8.06	-13.51	13.29	3.17	54.45	9.42
Haldimand—Norfolk	30.49	-26.61	13.89	-13.01	7.33	-1.87	4.05	-0.09
Haliburton—Kawartha Lakes—Brock	52.31	-4.40	15.72	-10.78	13.47	3.57	7.55	3.09
Hamilton Centre	16.47	0.80	57.26	-7.99	13.03	2.15	8.76	3.02
Hamilton East—Stoney Creek	34.60	5.78	27.34	-23.82	21.07	8.99	4.95	0.67
Hamilton Mountain	30.00	1.17	44.81	-9.77	15.57	6.33	5.62	0.48
Hamilton West—Ancaster—Dundas	32.99	1.96	40.42	-2.76	18.18	-1.61	5.37	1.21
Hastings—Lennox and Addington	47.55	-2.71	19.01	-13.43	18.60	6.96	4.54	0.21
Humber River—Black Creek	29.75	-0.54	34.49	-2.93	30.66	2.72	1.86	0.30
Huron—Bruce	51.97	-0.39	16.38	-12.65	18.71	4.78	4.10	0.68
Kanata—Carleton	43.61	0.41	24.24	-4.93	23.42	6.41	5.49	0.20
Kenora—Rainy River	59.57	11.01	19.92	-17.41	11.35	0.77	3.79	0.26
King—Vaughan	57.31	0.69	6.94	-8.45	28.51	5.16	2.70	-0.71
Kingston and the Islands	24.56	-1.52	31.15	-8.00	37.66	10.14	3.28	-3.14
Kitchener Centre	26.67	-0.99	40.59	-2.80	14.72	-5.37	12.80	5.96
Kitchener—Conestoga	40.03	0.45	28.87	-9.11	17.53	3.49	6.16	-0.48
Kitchener South—Hespeler	39.91	1.05	26.43	-10.62	16.32	1.41	11.58	4.05
Lambton—Kent—Middlesex	58.81	3.46	18.84	-14.48	9.58	3.35	3.98	0.69
Lanark—Frontenac—Kingston	50.11	-1.92	20.70	-9.77	15.76	5.11	6.75	1.96
Leeds—Grenville—Thousand Islands and Rideau Lakes	57.69	-3.58	13.57	-6.22	18.12	4.76	6.04	1.25
London—Fanshawe	32.76	2.98	47.06	-8.62	10.37	2.01	3.50	-1.01
London North Centre	30.29	-0.57	39.65	-7.95	20.92	5.21	4.79	0.18
London West	33.85	4.81	45.13	-10.21	12.18	2.27	3.43	-0.31
Markham—Stouffville	48.43	0.31	9.46	-10.96	35.48	9.46	3.94	-0.06
Markham—Thornhill	48.82	-1.63	9.05	-12.28	37.50	13.11	2.55	0.27
Markham—Unionville	56.42	-6.01	7.28	-9.29	30.42	12.40	3.67	1.55
Milton	43.07	1.40	9.70	-12.54	38.75	8.92	4.14	-0.88
Mississauga Centre	43.60	2.74	12.29	-15.27	36.32	10.92	3.52	0.89
Mississauga East—Cooksville	40.91	-0.24	10.83	-11.91	37.35	7.11	3.98	0.52
Mississauga—Erin Mills	42.15	0.54	12.14	-15.46	37.48	12.11	4.28	1.53
Mississauga—Lakeshore	45.09	2.76	8.50	-9.80	36.76	1.73	5.04	2.08
Mississauga—Malton	44.89	5.77	17.71	-15.13	30.45	9.68	4.04	2.25
Mississauga—Streetsville	45.58	2.05	11.99	-13.85	35.48	9.75	2.99	0.18
Nepean	39.26	-5.87	19.34	-9.19	34.46	14.85	3.89	-1.28
Newmarket—Aurora	44.97	-2.74	12.72	-11.13	31.47	8.71	5.62	2.04
Niagara Centre	37.63	0.12	39.70	-4.53	13.33	1.50	4.53	0.84
Niagara Falls	36.43	0.86	48.08	-2.71	8.42	-0.93	2.69	-0.77
Niagara West	44.93	-7.88	20.71	-9.09	19.17	8.65	6.46	0.86
Nickel Belt	29.86	7.87	50.77	-12.73	9.89	1.17	3.00	-0.12
Nipissing	50.20	0.27	28.26	-8.61	13.54	5.61	3.34	0.51
Northumberland—Peterborough South	50.93	5.61	13.12	-11.38	24.94	0.77	5.67	1.14
Oakville	45.44	1.77	6.77	-9.80	37.69	1.95	5.19	1.70
Oakville North—Burlington	47.18	0.77	9.92	-14.46	35.31	10.95	4.30	0.60
Orléans	32.65	-2.55	13.79	-8.15	46.26	7.21	4.55	2.04
Oshawa	40.24	-1.49	42.07	-2.81	9.13	1.23	4.02	0.41
Ottawa Centre	15.73	-0.31	54.34	8.26	22.58	-10.20	4.87	1.35
Ottawa South	23.19	-6.04	23.75	-3.44	45.14	5.51	4.65	1.57
Ottawa—Vanier	20.16	-1.21	25.93	-3.75	41.71	-1.15	7.81	3.73
Ottawa West—Nepean	34.94	2.12	37.54	5.06	22.44	-6.86	3.53	-0.30
Oxford	50.01	-5.72	21.44	-8.98	12.31	5.39	4.73	0.42
Parkdale—High Park	14.70	-3.31	53.97	-5.44	22.38	5.38	6.06	1.40
Parry Sound—Muskoka	45.37	-2.70	7.69	-14.34	–	-8.64	40.63	20.61
Perth—Wellington	46.80	-3.87	22.04	-8.66	16.13	5.32	6.32	0.45
Peterborough—Kawartha	38.58	0.90	21.38	-12.37	30.55	5.96	3.65	0.33
Pickering—Uxbridge	44.43	2.23	16.04	-15.98	28.56	8.16	5.24	1.28
Renfrew—Nipissing—Pembroke	61.12	-8.07	17.10	0.36	9.77	0.02	3.66	0.68
Richmond Hill	52.24	1.00	9.11	-8.16	31.90	3.99	2.98	0.10
St. Catharines	34.43	0.83	39.71	3.09	16.63	-7.90	4.09	0.37
Sarnia—Lambton	52.72	-0.02	23.62	-13.75	10.45	6.03	3.15	-0.50
Sault Ste. Marie	46.89	4.86	37.30	-3.43	5.99	-3.97	2.51	-0.74
Scarborough—Agincourt	49.03	-1.37	8.77	-8.68	37.27	8.98	2.19	0.47
Scarborough Centre	35.99	-2.46	26.23	-7.14	30.37	8.23	2.80	0.48
Scarborough—Guildwood	31.51	-1.62	16.66	-10.96	46.31	12.96	2.83	0.38
Scarborough North	48.31	-2.74	18.41	-5.98	29.61	7.56	1.83	0.24
Scarborough—Rouge Park	45.28	6.66	21.92	-14.40	27.71	6.80	2.41	-0.01
Scarborough Southwest	27.60	-3.62	47.68	2.02	18.56	-0.38	3.54	0.84
Simcoe—Grey	51.18	-4.75	11.06	-10.99	22.10	7.70	8.97	2.09
Simcoe North	49.80	2.89	17.74	-10.29	17.44	-0.26	8.80	2.05
Spadina—Fort York	18.37	-3.41	46.06	-3.56	27.95	4.28	5.62	1.97
Stormont—Dundas—South Glengarry	57.50	-4.01	13.80	-7.83	17.88	5.51	4.09	0.42
Sudbury	28.97	5.73	40.85	-7.22	19.47	-2.95	5.03	0.87
Thornhill	53.28	-7.84	7.82	-11.51	29.68	14.90	3.35	1.14
Thunder Bay—Atikokan	36.31	13.08	32.93	-3.33	24.39	-11.62	2.94	0.23
Thunder Bay—Superior North	30.87	12.91	34.12	-3.04	28.28	-11.59	3.00	0.21
Timiskaming—Cochrane	35.23	12.79	42.74	-18.46	7.02	-1.99	6.52	3.89
Timmins	64.81	35.16	29.58	-27.85	–	-8.81	2.24	0.49
Toronto Centre	12.16	-1.96	43.77	-9.89	36.71	9.56	5.11	1.99
Toronto—Danforth	13.44	-2.41	55.39	-8.85	22.36	8.29	6.08	1.70
Toronto—St. Paul's	22.39	-3.90	36.26	0.30	33.67	0.27	5.46	2.23
University—Rosedale	17.58	-3.53	37.55	-12.11	27.36	5.30	15.88	10.51
Vaughan—Woodbridge	53.78	3.29	5.36	-9.20	35.08	3.08	1.93	-0.33
Waterloo	29.33	-2.08	45.89	-4.65	13.92	1.75	6.92	2.09
Wellington—Halton Hills	50.61	-3.39	15.61	-8.42	13.98	1.20	14.15	5.51
Whitby	47.37	1.57	22.83	-13.78	20.73	7.85	5.20	1.81
Willowdale	44.66	1.03	10.30	-15.49	37.96	11.36	3.62	1.33
Windsor—Tecumseh	45.89	18.85	29.96	-28.44	14.52	6.39	2.60	-1.82
Windsor West	35.31	6.84	42.19	-9.94	13.10	-1.61	2.77	-0.81
York Centre	46.03	-4.12	13.99	-9.45	31.94	10.54	2.84	0.55
York—Simcoe	56.76	-0.51	11.15	-12.28	17.25	3.66	7.35	2.52
York South—Weston	36.60	3.65	33.98	-2.09	24.24	-3.59	2.53	-0.01
Kiiwetinoong	29.94	2.69	57.57	7.67	5.90	-9.28	3.32	-2.95
Mushkegowuk—James Bay	35.75	5.78	47.18	-4.59	11.74	-2.54	1.94	0.15

=== Post-election pendulum ===
The robustness of the margins of victory for each party can be summarized in electoral pendulums. These are not necessarily a measure of the volatility of the respective riding results. The following tables show the margins over the various 2nd-place contenders, for which one-half of the value represents the swing needed to overturn the result. Actual seat turnovers in the 2022 election are noted for reference.

= seats that turned over in the election

Post-election pendulum - 2022 Ontario general election (Note: Summarized from "Data Explorer". Elections Ontario.) (Note: Summarized from "Statistical Summary by Electoral District: 2022 Provincial General Election". Elections Ontario.) (Note: Summarized from "Summary of Valid Votes Cast for Each Candidate: 2022 Provincial General Election". Elections Ontario.)

PC (83 seats)
Margins 5% or less
Barrie—Springwater—Oro-Medonte	Lib	0.75
Eglinton—Lawrence	Lib	1.33
Etobicoke—Lakeshore	Lib	1.76
Glengarry—Prescott—Russell	Lib	2.55
York South—Weston	NDP	2.62
Thunder Bay—Atikokan	NDP	3.38
Mississauga East—Cooksville	Lib	3.57
Milton	Lib	4.32
Mississauga—Erin Mills	Lib	4.66
Ajax	Lib	4.71
Parry Sound—Muskoka	Grn	4.74
Nepean	Lib	4.80
Margins 5%–10%
Scarborough Centre	Lib	5.63
Willowdale	Lib	6.70
Hamilton East—Stoney Creek	NDP	7.26
Mississauga Centre	Lib	7.28
Oakville	Lib	7.75
Peterborough—Kawartha	Lib	8.03
Mississauga—Lakeshore	Lib	8.33
Sault Ste. Marie	NDP	9.59
Margins 10%–20%
Mississauga—Streetsville	Lib	10.10
Don Valley North	Lib	10.58
Kitchener—Conestoga	NDP	11.16
Markham—Thornhill	Lib	11.32
Scarborough—Agincourt	Lib	11.76
Oakville North—Burlington	Lib	11.87
Markham—Stouffville	Lib	12.95
Burlington	Lib	13.13
Brampton East	NDP	13.27
Kitchener South—Hespeler	NDP	13.48
Newmarket—Aurora	Lib	13.49
York Centre	Lib	14.09
Mississauga—Malton	Lib	14.44
Etobicoke Centre	Lib	14.54
Brampton Centre	NDP	14.70
Cambridge	NDP	14.83
Pickering—Uxbridge	Lib	15.87
Brantford—Brant	NDP	15.88
Windsor—Tecumseh	NDP	15.93
Brampton North	Lib	16.22
Chatham-Kent—Leamington	NDP	17.25
Brampton South	Lib	17.56
Scarborough—Rouge Park	Lib	17.57
Scarborough North	Lib	18.70
Vaughan—Woodbridge	Lib	18.70
Kanata—Carleton	NDP	19.37
Margins > 20%
Richmond Hill	Lib	20.34
Durham	Lib	20.96
Carleton	Lib	21.26
Brampton West	Lib	21.60
Nipissing	NDP	21.94
Aurora—Oak Ridges—Richmond Hill	Lib	22.55
Essex	NDP	22.82
Flamborough—Glanbrook	NDP	23.46
Thornhill	Lib	23.60
Niagara West	NDP	24.22
Perth—Wellington	NDP	24.76
Whitby	NDP	25.54
Northumberland—Peterborough South	Lib	25.99
Markham—Unionville	Lib	26.00
Bruce—Grey—Owen Sound	Lib	28.23
Bay of Quinte	NDP	28.38
Hastings—Lennox and Addington	NDP	28.54
Oxford	NDP	28.57
King—Vaughan	Lib	28.81
Simcoe—Grey	Lib	29.08
Sarnia—Lambton	NDP	29.11
Lanark—Frontenac—Kingston	NDP	29.41
Dufferin—Caledon	Lib	30.86
Barrie—Innisfil	NDP	31.11
Simcoe North	NDP	32.06
Etobicoke North	Lib	32.07
Elgin—Middlesex—London	NDP	32.87
Huron—Bruce	Lib	33.26
Wellington—Halton Hills	NDP	35.00
Timmins	NDP	35.22
Haliburton—Kawartha Lakes—Brock	NDP	36.59
York—Simcoe	Lib	39.51
Leeds—Grenville—Thousand Islands and Rideau Lakes	Lib	39.56
Stormont—Dundas—South Glengarry	Lib	39.62
Kenora—Rainy River	NDP	39.65
Lambton—Kent—Middlesex	NDP	39.97
Renfrew—Nipissing—Pembroke	NDP	44.02

NDP (31 seats)
Margins 5% or less
Oshawa	PC	1.83
Niagara Centre	PC	2.07
Toronto—St. Paul's	Lib	2.59
Ottawa West—Nepean	PC	2.60
Thunder Bay—Superior North	PC	3.25
Humber River—Black Creek	Lib	3.83
Margins 5%–10%
St. Catharines	PC	5.28
Windsor West	PC	6.88
Toronto Centre	Lib	7.06
Hamilton West—Ancaster—Dundas	PC	7.43
Timiskaming—Cochrane	PC	7.51
London North Centre	PC	9.36
Margins 10%–20%
University—Rosedale	Lib	10.19
Algoma—Manitoulin	PC	10.45
London West	PC	11.27
Mushkegowuk—James Bay	PC	11.43
Niagara Falls	PC	11.65
Sudbury	PC	11.88
Kitchener Centre	PC	13.91
London—Fanshawe	PC	14.30
Hamilton Mountain	PC	14.81
Waterloo	PC	16.56
Spadina—Fort York	Lib	18.11
Margins > 20%
Scarborough Southwest	PC	20.08
Nickel Belt	PC	20.91
Kiiwetinoong	PC	27.63
Parkdale—High Park	Lib	31.59
Ottawa Centre	Lib	31.76
Toronto—Danforth	Lib	33.03
Davenport	Lib	37.85
Hamilton Centre	PC	40.79
Liberal (8 seats)
Beaches—East York	NDP	2.21
Don Valley West	PC	5.36
Kingston and the Islands	NDP	6.51
Don Valley East	PC	11.66
Orléans	PC	13.61
Scarborough—Guildwood	PC	14.79
Ottawa—Vanier	NDP	15.85
Ottawa South	NDP	21.39
Green (1 seat)
Guelph	PC	34.05
Independent (1 seat)
Haldimand—Norfolk	PC	4.56

=== Results summary by region ===
Distribution of seats and popular vote %, by party by region (2022)
Region	Seats					Vote share (%)						Change (pp)						
Region	PC	NDP	Lib	Grn	Ind	PC	NDP	Lib	Grn	NB	Ont	PC	NDP	Lib	Grn	NB	Ont	Major swing
Central Ontario	10	–	–	–	–	48.86	14.28	22.46	7.57	3.11	3.10	+3.01	-14.64	+5.03	+1.29	+3.11	+3.10	→ 9.84
Eastern Ontario	7	–	1	–	–	48.03	18.38	22.52	4.80	2.87	2.89	-2.54	-8.63	+5.76	+0.59	+2.87	+2.69	→ 7.15
Greater Toronto Area (905)	24	1	–	–	–	46.95	15.18	30.01	3.74	2.37	1.22	+1.15	-12.29	+8.10	+0.75	+2.37	+1.22	→ 10.20
Hamilton, Halton and Niagara	7	6	–	–	–	38.68	28.60	22.46	5.15	2.52	1.67	-0.29	-9.11	+5.23	+0.85	+2.52	+1.67	→ 7.17
Midwestern Ontario	8	2	–	1	1	38.84	23.48	14.66	12.65	5.01	1.80	-3.33	-9.90	+1.74	+2.84	+5.01	+1.61	→ 7.45
Northeastern Ontario	4	5	–	–	–	40.90	33.92	8.27	10.78	3.26	1.64	+7.37	-11.27	-4.22	+4.92	+3.26	+1.64	→ 9.32
Northwest Ontario	2	2	–	–	–	39.21	32.06	21.59	3.17	1.93	1.20	+11.76	-5.73	-8.48	-0.01	+1.93	+1.20	→ 10.12
Ottawa	3	2	3	–	–	32.08	27.34	32.55	5.00	1.58	0.91	-1.82	-2.62	+2.40	+1.11	+1.58	+0.82	→ 2.51
Southwestern Ontario	6	4	–	–	–	44.19	32.00	11.83	3.44	3.76	3.69	+4.70	-13.86	+2.53	-0.41	+3.76	+3.69	→ 9.28
Toronto	12	9	4	–	–	32.22	27.94	31.86	4.85	1.41	0.84	-2.55	-7.14	+6.53	+1.52	+1.41	+0.84	→ 6.84
Total	83	31	8	1	1	40.83	23.74	23.91	5.96	2.71	1.78	+0.33	-9.85	+4.33	+1.35	+2.71	+1.74	→ 7.09

=== Detailed results ===
Election results for the 43rd Parliament of Ontario (2022)
Political party	Party leader	MPPs					Votes			
Political party	Party leader	Candidates	2018	Dissol.	2022	±	#	#±	%	± (pp)
Progressive Conservative	Doug Ford	124	76	67	83	7▲	1,919,905	406,618▼	40.83%	0.64▲
Liberal	Steven Del Duca	121	7	7	8	1▲	1,124,065	281▼	23.91%	4.49▲
New Democratic	Andrea Horwath	124	40	38	31	9▼	1,116,383	813,583▼	23.74%	9.60▼
Green	Mike Schreiner	124	1	1	1	1	280,006	15,487▲	5.96%	1.39▲
Independents and no affiliation		40	–	6	1	1▲	25,332	17,106▲	0.54%	0.40▲
New Blue	Jim Karahalios	123	New	1	–	–	127,462	New	2.71%	New
Ontario Party	Derek Sloan	105	–	1	–	–	83,618	81,302▲	1.78%	1.74▲
None of the Above	Greg Vezina	28	–	–	–	–	6,202	9,944▼	0.13%	0.15▼
Libertarian	Mark Snow	16	–	–	–	–	5,242	37,580▼	0.11%	0.63▼
Populist	Jim Torma	13	New	–	–	–	2,638	New	0.06%	New
Freedom	Paul McKeever	11	–	–	–	–	2,103	462▼	0.04%	–
Communist	Drew Garvie	12	–	–	–	–	2,100	629▲	0.04%	0.01▲
Consensus Ontario	Brad Harness	11	–	–	–	–	1,651	1,031▼	0.04%	0.01▼
Moderate	Yuri Duboisky	17	–	–	–	–	1,618	581▼	0.03%	0.01▼
Canadians' Choice Party	Bahman Yazdanfar	2	–	–	–	–	568	671▼	0.01%	0.01▼
Confederation of Regions	Murray Reid	3	–	–	–	–	414	28▲	0.01%	–
People's Political Party	Troy Young	3	–	–	–	–	409	219▼	0.01%	–
People's Progressive Common Front	Raymond Samuels	3	New	–	–	–	367	New	0.01%	New
Stop the New Sex-Ed Agenda	Queenie Yu	3	–	–	–	–	340	738▼	0.01%	0.01▼
Centrist Party	Mansoor Qureshi	2	New	–	–	–	295	New	0.01%	New
Special Needs	Lionel Poizner	2	–	–	–	–	290	341▼	0.01%	–
Northern Ontario	Trevor Holliday	2	–	–	–	–	283	5,629▼	0.01%	0.09▼
Public Benefit Party	Kathleen Ann Sayer	2	New	–	–	–	196	New	–	New
Electoral Reform Party	Peter House	2	New	–	–	–	182	New	–	New
Freedom of Choice, Peace & Justice Party	Lilya Eklishaeva	2	New	–	–	–	182	New	–	New
Ontario Alliance	Joshua E. Eriksen	2	–	–	–	–	108	694▼	–	0.01▼
Vacant				3						
Total		897	124				4,701,959	1,042,901▼	100.00%	
Rejected, unmarked and declined ballots							30,517	30,909▼		
Turnout							4,732,476	1,073,810▼		
Registered voters / turnout %							10,740,426		44.06%	12.61▼

=== Summary analysis ===
Party candidates in 2nd place
Party in 1st place	Party in 2nd place				Total
Party in 1st place	PC	NDP	Liberal	Grn	Total
Progressive Conservative		33	49	1	83
New Democratic	22		9		31
Liberal	4	4			8
Green	1				1
Independent	1				1
Total	28	37	58	1	124

Principal races, according to 1st and 2nd-place results
Parties		Seats
█ Progressive Conservative	█ New Democratic	55
█ Progressive Conservative	█ Liberal	53
█ Progressive Conservative	█ Green	2
█ New Democratic	█ Liberal	13
█ Independent	█ Progressive Conservative	1
Total		124

Candidates ranked 1st to 5th place, by party
Parties	1st	2nd	3rd	4th	5th	Total
█ Progressive Conservative	83	28	13			124
█ New Democratic	31	37	54	2		124
█ Liberal	8	58	53	2		121
█ Green	1	1	2	93	24	121
█ Independent	1			2		3
█ New Blue			1	16	80	97
█ Ontario Party			1	9	17	27
█ Confederation of Regions					1	1
█ Libertarian					1	1
█ None of the Above					1	1

=== Most marginal 2-way and 3-way contests ===
Top 10 marginal 2-way contests (2022)
Riding	1st	2nd	1st vs 2nd
Barrie—Springwater—Oro-Medonte	42.10%	41.35%	0.75%
Eglinton—Lawrence	42.30%	40.96%	1.34%
Etobicoke—Lakeshore	37.48%	35.72%	1.76%
Oshawa	42.07%	40.24%	1.83%
Niagara Centre	39.70%	37.63%	2.07%
Beaches—East York	35.42%	33.21%	2.21%
Glengarry—Prescott—Russell	42.05%	39.50%	2.55%
Toronto—St. Paul's	36.25%	33.66%	2.59%
Ottawa West—Nepean	37.54%	34.94%	2.60%
York South—Weston	36.60%	33.98%	2.62%

Top 10 marginal 3-way contests (2022)
Riding	1st	2nd	3rd	1st vs 3rd
Humber River—Black Creek	34.49%	30.66%	29.75%	4.74%
Thunder Bay—Superior North	34.12%	30.87%	28.28%	5.84%
Scarborough Centre	36.00%	30.37%	26.23%	9.77%
Thunder Bay—Atikokan	36.31%	32.93%	24.39%	11.92%
York South—Weston	36.60%	33.98%	24.24%	12.36%
Kingston and the Islands	37.66%	31.15%	24.56%	13.10%
Hamilton East—Stoney Creek	34.60%	27.34%	21.08%	13.52%
Toronto—St. Paul's	36.25%	33.67%	22.39%	13.86%
Ottawa West—Nepean	37.54%	34.94%	22.44%	15.10%
Cambridge	37.03%	22.19%	20.70%	16.33%

=== Significant results among independent and minor party candidates ===
Those candidates not belonging to a major party, receiving more than 1,000 votes in the election, are listed below:

Riding	Party	Candidates	Votes	Placed
Haldimand—Norfolk	█ Independent	Bobbi Ann Brady	15,921	1st
Hamilton East—Stoney Creek	█ Independent	Paul Miller	2,411	4th
Sault Ste. Marie	█ Independent	Naomi Sayers	1,070	4th

=== Seats changing hands ===
Of the 124 seats, 26 were open because of MPPs who chose not to stand for reelection, and voters in only 14 seats changed allegiance from the previous election in 2018.

Elections to the 43rd Legislative Assembly of Ontario – seats won/lost by party, 2018–2022
Party	2018	Gain from (loss to)										2022
Party	2018	PC		NDP		Lib		Grn		Ind		2022
Progressive Conservative	76			9	(1)						(1)	83
New Democratic	40	1	(9)			1	(2)					31
Liberal	7			2	(1)							8
Green	1											1
Independent	–	1										1
Total	124	2	(9)	11	(2)	1	(2)	–	–	–	(1)	124

There were 14 seats that changed allegiance in the election:

NDP to PC (9)

- Brampton Centre
- Brampton East
- Brampton North
- Essex
- Hamilton East—Stoney Creek
- Thunder Bay—Atikokan
- Timmins
- Windsor—Tecumseh
- York South—Weston

NDP to Liberal (2)

- Beaches—East York
- Kingston and the Islands

Liberal to NDP (1)

- Thunder Bay—Superior North

PC to NDP (1)

- Ottawa West—Nepean

PC to Independent (1)

- Haldimand—Norfolk

Of the 14 seats that changed hands, seven were open seats where the MPPs chose to retire, and seven others saw their incumbents defeated.

Open seats taken by candidates of other parties (2022)
Riding	Party	Candidate	Incumbent retiring from the House	Won by	Party
Beaches—East York	█ New Democratic	Kate Dupuis	Rima Berns-McGown	Mary-Margaret McMahon	█ Liberal
Brampton North	█ New Democratic	Sandeep Singh	Kevin Yarde (Note: sat as an independent at dissolution)	Graham McGregor	█ Progressive Conservative
Essex	█ New Democratic	Ron LeClair	Taras Natyshak	Anthony Leardi	█ Progressive Conservative
Haldimand—Norfolk	█ Progressive Conservative	Ken Hewitt	Toby Barrett	Bobbi Ann Brady	█ Independent
Kingston and the Islands	█ New Democratic	Mary Rita Holland	Ian Arthur	Ted Hsu	█ Liberal
Thunder Bay—Superior North	█ Liberal	Shelby Ch’ng	Michael Gravelle	Lise Vaugeois	█ New Democratic
Windsor—Tecumseh	█ New Democratic	Gemma Grey-Hall	Percy Hatfield	Andrew Dowie	█ Progressive Conservative

Incumbent MPPs defeated (2022)
Constituency	Party	Name	Year elected	Seat held by party since	Defeated by	Party
Brampton Centre	█ New Democratic	Sara Singh	2018	2018	Charmaine Williams	█ Progressive Conservative
Brampton East	█ New Democratic	Gurratan Singh	2018	2018	Hardeep Grewal	█ Progressive Conservative
Hamilton East—Stoney Creek	█ New Democratic	Paul Miller (Note: chose to stand as an independent in the election)	2007	2007	Neil Lumsden	█ Progressive Conservative
Ottawa West—Nepean	█ Progressive Conservative	Jeremy Roberts	2018	2018	Chandra Pasma	█ New Democratic
Thunder Bay—Atikokan	█ New Democratic	Judith Monteith-Farrell	2018	2018	Kevin Holland	█ Progressive Conservative
Timmins	█ New Democratic	Gilles Bisson	1990	1990	George Pirie	█ Progressive Conservative
York South—Weston	█ New Democratic	Faisal Hassan	2018	2018	Michael Ford	█ Progressive Conservative

Three PC MPPs had changed allegiance during the course of the past Legislature, but failed to secure reelection under their new banners. The seats reverted to the PCs.

Constituency	Party (2018)	Party (at dissolution)	Name	Year elected	Changed allegiance	Defeated by	Party
Cambridge	█ Progressive Conservative	█ New Blue	Belinda Karahalios	2018	2020	Brian Riddell	█ Progressive Conservative
Chatham-Kent—Leamington	█ Progressive Conservative	█ Ontario Party	Rick Nicholls	2011	2021	Trevor Jones	█ Progressive Conservative
Glengarry—Prescott—Russell	█ Progressive Conservative	█ Liberal	Amanda Simard	2018	2020	Stéphane Sarrazin	█ Progressive Conservative

Resulting composition of the 43rd Legislative Assembly of Ontario
Source		Party					
Source		PC	NDP	Lib	Grn	Ind	Total
Seats retained	Incumbents returned	55	28	4	1		88
Seats retained	Open seats held	16	1	2			19
Seats retained	Ouster of incumbents changing affiliation	3					3
Seats changing hands	Incumbents defeated	6	1				7
Seats changing hands	Open seats gained	3	1	2		1	7
Total		83	31	8	1	1	124

== Student Vote results ==
Student Vote elections are mock elections that run parallel to real elections, in which students not of voting age participate. They are administered by CIVIX Canada, in partnership with Elections Ontario. Student Vote elections are for educational purposes and do not count towards the actual results.

Summary of the 2022 Ontario Student Vote
Party	Leader	Seats			Votes		
Party	Leader	Elected	2018	±	#	%	Change
New Democratic	Andrea Horwath	75	68	▲7	69,709	28.72%	▼3.63
Liberal	Steven Del Duca	28	10	▲18	53,269	21.95%	▲3.16
Progressive Conservative	Doug Ford	17	45	▼28	55,372	18.69%	▼8.02
Green	Mike Schreiner	4	2	▲2	38,745	15.96%	▲2.99
New Blue	Jim Karahalios	0	0	0	13,563	5.59%	New
Ontario Party	Derek Sloan	0	0	0	9,575	3.95%	New
Others		0	0	0	12,468	5.14%	▼3.94
Valid votes					230,233	—N/a	—N/a
Rejected ballots					-	—N/a	—N/a
Total votes cast		124	124	Steady	230,233	—N/a	—N/a

== See also ==
- 2021 Canadian federal election in Ontario
