= Hardeep Grewal =

Canadian politician

Hardeep Grewal MPP
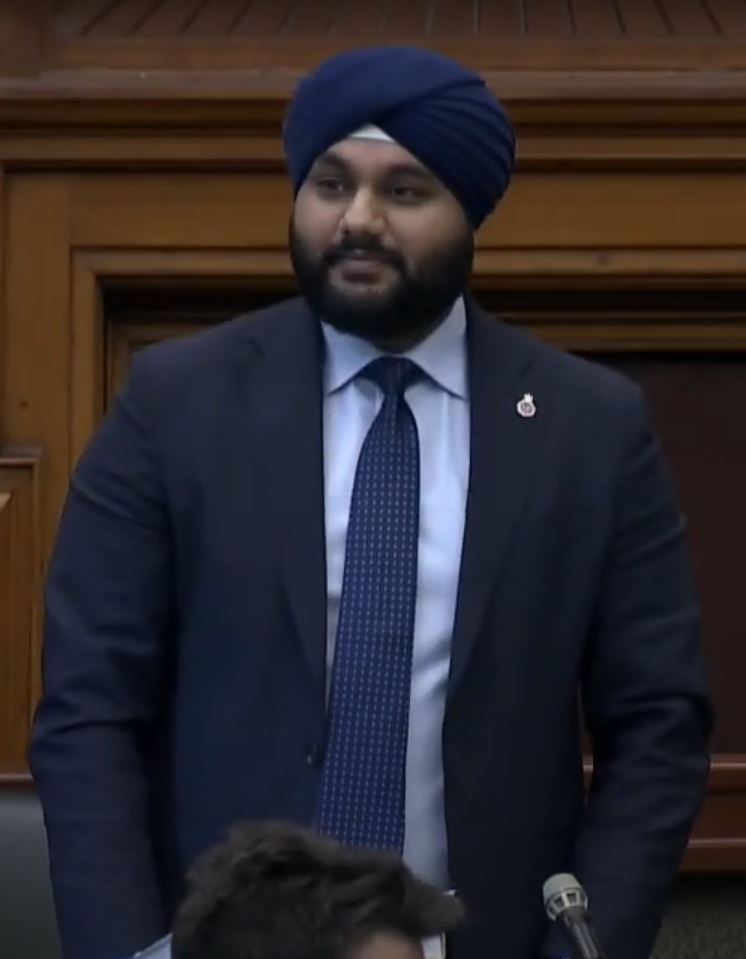
- Grewal in 2022

Member of the Ontario Provincial Parliament for Brampton East
- Incumbent
- Assumed office June 2, 2022
- Preceded by: Gurratan Singh

Personal details
- Party: Progressive Conservative
- Website: https://hardeepgrewalmpp.ca/

Hardeep Singh Grewal is a Canadian politician who is the member of Provincial Parliament (MPP) for Brampton East in the Legislative Assembly of Ontario. A member of the Ontario Progressive Conservative (PC) Party, Grewal was elected in the 2022 provincial election.

== Political career ==
In the Legislative Assembly of Ontario, he is parliamentary assistant to the minister of transportation and a member of the Standing Committee on Heritage, Infrastructure and Cultural Policy.

=== Expense scrutiny ===
==== Hotel expenses ====
In July 2026, Global News reported that Grewal was one of several PC MPPs who had expensed the Legislative Assembly of Ontario to stay at hotels in Toronto.

Grewal spent $27,275 of taxpayer money to stay at hotels in Toronto between 2023 and 2025, expensing the highest amount of any MPP in Ontario.

The Ontario legislature policy only permits MPPs who live within 50 kilometres from Queen's Park to claim hotel expenses in "special circumstances when they cannot make it home due to a severe weather event, such as a snowstorm."

==== Ad purchase in family newspaper ====
On July 20, 2026, Global News further reported that Grewal had used his taxpayer-funded constituency office budget to purchase advertisements in the Punjabi Post, a local newspaper owned by his father.

New Democratic Party (NDP) leader Marit Stiles initiated a complaint to the Office of the Integrity Commissioner, alleging that Grewal "used taxpayer money from his Legislature budget to purchase services from a business solely owned by an immediate family member", violating the Member’s Integrity Act, 1994. As part of a statement to Global News, Grewal wrote "Prior to advertising, I should have consulted with the Integrity Commissioner and have since reached out to her office for advice."

== Electoral history ==
2025 Ontario general election: Brampton East
Party	Candidate	Votes	%	±%	Expenditures
Progressive Conservative	Hardeep Grewal	14,759	51.77	+7.45	$81,742
Liberal	Vicky Dhillon	8,511	29.86	+8.74	$27,477
New Democratic	Martin Singh	3,104	10.89	–20.16	$23,206
Independent	Azad Goyat	1,376	4.83	N/A	$9,931
Green	Nancy Porteous	757	2.66	+0.74	$0
Total valid votes/expense limit		28,507	99.09	–0.18	$133,063
Total rejected, unmarked, and declined ballots		262	0.91	+0.18	
Turnout		28,769	35.23	–1.12	
Eligible voters		81,652			
Progressive Conservative hold		Swing		–0.65	
Source: Elections Ontario

2022 Ontario general election: Brampton East
Party	Candidate	Votes	%	±%	Expenditures
Progressive Conservative	Hardeep Grewal	12,869	44.32	+10.82	$92,593
New Democratic	Gurratan Singh	9,017	31.05	−15.87	$85,968
Liberal	Jannat Garewal	6,131	21.12	+4.49	$17,306
Green	Jamaal Blackwood	557	1.92	+0.56	$2,165
New Blue	Michael Bayer	295	1.02		$0
Ontario Party	Paul Stark	167	0.58		$0
Total valid votes/expense Limit		29,036	99.27	-0.07	$112,648
Total rejected, unmarked, and declined ballots		213	0.73	+0.07	
Turnout		29,249	36.35		
Eligible voters		79,559			
Progressive Conservative gain from New Democratic		Swing		+13.34	
Source(s): "Summary of Valid Votes Cast for Each Candidate" (PDF). Elections Ontario. 2022. Archived from the original on 2023-05-18.; "Statistical Summary by Electoral District" (PDF). Elections Ontario. 2022. Archived from the original on 2023-05-21.
