= Gurratan Singh =

Canadian politician

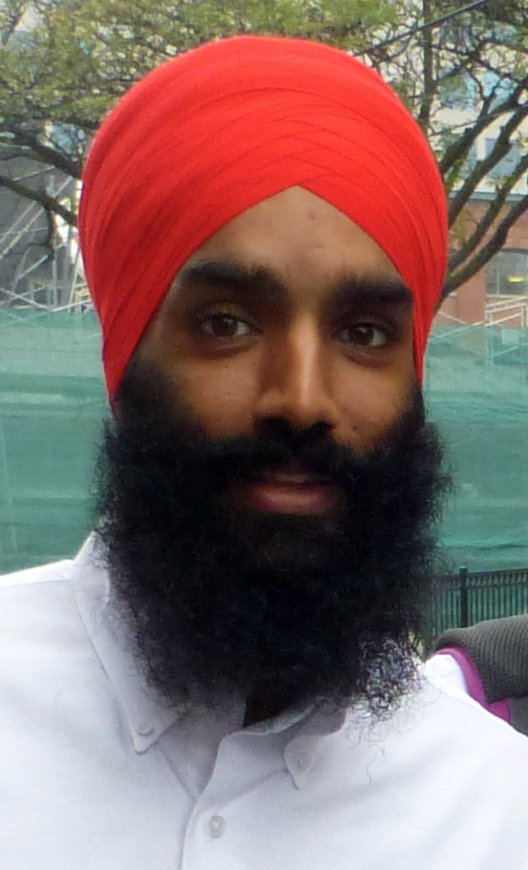
- Singh in 2021

Member of Provincial Parliament for Brampton East
- In office June 7, 2018 – May 3, 2022
- Preceded by: Riding established
- Succeeded by: Hardeep Grewal

Personal details
- Born: May 13, 1984 (age 42) St. John's, Newfoundland, Canada
- Party: Ontario New Democratic
- Spouse: Satvir Kaur Lachhar (m. 2018)
- Children: 2
- Relatives: Jagmeet Singh (brother)
- Education: McMaster University; York University
- Occupation: Politician; lawyer

Gurratan Singh (born May 13, 1984) is a Canadian lawyer and former politician who represented Brampton East in the Legislative Assembly of Ontario from 2018 to 2022. A member of the Ontario New Democratic Party (NDP), Singh practiced as a litigation lawyer before he was elected as a member of Provincial Parliament (MPP) in the 2018 provincial election. Following his time in office, Singh became a consultant and later partner at the conservative-leaning consulting firm Crestview Strategy.

== Early life and education ==
Born on May 13, 1984, in St. John's, Newfoundland and Labrador, Singh is the brother of former federal New Democratic Party leader Jagmeet Singh.

Singh holds an Honours Bachelor of Arts in philosophy and religious studies from McMaster University.

Singh later attended Osgoode Hall Law School at York University and graduated with the degree of Juris Doctor.

== Political career ==
Singh was elected as the MPP for Brampton East in the 2018 provincial election. During the election, Singh ignited controversy when a photo of him holding a poster reading "Fuck the Police" in a 2006 Facebook post surfaced. Singh was defended by NDP leader Andrea Horwath. He also issued a statement apologizing "unreservedly to police officers, their families and the policing community", saying he was "deeply ashamed" of his actions.

Singh ran in the 2022 Ontario general election, however, he was defeated by Progressive Conservative Party candidate Hardeep Grewal.

== Electoral record ==
2022 Ontario general election: Brampton East
Party	Candidate	Votes	%	±%	Expenditures
Progressive Conservative	Hardeep Grewal	12,869	44.32	+10.82	$92,593
New Democratic	Gurratan Singh	9,017	31.05	–15.87	$85,968
Liberal	Jannat Garewal	6,131	21.12	+4.49	$17,306
Green	Jamaal Blackwood	557	1.92	+0.56	$2,165
New Blue	Michael Bayer	295	1.02	–	$0
Ontario Party	Paul Stark	167	0.58	–	$0
Total valid votes/expense Limit		29,036	99.27	–	$112,648
Total rejected, unmarked and declined ballots		213	0.73	+0.07	
Turnout		29,249	36.35	–15.32	
Eligible voters		80,463			
Progressive Conservative gain from New Democratic		Swing		+13.34	
Source: Elections Ontario

2018 Ontario general election
Party	Candidate	Votes	%	±%
New Democratic	Gurratan Singh	18,062	46.92	–6.18
Progressive Conservative	Sudeep Verma	12,896	33.50	+19.57
Liberal	Parminder Singh	6,398	16.62	–14.29
Green	Raquel Fronte	523	1.36	–0.66
Libertarian	Daniele Cerasoli	486	1.26	N/A
Trillium	Gurdeep Dhothar	130	0.34	N/A
Total valid votes		38,495	99.34	
Total rejected, unmarked and declined ballots		256	0.66	
Turnout		38,751	51.67	
Eligible voters		75,002		
New Democratic notional hold		Swing		–12.88
Source: Elections Ontario
