= Brampton East (provincial electoral district) =

Provincial electoral district in Ontario, Canada

Coordinates: 43.783°N 79.710°W

Ontario electoral district
- Location in Brampton

Provincial electoral district
- Legislature: Legislative Assembly of Ontario
MPP
Hardeep Grewal
Progressive Conservative
- District created: 2015
- First contested: 2018
- Last contested: 2025

Demographics
- Population (2016): 122,000
- Electors (2018): 75,002
- Area (km²): 86
- Pop. density (per km²): 1,418.6
- Census division: Peel
- Census subdivision: Brampton

Brampton East is a provincial electoral district in Ontario, Canada. It elects one member to the Legislative Assembly of Ontario. This riding was created in 2015.

== Members of Provincial Parliament ==
Brampton East
| Assembly | Years | Member | Party |
|---|---|---|---|
Riding created from Bramalea—Gore—Malton and Brampton—Springdale
| 42nd | 2018–2022 | Gurratan Singh | New Democratic |
| 43rd | 2022–2025 | Hardeep Grewal | Progressive Conservative |
| 44th | 2025–present | Hardeep Grewal | Progressive Conservative |

== Election results ==
Winning party in each polling division of Brampton East at the 2025 Ontario general election

2025 Ontario general election
| Party | Candidate | Votes | % | ±% | Expenditures |
|---|---|---|---|---|---|
| Progressive Conservative | Hardeep Grewal | 14,759 | 51.77 | +7.45 | $81,742 |
| Liberal | Vicky Dhillon | 8,511 | 29.86 | +8.74 | $27,477 |
| New Democratic | Martin Singh | 3,104 | 10.89 | –20.16 | $23,206 |
| Independent | Azad Goyat | 1,376 | 4.83 | N/A | $9,931 |
| Green | Nancy Porteous | 757 | 2.66 | +0.74 | $0 |
| Total valid votes/expense limit | | 28,507 | 99.09 | –0.18 | $133,063 |
| Total rejected, unmarked, and declined ballots | | 262 | 0.91 | +0.18 | |
| Turnout | | 28,769 | 35.23 | –1.12 | |
| Eligible voters | | 81,652 | | | |
| Progressive Conservative hold | | Swing | | –0.65 | |
Source: Elections Ontario

Winning party in each polling division of Brampton East at the 2022 Ontario general election

2022 Ontario general election
| Party | Candidate | Votes | % | ±% | Expenditures |
|---|---|---|---|---|---|
| Progressive Conservative | Hardeep Grewal | 12,869 | 44.32 | +10.82 | $92,593 |
| New Democratic | Gurratan Singh | 9,017 | 31.05 | −15.87 | $85,968 |
| Liberal | Jannat Garewal | 6,131 | 21.12 | +4.49 | $17,306 |
| Green | Jamaal Blackwood | 557 | 1.92 | +0.56 | $2,165 |
| New Blue | Michael Bayer | 295 | 1.02 | | $0 |
| Ontario Party | Paul Stark | 167 | 0.58 | | $0 |
| Total valid votes/expense Limit | | 29,036 | 99.27 | -0.07 | $112,648 |
| Total rejected, unmarked, and declined ballots | | 213 | 0.73 | +0.07 | |
| Turnout | | 29,249 | 36.35 | | |
| Eligible voters | | 79,559 | | | |
| Progressive Conservative gain from New Democratic | | Swing | | +13.34 | |
Source(s): "Summary of Valid Votes Cast for Each Candidate" (PDF). Elections Ontario. 2022. Archived from the original on May 18, 2023.; "Statistical Summary by Electoral District" (PDF). Elections Ontario. 2022. Archived from the original on May 21, 2023.

2018 Ontario general election
| Party | Candidate | Votes | % | ±% |
|---|---|---|---|---|
| New Democratic | Gurratan Singh | 18,062 | 46.92 | –6.18 |
| Progressive Conservative | Sudeep Verma | 12,896 | 33.50 | +19.57 |
| Liberal | Parminder Singh | 6,398 | 16.62 | –14.29 |
| Green | Raquel Fronte | 523 | 1.36 | –0.66 |
| Libertarian | Daniele Cerasoli | 486 | 1.26 | N/A |
| Trillium | Gurdeep Dhothar | 130 | 0.34 | N/A |
| Total valid votes | | 38,495 | 99.34 | |
| Total rejected, unmarked and declined ballots | | 256 | 0.66 | |
| Turnout | | 38,751 | 51.67 | |
| Eligible voters | | 75,002 | | |
| New Democratic notional hold | | Swing | | –12.88 |
Source: Elections Ontario

2014 general election redistributed results
| Party | Vote | % |
|---|---|---|
| New Democratic | 15,358 | 53.10 |
| Liberal | 8,941 | 30.91 |
| Progressive Conservative | 4,029 | 13.93 |
| Green | 583 | 2.02 |
| Others | 10 | 0.03 |

== See also ==
- List of Ontario provincial electoral districts
- Canadian provincial electoral districts
