= Candidates of the 2025 Ontario general election =

2025 election in Ontario, Canada

- February 27, 2025

The following tables list by region the nominated candidates for the 2025 Ontario general election.

== Abbreviations guide ==
Abbreviations of political parties used in these tables:

- All – Ontario Alliance
- CCP – Canadians' Choice Party
- Comm. – Communist Party of Canada (Ontario)
- CPO – Ontario Centrist Party
- ERP – Electoral Reform Party
- FPO – Freedom Party of Ontario
- Green – Green Party of Ontario
- Ind. – Independent
- Liberal – Ontario Liberal Party
- Libert. – Ontario Libertarian Party
- Mod. – Ontario Moderate Party
- N. Ont – Northern Ontario Party
- NB – New Blue Party of Ontario
- NDP – Ontario New Democratic Party
- NOTA – None of the Above Party
- PC – Progressive Conservative Party of Ontario
- PPO – Populist Party Ontario
- Prog. – Progress Party Ontario
- PSN – Party for People with Special Needs
- SNSA – Stop the New Sex-Ed Agenda
- TOP – Ontario Party

== Number of candidates by party ==
Nominated candidates for the 2025 Ontario general election
Party	Leader	Candidates
Ontario Alliance	Joshua E. Eriksen	5
Canadians' Choice Party	Bahman Yazdanfar	2
Ontario Centrist Party	Mansoor Qureshi	5
Communist Party of Canada (Ontario)	Drew Garvie	7
Electoral Reform Party	Peter House	2
Freedom Party of Ontario	Paul McKeever	5
Green Party of Ontario	Mike Schreiner	124
Ontario Liberal Party	Bonnie Crombie	123
Ontario Libertarian Party	Mark Snow	17
Ontario Moderate Party	Yuri Duboisky	12
Northern Ontario Party	Jacques Ouellette	3
New Blue Party of Ontario	Jim Karahalios	108
Ontario New Democratic Party	Marit Stiles	123
None of the Above Party	Greg Vezina	13
Ontario Party	Derek Sloan	44
Progress Party Ontario	Sana Ahmad	2
Progressive Conservative Party of Ontario	Doug Ford	124
Party for People with Special Needs	Lionel Wayne Poizner	2
Populist Party Ontario	Jim Torma	4
Stop the New Sex-Ed Agenda	John Kanary	2
Independent		41
Total		768

== Candidates ==
† = indicates that the incumbent is not seeking re-election
bold indicates party leader
italics = indicates a contestant for nomination or declared interest
~~strikethrough~~ indicates candidate withdrew before the candidate deadline and was not replaced by the party

=== Eastern Ontario ===
Electoral district	Candidates							Incumbent
Electoral district	PC	NDP	Liberal	Green	New Blue	Ontario Party	Other	Incumbent
Bay of Quinte	Tyler Allsopp	Amanda Robertson	Dave O'Neil	Lori Borthwick	Anthony Zambito	Nick Maddison		Tyler Allsopp
Glengarry—Prescott—Russell	Stéphane Sarrazin	Ryder Finlay	Trevor Stewart	Thaila Riden	Felix Labrosse	Brandon Wallingford	Jason St-Louis (Ind.)	Stéphane Sarrazin
Hastings—Lennox and Addington	Ric Bresee	Jessica Zielke	Lynn Rigby	Mike Holbrook	Glenn Tyrrell	**Derek Sloan**		Ric Bresee
Kingston and the Islands	Ian Chapelle	Elliot Goodell Ugalde	Ted Hsu	Zachary Typhair		Allan Wilson	James McNair (NOTA)	Ted Hsu
Lanark—Frontenac—Kingston	John Jordan	John MacRae	Rob Rainer	Marlene Spruyt	David Motton	Wendy Dillistone-Whitaker	Shane O'Neill (Ind.)	John Jordan
Leeds—Grenville—Thousand Islands and Rideau Lakes	Steve Clark	Chris Wilson	Lorna Jean Edmonds	Fiona Jager	Chris Garrah	David Calabretta	**Mark Snow** (Libert.)	Steve Clark
Renfrew—Nipissing—Pembroke	Billy Denault	Marshall Buchanan	Oliver Jacob	Anna Dolan	Mark Dickson	Kevin Holm		John Yakabuski†
Stormont—Dundas—South Glengarry	Nolan Quinn	Jeremy Rose	Devon Monkhouse	Nicholas Lapierre	Stefan Kohut	Brigitte Sugrue		Nolan Quinn

==== Ottawa ====
Electoral district	Candidates							Incumbent
Electoral district	PC	NDP	Liberal	Green	New Blue	Ontario Party	Other	Incumbent
Carleton	George Darouze	Sherin Faili	Brandon Bay	Mystic Plaunt	Rob Stocki	Myles Dear	Bruce Anthony Faulkner (Libert.)	Goldie Ghamari†
Carleton	George Darouze	Sherin Faili	Brandon Bay	Mystic Plaunt	Rob Stocki	Myles Dear	Brian Hull (Ind.)	Goldie Ghamari†
Kanata—Carleton	Scott Phelan	Dave Belcher	Karen McCrimmon	Jennifer Purdy	Elizabeth Watson	Frank Jakubowski		Karen McCrimmon
Nepean	Alex Lewis	Max Blair	Tyler Watt	Sheilagh McLean	John Kovach	Carmen Charbonneau	Peter Westaway (Ind.)	Lisa MacLeod†
Orléans	Stéphan Plourde	Matthew Sévigny	Stephen Blais	Michelle Petersen	Patricia Hooper		Ken Lewis (Libert.)	Stephen Blais
Orléans	Stéphan Plourde	Matthew Sévigny	Stephen Blais	Michelle Petersen	Patricia Hooper		Burthomley Douzable (Ind.)	Stephen Blais
Orléans	Stéphan Plourde	Matthew Sévigny	Stephen Blais	Michelle Petersen	Patricia Hooper		Arabella Vida (Ind.)	Stephen Blais
Ottawa Centre	Scott Healey	Catherine McKenney	Thomas Simpson	Simon Beckett	Maria Desouza	Shannon Boschy	Cashton Perry (Comm.)	Joel Harden†
Ottawa Centre	Scott Healey	Catherine McKenney	Thomas Simpson	Simon Beckett	Maria Desouza	Shannon Boschy	Josh Rachlis (Ind.)	Joel Harden†
Ottawa South	Jan Gao	Morgan Gay	John Fraser	Nira Dookeran	Alex Perrier			John Fraser
Ottawa—Vanier	Marilissa Gosselin	Myriam Djilane	Lucille Collard	Christian Proulx	Rishabh Bhatia		Coreen Corcoran (Libert.)	Lucille Collard
Ottawa West—Nepean	Husien Abu-Rayash	Chandra Pasma	Brett Szmul	Sophia Andrew-Joiner	Rylan Vroom			Chandra Pasma

=== Central Ontario ===
Electoral district	Candidates							Incumbent
Electoral district	PC	NDP	Liberal	Green	New Blue	Libertarian	Other	Incumbent
Barrie—Innisfil	Andrea Khanjin	Andrew Harrigan	Dane Lee	Stephen Ciesielski	Sam Mangiapane		Anna Yuryeva (Mod.)	Andrea Khanjin
Barrie—Springwater—Oro-Medonte	Doug Downey	Tracey Lapham	Rosemary Zacharias	Tim Grant	Alex Della Ventura	Erin Patterson		Doug Downey
Bruce—Grey—Owen Sound	Paul Vickers	James Harris	Selwyn Hicks	Joel Loughead	Vincent Grimaldi	Michael Butt	Ann Gillies (SNSA)	Rick Byers†
Bruce—Grey—Owen Sound	Paul Vickers	James Harris	Selwyn Hicks	Joel Loughead	Vincent Grimaldi	Michael Butt	Matt Fritz (All)	Rick Byers†
Dufferin—Caledon	Sylvia Jones	George Nakitsas	Michael Dehn	Sandy Brown	Kris Eggleton		Alexey Cherkashov (Mod.)	Sylvia Jones
Dufferin—Caledon	Sylvia Jones	George Nakitsas	Michael Dehn	Sandy Brown	Kris Eggleton		Jeffrey Halsall (Ind.)	Sylvia Jones
Haliburton—Kawartha Lakes—Brock	Laurie Scott	Barbara Doyle	Alison Bennie	Tom Regina	Jacquie Barker	Zachary Tisdale	Brian Kerr (TOP)	Laurie Scott
Haliburton—Kawartha Lakes—Brock	Laurie Scott	Barbara Doyle	Alison Bennie	Tom Regina	Jacquie Barker	Zachary Tisdale	Bill Denby (FPO)	Laurie Scott
Haliburton—Kawartha Lakes—Brock	Laurie Scott	Barbara Doyle	Alison Bennie	Tom Regina	Jacquie Barker	Zachary Tisdale	Gene Balfour (Ind.)	Laurie Scott
Northumberland—Peterborough South	David Piccini	Bruce LePage	Dorothy Noronha	Maxwell Groves	Joshua Chalhoub		Florian Bors (TOP)	David Piccini
Peterborough—Kawartha	Dave Smith	Jen Deck	Adam Hopkins	Lucas Graham	Andrew Roudny		Brian Martindale (TOP)	Dave Smith
Simcoe—Grey	Brian Saunderson	Benten Tinkler	Ted Crysler	Allan Kuhn	David Ghobrial			Brian Saunderson
Simcoe North	Jill Dunlop	Jordi Malcolm	Walter Alvarez-Bardales	Christopher Carr	Dave Brunelle	William Joslin		Jill Dunlop
York—Simcoe	Caroline Mulroney	Justin Graham	Fatima Chaudhry	Jennifer Baron	Brent Fellman	Sean Conroy	Alana Hollander (TOP)	Caroline Mulroney
York—Simcoe	Caroline Mulroney	Justin Graham	Fatima Chaudhry	Jennifer Baron	Brent Fellman	Sean Conroy	Franco Colavecchia (Mod.)	Caroline Mulroney

=== 905 Belt ===
==== Durham ====
Electoral district	Candidates							Incumbent
Electoral district	PC	NDP	Liberal	Green	New Blue	Centrist	Other	Incumbent
Ajax	Patrice Barnes	Arthur Augustine	Rob Cerjanec	Cory Feferman	Chris Rees	Sarah Qureshi		Patrice Barnes
Durham	Todd McCarthy	Chris Borgia	Brad Jakobsen	Sanjin Zeco	James Leventakis	Asif Khan	Sheri Thurston (TOP)	Todd McCarthy
Durham	Todd McCarthy	Chris Borgia	Brad Jakobsen	Sanjin Zeco	James Leventakis	Asif Khan	Fawad Kiyani (Ind.)	Todd McCarthy
Oshawa	Jerry Ouelette	Jennifer French	Viresh Bansal	Nicholas Sirgool	Joe Ingino		Rahul Padmini Soumian (Ind.)	Jennifer French
Pickering—Uxbridge	Peter Bethlenfalvy	Khalid Ahmed	Ibrahim Daniyal	Mini Batra	Adrian Nolan	**Mansoor Qureshi**	Victoria Devenport (TOP)	Peter Bethlenfalvy
Pickering—Uxbridge	Peter Bethlenfalvy	Khalid Ahmed	Ibrahim Daniyal	Mini Batra	Adrian Nolan	**Mansoor Qureshi**	Netalia Duboisky (Mod.)	Peter Bethlenfalvy
Whitby	Lorne Coe	Jamie Nye	Roger Gordon	Steven Toman	Ralph Blank			Lorne Coe

==== Brampton and Mississauga ====
Electoral district	Candidates						Incumbent
Electoral district	PC	NDP	Liberal	Green	New Blue	Other	Incumbent
Brampton Centre	Charmaine Williams	Sukhamrit Singh	Martin Medeiros	Pauline Thornham	Kamal Preet Kaur		Charmaine Williams
Brampton East	Hardeep Grewal	Martin Singh	Vicky Dhillon	Nancy Porteous		Azad Goyat (Ind.)	Hardeep Grewal
Brampton North	Graham McGregor	Ruby Zaman	Ranjit Singh Bagga	Sameera Falcon Khan	Melanie Porte		Graham McGregor
Brampton South	Prabmeet Sarkaria	Rajani Sharma	Bhavik Parikh	Rajinder Boyal	Johnny Nolan		Prabmeet Sarkaria
Brampton West	Amarjot Sandhu	Sam Sarjeant	Andrew Kania	Ethan Russell	David Pardy	Pushpek Sidhu (Ind.)	Amarjot Sandhu
Mississauga Centre	Natalia Kusendova	Waseem Ahmed	Sumira Malik	Robert Chan	Audrey Simpson	**Greg Vezina** (NOTA)	Natalia Kusendova
Mississauga Centre	Natalia Kusendova	Waseem Ahmed	Sumira Malik	Robert Chan	Audrey Simpson	Zulfiqar Ali (Ind.)	Natalia Kusendova
Mississauga East—Cooksville	Silvia Gualtieri	Alex Venuto	**Bonnie Crombie**	David Zeni	Kevin Peck	Vittoria Trichilo (TOP)	Kaleed Rasheed†
Mississauga East—Cooksville	Silvia Gualtieri	Alex Venuto	**Bonnie Crombie**	David Zeni	Kevin Peck	Oleksandra Iakovlieva (Mod.)	Kaleed Rasheed†
Mississauga East—Cooksville	Silvia Gualtieri	Alex Venuto	**Bonnie Crombie**	David Zeni	Kevin Peck	Mark De Pelham (Ind.)	Kaleed Rasheed†
Mississauga East—Cooksville	Silvia Gualtieri	Alex Venuto	**Bonnie Crombie**	David Zeni	Kevin Peck	Syed Hussain (Ind.)	Kaleed Rasheed†
Mississauga—Erin Mills	Sheref Sabawy	Mubashir Rizvi	Qasir Dar	Adriane Franklin	Michael Bayer	Sajid Hussain (Ind.)	Sheref Sabawy
Mississauga—Erin Mills	Sheref Sabawy	Mubashir Rizvi	Qasir Dar	Adriane Franklin	Michael Bayer	Michael Matulewicz (Ind.)	Sheref Sabawy
Mississauga—Lakeshore	Rudy Cuzzetto	Spencer Ki	Elizabeth Mendes	Julia Budahazy	Renata Cynarska	Oleksii Avdeiev (Mod.)	Rudy Cuzzetto
Mississauga—Lakeshore	Rudy Cuzzetto	Spencer Ki	Elizabeth Mendes	Julia Budahazy	Renata Cynarska	Ayoub Bumbia (Ind.)	Rudy Cuzzetto
Mississauga—Malton	Deepak Anand	Gerard MacDonald	Jawad Haroon	Arish Esmail	Van Nguyen		Deepak Anand
Mississauga—Streetsville	Nina Tangri	Shoaib Khawar	Jill Promoli	Christopher Hill	Darryl Brothers		Nina Tangri

==== York Region ====
Electoral district	Candidates						Incumbent
Electoral district	PC	NDP	Liberal	Green	New Blue	Other	Incumbent
Aurora—Oak Ridges—Richmond Hill	Michael Parsa	Naila Saeed	Jason Cherniak	Ikram Kahn	Rosaria Wiseman		Michael Parsa
King—Vaughan	Stephen Lecce	Rick Morelli	Gillian Vivona	Ann Raney	Christopher Bressi	Maria Morgis (TOP)	Stephen Lecce
Markham—Stouffville	Paul Calandra	Gregory Hines	Kelly Dunn	Myles O'Brien	Brendan Sorenson		Paul Calandra
Markham—Thornhill	Logan Kanapathi	Paul Sahbaz	Nirmala Armstrong	Shane O'Brien			Logan Kanapathi
Markham—Unionville	Billy Pang	Sameer Qureshi	Jagbir Dosanjh	Chris Madsen	Nick Boudreau		Billy Pang
Newmarket—Aurora	Dawn Gallagher Murphy	Denis Heng	Chris Ballard	David Jakubiec	Shirin Khasbakhi	**Yuri Duboisky** (Mod.)	Dawn Gallagher Murphy
Richmond Hill	Daisy Wai	Raymond Bhushan	Roozbeh Farhadi	Alison Lam	Allison Bruns		Daisy Wai
Thornhill	Laura Smith	Faiz Qureshi	Benjamin Dooley	Marcelo Levy	Luca Mele	Aleksei Polyakov (Mod.)	Laura Smith
Vaughan—Woodbridge	Michael Tibollo	Elif Genc	Hamza Ansari	Philip Piluris	Pasquale Chiarizia	Mario Greco (PPO)	Michael Tibollo

=== Toronto ===
==== Scarborough ====
Electoral district	Candidates						Incumbent
Electoral district	PC	NDP	Liberal	Green	New Blue	Other	Incumbent
Scarborough—Agincourt	Aris Babikian	Francesca Policarpio	Peter Yuen	Stephanie LeBlanc	Johan Yogaretnam	Donahue Morgan (TOP)	Aris Babikian
Scarborough Centre	David Smith	Sonali Chakraborti	Mazhar Shafiq	Dean Boulding	Gus Prokos	Haseeb Qureshi (CPO)	David Smith
Scarborough—Guildwood	Jude Aloysius	Christian Keay	Andrea Hazell	Tara McMahon	Anthony Internicola	Kingsley Cato (Ind.)	Andrea Hazell
Scarborough—Guildwood	Jude Aloysius	Christian Keay	Andrea Hazell	Tara McMahon	Anthony Internicola	Kevin Clarke (Ind.)	Andrea Hazell
Scarborough North	Raymond Cho	Thadsha Navaneethan	Anita Anandarajan	Zdravko Gunjevic			Raymond Cho
Scarborough—Rouge Park	Vijay Thanigasalam	Hibah Sidat	Morris Beckford	Victoria Jewt		Wai Kiat Tang (Comm.)	Vijay Thanigasalam
Scarborough—Rouge Park	Vijay Thanigasalam	Hibah Sidat	Morris Beckford	Victoria Jewt		Tim James (NOTA)	Vijay Thanigasalam
Scarborough Southwest	Aderonke Dramola	Doly Begum	Qadira Jackson	Mark Bekkering			Doly Begum

==== North York ====
Electoral district	Candidates						Incumbent
Electoral district	PC	NDP	Liberal	Green	New Blue	Other	Incumbent
Don Valley East	Roger Gingerich	Frank Chu	Adil Shamji	Joshua Miersch		Krasimir Penkov (Mod.)	Adil Shamji
Don Valley North	Susan Liu	Ebrahim Astaraki	Jonathan Tsao	Andrew Armstrong	Annie Nolan	Vincent Ke (Ind.)	Vincent Ke
Don Valley West	Sam Moini	Linnea Löfström-Abary	Stephanie Bowman	Sheena Sharp	Laurel Hobbs	Bahira Abdulsalam (Ind.)	Stephanie Bowman
Eglinton—Lawrence	Michelle Cooper	~~Natasha Doyle-Merrick~~	Vince Gasparro	Leah Tysoe			Robin Martin†
Willowdale	Stan Cho	Boris Ivanov	Paul Saguil	Sharolyn Vettese		Pit Goyal (Prog.)	Stan Cho
Willowdale	Stan Cho	Boris Ivanov	Paul Saguil	Sharolyn Vettese		Lilya Eklishaeva (Ind.)	Stan Cho
York Centre	Michael Kerzner	Natalie Van Halteren	Sam Nestico	Courtney Martin	Johnny Blythe	Jeffrey Anisman (PPO)	Michael Kerzner
York Centre	Michael Kerzner	Natalie Van Halteren	Sam Nestico	Courtney Martin	Johnny Blythe	Parviz Isgandarov (Mod.)	Michael Kerzner
York Centre	Michael Kerzner	Natalie Van Halteren	Sam Nestico	Courtney Martin	Johnny Blythe	**Lionel Poizner** (PSN)	Michael Kerzner

==== Central Toronto and East York ====
Electoral district	Candidates						Incumbent
Electoral district	PC	NDP	Liberal	Green	New Blue	Other	Incumbent
Beaches—East York	Anna Michaelidis	Kate Dupuis	Mary-Margaret McMahon	Jack Pennings	Thomas Gregory	Paul Stark (TOP)	Mary-Margaret McMahon
Beaches—East York	Anna Michaelidis	Kate Dupuis	Mary-Margaret McMahon	Jack Pennings	Thomas Gregory	**Bahman Yazdanfar** (CCP)	Mary-Margaret McMahon
Beaches—East York	Anna Michaelidis	Kate Dupuis	Mary-Margaret McMahon	Jack Pennings	Thomas Gregory	Dragan Cimesa (Ind.)	Mary-Margaret McMahon
Davenport	Nick Pavlov	**Marit Stiles**	Paulo Pereira	Randi Ramdeen		Dave McKee (Comm.)	**Marit Stiles**
Parkdale—High Park	Justine Teplycky	Alexa Gilmour	Nadia Guerrera	Anna Gorka	Geoffrey Corfield	Rimmy Riarh (Comm.)	Bhutila Karpoche†
Spadina—Fort York	Omar Farhat	Chris Glover	April Engelberg	Patrick Macklem		Ron Shaw (NOTA)	Chris Glover
Toronto Centre	Ruth Farkas	Kristyn Wong-Tam	Holly Rasky	Andrew Massey	Steve Hoehlmann	**Sana Ahmad** (Prog.)	Kristyn Wong-Tam
Toronto Centre	Ruth Farkas	Kristyn Wong-Tam	Holly Rasky	Andrew Massey	Steve Hoehlmann	Cory Deville (Ind.)	Kristyn Wong-Tam
Toronto—Danforth	Adam Ratkowski	Peter Tabuns	Connor Taras	Orlando Wright	Stephen Graham		Peter Tabuns
Toronto—St. Paul's	Riley Braunstein	Jill Andrew	Stephanie Smyth	Chloe Tangpongprush			Jill Andrew
University—Rosedale	Sydney Pothakos	Jessica Bell	Pamela Jeffery	Ignacio Mongrell	Dylan Harris		Jessica Bell

==== Etobicoke and York ====
Electoral district	Candidates						Incumbent
Electoral district	PC	NDP	Liberal	Green	New Blue	Other	Incumbent
Etobicoke Centre	Kinga Surma	Giulia Volpe	John Campbell	Brian Morris	Mario Bilusic	Richard Kiernicki (NOTA)	Kinga Surma
Etobicoke Centre	Kinga Surma	Giulia Volpe	John Campbell	Brian Morris	Mario Bilusic	Paul Fromm (CCP)	Kinga Surma
Etobicoke Centre	Kinga Surma	Giulia Volpe	John Campbell	Brian Morris	Mario Bilusic	Signe Miranda (PSN)	Kinga Surma
Etobicoke—Lakeshore	Christine Hogarth	Rozhen Asrani	Lee Fairclough	Sean McClocklin	Tony Siskos	Vitas Naudziunas (NOTA)	Christine Hogarth
Etobicoke—Lakeshore	Christine Hogarth	Rozhen Asrani	Lee Fairclough	Sean McClocklin	Tony Siskos	Larisa Berson (Mod.)	Christine Hogarth
Etobicoke North	**Doug Ford**	Bryan Blair	Julie Lutete	Chelsey Edwards	John Gardner	Andy D'Andrea (TOP)	**Doug Ford**
Humber River—Black Creek	Paul Nguyen	Tom Rakocevic	Liban Hassan	Alexander Qanbery		Jeanne McGuire (Comm.)	Tom Rakocevic
York South—Weston	Mohamed Firin	Faisal Hassan	Daniel Di Giorgio	Lilian Barrera	Victor Ehikwe	K. Ann Thomas (Ind.)	Michael Ford†

=== Hamilton, Halton and Niagara ===
==== Halton ====
Electoral district	Candidates						Incumbent
Electoral district	PC	NDP	Liberal	Green	New Blue	Other	Incumbent
Burlington	Natalie Pierre	Megan Beauchemin	Andrea Grebenc	Kyle Hutton	James Chilli Chillingworth	David Crombie (NOTA)	Natalie Pierre
Milton	Zee Hamid	Katherine Cirlincione	Kristina Tesser Derksen	Susan Doyle	John Spina	Mohsin Rizvi (CPO)	Zee Hamid
Oakville	Stephen Crawford	Diane Downey	Alison Gohel	Bruno Sousa	Shereen Di Vittorio	Sandor Kornay (Mod.)	Stephen Crawford
Oakville North—Burlington	Effie Triantafilopoulos	Caleb Smolenaars	Kaniz Mouli	Ali Hosny	Charles Wroblewski		Effie Triantafilopoulos

==== Hamilton ====
Electoral district	Candidates						Incumbent
Electoral district	PC	NDP	Liberal	Green	New Blue	Other	Incumbent
Flamborough—Glanbrook	Donna Skelly	Lilly Noble	Joshua Bell	Janet Errygers	Kristen Halfpenny		Donna Skelly
Hamilton Centre	Sarah Bokhari	Robin Lennox	Eileen Walker	Lucia Iannantuono	Mitch Novosad	Sarah Jama (Ind.)	Sarah Jama
Hamilton Centre	Sarah Bokhari	Robin Lennox	Eileen Walker	Lucia Iannantuono	Mitch Novosad	Nathalie Xian Yi Yan (Ind.)	Sarah Jama
Hamilton East—Stoney Creek	Neil Lumsden	Zaigham Butt	Heino Doessing	Pascale Marchand	Wieslawa Derlatka	Heather Curnew (TOP)	Neil Lumsden
Hamilton East—Stoney Creek	Neil Lumsden	Zaigham Butt	Heino Doessing	Pascale Marchand	Wieslawa Derlatka	**Drew Garvie** (Comm.)	Neil Lumsden
Hamilton Mountain	Monica Ciriello	Kojo Damptey	Dawn Danko	Joshua Czerniga	Layla Marie-Angela Protopapa	Bing Wong (TOP)	Monique Taylor†
Hamilton Mountain	Monica Ciriello	Kojo Damptey	Dawn Danko	Joshua Czerniga	Layla Marie-Angela Protopapa	Dan Preston (NOTA)	Monique Taylor†
Hamilton Mountain	Monica Ciriello	Kojo Damptey	Dawn Danko	Joshua Czerniga	Layla Marie-Angela Protopapa	Ejaz Butt (Ind.)	Monique Taylor†
Hamilton West—Ancaster—Dundas	John Demik	Sandy Shaw	Julia Brown	Guy Bisson	Lee Weiss Vassor	Spencer Rocchi (NOTA)	Sandy Shaw
Hamilton West—Ancaster—Dundas	John Demik	Sandy Shaw	Julia Brown	Guy Bisson	Lee Weiss Vassor	Nori Smith (ERP)	Sandy Shaw

==== Niagara ====
Electoral district	Candidates								Incumbent
Electoral district	PC	NDP	Liberal	Green	New Blue	Ontario Party	Ontario Alliance	Other	Incumbent
Niagara Centre	Bill Steele	Jeff Burch	Damien O'Brien	Natashia Bergen	Jimmy Jackson	Darryl Weinberg	Angela Browne		Jeff Burch
Niagara Falls	Ruth-ann Nieuwesteeg	Wayne Gates	Shafoli Kapur	Celia Taylor	Gary Dumelie	Andrew Soifert		Joedy Burdett (Ind.)	Wayne Gates
Niagara West	Sam Oosterhoff	Dave Augustyn	Shauna Boyle	Mark Harrison	Aaron Albano	Aaron Allison		Stefanos Karatopis (Libert.)	Sam Oosterhoff
Niagara West	Sam Oosterhoff	Dave Augustyn	Shauna Boyle	Mark Harrison	Aaron Albano	Aaron Allison		**Jim Torma** (PPO)	Sam Oosterhoff
St. Catharines	Sal Sorrento	Jennie Stevens	Robin McPherson	Stephen Vincelette-Smith	Rob Atalick	Liz Leeuwenburg	J. Justin O'Donnell	Natalia Benoit (SNSA)	Jennie Stevens

=== Midwestern Ontario ===
Electoral district	Candidates							Incumbent
Electoral district	PC	NDP	Liberal	Green	New Blue	Ontario Party	Other	Incumbent
Brantford—Brant	Will Bouma	Harvey Bischof	Ron Fox	Karleigh Csordas	Joshua Carron		Rob Ferguson (Libert.)	Will Bouma
Brantford—Brant	Will Bouma	Harvey Bischof	Ron Fox	Karleigh Csordas	Joshua Carron		Mike Clancy (NOTA)	Will Bouma
Brantford—Brant	Will Bouma	Harvey Bischof	Ron Fox	Karleigh Csordas	Joshua Carron		James Carruthers (All)	Will Bouma
Cambridge	Brian Riddell	Marjorie Knight	Rob Deutschmann	Carla Johnson	Belinda Karahalios			Brian Riddell
Guelph	Bob Coole	Cameron Spence	Mustafa Zuberi	Mike Schreiner	Carina Fraser			**Mike Schreiner**
Haldimand—Norfolk	Amy Martin	Erica Englert	Vandan Patel	Anna Massinen	Garry Tanchak		Bobbi Ann Brady (Ind.)	Bobbi Ann Brady
Huron—Bruce	Lisa Thompson	Nick McGregor	Ian Burbidge	Matthew Van Ankum	Zack Weiler		Bruce Eisen (All)	Lisa Thompson
Kitchener Centre	Rob Elliott	Brooklin Wallis	Colleen James	Aislinn Clancy	Paul Simoes	Sebastian Butnar-Stoica	Christopher Nuhn (Ind.)	Aislinn Clancy
Kitchener—Conestoga	Mike Harris Jr.	Jodi Szimanski	Joe Gowing	Brayden Wagenaar	**Jim Karahalios**	Patrick Doucette		Mike Harris Jr.
Kitchener South—Hespeler	Jess Dixon	Jeff Donkersgoed	Ismail Mohamed	Jessica Riley	John Soule			Jess Dixon
Oxford	Ernie Hardeman	Khadijah Haliru	Bernia Martin	Colton Kaufman	Peter Beimers	Grace Harper	Henryk Szymczyszyn (Libert.)	Ernie Hardeman
Perth—Wellington	Matthew Rae	Jason Davis	Ashley Fox	Ian Morton	James Montgomery	Sarah Zenuh	Rob Smink (FPO)	Matthew Rae
Waterloo	Peter Turkington	Catherine Fife	Clayton Moore	Shefaza Esmail	Suja Biber	Chris Martin	James Schulz (Libert.)	Catherine Fife
Waterloo	Peter Turkington	Catherine Fife	Clayton Moore	Shefaza Esmail	Suja Biber	Chris Martin	**Peter House** (ERP)	Catherine Fife
Wellington—Halton Hills	Joseph Racinsky	Simone Kent	Alex Hilson	Bronwynne Wilton	Stephen Kitras	Jason Medland	Ron Patava (Ind.)	Ted Arnott†

=== Southwestern Ontario ===
Electoral district	Candidates							Incumbent
Electoral district	PC	NDP	Liberal	Green	New Blue	Ontario Party	Other	Incumbent
Chatham-Kent—Leamington	Trevor Jones	Christian Sachs	Bill Kirby	Matthew Davey	Rhonda Jubenville	Phillip St-Laurent		Trevor Jones
Elgin—Middlesex—London	Rob Flack	Amanda Zavitz	Douglas MacTavish	Amanda Stark	Brian Figueiredo	Cooper Labrie	Stephen R. Campbell (NOTA)	Rob Flack
Essex	Anthony Leardi	Rachael Mills	Tamara Stomp	Steve Higgins	Brigitte Belton	Travis Jacques	Kevin Linfield (NOTA)	Anthony Leardi
Essex	Anthony Leardi	Rachael Mills	Tamara Stomp	Steve Higgins	Brigitte Belton	Travis Jacques	William Szabo Verzoc (Ind.)	Anthony Leardi
Lambton—Kent—Middlesex	Steve Pinsonneault	Kathryn Shailer	Cathy Burghardt-Jesson	Andraena Tilgner	Andy Fisher			Steve Pinsonneault
London—Fanshawe	Peter Vanderley	Teresa Armstrong	Kevin May	Wil Osbourne-Sorrell	Christopher West		Dave Durnin (FPO)	Teresa Armstrong
London—Fanshawe	Peter Vanderley	Teresa Armstrong	Kevin May	Wil Osbourne-Sorrell	Christopher West		Alan John McDonald (Ind.)	Teresa Armstrong
London North Centre	Jerry Pribil	Terence Kernaghan	Tariq Khan	Carol Dyck	Chris Wile		**Paul McKeever** (FPO)	Terence Kernaghan
London West	Beth Allison	Peggy Sattler	Bakar Khan	Jim Johnston	Shane Dale		Ken Byma (Libert.)	Peggy Sattler
London West	Beth Allison	Peggy Sattler	Bakar Khan	Jim Johnston	Shane Dale		Tim Hodges (FPO)	Peggy Sattler
London West	Beth Allison	Peggy Sattler	Bakar Khan	Jim Johnston	Shane Dale		Timothy Hammer (Ind.)	Peggy Sattler
Sarnia—Lambton	Bob Bailey	Candace Young	Rachel Willsie	Pamela Reid	Keith Benn	Mark Lamore	Jacques Boudreau (Libert.)	Bob Bailey
Sarnia—Lambton	Bob Bailey	Candace Young	Rachel Willsie	Pamela Reid	Keith Benn	Mark Lamore	Tom Stoukas (PPO)	Bob Bailey
Sarnia—Lambton	Bob Bailey	Candace Young	Rachel Willsie	Pamela Reid	Keith Benn	Mark Lamore	Nathan Colquhoun (Ind.)	Bob Bailey
Windsor—Tecumseh	Andrew Dowie	Gemma Grey-Hall	Connor Logan	Roxanne Tellier	Sophia Sevo	Steven Gifford	Kyle Ford (Comm.)	Andrew Dowie
Windsor West	Tony Francis	Lisa Gretzky	~~Moe Chehab~~	Nick Kolasky	Joshua Griffin	Matthew Giancola	Mark Dewdney (NOTA)	Lisa Gretzky

=== Northern Ontario ===
==== Northeastern Ontario ====
Electoral district	Candidates						Incumbent
Electoral district	PC	NDP	Liberal	Green	New Blue	Other	Incumbent
Algoma—Manitoulin	Bill Rosenberg	David Timeriski	Reg Niganobe	Maria Legault	Sheldon Pressey	Michael Mantha (Ind.)	Michael Mantha
Mushkegowuk—James Bay	David Plourde	Guy Bourgouin	Kyle Allen	Catherine Jones			Guy Bourgouin
Nickel Belt	Randy Hazlett	France Gélinas	Natalie Labbée	Connie Hill	Paul Divincenzo	James Chretien (Libert.)	France Gélinas
Nipissing	Vic Fedeli	Loren Mick	Liam McGarry	Colton Chaput		Scott Mooney (TOP)	Vic Fedeli
Nipissing	Vic Fedeli	Loren Mick	Liam McGarry	Colton Chaput		Michelle Lashbrook (Libert.)	Vic Fedeli
Parry Sound—Muskoka	Graydon Smith	Jim Ronholm	David Innes	Matt Richter	Brandon Nicksy	Helen Kroeker (TOP)	Graydon Smith
Sault Ste. Marie	Chris Scott	Lisa Vezeau-Allen	Gurwinder Dusanjh	Jaycob Jacques	Arnold Heino	Paul Frolich (TOP)	Ross Romano†
Sudbury	Max Massimiliano	Jamie West	Rashid Mukhtar Chaudhry	David Robinson	Brady Legault	J. David Popescu (Ind.)	Jamie West
Timiskaming—Cochrane	Tory Delaurier	John Vanthof	Rick Ellsmere	Kris Rivard	Stephen MacLeod		John Vanthof
Timmins	George Pirie	Corey Lepage	Dominic Casto	Marie-Josée Yelle	David Farrell		George Pirie

==== Northwestern Ontario ====
Electoral district	Candidates							Incumbent
Electoral district	PC	NDP	Liberal	Green	New Blue	Northern Ontario	Other	Incumbent
Kenora—Rainy River	Greg Rickford	Rudy Turtle	Anthony Leek	John Redins	Randy Ricci			Greg Rickford
Kiiwetinoong	Waylon Scott	Sol Mamakwa	Manuela Michelizzi	Carolyn Spicer		Theresa Leppich		Sol Mamakwa
Thunder Bay—Atikokan	Kevin Holland	Judith Monteith-Farrell	Stephen Margarit	Eric Arner	Martin Tempelman	K.C. Jones		Kevin Holland
Thunder Bay—Superior North	Rick Dumas	Lise Vaugeois	Brian Hamilton	John Northey	Katherine Suutari	Daniel K. Campbell	Steve Hanssen (Ind.)	Lise Vaugeois
