= Candidates of the 2022 Ontario general election =

- June 2, 2022

The following tables list by region the nominated candidates for the 2022 Ontario general election.

For results see 2022 Ontario general election#Results

== Abbreviations guide ==
Abbreviations of political parties used in these tables:

- All – Ontario Alliance
- CCP – Canadians' Choice Party
- Consen. – Consensus Ontario
- CPO – Ontario Centrist Party
- Comm. – Communist Party of Canada (Ontario)
- ERP – Electoral Reform Party
- FPJ – Freedom of Choice, Peace & Justice Party
- FPO – Freedom Party of Ontario
- Green – Green Party of Ontario
- Ind. – Independent
- Liberal – Ontario Liberal Party
- Libert. – Ontario Libertarian Party
- Mod. – Ontario Moderate Party
- N. Ont – Northern Ontario Party
- NB – New Blue Party of Ontario
- NDP – Ontario New Democratic Party
- NOTA – None of the Above Party
- PPCFO – People's Progressive Common Front of Ontario
- PC – Progressive Conservative Party of Ontario
- PBP – Public Benefit Party of Ontario
- PCRP – Ontario Provincial Confederation of Regions Party
- People – The Peoples Political Party
- PSN – Party for People with Special Needs
- PPO – Populist Party Ontario
- SNSA – Stop the New Sex-Ed Agenda
- TOP – Ontario Party

== Number of candidates by party ==
Nominated candidates for the 2022 Ontario general election
Party	Leader	Candidates
Ontario Alliance	Joshua Eriksen	2
Canadians' Choice Party	Bahman Yazdanfar	2
Consensus Ontario	Brad Harness	11
Ontario Centrist Party	Mansoor Qureshi	2
Communist Party of Canada (Ontario)	Drew Garvie	13
Electoral Reform Party	Peter House	2
Freedom of Choice, Peace & Justice Party	Lilya Eklishaeva	2
Freedom Party of Ontario	Paul McKeever	11
Green Party of Ontario	Mike Schreiner	124
Ontario Liberal Party	Steven Del Duca	121 †
Ontario Libertarian Party	Mark Snow	16
Ontario Moderate Party	Yuri Duboisky	17
Northern Ontario Party	Trevor Holliday	2
New Blue Party of Ontario	Jim Karahalios	123 ‡
Ontario New Democratic Party	Andrea Horwath	124
None of the Above Party	Greg Vezina	28
Ontario Party	Derek Sloan	105
Progressive Conservative Party of Ontario	Doug Ford	124
Public Benefit Party of Ontario	Kathleen Ann Sayer	2
Ontario Provincial Confederation of Regions Party	Murray Reid	3
The Peoples Political Party	Troy Young	3
People's Progressive Common Front of Ontario	Raymond Samuels	3
Party for People with Special Needs	Lionel Poizner	2
Populist Party Ontario	Jim Torma	13
Stop the New Sex-Ed Agenda	Queenie Yu	3
Independent		41
Total		901

† A Liberal candidate in Parry Sound—Muskoka was deregistered from the party before May 12, 2022, due to allegations of homophobic comments. A Liberal candidate in Chatham-Kent—Leamington was deregistered from the party for past homophobic comments on social media. A replacement candidate for the Liberals in Chatham-Kent—Leamington later withdrew from the race, citing personal attacks after the NDP alleged that the candidate had been registered using the previous candidate's signatures. Additionally, the Liberals did not field a candidate in Timmins due to "a technical issue".

‡ One New Blue candidate in Ottawa West—Nepean was deregistered on May 17, 2022, due to Canadian military rules.

== Candidates and results ==
† = indicates that the incumbent is not seeking re-election
‡ = indicates that the incumbent is running for re-election in a different riding
§ = represents that the incumbent was refused nomination by their party
$ = represents that the incumbent was announced as nominated by their party but later chose to retire
# = represents that the incumbent was announced as nominated by their party but later lost that party's nomination through departure or expulsion from caucus
bold indicates party leader
italics = indicates a contestant for nomination or declared interest
~~strikethrough~~ indicates a candidate that has been disqualified or withdrew

=== Eastern Ontario ===
Electoral district	Candidates							Incumbent
Electoral district	PC	NDP	Liberal	Green	New Blue	Ontario Party	Other	Incumbent
Bay of Quinte	Todd Smith	Alison Kelly	Emilie Leneveu	Erica Charlton	Rob Collins	Noah Wales		Todd Smith
Glengarry—Prescott—Russell	Stéphane Sarrazin	Alicia Eglin	Amanda Simard	Thaila Riden	Victor Brassard	Stéphane Aubry		Amanda Simard
Hastings—Lennox and Addington	Ric Bresee	Eric DePoe	Ted Darby	Christina Wilson	Joyce Reid	**Derek Sloan**		Daryl Kramp $
Kingston and the Islands	Gary Bennett	Mary Rita Holland	Ted Hsu	Zachary Typhair	Stephen Skyvington	Shalea Beckwith	Laurel Claus Johnson (Consen.)	Ian Arthur †
Kingston and the Islands	Gary Bennett	Mary Rita Holland	Ted Hsu	Zachary Typhair	Stephen Skyvington	Shalea Beckwith	Shelley Joanne Galloway (Ind.)	Ian Arthur †
Kingston and the Islands	Gary Bennett	Mary Rita Holland	Ted Hsu	Zachary Typhair	Stephen Skyvington	Shalea Beckwith	Sebastian Vaillancourt (Comm.)	Ian Arthur †
Lanark—Frontenac—Kingston	John Jordan	Drew Cumpson	Amanda Pulker-Mok	Marlene Spruyt	Marcin Lewandowski	Thomas Mulder	Chelsea Hillier (PPO)	Randy Hillier †
Lanark—Frontenac—Kingston	John Jordan	Drew Cumpson	Amanda Pulker-Mok	Marlene Spruyt	Marcin Lewandowski	Thomas Mulder	Craig Timothy Massey Rogers (Ind.)	Randy Hillier †
Leeds—Grenville—Thousand Islands and Rideau Lakes	Steve Clark	Chris Wilson	Josh Bennett	Fiona Jager	Dan Kitsch	Glenn L. Malcolm	Stephen Ireland (PPCFO)	Steve Clark
Leeds—Grenville—Thousand Islands and Rideau Lakes	Steve Clark	Chris Wilson	Josh Bennett	Fiona Jager	Dan Kitsch	Glenn L. Malcolm	Dave Senger (PPO)	Steve Clark
Leeds—Grenville—Thousand Islands and Rideau Lakes	Steve Clark	Chris Wilson	Josh Bennett	Fiona Jager	Dan Kitsch	Glenn L. Malcolm	**Mark Snow** (Libert.)	Steve Clark
Renfrew—Nipissing—Pembroke	John Yakabuski	Kurt Stoll	Oliver A. Jacob	Anna Dolan	Thomas O'Connor	Kade MacWilliams	Murray Reid (PCRP)	John Yakabuski
Stormont—Dundas—South Glengarry	Nolan Quinn	Wendy Stephen	Kirsten J. Gardner	Jacqueline Milner	Claude Tardif	Remi Tremblay		Jim McDonell $

==== Ottawa ====
Electoral district	Candidates							Incumbent
Electoral district	PC	NDP	Liberal	Green	New Blue	Ontario Party	Others	Incumbent
Carleton	Goldie Ghamari	Kevin St. Denis	Tom Dawson	Cody Zulinski	Rob Stocki	Ethan Ferguson	Chris Mark Beauchamp (NOTA)	Goldie Ghamari
Kanata—Carleton	Merrilee Fullerton	Melissa Coenraad	Shahbaz Syed	Pat Freel	Jennifer Boudreau	Brian Chuipka		Merrilee Fullerton
Nepean	Lisa MacLeod	Brian Double	Tyler Watt	Kaitlyn Tremblay	Kathleen Corriveau	Bryan Emmerson		Lisa MacLeod
Orléans	Melissa Felián	Gabe Bourdon	Stephen Blais	Michelle Petersen	Liam Randall	Vince Clements	Ken Lewis (Libert.)	Stephen Blais
Ottawa Centre	Scott Healey	Joel Harden	Katie Gibbs	Shelby Bertrand	Glen Armstrong		Marc Adornato (NOTA)	Joel Harden
Ottawa Centre	Scott Healey	Joel Harden	Katie Gibbs	Shelby Bertrand	Glen Armstrong		Thomas Borcsok (Ind.)	Joel Harden
Ottawa Centre	Scott Healey	Joel Harden	Katie Gibbs	Shelby Bertrand	Glen Armstrong		Josh Rachlis (Ind.)	Joel Harden
Ottawa Centre	Scott Healey	Joel Harden	Katie Gibbs	Shelby Bertrand	Glen Armstrong		Stuart Ryan (Comm.)	Joel Harden
Ottawa Centre	Scott Healey	Joel Harden	Katie Gibbs	Shelby Bertrand	Glen Armstrong		**Raymond Samuels** (PPCFO)	Joel Harden
Ottawa South	Edward Dinca	Morgan Gay	John Fraser	Nira Dookeran	Martin Ince	Myles Dear	Daniel Thomas (Ind.)	John Fraser
Ottawa South	Edward Dinca	Morgan Gay	John Fraser	Nira Dookeran	Martin Ince	Myles Dear	Larry Wasslen (Comm.)	John Fraser
Ottawa—Vanier	Patrick Mayangi	Lyra Evans	Lucille Collard	Christian Proulx	Michael Pastien	Eric Armstrong-Giroux	Coreen Corcoran (Libert.)	Lucille Collard
Ottawa—Vanier	Patrick Mayangi	Lyra Evans	Lucille Collard	Christian Proulx	Michael Pastien	Eric Armstrong-Giroux	Blake Hamilton (NOTA)	Lucille Collard
Ottawa—Vanier	Patrick Mayangi	Lyra Evans	Lucille Collard	Christian Proulx	Michael Pastien	Eric Armstrong-Giroux	David McGruer (FPO)	Lucille Collard
Ottawa West—Nepean	Jeremy Roberts	Chandra Pasma	Sam Bhalesar	Steven Warren	~~Scott Blandford~~	Vilteau Delvas		Jeremy Roberts

=== Central Ontario ===
Electoral district	Candidates							Incumbent
Electoral district	PC	NDP	Liberal	Green	New Blue	Ontario Party	Other	Incumbent
Barrie—Innisfil	Andrea Khanjin	Pekka Reinio	John Olthuis	Bonnie North	Ashlyn Steele	Grace Dean	Benjamin Hughes (Ind.)	Andrea Khanjin
Barrie—Innisfil	Andrea Khanjin	Pekka Reinio	John Olthuis	Bonnie North	Ashlyn Steele	Grace Dean	Jake Tucker (PPCFO)	Andrea Khanjin
Barrie—Springwater—Oro-Medonte	Doug Downey	Beverley Patchell	Jeff Lehman	Elyse Robinson	Hayden Hughes	Gerry Auger		Doug Downey
Bruce—Grey—Owen Sound	Rick Byers	Karen Gventer	Selwyn J. Hicks	Danielle Valiquette	Vince Grimaldi	Suzanne Coles	Reima Kaikkonen (Ind.)	Bill Walker $
Bruce—Grey—Owen Sound	Rick Byers	Karen Gventer	Selwyn J. Hicks	Danielle Valiquette	Vince Grimaldi	Suzanne Coles	Joel Loughead (NOTA)	Bill Walker $
Bruce—Grey—Owen Sound	Rick Byers	Karen Gventer	Selwyn J. Hicks	Danielle Valiquette	Vince Grimaldi	Suzanne Coles	Joseph Westover (PPO)	Bill Walker $
Dufferin—Caledon	Sylvia Jones	Tess Prendergast	Bob Gordanier	Laura Campbell	Andrea Banyai	Lily Nguyen	Erickumar Emmanuel (Mod.)	Sylvia Jones
Dufferin—Caledon	Sylvia Jones	Tess Prendergast	Bob Gordanier	Laura Campbell	Andrea Banyai	Lily Nguyen	Kay Sayer (PBP)	Sylvia Jones
Haliburton—Kawartha Lakes—Brock	Laurie Scott	Barbara Doyle	Don McBey	Tom Regina	Ben Prentice	Kerstin Kelly=	Gene Balfour (Libert.)	Laurie Scott
Northumberland—Peterborough South	David Piccini	Kim McArthur-Jackson	Jeff Kawzenuk	Lisa Francis	Joshua Chalhoub	Vanessa Head		David Piccini
Peterborough—Kawartha	Dave Smith	Jen Deck	Greg Dempsey	Robert Gibson	Rebecca Quinnell	Tom Marazzo		Dave Smith
Simcoe—Grey	Brian Saunderson	Keith Nunn	Ted Crysler	Allan Kuhn	David Ghobrial	Rodney Sacrey	Billy G. Gordon (NOTA)	Jim Wilson †
Simcoe North	Jill Dunlop	Elizabeth Van Houtte	Aaron Cayden Hiltz	Krystal Brooks	Mark Douris	Aaron Macdonald	William Joslin (Libert.)	Jill Dunlop
York—Simcoe	Caroline Mulroney	Spencer Yang Ki	Walter Alvarez-Bardales	Julie Stewart	Brent Fellman	Alana Hollander	Franco Colavecchia (Mod.)	Caroline Mulroney
York—Simcoe	Caroline Mulroney	Spencer Yang Ki	Walter Alvarez-Bardales	Julie Stewart	Brent Fellman	Alana Hollander	Zachary Tisdale (Libert.)	Caroline Mulroney

=== 905 Belt ===
==== Durham ====
Electoral district	Candidates							Incumbent	
Electoral district	PC	NDP	Liberal	Green	New Blue	Ontario Party	Other	Incumbent	
Ajax	Patrice Barnes	Christine Santos	Amber Bowen	Neil Runnalls	Garry Reader	Aaron Hopkins	Intab Ali (Ind.)		Vacant
Ajax	Patrice Barnes	Christine Santos	Amber Bowen	Neil Runnalls	Garry Reader	Aaron Hopkins	Allen Hadley (Ind.)		Vacant
Durham	Todd McCarthy	Chris Borgia	Granville Anderson	Mini Batra	Spencer Ford	Lou De Vuono	Tony Stravato (Ind.)		Lindsey Park #
Oshawa	Alex Down	Jennifer French	Catherine Mosca	Katarina Dunham	Daryl Janssen	Dave Forsythe		Jennifer French	
Pickering—Uxbridge	Peter Bethlenfalvy	Khalid Ahmed	Ibrahim Daniyal	Julia Rondinone	Elizabeth Tallis	Lisa Robinson	Abir Dabbour (Ind.)		Peter Bethlenfalvy
Pickering—Uxbridge	Peter Bethlenfalvy	Khalid Ahmed	Ibrahim Daniyal	Julia Rondinone	Elizabeth Tallis	Lisa Robinson	Netalia Duboisky (Mod.)		Peter Bethlenfalvy
Pickering—Uxbridge	Peter Bethlenfalvy	Khalid Ahmed	Ibrahim Daniyal	Julia Rondinone	Elizabeth Tallis	Lisa Robinson	Hasan Syed (CPO)		Peter Bethlenfalvy
Whitby	Lorne Coe	Sara Labelle	Aadil Mohammed	Stephanie Leblanc	Trystan Lackner	Emil Labaj	Christopher Rinella (Ind.)		Lorne Coe
Whitby	Lorne Coe	Sara Labelle	Aadil Mohammed	Stephanie Leblanc	Trystan Lackner	Emil Labaj	Douglas Thom (FPO)		Lorne Coe

==== Peel ====
Electoral district	Candidates							Incumbent
Electoral district	PC	NDP	Liberal	Green	New Blue	Ontario Party	Other	Incumbent
Brampton Centre	Charmaine Williams	Sara Singh	Safdar Hussain	Karitsa Tye	Kathy Matusiak Costa			Sara Singh
Brampton East	Hardeep Grewal	Gurratan Singh	Jannat Garewal	Jamaal Blackwood	Mike Bayer	Paul Stark		Gurratan Singh
Brampton North	Graham McGregor	Sandeep Singh	Harinder K Malhi	Aneep Dhade	Jerry Fussek	Julia Bauman		Kevin Yarde §
Brampton South	Prabmeet Singh Sarkaria	Andria Barrett	Marilyn Raphael	Ines Espinoza	Mike Mol		Mehdi Pakzad (NOTA)	Prabmeet Sarkaria
Brampton West	Amarjot Sandhu	Navjit Kaur	Rimmy Jhajj	Pauline Thornham	David Pardy	Manjot Sekhon		Amarjot Sandhu
Mississauga Centre	Natalia Kusendova	Sarah Walji	Sumira Malik	Adriane Franklin	Audrey Simpson	Stephanie Wright	Viktor Chornopyskyy (Mod.)	Natalia Kusendova
Mississauga Centre	Natalia Kusendova	Sarah Walji	Sumira Malik	Adriane Franklin	Audrey Simpson	Stephanie Wright	Elie Diab (PPO)	Natalia Kusendova
Mississauga Centre	Natalia Kusendova	Sarah Walji	Sumira Malik	Adriane Franklin	Audrey Simpson	Stephanie Wright	**Greg Vezina** (NOTA)	Natalia Kusendova
Mississauga East—Cooksville	Kaleed Rasheed	Khawar Hussain	Dipika Damerla	James Hea	Mark Morrissey	Gregory Tomchyshyn	Wiktor Jachtholtz (Mod.)	Kaleed Rasheed
Mississauga—Erin Mills	Sheref Sabawy	Farina Hassan	Imran Mian	Michelle Angkasa	Charles Wroblewski	Laura E. Scarangella		Sheref Sabawy
Mississauga—Lakeshore	Rudy Cuzzetto	Julia Kole	Elizabeth Mendes	David Zeni	Renata Cynarska	George Cescon	Brian Crombie (NOTA)	Rudy Cuzzetto
Mississauga—Malton	Deepak Anand	Waseem Ahmed	Aman Gill	Robert Chan	Van Nguyen			Deepak Anand
Mississauga—Streetsville	Nina Tangri	Nicholas Rabba	Jill Promoli	Reead Rahamut	Amir Kendic	Christine Oliver	Fourat Jajou (PPO)	Nina Tangri
Mississauga—Streetsville	Nina Tangri	Nicholas Rabba	Jill Promoli	Reead Rahamut	Amir Kendic	Christine Oliver	Len Little (NOTA)	Nina Tangri

==== York ====
Electoral district	Candidates							Incumbent
Electoral district	PC	NDP	Liberal	Green	New Blue	Ontario Party	Other	Incumbent
Aurora—Oak Ridges—Richmond Hill	Michael Parsa	Reza Pourzad	Marjan Kasirlou	Kevin Zheng	Rosaria Wiseman	Catherine Dellerba	Igor Strelkov (Mod.)	Michael Parsa
King—Vaughan	Stephen Lecce	Samantha Sanchez	Gillian Vivona	Ren Guidolin	Michael Di Mascolo	Neil Killips	Tatiana Babitch (Mod.)	Stephen Lecce
Markham—Stouffville	Paul Calandra	Kingsley Kwok	Kelly Dunn	Myles O’Brien	Jennifer Gowland	Michele Petit		Paul Calandra
Markham—Thornhill	Logan Kanapathi	Matthew Henriques	Sandra Tam	Zane Abulail	Jennifer Gleason		**Mansoor Qureshi** (CPO)	Logan Kanapathi
Markham—Unionville	Billy Pang	Senthil Mahalingam	Emily Li	Shanta Sundarason	Trina Kollis	Naz Obredor		Billy Pang
Newmarket—Aurora	Dawn Gallagher Murphy	Denis Heng	Sylvain Roy	Carolina Rodriguez	Iwona Czarnecka	Krista Mckenzie	**Yuri Duboisky** (Mod.)	Christine Elliott $
Richmond Hill	Daisy Wai	Raymond Bhushan	Roozbeh Farhadi	Hasen Nicanfar	Les Hoffman	Ramtin Biouckzadeh	Olga Rykova (Mod.)	Daisy Wai
Thornhill	Laura Smith	Jasleen Kambo	Laura Mirabella	Daniella Mikanovsky	Yakov Zarkhine	Igor Tvorogov	Jacob Joel Ginsberg (Ind.)	Gila Martow †
Thornhill	Laura Smith	Jasleen Kambo	Laura Mirabella	Daniella Mikanovsky	Yakov Zarkhine	Igor Tvorogov	Hiten Patel	Gila Martow †
Thornhill	Laura Smith	Jasleen Kambo	Laura Mirabella	Daniella Mikanovsky	Yakov Zarkhine	Igor Tvorogov	Roman Pesis (FPJ)	Gila Martow †
Thornhill	Laura Smith	Jasleen Kambo	Laura Mirabella	Daniella Mikanovsky	Yakov Zarkhine	Igor Tvorogov	Aleksei Polyakov (Mod.)	Gila Martow †
Thornhill	Laura Smith	Jasleen Kambo	Laura Mirabella	Daniella Mikanovsky	Yakov Zarkhine	Igor Tvorogov	Brandon Ying (Ind.)	Gila Martow †
Vaughan—Woodbridge	Michael Tibollo	Will McCarty	**Steven Del Duca**	Philip James Piluris	Luca Mele	Gerrard Fortin	Mario Greco (PPO)	Michael Tibollo
Vaughan—Woodbridge	Michael Tibollo	Will McCarty	**Steven Del Duca**	Philip James Piluris	Luca Mele	Gerrard Fortin	Walid Omrani (Mod.)	Michael Tibollo

=== Toronto ===
==== Scarborough ====
Electoral district	Candidates							Incumbent
Electoral district	PC	NDP	Liberal	Green	New Blue	Ontario Party	Other	Incumbent
Scarborough—Agincourt	Aris Babikian	Benjamin Lee Truong	Soo Wong	Jacqueline Scott	Rane Vega	Donny Morgan		Aris Babikian
Scarborough Centre	David Smith	Neethan Shan	Mazhar Shafiq	Fatima Faruq	Hidie Jaber	Raphael Rosch	Paul Beatty (Ind.)	Christina Mitas $
Scarborough Centre	David Smith	Neethan Shan	Mazhar Shafiq	Fatima Faruq	Hidie Jaber	Raphael Rosch	Serge Korovitsyn (Libert.)	Christina Mitas $
Scarborough Centre	David Smith	Neethan Shan	Mazhar Shafiq	Fatima Faruq	Hidie Jaber	Raphael Rosch	Kostadinos Stefanis (Ind.)	Christina Mitas $
Scarborough Centre	David Smith	Neethan Shan	Mazhar Shafiq	Fatima Faruq	Hidie Jaber	Raphael Rosch	Maria Tzvetanova (Mod.)	Christina Mitas $
Scarborough—Guildwood	Alicia Vianga	Veronica Javier	Mitzie Hunter	Dean Boulding	Opa Hope Day	William Moore	Kevin Clarke (People)	Mitzie Hunter
Scarborough North	Raymond Cho	Justin Kong	Anita Anandarajan	Tara McMahon	James Bountrogiannis	Pete Grusys	Mark Dickson (NOTA)	Raymond Cho
Scarborough—Rouge Park	Vijay Thanigasalam	Felicia Samuel	Manal Abdullahi	Priyan De Silva	Christopher Bressi	Gordon Kerr	Matthew Oliver (FPO)	Vijay Thanigasalam
Scarborough Southwest	Bret Snider	Doly Begum	Lisa Patel	Cara Brideau	Peter Naus	Barbara Everatt	James McNair (NOTA)	Doly Begum
Scarborough Southwest	Bret Snider	Doly Begum	Lisa Patel	Cara Brideau	Peter Naus	Barbara Everatt	Michelle Parsons (Ind.)	Doly Begum

==== North York ====
Electoral district	Candidates								Incumbent
Electoral district	PC	NDP	Liberal	Green	New Blue	Ontario Party	NOTA	Other	Incumbent
Don Valley East	Sam Moini	Mara-Elena Nagy	Adil Shamji	Rizwan Khan	Denyse Twagiramariya	Donald McMullen		Svetlozar Aleksiev (Mod.)	Vacant
Don Valley East	Sam Moini	Mara-Elena Nagy	Adil Shamji	Rizwan Khan	Denyse Twagiramariya	Donald McMullen		Stella Kargiannakis (Ind.)	Vacant
Don Valley East	Sam Moini	Mara-Elena Nagy	Adil Shamji	Rizwan Khan	Denyse Twagiramariya	Donald McMullen		Dimitre Popov (Consen.)	Vacant
Don Valley East	Sam Moini	Mara-Elena Nagy	Adil Shamji	Rizwan Khan	Denyse Twagiramariya	Donald McMullen		Wayne Simmons (FPO)	Vacant
Don Valley North	Vincent Ke	Ebrahim Astaraki	Jonathan Tsao	Ostap Soroka	Jay Sobel				Vincent Ke
Don Valley West	Mark Saunders	Irwin Elman	Stephanie Bowman	Sheena Sharp	Laurel Hobbs	Kylie Mc Allister		John Kittredge (Libert.)	Kathleen Wynne †
Don Valley West	Mark Saunders	Irwin Elman	Stephanie Bowman	Sheena Sharp	Laurel Hobbs	Kylie Mc Allister		John Kladitis (Ind.)	Kathleen Wynne †
Don Valley West	Mark Saunders	Irwin Elman	Stephanie Bowman	Sheena Sharp	Laurel Hobbs	Kylie Mc Allister		Paul Reddick (Consen.)	Kathleen Wynne †
Eglinton—Lawrence	Robin Martin	Natasha Doyle-Merrick	Arlena Hebert	Leah Tysoe	Erwin Sniedzins	Lauren Dearing	Bryant Thompson	Jonathan Davis (PBP)	Robin Martin
Eglinton—Lawrence	Robin Martin	Natasha Doyle-Merrick	Arlena Hebert	Leah Tysoe	Erwin Sniedzins	Lauren Dearing	Bryant Thompson	Sam Kaplun (Ind.)	Robin Martin
Eglinton—Lawrence	Robin Martin	Natasha Doyle-Merrick	Arlena Hebert	Leah Tysoe	Erwin Sniedzins	Lauren Dearing	Bryant Thompson	Derek Sharp (PSN)	Robin Martin
Willowdale	Stan Cho	Hal David Berman	Paul Saguil	Monica Henriques	Joanne Csillag	Gian Pietro Arella	Ben Barone	Birinder Singh Ahluwalia (Ind.)	Stan Cho
Willowdale	Stan Cho	Hal David Berman	Paul Saguil	Monica Henriques	Joanne Csillag	Gian Pietro Arella	Ben Barone	**Lilya Eklishaeva** (FPJ)	Stan Cho
Willowdale	Stan Cho	Hal David Berman	Paul Saguil	Monica Henriques	Joanne Csillag	Gian Pietro Arella	Ben Barone	Jaime Rodriguez (PPO)	Stan Cho
Willowdale	Stan Cho	Hal David Berman	Paul Saguil	Monica Henriques	Joanne Csillag	Gian Pietro Arella	Ben Barone	Charles Roddy Sutherland (Ind.)	Stan Cho
York Centre	Michael Kerzner	Frank Chu	Shelley Brown	Alison Lowney	Don Pincivero	Nick Balaskas	Mark Dewdney	Parviz Isgandarov (Mod.)	Roman Baber †
York Centre	Michael Kerzner	Frank Chu	Shelley Brown	Alison Lowney	Don Pincivero	Nick Balaskas	Mark Dewdney	Lionel Wayne Poizner (PSN)	Roman Baber †

==== Central Toronto and East York ====
Electoral district	Candidates							Incumbent
Electoral district	PC	NDP	Liberal	Green	New Blue	Ontario Party	Other	Incumbent
Beaches—East York	Angela Kennedy	Kate Dupuis	Mary-Margaret McMahon	Abhijeet Manay	Stephen Roney	John Ferguson	**Drew Garvie** (Comm.)	Rima Berns-McGown $
Beaches—East York	Angela Kennedy	Kate Dupuis	Mary-Margaret McMahon	Abhijeet Manay	Stephen Roney	John Ferguson	Joe Ring (NOTA)	Rima Berns-McGown $
Beaches—East York	Angela Kennedy	Kate Dupuis	Mary-Margaret McMahon	Abhijeet Manay	Stephen Roney	John Ferguson	**Bahman Yazdanfar** (CCP)	Rima Berns-McGown $
Davenport	Paul Spence	Marit Stiles	Jerry Levitan	Karen Stephenson	Mario Bilusic	Diti Coutinho	Nicholas Alexander (Ind.)	Marit Stiles
Davenport	Paul Spence	Marit Stiles	Jerry Levitan	Karen Stephenson	Mario Bilusic	Diti Coutinho	Jack Copple (Comm.)	Marit Stiles
Davenport	Paul Spence	Marit Stiles	Jerry Levitan	Karen Stephenson	Mario Bilusic	Diti Coutinho	Simon Fogel (Ind.)	Marit Stiles
Davenport	Paul Spence	Marit Stiles	Jerry Levitan	Karen Stephenson	Mario Bilusic	Diti Coutinho	Nunzio Venuto (Libert.)	Marit Stiles
Parkdale—High Park	Monika Frejlich	Bhutila Karpoche	Karim Bardeesy	Patrick Macklem	Danielle Height	Craig Peskett	Gunes Agduk (Comm.)	Bhutila Karpoche
Parkdale—High Park	Monika Frejlich	Bhutila Karpoche	Karim Bardeesy	Patrick Macklem	Danielle Height	Craig Peskett	Oliver Roberts (People)	Bhutila Karpoche
Spadina—Fort York	Husain Neemuchwala	Chris Glover	Chi Nguyen	Cara Des Granges	Angela Asher		Jan Osko (SNSA)	Chris Glover
Toronto Centre	Jessica Goddard	Kristyn Wong-Tam	David Morris	Nicki Ward	Steve Hoehlmann		Ivan Byard (Comm.)	Suze Morrison $
Toronto Centre	Jessica Goddard	Kristyn Wong-Tam	David Morris	Nicki Ward	Steve Hoehlmann		Jennifer Snell (SNSA)	Suze Morrison $
Toronto Centre	Jessica Goddard	Kristyn Wong-Tam	David Morris	Nicki Ward	Steve Hoehlmann		Ron Shaw (NOTA)	Suze Morrison $
Toronto—Danforth	Colleen McCleery	Peter Tabuns	Mary Fragedakis	Marcelo Levy	Milton Kandias	George Simopoulos	Christopher Brophy (NOTA)	Peter Tabuns
Toronto—Danforth	Colleen McCleery	Peter Tabuns	Mary Fragedakis	Marcelo Levy	Milton Kandias	George Simopoulos	Jennifer Moxon (Comm.)	Peter Tabuns
Toronto—St. Paul's	Blake Libfeld	Jill Andrew	Nathan Stall	Ian Lipton	Yehuda Goldberg	Christian Ivanov Mihaylov	Zoë Alexandra (PPO)	Jill Andrew
Toronto—St. Paul's	Blake Libfeld	Jill Andrew	Nathan Stall	Ian Lipton	Yehuda Goldberg	Christian Ivanov Mihaylov	Margarita Sharapova (Mod.)	Jill Andrew
University—Rosedale	Carl Qiu	Jessica Bell	Andrea Barrack	Dianne Saxe	James Leventakis		John Kanary (SNSA)	Jessica Bell

==== Etobicoke and York ====
Electoral district	Candidates							Incumbent
Electoral district	PC	NDP	Liberal	Green	New Blue	Ontario Party	Other	Incumbent
Etobicoke Centre	Kinga Surma	Heather Vickers-Wong	Noel Semple	Brian MacLean	Cathy Habus	Mitchell Gilboy	Richard M. Kiernicki (NOTA)	Kinga Surma
Etobicoke Centre	Kinga Surma	Heather Vickers-Wong	Noel Semple	Brian MacLean	Cathy Habus	Mitchell Gilboy	Genadij Zaitsev (Mod.)	Kinga Surma
Etobicoke—Lakeshore	Christine Hogarth	Farheen Alim	Lee Fairclough	Thomas Yanuziello	Mary Markovic		Bill Denning (Ind.)	Christine Hogarth
Etobicoke—Lakeshore	Christine Hogarth	Farheen Alim	Lee Fairclough	Thomas Yanuziello	Mary Markovic		Vitas Naudziunas (NOTA)	Christine Hogarth
Etobicoke North	**Doug Ford**	Aisha Jahangir	Julie Lutete	Gabriel Blanc	Victor Ehikwe	Andy D'Andrea	Carol Royer (People)	**Doug Ford**
Humber River—Black Creek	Paul Nguyen	Tom Rakocevic	Ida Li Preti	Keith Berry	Iulian Caunei	Lee Miguel Gonzalez	Knia Singh (Ind.)	Tom Rakocevic
York South—Weston	Michael Ford	Faisal Hassan	Nadia Guerrera	Ignacio Mongrell Gonzalez	Tom Hipsz	Ana Gabriela Ortiz	James Michael Fields (Ind.)	Faisal Hassan

=== Hamilton, Halton and Niagara ===
==== Halton ====
Electoral district	Candidates							Incumbent
Electoral district	PC	NDP	Liberal	Green	New Blue	Ontario Party	Other	Incumbent
Burlington	Natalie Pierre	Andrew Drummond	Mariam Manaa	Kyle Hutton	Allison McKenzie	Sebastian Aldea		Jane McKenna $
Milton	Parm Gill	Katherine Cirlincione	Sameera Ali	Oriana Knox	John Spina		Masood Khan (Consen.)	Parm Gill
Oakville	Stephen Crawford	Maeve McNaughton	Alison Gohel	Bruno Sousa	Mark Fraser Platt	Alicia Bedford	Stephen Kenneth Crawford (NOTA)	Stephen Crawford
Oakville	Stephen Crawford	Maeve McNaughton	Alison Gohel	Bruno Sousa	Mark Fraser Platt	Alicia Bedford	Andrew Titov (Mod.)	Stephen Crawford
Oakville	Stephen Crawford	Maeve McNaughton	Alison Gohel	Bruno Sousa	Mark Fraser Platt	Alicia Bedford	Silvio Ursomarzo (FPO)	Stephen Crawford
Oakville North—Burlington	Effie Triantafilopoulos	Rhyan Vincent-Smith	Kaniz Mouli	Ali Hosny	Doru Marin Gordan	Jill Service		Effie Triantafilopoulos

==== Hamilton ====
Electoral district	Candidates							Incumbent
Electoral district	PC	NDP	Liberal	Green	New Blue	Ontario Party	Other	Incumbent
Flamborough—Glanbrook	Donna Skelly	Allison Cillis	Melisse Willems	Mario Portak	Paul Simoes	Walt Juchniewicz	Nikita Mahood (PPO)	Donna Skelly
Hamilton Centre	Sarah Bokhari	**Andrea Horwath**	Ekaterini Dimakis	Sandy Crawley	John Chroust	Brad Peace	Nigel Cheriyan (Comm.)	**Andrea Horwath**
Hamilton Centre	Sarah Bokhari	**Andrea Horwath**	Ekaterini Dimakis	Sandy Crawley	John Chroust	Brad Peace	Nathalie Xian Yi Yan (Ind.)	**Andrea Horwath**
Hamilton East—Stoney Creek	Neil Lumsden	Zaigham Butt	Jason Farr	Cassie Wylie	Jeffery Raulino	Domenic DiLuca	Paul Miller (Ind.)	Paul Miller
Hamilton East—Stoney Creek	Neil Lumsden	Zaigham Butt	Jason Farr	Cassie Wylie	Jeffery Raulino	Domenic DiLuca	Cameron Rajewski (ERP)	Paul Miller
Hamilton Mountain	Michael Spadafora	Monique Taylor	Chantale Lachance	Janet Errygers	Baylee Nguyen	Andy Busa		Monique Taylor
Hamilton West—Ancaster—Dundas	Fred Bennink	Sandy Shaw	Shubha Sandill	Syam Chandra	Lee Weiss	Frank Thiessen		Sandy Shaw

==== Niagara ====
Electoral district	Candidates							Incumbent
Electoral district	PC	NDP	Liberal	Green	New Blue	Ontario Party	Other	Incumbent
Niagara Centre	Fred Davies	Jeff Burch	Terry Flynn	Michelle McArthur	Gary Dumelie	Vincent Gircys		Jeff Burch
Niagara Falls	Bob Gale	Wayne Gates	Ashley Waters	Tommy Ward	Christine Lewis-Napolitano	Wesley Kavanagh	Devon St. Denis-Richard (NOTA)	Wayne Gates
Niagara West	Sam Oosterhoff	Dave Augustyn	Doug Joyner	Laura Garner	Chris Arnew	Dan Dale	Stefanos Karatopis (Libert.)	Sam Oosterhoff
Niagara West	Sam Oosterhoff	Dave Augustyn	Doug Joyner	Laura Garner	Chris Arnew	Dan Dale	**Jim Torma** (PPO)	Sam Oosterhoff
St. Catharines	Sal Sorrento	Jennie Stevens	Ryan Madill	Michele Braniff	Keith McDonald	Michael Goddard	Judi Falardeau (Libert.)	Jennie Stevens
St. Catharines	Sal Sorrento	Jennie Stevens	Ryan Madill	Michele Braniff	Keith McDonald	Michael Goddard	J. Justin O'Donnell (All)	Jennie Stevens
St. Catharines	Sal Sorrento	Jennie Stevens	Ryan Madill	Michele Braniff	Keith McDonald	Michael Goddard	Rin Simon (Comm.)	Jennie Stevens

=== Midwestern Ontario ===
Electoral district	Candidates							Incumbent
Electoral district	PC	NDP	Liberal	Green	New Blue	Ontario Party	Other	Incumbent
Brantford—Brant	Will Bouma	Harvey Bischof	Ruby Toor	Karleigh Csordas	Tad Brudzinski	Allan Wilson	Leslie Bory (CCP)	Will Bouma
Brantford—Brant	Will Bouma	Harvey Bischof	Ruby Toor	Karleigh Csordas	Tad Brudzinski	Allan Wilson	Rob Ferguson (Libert.)	Will Bouma
Brantford—Brant	Will Bouma	Harvey Bischof	Ruby Toor	Karleigh Csordas	Tad Brudzinski	Allan Wilson	John Turmel (Ind.)	Will Bouma
Cambridge	Brian Riddell	Marjorie Knight	Surekha Shenoy	Carla Johnson	Belinda Karahalios			Belinda Karahalios
Guelph	Peter McSherry	James Parr	Raechelle Devereaux	**Mike Schreiner**	Will Lomker		Juanita Burnett (Comm.)	**Mike Schreiner**
Guelph	Peter McSherry	James Parr	Raechelle Devereaux	**Mike Schreiner**	Will Lomker		Paul Taylor (NOTA)	**Mike Schreiner**
Haldimand—Norfolk	Ken Hewitt	Sarah Lowe	Aziz Chouhdery	Erik Coverdale	Nate Hawkins	Sheldon Simpson	Bobbi Ann Brady (Ind.)	Toby Barrett $
Haldimand—Norfolk	Ken Hewitt	Sarah Lowe	Aziz Chouhdery	Erik Coverdale	Nate Hawkins	Sheldon Simpson	George McMorrow (Ind.)	Toby Barrett $
Haldimand—Norfolk	Ken Hewitt	Sarah Lowe	Aziz Chouhdery	Erik Coverdale	Nate Hawkins	Sheldon Simpson	Thecla Ross (FPO)	Toby Barrett $
Huron—Bruce	Lisa Thompson	Laurie Hazzard	Shelley Blackmore	Matthew Van Ankum	Matt Kennedy	Gerrie Huenemoerder	Bruce Eisen (All)	Lisa Thompson
Huron—Bruce	Lisa Thompson	Laurie Hazzard	Shelley Blackmore	Matthew Van Ankum	Matt Kennedy	Gerrie Huenemoerder	Ronald Stephens (Ind.)	Lisa Thompson
Kitchener Centre	Jim Schmidt	Laura Mae Lindo	Kelly Steiss	Wayne Mak	Peter Beimers			Laura Mae Lindo
Kitchener—Conestoga	Mike Harris Jr.	Karen Meissner	Melanie Van Alphen	Nasir Abdulle	**Jim Karahalios**	Elisabeth Perrin Snyder	Jason Adair (PPO)	Mike Harris Jr.
Kitchener South—Hespeler	Jess Dixon	Joanne Weston	Ismail Mohamed	David Weber	John Teat	David Gillies		Amy Fee †
Oxford	Ernie Hardeman	Lindsay Wilson	Mary Holmes	Cheryle Rose Baker	Connie Oldenburger	Karl Toews		Ernie Hardeman
Perth—Wellington	Matthew Rae	Jo-Dee Burbach	Ashley Fox	Laura Bisutti	Bob Hosken	Sandy William MacGregor	Robby Smink (FPO)	Randy Pettapiece $
Waterloo	Andrew Aitken	Catherine Fife	Jennifer Tuck	Shefaza Esmail	Vladimir Voznyuk	Benjamin Hufnagel	**Peter House** (ERP)	Catherine Fife
Waterloo	Andrew Aitken	Catherine Fife	Jennifer Tuck	Shefaza Esmail	Vladimir Voznyuk	Benjamin Hufnagel	Christian Shingiro (Comm.)	Catherine Fife
Wellington—Halton Hills	Ted Arnott	Diane Ballantyne	Tom Takacs	Ryan Kahro	Stephen Kitras		Ron Patava (Consen.)	Ted Arnott

=== Southwestern Ontario ===
Electoral district	Candidates							Incumbent
Electoral district	PC	NDP	Liberal	Green	New Blue	Ontario Party	Other	Incumbent
Chatham-Kent—Leamington	Trevor Jones	Brock McGregor		Jennifer Surerus	Rhonda Jubenville	Rick Nicholls		Rick Nicholls
Elgin—Middlesex—London	Rob Flack	Andy Kroeker	Heather Jackson	Amanda Stark	Matt Millar	Brigitte Belton	Malichi Malé (Consen.)	Vacant
Elgin—Middlesex—London	Rob Flack	Andy Kroeker	Heather Jackson	Amanda Stark	Matt Millar	Brigitte Belton	Dave Plumb (FPO)	Vacant
Essex	Anthony Leardi	Ron LeClair	Manpreet Brar	Nicholas Wendler	Danielle Sylvester	Frank Causarano	Kevin Linfield (NOTA)	Taras Natyshak †
Lambton—Kent—Middlesex	Monte McNaughton	Vanessa Benoit	Bruce Baker	Wanda Dickey	David Barnwell	Aaron Istvan Vegh	Dean Eve (NOTA)	Monte McNaughton
London—Fanshawe	Jane Kovarikova	Teresa Armstrong	Zeba Hashmi	Zack Ramsey	Adriana A. Medina	Doug Macdonald	Stephen R. Campbell (NOTA)	Teresa Armstrong
London—Fanshawe	Jane Kovarikova	Teresa Armstrong	Zeba Hashmi	Zack Ramsey	Adriana A. Medina	Doug Macdonald	Dave Durnin (FPO)	Teresa Armstrong
London—Fanshawe	Jane Kovarikova	Teresa Armstrong	Zeba Hashmi	Zack Ramsey	Adriana A. Medina	Doug Macdonald	T. Paul Plumb (Consen.)	Teresa Armstrong
London North Centre	Jerry Pribil	Terence Kernaghan	Kate Graham	Carol Dyck	Tommy Caldwell	Darrel Grant	George Le Mac (Consen.)	Terence Kernaghan
London North Centre	Jerry Pribil	Terence Kernaghan	Kate Graham	Carol Dyck	Tommy Caldwell	Darrel Grant	**Paul McKeever** (FPO)	Terence Kernaghan
London West	Paul Paolatto	Peggy Sattler	Vanessa Lalonde	Colleen McCauley	Kristopher Hunt	Cynthia Workman	Jacques Y. Boudreau (Libert.)	Peggy Sattler
London West	Paul Paolatto	Peggy Sattler	Vanessa Lalonde	Colleen McCauley	Kristopher Hunt	Cynthia Workman	**Brad Harness** (Consen.)	Peggy Sattler
London West	Paul Paolatto	Peggy Sattler	Vanessa Lalonde	Colleen McCauley	Kristopher Hunt	Cynthia Workman	Mike McMullen (FPO)	Peggy Sattler
Sarnia—Lambton	Bob Bailey	Dylan Stelpstra	Mark Russell	Mason Bourdeau	Keith Benn	Ian Orchard	Carla Olson (PPO)	Bob Bailey
Windsor—Tecumseh	Andrew Dowie	Gemma Grey-Hall	Gary Kaschak	Melissa Coulbeck	Sophia Sevo	Steven Gifford	Giovanni Abati (Ind.)	Percy Hatfield †
Windsor—Tecumseh	Andrew Dowie	Gemma Grey-Hall	Gary Kaschak	Melissa Coulbeck	Sophia Sevo	Steven Gifford	Nick Babic (Ind.)	Percy Hatfield †
Windsor—Tecumseh	Andrew Dowie	Gemma Grey-Hall	Gary Kaschak	Melissa Coulbeck	Sophia Sevo	Steven Gifford	Laura Chesnik (Ind.)	Percy Hatfield †
Windsor—Tecumseh	Andrew Dowie	Gemma Grey-Hall	Gary Kaschak	Melissa Coulbeck	Sophia Sevo	Steven Gifford	David Sylvestre (NOTA)	Percy Hatfield †
Windsor West	John Leontowicz	Lisa Gretzky	Linda L McCurdy	Krysta Glovasky-Ridsdale	Joshua Griffin	Jeremy Palko		Lisa Gretzky

=== Northern Ontario ===
==== Northeastern Ontario ====
Electoral district	Candidates							Incumbent
Electoral district	PC	NDP	Liberal	Green	New Blue	Ontario Party	Other	Incumbent
Algoma—Manitoulin	Cheryl Fort	Michael Mantha	Tim Vine	Maria Legault	Ron Koski	Frederick Weening		Michael Mantha
Mushkegowuk—James Bay	Eric Côté	Guy Bourgouin	Matthew Pronovost	Catherine Jones	Michael Buckley		Fauzia Sadiq (PCRP)	Guy Bourgouin
Nickel Belt	Randy Hazlett	France Gélinas	Gilles Proulx	Glenys Babcock	Melanie Savoie	Willy Schneider		France Gélinas
Nipissing	Vic Fedeli	Erika Lougheed	Tanya Vrebosch	Sean McClocklin	Taylor Russell	Joe Jobin	Michelle Lashbrook (Libert.)	Vic Fedeli
Nipissing	Vic Fedeli	Erika Lougheed	Tanya Vrebosch	Sean McClocklin	Taylor Russell	Joe Jobin	Giacomo Vezina (NOTA)	Vic Fedeli
Parry Sound—Muskoka	Graydon Smith	Erin Horvath		Matt Richter	Doug Maynard	Andrew John Cocks	Daniel Predie Jr.(Ind.)	Norm Miller $
Parry Sound—Muskoka	Graydon Smith	Erin Horvath		Matt Richter	Doug Maynard	Andrew John Cocks	Brad Waddell (PPO)	Norm Miller $
Sault Ste. Marie	Ross Romano	Michele McCleave-Kennedy	Liam Hancock	Keagan Gilfillan	S. Pankhurst		Naomi Sayers (Ind.)	Ross Romano
Sudbury	Marc Despatie	Jamie West	David Farrow	David Robinson	Sheldon Pressey	Jason Laface	Adrien Berthier (Libert.)	Jamie West
Sudbury	Marc Despatie	Jamie West	David Farrow	David Robinson	Sheldon Pressey	Jason Laface	J. David Popescu (Ind.)	Jamie West
Timiskaming—Cochrane	Bill Foy	John Vanthof	Brian Johnson	Kris Rivard	Garry Andrade	Geoffrey Aitchison	Eric Cummings (Libert.)	John Vanthof
Timiskaming—Cochrane	Bill Foy	John Vanthof	Brian Johnson	Kris Rivard	Garry Andrade	Geoffrey Aitchison	Jeff Wilkinson (NOTA)	John Vanthof
Timmins	George Pirie	Gilles Bisson		Elizabeth Lockhard	David Farrell		Nadia Sadiq (PCRP)	Gilles Bisson

==== Northwestern Ontario ====
Electoral district	Candidates								Incumbent
Electoral district	PC	NDP	Liberal	Green	New Blue	Ontario Party	Consensus	Other	Incumbent
Kenora—Rainy River	Greg Rickford	JoAnne Formanek Gustafson	Anthony Leek	Catherine Kiewning	Kelvin Boucher-Chicago	Larry Breiland	Richard A. Jonasson	Mi'Azhikwan (Ind.)	Greg Rickford
Kiiwetinoong	Dwight Monck	Sol Mamakwa	Manuela Michelizzi	Suzette A. Foster	Alex Dornn				Sol Mamakwa
Thunder Bay—Atikokan	Kevin Holland	Judith Monteith-Farrell	Rob Barrett	Eric Arner	David Tommasini	Dan Criger		Kenneth Jones (N. Ont)	Judith Monteith-Farrell
Thunder Bay—Superior North	Peng You	Lise Vaugeois	Shelby Ch’ng	Tracey Allison MacKinnon	Katherine Suutari	Stephen Hufnagel	Adam Cherry	Andy Wolff (N. Ont)	Michael Gravelle
