= List of political parties in Ontario =

The following is a list of political parties in Ontario, Canada.

== Parties represented in the Legislative Assembly of Ontario ==
Name	Founded	Ideology	Political position	Membership	Leader	MPPs
Progressive Conservative	1854	Conservatism	Centre-right	64,053 (2018)	Doug Ford	79 / 124
New Democratic	1961	Social democracy	Centre-left	52,200 (2017)	Marit Stiles	27 / 124
Liberal	1857	Liberalism	Centre	56,996 (2026)	Navdeep Bains	14 / 124
Green	1983	Green politics	Centre-left		Mike Schreiner	2 / 124

== Other parties registered with Elections Ontario ==
Name	Founded	Ideology	Membership	Leader	Notes
Canadians' Choice Party; Le Parti du choix des Canadiens et Canadiennes	2011	Right-wing populism, far-right politics		Bahman Yazdanfar	
Communist Party of Canada (Ontario); Parti communiste du Canada (Ontario)	1940	Communism		Dave McKee	Known as the Labor-Progressive Party from 1941 to 1949. Had two MPPs from 1943 to 1951, and one from 1951 to 1955.
Electoral Reform Party	2022	Electoral reform		Peter House	
Freedom Party of Ontario; Parti de la Liberté – Ontario	1984	Objectivism		Paul McKeever	
New Blue Party of Ontario; Nouveau Parti Bleu de l'Ontario	2020	Right-wing populism		Jim Karahalios	Briefly held one seat in the legislature from 2020–2022 after PC MPP Belinda Karahalios crossed the floor to the party.
None of the Above Direct Democracy Party; Aucune de ces Réponses Démocratie Directe Parti	2014	Direct democracy		Greg Vezina	
Northern Ontario Party; Parti de l'Ontario Nord	1977	Regionalism	300 (2018)	Jacques Ouellette	Known as Northern Ontario Heritage Party from 1977–1985, 2010–2016, Disbanded in 1985, Revived in 2010, Separatist from 2016–2018
Ontario Alliance; Alliance de l'Ontario	2017	Social conservatism, Right-wing populism		Joshua E. Eriksen	
Ontario Centrist Party	2022	Centrism		Mansoor Qureshi	
Ontario Libertarian Party; Parti libertarien de l'Ontario	1974	Libertarianism	<600 (2018)	Sean Conroy	
Ontario Party; Parti Ontario	2018	Social conservatism Right-wing populism		Derek Sloan	Briefly held one seat in the legislature from 2021–2022 after PC MPP Rick Nicholls joined the party. The party was deregistered from 2023–2024
Ontario Moderate Party	2014	Centrism; Economic liberalism		Yuri Duboisky	
Party for People with Special Needs; Parti pour les gens qui ont des besoins spéciaux	2007	Disability rights activism, Single-issue politics		Lionel Wayne Poizner	
Populist Party Ontario; Parti Populiste Ontario	2022	Populism		Jim Torma	
Progress Party Ontario; Parti Progrès de l'Ontario	2025			Sara Forsyth	
Stop the New Sex-Ed Agenda	2016	Social conservatism, Single-issue politics		John Kanary	

Parties listed in the order they are alphabetized by Elections Ontario.

== Unregistered parties ==
- League for Socialist Action
- North American Labour Party
- Ontario Humanist Party
- Socialist Party of Ontario

== Historical parties that held seats in the Legislative Assembly ==
- Co-operative Commonwealth Federation (first election 1934) 1932–1961
- (Independent) Labour 1874–1937
- Labor-Progressive Party 1941 – 1959
- Liberal-Labour 1943–1970s
- Liberal-Progressive 1934–1940
- Soldier 1919–1923
- Trillium Party of Ontario 2017–2018
- Patrons of Industry 1894
- Protestant Protective Association 1894
- United Farmers of Ontario 1918–1940

== Pre-Confederation parties ==
- Clear Grits (pre-Confederation)
- Reform Party (pre-Confederation)
- Family Compact (pre-1837 ruling clique)

Cornell, Paul G. "The Genesis of Ontario politics in the Province of Canada (1838–1871)," in Profiles of a Province: studies in Ontario History, (Toronto: Ontario Historical Society, 1987), 59–72.

== Other historical parties ==
Name	Period	Ideology	Notes
Canadian Economic Party	2018–2019	Basic income advocacy, Single-issue politics	
Consensus Ontario	2018–2025	Populism, Non-partisan consensus government	
Cultural Action Party of Ontario	2016–2018		Known as Canadian Constituents' Party from 2016–2017
Equal Parenting Party	2014–2018	Father's rights	
Family Rights Party	2024–2025	Family rights	
Freedom of Choice, Peace & Justice Party	2022–2025		
Go Vegan	2011-before 2022 election	Environmentalism, Animal rights	
Natural Law Party of Ontario	1993–2000	Pro-Transcendental Meditation	
New Reform Party of Ontario	1987–2016		Known as Family Coalition Party of Ontario from 1987–2015
Multicultural Party of Ontario; Parti Multiculturel de l'Ontario	2018-before 2022 election	Single-issue politics	
Ontario Provincial Confederation of Regions Party	1989–2025	Conservatism, Canadian nationalism, Anti-bilingualism	
Ontario Social Reform Party	2018–2019	Populism	
Parliamentary Freedom Party	2018–2019		
Party for Human Rights in Ontario	2011		
Party of Objective Truth	2018–2019	Meritocracy	
Pauper Party of Ontario; Parti Pauvre de l'Ontario	2011-before 2022 election	Social credit, Libertarianism	
People First Republican Party of Ontario	2007–2019	Big Tent, Grassroots democracy, Republicanism	
People's Progressive Common Front of Ontario	2022–2025		
Public Benefit Party of Ontario	2022–2025		
Reform Party of Ontario	1989–2015	Right-wing populism, Social conservatism	
Representative Party of Ontario	2005	Right-wing populism, Social conservatism	A faction of the Reform Party that existed in 2005
Social Credit Party of Ontario/Union of Electors	1945–1985	Social credit, Social conservatism	
Stop Climate Change; Arrêtons le Changement Climatique	2018-before 2022 election	Environmentalism, Single-issue politics	
The New People's Choice Party of Ontario	2017–2019	Left-wing populism	
The Peoples Political Party	2011–2023	Left-wing populism	
The Only Party	2011		
Unparty	1980–1983	Objectivism	Succeeded by Freedom Party of Ontario

=== Toronto municipal parties ===
Name	Period
Toronto Party	2007
Civic Action (CIVAC)	1969
Metro New Democratic Party	1969-1990s
Civic Liberals	1969

== See also ==
- List of Ontario general elections
- Elections Ontario
