= Kitchener South—Hespeler =

Kitchener South—Hespeler could refer to:

- Kitchener South—Hespeler (federal electoral district)
- Kitchener South—Hespeler (provincial electoral district)
