= Mississauga—Erin Mills =

Mississauga—Erin Mills could refer to:

- Mississauga—Erin Mills (federal electoral district)
- Mississauga—Erin Mills (provincial electoral district)
