= Paul Vickers (politician) =

Canadian politician

Paul Vickers MPP
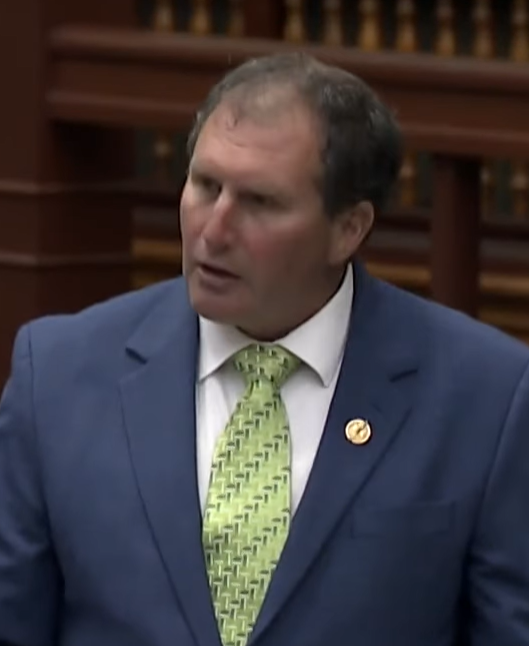
- Vickers in 2025

Member of the Ontario Provincial Parliament for Bruce—Grey—Owen Sound
- Incumbent
- Assumed office February 27, 2025
- Preceded by: Rick Byers

Personal details
- Born: Meaford, Ontario
- Party: Progressive Conservative

Paul Vickers born 1966 is a Canadian politician who is the member of the Legislative Assembly of Ontario (MPP) for Bruce—Grey—Owen Sound, after winning the seat in the 2025 Ontario general election. He is a Progressive Conservative.

== Career ==
Vickers is a dairy farmer from Meaford, Ontario. He was a municipal councillor there from 2018 to 2022.

In January 2025, he was selected to be the candidate to replace retiring MPP Rick Byers.

== Personal life ==
Born in Meaford, Ontario, Vickers and his wife Karen have four children.

== Electoral record ==
2025 Ontario general election: Bruce—Grey—Owen Sound
Party	Candidate	Votes	%	±%
Progressive Conservative	Paul Vickers	20,158	44.14	–4.42
Liberal	Selwyn J. Hicks	13,445	29.44	+9.11
Green	Joel Loughead	5,693	12.47	+3.62
New Democratic	James Harris	3,611	7.91	–6.00
Stop the New Sex-Ed Agenda	Ann Gillies	1,006	2.20	N/A
New Blue	Vincent Grimaldi	930	2.04	–0.66
Libertarian	Michael Butt	681	1.49	N/A
Ontario Alliance	Matt Fritz	148	0.32	N/A
Total valid votes/expense limit		45,670	99.04	–0.09
Total rejected, unmarked, and declined ballots		443	0.96	+0.09
Turnout		46,113	50.79	+3.77
Eligible voters		90,795		
Progressive Conservative hold		Swing		–6.77
Source: Elections Ontario
