= Bruce—Grey—Owen Sound (provincial electoral district) =

Provincial electoral district in Ontario, Canada

Coordinates: 44.52°N 81.14°W

Ontario electoral district
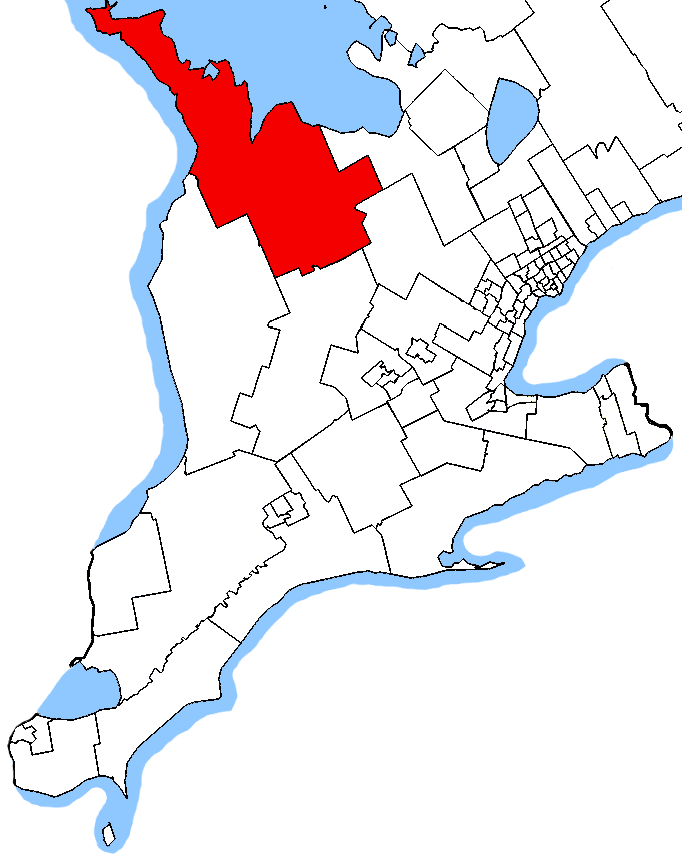
- Bruce—Grey—Owen Sound in relation to other southwestern Ontario electoral districts

Provincial electoral district
- Legislature: Legislative Assembly of Ontario
MPP
Paul Vickers
Progressive Conservative
- District created: 1999
- First contested: 1999
- Last contested: 2025

Demographics
- Population (2016): 107,675
- Electors (2018): 85,044
- Area (km²): 9,901
- Pop. density (per km²): 10.9
- Census division(s): Bruce County, Ontario, Grey County, Ontario
- Census subdivision(s): West Grey, Hanover, Chatsworth, Meaford, Owen Sound, Georgian Bluffs, Arran-Elderslie, South Bruce Peninsula, Northern Bruce Peninsula, Neyaashiinigmiing, Saugeen 29, Southgate, Grey Highlands

Bruce—Grey—Owen Sound is a provincial electoral district in western Ontario, Canada. It elects one member to the Legislative Assembly of Ontario.

It was created in 1999 from parts of Bruce and Grey when ridings in Ontario were redistributed to match their federal counterparts.

The riding from 1999 to 2007 included the municipalities of West Grey, Hanover, Chatsworth, Meaford, Owen Sound, Georgian Bluffs, Arran-Elderslie, South Bruce Peninsula, Northern Bruce Peninsula, Neyaashiinigmiing, Saugeen 29, plus the eastern half of Brockton and South Bruce plus the northern third of Grey Highlands.

In 2007, the riding gained the municipality of Southgate, the rest of Grey Highlands, but lost the parts of Brockton and South Bruce in the riding.

The riding is notable for running a Green Party of Ontario candidate who received 33.1% of the popular vote in the 2007 election, one of largest shares of the popular vote the party has ever received in a single riding.

== Members ==
Bruce—Grey—Owen Sound
Assembly	Years	Member	Party
Riding created from Bruce and Grey
37th	1999–2003	Bill Murdoch	Progressive Conservative
38th	2003–2007	Bill Murdoch	Progressive Conservative
39th	2007–2011	Bill Murdoch	Progressive Conservative
40th	2011–2014	Bill Walker	Progressive Conservative
41st	2014–2018	Bill Walker	Progressive Conservative
42nd	2018–2022	Bill Walker	Progressive Conservative
43rd	2022–2025	Rick Byers	Progressive Conservative
44th	2025–present	Paul Vickers	Progressive Conservative

== Election results ==
Graph of election results in Bruce—Grey—Owen Sound (minor parties that do not run consistently are omitted)

Winning party in each polling division of Bruce—Grey—Owen Sound at the 2025 Ontario general election

2025 Ontario general election
Party	Candidate	Votes	%	±%
Progressive Conservative	Paul Vickers	20,158	44.14	–4.42
Liberal	Selwyn Hicks	13,445	29.44	+9.11
Green	Joel Loughead	5,693	12.46	+3.61
New Democratic	James Harris	3,611	7.91	–6.01
Stop the New Sex-Ed Agenda	Ann Gillies	1,006	2.20	–
New Blue	Vincent Grimaldi	930	2.04	–0.67
Libertarian	Michael Butt	681	1.49	–
Ontario Alliance	Matt Fritz	148	0.32	–
Total valid votes		45,672	99.04	
Total rejected, unmarked and declined ballots		443	0.96	+0.09
Turnout		46,115	49.97	+2.95
Eligible voters		92,278		
Progressive Conservative hold		Swing		–6.77
Source: Elections Ontario

Winning party in each polling division of Bruce—Grey—Owen Sound at the 2022 Ontario general election

2022 Ontario general election
Party	Candidate	Votes	%	±%
Progressive Conservative	Rick Byers	20,304	48.56	–6.14
Liberal	Selwyn J. Hicks	8,499	20.33	+8.03
New Democratic	Karen Gventer	5,817	13.91	–10.18
Green	Danielle Valiquette	3,702	8.85	+2.90
Ontario Party	Suzanne Coles	1,680	4.02	–
New Blue	Vince Grimaldi	1,130	2.70	–
Populist	Joseph Westover	248	0.59	–
None of the Above	Joel Loughead	230	0.55	–
Independent	Reima Kaikkonen	201	0.48	–
Total valid votes		41,811	99.13	
Total rejected, unmarked and declined ballots		369	0.87	–0.19
Turnout		42,180	47.02	–11.37
Eligible voters		89,703		
Progressive Conservative hold		Swing		–7.09
Source: Elections Ontario

2018 Ontario general election
Party	Candidate	Votes	%	±%
Progressive Conservative	Bill Walker	26,874	54.70	+7.15
New Democratic	Karen Gventer	11,837	24.09	+8.24
Liberal	Francesca Dobbyn	6,041	12.30	–14.76
Green	Don B. Marshall	2,927	5.96	–2.67
Trillium	Elizabeth (Liz) Marshall	552	1.12	–
Alliance	Enos Martin	442	0.90	–
Consensus Ontario	Janice Kaikkonen	261	0.53	–
Libertarian	Jay Miller	194	0.39	–0.04
Total valid votes		49,128	98.94	
Total rejected, unmarked and declined ballots		527	1.06	–0.50
Turnout		49,655	58.39	+4.45
Eligible voters		85,044		
Progressive Conservative hold		Swing		–0.55
Source: Elections Ontario

2014 Ontario general election
Party	Candidate	Votes	%	±%
Progressive Conservative	Bill Walker	20,359	47.55	+0.18
Liberal	Ellen Anderson	11,586	27.06	+0.70
New Democratic	Karen Gventer	6,787	15.85	+1.00
Green	Jenny Parsons	3,696	8.63	+2.21
Freedom	Jamie D. Spence	200	0.47	–
Libertarian	Caleb Voskamp	188	0.44	–0.16
Total valid votes		42,816	98.44	
Total rejected, unmarked and declined ballots		680	1.56	+1.17
Turnout		43,496	53.93	–0.77
Eligible voters		80,646		
Progressive Conservative hold		Swing		–0.26
Source: Elections Ontario

2011 Ontario general election
Party	Candidate	Votes	%	±%
Progressive Conservative	Bill Walker	19,567	47.37	+0.76
Liberal	Kevin Eccles	10,889	26.36	+11.44
New Democratic	Paul Johnstone	6,133	14.85	+11.06
Green	Don Marshall	2,654	6.43	–26.71
Independent	Shane Jolley	1,478	3.58	–29.56
Family Coalition	Joel Kidd	339	0.82	–0.39
Libertarian	Jay Miller	246	0.60	–
Total valid votes		41,306	99.60	
Total rejected, unmarked and declined ballots		164	0.40	–0.14
Turnout		41,470	54.70	–5.25
Eligible voters		75,809		
Progressive Conservative hold		Swing		–5.34
Source: Elections Ontario

2007 Ontario general election
Party	Candidate	Votes	%	±%
Progressive Conservative	Bill Murdoch	21,156	46.61	–5.46
Green	Shane Jolley	15,039	33.14	+31.42
Liberal	Selwyn Hicks	6,774	14.93	–18.28
New Democratic	Paul Johnstone	1,721	3.79	–5.49
Family Coalition	Irma Nicolette DeVries	550	1.21	–1.21
Reform	William (Bill) Cook	145	0.32	–0.99
Total valid votes		45,385	99.47	
Total rejected, unmarked and declined ballots		243	0.53	+0.05
Turnout		45,628	59.96	–2.94
Eligible voters		76,102		
Progressive Conservative hold		Swing		–18.44
Source: Elections Ontario

2003 Ontario general election
Party	Candidate	Votes	%	±%
Progressive Conservative	Bill Murdoch	23,338	52.07	–2.40
Liberal	Dave Hocking	14,881	33.20	–2.08
New Democratic	Colleen Anne Purdon	4,159	9.28	+3.21
Family Coalition	Linda Freiburger	1,086	2.42	–0.94
Green	Martin Donald	769	1.72	+0.90
Independent	William (Bill) Cook	586	1.31	–
Total valid votes		44,819	99.51	
Total rejected, unmarked and declined ballots		219	0.49	+0.01
Turnout		45,038	62.90	+0.90
Eligible voters		71,606		
Progressive Conservative hold		Swing		–0.16
Source: Elections Ontario

1999 Ontario general election
Party	Candidate	Votes	%
Progressive Conservative	Bill Murdoch	24,915	54.47
Liberal	Ruth Lovell	16,139	35.28
New Democratic	Colleen Anne Purdon	2,776	6.07
Family Coalition	John Clark	1,540	3.37
Green	Grant Pattullo	373	0.82
Total valid votes		45,743	99.52
Total rejected, unmarked and declined ballots		220	0.48
Turnout		45,963	61.99
Eligible voters		74,142	
Progressive Conservative pickup new district.			
Source: Elections Ontario

== 2007 electoral reform referendum ==
2007 Ontario electoral reform referendum
Side	Votes	%
First Past the Post	27,617	63.0
Mixed member proportional	16,199	37.0
Total valid votes	43,816	100.0

== See also ==
- List of Ontario provincial electoral districts
- Canadian provincial electoral districts
