= Fitz Vanderpool =

Canadian boxer

Fitzroy "Fitz the Whip" Vanderpool is a Canadian former professional boxer. He is one of Canada's most decorated professional champions, holding six titles. Born November 3, 1967, in Trinidad and Tobago, he moved to Canada at the age of six with his family. Coming from a family of five boys who were all boxers, life was always competitive in the Vanderpool household. This gave Vanderpool the hope, dream and drive to become a professional world boxing champion.

== Professional Titles ==
- 1996 Apr Canadian Professional Boxing Federation
- 1997 Apr World Boxing Federation Intercontinental
- 1998 Nov World Boxing Council Welterweight Fecarbox
- 1999 Apr World Boxing Federation Superwelterweight World
- 2002 Mar World Boxing Council Superwelterweight Fecarbox
- 2013 Mar National Boxing Authority Middleweight

== Out of Retirement ==
Vanderpool retired in 2005 with a 24-7-4 professional boxing record with 13 knockouts. He had won five national and international titles during his professional career. In March 2013, after a 7.5-year hiatus from professional boxing, Fitz came back to win the National Boxing Authority championship defeating an opponent 17 years younger, achieving his 6th professional national title. The victory made Fitz the oldest Canadian Champion in history - succeeding George Chuvalo - and a three-division boxing champion at 45 years of age. Vanderpool came out of retirement and won a six-round decision over Phil Rose on Sept 15, 2012, in Ontario, Canada. In a second comeback bout at 45 years of age, Vanderpool won a ten-round unanimous decision over Roberto McClellan on March 2, 2013, to win the vacant Canada National Boxing Authority NBA Middleweight title in New Brunswick, Canada, making him the oldest ever Canadian national boxing champion. George Chuvalo was 43 years old when he retained the Canadian Heavyweight title over George Jerome in Toronto in December 1978. The NBA Middleweight title is a new Canadian belt.

== Later career ==
Fitz announced his retirement "for good" from professional boxing on January 4, 2014, during the grand opening of the new location for Vanderpool Fitness with special guest George Chuvalo passing the torch for the oldest Canadian boxing champion. But the recognition of his abilities did not end here. In 2016, Fitz was inducted into the Ontario Boxing Hall of Fame, he was awarded the Rochester Boxing Hall of Fame (Courage Award), and he received the Service Award from the National Boxing Authority Hall of Fame.

In January 2018, he was selected as the Ontario New Democratic Party candidate for the riding of Kitchener South—Hespeler in the 2018 Ontario general election. He finished a close second to the winning candidate, Amy Fee.

He is currently a candidate for Ward 5 Kitchener in the upcoming 2026 Ontario municipal elections.

== Accomplishments ==
- 1996 Named International Fire Safety Ambassador
- 1998 Kitchener-Waterloo Inaugural 'Athlete of the Year'
- 2003 Recognition for Outstanding Contribution toward Fire Safety by Int.Fire Ambassadors
- 2006 Eastwood Collegiate's Wall of Recognition
- 2008 Inducted into the Waterloo County Sports Hall of Fame
- 2011 Induction as a 'Legend' - Boxing Ontario
- 2015 Named 'National Ambassador' for StopBully.com
- 2016 Community Service Award - NBA Canadian Boxing Hall of Fame
- 2016 Inducted into Ontario Boxing Hall of Fame
- 2016 'Courage Award' - Rochester Boxing Hall of Fame
- 2017 RBG Flag Ambassador
- 2018 Candidate for Provincial Parliament
- 2018 Candidate for City Council
- 2019 Jackie Robinson 'Fortitude Award'

== Endeavours ==
- Owner & president of Vanderpool Fitness & Boxing since 2003, a successful boxing gym located in Waterloo, Ontario
- Facilitator and head coach for The WHIP Boxing Academy
- Founder of WHIPYIT (With Hope It's Possible Youth in Transition) Non-Profit Organization. WHIPYIT was founded to deliver programs to build strength, confidence and emotional well-being for youth in transition
- Inspirational Speaker for youth, engaging and motivating them With Hope It's Possible to set goals, chase their dreams and to never give up.
- Co-authored the book 'The Whip' with Sandra Cole. (produced by Waterloo Region law firm Morell Kelly). This inspirational book shows how anyone can chase their dream and succeed, even when the odds are stacked against you. Fitz is available to speak to audiences about his Championship journey and autograph his book after his presentations.

== Professional record ==
Record
Won 26(KOs 13)	Lost 7	Drawn 4	Total 37
