= Bill Walker (Canadian politician) =

Canadian politician

The Honourable Bill Walker ECO MPP
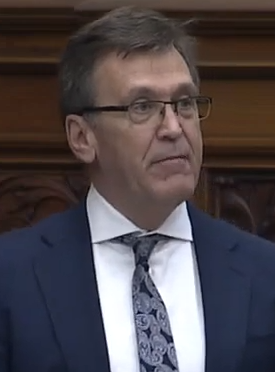
- Walker in 2021

Deputy Speaker of the Legislative Assembly of Ontario
- In office October 5, 2021 – May 3, 2022
- Speaker: Ted Arnott
- Preceded by: Rick Nicholls
- Succeeded by: Donna Skelly

Associate Minister of Energy
- In office June 20, 2019 – June 18, 2021
- Premier: Doug Ford
- Preceded by: Position established
- Succeeded by: Position abolished

Minister of Government and Consumer Services
- In office November 5, 2018 – June 20, 2019
- Premier: Doug Ford
- Preceded by: Todd Smith
- Succeeded by: Lisa Thompson

Government Chief Whip
- In office July 6, 2018 – November 5, 2018
- Premier: Doug Ford
- Preceded by: Jim Bradley
- Succeeded by: Lorne Coe

Member of the Ontario Provincial Parliament for Bruce—Grey—Owen Sound
- In office October 6, 2011 – May 3, 2022
- Preceded by: Bill Murdoch
- Succeeded by: Rick Byers

Personal details
- Born: 1966 (age 59–60) Hepworth, Ontario
- Party: Progressive Conservative Party of Ontario
- Occupation: Health-care executive

William Harold Leonard Walker (born c. 1966) is a politician in Ontario, Canada. He was a Progressive Conservative member of the Legislative Assembly of Ontario who represented the riding of Bruce—Grey—Owen Sound between 2011 and 2022.

== Background ==
Walker was born and raised in Hepworth, Ontario. He was an executive in the health-care industry and also worked for Bruce Power.

== Politics ==
Walker ran in the 2011 provincial election as the Progressive Conservative candidate in the riding of Bruce—Grey—Owen Sound. He defeated Liberal candidate Kevin Eccles by 8,678 votes. He was re-elected in the 2014 provincial election defeating Liberal candidate Ellen Anderson by 8,773 votes.

He served as the party's critic for Community and Social Services.

On July 6, 2018, he was appointed Chief Government Whip.

Ford ministry, Province of Ontario (2018–present)
Cabinet post (1)
Predecessor	Office	Successor
Todd Smith	Minister of Government and Consumer Services; November 5, 2018 - June 20, 2019	Lisa Thompson
Special Parliamentary Responsibilities
Predecessor	Title	Successor
Jim Bradley	Chief Government Whip; July 6, 2018 – November 5. 2018	Lorne Coe
