= Amy Fee =

Canadian politician

Amy Fee MPP
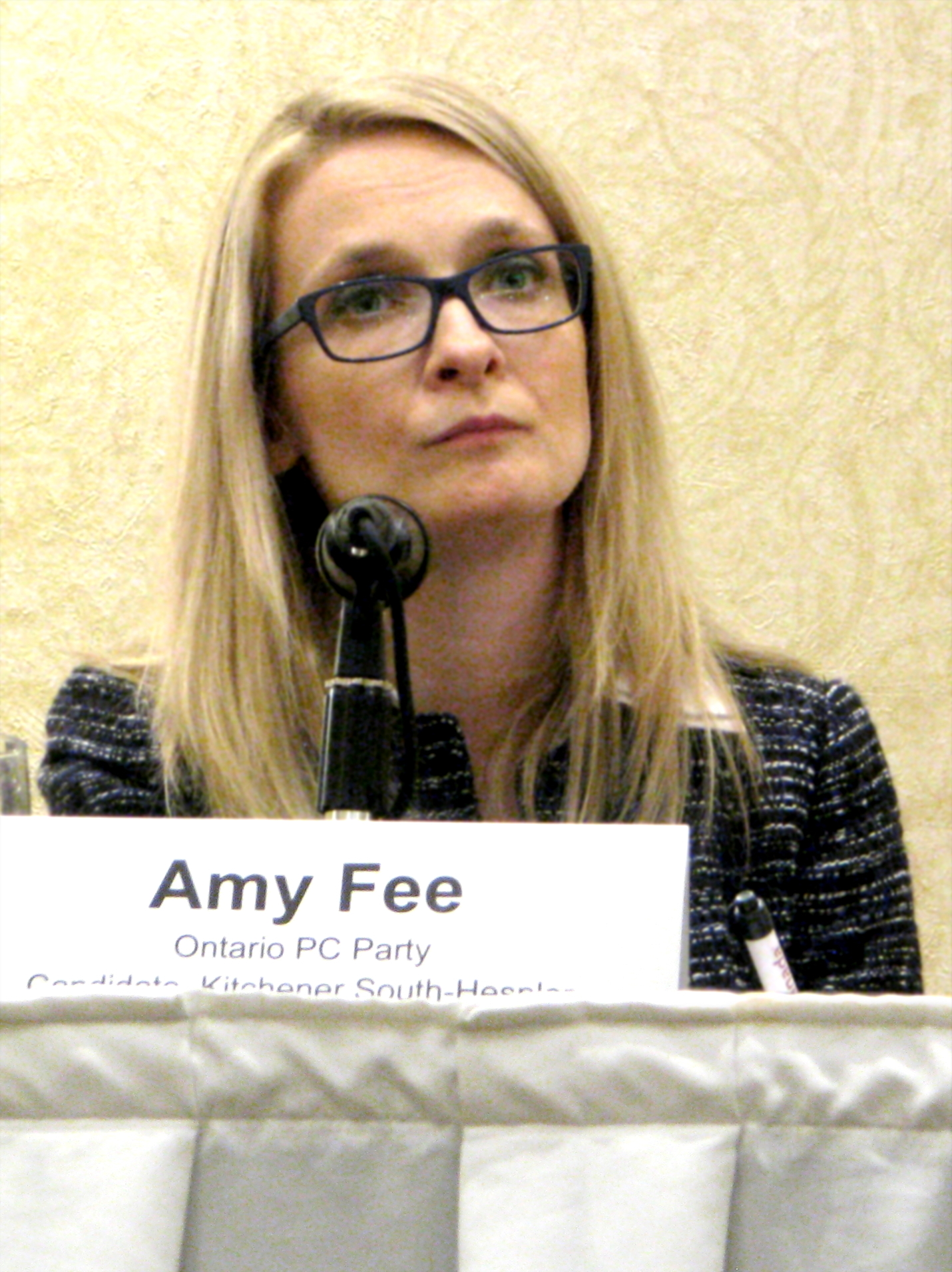
- Fee participating in the Developmental Services Sector All Candidates Meeting in Waterloo Region during the 2018 Ontario Provincial Election

Parliamentary Assistant to the Minister of Children, Community and Social Services (Children and Autism)
- In office June 29, 2018 – June 2, 2022
- Minister: Lisa MacLeod; Todd Smith; Merrilee Fullerton

Member of the Ontario Provincial Parliament for Kitchener South—Hespeler
- In office June 7, 2018 – May 3, 2022
- Preceded by: Riding established
- Succeeded by: Jess Dixon

Personal details
- Born: 1981 or 1982 (age 43–44)
- Party: Progressive Conservative
- Occupation: News anchor and sports reporter

Amy Fee (born 1981 or 1982) is a Canadian politician from Ontario. She was elected to the Legislative Assembly of Ontario in the 2018 provincial election and represented the riding of Kitchener South—Hespeler as a member of the Progressive Conservative Party of Ontario from 2018 to 2022.

Fee was previously an elected trustee for Kitchener-Wilmot with the Waterloo Catholic District School Board.

She is a mother of four children, two of whom have autism. She worked with the Ontario Autism Coalition to expand access to therapies and reduce waiting lists for families.

== Election results ==
2018 Ontario general election: Kitchener South—Hespeler
Party	Candidate	Votes	%
Progressive Conservative	Amy Fee	16,511	38.86
New Democratic	Fitz Vanderpool	15,741	37.05
Liberal	Surekha Shenoy	6,335	14.91
Green	David Weber	3,198	7.53
Libertarian	Nathan Andre Lajeunesse	423	1.00
Independent	Narine Sookram	275	0.65
Total valid votes			100.0
Source: Elections Ontario
