= Rick Byers =

Canadian politician

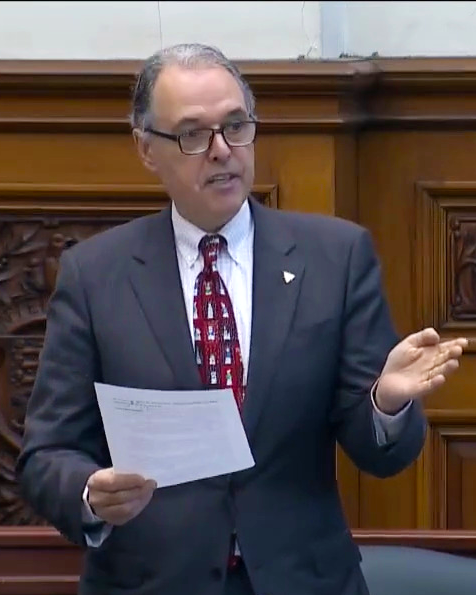
- Byers in 2022

Member of the Ontario Provincial Parliament for Bruce—Grey—Owen Sound
- In office June 2, 2022 – January 28, 2025
- Preceded by: Bill Walker
- Succeeded by: Paul Vickers

Personal details
- Party: Progressive Conservative
- Spouse: Margot

Rick Byers (born c. 1959) is a Canadian politician, who was elected to the Legislative Assembly of Ontario in the 2022 provincial election. He represented the riding of Bruce—Grey—Owen Sound as a member of the Progressive Conservative Party of Ontario.

On September 10, 2024, he announced he would not seek re-election in the 44th Ontario general election.

Byers was an unsuccessful candidate for the Progressive Conservative Party of Canada in the 2000 and Conservative Party of Canada in the 2004 Canadian federal election in Oakville.

== Electoral history ==
2022 Ontario general election: Bruce—Grey—Owen Sound
Party	Candidate	Votes	%	±%
Progressive Conservative	Rick Byers	20,304	48.56	−6.14
Liberal	Selwyn J. Hicks	8,499	20.33	+8.03
New Democratic	Karen Gventer	5,817	13.91	−10.18
Green	Danielle Valiquette	3,702	8.85	+2.90
Ontario Party	Suzanne Coles	1,680	4.02	
New Blue	Vince Grimaldi	1,130	2.70	
Populist	Joseph Westover	248	0.59	
None of the Above	Joel Loughead	230	0.55	
Independent	Reima Kaikkonen	201	0.48	
Total valid votes		41,811	100.0	
Total rejected, unmarked, and declined ballots		369		
Turnout		42,180	47.02	
Eligible voters		90,457		
Progressive Conservative hold		Swing		−7.09
Source(s): "Summary of Valid Votes Cast for Each Candidate" (PDF). Elections Ontario. 2022. Archived from the original on 2023-05-18.; "Statistical Summary by Electoral District" (PDF). Elections Ontario. 2022. Archived from the original on 2023-05-21.
