= Progress Party Ontario =

- Leader: Sara Forsyth
- President: Ghassan Kefeiri

Website
- https://progressontario.party/home

The Progress Party Ontario is a minor political party in the Canadian province of Ontario.

== Election results ==
Legislative Assembly
| Election | Votes | % | Position |
|---|---|---|---|
| 2025 | ▲602 | 0.01 | None |
