= Sheref Sabawy =

Canadian politician

Sheref Sabawy MPP
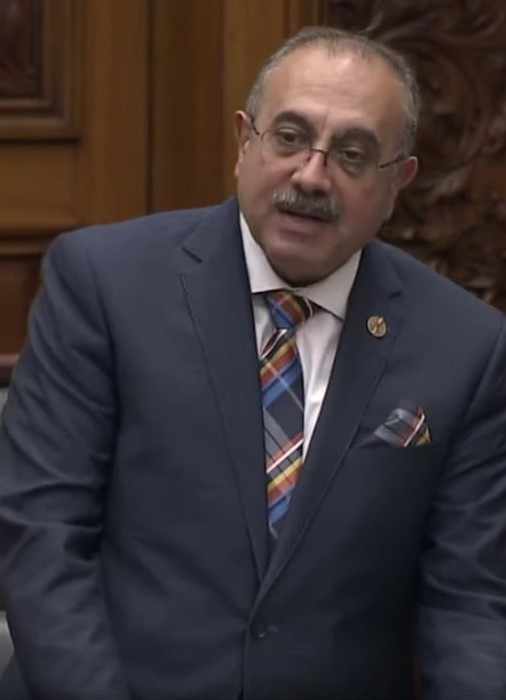

Parliamentary Assistant to the Minister of Labour, Immigration, Training and Skills Development
- Incumbent
- Assumed office April 7, 2025
- Minister: Trevor Jones

Member of the Ontario Provincial Parliament for Mississauga—Erin Mills
- Incumbent
- Assumed office June 7, 2018
- Preceded by: first member

Personal details
- Born: July 24, 1965 (age 61) Alexandria, Egypt
- Party: Progressive Conservative Party of Ontario
- Occupation: IT Professional

Sheref Sabawy MPP (Arabic: شريف السبعاوي) is a Canadian politician, who was elected to the Legislative Assembly of Ontario in the 2018 provincial election. He represents the riding of Mississauga—Erin Mills as a member of the Progressive Conservative Party of Ontario.

He serves as the Parliamentary Assistant to the Minister of Labour, Immigration, Training and Skills Development.

== Personal life ==
Sabawy was born in Alexandria, Egypt in 1965. He acquired a bachelor's degree in engineering from Alexandria University and worked as an engineer "for many years" in Egypt before immigrating to Canada in 1995. In Canada he faced issues with recognition of his degree due to "Canadian experience" requirements. He is married to Mary Sabawy, a doctor, and they have two sons. Sabawy is a Coptic Christian. Before being elected to Parliament, he worked as an IT Professor at George Brown College.

== Politics ==
In 2015, Sabawy ran for the Liberal Party of Canada nomination for the federal district of Mississauga—Erin Mills. Sabawy criticized the federal Conservative Party's views towards immigrants, saying “The Conservatives, as well, accept immigrants, but they want us to work at coffee shops and gas stations, not to become doctors or engineers.” He promised to oppose the Strengthening Canadian Citizenship Act. However he would lose the nomination to future MP Iqra Khalid, winning only 565 votes to Khalid's 943. Sabawy blamed his loss on a lack of political involvement and support for the Conservatives within the Coptic Canadian community, suggesting he could've been won if he sought out the Conservative nomination.

In 2017, Sabawy sought the Progressive Conservative nomination for the same riding but in the Legislative Assembly. While seeking the nomination, his past association with the federal Liberal Party became controversial. His opponent in the nomination race, former MP Bob Dechert called Sabawy “the very definition of an opportunist" and accused him and his supporters of being ideologically Liberal. Dechert would drop out of the race due to concerns about the fairness of the nomination process, leaving Sabawy to become the nominee. Afterwards, Sabawy refused to backtrack his past criticisms of the federal Conservatives and support for the federal Liberals. He argued that Patrick Brown represented a new and accepting version of the Progressive Conservatives, comparing him to Justin Trudeau.

In the 2018 Ontario general election, Sabawy was elected to the Legislative Assembly, defeating New Democratic candidate Farina Hassan and Liberal candidate Imran Mian. He was reelected in 2022, defeating the same two candidates. He won a third term in 2025, defeating Liberal candidate Qasir Dar by only 20 votes and 0.05% after a judicial recount.

== Electoral record ==
2025 Ontario general election: Mississauga—Erin Mills
Party	Candidate	Votes	%	±%
Progressive Conservative	Sheref Sabawy	16,694	44.26	+2.12
Liberal	Qasir Dar	16,671	44.20	+6.72
New Democratic	Mubashir Rizvi	2,090	5.54	–6.60
Green	Adriane Franklin	1,080	2.86	–1.42
New Blue	Michael Bayer	751	1.99	–0.64
Independent	Michael Matulewicz	309	0.82	–
Independent	Sajid Hussain	122	0.32	–
Total valid votes		37,717	97.93	
Total rejected, unmarked and declined ballots		796	2.07	+1.37
Turnout		38,513	41.03	–0.67
Eligible voters		93,863		
Progressive Conservative hold		Swing		+4.42
Source: Elections Ontario

2022 Ontario general election: Mississauga—Erin Mills
Party	Candidate	Votes	%	±%
Progressive Conservative	Sheref Sabawy	15,693	42.15	+0.54
Liberal	Imran Mian	13,954	37.48	+12.11
New Democratic	Farina Hassan	4,521	12.14	–15.46
Green	Michelle Angkasa	1,594	4.28	+1.53
New Blue	Charles Wroblewski	978	2.63	–
Ontario Party	Laura E. Scarangella	495	1.33	–
Total valid votes		37,235	99.30	
Total rejected, unmarked and declined ballots		262	0.70	–0.16
Turnout		37,497	41.70	–13.43
Eligible voters		89,926		
Progressive Conservative hold		Swing		–5.79
Source: Elections Ontario

2018 Ontario general election
Party	Candidate	Votes	%
Progressive Conservative	Sheref Sabawy	19,631	41.61
New Democratic	Farina Hassan	13,021	27.60
Liberal	Imran Mian	11,965	25.36
Green	Libby Yuill	1,296	2.75
None of the Above	Grzegorz Nowacki	670	1.42
Libertarian	Pieter Liem	483	1.02
Freedom	Ben Skura	112	0.24
Total valid votes		47,178	100.0
Turnout			56.05
Eligible voters		84,168	
Progressive Conservative pickup new district.			
Source: Elections Ontario
