= Jess Dixon =

Canadian politician (born 1987)

Jess Dixon MPP
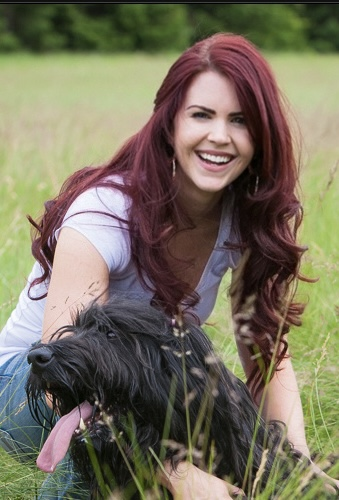
- Jess Dixon, Member of Provincial Parliament for Kitchener South—Hespeler

Member of the Ontario Provincial Parliament for Kitchener South—Hespeler
- Incumbent
- Assumed office June 2, 2022
- Preceded by: Amy Fee

Personal details
- Party: Progressive Conservative

Jess Dixon MPP is a Canadian politician, lawyer, and former Crown attorney who was elected to the Legislative Assembly of Ontario in the 2022 provincial election and re-elected in February 2025. She represents the riding of Kitchener South—Hespeler as a member of the Progressive Conservative Party of Ontario.

Dixon previously worked as an assistant Crown attorney in Ontario for ten years before entering politics. She has served in various legislative roles, including as the Parliamentary Assistant to the Minister of Energy and later to the Associate Minister of Women's Social and Economic Opportunity.

== Before Politics ==
Dixon was born in Victoria, British Columbia, and moved to Cambridge, Ontario, at age seven after her father accepted a job as an engineer with Babcock & Wilcox (now BWXT). Her mother, Ruth, is an operating room nurse.

She earned an undergraduate degree in philosophy from the University of Guelph, with an informal minor in Middle Eastern history and philosophy. Dixon then completed her law degree at the University of Ottawa, graduating in 2013.

During law school, she interned with the Ottawa Crown Attorney’s office and, after being called to the bar in 2014, returned to Cambridge to work as a provincial Crown attorney in the Kitchener courthouse.

Throughout her legal career, Dixon worked with individuals facing challenges such as mental health issues and addiction. She cited these experiences and a desire to support systemic improvements in education, healthcare, and justice as her reason for entering politics.

== Electoral record ==
2025 Ontario general election: Kitchener South—Hespeler
Party	Candidate	Votes	%	±%	Expenditures
Progressive Conservative	Jess Dixon	17,363	45.42	+5.51	$53,834
Liberal	Ismail Mohamed	9,830	25.72	+9.40	$23,785
New Democratic	Jeff Donkersgoed	6,841	17.90	–8.53	$17,992
Green	Jessica Riley	3,345	8.75	–2.83	$5,853
New Blue	John Soule	846	2.21	–1.95	$0
Total valid votes/expense limit		38,225	99.34	+0.11	$140,907
Total rejected, unmarked, and declined ballots		253	0.66	-0.11	
Turnout		38,478	44.22	+2.06	
Eligible voters		87,011			
Progressive Conservative hold		Swing		–2.13	
Source: Elections Ontario

2022 Ontario general election: Kitchener South—Hespeler
Party	Candidate	Votes	%	±%	Expenditures
Progressive Conservative	Jess Dixon	13,768	39.91	+1.05	$72,110
New Democratic	Joanne Weston	9,118	26.43	−10.62	$57,359
Liberal	Ismail Mohamed	5,629	16.32	+1.41	$40,062
Green	David Weber	3,993	11.58	+4.05	$18,207
New Blue	John Teat	1,436	4.16		$3,952
Ontario Party	David Gillies	552	1.60		$182
Total valid votes/expense limit		34,496	99.23	+0.76	$115,430
Total rejected, unmarked, and declined ballots		266	0.77	-0.76	
Turnout		34,762	42.16	-13.66	
Eligible voters		81,506			
Progressive Conservative hold		Swing		+5.83	
Source(s): "Summary of Valid Votes Cast for Each Candidate" (PDF). Elections Ontario. 2022. Archived from the original on 2023-05-18.; "Statistical Summary by Electoral District" (PDF). Elections Ontario. 2022. Archived from the original on 2023-05-21.
