= Kitchener South—Hespeler (provincial electoral district) =

Provincial electoral district in Ontario, Canada

Coordinates: 43.423°N 80.400°W

Ontario electoral district
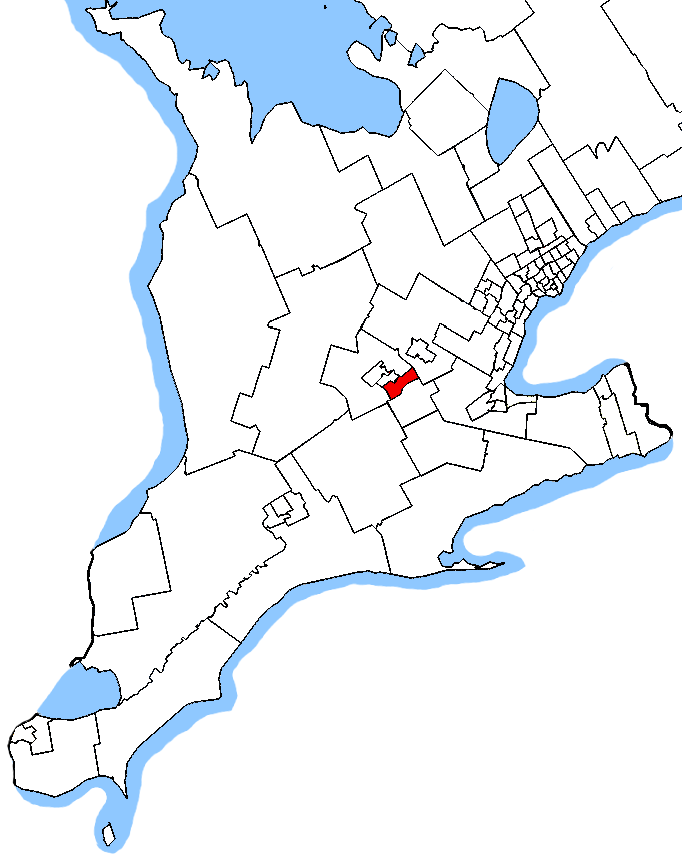
- Kitchener South-Hespeler in relation to Southern Ontario ridings

Provincial electoral district
- Legislature: Legislative Assembly of Ontario
MPP
Jess Dixon
Progressive Conservative
- District created: 2015
- First contested: 2018
- Last contested: 2025

Demographics
- Population (2016): 105,305
- Electors (2018): 77,296
- Area (km²): 107
- Pop. density (per km²): 984.2
- Census division: Waterloo
- Census subdivision(s): Kitchener, Cambridge

Kitchener South—Hespeler (French: Kitchener-Sud—Hespeler) is a provincial electoral district in Ontario, Canada. It was created in 2015 and has been represented in the Legislative Assembly of Ontario since the 42nd Ontario general election.

== Geography ==
Kitchener South—Hespeler was created from parts of the Kitchener—Conestoga, Kitchener Centre, and Cambridge electoral districts following the passage of the Representation Act, 2015 using the boundaries set out by the 2013 Federal Representation Order.

The new Kitchener South—Hespeler electoral district includes:

- The portion of the City of Cambridge lying northerly of Ontario Highway 401
- The portion of the City of Kitchener lying:
  - Southerly of the Conestoga Parkway
  - Easterly of Fischer-Hallman Road
  - Westerly of Ontario Highway 8 between the Conestoga Parkway and Fairway Road
  - Westerly of the border between the cities of Cambridge and Kitchener between Fairway Road and Ontario Highway 401

== Prominent Places ==
Kitchener South—Hespeler is home to several prominent places for the region including:

- Conestoga College's Doon and Cambridge Campuses
- McLennan Park
- Huron Natural Area
- Hespeler Village
- Chicopee Ski Hill
- Toyota Manufacturing Plant — major employer for the region
- Loblaws Distribution Centre — major employer for the region
- Fairview Park Mall
- Sportsworld Shopping Centre
- Cambridge Butterfly Conservatory
- Homer Watson House & Gallery
- Grand Valley Instuition for Women
- Ken Sieling Waterloo Region Museum and Doon Heritage Village

== Members of Provincial Parliament ==
Kitchener South-Hespeler
Assembly	Years	Member	Party
Kitchener South—Hespeler; Riding created from Kitchener—Conestoga , Kitchener Centre and Cambridge
42nd	2018–2022	Amy Fee	Progressive Conservative
43rd	2022–present	Jess Dixon	Progressive Conservative

== Electoral history ==
Winning party in each polling division of Kitchener South—Hespeler at the 2025 Ontario general election

2025 Ontario general election
Party	Candidate	Votes	%	±%	Expenditures
Progressive Conservative	Jess Dixon	17,363	45.42	+5.51	$53,834
Liberal	Ismail Mohamed	9,830	25.72	+9.40	$23,785
New Democratic	Jeff Donkersgoed	6,841	17.90	–8.54	$17,992
Green	Jessica Riley	3,345	8.75	–2.82	$5,853
New Blue	John Soule	846	2.21	–1.95	$0
Total valid votes/expense limit		38,225	99.34	–	$140,907
Total rejected, unmarked and declined ballots		253	0.66	–0.11	
Turnout		38,478	43.96	+1.80	
Eligible voters		87,520			
Progressive Conservative hold		Swing		▼1.94	
Source: Elections Ontario

Winning party in each polling division of Kitchener South—Hespeler at the 2022 Ontario general election

2022 Ontario general election
Party	Candidate	Votes	%	±%	Expenditures
Progressive Conservative	Jess Dixon	13,768	39.91	+1.05	$72,110
New Democratic	Joanne Weston	9,118	26.43	–10.62	$57,359
Liberal	Ismail Mohamed	5,629	16.32	+1.41	$40,062
Green	David Weber	3,993	11.58	+4.05	$18,207
New Blue	John Teat	1,436	4.16	–	$3,952
Ontario Party	David Gillies	552	1.60	–	$182
Total valid votes/expense limit		34,496	99.23	–	$115,430
Total rejected, unmarked and declined ballots		266	0.77	–0.77	
Turnout		34,762	42.16	–13.66	
Eligible voters		82,450			
Progressive Conservative hold		Swing		▲5.83	
Source: Elections Ontario

2018 Ontario general election
Party	Candidate	Votes	%
Progressive Conservative	Amy Fee	16,511	38.86
New Democratic	Fitz Vanderpool	15,741	37.05
Liberal	Surekha Shenoy	6,335	14.91
Green	David Weber	3,198	7.53
Libertarian	Nathan Andre Lajeunesse	423	1.00
Independent	Narine Sookram	275	0.65
Total valid votes		42,483	98.47
Total rejected, unmarked and declined ballots		661	1.53
Turnout		43,144	55.82
Eligible voters		77,296	
Progressive Conservative pickup new district.			
Source: Elections Ontario

2014 general election redistributed results
Party	Vote	%
Liberal	12,403	36.53
Progressive Conservative	10,894	32.08
New Democratic	7,895	23.25
Green	2,124	6.26
Libertarian	638	1.88

== See also ==
- List of Ontario provincial electoral districts
- Canadian provincial electoral districts
