= Mississauga—Erin Mills (provincial electoral district) =

Provincial electoral district in Ontario, Canada

Coordinates: 43.545°N 79.698°W

Ontario electoral district
- Location in Mississauga

Provincial electoral district
- Legislature: Legislative Assembly of Ontario
MPP
Sheref Sabawy
Progressive Conservative
- District created: 2015
- First contested: 2018
- Last contested: 2025

Demographics
- Population (2016): 122,565
- Electors (2018): 86,321
- Area (km²): 34
- Pop. density (per km²): 3,604.9
- Census division: Peel
- Census subdivision: Mississauga

Mississauga—Erin Mills is a provincial electoral district in Ontario, Canada. It elects one member to the Legislative Assembly of Ontario. This riding was created in 2015.

== Members of Provincial Parliament ==
Mississauga—Erin Mills
Assembly	Years	Member	Party
Riding created from Mississauga—Erindale and Halton
42nd	2018–2022	Sheref Sabawy	Progressive Conservative
43rd	2022–2025	Sheref Sabawy	Progressive Conservative
44th	2025–present	Sheref Sabawy	Progressive Conservative

== Election results ==
Winning party in each polling division of Mississauga—Erin Mills at the 2025 Ontario general election

2025 Ontario general election
Party	Candidate	Votes	%	±%
Progressive Conservative	Sheref Sabawy	16,694	44.26	+2.12
Liberal	Qasir Dar	16,671	44.20	+6.72
New Democratic	Mubashir Rizvi	2,090	5.54	–6.60
Green	Adriane Franklin	1,080	2.86	–1.42
New Blue	Michael Bayer	751	1.99	–0.64
Independent	Michael Matulewicz	309	0.82	–
Independent	Sajid Hussain	122	0.32	–
Total valid votes		37,717	97.93	
Total rejected, unmarked and declined ballots		796	2.07	+1.37
Turnout		38,513	41.03	–0.67
Eligible voters		93,863		
Progressive Conservative hold		Swing		▼2.30
Source: Elections Ontario

Winning party in each polling division of Mississauga—Erin Mills at the 2022 Ontario general election

2022 Ontario general election
Party	Candidate	Votes	%	±%
Progressive Conservative	Sheref Sabawy	15,693	42.15	+0.54
Liberal	Imran Mian	13,954	37.48	+12.11
New Democratic	Farina Hassan	4,521	12.14	–15.46
Green	Michelle Angkasa	1,594	4.28	+1.53
New Blue	Charles Wroblewski	978	2.63	–
Ontario Party	Laura E. Scarangella	495	1.33	–
Total valid votes		37,235	99.30	
Total rejected, unmarked and declined ballots		262	0.70	–0.16
Turnout		37,497	41.70	–13.43
Eligible voters		89,926		
Progressive Conservative hold		Swing		–5.79
Source: Elections Ontario

2018 Ontario general election
Party	Candidate	Votes	%
Progressive Conservative	Sheref Sabawy	19,631	41.61
New Democratic	Farina Hassan	13,021	27.60
Liberal	Imran Mian	11,965	25.36
Green	Libby Yuill	1,296	2.75
None of the Above	Grzegorz Nowacki	670	1.42
Libertarian	Pieter Liem	483	1.02
Freedom	Ben Skura	112	0.24
Total valid votes		47,178	99.14
Total rejected, unmarked and declined ballots		409	0.86
Turnout		47,587	55.13
Eligible voters		86,321	
Progressive Conservative pickup new district.			
Source: Elections Ontario

2014 general election redistributed results
Party	Vote	%
Liberal	17,429	49.26
Progressive Conservative	10,385	29.35
New Democratic	5,361	15.15
Others	1,385	3.91
Green	826	2.33

== See also ==
- List of Ontario provincial electoral districts
- Canadian provincial electoral districts
