= Ontario Alliance =

Provincial political party in Canada

- Leader: Joshua E. Eriksen (interim)
- President: Joshua E. Eriksen
- Founded: 2017
- Split from: Progressive Conservative Party of Ontario
- Headquarters: 406-111 Church St. St. Catharines ON L2R 3C9
- Ideology: Social conservatism Right-wing populism
- Political position: Right-wing
- Colours: Navy Blue
- Seats in Legislature: 0 / 124

Website
- http://www.ontario-alliance.ca

The Ontario Alliance is a minor social conservative and right-wing populist political party in the Canadian province of Ontario. Founded in November 2017 by Jay Tysick, the party was led during the 2018 Ontario provincial election by William Cook.

== History ==
The Ontario Alliance was founded in 2017 by members of the Ontario Progressive Conservative Party disaffected with then-leader Patrick Brown. Joined by members of the single-issue Stop the New Sex-Ed Agenda party, the disbanded New Reform Party of Ontario, and social conservative activists with the federal Conservative Party, the new Alliance took issue with Brown's positions on social issues and control of candidate nominations for the 2018 Ontario general election.

Jay Tysick, the party's first leader, is a former member of the Progressive Conservatives and chief of staff for Ottawa City Councillor Rick Chiarelli. Tysick indicated to media that he was driven to organize the party after being turned down for the PC nomination in the Ottawa-area riding of Carleton. Tysick said he was disqualified from standing as a candidate due to his right-wing views.

Tysick was challenged by PC candidate for Carleton, Goldie Ghamari, for making 'libellous' comments about her prior to the nomination meeting from which he was disqualified.

In the lead-up to the 2018 Ontario Provincial Elections, members of party's leadership left the Alliance, claiming that the party's CFO and president were not complying with the constitution or the decisions made by the board of directors. This break-away faction established the competing right-wing populist Ontario Party in protest.

The party failed to win any seats in the 2022 Ontario general election.

== Positions ==
The Ontario Alliance outlines its principles in a set of nine points in its charter. These points include:

- protection of the life, liberty and property;
- belief in limited government;
- belief in the role that autonomous institutions such as church, family and other voluntary associations play in maintaining limited government by balancing and diffusing the power of the state;
- support for traditional marriage and family;
- opposing government monopolies;
- supporting freedom of conscience, worship, speech, association and the principle of equality before the law;
- opposing budget deficits and surplus budgets;
- promoting personal independence, hard work and success;
- responsible exploration and development of Ontario's natural resources; and
- decentralized government.

For the 2018 election, the Alliance campaigned on a seven-point platform entitled "Bringing Ontario Back: A Seven Point Plan towards a Better Ontario together!" This platform called for a balanced budget, reduced taxes, downloading of responsibilities to municipalities, increased privatization of health care provision, and implementing legislation that allows for the recall of MPPs and citizen-initiated referendums. It opposed a carbon tax and updates to the provincial sexual education curriculum.

== Election results ==
Election year	# of overall votes	% of overall total	# of candidates run	# of seats won	+/–	Government
2018	802	0.01%	3 / 124	0 / 124	New Party	Extra-parliamentary
2022	108		2 / 124	0 / 124	0	Extra-parliamentary
2025	648	0.01%	5 / 124	0 / 124	0	Extra-parliamentary
