= Stop the New Sex-Ed Agenda =

Provincial political party in Canada

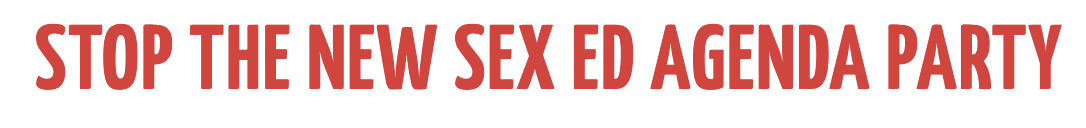
- Leader: John Kanary
- President: John Kanary
- Founder: Queenie Yu
- Founded: October 2016
- Registered: November 2, 2016
- Headquarters: PO Box 11517 RPO The East Mall Etobicoke ON M9B 6L1
- Ideology: Social conservatism
- Colors: Red
- Seats in Legislature: 0 / 124

Website
- stopwynnesexed.ca

Stop the New Sex-Ed Agenda is a minor social conservative provincial political party in Ontario, Canada. It was founded by Queenie Yu, who also served as its original leader. It is a single issue party with a platform based on being in opposition to the updated sexual education curriculum for Ontario public schools implemented in 2015. Yu has stated on multiple occasions that the goal of the party is not to win seats but rather to encourage others to oppose the curriculum.

== History ==
Prior to the foundation of the party, Queenie Yu ran as an independent candidate in the September 1, 2016 byelection in Scarborough—Rouge River, coming in fourth with 582 votes.

Yu and other protesters opposed to the Ontario government's February 2015 update of the Ontario sex education curriculum founded the party in October 2016. The party was officially registered with Elections Ontario on November 2, 2016.

It ran one candidate each in the 2016 by-elections in Ottawa—Vanier and Niagara West—Glanbrook. In the 2018 Ontario general election, the party ran a total of three candidates, none of which won their seats.

The party failed to win any seats in the 2022 Ontario general election.

The party achieved its best ever result in the 2023 Scarborough—Guildwood provincial by-election, receiving 3.29% of the vote.

On July 2, 2024, it was announced that Queenie Yu was stepping down as leader and John Kanary became the new leader of the party.

== Leaders ==
Leader	Term of office	
Queenie Yu	November 2, 2016	July 2, 2024
John Kanary	July 2, 2024	present

== Election results ==
Ontario provincial by-elections, November 17, 2016
Riding	Candidate's Name	Notes	Votes	%	Rank
Ottawa—Vanier	Elizabeth de Viel Castel		399	1.32	5/11
Niagara West—Glanbrook	Queenie Yu		76	0.23	8/9

2018 Ontario general election
Riding	Candidate's Name	Notes	Votes	%	Rank
Mississauga Centre	Alex Pacis		890	2.04	5/7
Toronto Centre	Theresa Snell		102	0.23	8/10
Spadina—Fort York	Queenie Yu		86	0.17	7/7

2022 Ontario general election
Riding	Candidate's Name	Notes	Votes	%	Rank
University—Rosedale	John Kanary		140	0.37	6/6
Toronto Centre	Jennifer Snell		105	0.30	8/8
Spadina—Fort York	Jan Osko		95	0.28	6/6

2023 Scarborough—Guildwood provincial by-election
Riding	Candidate's Name	Notes	Votes	%	Rank
Scarborough—Guildwood	Tony Walton		508	3.29	4/12

2025 Ontario general election
Riding	Candidate's Name	Notes	Votes	%	Rank
Bruce—Grey—Owen Sound	Ann Gillies		1,006	2.20	5/8
St. Catharines	Natalia Benoit		347	0.74	6/8
