= Populist Party Ontario =

Provincial political party in Canada

Populist Party Ontario Parti Populiste Ontario
- Active provincial party
- Abbreviation: PPO
- Leader: Jim Torma
- President: Shelley Batcules
- Founded: December 17, 2021
- Registered: May 9, 2022
- Headquarters: 4310 Bartlett Road Beamsville ON L3J 0Y9
- Ideology: Right-wing populism
- Political position: Right-wing
- National affiliation: People's Party of Canada
- Colours: Purple
- Seats in Legislature: 0 / 124

Website
- www.populistpartyontario.com

The Populist Party Ontario (PPO; French: Parti Populiste Ontario) is a minor political party in Ontario, Canada. The party is led by Jim Torma, former People's Party of Canada regional coordinator for Southwestern Ontario. The party's past candidates of record have included former PPC candidates such as Chelsea Hillier, who in 2022 contested the Lanark—Frontenac—Kingston seat previously held by her father Randy Hillier.

== Election results ==
Election results
Election year	No. of overall votes	% of overall total	No. of candidates run	No. of seats won	+/−	Government
2022	2,638	0.05%	13 / 124	0 / 124	New Party	Extra-parliamentary
2025	706	0.01%	4 / 124	0 / 124	Steady	Extra-parliamentary

=== By-elections ===
By-election	Date	Candidate	Votes	%	Place
Kitchener Centre	November 30, 2023	Mario Greco	22	0.09%	13/18

== See also ==
- Randy Hillier § 2022 general election
