= Ontario New Democratic Party candidates in the 2018 Ontario provincial election =

This is a list of candidates for the Ontario New Democratic Party in the 2018 Ontario general election. The ONDP nominated candidates in all of Ontario's 124 ridings, 40 of whom were elected. Following the election, the ONDP was the second largest party in the Legislative Assembly of Ontario, and formed the Official Opposition.

== Central Ontario ==
Riding	Candidate's Name	Notes	Residence	Occupation	Votes	%	Rank
Barrie—Innisfil	Pekka Reinio		Barrie	Teacher	12,661	28.60	2nd
Barrie—Springwater—Oro-Medonte	Dan Janssen			Union leader (IAMAW)	12,891	28.21	2nd
Dufferin—Caledon	Andrea Mullarkey			Work safety professional	11,381	20.34	2nd
Haliburton—Kawartha Lakes—Brock	Zac Miller		Kawartha Lakes	University student	15,142	26.50	2nd
Northumberland—Peterborough South	Jana Papuckoski		Port Hope	Union leader (United Steelworkers)/Security guard	14,804	24.50	2nd
Peterborough—Kawartha	Sean Conway			Musician/Artist	20,518	33.75	2nd
Simcoe North	Elizabeth Van Houtte	Candidate for Orillia City Council in the 2014 Orillia municipal election	Orillia	Social worker	15,078	28.03	2nd
Simcoe–Grey	David Matthews	ONDP candidate for Simcoe–Grey in the 2014 and 2011 provincial elections			13,444	22.05	2nd

== Eastern Ontario/Ottawa ==
Riding	Candidate's Name	Notes	Residence	Occupation	Votes	%	Rank
Bay of Quinte	Joanne Bélanger	Hastings & Prince Edward Roman Catholic School Board Trustee for Sidney Township and Frankford (1994–1997)	Quinte West	Christian chaplain	16,063	31.84	2nd
Carleton	Courtney Potter				11,308	22.50	2nd
Glengarry—Prescott—Russell	Bonnie Jean-Louis	ONDP candidate for Glengarry—Prescott—Russell in the 2011 provincial election Green Party candidate for Glengarry—Prescott—Russell in the 2006 federal election	Hawkesbury		10,610	21.79	3rd
Hastings—Lennox and Addington	Nate Smelle		Bancroft	Journalist/Small business owner	14,441	32.44	2nd
Kanata—Carleton	John Hansen				15,592	29.17	2nd
Kingston and the Islands	Ian Arthur		Kingston	Chef	21,788	39.16	1st
Lanark—Frontenac—Kingston	Ramsey Hart		Perth	Food bank director	15,339	30.47	2nd
Leeds—Grenville—Thousand Islands and Rideau Lakes	Michelle Taylor			University student	9,688	19.78	2nd
Nepean	Zaff Ansari				15,110	28.53	2nd
Orléans	Barbara Zarboni				14,033	21.94	3rd
Ottawa Centre	Joel Harden		Old Ottawa South	Researcher/Educator	29,675	46.08	1st
Ottawa South	Eleanor Fast		Ottawa	Policy analyst	14,250	27.19	3rd
Ottawa West—Nepean	Chandra Pasma		Qualicum-Graham Park, Ottawa	Researcher/Policy analyst	16,415	32.48	2nd
Ottawa—Vanier	Lyra Evans		Ottawa		14,232	29.68	2nd
Renfrew—Nipissing—Pembroke	Ethel Lavalley	Mayor of South Algonquin (1998–present); Mayor of Airy (1985–1998)	Airy	Union leader (OPSEU)	8,066	17.63	2nd
Stormont—Dundas—South Glengarry	Marc Benoit		Cornwall		9,416	21.63	2nd

== Greater Toronto Area ==
Riding	Candidate's Name	Notes	Residence	Occupation	Votes	%	Rank
Ajax	Monique Hughes				15,130	30.97	2nd
Aurora—Oak Ridges—Richmond Hill	Katrina Sale			Teacher	8,116	18.04	3rd
Beaches—East York	Rima Berns-McGown				24,064	48.21	1st
Brampton Centre	Sara Singh			Non-profit executive	12,892	38.37	1st
Brampton East	Gurratan Singh	Brother of Jagmeet Singh		Lawyer	18,062	46.92	1st
Brampton North	Kevin Yarde		Toronto	Journalist	14,877	37.55	1st
Brampton South	Paramjit Gill				12,919	33.85	2nd
Brampton West	Jagroop Singh				14,461	38.09	2nd
Burlington	Andrew Drummond				18,053	28.63	2nd
Davenport	Marit Stiles	President of the New Democratic Party (2016–2018); Toronto District School Board Trustee for Ward 9 (Davenport) (2014–2018)	Toronto	Researcher/Policy analyst	27,613	60.27	1st
Don Valley East	Khalid Ahmed	ONDP candidate for Don Valley West in the 2014 and 2011 provincial elections			9,937	27.44	3rd
Don Valley North	Akil Sadikali				8,476	20.87	3rd
Don Valley West	Amara Possian				8,620	18.83	3rd
Durham	Joel Usher				19,253	31.66	2nd
Eglinton—Lawrence	Robyn Vilde				8,985	18.14	3rd
Etobicoke Centre	Erica Kelly				10,311	18.15	3rd
Etobicoke—Lakeshore	Phil Trotter				19,401	32.89	2nd
Etobicoke North	Mahamud Amin				9,210	25.37	2nd
Humber River—Black Creek	Tom Rakocevic	ONDP candidate for York West in the 2014 and 2011 provincial elections		Executive assistant	11,573	37.41	1st
King—Vaughan	Andrea Beal				7,921	15.39	3rd
Markham—Stouffville	Kingsley Kwok			Respiratory therapist	10,997	20.42	3rd
Markham—Thornhill	Cindy Hackelberg	ONDP candidate for Thornhill in the 2014 and 2011 provincial elections			8,010	21.33	3rd
Markham—Unionville	Sylvie David				7,778	16.57	3rd
Milton	Brendan Smyth				9,740	22.24	3rd
Mississauga Centre	Laura Kaminker				12,046	27.56	2nd
Mississauga East—Cooksville	Tom Takacs				9,871	22.74	3rd
Mississauga—Erin Mills	Farina Hassan				13,021	27.60	2nd
Mississauga—Lakeshore	Boris Rosolak	ONDP candidate for Mississauga—Lakeshore in the 2014 provincial election			9,735	18.30	3rd
Mississauga—Malton	Nikki Clarke				12,351	32.84	2nd
Mississauga—Streetsville	Jacqueline Gujarati				12,393	25.84	2nd
Newmarket—Aurora	Melissa Williams				12,405	23.85	2nd
Oakville	Lesley Sprague	ONDP candidate for Oakville in the 2011 provincial election			9,424	16.57	3rd
Oakville North—Burlington	Saima Zaidi				13,496	24.38	2nd
Oshawa	Jennifer French	Member of Provincial Parliament for Oshawa (2014–present)	Oshawa	Teacher	24,301	44.88	1st
Parkdale—High Park	Bhutila Karpoche				32,407	59.41	1st
Pickering—Uxbridge	Nerissa Cariño				17,033	32.02	2nd
Richmond Hill	Marco Coletta				7,490	17.27	3rd
Scarborough—Agincourt	Tasleem Riaz				6,434	17.45	3rd
Scarborough Centre	Zeyd Bismilla				13,247	33.36	2nd
Scarborough—Guildwood	Tom Packwood			Financial advisor	9,917	27.62	3rd
Scarborough North	Dwayne Morgan				8,320	24.39	2nd
Scarborough—Rouge Park	Felicia Samuel				15,261	36.32	2nd
Scarborough Southwest	Doly Begum		Scarborough	Researcher/policy analyst	19,835	45.66	1st
Thornhill	Ezra Tanen				9,134	19.33	2nd
Toronto Centre	Suze Morrison				23,688	53.66	1st
Toronto—Danforth	Peter Tabuns	Member of Provincial Parliament for Toronto—Danforth (2006–present); Member of Toronto City Council (1990–1997)	Toronto	Former executive director of Greenpeace Canada	32,938	64.25	1st
Toronto—St. Paul’s	Jill Andrew				18,843	35.96	1st
University—Rosedale	Jessica Bell				24,537	49.66	1st
Vaughan—Woodbridge	Sandra Lozano				6,254	14.56	3rd
Whitby	Niki Lundquist				21,158	36.61	2nd
Willowdale	Saman Tabasinejad				10,481	25.79	3rd
York Centre	Andrea Vásquez Jiménez				8,617	23.44	2nd
York—Simcoe	Dave Szollosy				10,655	23.42	2nd
York South—Weston	Faisal Hassan			Broadcaster/Author	13,455	36.07	1st

== Hamilton/Niagara ==
Riding	Candidate's Name	Notes	Residence	Occupation	Votes	%	Rank
Flamborough—Glanbrook	Melissa McGlashan				17,630	34.17	2nd
Hamilton Centre	Andrea Horwath	Leader of the Ontario New Democratic Party (2009–2022); Member of Provincial Parliament for Hamilton Centre (2004–2022); Member of Hamilton City Council for Ward 2 (1997–2004)	Hamilton		23,866	65.25	1st
Hamilton East—Stoney Creek	Paul Miller				22,518	51.15	1st
Hamilton Mountain	Monique Taylor	Member of Provincial Parliament for Hamilton Mountain (2011–2025)	Hamilton		24,406	54.58	1st
Hamilton West—Ancaster—Dundas	Sandy Shaw		Hamilton	Former Director of the Hamilton Port Authority	23,921	43.19	1st
Niagara Centre	Jeff Burch	Member of St. Catharines City Council (2006–2014)	Thorold	Union leader/Instructor at Brock University	21,618	44.23	1st
Niagara Falls	Wayne Gates	Member of Provincial Parliament for Niagara Falls (2014–present); Member of Niagara Falls City Council (2010–2014)	Niagara Falls	Union leader	30,161	50.79	1st
Niagara West	Curtis Fric				13,769	29.81	2nd
St. Catharines	Jennie Stevens	Member of St. Catharines City Council (2003–2018)	St. Catharines	Non-profit executive	18,911	36.61	1st

== Northern Ontario ==
Riding	Candidate's Name	Notes	Residence	Occupation	Votes	%	Rank
Algoma—Manitoulin	Michael Mantha	Member of Provincial Parliament for Algoma—Manitoulin (2011–2025)	Elliot Lake	Executive assistant	17,105	58.56	1st
Kenora—Rainy River	Glen Archer		Kenora	Corrections officer	7,493	37.33	2nd
Kiiwetinoong	Sol Mamakwa		Sioux Lookout	Healthcare advisor	3,232	49.90	1st
Mushkegowuk—James Bay	Guy Bourgouin		Kapuskasing	Union leader	4,827	51.77	1st
Nickel Belt	France Gélinas	Member of Provincial Parliament for Nickel Belt (2007–present)	Naughton	Physiotherapist	23,157	63.50	1st
Nipissing	Henri Giroux	ONDP candidate for Nipissing in the 2014, 2011, and 2007 provincial elections		Chef	12,994	36.87	2nd
Parry Sound—Muskoka	Erin Horvath		Huntsville	Small business owner	10,385	22.03	2nd
Sault Ste. Marie	Michele McCleave-Kennedy		Sault Ste. Marie		13,084	40.74	2nd
Sudbury	Jamie West		Sudbury		17,386	48.07	1st
Thunder Bay—Atikokan	Judith Monteith-Farrell		Thunder Bay	Union official	11,793	36.26	1st
Thunder Bay—Superior North	Lise Vaugeois		Thunder Bay	Professor at Lakehead University/Musician	11,160	37.16	2nd
Timiskaming—Cochrane	John Vanthof	Member of Provincial Parliament for Timiskaming—Cochrane (2011–present)	Earlton	Farmer	16,806	61.20	1st
Timmins	Gilles Bisson	Member of Provincial Parliament for Timmins—James Bay (1999–2018); Member of Provincial Parliament for Cochrane South (1990–1999)	Timmins	Union leader	8,978	57.43	1st

== Southwestern Ontario ==
Riding	Candidate's Name	Notes	Residence	Occupation	Votes	%	Rank
Brantford—Brant	Alex Felsky	ONDP candidate for Brant in the 2014 provincial election			23,802	40.91	2nd
Bruce—Grey—Owen Sound	Karen Gventer	ONDP candidate for Bruce—Grey—Owen Sound in the 2014 provincial election NDP candidate for Bruce—Grey—Owen Sound in the 2011 federal election	Hepworth	Public health official	11,837	24.09	2nd
Cambridge	Marjorie Knight		Cambridge	Social worker	15,639	32.49	2nd
Chatham-Kent—Leamington	Jordan McGrail		Chatham	Robotics technician	16,558	35.71	2nd
Elgin—Middlesex—London	Amanda Stratton		London	Small business owner	16,923	32.07	2nd
Essex	Taras Natyshak	Member of Provincial Parliament for Essex (2011–2022)	Belle River	Union official	26,134	47.95	1st
Guelph	Agnieszka Mlynarz				13,929	21.57	3rd
Haldimand—Norfolk	Danielle Du Sablon	President of OPSEU Local 221	Brant County	Probation officer	13,609	26.90	2nd
Huron—Bruce	Jan Johnstone	ONDP candidate for Huron—Bruce in the 2014 provincial election			15,326	29.03	2nd
Kitchener Centre	Laura Mae Lindo				20,512	43.38	1st
Kitchener—Conestoga	Kelly Dick		Kitchener	Union official (UFCW)	16,319	37.97	2nd
Kitchener South—Hespeler	Fitz Vanderpool		Kitchener	Boxer	15,741	37.05	2nd
Lambton—Kent—Middlesex	Todd Case	Mayor of Warwick (2001–present)	Warwick		16,800	33.32	2nd
London—Fanshawe	Teresa Armstrong	Member of Provincial Parliament for London—Fanshawe (2011–present)	London	Insurance professional	25,272	55.68	1st
London North Centre	Terence Kernaghan		London	Teacher	25,757	47.60	1st
London West	Peggy Sattler	Member of Provincial Parliament for London West (2013–present)	London	Policy analyst	32,644	55.33	1st
Oxford	Tara King				15,917	30.43	2nd
Perth—Wellington	Michael O'Brien		Stratford	Aerospace eingineer	14,385	30.71	2nd
Sarnia—Lambton	Kathy Alexander				18,995	37.37	2nd
Waterloo	Catherine Fife	Member of Provincial Parliament for Waterloo (2012–present)	Waterloo	Researcher	27,315	50.54	1st
Wellington—Halton Hills	Diane Ballantyne		Fergus	Teacher	14,087	24.03	2nd
Windsor—Tecumseh	Percy Hatfield	Member of Provincial Parliament for Windsor—Tecumseh (2013–2022)	Windsor	Journalist	25,221	58.40	1st
Windsor West	Lisa Gretzky	Member of Provincial Parliament for Windsor West (2014–present); Greater Essex County District School Board Trustee (2008–2014)	Windsor	Event planner	20,276	52.12	1st
