= Ontario New Democratic Party candidates in the 2022 Ontario provincial election =

This is a list of candidates for the Ontario New Democratic Party in the 2022 Ontario general election.

== Central Ontario ==
Riding	Candidate's Name	Notes	Residence	Occupation	Votes	%	Rank
Barrie—Innisfil	Pekka Reinio	NDP candidate for Barrie—Innisfil in the 2019 federal election ONDP candidate for Barrie—Innisfil in the 2018 provincial election	Barrie	Teacher	6,942	19.14	2nd
Barrie—Springwater—Oro-Medonte	Beverley Patchell			Union leader	3,093	7.83	3rd
Dufferin—Caledon	Tess Prendergast		Orangeville	Teacher	4,967	10.77	4th
Haliburton—Kawartha Lakes—Brock	Barbara Doyle	NDP candidate for Haliburton—Kawartha Lakes—Brock in the 2019 federal election	Lindsay	Museum curator	7,692	15.72	2nd
Northumberland—Peterborough South	Kim McArthur-Jackson	NDP candidate for Northumberland—Peterborough South in the 2021 federal election	Campbellford		6,806	13.12	3rd
Peterborough—Kawartha	Jen Deck		Peterborough	Teacher	11,196	21.38	3rd
Simcoe North	Elizabeth Van Houtte	ONDP candidate for Simcoe North in the 2018 provincial election and 2015 provincial by-election Candidate for Orillia City Council in the 2014 Orillia municipal election	Orillia	Social worker	8,208	17.74	2nd
Simcoe–Grey	Keith Nunn			IT professional	5,849	11.06	3rd

== Eastern Ontario/Ottawa ==
Riding	Candidate's Name	Notes	Residence	Occupation	Votes	%	Rank
Bay of Quinte	Alison Kelly	Hastings and Prince Edward District School Board Trustee for Wards 1, 2, 5, 8 and 9 (2018–2022)	Cherry Valley	Project manager	9,073	20.92	2nd
Carleton	Kevin St. Denis		Richmond	Teacher	7,256	15.67	3rd
Glengarry—Prescott—Russell	Alicia Eglin		Nepean		3,789	8.54	3rd
Hastings—Lennox and Addington	Eric DePoe		Napanee	Paralegal/Small business owner	7,258	19.01	2nd
Kanata—Carleton	Melissa Coenraad	NDP candidate for Kanata—Carleton in the 2021 and 2019 federal elections	Kanata	Laboratory technician	11,045	24.24	2nd
Kingston and the Islands	Mary Rita Holland	Member of Kingston City Council for Kingscourt-Rideau District 7 (2014–2022)	Kingston	Professor at Queen's University	15,186	31.15	2nd
Lanark—Frontenac—Kingston	Drew Cumpson			Disability rights activist	9,146	20.70	2nd
Leeds—Grenville—Thousand Islands and Rideau Lakes	Chris Wilson		Kemptville	Finance professional	5,799	13.57	3rd
Nepean	Brian Double		Nepean	Civil servant	8,435	19.34	3rd
Orléans	Gabe Bourdon		Orleans	Union leader	7,150	13.79	3rd
Ottawa Centre	Joel Harden	Member of Provincial Parliament for Ottawa Centre (2018–2025)	Old Ottawa South	Researcher/Educator	30,311	54.34	1st
Ottawa South	Morgan Gay	NDP candidate for Ottawa South in the 2019 federal election	Alta Vista, Ottawa	Union negotiator	9,619	23.75	2nd
Ottawa West—Nepean	Chandra Pasma		Qualicum-Graham Park, Ottawa	Researcher/Policy analyst	15,696	37.54	1st
Ottawa—Vanier	Lyra Evans	Ottawa Carleton District School Board Trustee for Zone 9 (2018–2022); ONDP candidate for Ottawa—Vanier in the 2018 provincial election	Ottawa		10,026	25.93	2nd
Renfrew—Nipissing—Pembroke	Kurt Stoll		Deep River	Nuclear engineer	6,872	17.10	2nd
Stormont—Dundas—South Glengarry	Wendy Stephen		Kingston	Teacher	4,982	13.80	3rd

== Greater Toronto Area ==
Riding	Candidate's Name	Notes	Residence	Occupation	Votes	%	Rank
Ajax	Christine Santos			Entrepreneur	6,291	16.69	3rd
Aurora—Oak Ridges—Richmond Hill	Reza Pourzad		North York	Teacher	2,501	7.68	3rd
Beaches—East York	Kate Dupuis			Clinical neuropsychologist/Professor at Sheridan College	13,500	33.21	2nd
Brampton Centre	Sara Singh	Member of Provincial Parliament for Brampton Centre (2018–2022); Deputy Leader of the Ontario New Democratic Party (2018–2022)			6,522	26.66	2nd
Brampton East	Gurratan Singh	Member of Provincial Parliament for Brampton East (2018–2022)		Lawyer	9,017	31.05	2nd
Brampton North	Sandeep Singh	Candidate for Caledon Town Council in the 2018 Caledon municipal election	Caledon	Marketing director/Small business owner	5,949	19.81	3rd
Brampton South	Andria Barrett		Brampton	Small business owner	5,475	19.14	3rd
Brampton West	Navjit Kaur		Brampton	Respiratory therapist	6,398	20.75	3rd
Burlington	Andrew Drummond	ONDP candidate for Burlington in the 2018 provincial election	Burlington	Communications manager	9,262	17.64	3rd
Davenport	Marit Stiles	Member of Provincial Parliament for Davenport (2018–present); President of the New Democratic Party (2016–2018); Toronto District School Board Trustee for Ward 9 (Davenport) (2014–2018)	Toronto	Researcher/Policy analyst	20,242	57.06	1st
Don Valley East	Mara-Elena Nagy			Teacher	4,355	15.51	3rd
Don Valley North	Ebrahim Astaraki			Educator	3,133	9.87	3rd
Don Valley West	Irwin Elman				3,392	9.23	3rd
Durham	Chris Borgia	President of the Durham Region Labour Council		Electrician	9,168	18.59	3rd
Eglinton—Lawrence	Natasha Doyle-Merrick				3,801	9.68	3rd
Etobicoke Centre	Heather Vickers-Wong	NDP candidate for Etobicoke Centre in the 2019 federal election	Etobicoke		3,906	8.61	3rd
Etobicoke—Lakeshore	Farheen Alim		South Etobicoke	Teacher	8,595	17.92	3rd
Etobicoke North	Aisha Jahangir	NDP candidate for Guelph in the 2021 and 2019 federal elections		Nurse	3,290	13.11	3rd
Humber River—Black Creek	Tom Rakocevic	Member of Provincial Parliament for Humber River—Black Creek (2018–present)		Executive assistant	7,959	34.49	1st
King—Vaughan	Samantha Sanchez	NDP candidate for King—Vaughan in the 2021 federal election	Bolton	Lawyer	2,840	6.94	3rd
Markham—Stouffville	Kingsley Kwok	ONDP candidate for Markham—Stouffville in the 2018 provincial election		Respiratory therapist	4,137	9.46	3rd
Markham—Thornhill	Matthew Henriques		Markham	Marketing professional	2,597	9.05	3rd
Markham—Unionville	Senthil Mahalingam			Factory worker	2,579	7.28	3rd
Milton	Katherine-Anne Cirlincione		Norval		3,777	9.70	3rd
Mississauga Centre	Sarah Walji	NDP candidate for Mississauga Centre in the 2019 federal election	Mississauga	Nurse	4,148	12.29	3rd
Mississauga East—Cooksville	Khawar Hussain				3,664	10.83	3rd
Mississauga—Erin Mills	Farina Hassan	ONDP candidate for Mississauga—Erin Mills in the 2018 provincial election			4,521	12.14	3rd
Mississauga—Lakeshore	Julia Kole				3,647	8.50	3rd
Mississauga—Malton	Waseem Ahmed	ONDP candidate in Mississauga East—Cooksville in the 2011 provincial election		Small business owner	5,140	17.71	3rd
Mississauga—Streetsville	Nicholas Rabba		Mississauga	Small business owner	4,554	11.99	3rd
Newmarket—Aurora	Denis Heng			Epidemiologist	5,281	12.72	3rd
Oakville	Maeve McNaughton				3,154	6.77	3rd
Oakville North—Burlington	Rhyan Vincent-Smith		Oakville	Small business owner	4,673	9.92	3rd
Oshawa	Jennifer French	Member of Provincial Parliament for Oshawa (2014–present)	Oshawa	Teacher	17,170	42.07	1st
Parkdale—High Park	Bhutila Karpoche	Member of Provincial Parliament for Oshawa (2018–2025)			23,024	53.97	1st
Pickering—Uxbridge	Khalid Ahmed	ONDP candidate for Don Valley East in the 2018 provincial election			6,934	16.04	3rd
Richmond Hill	Raymond Bhushan			University student	2,805	9.11	3rd
Scarborough—Agincourt	Benjamin Lee Truong				2,512	8.77	3rd
Scarborough Centre	Neethan Shan	Member of Toronto City Council for Ward 42 Scarborough—Rouge River (2017–2018); Toronto District School Board Trustee for Ward 21 Scarborough—Rouge River (2016–2017); York Region District School Board Trustee for Wards 7 and 8 (2006–2010)		Youth outreach worker	8,358	26.23	3rd
Scarborough—Guildwood	Veronica Javier				4,824	16.66	3rd
Scarborough North	Justin Kong				4,820	18.41	3rd
Scarborough—Rouge Park	Felicia Samuel	ONDP candidate for Scarborough—Rouge Park in the 2018 provincial election			7,742	21.92	3rd
Scarborough Southwest	Doly Begum	Member of Provincial Parliament for Scarborough Southwest (2018–present)	Scarborough, Toronto	Researcher/policy analyst	16,842	47.68	1st
Thornhill	Jasleen Kambo		Toronto	Journalist	2,698	7.82	3rd
Toronto Centre	Kristyn Wong-Tam	Member of Toronto City Council for Ward 13 Toronto Centre (2018–2022); Member of Toronto City Council for Ward 27 Toronto Centre-Rosedale (2010–2018)	Toronto	Small business owner	15,285	43.77	1st
Toronto—Danforth	Peter Tabuns	Member of Provincial Parliament for Toronto—Danforth (2006–present); Member of Toronto City Council (1990–1997)	Toronto	Former executive director of Greenpeace Canada	22,890	55.39	1st
Toronto—St. Paul's	Jill Andrew	Member of Provincial Parliament for Toronto—St. Paul's (2018–present)	Toronto	Educator	15,292	36.26	1st
University—Rosedale	Jessica Bell	Member of Provincial Parliament for University—Rosedale (2018–present)	Toronto	Lecturer at Toronto Metropolitan University	13,961	37.55	1st
Vaughan—Woodbridge	Will McCarty		Davenport, Toronto	IT professional	1,927	5.36	3rd
Whitby	Sara Labelle			Laboratory technician	10,524	22.83	2nd
Willowdale	Hal Berman	NDP candidate for Markham—Stouffville in the 2019 federal election			3,253	10.30	3rd
York Centre	Frank Chu			Social worker	3,935	13.99	3rd
York—Simcoe	Spencer Ki			Data analyst	4,083	11.15	3rd
York South—Weston	Faisal Hassan	Member of Provincial Parliament for York South—Weston (2018–2022)		Broadcaster/author	10,342	33.98	2nd

== Hamilton-Niagara ==
Riding	Candidate's Name	Notes	Residence	Occupation	Votes	%	Rank
Flamborough—Glanbrook	Allison Cillis			Teacher	9,995	22.74	2nd
Hamilton Centre	Andrea Horwath	Leader of the Ontario New Democratic Party (2009–2022); Member of Provincial Parliament for Hamilton Centre (2004–2022); Member of Hamilton City Council for Ward 2 (1997–2004)	Hamilton		16,690	57.26	1st
Hamilton East—Stoney Creek	Zaigham Butt		Hamilton	Accountant	9,614	27.34	2nd
Hamilton Mountain	Monique Taylor	Member of Provincial Parliament for Hamilton Mountain (2011–2025)	Hamilton		15,250	44.81	1st
Hamilton West—Ancaster—Dundas	Sandy Shaw	Member of Provincial Parliament for Hamilton West—Ancaster—Dundas (2018–present)	Hamilton	Former Director of the Hamilton Port Authority	18,197	40.42	1st
Niagara Centre	Jeff Burch	Member of Provincial Parliament for Niagara Centre (2018–present); Member of St. Catharines City Council (2006–2014)	Thorold	Union leader/Instructor at Brock University	16,360	39.70	1st
Niagara Falls	Wayne Gates	Member of Provincial Parliament for Niagara Falls (2014–present); Member of Niagara Falls City Council (2010–2014)	Niagara Falls	Union leader	24,207	48.08	1st
Niagara West	Dave Augustyn	Mayor of Pelham (2006–2018)	Fenwick	Policy consultant	8,658	20.71	2nd
St. Catharines	Jennie Stevens	Member of Provincial Parliament for St. Catharines (2018–present); Member of St. Catharines City Council (2003–2018)	St. Catharines	Non-profit executive	17,128	39.71	1st

== Northern Ontario ==
Riding	Candidate's Name	Notes	Residence	Occupation	Votes	%	Rank
Algoma—Manitoulin	Michael Mantha	Member of Provincial Parliament for St. Catharines (2011–2025)	Elliot Lake		11,252	45.93	1st
Kenora—Rainy River	JoAnne Formanek Gustafson				3,199	19.92	2nd
Kiiwetinoong	Sol Mamakwa	Member of Provincial Parliament for Kiiwetinoong (2018–present)	Sioux Lookout	Healthcare advisor	2,742	57.57	1st
Mushkegowuk—James Bay	Guy Bourgouin	Member of Provincial Parliament for Mushkegowuk—James Bay (2018–present)		Union leader	3,423	47.18	1st
Nickel Belt	France Gélinas	Member of Provincial Parliament for Nickel Belt (2007–present)	Naughton	Physiotherapist	15,611	50.77	1st
Nipissing	Erika Lougheed				8,665	28.26	2nd
Parry Sound—Muskoka	Erin Horvath	ONDP candidate for Parry Sound—Muskoka in the 2018 provincial election			3,427	7.69	3rd
Sault Ste. Marie	Michele McCleave-Kennedy	ONDP candidate for Sault Ste. Marie in the 2018 provincial election			10,029	37.30	2nd
Sudbury	Jamie West	Member of Provincial Parliament for Sudbury (2018–present)			12,013	40.85	1st
Thunder Bay—Atikokan	Judith Monteith-Farrell	Member of Provincial Parliament for Thunder Bay—Atikokan (2018–2022)	Thunder Bay	Union official	8,759	32.93	2nd
Thunder Bay—Superior North	Lise Vaugeois		Thunder Bay	Professor at Lakehead University/Musician	8,404	34.12	1st
Timiskaming—Cochrane	John Vanthof	Member of Provincial Parliament for Timiskaming—Cochrane (2011–present)	New Liskeard		9,735	42.74	1st
Timmins	Gilles Bisson	Member of Provincial Parliament for Timiskaming—Cochrane (2018–2022); Member of Provincial Parliament for Timmins—James Bay (1999–2018); Member of Provincial Parliament for Cochrane South (1990–1999)		Union leader	4,271	29.58	2nd

== Southwestern Ontario ==
Riding	Candidate's Name	Notes	Residence	Occupation	Votes	%	Rank
Brantford—Brant	Harvey Bischof	President of the Ontario Secondary School Teachers' Federation (2017–2021)		Teacher	13,283	28.29	2nd
Bruce—Grey—Owen Sound	Karen Gventer	ONDP candidate for Bruce—Grey—Owen Sound in the 2018 and 2014 provincial elections NDP candidate for Bruce—Grey—Owen Sound in the 2011 federal election	Hepworth	Public health official	5,817	13.91	3rd
Cambridge	Marjorie Knight	ONDP candidate for Cambridge in the 2018 provincial election	Cambridge	Social worker	8,745	22.19	2nd
Chatham-Kent—Leamington	Brock McGregor	Member of Chatham-Kent Municipal Council for Ward 6–Chatham (2014–present)	Chatham	Healthcare professional	11,163	30.28	2nd
Elgin—Middlesex—London	Andy Kroeker		London	Healthcare professional	7,973	18.21	2nd
Essex	Ron Leclair	Greater Essex County District School Board Trustee for Lasalle and Amherstburg (2014–present)	Lasalle	Police officer	13,793	28.28	2nd
Guelph	James Parr		Guelph	Business operations analyst	4,402	8.06	4th
Haldimand—Norfolk	Sarah Lowe		Caledonia	Union official	6,311	13.89	3rd
Huron—Bruce	Laurie Hazzard		Bayfield	Nurse/Educator	7,679	16.38	3rd
Kitchener Centre	Laura Mae Lindo	Member of Provincial Parliament for Kitchener Centre (2018–2023)			15,789	40.59	1st
Kitchener—Conestoga	Karen Meissner	Waterloo Region District School Board Trustee for Wellesley–Woolwich (2018–2022)	Elmira	Small business owner	10,851	28.87	2nd
Kitchener South—Hespeler	Joanne Weston	Waterloo Region District School Board Trustee for Kitchener (2018–present)	Kitchener		9,118	26.43	2nd
Lambton—Kent—Middlesex	Vanessa Benoit			Librarian	7,987	18.84	2nd
London—Fanshawe	Teresa Armstrong	Member of Provincial Parliament for London—Fanshawe (2011–present)	London	Insurance professional	16,123	47.20	1st
London North Centre	Terence Kernaghan	Member of Provincial Parliament for London North Centre (2018–present)	London	Teacher	17,082	39.65	1st
London West	Peggy Sattler	Member of Provincial Parliament for London West (2013–present)	London	Policy analyst	22,510	45.13	1st
Oxford	Lindsay Wilson		Alvinston	Librarian	9,504	21.44	2nd
Perth—Wellington	Jo-Dee Burbach	Member of Stratford City Council (2018–present)	Stratford	Small business owner/Graphic designer	9,170	22.04	2nd
Sarnia—Lambton	Dylan Stelpstra		Sarnia	Child protection worker	9,489	23.62	2nd
Waterloo	Catherine Fife	Member of Provincial Parliament for Waterloo (2012–present)	Waterloo	Researcher	20,615	45.89	1st
Wellington—Halton Hills	Diane Ballantyne	Member of Wellington County Council for Ward 6 (2018–present); ONDP candidate in Wellington—Halton Hills for the 2018 provincial election	Fergus	Teacher	7,724	15.61	2nd
Windsor—Tecumseh	Gemma Grey-Hall		Windsor	Educator	11,551	29.96	2nd
Windsor West	Lisa Gretzky	Member of Provincial Parliament for Windsor West (2014–present); Greater Essex County District School Board Trustee (2008–2014)	Windsor	Event planner	13,395	42.19	1st
