= 2018 Peel Region municipal elections =

2018 Peel Region chair election
- October 22, 2018

Peel Region municipal elections, 2018, were part of the larger Ontario municipal elections, that took place on Monday, October 22.

After ballots were cast, Patrick Brown was elected as the mayor of Brampton, Bonnie Crombie re-elected as the mayor of Mississauga and Allan Thompson re-elected as the mayor of Caledon.

The election was intended to be the first ever direct election of the Peel Regional chair. However, the election of this position was cancelled after the Doug Ford government introduced The Better Local Government Act, 2018 (Bill 5) in August 2018.

== Open races ==
Jim Tovey, Mississauga councillor for Ward 1, died suddenly in January 2018. Tovey was in the midst of planning for massive waterfront redevelopment.

In February 2018, Brampton councillor Chris Gibson announced his retirement in Wards 1 & 5. Officially a city councillor, he had been given the city's additional Regional seat for multiple terms. Regional councillor Elaine Moore, from the same wards, announced her retirement in late March.

Gael Miles retirement was made public the evening before the start of registration. Caledon's Doug Beffort retired.

== Peel Region chair ==
=== Original nomination process ===
In 2016, the provincial Liberal government announced voters in the 2018 election would elect regional chairs. Across the province, the selection of regional chairs varies, with some regional councils electing chairs while other chairs being selected by councillors. Peel Region traditionally appointed the regional chair from existing councillors.

In early 2018, the candidates for the position of regional chair began to be nominated.

Starting the year "85% sure" he would run, Ron Starr officially announced his intention to run for Regional Chair in late March 2018. Later, after the cancellation of the position, Starr withdrew to run for re-election in Ward 6.

Rumours that were circulating of Patrick Brown running for Regional chair were neither confirmed or denied, when asked by Metroland in May 2018. Brown was accused of sexual misconduct in January, which he denies, forcing his resignation as Progressive Conservative Party of Ontario leader. He moved to Mississauga after being removed from the party caucus. He did not run for re-election as a Barrie MPP in the June provincial election. Patrick Brown also withdrew from the race.

Mississauga councillor Nando Iannicca enrolled in July.

Bob Delaney, former MPP for Mississauga-Streetsville, registered in July. Charles Sousa and Harinder Takhar, also former MPPs, agreed to not run, in an effort to not split the vote.

Registered candidates included:

- Amir S. Ali, Brampton
- Parveen Dalal, Mississauga
- Bob Delaney, Mississauga
- Vitya Sagar Gautam, Brampton
- Marcin Huniewicz, Brampton
- Nando Iannicca, Mississauga
- Masood Khan, Brampton
- Ken Looy, Brampton
- Gurpreet Pabla, Brampton

A shift in Ontario's government after the provincial elections, saw Doug Ford announce the cancellation of the voter elected position of regional chair in Peel.

While this prompted Brown to pull his Chair nomination, to run for Mayor of Brampton, Delaney continued his campaign, noting that the law had yet to pass.

Incumbent Frank Dale has indicated he may change his mind on retirement, according to The Mississauga News.

=== Appointment process ===
TVO journalist Steve Paikin has heard suggestion of the following candidates:

- Nando Iannicca
- Linda Jeffrey
- Gael Miles
- Elaine Moore
- Charles Sousa

Former Caledon Regional councillor Barb Shaughnessy, who had run for Mayor of Caledon, indicated that she would not be pursuing the position.

== Brampton ==
2018 Brampton mayoral election
- October 22, 2018
- Turnout: 34.50%
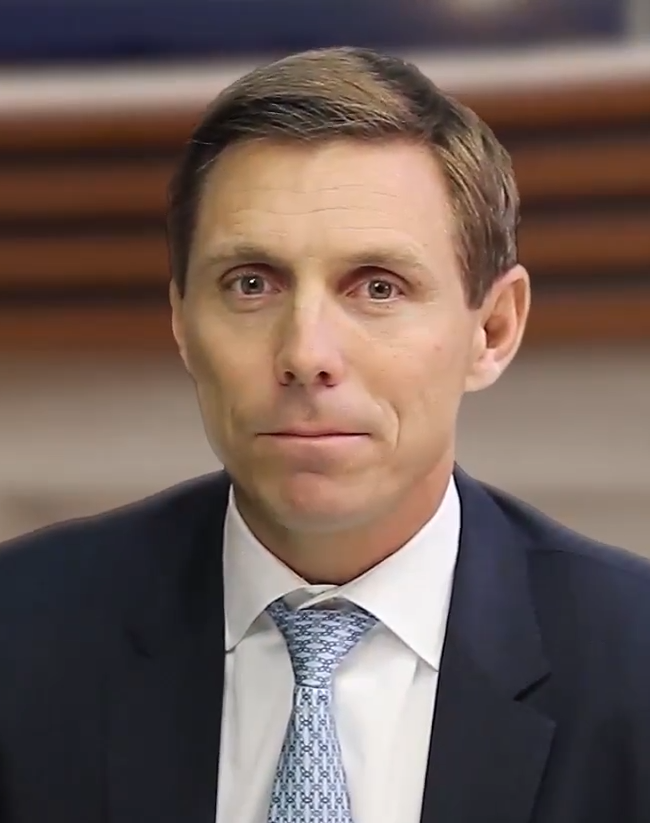

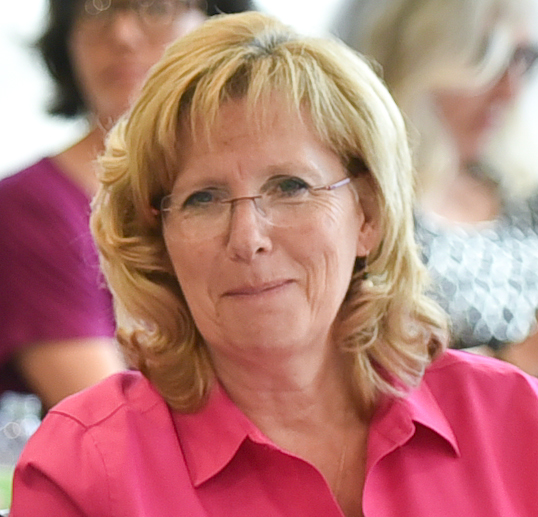

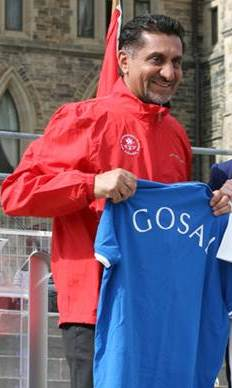
Candidate	Patrick Brown	Linda Jeffrey	Bal Gosal
Popular vote	46,894	42,993	5,319
Percentage	44.43%	40.73%	5.04%
Mayor before election
Linda Jeffrey
Elected mayor
Patrick Brown

Brampton had 313,273 eligible voters during the 2018 election. A total of 169 voting locations were open across the city.

=== Mayor ===
In October 2017, incumbent Brampton Mayor Linda Jeffrey announced her intent to run for a second term.

Real estate lawyer Wesley Jackson was noted in a February 2018 Peel Daily News article as "hoping to become Brampton's next mayor."

In July, John Sprovieri announced his intention to run for Mayor of Brampton. Omar Mansoury withdrew.

On Election Day on October 22, Patrick Brown was declared the winner.

Mayoral Candidate	Vote	%
Patrick Brown	46,894	44.43
Linda Jeffrey (X)	42,993	40.73
Baljit Gosal	5,319	5.04
John Sprovieri	5,028	4.76
Wesley Jackson	2,442	2.31
Vinod Kumar Mahesan	1,905	1.80
Mansoor Ameersulthan	972	0.92

==== Debates ====
Brampton Board of Trade is hosting debates of city council candidates throughout the day on September 17, 2018, through live stream, concluding with a Mayoral debate. Brown, Gosal, Jackson, Jeffrey, and Sprovieri were invited to the event. Questions were pre-selected from membership. According to the Guardian, the majority of the event saw "Brown and Sprovieri focusing much of their attention on Jeffrey's record and vice versa."

The first Mayoral debate to allow physical attendance will be held September 20, 2018, at Sheridan College, Davis Campus, through The Pointer, an online news outlet for Brampton.

Brampton Focus hosted a debate on September 25 at the Rose Theatre Brampton, inviting Jeffrey, Brown, Gosal, and Sprovieri. Media reports suggest that the debate was often drowned out by cheering and jeering.

A debate was held by the Brampton Real Estate Board on October 4. All candidates were in attendance.

Prime Asia TV Canada hosted a debate on October 18.

==== Endorsements ====
===== Patrick Brown =====
- Bill Davis, former Premier of Ontario
- Garnett Manning, former Brampton City Councillor
- Victor Oh, Canadian Senator

===== Linda Jeffrey =====
- Richard Ciano, former Ontario PC Party president
- Michael Diamond, Doug Ford's campaign manager
- Ken Zeise, former Ontario PC Party president
- MPPs Prabmeet Sarkaria, Gurratan Singh, Sara Singh, and Kevin Yarde
- MPs Ruby Sahota and Sonia Sidhu

Jeffrey held a fundraiser at the Albany Club of Toronto, a venue associated with the Conservative Party.

==== Polling ====
Forum Research, released October 19, 2018

40%	40%	7%	14%
Linda Jeffrey	Patrick Brown	John Sprovieri	Other

Incumbent Linda Jeffrey and candidate Patrick Brown both polled at 40%, John Sprovieri polled at 7%, Wesley Jackson at 5%, Bal Gosal at 4%, Vinod Kumar Mahesan at 4%, and Mansoor Ameersulthan at 1%.

Mainstreet Research, taken October 19, 2018

43.9%	39.3%	6.6%	4.6%
Patrick Brown	Linda Jeffrey	John Sprovieri	Bal Gosal

Mainstreet's numbers were based on decided voters; 5.6% of voters were voting for other candidates. The complete survey found 17.4% of all voters were undecided.

=== Regional council ===
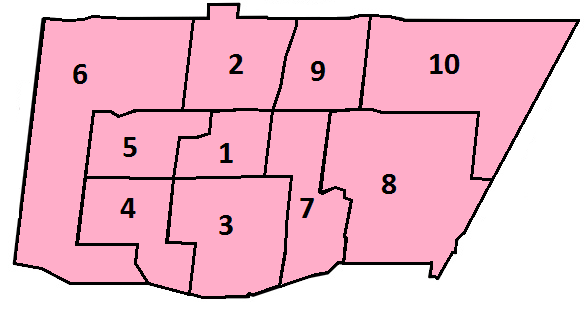
Map of Brampton's wards

==== Ward 1 & 5 ====
Moffat, Rai, Russo, and Vicente attended the Brampton Board of Trade debate.

Of the candidates, only McClelland has held political office, as a Liberal MPP. He surrendered his law license in 2015, after allegations of professional misconduct.

Russo is a citizen member of the city's Committee of Adjustment, serving as its chair.

Regional Councillor Wards 1 & 5	Vote	%
Paul Vicente	7,593	43.66
Mario Russo	5,514	31.71
Carman McClelland	1,311	7.54
Rajbir Kaur	1,198	6.89
Harnek Rai	1,178	6.77
Charles Moffatt	596	3.43

==== Ward 2 & 6 ====
Bains, Campbell, Jones, and Palleschi attended the Brampton Board of Trade debate.

Ward 2 & 6 Candidate	Vote	%
Michael Palleschi (X)	7,340	35.55
Gurpreet Kaur Bains	5,971	28.92
Everton Dwight Campbell	2,726	13.20
Allan Jones	2,035	9.86
Raghav Patel	895	4.34
Shannon Iyer	743	3.60
Lateef Khaliq	644	3.12
Nisha Luthra	291	1.41

==== Ward 3 & 4 ====
Martin Medeiros won the wards over Shan Gill in 2014, by 100 votes. Incumbent Martin Medeiros lived in Mississauga in 2014, but began a move to Brampton, allowing him to run in the election. Resident Peter Bailey filed a legal proceeding to try and remove Medeiros from office, but was unsuccessful. The action was in advance of a vote on the then-Hurontario Main Light Rail Transit project, which Medeiros wanted and Bailey did not.

Former incumbent John Sanderson is a nominee for 2018; he ran for Mayor of Brampton in 2014, finishing second. Sanderson has noted that the 2018 campaign is the "dirtiest" he's experienced, blaming Medeiros for the tone.

Grewal, Kus, Medeiros, and Sanderson attended the Brampton Board of Trade debate.

Ward 3 & 4 Candidate	Vote	%
Martin Medeiros (X)	7,551	38.83
John Sanderson	6,175	31.75
Prabhjot Grewal	4,059	20.87
Chirag Patel	1,336	6.87
Joseph Kus	326	1.68

==== Ward 7 & 8 ====
Pat Fortini is the incumbent for the wards.

Cody Vatcher has been critical of Mayor Jeffrey, suggesting that she "simply never learned to graciously accept defeat," when her votes were defeated. He also campaigned on standing up to an incumbent who hasn't “stood up for our fair share” and “rolled out the red carpet” for certain health care announcements.

Bruce Marshall has the endorsement of retiring incumbent Gael Miles.

All of the candidates attended the Brampton Board of Trade debate.

Ward 7 & 8 Candidate	Vote	%
Pat Fortini (X)	10,299	52.65
Bruce Marshall	4,469	22.85
Ajay Tandon	3,714	18.99
Cody Vatcher	1,078	5.51

==== Ward 9 & 10 ====
All three candidates attended the Brampton Board of Trade debate.

Ward 7 & 8 Candidate	Vote	%
Gurpreet Singh Dhillon	14,330	55.46
Michelle Shaw	6,272	24.27
Vicky Dhillon	5,238	20.27

Amratlal Mistry withdrew from the race.

=== City council ===
==== Ward 1 & 5 ====
- Sanjeev Bansal
- Princess Boucher
- Abdul Qayyum Chaudhry
- Imtiaz Haider
- Harmanpreet Mankoo
- Karanjit Singh Pandher
- Don Patel
- Joe Pimentel
- Daryl Romeo
- Rowena Santos
- Josephine Tatangelo

Boucher, Pimentel, Santos, and Tatangelo attended the Brampton Board of Trade debate.

Pimentel spent 30 years as a City of Brampton employee.

Candidate	Vote	%
Rowena Santos	7,160	41.34
Joe Pimentel	2,647	15.28
Don Patel	1,883	10.87
Daryl Romeo	1,111	6.41
Princess Boucher	856	4.94
Josephine Tatangelo	856	4.94
Abdul Qayyum Chaudhry	843	4.87
Karanjit Singh Pandher	814	4.70
Sanjeev Bansal	586	3.38
Imtiaz Haider	290	1.67
Harmanpreet Mankoo	274	1.58

==== Ward 2 & 6 ====
- Jermaine Chambers
- Ojie F. Eghobor
- Paul Mann
- Jim McDowell
- Lisa Pearce
- M. Joseph Shaji
- Joe Sidhu
- Anwar Warsi
- Doug Whillans, incumbent

Gurpreet Kaur Bains has withdrawn.

Chambers, Mann, and Pearce attended the Brampton Board of Trade debate. Whillans, chair of a hospital fundraiser golf tournament, was unable to attend. The tournament was scheduled in March.

Candidate	Vote	%
Doug Whillans (X)	5,968	28.99
Jermaine Chambers	3,238	15.73
Jim McDowell	2,859	13.89
Joe Sidhu	2,319	11.27
Paul Mann	1,886	9.16
Lisa Pearce	1,868	9.07
M. Joseph Shaji	906	4.40
Anwar Warsi	797	3.87
Ojie F. Eghobor	744	3.61

==== Ward 3 & 4 ====
- Jeff Bowman, incumbent
- Parin Choksi
- Harpreet Singh Hansra
- Omar Mansoury
- Ryan Rennie
- Nishi Sidhu
- Tanveer Singh

Hansra and Rennie attended the Brampton Board of Trade debate. Incumbent Bowman was unable to attend, due to the debate being scheduled against a hospital fundraising golf tournament, of which he is vice-chair, and had been scheduled since March. Candidate Nishi Sidhu also cited a "previous engagement", and Omar Mansoury accepted the invitation but did not attend.

Bowman has taken time off work at City Hall to campaign, noting that other incumbents continued to collect a wage during their campaigning.

Candidate	Vote	%
Jeff Bowman (X)	9,950	52.12
Harpreet Singh Hansra	4,361	22.84
Nishi Sidhu	1,515	7.94
Parin Choksi	1,358	7.11
Ryan Rennie	891	4.67
Omar Mansoury	698	3.66
Tanveer Singh	317	1.66

==== Ward 7 & 8 ====
- Karla Bailey
- Harveen Dhaliwal
- Sam Kunjicka
- Drew Riedstra
- Cheryl Rodricks
- Gurvinder Singh
- Martin Singh
- Mokshi Virk
- Charmaine Williams

Martin Singh and Charmaine Williams were in attendance at the Brampton Board of Trade debate.

Dhaliwal's election advertising is shared with Region incumbent Pat Fortini.

Candidate	Vote	%
Charmaine Williams	5,086	25.76
Martin Singh	4,403	22.30
Karla Bailey	3,489	17.67
Harveen Dhaliwal	3,364	17.04
Cheryl Rodricks	1,003	5.08
Drew Riedstra	824	4.17
Gurvinder Singh	712	3.61
Sam Kunjicka	512	2.59
Mokshi Virk	348	1.76

==== Ward 9 & 10 ====
- Mangaljit Dabb
- Michael Farquharson
- Dharmaveer Gohil
- Mahendra Gupta
- Rohit Sidhu
- Harkirat Singh
- Naresh Tharani

Dabb, Farquharson, Singh, and Tharani attended the Brampton Board of Trade debate whilst various other prominent debates have included Singh, Dabb, Gupta and Sidhu among the candidates.

Candidate	Vote	%
Harkirat Singh	10,804	42.87
Michael Farquharson	4,629	18.37
Rohit Sidhu	3,894	15.45
Dharmaveer Gohil	1,922	7.63
Mangaljit Dabb	1,437	5.70
Mahendra Gupta	1,303	5.17
Naresh Tharani	1,214	4.82

== Caledon ==
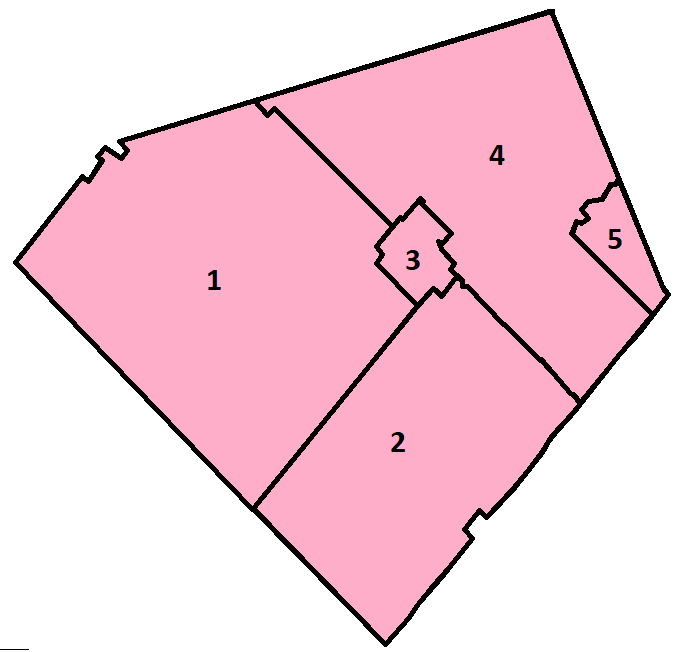
Map of Caledon's wards

=== Mayor ===
In January 2018, Allan Thompson confirmed that he'd be seeking re-election.

Mayor, registered candidates

- Kelly Darnley
- Barb Shaughnessy
- Allan Thompson, incumbent

Candidate	Vote	%
Allan Thompson (X)	7,392	45.37
Barb Shaughnessy	4,976	30.54
Kelly Darnley	3,925	24.09

==== Debates ====
On September 24, the candidates discussed Bolton development at the Inglewood Community Centre.

A Mayoral debate, which would have also been a debate for Ward 5 councillors, was scheduled and cancelled. A resident organized a new debate, for October 9. The event had extensive debate on a new paramedic deployment model.

=== Council ===
Rob Mezzapelli and Doug Beffort are both retiring from area council. Gord McClure has yet to announce intent.

==== Ward 1 Area Councillor ====
- Dwayne Jackson
- Lynn Kiernan
- Robert Rees
- Mauro Testani

William Motley-Bailey was registered, but withdrew.

Candidate	Vote	%
Lynn Kiernan	945	34.09
Dwayne Jackson	915	33.01
Mauro Testani	577	20.82
Robert Rees	335	12.09

==== Ward 1 Regional Councillor ====
- William Motley-Bailey
- Ian Sinclair
- Tom Sweeney
- Jim Wallace

Candidate	Vote	%
Ian Sinclair	1,219	43.33
Tom Sweeney	885	31.46
Jim Wallace	650	23.11
William Motley-Bailey	59	2.10

==== Ward 2 Area Councillor ====
In 2022, Singh won the NDP riding nomination for Brampton North, supplanting incumbent MPP Kevin Yarde.

- Brian Dunn
- Christina Early
- Christopher Gilmer
- John N. Rutter
- Sandeep Singh

Candidate	Vote	%
Christina Early	1,796	44.70
Sandeep Singh	1,193	29.69
Christopher Gilmer	447	11.12
Brian Dunn	372	9.26
John N. Rutter	210	5.23

==== Ward 2 Regional Councillor ====
Downey's campaign literature included free children's passes for the Brampton Fall Fair, passes available for free at schools and stores. Corrigan has objected to the practice, as a possible breach of municipal campaign laws.

- Kevin Corrigan
- Johanna Downey, incumbent

Candidate	Vote	%
Johanna Downey (X)	3,013	76.67
Kevin Corrigan	917	23.33

==== Ward 3 & 4 Area Councillor ====
- Cheryl Connors
- Nick deBoer, incumbent

Candidate	Vote	%
Nick deBoer (X)	2,319	56.19
Cheryl Connors	1,808	43.81

==== Ward 3 & 4 Regional Councillor ====
- Derek Clark
- Jennifer Innis, incumbent

Candidate	Vote	%
Jennifer Innis (X)	2,877	68.50
Derek Clark	1,323	31.50

==== Ward 5 Area Councillor ====
Candidates for Ward 5 Regional and Area Councillor, as well as Mayoral candidates, will appear in a debate organized by a resident, after a scheduled debate was cancelled.

- Steve Conforti
- Joe Luschak
- Tony Rosa

Candidate	Vote	%
Tony Rosa	2,066	40.77
Steve Conforti	2,036	40.17
Joe Luschak	966	19.06

==== Ward 5 Regional Councillor ====
- Annette Groves, incumbent
- Angela Panacci

Candidate	Vote	%
Annette Groves (X)	3,150	60.81
Angela Panacci	2,030	39.19

== Mississauga ==
During the campaign, former Mississauga News editor John Stewart noted that the election was marked by a dearth of information or debates, in contrast to previous elections.

=== Mayor ===
2018 Mississauga Mayoral election
- October 22, 2018
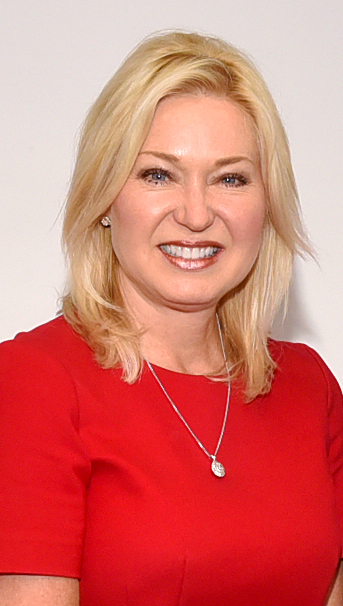
Candidate	Bonnie Crombie	Kevin J. Johnston
Party	Independent	Independent
Popular vote	91,422	16,079
Percentage	76.7%	13.5%
Mayor before election
Bonnie Crombie
Elected mayor
Bonnie Crombie

Bonnie Crombie was the incumbent and re-elected with a substantial majority on October 22, 2018.

Kevin J. Johnston announced his intention to run in March 2018. Peel Regional Police charged Johnston in July 2017 with "willfully promoting hatred, a charge under the Criminal Code of Canada that carries a maximum penalty of two years in jail," according to Mississauga News. Johnston withdrew his mayoral candidacy on July 25 and registered to run for Ward 9 city councillor instead. Then on July 26, withdrew his councillor candidacy and re-registered as a mayoral candidate. Johnston stated in September to be talking with four organizations a day. Johnston ran for the same position in the previous election, placing 11th out of 15.

Mayoral Candidate	Vote	%
Bonnie Crombie (X)	91,422	76.68
Kevin J. Johnston	16,079	13.49
Scott E. W. Chapman	4,563	3.83
Andrew Lee	2,970	2.49
Mohsin Khan	1,458	1.22
Yasmin Pouragheli	996	0.84
Tiger Meng Wu	989	0.83
Syed Qumber Rizvi	752	0.63

Debates

University of Toronto Mississauga Students’ Union hosted a debate on October 4, that was attended by Chapman, Crombie, Lee, Pouragheli, and Rizvi. They confirmed that Johnston was not invited.

=== Council ===
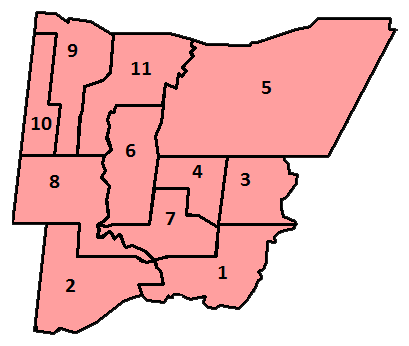
Map of Mississauga's wards

==== Ward 1 ====
Dave Cook was the appointed incumbent for Ward 1. As per promise on receiving the position, he did not stand for election in the 2018 contest. Cook replaced elected councillor Jim Tovey, who died in January 2018.

Former Conservative Party of Canada federal MP Brad Butt, currently the Mississauga Board of Trade Director of Government Relations, is a notable candidate. Butt also considered running in Ward 6, but changed his intentions when Ron Starr re-entered that race, after the cancellation of the Regional Chair election.

Kristian Velkoski withdrew to run for a public school board trustee.

An all-candidates debate was held September 19, by ratepayers' groups; Marco Pedri did not attend. Topics discussed including speeding reduction, the Lakeview zoning by-law, and cannabis stores. The ward was later profiled by Mississauga News. Three residents' associations held another debate, featuring Burke, Butt, Dasko, Hart, Roque and Setaram. The remaining candidates, Mancini and Pedri, did not attend.

Ward 1 Candidate	Vote	%
Stephen Dasko	4,484	47.59
Brad Butt	2,188	23.22
Natalie Hart	1,472	15.62
Miles Roque	656	6.96
Sharmila Setaram	318	3.37
Terry Burke	206	2.19
Larry Mancini	75	0.80
Marco Pedri	24	0.25

==== Ward 2 ====
The incumbent is Karen Ras. She was unopposed until the final week of nominations.

Ward 2 Candidate	Vote	%
Karen Ras (X)	7,820	92.77
Naser Ansari	375	4.45
Mohammad Azam	234	2.78

==== Ward 3 ====
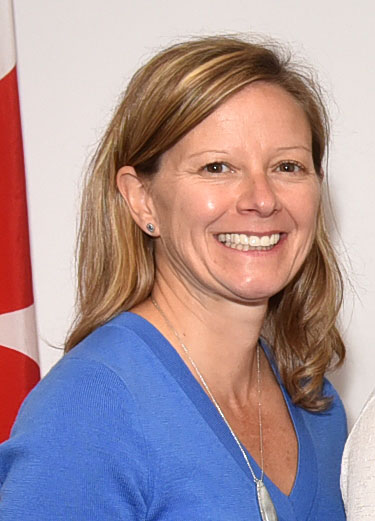
Fonseca in 2017.

The ward incumbent is Chris Fonseca.

Ward 3 Candidate	Vote	%
Chris Fonseca (X)	8,337	74.28
Robert Kielek	2,149	19.15
Khawar Hussain	604	5.38
Arshad Hashmi	134	1.19

==== Ward 4 ====
The ward incumbent is John Kovac.

Ward 4 Candidate	Vote	%
John Kovac (X)	5,818	52.71
Grant G. Gorchynski	2,316	20.98
Safeeya Faruqui	1,123	10.17
Josephine Bau	501	4.54
Hardat Sookraj	411	3.72
Yoliana Azer	277	2.51
Duc Thanh Tran	266	2.41
Hugo Reinoso	174	1.58
Nawres Fouad	152	1.38

==== Ward 5 ====
The Ward 5 incumbent is Carolyn Parrish.

Nikki Clarke was registered as a candidate, but disqualified. Clarke had waited until the last day of the nomination period to file her papers, and was soliciting signatures from City staff. This prompted incumbent Carolyn Parrish to ask for a review of the paperwork by the Clerk's department. A total of 8 discrepancies were found in signatures, and the nominee was not allowed to replace those signatures. Clarke came a close second in the 2018 provincial election, running for the NDP in Mississauga—Malton.

Some of the candidates talked to the Mississauga News about issues important to them. Malton Community Building Project hosted a candidate event on October 9.

Ward 5 Candidate	Vote	%
Carolyn Parrish (X)	6,798	63.87
David Broadway	1,161	10.91
Ram Pawar	1,026	9.64
Ahmad Khan	892	8.38
Marina Qureshi	452	4.25
Alex Itty	315	2.96

==== Ward 6 ====
Incumbent councillor Ron Starr was in his third term on council when on March 28 at a city council session he announced his intention to run for the newly elected Region of Peel Chair. Fourteen candidates entered the race to succeed Starr for the open seat with Joe Horneck being the first to register. July 23 one week before the filing deadline Starr decided to drop out of contention for Regional Chair with that race had 10 candidates including former PC leader Patrick Brown (now Brampton Mayor) and Starr re-registered for his incumbent ward, suggesting that he could do more in his existing position then as regional chair. Starr was successful in winning re-election with Ward 6 by a margin of 347 votes proving the closest contest in the city, even though two other wards had no incumbents. Mississauga News columnist John Stewart summarized the race by saying most of the city was a status quo election however "Horneck's loss is more politically impressive than most wins elsewhere. He almost unseated an entrenched council vet in a stable ward. As it is, he's Ward 6 councillor in waiting."

Tahir Ali, Syed Mohammad Jaffery, Fazli Manan, and Avtar Minhas have withdrawn.

Ward 6 Candidate	Vote	%
Ron Starr (X)	4,859	36.24
Joe Horneck	4,512	33.66
Gary Gu	1,577	11.76
Muhammad Haroon	612	4.57
Anil Sinha	534	3.98
Al De Ascentiis	410	3.06
Elie Diab	294	2.19
Rob Torry	188	1.40
Moezzam Alvi	184	1.37
Ash Srivastava	154	1.15
Sambasiva Vatti	82	0.61

==== Ward 7 ====
Incumbent councillor Nando Iannicca retired from this riding, and re-emerged later in the nomination period as a candidate for Chair of the Region of Peel.

Dipika Damerla, former MPP for Mississauga East—Cooksville and Minister of Seniors Affairs, announced her candidacy for the ward in mid-July.

Ward 7 Candidate	Vote	%
Dipika Damerla	4,566	41.25
Andrew Gassmann	1,762	15.92
Leslie Zurek-Silvestri	1,399	12.64
Lee Ann Cole	822	7.43
Marco Camaioni	598	5.40
Louroz Mercader	574	5.19
Dawid Burzynski	474	4.28
Maqbool Walji	252	2.28
Samir Jisri	215	1.94
Leslie N Moss	179	1.62
Winston Harding	157	1.42
Peter Michael van Sluytman	70	0.63

==== Ward 8 ====
The incumbent is Matt Mahoney. He was unopposed until the final week of nominations.

Ward 8 Candidate	Vote	%
Matt Mahoney (X)	9,979	79.69
Grzegorz Nowacki	714	5.70
Adam Etwell	600	4.79
Tariq Ali Shah	535	4.27
Abdul Azeem Baig	413	3.30
Amadeus Blazys	281	2.24

==== Ward 9 ====
The incumbent is Pat Saito. She was unopposed until the final week of nominations.

Kevin J. Johnston was briefly nominated in the ward.

Ward 9 Candidate	Vote	%
Pat Saito (X)	7,732	77.93
Curtis DeBonte	831	8.38
Syed Mohammad Jaffery	644	6.49
Paul Lopez	542	5.46
Rafael Kalamat	173	1.74

==== Ward 10 ====
Candidate Mazin Al-Ezzi got into an extended spat with a Ward 10 resident over lawn sign, using "derogatory language" and insulting "the residents repeatedly." Incumbent Sue McFadden described the incident as "scary", while Al-Ezzi says that the resident tried to goad him on every time he intended to leave.

Ward 10 Candidate	Vote	%
Sue McFadden (X)	10,438	90.11
Mazin Al-Ezzi	604	5.21
Savita Sangwan	541	4.67

==== Ward 11 ====
The incumbent in the ward is George Carlson. The candidates have talked to Mississauga News about issues important to them.

Ward 11 Candidate	Vote	%
George Carlson (X)	6,581	68.98
Imran Hasan	2,110	22.12
Pardeep Kumar Khunger	850	8.91

== Peel District School Board ==
=== Brampton Wards 1, 5 ===
- Claudette Alcock
- Rajwinder Ghuman
- David Green, incumbent
- Yusuf Khan
- Rita Persaud
- Stan Taylor

=== Brampton Wards 2, 6 ===
- Arun Thomas Alex
- Alex Battick
- William Davies
- Harjot Singh Gill
- Andrew Mendoza
- Mansoor Mirza
- Faraz Saleem
- Raman Vasudev
- Odoi Yemoh

The incumbent is Suzanne Nurse.

=== Brampton Wards 3, 4 ===
- Shahbaz Altaf
- Prabhjot Kainth
- Harbandna Kaur
- Kathy McDonald, incumbent
- Seema Shah
- Faisal Tahir
- Radha Tailor

Hiteshkumar Prajapati, Raman Rakkar, and Vipul Shah withdrew their nominations.

=== Brampton Wards 7, 8 ===
- Zain Ali
- Carrie Andrews, incumbent
- Andrea Francis-Bucknor
- Michael J. Gyovai
- Lynne Lazare
- Garner F. Liverpool
- Jashan Singh

=== Brampton Wards 9, 10 ===
- Chetan Brahmbhatt
- Albert Evans
- Janice Gordon
- Theresa Guidolin
- Satpaul Singh Johal
- Mazhar Khan
- Ashman Khroad
- Sia Lakhanpal
- Khushpal Pawar
- Dipal Shah
- Balbir Sohi
- Shilpa Vij-Sharma

Harkirat Singh, incumbent, is running for council.

=== Caledon ===
Basmat and Cameron debated the issues at an October 9 event.

- Dmytro Basmat
- Stan Cameron, incumbent
- Amandeep Singh

=== Mississauga Ward 1, 7 ===
- Husain Aboghodieh
- Paul Liu
- John Marchant
- Dalia Morad
- Maxamed Ibraahim Osso
- Catherine Soplet
- Suresh Subramaniam
- Kristian Velkoski
- John F. Walmark

Incumbent Janet McDougald has announced her retirement.

=== Mississauga Ward 2, 8 ===
- Charles Chen
- Minh Goi
- Meredith Johnson
- Brad MacDonald, incumbent
- Jasjit Singh

=== Mississauga Ward 3, 4 ===
- Vijay Brahmbhatt
- Ahmed Jalal
- Sue Lawton, incumbent
- Asha Luthra
- Naila Mahmood
- Norma Fay Nicholson
- Lovely Shankar

=== Mississauga Ward 5 ===
- Susan Benjamin
- Avtar Ghotra
- Ryan Gurcharn
- Bassam Johar
- Arwinder Kalsi
- Jal Panthaky
- Rajakumaran Ponraj
- Sarah Walji

Rick Williams was the incumbent.

=== Mississauga Ward 6, 11 ===
- Raj Chopra
- Imrana Choudry
- Robert Crocker, incumbent
- Tina Daid
- Jith Dravin
- Glynis D'Souza
- Dharmarajah Gnanakumar
- Harjinder Jheetey
- David Li
- Mian Omer Rasheed
- George Varghese

Hasan Imam has withdrawn.

=== Mississauga Ward 9, 10 ===
- John Bebawy
- Nokha Dakroub, incumbent
- Victoria Ghandour
- LeeAnn Lloyd
- Tahir Malik
- Christopher Stuart Taylor

Lili Schermel has withdrawn.

== Dufferin-Peel Catholic District School Board ==
=== Brampton Wards 1, 3, 4 ===
- Anna da Silva, incumbent
- Hope Irabor Dion
- Patrick J. Doran
- Cheryl Roy

=== Brampton Wards 2, 5, 6 ===
- Darryl Brian D'Souza, incumbent
- Damien Joseph
- Theresa Laverty
- Neville Mant
- Vincenzo Siciliano

=== Brampton Wards 7, 8, 9, 10 ===
Incumbent Shawn Xaviour was declared by acclamation.

=== Caledon/Dufferin ===
A trustee candidate debate was held on October 9, however only Roman showed up for the event.

- Frank Di Cosola, incumbent
- Sheralyn Roman

=== Mississauga Ward 1, 3 ===
Incumbent Mario Pascucci was declared by acclamation.

=== Mississauga Ward 2, 8 ===
- Sharon M. Hobin, incumbent
- Matthew Kornas

=== Mississauga Ward 4 ===
- John Coletti
- Carmela Kapeleris
- Biju Pappachan
- Stefano Pascucci
- Miroslaw Ruta
- Mathew Thomas

Anna Abbruscato is the incumbent.

=== Mississauga Ward 5 ===
- Margaret Pakula
- Caroline Roach
- Thomas Thomas, incumbent

=== Mississauga Ward 6, 11 ===
- Luz del Rosario, incumbent
- Bismarck Gonsalves
- Sabeena Philip

Glynis D'Souza withdrew.

=== Mississauga Ward 7 ===
Incumbent Bruno Iannicca was declared by acclamation.

=== Mississauga Ward 9, 10 ===
- Tom Cook
- Brea Corbet
- Tomasz Glod
- Mathew Jacob
- Vlad Kagramanov
- John G. Kennedy
- Nestor Pereira

The incumbent is Esther O'Toole.

== French school boards ==
Trustee, Conseil scolaire Viamonde

- Yvon Rochefort
- Goran Saveski
- Qandeel Tariq Shah

Trustee, Conseil scolaire catholique MonAvenir

- Genevieve Grenier
- Blaise Liaki
