= Linda Jeffrey =

Canadian politician

The Honourable Linda Jeffery ECO
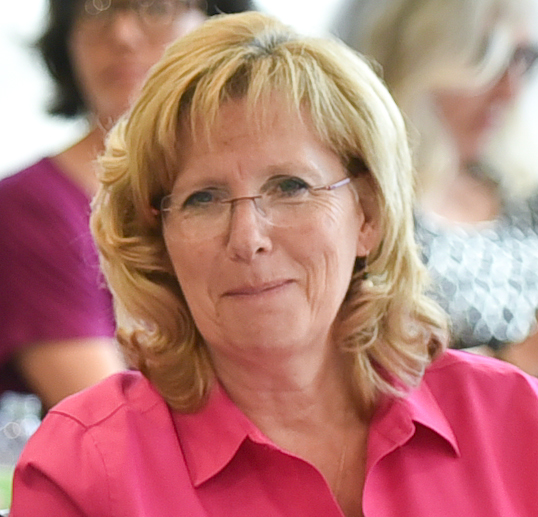
- Jeffery in 2017

50th Mayor of Brampton
- In office December 1, 2014 – December 1, 2018
- Preceded by: Susan Fennell
- Succeeded by: Patrick Brown

Member of the Ontario Provincial Parliament
- In office 2007–2014
- Preceded by: New riding
- Succeeded by: Harinder Malhi
- Constituency: Brampton-Springdale
- In office 2003–2007
- Preceded by: Joe Spina
- Succeeded by: Riding abolished
- Constituency: Brampton Centre

Personal details
- Born: 1958 (age 67–68) Cork, Ireland
- Party: Independent (since 2014)
- Other political affiliations: Progressive Conservative (2002-2003); Liberal (2003-2014)
- Spouse: John Jeffrey
- Children: 3

Linda Jeffrey (born c. 1958 née Linda Rooney) is a politician in Ontario, Canada. From 2003 to 2014 she was a Liberal member of the Legislative Assembly of Ontario who represented the ridings of Brampton Centre and then Brampton—Springdale. She served as a cabinet minister in the governments of Dalton McGuinty and Kathleen Wynne. On March 25, 2014, she resigned from the legislature to run for Mayor of Brampton, and was elected on October 27, 2014. On 22 October 2018, Jeffrey was narrowly defeated in the mayoral race by former Ontario Progressive Conservative leader Patrick Brown.

== Background ==
Jeffrey was born in Cork, Ireland, and moved to Canada with her parents in 1961 and to Brampton in 1983. She and her husband, John Jeffrey, have three sons, Derek, Kevin, and Ryan.

== Political career ==
=== City Councillor ===
Jeffrey was elected as a city councillor for Brampton's Ward 2 in 1991, and helped to negotiate the sale of Brampton Hydro toward the end of the decade (in addition to representing Brampton on the provincial Hydro One Board of Directors). Jeffrey also chaired the city's Budget Committee, and increased public access to the city's budget review process during her time as a councillor. She served as Acting Mayor of Brampton in May 2001, making at least one official appearance with the title.

=== Provincial politics ===
During the Progressive Conservatives Party of Ontario 2002 leadership contest, Jeffrey was approached to be the returning officer in Brampton as the party wanted someone who would be independent. In order to be a returning officer, she had to be a member of the party so she joined the PC party in 2002.

Jeffrey joined the Ontario Liberal Party in 2003 after being recruited by Greg Sorbara to run in the provincial election of 2003. She defeated incumbent Progressive Conservative Joe Spina by 1,005 votes in Brampton Centre. The Liberals won the election and she initially served as a backbench supporter of Premier Dalton McGuinty. She was re-elected in the redistributed riding of Brampton-Springdale in 2007 and 2011.

Between 2005 and 2010 she served in a variety of positions including Parliamentary Assistant to the Ministers of Children and Youth Services, Democratic Renewal, Intergovernmental Affairs, Citizenship and Immigration and Transportation.

On January 18, 2010, Premier Dalton McGuinty appointed her to cabinet as Minister of Natural Resources. On October 10, 2011, she was appointed Minister of Labour and Minister Responsible for Seniors.

During the 2013 Ontario Liberal Party leadership contest, Jeffrey was the first cabinet minister and one of four sitting MPPs (along with Reza Moridi, Mario Sergio, and David Zimmer) that endorsed Kathleen Wynne's candidacy at Wynne's campaign launch. On February 11, 2013, Wynne appointed her Minister of Municipal Affairs and Housing and Chair of Cabinet.

=== Cabinet positions ===
Wynne ministry, Province of Ontario (2013–2018)
Cabinet posts (2)
Predecessor	Office	Successor
Rick Bartolucci	Chair of Cabinet; 2013–2014	John Gerretsen
Bob Chiarelli	Minister of Municipal Affairs and Housing; 2013–2014	Bill Mauro
McGuinty ministry, Province of Ontario (2003–2013)
Cabinet posts (2)
Predecessor	Office	Successor
Charles Sousa	Minister of Labour; 2011–2013; Also Responsible for Seniors	Yasir Naqvi
Donna Cansfield	Minister of Natural Resources; 2010–2011	Michael Gravelle

=== Mayor of Brampton ===
After incumbent Brampton mayor Susan Fennell was embroiled in numerous scandals over expenses and financial record-keeping, former Ontario Premier Bill Davis reportedly convinced Jeffrey to resign from provincial cabinet to challenge Fennell.

On March 25, 2014, Jeffrey resigned from the legislature to run for Mayor of Brampton in the 2014 municipal election. As of September 30, 2014 she was polling well ahead of the incumbent Susan Fennell. She won the mayoral election defeating Susan Fennell with 49.33% of the vote.

After taking office as mayor, Jeffrey appointed former Premier Davis to a panel tasked with bringing a university to Brampton. However, Davis and Jeffrey had a falling out over Peel Region's proposed Light Rail Transit line, as Jeffrey supported its extension from Hurontario Street in Mississauga further north along Main Street in Brampton (where it would run by Davis' house), while Davis preferred an alternative alignment along Queen Street.

Jeffrey's 2018 re-election campaign saw Jeffrey run against former Ontario Progressive Conservative Party leader Patrick Brown and former Conservative federal minister Bal Gosal, among others. Former Premier Davis had switched his support to Brown over the Light Rail Transit issue. Despite that, and her background as a Liberal, Jeffrey held a fundraiser at the Conservative Party-associated venue the Albany Club of Toronto, accepting endorsements from former Ontario Progressive Conservative Party presidents Richard Ciano and Ken Zeise, as well as Michael Diamond, Premier Doug Ford's leadership campaign manager. According to the Toronto Star, Jeffrey had the backing of "PC party operatives — Doug Ford’s campaign manager organized a fundraiser for her".

Jeffery lost her re-election bid to Patrick Brown by a narrow margin in the 2018 Peel Region municipal elections. In a speech to supporters, Jeffrey said that during her tenure as mayor, "we brought in accountability, openness and transparency to city hall. I can confidently say our city is in better shape than what I found it”.

== Election results ==
=== Mayor of Brampton ===
Mayoral Candidate	Vote	%
Patrick Brown	46,894	44.43
Linda Jeffrey (X)	42,993	40.73
Baljit Gosal	5,319	5.04
John Sprovieri	5,028	4.76
Wesley Jackson	2,442	2.31
Vinod Kumar Mahesan	1,905	1.80
Mansoor Ameersulthan	972	0.92

Candidate	Vote	%
Linda Jeffrey	51,061	49.33
John Sanderson	22,336	21.58
Susan Fennell (X)	12,975	12.54
Gurjit S. Grewal	3,464	3.35
Donald McLeod	2,782	2.69
Jacqueline Bell	2,187	2.11
Ranjit Singh	2,085	2.01
Muhammad Haque	1,848	1.79
Baljit Bobby More	1,304	1.26
Sukhjinder S. Gill	878	0.85
Hargurnar Randhawa	749	0.72
Devinder Sangha	731	0.71
Miriam Wylie	473	0.46

=== Brampton—Springdale ===
2011 Ontario general election: Brampton—Springdale
Party	Candidate	Votes	%	±%
Liberal	Linda Jeffrey	15,663	44.43	–6.24
Progressive Conservative	Pam Hundal	12,754	36.17	+5.48
New Democratic	Mani Singh	5,378	15.25	+4.36
Green	James Duncan	900	2.55	–4.02
Family Coalition	Bart Wysokinski	193	0.55	–0.19
Communist	Elizabeth Rowley	152	0.43	–0.00
Paramount Canadians	Jasbir Singh	136	0.39	–
Confederation of Regions	Fauzia Sadiq	81	0.23	–
Total valid votes		35,257	99.33	
Total rejected, unmarked and declined ballots		237	0.67	–0.45
Turnout		35,494	40.54	–2.91
Eligible voters		87,543		
Liberal hold		Swing		–5.86
Source: Elections Ontario

2007 Ontario general election: Brampton—Springdale
Party	Candidate	Votes	%
Liberal	Linda Jeffrey	17,673	50.66
Progressive Conservative	Carman McClelland	10,708	30.70
New Democratic	Mani Singh	3,800	10.89
Green	Daniel Cullen	2,292	6.57
Family Coalition	Sandy Toteda	258	0.74
Communist	Elizabeth Rowley	152	0.44
Total valid votes		34,883	98.88
Total rejected, unmarked and declined ballots		395	1.12
Turnout		35,278	43.45
Eligible voters		81,190	
Liberal pickup new district.			
Source: Elections Ontario

=== Brampton Centre ===
2003 Ontario general election
Party	Candidate	Votes	%	±%
Liberal	Linda Jeffrey	16,661	43.48	+15.48
Progressive Conservative	Joe Spina	15,656	40.86	-16.91
New Democratic	Kathy Pounder	4,827	12.60	-1.63
Green	Sanjeev Goel	820	2.14	
Freedom	Wally Dove	356	0.93	
