= Carman McClelland =

Canadian politician (1951–2022)

Ontario MPP
- In office 1987–1995
- Preceded by: New riding
- Succeeded by: Joe Spina
- Constituency: Brampton North

Personal details
- Born: September 22, 1951 Portuguese Angola
- Died: June 1, 2022 (aged 70) Brampton, Ontario, Canada
- Party: Liberal (1987–1995); Progressive Conservative (2007–2022)
- Occupation: Lawyer

John Carman McClelland (September 22, 1951 – June 1, 2022) was a Canadian politician in Ontario. He was a Liberal member of the Legislative Assembly of Ontario from 1987 to 1995 who represented the riding of Brampton North. He was subsequently an unsuccessful Progressive Conservative candidate in the 2007 provincial election.

In July 2018, he announced candidacy for Ward 1 & 5 Regional councillor from Brampton in the 2018 municipal election.

== Background ==
McClelland was born in Angola and moved to Canada at a young age, where he received a Bachelor of Arts degree from York University and a law degree from the University of Windsor. After graduation, he practiced law as an associate at the firm of Fogler, Rubinoff, Toronto. He was also a board member of the Canadian Council of Christian Charities.

== Politics ==
McClelland ran for the Ontario legislature in the general election of 1977, losing to New Democrat (NDP) Ted Bounsall by over 3,500 votes in Windsor—Sandwich. The next year, McClelland narrowly lost the race for a seat on the Windsor Board of Education representing Ward 1. In 1980, he was appointed a board member for Ward 1 after the death of trustee Donald Hill, but was again narrowly defeated in the general election that November. He did not seek office again until the 1987 provincial election, when he was easily elected in Brampton North as part of a Liberal landslide victory. McClelland served as a backbench supporter of David Peterson's government for the next three years.

Prior to the 1990 election, McClelland was challenged for the Liberal nomination in his riding by the representative of a group which claimed the Peterson government had made insufficient outreach efforts to Ontario's Sikh community. He won the nomination challenge, and went on to defeat NDP challenger John Devries by only 98 votes in the general election. The Liberals were upset by the NDP provincially, and McClelland moved to the opposition benches for the next five years. In 1993, he brought forward a private member's bill dealing with the possibility of electoral recall.

The Progressive Conservatives won a majority government in the 1995 Ontario election, and McClelland lost to PC candidate Joe Spina by 5,348 votes.

In 2007, McClelland changed parties and was the PC candidate for the riding of Brampton—Springdale in the 2007 Ontario election, but lost to the Liberal candidate Linda Jeffrey by nearly 7,000 votes.

== Return to legal practice ==
In 1995, he resumed his legal practice and was a member and VP of the Peel Law Association Executive Committee. He has also been President (2008–2009) of the Brampton Board of Trade. In May 2015, the Law Society of Upper Canada suspended McClelland for mishandling the finances of several clients including some family members.
