= Graham McGregor (politician) =

Canadian politician

The Honourable Graham McGregor ECO MPP
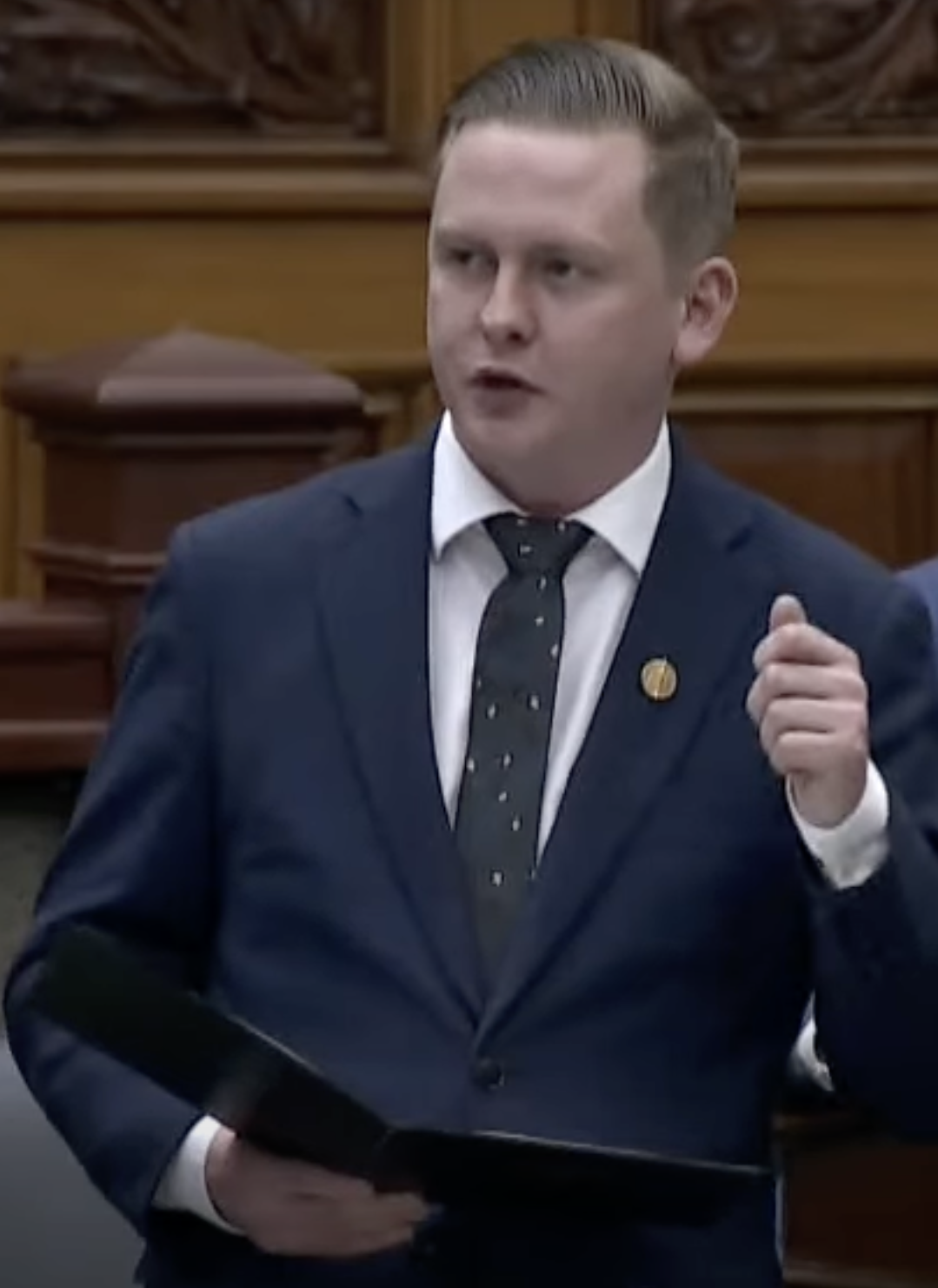
- McGregor in 2023

Minister of Citizenship and Multiculturalism
- Incumbent
- Assumed office March 19, 2025
- Premier: Doug Ford
- Preceded by: Michael Ford

Associate Minister of Auto Theft and Bail Reform
- In office June 2, 2022 – March 19, 2025
- Premier: Doug Ford
- Preceded by: Position established
- Succeeded by: Zee Hamid

Member of the Ontario Provincial Parliament for Brampton North
- Incumbent
- Assumed office June 2, 2022
- Preceded by: Kevin Yarde

Personal details
- Born: Graham James McGregor; May 26, 1993 (age 32) Brampton, Ontario, Canada
- Party: Progressive Conservative
- Profession: Operations Director

Graham James McGregor ECO MPP is a Canadian politician who was elected to the Legislative Assembly of Ontario in the 2022 provincial election. He represents the riding of Brampton North as a member of the Progressive Conservative Party of Ontario. He was named to the Ontario cabinet as Associate Minister of Auto Theft and Bail Reform on August 16, 2024. After the 2025 election, he was named Ontario's Minister of Citizenship and Multiculturalism on March 19, 2025.

== Electoral history ==
2025 Ontario general election: Brampton North
Party	Candidate	Votes	%	±%
Progressive Conservative	Graham McGregor	17,597	57.52	+12.53
Liberal	Ranjit Singh Bagga	9,270	30.30	+1.53
New Democratic	Ruby Zaman	2,479	8.10	–11.71
Green	Sameera Falcon Khan	746	2.44	–0.54
New Blue	Melanie Porte	499	1.63	–0.40
Total valid votes/expense limit		30,591	99.47	+0.14
Total rejected, unmarked, and declined ballots		163	0.53	–0.14
Turnout		30,754	38.76	+0.30
Eligible voters		79,342		
Progressive Conservative hold		Swing		+5.50
Source: Elections Ontario

2022 Ontario general election: Brampton North
Party	Candidate	Votes	%	±%	Expenditures
Progressive Conservative	Graham McGregor	13,509	44.99	+8.70	$71,616
Liberal	Harinder K Malhi	8,639	28.77	+7.55	$51,025
New Democratic	Sandeep Singh	5,949	19.81	-17.73	$93,448
Green	Aneep Dhade	895	2.98	-0.47	$1,807
New Blue	Jerry Fussek	610	2.03	-	$2,291
Ontario Party	Julia Bauman	423	1.41	-	$0
Total valid votes		30,025	99.33	+0.35	$110,020
Total rejected, unmarked, and declined ballots		203	0.67	-0.35	
Turnout		30,228	38.46		
Eligible voters		78,501			
Progressive Conservative gain from Independent		Swing		+0.58	
Source(s): "Summary of Valid Votes Cast for Each Candidate" (PDF). Elections Ontario. 2022. Archived from the original on May 18, 2023.; "Statistical Summary by Electoral District" (PDF). Elections Ontario. 2022. Archived from the original on May 21, 2023.
