= Charmaine Williams =

Canadian politician

The Honourable Charmaine Williams ECO MPP
- Williams in 2024

Associate Minister of Women's Social and Economic Opportunity of Ontario
- Incumbent
- Assumed office June 24, 2022
- Premier: Doug Ford
- Preceded by: Jill Dunlop

Member of the Ontario Provincial Parliament for Brampton Centre
- Incumbent
- Assumed office June 2, 2022
- Preceded by: Sara Singh

Personal details
- Party: Progressive Conservative
- Website: charmainewilliamsmpp.ca

Charmaine Williams ECO MPP is a Canadian politician currently serving as Associate Minister of Women's Social and Economic Opportunity. She was elected to the Legislative Assembly of Ontario in the 2022 provincial election, representing the riding of Brampton Centre as a member of the Progressive Conservative Party of Ontario.

== Municipal politics ==
Williams ran for the vacant Ward 7 & 8 city council seat in the 2018 municipal election. During the campaign, Williams supported a gun amnesty buyback program and supported a municipal by-law banning the sale of marijuana within 500 meters of schools.

On October 22, 2018, Williams was elected receiving 25.76% of the vote in a 9 person race. With her victory, Williams became the first black woman ever elected to Brampton City Council.

On May 31, 2022, during the Ontario provincial election in which Williams was a candidate, Brampton City Council passed a motion to pre-emptively appoint former city councillor Elaine Moore as William's replacement if she were to resign. The motion passed 6–5 with Williams being one of the 6 votes in favor. A court later ruled that the pre-emptive appointment violated the Municipal Act.

== Provincial politics ==
On March 31, 2021, Williams was named Ontario PC candidate for the Brampton Centre riding. On June 2, 2022, she defeated NDP incumbent Sara Singh, receiving 41.36% of the vote.

On June 24, she was appointed to the Ford Ministry as Associate Minister of Women's Social and Economic Opportunity., making her the first black person appointed to cabinet in an Ontario PC government.

== Electoral record ==
2025 Ontario general election: Brampton Centre
Party	Candidate	Votes	%	±%
Progressive Conservative	Charmaine Williams	12,776	51.85	+10.49
Liberal	Martin Medeiros	8,357	33.92	+8.91
New Democratic	Sukhamrit Singh	2,161	8.77	–17.89
Green	Pauline Thornham	910	3.69	+0.09
New Blue	Kamal Preet Kaur	434	1.76	–1.59
Total valid votes		24,638	99.39	
Total rejected, unmarked and declined ballots		151	0.61	+0.04
Turnout		24,789	36.71	+0.04
Eligible voters		67,525		
Progressive Conservative hold		Swing		+9.70
Source: Elections Ontario

2022 Ontario general election: Brampton Centre
Party	Candidate	Votes	%	±%	Expenditures
Progressive Conservative	Charmaine Williams	10,119	41.36	+3.26	$71,062
New Democratic	Sara Singh	6,522	26.66	–11.71	$68,178
Liberal	Safdar Hussain	6,119	25.01	+7.68	$34,979
Green	Karitsa Tye	882	3.61	+0.47	$344
New Blue	Kathrin Matusiak	821	3.36	–	$3,010
Total valid votes/expense limit		24,463	99.44	–	$93,930
Total rejected, unmarked and declined ballots		139	0.57	–0.47	
Turnout		24,602	36.67	–13.68	
Eligible voters		67,093			
Progressive Conservative gain from New Democratic		Swing		▲7.48	
Source: Elections Ontario

2018 Brampton Municipal Election: Ward 7 & 8
Candidate	Vote	%
Charmaine Williams	5,086	25.76
Martin Singh	4,403	22.30
Karla Bailey	3,489	17.67
Harveen Dhaliwal	3,364	17.04
Cheryl Rodricks	1,003	5.08
Drew Riedstra	824	4.17
Gurvinder Singh	712	3.61
Sam Kunjicka	512	2.59
Mokshi Virk	348	1.76
