= Harinder Malhi =

Canadian politician

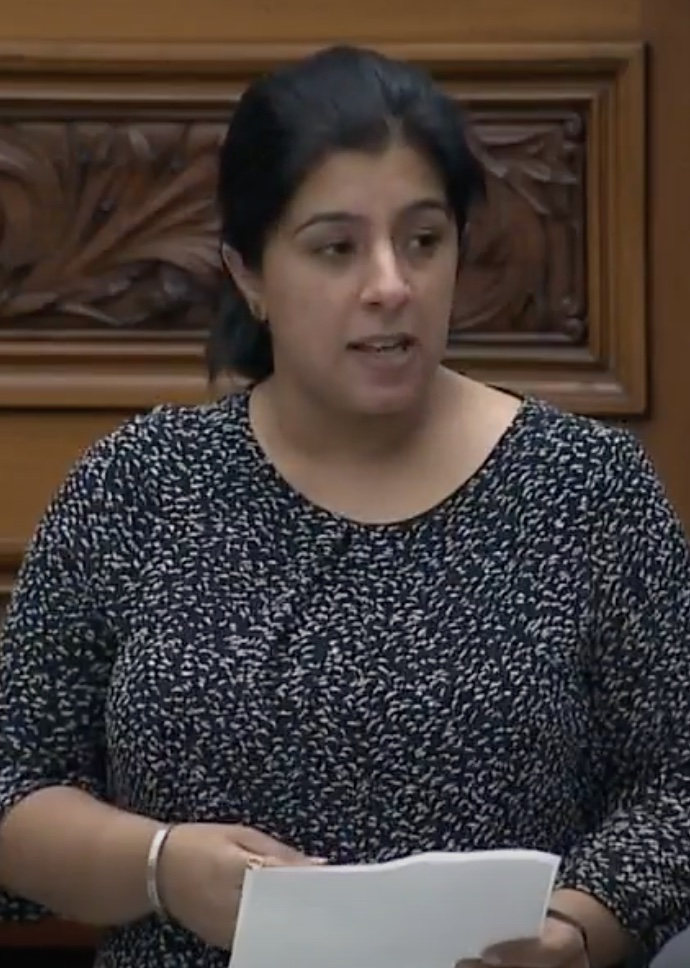

Member of the Ontario Provincial Parliament for Brampton—Springdale
- In office June 12, 2014 – June 7, 2018
- Preceded by: Linda Jeffrey
- Succeeded by: Kevin Yarde (Brampton North)

Peel District School Board Trustee
- In office 2010–2014
- Constituency: Brampton Wards 9 and 10

Personal details
- Born: 1981 (age 44–45)
- Party: Liberal
- Education: Ryerson University
- Occupation: Real estate agent

Harinder Kaur Malhi (born c. 1981) is a former Canadian politician in Ontario, Canada. She was a Liberal member of the Legislative Assembly of Ontario from 2014 to 2018 who represented the riding of Brampton—Springdale, and was a member of the Ontario provincial cabinet in the government of Kathleen Wynne.

== Background ==
Malhi's family is of Indian descent, and she speaks Punjabi. Her father, Gurbax Singh Malhi, was a Liberal federal Member of Parliament between 1993 and 2011, representing the riding of Bramalea—Gore—Malton. Her mother is Devinder Malhi.

Malhi studied at Ryerson University, where she obtained a degree in public administration and governance. She worked as a sales agent at a telecommunications company in Brampton, and then as a real estate agent.

== Politics ==
On 25 October 2010, she was elected as a school trustee for the Peel District School Board, representing Brampton wards 9 and 10, during the 2010 municipal election.

Malhi was selected as the Liberal candidate for the Brampton-Springdale riding after incumbent cabinet minister Linda Jeffrey vacated the seat in March 2014 to run for the mayor of Brampton. She was elected MPP in the 2014 election and took an unpaid leave of absence from her position as school trustee, during the campaign.

She served as Parliamentary Assistant to the Minister of Tourism, Culture and Sport (2016–18), and as Parliamentary Assistant to the Minister Responsible for Women's Issues (2014–16). In January 2018, she was promoted to cabinet as Minister of the Status of Women by Premier Kathleen Wynne.

In the 2018 provincial election she ran in the new riding of Brampton North, placing third, losing the seat to Kevin Yarde of the NDP. In the 2022 provincial election, she contested Brampton North once again, coming in second place, but this time losing to the Progressive Conservative candidate Graham McGregor.

=== Cabinet positions ===
Wynne ministry, Province of Ontario (2013–2018)
Cabinet post (1)
Predecessor	Office	Successor
Indira Naidoo-Harris	Minister of the Status of Women; 2018 (January - June)	Lisa MacLeod

== Elections ==
2022 Ontario general election: Brampton North
Party	Candidate	Votes	%	±%	Expenditures
Progressive Conservative	Graham McGregor	13,509	44.99	+8.70	$71,616
Liberal	Harinder Malhi	8,639	28.77	+7.55	$51,025
New Democratic	Sandeep Singh	5,949	19.81	–17.73	$93,448
Green	Aneep Dhade	895	2.98	–0.47	$1,807
New Blue	Jerry Fussek	610	2.03	–	$2,291
Ontario Party	Julia Bauman	423	1.41	–	$0
Total valid votes/expense limit		30,025	99.33	–	$110,020
Total rejected, unmarked and declined ballots		203	0.67	–0.35	
Turnout		30,228	38.46	–13.12	
Eligible voters		78,586			
Progressive Conservative gain from New Democratic		Swing		+0.58	
Source: Elections Ontario

2018 Ontario general election: Brampton North
Party	Candidate	Votes	%	±%
New Democratic	Kevin Yarde	14,877	37.55	+6.24
Progressive Conservative	Ripudaman Dhillon	14,380	36.29	+11.85
Liberal	Harinder Malhi	8,410	21.22	–18.70
Green	Pauline Thornham	1,366	3.45	+0.04
Libertarian	Gregory Argue	591	1.49	–
Total valid votes		39,624	98.98	
Total rejected, unmarked and declined ballots		407	1.02	
Turnout		40,031	51.58	
Eligible voters		77,609		
New Democratic notional gain from Liberal		Swing		+12.47
Source: Elections Ontario

2014 Ontario general election
Party	Candidate	Votes	%	±%
Liberal	Harinder Malhi	16,848	39.8	
New Democratic	Gurpreet Dhillon	13,481	31.9	
Progressive Conservative	Pam Hundal	10,234	24.2	
Green	Laila Zarrabi Yan	1,322	3.1	
Communist	Elizabeth Hill	398	0.9	
Source: Elections Ontario

Peel District School Board, Wards 9 & 10
Candidate	Votes	%
Harinder Malhi	9019	46.82%
Joy Adams	3242	16.83%
Jash Puniya	2453	12.73%
Mohan Singh Khangura	1838	9.54%
John Crowley	1633	8.48%
Devinder Jeet Singh	447	2.32%
Fatima Devonish	439	2.28%
Yadwinder Sahota	191	0.99%
