= Joe Spina =

Canadian politician

Member of the Ontario Legislative Assembly for Brampton Centre Brampton North (1995-1999)
- In office 1995–2003
- Preceded by: Carman McClelland
- Succeeded by: Linda Jeffrey

Personal details
- Born: 21 September 1946 (age 79) Sault Ste. Marie, Ontario
- Party: Progressive Conservative
- Occupation: Business Owner

Joe Spina (born September 21, 1946) is a former politician in Ontario, Canada. He was a member of the Legislative Assembly of Ontario from 1995 to 2003, representing a Brampton-area riding for the Progressive Conservative Party.

== Background ==
Spina was educated at the University of Windsor, receiving a Bachelor of Commerce degree in 1975. He was the owner and president of Amplexus Communications from 1981 to 1995 and served as president of the Brampton Board of Trade in 1989–90. He was also a founding chair of the Brampton and Vaughan Santa Claus Parades.

== Politics ==
Spina was elected to the Ontario legislature in the provincial election of 1995, defeating incumbent Liberal Carman McClelland by just over 5,000 votes in the riding of Brampton North. This riding is located in "905 belt", a suburban region which provided the Ontario Tories with their strongest support base in this period.

On two occasions during his first term in office, Spina attracted controversy for making inflammatory comments while heckling opposition members speaking in the legislature. On November 6, 1996, while Marilyn Churley was speaking about the government's handling of a proposed new school breakfast program, Spina yelled "Why don't you go home and take care of your own kids?", and on November 18, 1996, he yelled at Gilles Bisson to "Speak English!" while Bisson was making a speech in French to mark the tenth anniversary of Ontario's French Language Services Act.

He increased his margin of victory in the 1999 provincial election in the redistributed riding of Brampton Centre, defeating Liberal candidate Gurjit Grewal by over 10,000 votes. In 2000, he supported Stockwell Day's bid to lead the Canadian Alliance on the second ballot of the new federal party's leadership vote. Spina served as a backbench supporter in the governments of Mike Harris and Ernie Eves. He served as parliamentary assistant to six cabinet ministers. In 2001, he introduced a private member's bill attempting to increase public awareness of congenital heart defects. He supported Tony Clement, then Jim Flaherty for the party's leadership in 2002.

In the 2003 provincial election, he was defeated by Liberal candidate Linda Jeffrey by 1,005 votes.

In the Canadian federal election of 2004, Spina ran for the Conservative Party of Canada in the riding of Vaughan against high-profile Liberal incumbent Maurizio Bevilacqua. He was defeated, losing to Bevilacqua by almost 20,000 votes.
