= Brampton—Springdale (provincial electoral district) =

Coordinates: 43.71°N 79.74°W

Ontario electoral district
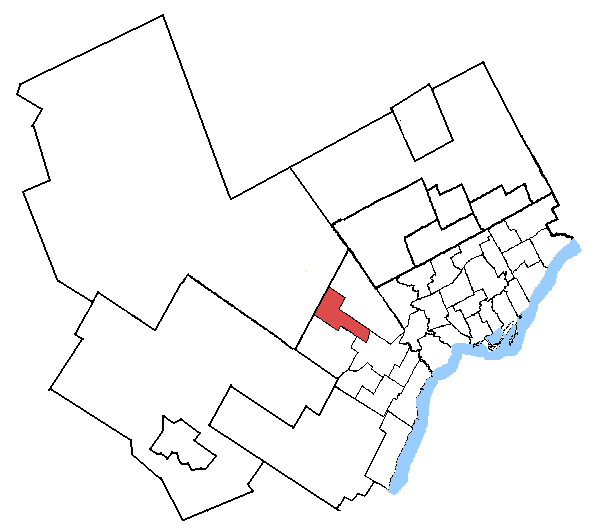
- Brampton—Springdale in relation to other Greater Toronto Area electoral districts

Defunct provincial electoral district
- Legislature: Legislative Assembly of Ontario
- District created: 2004
- District abolished: 2015
- First contested: 2007
- Last contested: 2014

Demographics
- Population (2006): 131,797
- Electors (2007): 80,170
- Area (km²): 59
- Census division: Peel
- Census subdivision: Brampton

Brampton—Springdale was a provincial electoral district in central Ontario, Canada. It was created for the 2007 provincial election. 83.7% of the district was created from Brampton Centre while 16.3% was carved from Bramalea—Gore—Malton—Springdale.

The riding includes that part of Brampton west of a line following Dixie Road to Bovaird Drive to Torbram Road and east of a line following Hurontario Street to Vodden Street to Kennedy Road.

In 2018, the district was dissolved into Brampton Centre, Brampton North and Brampton East.

== Members of Provincial Parliament ==
Brampton—Springdale
Assembly	Years	Member	Party
Riding created from Brampton Centre and Bramalea—Gore—Malton—Springdale
39th	2007–2011	Linda Jeffrey	Liberal
40th	2011–2014	Linda Jeffrey	Liberal
41st	2014–2018	Harinder Malhi	Liberal
Riding dissolved into Brampton Centre, Brampton North, and Brampton East

== Election results ==
2014 Ontario general election
Party	Candidate	Votes	%	±%
Liberal	Harinder Malhi	16,927	40.06	–4.36
New Democratic	Gurpreet Dhillon	13,513	31.98	+16.73
Progressive Conservative	Pam Hundal	10,117	23.95	–12.23
Green	Laila Zarrabi Yan	1,311	3.10	+0.55
Communist	Elizabeth Hill	382	0.90	+0.47
Total valid votes		42,250	98.68	
Total rejected, unmarked and declined ballots		566	1.32	+0.65
Turnout		42,816	45.34	+4.80
Eligible voters		94,424		
Liberal hold		Swing		–10.55
Source: Elections Ontario

2011 Ontario general election
Party	Candidate	Votes	%	±%
Liberal	Linda Jeffrey	15,663	44.43	–6.24
Progressive Conservative	Pam Hundal	12,754	36.17	+5.48
New Democratic	Mani Singh	5,378	15.25	+4.36
Green	James Duncan	900	2.55	–4.02
Family Coalition	Bart Wysokinski	193	0.55	–0.19
Communist	Elizabeth Rowley	152	0.43	–0.00
Paramount Canadians	Jasbir Singh	136	0.39	–
Confederation of Regions	Fauzia Sadiq	81	0.23	–
Total valid votes		35,257	99.33	
Total rejected, unmarked and declined ballots		237	0.67	–0.45
Turnout		35,494	40.54	–2.91
Eligible voters		87,543		
Liberal hold		Swing		–5.86
Source: Elections Ontario

2007 Ontario general election
Party	Candidate	Votes	%
Liberal	Linda Jeffrey	17,673	50.66
Progressive Conservative	Carman McClelland	10,708	30.70
New Democratic	Mani Singh	3,800	10.89
Green	Daniel Cullen	2,292	6.57
Family Coalition	Sandy Toteda	258	0.74
Communist	Elizabeth Rowley	152	0.44
Total valid votes		34,883	98.88
Total rejected, unmarked and declined ballots		395	1.12
Turnout		35,278	43.45
Eligible voters		81,190	
Liberal pickup new district.			
Source: Elections Ontario

== 2007 electoral reform referendum ==
2007 Ontario electoral reform referendum
Side	Votes	%
First Past the Post	20,409	60.1
Mixed member proportional	13,537	39.9
Total valid votes	33,946	100.0

== Sources ==
- Elections Ontario Past Election Results
