= Kevin Yarde =

Canadian politician and television meteorologist

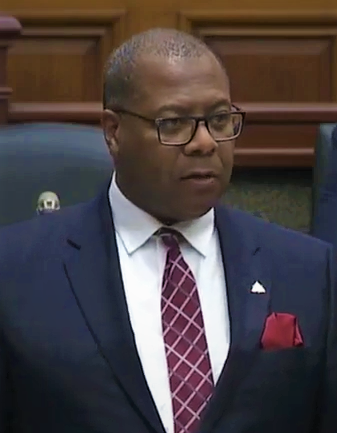
- Yarde in 2019

Member of the Ontario Provincial Parliament for Brampton North
- In office June 7, 2018 – May 3, 2022
- Preceded by: Riding established
- Succeeded by: Graham McGregor

Personal details
- Born: Toronto, Ontario, Canada
- Party: Independent
- Other political affiliations: New Democratic (2018–2022)
- Education: York University; Ryerson University
- Occupation: Weather presenter
- Website: kevinyarde.ontariondp.ca

Kevin Yarde is a former Canadian politician and former weather presenter who was elected to the Legislative Assembly of Ontario in the 2018 provincial election for the riding of Brampton North. Initially elected as a member of the Ontario New Democratic Party, he eventually left the party to sit as an independent.

He is part of Ontario's first ever black caucus, alongside NDP caucus colleagues Laura Mae Lindo, Faisal Hassan, Jill Andrew and Rima Berns-McGown.

While serving as a Member of Provincial Parliament, Yarde was employed by private security firms Sentinel Security and Nationwide Security Ltd.

Yarde did not receive his party's nomination as a candidate in the 2022 election, losing to Sandeep Singh, who unsuccessfully ran in Caledon Ward 2 in the 2018 municipal elections. Yarde was the only NDP incumbent MPP to not receive his party nomination. Subsequently, Yarde resigned from the NDP to sit as an independent MPP for the remainder of the 42nd Parliament of Ontario.

Prior to his election to the legislature, Yarde worked for The Weather Network.

== Personal life and education ==
Yarde was born in Toronto and has never lived in Brampton, but has "longtime family roots in Brampton". His ancestors emigrated to Canada from the United States (Virginia), Barbados and Saint Kitts and Nevis (Saint Kitts). He studied journalism at York University and Ryerson University, before beginning his television career on the Rogers TV community television network. He joined The Weather Network in 2001, first as a field correspondent and later as a studio host. Yarde is a member of the US-based National Association of Black Journalists and also a volunteer with the Toronto location of Covenant House, a shelter and support centre for homeless and at-risk youth.

He is a first cousin of drummer Tyler Stewart of the Barenaked Ladies.

== Electoral record ==
2018 Ontario general election: Brampton North
Party	Candidate	Votes	%	±%
New Democratic	Kevin Yarde	14,877	37.55	+6.24
Progressive Conservative	Ripudaman Dhillon	14,380	36.29	+11.85
Liberal	Harinder Malhi	8,410	21.22	–18.70
Green	Pauline Thornham	1,366	3.45	+0.04
Libertarian	Gregory Argue	591	1.49	–
Total valid votes		39,624	98.98	
Total rejected, unmarked and declined ballots		407	1.02	
Turnout		40,031	51.58	
Eligible voters		77,609		
New Democratic notional gain from Liberal		Swing		+12.47
Source: Elections Ontario
