= Paramount Canadians Party =

- Active provincial party
- Leader: Ranvir Dogra
- President: Sardar Talukdar
- Founded: 2011
- Dissolved: 2014
- Headquarters: 12 Gristone Crst. Toronto, Ontario; M1X 1V1
- Ideology: Populism
- Seats in Legislature: 0 / 107

The Paramount Canadians Party was a political party in the Canadian province of Ontario founded in 2011.

== Platform ==
- To reduce auto insurance & come to the level of Quebec.
- To cap all future insurances premium increase.
- To make the federal government agree to provide gas at low prices.
- To set up a gas refinery in Ontario under public-private partnership.
- To make foreign qualifications from universities of repute acceptable without recourse to long process of accreditation.
- To create an appropriate environment to youth to prevent involvement in gangs and drugs etc.
- To encourage and strengthen nuclear families.
- To rationalize welfare system and also make immigration responsible to provincial needs.
- To ensure the seniors lead happy and self reliable life.

== Candidates ==
In the 2011 Ontario general election, the Paramount Canadians Party fielded four candidates for the Legislative Assembly of Ontario

Riding	Candidate's Name	Notes	Gender	Residence	Occupation	Votes	%	Rank
Scarborough—Agincourt	Priya Ahuja		F			209	0.6%	6th of 7
Mississauga East—Cooksville	Shriya Shah-Klorfine	Shriya was born in Nepal and resided in Toronto. She died on May 19, 2012, while descending from Mount Everest.	F			117	0.3%	7th of 7
Etobicoke North	Gopal Baghel		M			100	0.4%	7th of 7
Brampton—Springdale	Jasbir Singh		M			136	0.4%	7th of 8
