= Brampton Centre (provincial electoral district) =

Provincial electoral district in Ontario, Canada

Coordinates: 43.705°N 79.730°W

Ontario electoral district
- Location in Brampton

Provincial electoral district
- Legislature: Legislative Assembly of Ontario
MPP
Charmaine Williams
Progressive Conservative
- District created: 2015
- First contested: 2018
- Last contested: 2025

Demographics
- Population (2016): 102,275
- Electors (2018): 67,432
- Area (km²): 44
- Pop. density (per km²): 2,324.4
- Census division: Peel
- Census subdivision: Brampton

Brampton Centre is a provincial electoral district in central Ontario, Canada, that elects one Member of the Legislative Assembly of Ontario. It was originally created in 1999 from Brampton North and Brampton South. It was abolished in 2007 into Brampton West and Brampton—Springdale. For the 2018 election, it was re-created from Bramalea—Gore—Malton, Brampton—Springdale, and Mississauga—Brampton South.

The former riding included Brampton west of Dixie Road and east of a line following McLaughlin Road to Bovaird Drive to Main Street to Steeles Avenue to Kennedy Road.

== Members of Provincial Parliament ==
Brampton Centre
Assembly	Years	Member	Party
37th	1999–2003	Joe Spina	Progressive Conservative
38th	2003–2007	Linda Jeffrey	Liberal
Riding dissolved into Brampton West and Brampton—Springdale
Riding re-created from Bramalea—Gore—Malton, Brampton—Springdale and Mississauga—Brampton South
42nd	2018–2022	Sara Singh	New Democratic
43rd	2022–present	Charmaine Williams	Progressive Conservative

== Election results ==
=== 2018–present ===
Winning party in each polling division of Brampton Centre at the 2025 Ontario general election

2025 Ontario general election
Party	Candidate	Votes	%	±%
Progressive Conservative	Charmaine Williams	12,776	51.85	+10.49
Liberal	Martin Medeiros	8,357	33.92	+8.91
New Democratic	Sukhamrit Singh	2,161	8.77	–17.89
Green	Pauline Thornham	910	3.69	+0.09
New Blue	Kamal Preet Kaur	434	1.76	–1.59
Total valid votes		24,638	99.39	
Total rejected, unmarked and declined ballots		151	0.61	+0.04
Turnout		24,789	36.71	+0.04
Eligible voters		67,525		
Progressive Conservative hold		Swing		+0.79
Source: Elections Ontario

Winning party in each polling division of Brampton Centre at the 2022 Ontario general election

2022 Ontario general election
Party	Candidate	Votes	%	±%	Expenditures
Progressive Conservative	Charmaine Williams	10,119	41.36	+3.26	$71,062
New Democratic	Sara Singh	6,522	26.66	–11.71	$68,178
Liberal	Safdar Hussain	6,119	25.01	+7.68	$34,979
Green	Karitsa Tye	882	3.61	+0.47	$344
New Blue	Kathrin Matusiak	821	3.36	–	$3,010
Total valid votes/expense limit		24,463	99.44	–	$93,930
Total rejected, unmarked and declined ballots		139	0.57	–0.47	
Turnout		24,602	36.67	–13.68	
Eligible voters		67,093			
Progressive Conservative gain from New Democratic		Swing		▲7.48	
Source: Elections Ontario

2018 Ontario general election
Party	Candidate	Votes	%
New Democratic	Sara Singh	12,892	38.37
Progressive Conservative	Harjit Jaswal	12,803	38.11
Liberal	Safdar Hussain	5,825	17.34
Green	Laila Zarrabi Yan	1,053	3.13
Libertarian	Andrew Hosie	644	1.92
Trillium	William Oprel	215	0.64
None of the Above	Mehdi Pakzad	166	0.49
Total valid votes		33,598	98.97
Total rejected, unmarked and declined ballots		351	1.03
Turnout		33,949	50.35
Eligible voters		67,432	
New Democratic pickup new district.			
Source: Elections Ontario

2014 general election redistributed results
Party	Vote	%
Liberal	10,768	38.33
New Democratic	8,187	29.14
Progressive Conservative	7,236	25.75
Green	1,678	5.97
Others	227	0.81

=== 1999–2007 ===
2003 Ontario general election
Party	Candidate	Votes	%	±%
Liberal	Linda Jeffrey	16,661	43.48	+15.48
Progressive Conservative	Joe Spina	15,656	40.86	–16.92
New Democratic	Kathy Pounder	4,827	12.60	–1.63
Green	Sanjeev Goel	820	2.14	–
Freedom	Wally Dove	356	0.93	–
Total valid votes		38,320	99.30	
Total rejected, unmarked and declined ballots		271	0.70	–0.40
Turnout		38,591	50.25	–1.51
Eligible voters		76,791		
Liberal gain from Progressive Conservative		Swing		+16.20
Source: Elections Ontario

1999 Ontario general election
Party	Candidate	Votes	%
Progressive Conservative	Joe Spina	20,623	57.77
Liberal	Gurjit S. Grewal	9,994	28.00
New Democratic	Paul Schmidt	5,080	14.23
Total valid votes		35,697	98.89
Total rejected, unmarked and declined ballots		399	1.11
Turnout		36,096	51.77
Eligible voters		69,728	
Progressive Conservative pickup new district.			
Source: Elections Ontario

== See also ==
- List of Ontario provincial electoral districts
- Canadian provincial electoral districts
