= Timiskaming—Cochrane (provincial electoral district) =

Provincial electoral district in Ontario, Canada

Coordinates: 47.77°N 79.97°W

Ontario electoral district
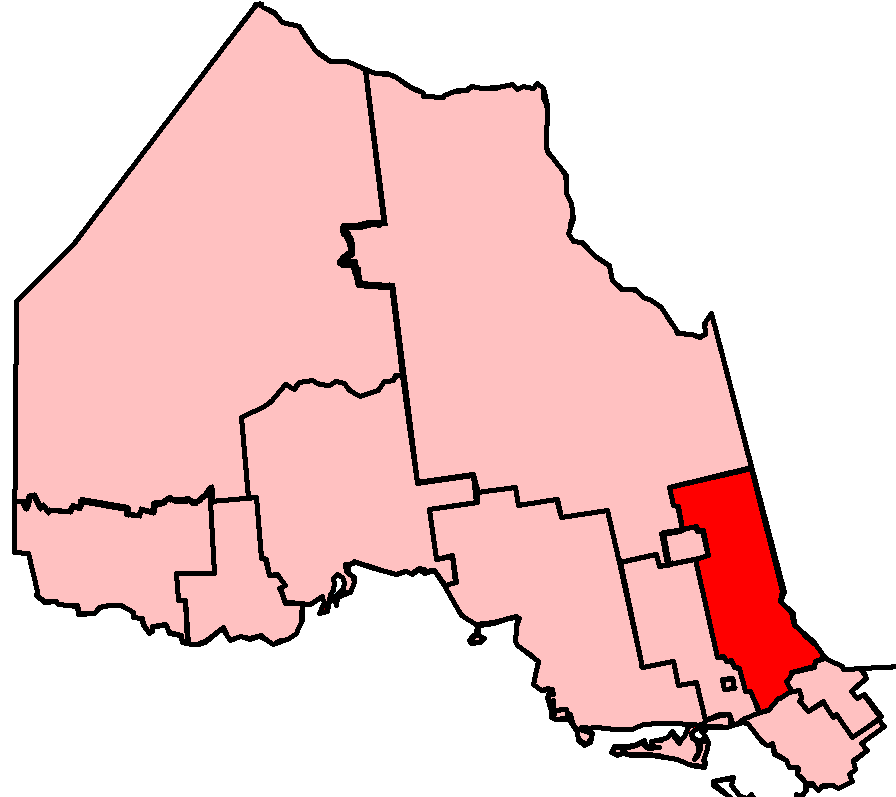

Provincial electoral district
- Legislature: Legislative Assembly of Ontario
MPP
John Vanthof
New Democratic
- District created: 1999
- First contested: 1999
- Last contested: 2025

Demographics
- Population (2016): 67,290
- Electors (2018): 52,322
- Area (km²): 39,864
- Pop. density (per km²): 1.7
- Census division(s): Timiskaming, Cochrane District, Sudbury District, Nipissing District

Timiskaming—Cochrane is a provincial electoral district in northern Ontario, Canada. It elects one member to the Legislative Assembly of Ontario.

== History ==
The riding was created in 1999 from parts of Cochrane North, Cochrane South, Timiskaming, Nickel Belt, Sudbury East, and Nipissing.

In 1996, Ontario was divided into the same electoral districts as those used for federal electoral purposes. They were redistributed whenever a readjustment took place at the federal level.

In 2005, legislation was passed by the Legislature to divide Ontario into 107 electoral districts, beginning with the next provincial election in 2007. The eleven northern electoral districts are those defined for federal purposes in 1996, based on the 1991 census (except for a minor boundary adjustment). The 96 southern electoral districts are those defined for federal electoral purposes in 2003, based on the 2001 census. Without this legislation, the number of electoral districts in Northern Ontario would have been reduced from eleven to ten.

== Geography ==
The riding includes the southeastern corner of the Cochrane District, all of Timiskaming, the southeastern corner of the Sudbury District, and the northern third of Nipissing District.

Included in the riding is the city of Temiskaming Shores and the towns of Cochrane, Iroquois Falls, Kirkland Lake, Larder Lake, McGarry, Englehart, Earlton, Cobalt, West Nipissing, and French River.

== Members ==
Timiskaming—Cochrane
Assembly	Years	Member	Party
Riding created from Cochrane North, Cochrane South, Timiskaming, Nickel Belt, Sudbury East and Nipissing
37th	1999–2003	David Ramsay	Liberal
38th	2003–2007	David Ramsay	Liberal
39th	2007–2011	David Ramsay	Liberal
40th	2011–2014	John Vanthof	New Democratic
41st	2014–2018	John Vanthof	New Democratic
42nd	2018–2022	John Vanthof	New Democratic
43rd	2022–2025	John Vanthof	New Democratic
44th	2025–present	John Vanthof	New Democratic

== Election results ==
Winning party in each polling division of Timiskaming—Cochrane at the 2025 Ontario general election

2025 Ontario general election
Party	Candidate	Votes	%	±%	Expenditures
New Democratic	John Vanthof	11,085	43.96	+1.22	$50,051
Progressive Conservative	Tory Delaurier	9,549	37.87	+2.64	$66,363
Liberal	Rick Ellsmere	2,446	9.70	+2.68	$0
Green	Kris Rivard	1,359	5.39	–1.13	$13,405
New Blue	Stephen MacLeod	777	3.08	–2.10	$0
Total valid votes/expense limit		25,216	99.27	–	$102,665
Total rejected, unmarked and declined ballots		185	0.73	+0.04	
Turnout		25,401	48.43	+5.82	
Eligible voters		52,448			
New Democratic hold		Swing		–0.71	
Source: Elections Ontario

Winning party in each polling division of Timiskaming—Cochrane at the 2022 Ontario general election

2022 Ontario general election
Party	Candidate	Votes	%	±%	Expenditures
New Democratic	John Vanthof	9,735	42.74	–18.46	$39,902
Progressive Conservative	Bill Foy	8,024	35.23	+12.79	$36,553
Liberal	Brian Johnson	1,600	7.02	–1.99	$0
Green	Kris Rivard	1,485	6.52	+3.89	$8,064
New Blue	Garry Andrade	1,181	5.18	–	$1,923
Ontario Party	Geoffrey Aitchison	349	1.53	–	$0
Libertarian	Eric Cummings	248	1.09	+0.39	$100
None of the Above	Jeff Wilkinson	157	0.69	–	$0
Total valid votes/expense limit		22,779	99.32	–	$85,519
Total rejected, unmarked and declined ballots		157	0.68	–0.45	
Turnout		22,936	42.61	–10.48	
Eligible voters		53,830			
New Democratic hold		Swing		–15.63	
Source: Elections Ontario

2018 Ontario general election
Party	Candidate	Votes	%	±%	Expenditures
New Democratic	John Vanthof	16,806	61.20	+5.72	$54,559
Progressive Conservative	Margaret Williams	6,160	22.43	+5.30	$20,986
Liberal	Brian A. Johnson	2,476	9.02	–14.20	$12,493
Northern Ontario Heritage	Shawn Poirier	1,105	4.02	+1.70	$225
Green	Casey Lalonde	723	2.63	+0.78	$0
Libertarian	Lawrence Schnarr	191	0.70	–	–
Total valid votes		27,461	98.87		
Total rejected, unmarked and declined ballots		314	1.13	+0.32	
Turnout		27,775	53.08	+2.41	
Eligible voters		52,322			
New Democratic hold		Swing		+0.21	
Source: Elections Ontario

2014 general election redistributed results
Party	Vote	%
New Democratic	14,661	55.48
Liberal	6,134	23.21
Progressive Conservative	4,527	17.13
Others	615	2.33
Green	489	1.85

2014 Ontario general election
Party	Candidate	Votes	%	±%
New Democratic	John Vanthof	14,661	55.48	+5.36
Liberal	Sébastien Goyer	6,134	23.21	–2.70
Progressive Conservative	Peter Politis	4,527	17.13	–4.04
Northern Ontario Heritage	Gino Chitaroni	615	2.33	+0.78
Green	Cody Fraser	489	1.85	+0.61
Total valid votes		26,426	99.19	
Total rejected, unmarked and declined ballots		216	0.81	+0.45
Turnout		26,642	50.68	+0.67
Eligible voters		52,572		
New Democratic hold		Swing		+4.03
Source: Elections Ontario

2011 Ontario general election
Party	Candidate	Votes	%	±%
New Democratic	John Vanthof	12,633	50.12	+9.57
Liberal	Denis Bonin	6,532	25.92	–16.98
Progressive Conservative	Randy Aulbrook	5,337	21.17	+7.63
Northern Ontario Heritage	Gerry Courville	391	1.55	–
Green	Tina Danese	312	1.24	–1.76
Total valid votes		25,205	99.64	
Total rejected, unmarked and declined ballots		91	0.36	–0.37
Turnout		25,296	50.01	–4.79
Eligible voters		50,580		
New Democratic gain from Liberal		Swing		+13.28
Source: Elections Ontario

2007 Ontario general election
Party	Candidate	Votes	%	±%
Liberal	David Ramsay	11,588	42.90	–16.66
New Democratic	John Vanthof	10,954	40.55	+22.07
Progressive Conservative	Doug Shearer	3,659	13.55	–6.83
Green	Patrick East	811	3.00	+1.43
Total valid votes		27,012	99.27	
Total rejected, unmarked and declined ballots		198	0.73	–0.01
Turnout		27,210	54.80	–6.35
Eligible voters		49,651		
Liberal hold		Swing		–19.36
Source: Elections Ontario

2003 Ontario general election
Party	Candidate	Votes	%	±%
Liberal	David Ramsay	18,499	59.56	+11.18
Progressive Conservative	Rick Brassard	6,330	20.38	–9.36
New Democratic	Ben Lefebvre	5,741	18.48	–3.39
Green	Paul O. Palmer	489	1.57	–
Total valid votes		31,059	99.26	
Total rejected, unmarked and declined ballots		230	0.74	–0.25
Turnout		31,289	61.15	–2.10
Eligible voters		51,169		
Liberal hold		Swing		+10.27
Source: Elections Ontario

1999 Ontario general election
Party	Candidate	Votes	%
Liberal	David Ramsay	16,877	48.38
Progressive Conservative	Rick Brassard	10,374	29.74
New Democratic	Len Wood	7,631	21.88
Total valid votes		34,882	99.02
Total rejected, unmarked and declined ballots		346	0.98
Turnout		35,228	63.25
Eligible voters		55,699	
Liberal pickup new district.			
Source: Elections Ontario

== 2007 electoral reform referendum ==
2007 Ontario electoral reform referendum
Side	Votes	%
First Past the Post	19,907	76.5
Mixed member proportional	6,130	23.5
Total valid votes	26,037	100.0

== See also ==
- List of Ontario provincial electoral districts
- Canadian provincial electoral districts
