= John Vanthof =

Canadian politician

John Vanthof MPP
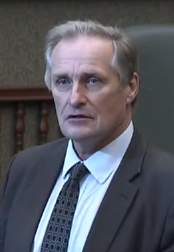
- Vanthof in 2020

Chief Whip of the Ontario New Democratic Party
- Incumbent
- Assumed office July 13, 2022
- Leader: Peter Tabuns (interim); Marit Stiles

Critic, Agriculture and Food, Rural Development
- Incumbent
- Assumed office August 23, 2018
- Leader: Andrea Horwath; Peter Tabuns (interim); Marit Stiles

Deputy Leader of the Ontario New Democratic Party
- In office August 23, 2018 – July 13, 2022 Serving with Sara Singh
- Leader: Andrea Horwath
- Preceded by: Jagmeet Singh
- Succeeded by: Sol Mamakwa and Doly Begum

Member of the Ontario Provincial Parliament for Timiskaming—Cochrane
- Incumbent
- Assumed office October 6, 2011
- Preceded by: David Ramsay

Personal details
- Born: 1963 (age 62–63) New Liskeard, Ontario, Canada
- Party: New Democratic
- Relatives: Ernie Hardeman (uncle)
- Occupation: Politician; dairy farmer
- Portfolio: Deputy Leader and critic for Agriculture and Food, and for Rural Development

John Vanthof MPP (/ˈvænθɔːf/ VAN-thoff, born c. 1963) is a Canadian politician in Ontario, Canada. He is a New Democratic member of the Legislative Assembly of Ontario who was elected in 2011. He represents the riding of Timiskaming—Cochrane. On August 23, 2018 he was named one of the party's two Deputy Leaders alongside Sara Singh, and critic for Agriculture and Food, and for Rural Development. As of August 11, 2024, he serves as the House leader of the Official Opposition and as critic for Agriculture and Food, for Rural Affairs.

== Background ==
Vanthof was born and raised on a dairy farm near New Liskeard, Ontario. He is the nephew of veteran Progressive Conservative MPP Ernie Hardeman. Prior to entering politics he was president of the Temiskaming Federation of Agriculture, a farmer's lobby group. He was a vocal opponent of the proposal to ship garbage from Toronto and bury it at Adams Mine.

== Politics ==
In the 2007 provincial election, Vanthof ran as the New Democrat candidate in the riding of Timiskaming—Cochrane. He was defeated by incumbent Liberal David Ramsay by 634 votes. He tried again in 2011 this time winning against Liberal candidate Denis Bonin by 6,101 votes. He was re-elected in the 2014 provincial election defeating Liberal candidate Sébastien Goyer by 8,490 votes. In the 2018 provincial election he was re-elected by a margin of 10,646 votes over Progressive Conservative Margaret Williams. Vanthof was re-elected for a third time in the 2022 provincial election, defeating Progressive Conservative candidate Bill Foy.

In opposition, he served as his party's critic for Natural Resources and Agriculture, Food and Rural Affairs.

== Electoral record ==
2025 Ontario general election: Timiskaming—Cochrane
Party	Candidate	Votes	%	±%	Expenditures
New Democratic	John Vanthof	11,085	43.96	+1.22	$50,051
Progressive Conservative	Tory Delaurier	9,549	37.87	+2.64	$66,363
Liberal	Rick Ellsmere	2,446	9.70	+2.68	$0
Green	Kris Rivard	1,359	5.39	–1.13	$13,405
New Blue	Stephen MacLeod	777	3.08	–2.10	$0
Total valid votes/expense limit		25,216	99.27	–0.05	$102,665
Total rejected, unmarked, and declined ballots		185	0.73	+0.05	
Turnout		25,401	51.55	+8.94	
Eligible voters		49,278			
New Democratic hold		Swing		–0.71	
Source: Elections Ontario

2022 Ontario general election: Timiskaming—Cochrane
Party	Candidate	Votes	%	±%	Expenditures
New Democratic	John Vanthof	9,735	42.74	−18.46	$39,902
Progressive Conservative	Bill Foy	8,024	35.23	+12.79	$36,553
Liberal	Brian Johnson	1,600	7.02	−1.99	$0
Green	Kris Rivard	1,485	6.52	+3.89	$8,064
New Blue	Garry Andrade	1,181	5.18		$1,923
Ontario Party	Geoffrey Aitchison	349	1.53		$0
Libertarian	Eric Cummings	248	1.09	+0.39	$100
None of the Above	Jeff Wilkinson	157	0.69		$0
Total valid votes/expense limit		22,779	99.32	+0.45	$85,519
Total rejected, unmarked, and declined ballots		157	0.68	-0.45	
Turnout		22,936	42.61	-10.47	
Eligible voters		52,988			
New Democratic hold		Swing		−15.63	
Source(s): "Summary of Valid Votes Cast for Each Candidate" (PDF). Elections Ontario. 2022. Archived from the original on May 18, 2023.; "Statistical Summary by Electoral District" (PDF). Elections Ontario. 2022. Archived from the original on May 21, 2023.

2018 Ontario general election: Timiskaming—Cochrane
Party	Candidate	Votes	%	±%
New Democratic	John Vanthof	16,806	61.20	+6.17
Progressive Conservative	Margaret Williams	6,160	22.43	+4.94
Liberal	Brian A. Johnson	2,476	9.02	-14.12
Northern Ontario	Shawn Poirier	1,105	4.02	+1.67
Green	Casey Lalonde	723	2.63	+0.64
Libertarian	Lawrence Schnarr	191	0.70	-0.05
Total valid votes		27,461	100.0	
New Democratic hold		Swing		
Source: Elections Ontario

2014 Ontario general election: Timiskaming—Cochrane
Party	Candidate	Votes	%	±%
New Democratic	John Vanthof	14,651	55.03	+4.91
Liberal	Sébastien Goyer	6,161	23.14	-2.78
Progressive Conservative	Peter Politis	4,656	17.49	-3.69
Northern Ontario Heritage	Gino Chitaroni	625	2.35	+0.80
Green	Cody Fraser	529	1.99	+0.75
Total valid votes		26,622	100.00	
New Democratic hold		Swing		+3.85
Source: Elections Ontario

2011 Ontario general election: Timiskaming—Cochrane
Party	Candidate	Votes	%	±%
New Democratic	John Vanthof	12,633	50.12	+9.57
Liberal	Denis Bonin	6,532	25.92	-16.98
Progressive Conservative	Randy Aulbrook	5,337	21.18	+7.63
Northern Ontario Heritage	Gerry Courville	391	1.55	
Green	Tina Danese	312	1.24	-1.76
Total valid votes		25,205	100.00	
Total rejected, unmarked and declined ballots		91	0.36	
Turnout		25,296	50.04	
Eligible voters		50,554		
New Democratic gain from Liberal		Swing		+13.28
Source: Elections Ontario

2007 Ontario general election: Timiskaming—Cochrane
Party	Candidate	Votes	%	±%
Liberal	David Ramsay	11,588	42.90	-16.66
New Democratic	John Vanthof	10,954	40.55	+22.07
Progressive Conservative	Doug Shearer	3,659	13.55	-6.83
Green	Patrick East	811	3.00	+1.43
Total valid votes		27,012	100.00	
