= Brampton North (provincial electoral district) =

Provincial electoral district in Ontario, Canada

Coordinates: 43.74°N 79.77°W

Ontario electoral district
- Location in Brampton

Provincial electoral district
- Legislature: Legislative Assembly of Ontario
MPP
Graham McGregor
Progressive Conservative
- District created: 2015
- First contested: 2018
- Last contested: 2025

Demographics
- Population (2016): 118,185
- Electors (2018): 77,609
- Area (km²): 34
- Pop. density (per km²): 3,476
- Census division: Peel
- Census subdivision: Brampton

Brampton North is a provincial electoral district in Ontario, Canada. It was originally created prior to the 1987 election from part of Brampton. It existed for the 1987, 1990, and 1995 elections. It was abolished in 1999 into Bramalea—Gore—Malton—Springdale, Brampton Centre, Brampton West—Mississauga. For the 2018 election, it was re-created from Bramalea—Gore—Malton, Brampton—Springdale, and Brampton West.

== Boundaries ==
In 1987, the boundaries consisted of the city of Brampton north of the following line (from east to west): from the city limits going east along Highway 7 to Queen Street East, then west to Kennedy Road, then north along Kennedy Road to Vodden Street, then west to Main Street, then north along Main Street and Highway 10 to Highway 7 and then west to the city limits.

== Members of Provincial Parliament ==
Brampton North
Assembly	Years	Member	Party
34th	1987–1990	Carman McClelland	Liberal
35th	1990–1995	Carman McClelland	Liberal
36th	1995–1999	Joe Spina	Progressive Conservative
Riding dissolved into Bramalea—Gore—Malton—Springdale, Brampton Centre, and Brampton West—Mississauga
Riding re-created from Bramalea—Gore—Malton, Brampton—Springdale, and Brampton West
42nd	2018–2022	Kevin Yarde	New Democratic
42nd	2022–2022	Kevin Yarde	Independent
43rd	2022–present	Graham McGregor	Progressive Conservative

== Election results ==
=== 2018–Present ===
Winning party in each polling division of Brampton North at the 2025 Ontario general election

2025 Ontario general election
Party	Candidate	Votes	%	±%
Progressive Conservative	Graham McGregor	17,597	57.52	+12.53
Liberal	Ranjit Singh Bagga	9,270	30.30	+1.53
New Democratic	Ruby Zaman	2,479	8.10	–11.71
Green	Sameera Falcon Khan	746	2.44	–0.54
New Blue	Melanie Porte	499	1.63	–0.40
Total valid votes		30,591	99.47	
Total rejected, unmarked and declined ballots		163	0.53	–0.14
Turnout		30,754	38.48	+0.02
Eligible voters		79,914		
Progressive Conservative hold		Swing		▲5.50
Source: Elections Ontario

Winning party in each polling division of Brampton North at the 2022 Ontario general election

2022 Ontario general election
Party	Candidate	Votes	%	±%	Expenditures
Progressive Conservative	Graham McGregor	13,509	44.99	+8.70	$71,616
Liberal	Harinder Malhi	8,639	28.77	+7.55	$51,025
New Democratic	Sandeep Singh	5,949	19.81	–17.73	$93,448
Green	Aneep Dhade	895	2.98	–0.47	$1,807
New Blue	Jerry Fussek	610	2.03	–	$2,291
Ontario Party	Julia Bauman	423	1.41	–	$0
Total valid votes/expense limit		30,025	99.33	–	$110,020
Total rejected, unmarked and declined ballots		203	0.67	–0.35	
Turnout		30,228	38.46	–13.12	
Eligible voters		78,586			
Progressive Conservative gain from New Democratic		Swing		+0.58	
Source: Elections Ontario

2018 Ontario general election
Party	Candidate	Votes	%
New Democratic	Kevin Yarde	14,877	37.55
Progressive Conservative	Ripudaman Dhillon	14,380	36.29
Liberal	Harinder Malhi	8,410	21.22
Green	Pauline Thornham	1,366	3.45
Libertarian	Gregory Argue	591	1.49
Total valid votes		39,624	98.98
Total rejected, unmarked and declined ballots		407	1.02
Turnout		40,031	51.58
Eligible voters		77,609	
New Democratic pickup new district.			
Source: Elections Ontario

2014 general election redistributed results
Party	Vote	%
Liberal	13,460	39.93
New Democratic	10,555	31.31
Progressive Conservative	8,239	24.44
Green	1,149	3.41
Others	309	0.92

=== 1987–1999 ===
1995 Ontario general election
Party	Candidate	Votes	%	±%
Progressive Conservative	Joe Spina	20,148	49.47	+26.70
Liberal	Carman McClelland	14,800	36.34	+1.41
New Democratic	Johannes Devries	5,288	12.98	–21.65
Natural Law	Lester J. Newby	494	1.21	–
Total valid votes		40,730	99.13	
Total rejected, unmarked and declined ballots		356	0.87	–0.59
Turnout		41,086	59.17	+0.82
Eligible voters		69,435		
Progressive Conservative gain from Liberal		Swing		+12.65
Source: Elections Ontario

1990 Ontario general election
Party	Candidate	Votes	%	±%
Liberal	Carman McClelland	11,686	34.92	–15.90
New Democratic	Johannes Devries	11,588	34.63	+10.93
Progressive Conservative	Gary Heighington	7,619	22.77	–2.72
Family Coalition	Margaret Lloyd	1,466	4.38	–
Libertarian	Lewis D. Jackson	669	2.00	–
Independent	Martha MacDonald	434	1.30	–
Total valid votes		33,462	98.55	
Total rejected, unmarked and declined ballots		494	1.45	+0.82
Turnout		33,956	58.35	+4.29
Eligible voters		58,193		
Liberal hold		Swing		–13.41
Source: Elections Ontario

1987 Ontario general election
Party	Candidate	Votes	%
Liberal	Carman McClelland	14,298	50.82
Progressive Conservative	Jo-Anne Robertson	7,170	25.48
New Democratic	John Deamer	6,667	23.70
Total valid votes		28,135	99.36
Total rejected ballots		181	0.64
Turnout		28,316	54.06
Eligible voters		52,380	
Liberal pickup new district.			
Source: Elections Ontario

== See also ==
- List of Ontario provincial electoral districts
- Canadian provincial electoral districts
