= Sara Singh =

Canadian politician (born 1985)

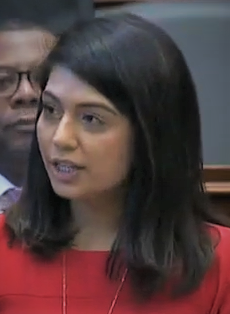

Deputy Leader of the Ontario New Democratic Party
- In office August 23, 2018 – July 13, 2022 Serving with John Vanthof
- Leader: Andrea Horwath
- Preceded by: Jagmeet Singh
- Succeeded by: Sol Mamakwa and Doly Begum

Member of the Ontario Provincial Parliament for Brampton Centre
- In office June 7, 2018 – May 3, 2022
- Preceded by: first member
- Succeeded by: Charmaine Williams

Personal details
- Born: March 19, 1985 (age 41)
- Party: New Democratic

Sara Singh (born 1985) is a Canadian politician. She was one of the two Deputy Leaders of the Ontario New Democratic Party, alongside John Vanthof, and also Opposition Critic for Attorney General from 2018 until 2022. Singh was elected to the Legislative Assembly of Ontario in the 2018 provincial election at the age of 33. She represented the riding of Brampton Centre as a member of the Ontario New Democratic Party until her defeat in the 2022 Ontario general election.

Singh was born in Brampton where her parents met in the early 1980s. Her mother is from Guyana and her father is from Punjab, India. She is the first Indo-Caribbean female to be elected to the Ontario legislature.

She is the founding director of Broadening Horizons, a not-for-profit organization that educates youth about social justice issues and the arts, was Vice-President of Brampton Caledon Community Living

Singh has a master's degree in international development studies from St. Mary's University and a B.A. in political science from York University's Glendon Campus, and has recently earned a Ph.D. specializing in public policy from Toronto Metropolitan University.

== Election results ==
2022 Ontario general election: Brampton Centre
Party	Candidate	Votes	%	±%	Expenditures
Progressive Conservative	Charmaine Williams	10,119	41.36	+3.26	$71,062
New Democratic	Sara Singh	6,522	26.66	-11.71	$68,178
Liberal	Safdar Hussain	6,119	25.01	+7.68	$34,979
Green	Karitsa Tye	882	3.61	+0.47	$344
New Blue	Kathrin Matusiak	821	3.36	N/A	$3,010
Total valid votes/expense limit		24,463	99.40	+0.43	$93,930
Total rejected, unmarked, and declined ballots		139	0.60	-0.43	
Turnout		24,602	36.67		
Eligible voters		66,997			
Progressive Conservative gain from New Democratic		Swing		+7.48	
Source(s): "Summary of Valid Votes Cast for Each Candidate" (PDF). Elections Ontario. 2022. Archived from the original on 2023-05-18.; "Statistical Summary by Electoral District" (PDF). Elections Ontario. 2022. Archived from the original on 2023-05-21.

2018 Ontario general election: Brampton Centre
Party	Candidate	Votes	%
New Democratic	Sara Singh	12,892	38.37%
Progressive Conservative	Harjit Jaswal	12,803	38.11%
Liberal	Safdar Hussain	5,825	17.34%
Green	Laila Zarrabi Yan	1,053	3.13%
Libertarian	Andrew Hosie	644	1.92%
Trillium	William Oprel	216	0.64%
None of the Above	Mehdi Pakzad	166	0.49%
Total valid votes		33,598	100.0
Source: Elections Ontario
