= 2006 Brampton municipal election =

2006 Brampton mayoral election
- November 16, 2006
- Turnout: 30.82%
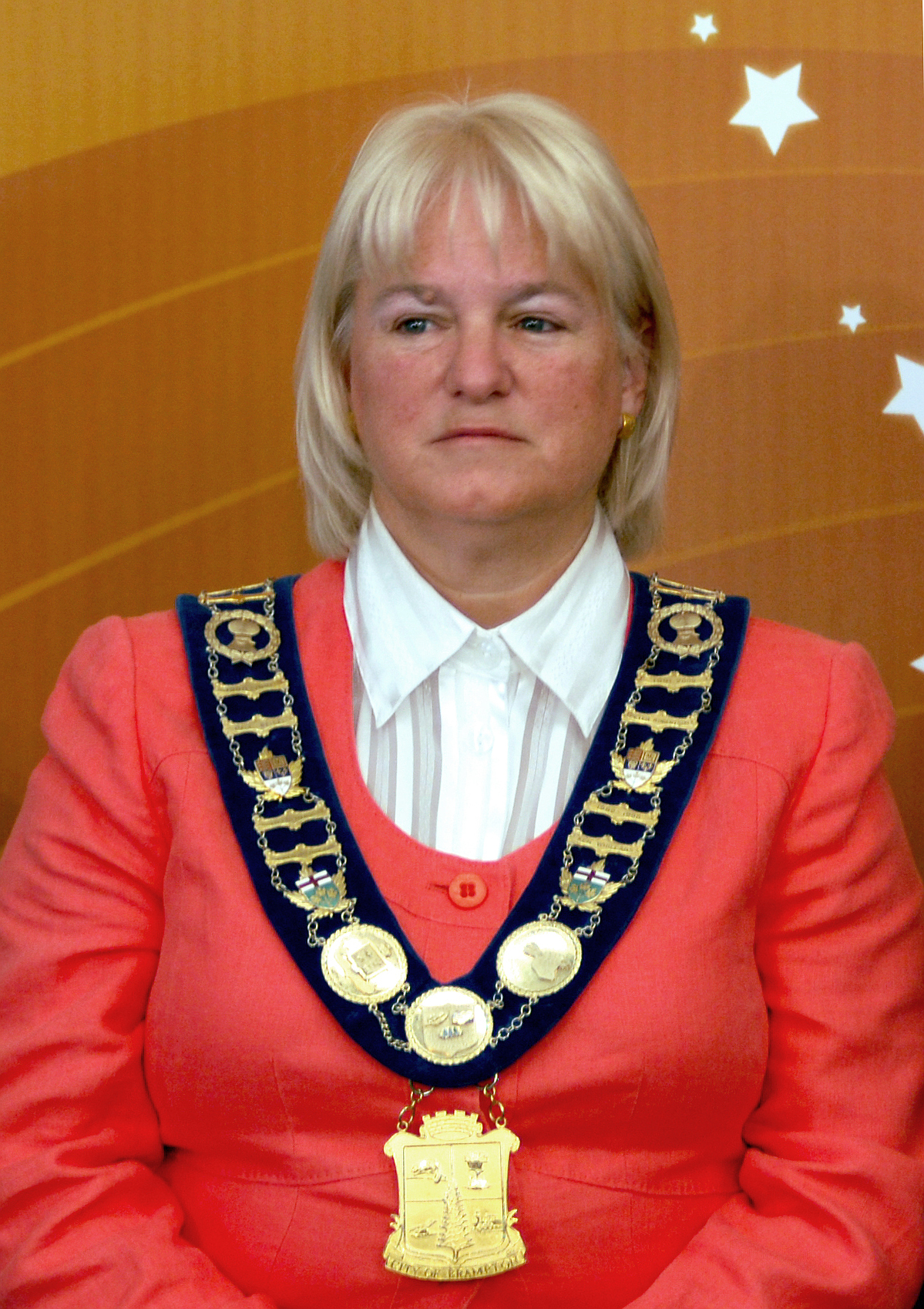
		RS	JM
Candidate	Susan Fennell	Raj Sharda	John R. A. Moulton
Popular vote	51,036	9,585	4,007
Percentage	74.85%	14.06%	5.88%
Mayor before election
Susan Fennell
Elected mayor
Susan Fennell

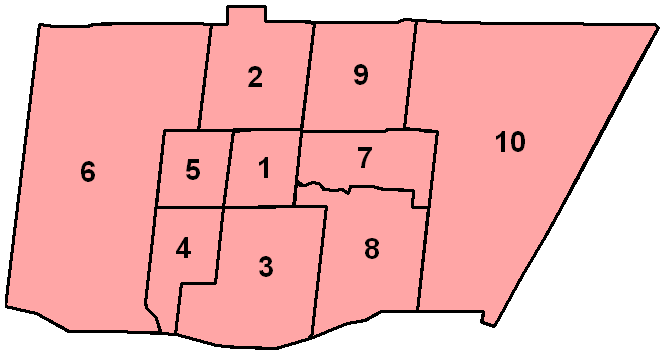
Map of Brampton's wards

The Brampton municipal election, 2006 took place on 13 November 2006, to elect a mayor, five regional councillors and five city councillors in the city of Brampton, Ontario, Canada. It was held in conjunction with all other municipalities in Ontario. See 2006 Ontario municipal elections.

It was referred to as CityVote 2006 by the city's website.

The nomination period ended on Friday 29 September 2006; thirty candidates registered in the two weeks prior. Six candidates withdrew after this point, before the cut-off of 5 pm Monday. There was a total of 96 candidates running for political office.

Over the various days of voting, 68,186 Brampton residents cast ballots; there were 226,869 registered voters in the city at the time. This means there was a 30.8% turn-out.

== Candidates ==
=== Mayor ===
==== Results ====
Candidate	Vote	%
Susan Fennell (incumbent, winner)	51,036	74.8
Raj Sharda	9,585	14.1
John R. A. Moulton	4,007	5.9
Sunny Gandhi	2,343	3.4
Amjid Iqbal	1,215	1.8

==== Profiles ====
===== Susan Fennell (incumbent) =====
OFFICIAL WEBSITE | GUARDIAN ARTICLE

Mayor Fennell served as a city councillor, then a regional councillor, prior to becoming Mayor. She is currently a member of the Peel Regional Police Services Board, Large Urban Mayors Caucus of Ontario, the board of Hydro One Brampton, the Greater Toronto Marketing Alliance, Toronto Region Immigrant Employment Council, and two time chair of the Infrastructure and Transportant Committee of the Federation of Canadian Municipalities. Previously she was commissioner of the National Women's Hockey League, and involved in the Brampton Board of Trade, Downtown Business Improvement Area, and Sheridan College Board of Governors.

===== Sunny Gandhi =====
OFFICIAL WEBSITE | GUARDIAN INTERVIEW

Gandhi is a 29-year-old small business owner, with no previous political experience.

===== Amjid Iqbal =====
GUARDIAN ARTICLE, stating Iqbal did not participate in interviews.

Iqbal is a 35-year-old mortgage agent, at one point he was an automobile trader. The extent of Iqbal's previous political experience was a 2003 campaign for regional council, placing fourth out of four candidates with 5.74%.

===== John R.A. Moulton =====
GUARDIAN INTERVIEW

Moulton is a 49-year-old "entrepreneur", living in downtown Brampton. He is placed 170th out of 174 in the Canadian Classic Table Hockey Federation's rankings as of October 9, 2006. Moulton described himself as a "clown" in the closing statements of a televised debate. Fennell asked Moulton not to make such self-defacing comments. Moulton's only other comments were regarding the level of Fennell's campaign donations, a practice he does not participate in, feeling it leads to bias; Fennell defends the process, stating it essentially to letting citizens know of her platform.

Moulton previously lost to incumbent Grant Gibson in 2003, when aiming to be elected as Regional Council member 1 & 5. Little press, if any, was given to Moulton at that time.

Moulton left no contact information for the voting public on the City's election website, and little to no information is available on him online.

- Grewal, San (November 6, 2006). "Sprawl, gridlock dominate tight race". Toronto Star.
- Grewal, San (November 2, 2006). "Growth, gridlock loom large". Toronto Star.
- "Candidates". Toronto Star. November 9, 2006.
- Moreau, Nicholas (November 16, 2006). "Two Brampton residents announce 2010 mayoral intentions". The Brampton News. Archived from the original on March 30, 2008.

===== Raj Sharda =====
OFFICIAL WEBSITE | GUARDIAN INTERVIEW

Rajneesh Sharda is a 40-year-old lawyer. He was appointed as a replacement councillor for both the Town of Oakville and the Halton Region, upon retirement of the Ward 2 representative, serving from June to 30 November 2000. Sharda serves as a provincial adjudicator on the Ontario Consent and Capacity Board, is immediate past president of the Halton Multicultural Council, and was once on the board of the Advocacy Centre for the Elderly. He is legal advisor for the Brampton Small Business Enterprise Centre and the Indo-Canada Chamber of Commerce, He was endorsed for mayor by the Toronto Star on November 6, 2006.

==== Media participation ====
- The Brampton Guardian: Susan Fennell, Sunny Gandhi, John Moulton, and Raj Sharda participated in interviews with the Guardian. The newspaper was unable to attract Amjid Iqbal, despite multiple attempts.
- Rogers Television: Susan Fennell, John Moulton, and Raj Sharda all participated in a televised debate for Rogers Cable. Sunny Gandhi had accepted, but declined when he found out the interview wasn't public; Amjid Iqbal gave the Brampton Guardian no reason for his absence. The program repeats frequently on channel 10 for any Rogers subscriber in Brampton.
- Wikinews: None of the five candidates have completed interviews for Wikinews. Raj Sharda's campaign had promised a response, but nothing has been received. John Moulton replied, denying an interview. Campaign offices for Susan Fennell, Sunny Gandhi, and Amjid Iqbal did not reply.
- The Brampton News: Playwright columnist T. Gregory Argall emailed all of his council candidates, as well as the mayoral noms. Not revealing he was writing for the News. Moulton and Sharda replied via email. Gandhi and Fennell both arrived at his house. As per routine, Iqbal did not reply in any fashion. Note that all Wikinews articles were republished on The Brampton News.

=== Wards 1, 5 ===
==== Regional council ====
Long-time incumbent Elaine Moore had three people interested in replacing her as Regional Councillor; she won her re-election with a strong majority.

Candidate	Vote	%
Bill Bousfield	692	6.69
Janet Hamilton	1620	15.67
Tejinder Lamba	847	8.19
Elaine Moore, incumbent, winner OFFICIAL WEBSITE	7182	69.45

==== City council ====
Incumbent Grant Gibson had six candidates challenging his re-election; he was re-elected by over half of participating voters. Gibson had held the seat for more than a decade, as of the election day.

Among his challengers was Stephanie Beaumier, daughter of Brampton West MP Colleen Beaumier. As he dropped out of the campaign after nomination lists were finalised, Malcolm Jones' name still appeared on the ballots. Despite no longer officially running, he took fourth place, out of seven.

Candidate	Vote	%
Stephanie Beaumier OFFICIAL WEBSITE	3215	30.84
Grant Gibson, incumbent, winner	5335	51.17
Malcolm Jones OFFICIAL WEBSITE	320	3.07
Larry Lee OFFICIAL WEBSITE	256	2.46
Jeffrey Schrik OFFICIAL WEBSITE	194	1.86
Jagtar Shergill OFFICIAL WEBSITE	1034	9.92
Whoston Wray	72	0.69

=== Wards 2, 6 ===
==== Regional council ====
One of the longest sitting incumbents, Paul Palleschi had five people attempting to take him out of office. Palleschi received roughly 45% of the vote.

Candidate	Vote	%
Vicky Colbourne OFFICIAL WEBSITE	1767	14.00
David Esho OFFICIAL WEBSITE	548	4.34
Curtis Grant OFFICIAL WEBSITE	1653	13.10
Chuck Jeffrey OFFICIAL WEBSITE	1396	11.06
Paul Palleschi, incumbent, winner	5766	45.68
Tejinder Singh	1493	11.83

==== City council ====
Incumbent John Hutton had ten candidates challenging his re-election, the most of any riding. Due to the berth of competition, he was only re-elected with 27% support. Among the challengers was Doug Whillans, son of Ken Whillans, a former Brampton mayor. As of election day, Hutton had held the seat for 21 years.

Candidate	Vote	%
Derrick Coke OFFICIAL WEBSITE	1768	13.70
Jassi Dhillon	185	1.43
Navdeep Gill WEBSITE UNARCHIVED	1790	13.87
Ralph Irving Greene	1466	11.36
Jim Howell	535	4.15
John A. Hutton, incumbent, winner	3552	27.53
Adrian Avinash Lalla	45	0.35
Paul Mangat	142	1.10
Mathew Njenga OFFICIAL WEBSITE	454	3.52
Joyce Rodriguez OFFICIAL WEBSITE	1175	9.11
Doug Whillans ARCHIVED OFFICIAL WEBSITE	1792	13.89

=== Wards 3, 4 ===
==== Regional council ====
Businessman and 2005 Brampton Citizen of the Year John Sanderson beat incumbent Susan DiMarco. One of four challengers, Sanderson had previous run and lost for the same ward in 2003. With a mere 292 votes dividing them, the race between Sanderson and DiMarco was the last to be declared in all of Peel.

Candidate	Vote	%
Tibor Bankuti	181	1.22
Susan DiMarco, incumbent OFFICIAL WEBSITE	5431	36.60
Theo Goary	463	3.12
John Sanderson, winner OFFICIAL WEBSITE	5723	38.56
Sukhwant Thethi OFFICIAL WEBSITE	3042	20.50

Note, Tejinder Singh Bhatta has withdrawn from the race.

==== City council ====
Incumbent Bob Callahan easily won this race. Once an MPP, Callahan won over his nearest competitor by 33.36%.

Babra's second-place finish was unexpected, as while he participated in a Brampton Guardian interview, he did not reply to The Toronto Star or The Brampton News/Wikinews. His email address was inactive throughout the duration of his campaign.

Candidate	Vote	%
Balbir Babra	3212	21.94
Manny Bianchi-Morfino	264	1.80
Bob Callahan, incumbent, winner	8094	55.30
Dolly Khokhar	289	1.97
Maria Peart	585	4.00
Tim Turcott	251	1.71
Innocent Watat	61	0.42
Sheila White OFFICIAL WEBSITE	1881	12.85

Note, Ernie Macdonald has withdrawn from the race.

=== Wards 7, 8 ===
==== Regional council ====
Long-time incumbent Gael Miles easily won the election for regional councillor (Wards 7 and 8), against political newcomer John Villella.

Candidate	Vote	%
Gael Miles, incumbent OFFICIAL WEBSITE	11071	87.67
John Villella OFFICIAL WEBSITE	1557	12.33

==== City council ====
Incumbent Sandra Hames won with little trouble, garnering also three out of every four votes.

Candidate	Vote	%
Khalid Alvi as "K. Alvi", ran in 2003 election for city wards 7 & 8	1069	8.49
Tom Armstrong	1269	10.07
Sandra Hames, incumbent OFFICIAL WEBSITE	9317	73.96
Vaughn Parker	212	1.68
John B. Spry, ran in 2003 election for wards 9 & 10.	730	5.80

Note, Curtis Grant and Oscar R. Odulio have both withdrawn from the race.

=== Wards 9, 10 ===
==== Regional council ====
Incumbent John Sprovieri had six candidates challenging his re-election, which he won with 44.91% support. Among the challengers is Derek Begley, son of retired regional councillor Rhoda Begley. Johal is known in the ward as a star candidate.

Candidate	Vote	%
Derek Begley OFFICIAL WEBSITE	1364	8.25
Sherdaljit Dhillon	2148	12.99
Mahen Gupta	760	4.60
Satpaul Johal	3707	22.42
Dalbir S. Kathuria	995	6.02
Vahid Saadati-Khanshir	133	0.80
John Sprovieri, incumbent, winner OFFICIAL WEBSITE	7425	44.91

==== City council ====
Garnett Manning had five people contesting his seat, which he eventually lost to Vicky Dhillon. Manning had beat Dhillon by a slim amount in the 2003 election. At time of election, Dhillon was the Brampton—Springdale riding association president for the Liberal Party of Canada (Ontario); it is unknown if he will retain this position. Among the other candidates was Daljit Gill, a one-term Peel District School Board trustee.

Candidate	Vote	%
Stella Ambler OFFICIAL WEBSITE	4029	23.80
Mandeep Dhaliwal OFFICIAL WEBSITE	2879	17.01
Vicky Dhillon, winner OFFICIAL WEBSITE	4700	27.77
Daljit Gill	620	3.66
Nalem Malik	439	2.59
Garnett Manning, incumbent ARCHIVED OFFICIAL WEBSITE	4259	25.16

Note, Iqbal Dhillon, David A. Esho, and Whoston Wray have all withdrawn from the race.

== Peel District School Board ==
The Peel District School Board runs a website about its trustees and their roles.

=== Wards 1, 3 ===
- David Green, incumbent
- Ian Irving
- Dhaval R. B. Patel
- Richard Gordon Patywich
- Satwant Singh Sidhu

Note, Laura J. Zilney has withdrawn from the race.

=== Wards 2, 9, 10 ===
There is no incumbent in these wards, as one-term trustee Daljit Gill is running for city council.

- Gurmail Singh Dhir
- Suman Gupta
- Ibrar Khan OFFICIAL WEBSITE
- Iqbal Mahal
- Suzanne Nurse OFFICIAL WEBSITE
- Maninder Sethi
- Harbans Singh

Note, Mahesh Malhi, Pretam Kaur Purewal, Maninder Singh, and Raguhbir Singh have all withdrawn from the race.

=== Wards 4, 5, 6 ===
- Steve Kavanagh, incumbent OFFICIAL WEBSITE
- Victoria D. Nelson, ran in 2003 election for wards 4, 5 & 6.
- Gary Rao
- Raguhbir Singh
- Carole Walker
- Fraser K. Williamson, ran in 2003 election for wards 4, 5 & 6.

=== Wards 7, 8 ===
Beryl Ford is the only person elected by acclamation to any political seat in Brampton; this is her eighth term as a trustee.

- Beryl Ford, incumbent

== Dufferin-Peel Catholic District School Board ==
=== Wards 1, 3, 4 ===
There is no incumbent in these wards.

- Tony Da Silva
- Shirley Packalen
- Steven Thomas, ran in 2003 election for wards 1, 3 & 4

=== Wards 2, 5, 6 ===
Debates in this ward received extremely small audiences. Eleven, then six people showed up to two separate evenings.

- Frank Turner
- Linda Zanella, incumbent

=== Wards 7, 8, 9, 10 ===
There is no incumbent in these wards.

- Joyce Anderson
- Lety Armstrong
- Janice Gordon
- Jeffrey Grima
- Carmela Marino

== Conseil scolaire de district du Centre-Sud-Ouest ==
None of the incumbents are seeking re-election

Candidate	Vote	%
Mark David de Pelham	53	46.90
Christine Guindy	60	53.10

== Conseil scolaire de district catholique Centre-Sud ==
Candidate	Vote	%
Anne Burke-Gauthier	183	55.29
Yvonne Musau Kabeya	65	19.64
Rene Riopel	83	25.08
