= Kwakiutl (statue) =

Totem sculpture by Simon Charlie

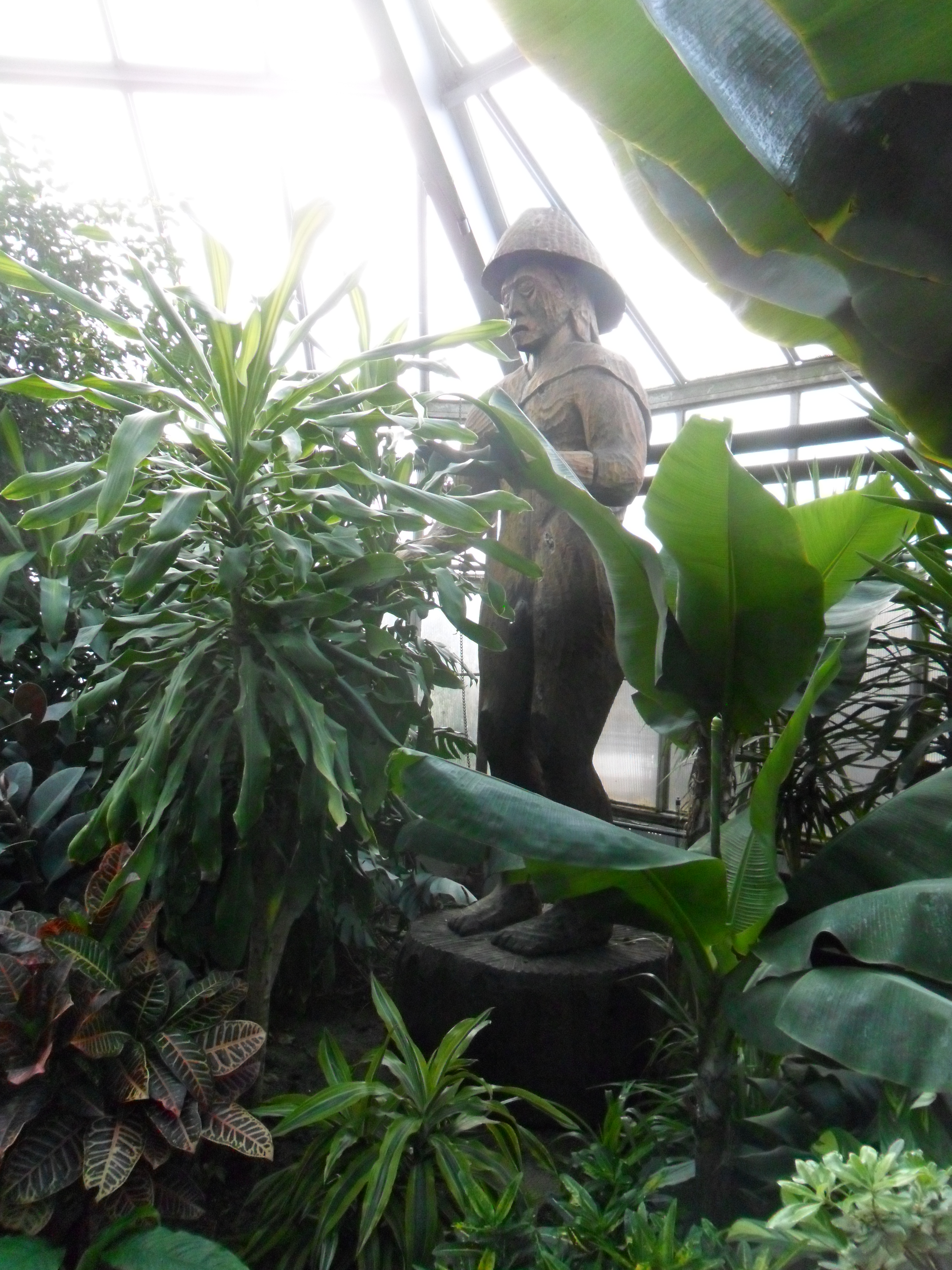
- Artist: Simon Charlie
- Year: 1972
- Type: cedar wood
- Dimensions: 270 cm (108 in)
- Location: Chinguacousy Park greenhouse, Brampton, Ontario, Canada
- 43°43′22.19″N 79°43′16.25″W
- Owner: City of Brampton

Kwakiutl (or variously KwaKiutl) is a totem sculpture by Cowichan Tribes artist Simon Charlie, which has caused controversy for its nudity over multiple decades of display in Chinguacousy Township, and later Brampton, both near Toronto in Ontario, Canada. Charlie, also known as Hwunumetse', later received the Order of Canada. The 9-foot-tall cedar wood sculpture is best known for its exposed male genitals.

== Creation ==
Named after a native Canadian, Chinguacousy Township was rapidly growing due to the Bramalea development, initiated in the late 1950s and early 1960s. Simon Charlie was hired as the artist for a statue that was commissioned for a new township hall. Charlie was a sculptor of the Cowichan Tribes of the Coast Salish peoples. The Indians of Canada pavilion at Expo 67 included a totem pole and "welcome figure" carved by Charlie and two Kwakwaka'wakw (Kwakiutl) artists. For the 1971 centennial of British Columbia, Charlie and thirteen other carvers were commissioned to carve totems presented to each of the other nine provinces, two territories, and the federal government. Internationally collected and displayed, he had already been awarded the Canadian Centennial Medal.

The figure depicted by the statue is that of a nearly-naked Aboriginal man, and the name of the sculpture refers to a Pacific Northwest coast tribe. He wears a wide-brimmed Kwakwaka'wakw hat, and a cape. The sculpture features outstretched arms and exposed male genitals. The statue is made of cedar wood, and 9-foot tall.

== Exhibition and reception ==
The Township of Chinguacousy unveiled the sculpture on July 19, 1972, in front of roughly 100 spectators. It was originally intended to be placed at the doors of the Chinguacousy Township municipal offices.

Reverend Edward Robinson of All People's Church, in attendance, described the sculpture as "disgusting". The Reverend insisted that the sculpture violated Christian principles, morality, and decency. According to The Globe and Mail:

"A lot of Christians wouldn't want their children to see it," said Mr. Robinson, urging that it be dispatched to Toronto where presumably he believes (a) there are no Christians; or (b) their children have already seen everything. He knows his Toronto; we'll give him that.

He left the event relatively promptly. The Globe and Mail ran an editorial commenting they were "striving (against the wicked odds that only Toronto can provide) to view the situation with proper seriousness. But Mr. Robinson has not been making it easy for us." The paper suggested that Robinson's insights "doubtless would have stopped Michelangelo in his tracks and branded him as nothing more than a dirty chisler."

Reeve Robert Williams suggested ferns and flowers indigenous to British Columbia would be brought in, and planted around the statue. Williams insisted the flora would not obscure anatomy. Township Council voted to place the statue in a "suitable place" in the yet-to-be-opened municipal offices. The sculptor suggested that he was not even sure what a fig leaf looked like, an often suggested addition, and no coverage was requested during the commission.

By late August, the statue had developed a crack in its back. According to a Canadian Press report, "One civic official said it was probably the weight of the moral controversy, rather than the weather, which broke Kwakiutl′s back."

On January 1, 1974, the Town of Brampton, some of the Township of Chinguacousy, a portion of Toronto Township, and most of Toronto Gore Township merged into the City of Brampton. Municipal offices for Brampton were moved to the Civic Centre, and the statue moved into the Chinguacousy branch of the Brampton Public Library, within the same building. Shirley Morriss was the curator of the facility, until 1991.

=== Changing locations ===
Tom Drynan was named executive director of the Brampton Public Library system in July 1993. In August that year, Drynan decided to evict the sculpture, after three years at the entrance of the art gallery at the Brampton Library branch. In a letter to community services commissioner Donald M. Gordon, Drynan wrote: "I am sure that the statue has artistic merit and needs to be preserved. However, it is quite inappropriate in its present location within the newly renovated gallery. Its presence dominates any other exhibits which are placed in the area. I hope we can find a solution without having yet another tempest in a teapot."

A report was approved by Brampton City Council during a council meeting on August 16, 1993. The report suggested that in British Columbia, such sculptures are frequently displayed outdoors. As Chinguacousy Park bears an Aboriginal name, it was deemed appropriate for the sculpture to be used at the entrance of the nearby area. It was to be bolted to a 1.5-metre high (five-foot high) tree stump.

At some point before May 2010, the sculpture was moved into the Chinguacousy Park greenhouse. Former mayor Peter Robertson questioned where the statue was located, during a 2011 meeting about the "Southwest Quadrant Renewal", an expansion of Brampton's City Hall. In 2015, Robertson made a submission to council about the statue, requesting that it be given a more prominent place in the community. He suggested that Reeve Bob Williams was told that similar statues would be rotated by the Kwakiutl people, forward facing to welcome visiting tribes, backward facing to discourage their arrival. He suggested that the forward-facing position would symbolize Brampton's welcoming of immigrants.

In 2021, an art conservator recommended that Kwakiutl "be relocated to more suitable location for its long term preservation and appreciation."
