= Whillans =

Whillans may refer to:

- Don Whillans (1933–1985), British rock climber and mountaineer.
- Ken Whillans (1927–1990), Canadian politician and mayor of Brampton, Ontario.
- The Whillans Ice Stream, a glaciological feature of the West Antarctic Ice Sheet.
