= List of mayors of Brampton =

Mayor of Brampton
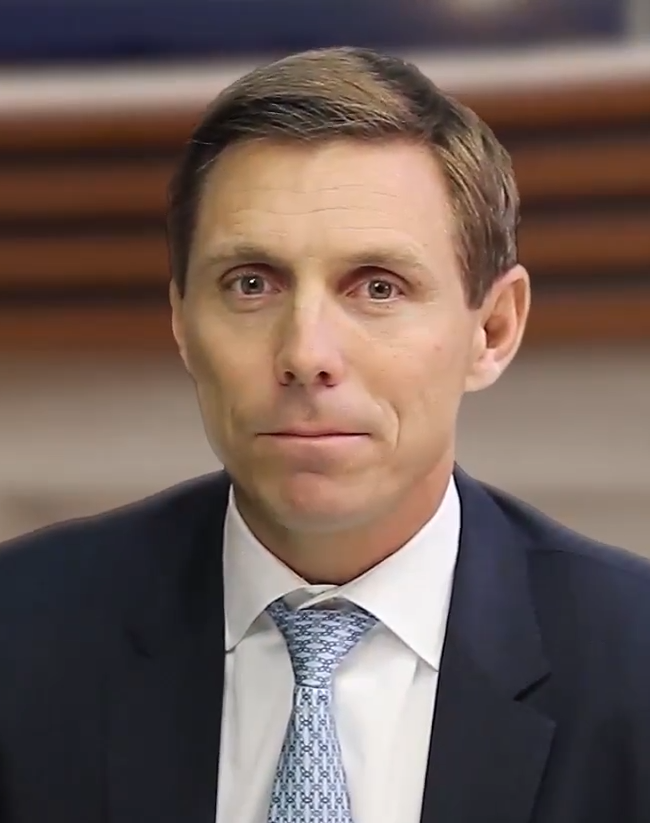
- Incumbent; Patrick Brown since December 1, 2018
- Style: His Worship; Mayor (informal)
- Member of: City Council
- Reports to: Brampton City Council
- Residence: Brampton
- Seat: Brampton City Hall
- Appointer: Directly elected by residents of Brampton
- Term length: Four years, renewable
- Precursor: Reeve of Brampton
- Inaugural holder: John Haggert
- Formation: 1874; 152 years ago
- Salary: $148,371 (2013)
- Website: Office of the Mayor

The mayor of Brampton is head of the executive branch of the Brampton City Council. The current mayor is Patrick Brown.

The following is a list of mayors of Brampton:

== List ==
1. John Haggert, 1874–February 1877
2. James Golding, 1877–1879
3. William A. McCulla, 1880–1882
4. Matthew M. Elliott, 1883–1884
5. Thomas Milner, 1886–1887 (died in office)
6. A. F. Campbell, 1887–1888
7. Thomas Holtby, 1889–1890
8. Manton Treadgold, 1891–1892
9. John T. Mullin, 1893–1894
10. Edwin O. Runians, 1895–1896
11. Edward H. Crandell, 1897–1898
12. William Edwin Milner, 1899–1900
13. Thomas Thauburn, 1901–1902
14. Benjamin Franklin Justin, 1903–1905
15. William Edwin Milner, 1906–June 1907
16. C. A. Irvine, as Acting Mayor, June to July 1907, and as Mayor, July 1907
17. Samuel Charters, August to December 1907
18. James Golding, 1908–1909
19. Thomas Thauburn, 1910–1911
20. Samuel Charters, 1911–1912
21. Thomas W. Duggan, 1912–1913
22. Thomas Mara, 1914–1915
23. A. H. Milner, 1916–1917
24. Louis John Carpenter "L. J. C." Bull, 1918–1919
25. William J. Beatty, 1920–1921
26. John S. Beck, 1922
27. Henry W. Dawson, 1923–1924
28. Franklin W. Wegenast, 1925–1928
29. George Akehurst, 1929–1930
30. Franklin W. Wegenast, 1930–1931
31. George Akehurst, 1931–1932
32. John S. Beck, 1933–1934
33. Ernest W. McCulloch, 1935–1936
34. Wilfred J. Abell, 1937–1938
35. Robert P. Worthy, 1939–1942
36. William Albert Bates, 1943–1944
37. Bartholomew Harper Bull, 1945–1946
38. John Stafford Beck, 1946–1948
39. William Harold Reseau Lawrence, 1949–1951
40. B. Harper Bull, 1952–1954
41. Nance Horwood, 1955–1958 (born Annie Barter)
42. C. Carman Core, 1959–1962
43. Russel E. Prouse, 1963–1966
44. William H. Brydon, 1967–1969
45. James E. Archdekin, 1970–1982
46. Ken Whillans, 1982–September 1990, died in office
47. Paul Beisel, 1990–1991, Whillans' appointed replacement
48. Peter Robertson, 1991–2000
49. Susan Fennell, 2000–2014
50. Linda Jeffrey, December 1, 2014 – December 1, 2018
51. Patrick Brown, December 1, 2018–Present

Note that some publications credit C. A. Irvine as a mayor; he never served in this capacity.

== Roads named after the mayors ==
By neighbourhood:

- Eldomar Heights: Golding Avenue, Milner Road, Beatty Avenue, Core Crescent, Lawrence Crescent
- Flowertown area: Holtby Avenue, Campbell Drive, and Horwood Drive.
- Haggert Avenue, Treadgold Road (Humber West Parkway and Castlemore), McCulla Avenue (near Agnes Taylor P.S.), Elliott Street, Charters Road (Hansen and Vodden), Duggan Drive (Charolais and Chingaucousy), Mara Crescent (at Ken Whillians Drive), Dawson Crescent (Centre at Kennedy), Bates Court (Queen and Chinguacousy), Prouse Drive (Williams Parkway and Centre), Brydon Crescent (Queen and Chinguacousy), Archdekin Drive (at Rutherford Road, near Vodden), Ken Whillans Drive (Vodden to Church St.), Peter Robertson Boulevard (Dixie Road to Torbram Road)
- Abell Drive (Williams Parkway and Kennedy)
- In Peel Village, there is Bartley Bull Parkway (Steeles & Hurontario)

Runians, Thauburn, Irvine, Beck, Wegenast, Akehurst, McCulloch, Biesel and Fennell do not have roads named after them as yet.

The names last names of mayors Mullin, Justin, and Worthy were all rejected at one point or another. There is a Crandall Court, a different spelling than Mayor Crandell.

== Statistics ==
Shortest term as mayor

- S. Charters at four months was preceded and succeeded by William Edwin Milner

Longest term as mayor

- Susan Fennell, fourteen years (as of August 2014)

Mayors who died in office

- Thomas Milner in 1887
- James E. Archdekin in 1982 (died from heart attack)
- Ken Whillans in 1990 (died on vacation)
