= Brampton City Council =

Municipal council in Ontario, Canada

Coordinates: 43.685028°N 79.759433°W

Brampton City Council is the governing body for the City of Brampton, Ontario.

It consists of the mayor of Brampton (currently Patrick Brown), five elected regional councillors and five elected city councillors. Each councillor represents two city wards. The council meets at Brampton City Hall.

== 2026–2030 Council ==
Elected in the 2026 municipal election

Wards	City	Region	Community
Mayor	Patrick Brown		At-large
1 & 5	Rowena Santos	Paul Vicente	Madoc, Brampton North, Brampton West, Northwood Park, Credit Valley
2 & 6	Navjit Kaur Brar	Michael Palleschi	Heart Lake, Snelgrove, Fletcher's Meadow, Mount Pleasant
3 & 4	Dennis Keenan		Fletcher's West, Brampton South, Brampton East, Fletcher's Creek South
7 & 8	Taran Chahal	Rod Power	Bramalea
9 & 10	Harkirat Singh	Sukhman Sangha	Springdale, Castlemore

== 2022–2026 Council ==
Elected in the 2022 municipal election

Wards	City	Region	Community
Mayor	Patrick Brown		At-large
1 & 5	Rowena Santos	Paul Vicente	Madoc, Brampton North, Brampton West, Northwood Park, Credit Valley
2 & 6	Navjit Kaur Brar	Michael Palleschi	Heart Lake, Snelgrove, Fletcher's Meadow, Mount Pleasant
3 & 4	Dennis Keenan	Martin Medeiros	Fletcher's West, Brampton South, Brampton East, Fletcher's Creek South
7 & 8	Rod Power	Pat Fortini	Bramalea
9 & 10	Harkirat Singh	Gurpartap Singh Toor	Springdale

== 2018–2022 Council ==
Elected in the 2018 municipal election

Wards	City	Region	Community
Mayor	Patrick Brown		At-large
1 & 5	Rowena Santos	Paul Vicente	Madoc, Brampton North, Brampton West, Northwood Park, Credit Valley
2 & 6	Doug Whillans	Michael Palleschi	Heart Lake, Snelgrove, Fletcher's Meadow, Mount Pleasant
3 & 4	Jeff Bowman	Martin Medeiros	Fletcher's West, Brampton South, Brampton East, Fletcher's Creek South
7 & 8	Charmaine Williams (until June 2, 2022)	Pat Fortini	Bramalea
9 & 10	Harkirat Singh	Gurpreet Dhillon	Springdale

== 2014–2018 Council ==
Wards	City	Region	Community
Mayor	Linda Jeffrey		At-large
1 & 5	Elaine Moore	Grant Gibson	Madoc, Brampton North, Brampton West, Northwood Park, Credit Valley
2 & 6	Doug Whillans	Michael Palleschi	Heart Lake, Snelgrove, Fletcher's Meadow, Mount Pleasant
3 & 4	Jeff Bowman	Martin Medeiros	Fletcher's West, Brampton South, Brampton East, Fletcher's Creek South
7 & 8	Pat Fortini	Gael Miles	Bramalea
9 & 10	Gurpreet Dhillon	John Sprovieri	Springdale

== 2010–2014 Council ==
- Mayor Susan Fennell
- Wards 1 and 5 – Grant Gibson (city), Elaine Moore (region)
- Wards 2 and 6 – John Hutton (city), Paul Palleschi (region)
- Wards 3 and 4 – Bob Callahan (city), John Sanderson (region)
- Wards 7 and 8 – Sandra Hames (city), Gael Miles (region)
- Wards 9 and 10 – Vicky Dhillon (city), John Sprovieri (region)

== Previous councils ==
=== 1853 ===
- Revee John Lynch
- John Elliot Senior
- John Holmes
- Peleg Howland

=== As of 1874 ===
- Mayor John Haggert
- Reeve Kenneth Chisholm, Deputy-Reeve D. S. Leslie
- East Ward: William McCulla, John W. Cole, John Robertson
- South Ward: James Golding, John Anthony, Thomas Milner
- West Ward: William Milner, Patrick Purcell, S. Williamson
- North Ward: R. H. Lewis, J. W. Beynon, Alexander Pattullo

=== As of 1953 ===
- Mayor B. Harper Bull
- Reeve C. Carman Core, Deputy-Reeve W. G. Thompson
- F. F. Beckett
- J. E. Calvert
- A. Dyball
- E. F. Furness
- Mrs. S. B. Horwood
- Cyril O'Reilly
- City executives: Clerk-Treasurer J. Galway, Assessor Norman E. Hale, Engineer George F. Kimball, Building Inspector Dennis Warren, Water Commissioners John Patterson, E. A. Ingram, Hydro Commissioners W. J. Abell, and W. P. Dale.

=== 2003–2006 ===
Listed as regional councillor, city councillor

- Mayor Susan Fennell
- Ward 1 and 5 – Elaine Moore, Grant Gibson
- Ward 2 and 6 – Paul Palleschi, John Hutton
- Ward 3 and 4 – Susan DiMarco, Bob Callahan
- Ward 7 and 8 – Gael Miles, Sandra Hames
- Ward 9 and 10 – John Sprovieri, Garnett Manning

=== 2006 election ===
The 2006 election was held November 13, 2006; the following people were elected.

- Mayor Susan Fennell
- Ward 1 and 5 – Grant Gibson (Region), Elaine Moore (Region)
- Ward 2 and 6 – John Hutton (City), Paul Palleschi (Region)
- Ward 3 and 4 – Bob Callahan (City), John Sanderson (Region)
- Ward 7 and 8 – Sandra Hames (City), Gael Miles (Region)
- Ward 9 and 10 – Vicky Dhillon (City), John Sprovieri (Region)

== Biographical information on previous councillors ==
Bill Cowie
Cowie unsuccessfully challenged Susan Fennell in the 2003 election. He was the Sesquicentennial co-chair, with Sandra Hames.
Susan DiMarco
Wards 3 & 4 regional, until 2006.
Susan Fennell
Before becoming Mayor, Fennell was a councillor.
Linda Jeffrey
former councillor and Ontario MPP, Mayor elect 2014
Ed Ludlow
Ward 8, 1988-1991. Unsuccessfully ran for wards 2 and 6 in the 2003 election. Age 65 as of December 2006, guilty of molesting four boys between 1971 and 1975, when he was master instructor at Tora Martial Arts. Many more victims have yet to come forward
Garnett Manning
Wards 9 and 10, 2003–2006. Lost to Vicky Dhillon. In May 2006, he won the African Canadian Achievement Award (ACAA) for Excellence in Politics.
Peter Robertson
Before becoming Mayor, Robertson was a councillor.
