= Brampton South (provincial electoral district) =

Provincial electoral district in Ontario, Canada

Coordinates: 43.656°N 79.757°W

Ontario electoral district
- Location in Brampton

Provincial electoral district
- Legislature: Legislative Assembly of Ontario
MPP
Prabmeet Sarkaria
Progressive Conservative
- District created: 2015
- First contested: 2018
- Last contested: 2025

Demographics
- Population (2016): 121,185
- Electors (2018): 77,279
- Area (km²): 48
- Pop. density (per km²): 2,524.7
- Census division: Peel
- Census subdivision: Brampton

Brampton South is a provincial electoral district in Ontario, Canada. It was created prior to the 1987 election from part of Brampton. It was abolished in 1999 into Bramalea—Gore—Malton—Springdale, Brampton Centre, Brampton West—Mississauga. It existed for the 1987, 1990, and 1995 elections. For the 2018 election, it was re-created from Brampton West.

== Boundaries ==
In 1987, the boundaries consisted of the city of Brampton south of the following line (from east to west): from the city limits going east along Highway 7 to Queen Street East, then west to Kennedy Road, then north along Kennedy Road to Vodden Street, then west to Main Street, then north along Main Street and Highway 10 to Highway 7 and then west to the city limits.

== Members of Provincial Parliament ==
Brampton South
Assembly	Years	Member	Party
Riding created from Brampton
34th	1987–1990	Robert Callahan	Liberal
35th	1990–1995	Robert Callahan	Liberal
36th	1995–1999	Tony Clement	Progressive Conservative
Riding dissolved into Bramalea—Gore—Malton—Springdale, Brampton Centre, and Brampton West—Mississauga
Riding re-created from Brampton West
42nd	2018–2022	Prabmeet Sarkaria	Progressive Conservative
43rd	2022–present	Prabmeet Sarkaria	Progressive Conservative

== Election results ==
=== 2018-present ===
Winning party in each polling division of Brampton South at the 2025 Ontario general election

2025 Ontario general election
Party	Candidate	Votes	%	±%
Progressive Conservative	Prabmeet Sarkaria	15,379	52.53	+7.15
Liberal	Bhavik Parikh	9,530	32.55	+4.73
New Democratic	Rajni Sharma	2,413	8.24	–10.90
New Blue	Johnny Nolan	1,042	3.56	+0.15
Green	Rajinder Boyal	911	3.11	–0.48
Total valid votes		29,275	99.40	
Total rejected, unmarked and declined ballots		176	0.60	+0.21
Turnout		29,451	36.10	+0.30
Eligible voters		81,573		
Progressive Conservative hold		Swing		▲1.21
Source: Elections Ontario

Winning party in each polling division of Brampton South at the 2022 Ontario general election

2022 Ontario general election
Party	Candidate	Votes	%	±%	Expenditures
Progressive Conservative	Prabmeet Sarkaria	12,980	45.38	+4.37	$107,983
Liberal	Marilyn Raphael	7,957	27.82	+8.92	$43,224
New Democratic	Andria Barrett	5,475	19.14	–14.70	$71,066
Green	Ines Espinoza	1,028	3.59	–0.26	$982
New Blue	Mike Mol	974	3.41	–	$8,531
None of the Above	Mehdi Pakzad	188	0.66	–	$403
Total valid votes/expense limit		28,602	99.61	–	$112,273
Total rejected, unmarked and declined ballots		112	0.39	–0.72	
Turnout		28,714	35.81	–14.14	
Eligible voters		80,195			
Progressive Conservative hold		Swing		▼2.28	
Source: Elections Ontario

2018 Ontario general election
Party	Candidate	Votes	%
Progressive Conservative	Prabmeet Sarkaria	15,652	41.01
New Democratic	Paramjit Gill	12,919	33.85
Liberal	Sukhwant Thethi	7,212	18.89
Green	Lindsay Falt	1,472	3.86
Libertarian	Brian Watson	363	0.95
Trillium	John Grant	337	0.88
Freedom	Ted Harlson	214	0.56
Total valid votes		38,169	98.89
Total rejected, unmarked and declined ballots		429	1.11
Turnout		38,598	49.95
Eligible voters		77,279	
Progressive Conservative pickup new district.			
Source: Elections Ontario

2014 general election redistributed results
Party	Vote	%
Liberal	13,387	44.69
Progressive Conservative	7,792	26.01
New Democratic	6,562	21.91
Others	1,284	4.29
Green	930	3.11

=== 1987–1999 ===
1995 Ontario general election
Party	Candidate	Votes	%	±%
Progressive Conservative	Tony Clement	21,859	49.67	+21.17
Liberal	Bob Callahan	15,237	34.62	+2.31
New Democratic	Paul Ledgister	5,676	12.90	–18.35
Family Coalition	Bernie Cissek	1,011	2.30	–3.98
Natural Law	Maxim Newby	229	0.52	–
Total valid votes		44,012	99.00	
Total rejected, unmarked and declined ballots		446	1.00	–0.76
Turnout		44,458	59.78	+0.43
Eligible voters		74,364		
Progressive Conservative gain from Liberal		Swing		+9.43
Source: Elections Ontario

1990 Ontario general election
Party	Candidate	Votes	%	±%
Liberal	Bob Callahan	12,918	32.31	–20.27
New Democratic	John Scheer	12,494	31.25	+14.26
Progressive Conservative	Margaret McCallion	11,395	28.50	+8.62
Family Coalition	Rodolfo Nonato	2,511	6.28	–2.37
Communist	James R. Bridgewood	667	1.67	+0.88
Total valid votes		39,985	98.24	
Total rejected, unmarked and declined ballots		718	1.76	+1.29
Turnout		40,703	59.36	+4.21
Eligible voters		68,574		
Liberal hold		Swing		–17.27
Source: Elections Ontario

1987 Ontario general election
Party	Candidate	Votes	%
Liberal	Bob Callahan	17,913	52.58
Progressive Conservative	Frank Russell	6,772	19.88
New Democratic	Paul Ledgister	5,786	16.98
Family Coalition	Don Best	2,946	8.65
Communist	James R. Bridgewood	268	0.79
Libertarian	Garnet C. Brace	225	0.66
Independent	Malcolm Cook	158	0.46
Total valid votes		34,068	99.53
Total rejected ballots		161	0.47
Turnout		34,229	55.15
Eligible voters		62,065	
Liberal pickup new district.			
Source: Elections Ontario

== See also ==
- List of Ontario provincial electoral districts
- Canadian provincial electoral districts
