= Ken Whillans =

Kenneth Gilmour 'Ken' Whillans

46th Mayor of Brampton
- In office 1982 – September 1990
- Preceded by: James E. Archdekin
- Succeeded by: Paul Biesel

Personal details
- Born: 8 August 1927 Ottawa, Ontario
- Died: 24 August 1990 (aged 63) Prince Edward Island
- Party: Progressive Conservative
- Spouse: Edna Whillans
- Children: 3

Kenneth Gilmour 'Ken' Whillans (8 August 1927 – 24 August 1990) served as Mayor of the City of Brampton from 1982 to 1990.

== Personal life and family ==
Whillans was born in Ottawa. He had a twin brother, Don. Son Doug Whillans has run for public office on multiple ballots, was successful in 2014 and now serves as a City Councillor for Wards 2 and 6.

== As alderman ==
Whillans led efforts to revamp Citizens Advisory Committees while in office as an alderman.

== Mayor of Brampton ==
Whillans was elected mayor in 1982 following the death of James Archdekin, who died while in office of a heart attack. Whillans ran against Terry Miller in the two-man race. Leo Archdekin was favoured as a candidate by the local media but chose not to run.

The same election saw five aldermen win their seats by acclamation.

== Possible replacement for Davis as MPP ==
With Premier of Ontario William G. Davis announcing that he would not seek re-election in the 1985 Ontario general election, Whillans considered seeking the Progressive Conservative nomination in the Brampton riding against Bob Callahan, an alderman on Brampton city council since 1969, who had won the Liberal party nomination. Future Brampton mayor Peter Robertson would lose the nomination to Jeff Rice, despite being favoured in polls.

Rice ultimately lost to Callahan (45.6%) in the 1985 Ontario general election.

== Death ==
Whillans drowned while vacationing with his family in Prince Edward Island, on 24 August 1990. He was replaced as mayor by Alderman Paul Biesel. Biesel stood for re-election, but later dropped out of the running.

== Legacy ==
Whillans has several landmarks named in his honour in Brampton and in adjacent Caledon:

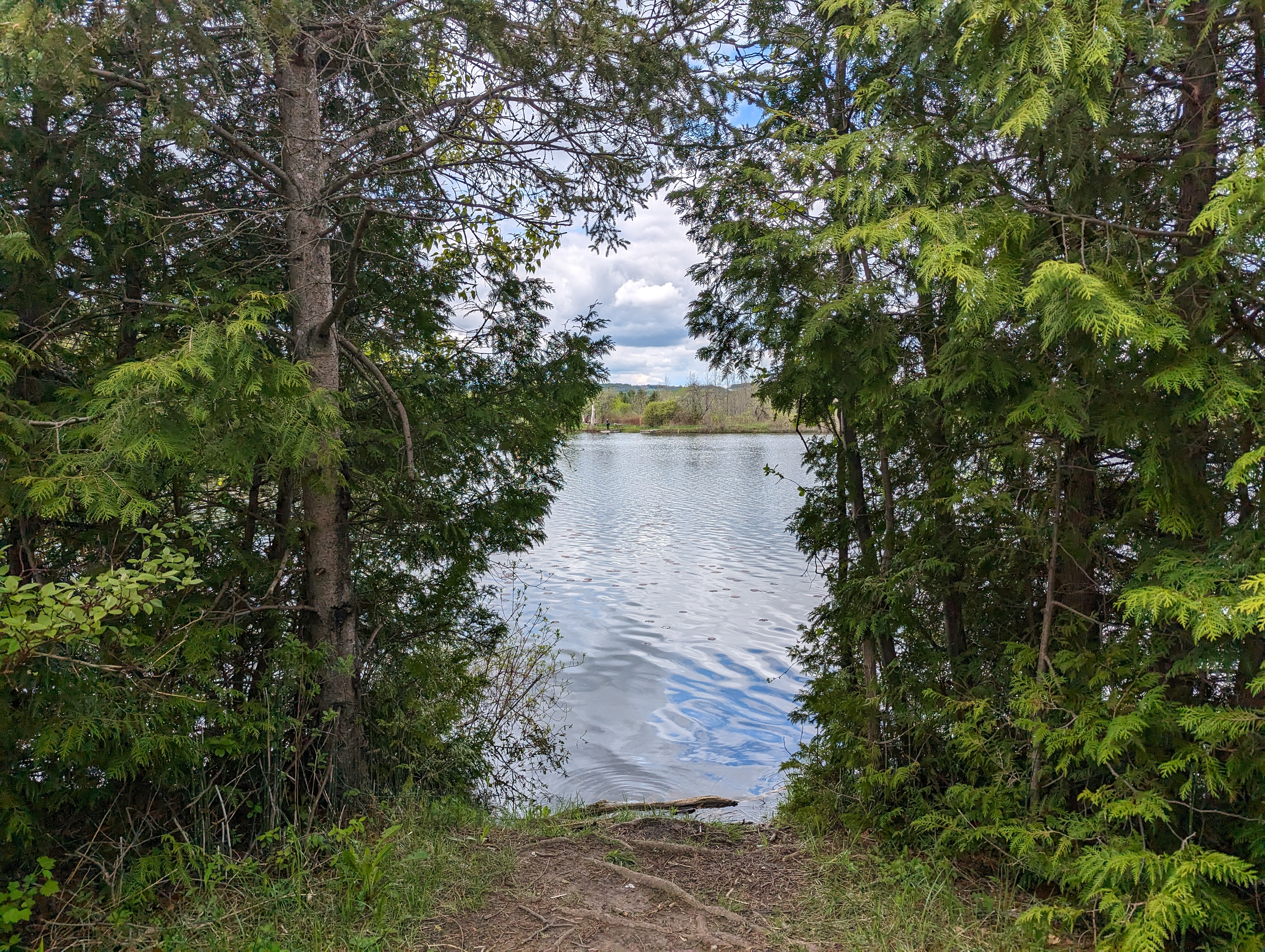
Pond at Ken Whillans Resource Management Area

- The Ken Whillans Resource Management Area which is a provincially significant wetland swamp stretching for 48 km from Terra Cotta to Palgrave, from the Caledon Trailway to the Credit River, on the eastern boundary of Inglewood village within the town of Caledon, north of Brampton.
- Ken Whillans Square, located at 2 Wellington Street West adjacent to Brampton City Hall, and houses the Brampton Cenotaph.
- Ken Whillans Drive runs parallel to the Etobicoke Creek Trail between Vodden Street and Church Street.
- The Whillans Lake off of Highway 10 north of Brampton near Caledon.
- The 'Butterfly' is a 4 ft x 6 ft painting on view in Brampton City Hall. The butterfly in this work is symbolic of the late Ken Whillans; if the viewer blocks out the butterfly from their vision, the entire mood of the painting apparently changes, signifying the loss felt by the citizens of Brampton.
- Whillans Gate is a 122 unit development built in 1991. It is located near the corner of Queen and Kennedy Streets in Brampton.
