= Brampton (provincial electoral district) =

Former provincial electoral district

Brampton was a provincial electoral district in Ontario, Canada, that was represented in the Legislative Assembly of Ontario from 1975 to 1987.

It was represented from 1975 to 1985 by Premier Bill Davis, a Progressive Conservative, and Bob Callahan, a Liberal.

== Members of Provincial Parliament ==
This riding elected the following members of Provincial Parliament:

Brampton North
Assembly	Years	Member	Party
Riding created from Peel
30th	1975–1977	Bill Davis	Progressive Conservative
31st	1977–1981	Bill Davis	Progressive Conservative
32nd	1981–1985	Bill Davis	Progressive Conservative
33rd	1985–1987	Bob Callahan	Liberal
Riding dissolved into Brampton South and Brampton North

== Election results ==
1985 Ontario general election
Party	Candidate	Votes	%	±%
Liberal	Bob Callahan	25,656	45.62	+22.60
Progressive Conservative	Jeff Rice	21,239	37.77	–23.46
New Democratic	Terry Gorman	8,313	14.78	–0.01
Communist	James R. Bridgewood	531	0.94	–0.01
Independent	Dave Duquette	500	0.89	–
Total valid votes		56,239	99.47	
Total rejected ballots		300	0.53	–0.28
Turnout		56,539	55.78	+5.15
Eligible voters		101,366		
Liberal gain from Progressive Conservative		Swing		+23.03
Source: Elections Ontario

1981 Ontario general election
Party	Candidate	Votes	%	±%
Progressive Conservative	Bill Davis	24,973	61.23	+9.31
Liberal	Bob Callahan	9,391	23.02	+2.02
New Democratic	David M. Moulton	6,034	14.79	–11.37
Communist	James R. Bridgewood	390	0.96	+0.39
Total valid votes		40,788	99.19	
Total rejected ballots		332	0.81	+0.43
Turnout		41,120	50.63	–13.53
Eligible voters		81,215		
Progressive Conservative hold		Swing		+3.65
Source: Elections Ontario

1977 Ontario general election
Party	Candidate	Votes	%	±%
Progressive Conservative	Bill Davis	19,641	51.92	+8.26
New Democratic	John Deamer	9,897	26.16	–2.60
Liberal	Bob Callahan	7,948	21.01	–5.31
Communist	John MacLennan	216	0.57	+0.17
League for Socialist Action	Therese J. Faubert	86	0.23	–
North American Labour Party	Fred Haight	44	0.12	–
Total valid votes		37,832	99.62	
Total rejected ballots		143	0.38	+0.06
Turnout		37,975	64.16	–7.87
Eligible voters		59,187		
Progressive Conservative hold		Swing		+5.43
Source: Elections Ontario

1975 Ontario general election
Party	Candidate	Votes	%
Progressive Conservative	Bill Davis	16,432	43.66
New Democratic	John Deamer	10,824	28.76
Liberal	Bill Agnew	9,906	26.32
Social Credit	A. Richard Bullock	258	0.69
Communist	John MacLennan	152	0.40
League for Socialist Action	Robert L. Simms	65	0.17
Total valid votes		37,637	99.68
Total rejected ballots		121	0.32
Turnout		37,758	72.03
Eligible voters		52,419	
Progressive Conservative pickup new district.			
Source: Elections Ontario
