= Susan Fennell =

Politician, women's hockey commissioner

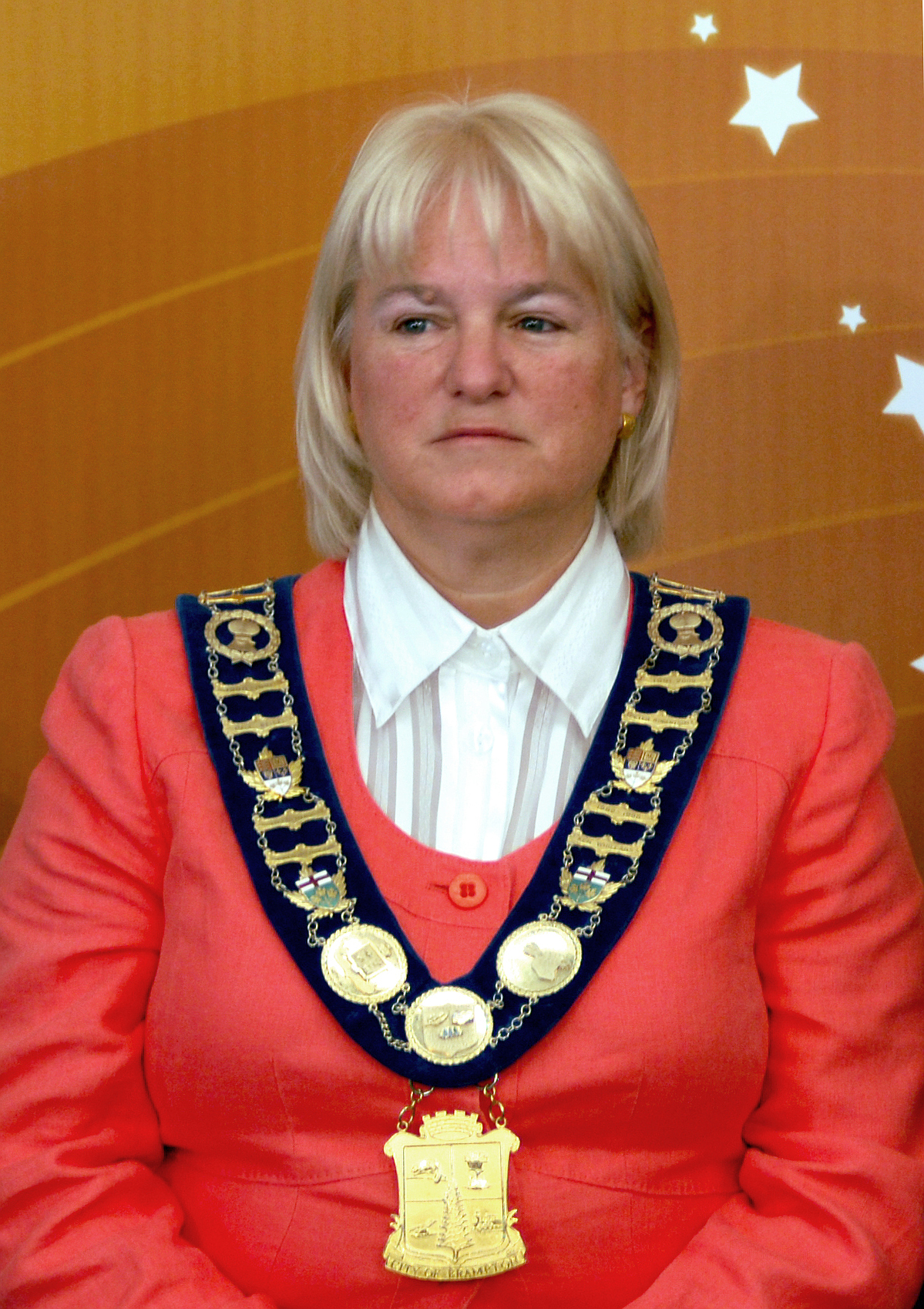
- Fennell in 2008

49th Mayor of Brampton
- In office 2000–2014
- Preceded by: Peter Robertson
- Succeeded by: Linda Jeffrey

Brampton City Councillor for Ward 3
- In office 1988–2000
- Preceded by: John Shadrach

Personal details
- Born: 1953 (age 72–73) Saint-Laurent, Quebec
- Education: University of Toronto (BSc)

Susan Fennell is a Canadian politician, who served as the mayor of Brampton, Ontario from 2000 to 2014. She was also the founder and commissioner of the National Women's Hockey League. In 2021, the City of Brampton named the Susan Fennell Sportsplex after her.

== Background ==
In 1953, Susan Fennell was born Susan Biefer in Saint-Laurent, a borough of Montreal, Quebec. She completed an Honours Bachelor of Science in environmental science from Erindale College at the University of Toronto in 1977. She and her husband John have two adult children, Michael and Joey. Before entering politics she worked for 11 years for Toledo Scale.

== Career ==
Fennell's first foray into politics was with her 1988 election to Brampton City Council for Ward 3. That same year she was first elected to the Board of Governors of Sheridan College, where she served as one of the directors until 1995. During her time as a city councillor, Fennell was actively involved in several committees, including those for Economic Development and Official Plan Review. This period also saw Fennell active on the Airport Tri-Municipal Committee, the Brampton Board of Trade, and the Downtown Business Improvement Area.

In 1991, Fennell was elected to Peel Regional Council to represent Wards 3 and 4. Her first term as a regional councillor saw her chair the Brampton Budget Committee and saw the first zero-tax increase in Peel Region's history in 1993. During her stint at the regional council, Fennell also chaired the Public Works Committee and the Economic Development Committee. She was also involved in the governing council of the Board of Trade and the Highway 427 Extension Committee.

In the 1993 federal election she ran as the Progressive Conservative candidate in the Brampton riding, finishing third.

Hockey commissioner

Fennell was instrumental in the creation of the National Women's Hockey League, the premier women's hockey league in North America. She served as its founding commissioner from its inception in 1999 until her retirement in July 2006.

=== As mayor ===
In 2000, Fennell defeated three-term incumbent Peter Robertson for the Brampton mayoralty. She was re-elected in 2003, defeating councillor Bill Cowie by a 28% margin. Fennell was re-elected to a third term in 2006 with 79.85% of the vote, defeating the nearest competitor by a 61% margin. In 2010, Fennell was elected to her fourth term with 50.68% of the vote.

She acted to protect Brampton's position on Peel Regional Council, including negotiating with the designated provincial facilitator, Justice George Adams. However, the Ontario Legislature voted against the recommendation and instead increased the seats on Peel Regional Council in Mississauga's favour instead of allotting more in Brampton's favour to provide for future population growth in Brampton as was recommended by the provincial facilitator.

While mayor, Fennell twice served as chair of the Federation of Canadian Municipalities (FCM) Infrastructure and Transportation Committee, as well as being a part of the Federal Big City Mayor's Caucus (BCMC). In 2007 she was elected chair of the FCM Federal Ontario Municipal Caucus and continues to serve in this role after her re-election at the 2012 FCM AGM in Saskatoon. She is also a member of the Peel Regional Police Services Board, the Large Urban Mayors Caucus of Ontario (LUMCO), the Greater Toronto Marketing Alliance., and the GO-Transit Board.

During Fennell's tenure as mayor, Brampton became debt free and also was assigned a Triple AAA Credit Rating. In 2007, Brampton was designated an Internationally Safe Community, by the World Health Organization, one of only 10 cities designated in North America. In 2007, Brampton was named a finalist in the World Leadership Forum, for best led city in the category of town planning.

In 2008, Fennell called for an environment master plan, and created the Environment Committee of Council, with citizens, academia and business involved.

City projects during her time as mayor included the Rose Theatre, Flower City Seniors Centre, Chinguacousy Park Skateboard Park, Cassie Campbell Community Centre, Brampton Soccer Centre, Full renovation of Earnscliffe Recreation Centre and Century Gardens and Züm rapid transit.

In 2014, in the wake of controversy concerning some of her expenses and financial record-keeping, she lost a significant amount of support. Subsequently, she was defeated in the 2014 Brampton mayoral election by a wide margin, coming in third place.

=== Controversies ===
Fennell received $3,200 USD in donations from tobacco giant Philip Morris International in 2009.

Fennell is accused of secretly and illegally lowering her own salary in 2013 to avoid, for the second consecutive year, being publicised as the highest-paid mayor in Canada; Brampton is the ninth-largest city. Mayor Fennell chose to voluntarily not accept the council-assigned pay, thereby lowering her salary by 20 percent. Fennell voluntarily removed a Marketing, Advertising and Promotion Account ($60K/year) from her 2014 budget. Council colleagues attacked various budget items, including expenditures for a 'vehicle' and a 'contract driving service, for 10 years'.

A company "run by a close friend of hers" is under investigation for over $100,000 in non-competitive municipal contracts. The 'internal investigation' found the company had been doing business with the City of Brampton years before Fennell became mayor and business done with the company had no interaction from the mayor. The business received orders based solely on price, delivery and client satisfaction.

In September 2014, Fennell used threats of legal action against fellow councillors, the Toronto Star, the city's integrity commissioner and auditor Deloitte to delay a city council meeting which was to discuss a major spending scandal. As the parties involved needed an opportunity to seek legal advice, regardless of the merit (or spuriousness) of the claims, this tactic served to defer a key debate preventing council ruling on inappropriate spending in the last sitting of the Brampton council prior to the 2014 election.

A Deliotte audit found that Fennell and her staff violated spending rules 266 times over 7 years, with a further 79 transactions that may have violated spending rules.

Fennell overturned a council decision in late 2014 that deprived her of salary and ordered that she repay taxpayers for using an expensive car service. Days before the 2014 municipal election, Arbitrator Janet Leiper ruled that Fennell violated expense rules in just two occasions, according to Fennell.

== Honours ==
Fennell is an Honorary Member of the Royal Canadian Legion Branch 15, an Honorary Member of the Brampton Kiwanis and Zonta clubs, and has been honoured with Rotary International's Paul Harris Fellowship. In 2005 she was named an honorary member of the William Osler Health Centre Board of Directors. She is also a recipient of the Queen Elizabeth II Silver Jubilee Medal. and has been presented the Boy Scouts "Lord Baden Powell" Medal.

In 2006 she was inducted into the City of Brampton Sports Hall of Fame in the "Builder" category for her role in the creation and growth of the NWHL. In December 2008, Mayor Fennell was presented an honorary fifth degree black belt in Tai Kwon Do, presented by Grand Master Ken Cheung.
