= Brampton Board of Trade =

- Type: Chamber of commerce
- Legal status: Non-profit
- Headquarters: 36 Queen Street East, Suite 101, Brampton, ON L6V 1A2; Canada
- Coordinates: 43°41′13″N 79°45′33″W
- Region served: Ontario
- CEO: Todd Letts
- Board of directors: Chair: Donna Fagon-Pascal, Vice President Human Resources, Communication and Public Relations, Dynacare
- Website: www.bramptonbot.com
- Formerly called: Brampton-Chinguacousy Chamber of Commerce

The Brampton Board of Trade is a business organization founded in Brampton, Ontario, in 1887. It engages in government lobbying, member discounts, and networking. It previously organized the Brampton Santa Claus Parade (1985-2017).

Joe Spina served as an Ontario MPP from 1999 to 2003, after his time as BBOT President.

The Board's archival fonds is at the Region of Peel Archives, with records from 1909 to 1919 and 1947 to 1973.

== History ==
- 1887 - founded and lapsed shortly after election of officers
- 1890 - founded
- 1897 - ceases operations
- 1903 - founded
- 1921, 1923–1947 - dormant
- 1947 - revived as Brampton Chamber of Commerce
- 1964 - amends name to Brampton and District Chamber of Commerce
- 1974 - The Regional Government was formed and re-incorporated as The Brampton Board of Trade. Operated the motor vehicle licensing bureau from 1974-2015.
- 1985 - Revived the Santa Claus Parade as a nationally acclaimed night parade.
- 1997 - Won Ontario Chamber of Commerce award for communications.
- 1997 - Welcomed Maria Britto as the first female president.
- 2000 - Assisted with the recruitment of Chrysler, Brampton’s largest employer at the time.
- 2004 - Successfully advocated for the extension of Highway 410 through Brampton.
- 2004 - Launched the “Save Our Hospital” campaign and continued healthcare advocacy for Peel Memorial.
- 2014 - International trade advocacy and market development are supported by the mission to Turkey.
- 2015 - Launched the Prosperity Roundtable and agenda to boost key economic drivers.
- 2015 - Became a founding member of Canadian Global Cities Council, a coalition of business communities in Canada’s nine largest markets.
- 2016 - Recognized as #1 business association and networking organization in Brampton.
- 2016 - Became a founding member of Canada’s Innovation Corridor Business Council.
- 2017 - Joined World Trade Centre – Toronto’s first mission to the United Arab Emirates.
- 2017 - Established Top 40 Under 40 initiative to showcase Brampton’s talented workforce.
- 2018 - Successfully advocated for reducing city property tax increases (frozen 2018-2020).
- 2019 - Re-accredited with the standard of excellence by the national accreditation council (with distinction).
- 2019 - Hosted Chamber Executives of Ontario Conference.
- 2019 - CEO Todd Letts was named to Governing Council, World Chambers Federation of the International Chamber of Commerce.
- 2020 - Collaborated with Mayor’s Task Force on Economic Recovery to provide essential business guidance through global pandemic.
- 2020 - Advocated for Two-Way, All-Day GO train service which led to our CEO’s appointment to the Minister of Transportation’s Business Advisory Council on Transit in the Innovation Corridor.
- 2021 - The Brampton Board of Trade held the 4th Annual Canada's Innovation Corridor Summit, exploring key issues associated with the theme of Disruption.
- 2022 - The Brampton Board of Trade was selected to host the Ontario Chamber of Commerce's 2022 AGM & Convention. This event represents one of the most significant opportunities for business leaders from across the province to network with peers, debate Ontario business policy issues, and shape our future advocacy agenda.

== Programs ==
=== Speakers ===
The organization has hosted many notable speakers, most recently hosting Party leaders prior to the 2022 Provincial election: Steven Del Duca (Ontario Liberals), Mike Schreiner (Green Party of Ontario) and Andrea Horwath (Ontario NDP). Each February, the Board of Trade hosts the State of the City, where the Mayor of Brampton and Chair of the Board share their priorities for the year ahead. As part of the View from the Top series, Brampton Board of Trade CEO Todd Letts spoke with Dr. Mohamed Lachemi Professor, President and Vice-Chancellor at Ryerson University on October 21, 2021. In April 2021, Todd Letts and Chair Michelle McCollum hosted Joe Jackman and Bob Peacock of Almag Aluminum to speak about succession planning and overcoming adversity and business challenges. The Board also hosts Minister visits, hosting the Honourable Steve Clark Minister of Municipal Affairs and Housing, who was joined by the Honourable Prabmeet Sarkaria and MPP Amarjot Sandhu, Parliamentary Assistant to the Minister of Infrastructure on October 27. 2021, prior to that they hosted the Honourable Omar Alghabra, Minister of Transport on April 29, 2021. They have previously hosted federal Small Business Minister Tony Abbott, Chrysler Canada CEO Reid Bigland, Ontario Premier Bill Davis, Canadian Alliance party leader Stockwell Day (who announced a timetable for merging with Progressive Conservative party), Prime Minister Stephen Harper, Ontario Premier Mike Harris, Chrysler Canada president Yves Landry, Reform Party leader Preston Manning, Ontario Minister of Agriculture William "Bill" Newman, Minister of Small Business and Export Promotion Mary Ng, Ontario Premier David Peterson, federal Agriculture Minister Eugene Whelan, and Minister of Finance Michael Wilson.

=== Policy positions ===
The Board supported the Charlottetown Accord (1992).

The Brampton Board of Trade supports regional public transit infrastructure, including extending the Hazel McCallion (formerly Hurontario) Line north onto Main Street in Brampton and the full implementation of Two-Way, All Day GO (TWADG) Train service.

The Brampton Board of Trade supports building the GTA West Transportation Corridor, better known as Highway 413.

The Brampton Board of Trade supports increasing the footprint of the post-secondary sector in Brampton. This includes augmenting current offerings (such as those of Algoma University, Sheridan College and Toronto Metropolitan University) as well as pursuing new opportunities (such as the relocation of the University of Guelph-Humber campus).

The Brampton Board of Trade supports efforts to increase uptake of COVID-19 vaccines, including on-site vaccination clinics at major industrial employers at the height of the pandemic.

The Brampton Board of Trade supports the implementation of affordable childcare.

The Brampton Board of Trade supports urgent solutions to the crisis in the housing market, including interventions such as ending exclusionary zoning to build the “missing middle” by increasing the supply of multi-unit complexes in areas not zoned for them.

The Brampton Board of Trade supports an engaging municipal budget process that includes proactive stakeholder consultation, as well as disclosure of relevant documents related to capital expenditures and capital planning well in advance. The Board has also taken the position that longer-range capital forecasting will strengthen the city’s hand in competing for capital funding from senior orders of government.

The Brampton Board of Trade supports the investment necessary to complete and fully unlock the potential of Riverwalk.

The Brampton Board of Trade supports increasing the number of immigrants admitted under given categories based on workforce needs, and has called on government to work together to more quickly recognize international credentials in fields experiencing labour shortages in Ontario.

The Brampton Board of Trade has called on the federal and provincial governments to work together to break down barriers to interprovincial trade, and has called on the federal government to redouble efforts to secure free trade agreements with emerging economies such as India.

=== Brampton Santa Claus Parade ===
Brampton's Santa Claus parade stopped in the mid-1970s. In 1985, the Brampton Board of Trade started planning a Santa Claus parade for 1986; simultaneously, the Jaycees were intending to start a parade in 1987. With City co-operation, the Board's parade launched in 1986, with Jaycee assistance in marshalling. That year's program was announced to include forty community entrants, sponsored by companies, but ended up with 52 units. In recent years, it has included over 100 units. The parade moved to a "night parade" format in 1995.

The parade route has expanded from Vodden to south of Wellington Street (1986) to Sproule to south of Elgin Street. Temporarily it is on Bramalea Road because of construction in downtown Brampton.

The parade is always on the Third Saturday in November

The Board claims an in-person attendance of 160,000 (2012). It claims to be the largest single-day event in the Regional Municipality of Peel, and the largest night parade in Canada. The Canadian Chamber of Commerce has named the parade as the Best Community Lighted Parade in Canada.

The program was broadcast on Rogers TV Brampton, which claimed viewership of over 250,000 between live and repeat broadcasts.

The Board of Trade stopped hosting the parade in 2017, and it is now run by The Brampton Santa Claus Parade Committee Inc.

== People ==
=== Chairpersons of the BBOT ===
From 1887 to 2011, Chairs were referred to as Presidents of the BBOT.

- 1887, K. Chisholm
- 1890–1896, E.O. Runians
- 1904–1906, John H. Boulter
- 1906–1907, T.W. Duggan, later mayor (from Dale Estates Limited)
- 1907, E.S. Anderson
- 1907–1911, G.L. Williams
- 1911–1914, John H. Boulter
- 1914–1917, R.H. Pringle
- 1917–1919, F. W. Wegenast, later mayor
- 1919–1920, G.W. McFarland
- 1922, James Martin
- 1948–1949, F. Gordon Umphrey
- 1950, Cecil Carscadden
- 1951, William Robinson
- 1952, Frank Richardson
- 1953, C.G. Patterson
- 1954, Joe Racine
- 1955, Emerson McKinney
- 1956, William Watson
- 1957, William Coupar
- 1958, William Robinson
- 1959, Lloyd Denby
- 1960, Stan Stonehouse
- 1960–1961, Harold Knight
- 1961–1962, Cecil Chinn
- 1962–1963, Edward Ching
- 1963–1964, Sam Charters
- 1964–1965, Douglas Brown
- 1965–1966, Gordon Vivian
- 1966–1967, Stan Eisel
- 1967–1968, J.A. Carroll
- 1968–1969, Ronald Rider
- 1969–1970, Richard Boyle
- 1970–1971, R.C. Harvey
- 1971–1972, Hank Sawatsky
- 1972–1973, Peter Montgomery
- 1973–1974, Watson Kennedy
- 1974–1975, G.W. (Joe) Harley
- 1975–1976, A.D.K. Mackenzie
- 1976–1977, Harry Lockwood
- 1977–1978, Don Crawford
- 1978–1979, John Logan (from John Logan Chevrolet-Oldsmobile)
- 1979–1980, Terry Champ
- 1980–1981, Jim Phair
- 1981–1982, Marty Hughes
- 1982–1983, Earnie Mitchell
- 1983–1984, Keith Coulter
- 1984–1985, Bruce Carruthers
- 1985–1986, Robert Bell
- 1986–1987, Dennis Cole
- 1987–1988, Lou Duggan
- 1988–1989, Wally Rudensky
- 1989–1990, Joe Spina, later an MPP
- 1990–1991, Al Brannon
- 1991, Lewis Wagg
- 1991–1992, Jack Coughlin
- 1992–1993, Jim Inglis
- 1993–1994, Paul Howlett
- 1994–1995, Blaine Mitton
- 1995–1996, Bob Nutbrown
- 1996–1997, Bryan Dawson
- 1997–1998, Maria Britto
- 1998–1999, Ken Hay
- 1999–2000, Heather Picken (from Lawrence, Lawrence, Stevenson LLP)
- 2000–2001, Adam Nowak
- 2001–2002, John Sanderson
- 2002–2003, Robert Peacock
- 2003–2004, Michael Collins
- 2004–2005, Mitch Robinson (from ScotiaMcLeod Inc.)
- 2005–2006, Michael Luchenski (from Lawrence, Lawrence, Stevenson LLP)
- 2006–2007, Wayne Waters
- 2007–2008, Linda Ford
- 2008–2009, Carman McClelland
- 2009–2010, F-Charles Waud (from WaudWare Incorporated)
- 2010–2011, Stephen Rhodes
- 2012, Jim Schembri
- 2013, Glenn Williams
- 2014, Susan Crawford
- 2015, Jaipaul Massey-Singh
- 2016, Badar Shamim
- 2017, Evan Moore
- 2018, Heather Strati
- 2019, Manpreet Mann
- 2020, Vanessa White
- 2021, Donna Fagon-Pascal

=== Brampton Business Person of the Year ===
- 1978: Emerson McKinney
- 1979: Charles Armstrong
- 1980: William Pickett
- 1981: Carl Dalli
- 1982: Max Rice
- 1983: G.W. (Joe) Harley
- 1984: Marie and Joseph Colbacchin
- 1985: John Logan
- 1986: John Mills
- 1987: David Dickson M.D.
- 1988: Harry Lockwood
- 1989: Donald Crawford
- 1990: Robert Bell
- 1991: Ruth Sharpe
- 1992: Jeff Kerbel
- 1993: John Cutruzzola
- 1994: Al Brannon
- 1995: Bill Graham
- 1996: Lou Duggan
- 1997: Bob May
- 1998: Roger Peddle
- 1999: Ignat Kaneff
- 2000: Mike Cuttle
- 2001: Chris Butcher
- 2002: Maria Britto
- 2003: John Sanderson
- 2004: Bryan Dawson
- 2005: Bill Strachan
- 2006: Scott Goodison
- 2007: Neil Davis
- 2008: George Chiu
- 2009: Doug Munro
- 2010: Vlad Stritesky
- 2011: Rob Filken
- 2012: Linda Ford
- 2013: David Sharpe
- 2014–15: Bob Peacock
- 2016: Heather Picken
- 2017: Mohamad Fakih
- 2018: Robert Bedard
- 2019: Richard Prouse, lawyer, Prouse, Dash & Crouch, LLP
- 2020: William E. Johnston, Bramgate Automotive Inc. president
- 2021: Vito Ciciretto, President & CEO, Dynacare
- 2022: Heather Strati, Partner, Deloitte

=== Lifetime members of BBoT ===
- Robert Bell
- J. Bruce Carruthers C.A.
- Keith Coulter
- Donald R. Crawford
- G.W. (Joe) Harley
- Harry Lockwood
- John Logan
- Ron Rider
- Peter Robertson
- Ruth Sharpe
- Gordon Smith
