= Simon Charlie =

Simon Charlie or Hunumetse' (1919–2005) was a Canadian totem sculptor of the Cowichan Tribes (Quw'utsun) of the Coast Salish nation, known for his wood carvings. He was born in Koksilah, on Vancouver Island, close to Duncan, British Columbia.

== Carving works ==
He was trained by famous Kwakwaka'wakw totem artist Henry Hunt, at the Provincial Museum of British Columbia, but though as Hunt he carved Totem poles, which were not traditionally used by the Coast Salish people (who usually carved mainly house posts with human figures), Charlie worked in the Salish carving tradition rather than Hunt's Kwakwaka'wakw tradition. He was described as having "deep knowledge of the language, history, oral traditions, and ceremonial practices" of the Cowichan people.

Though he was known for his adherence to the Coast Salish traditional aesthetic, he was also known for his insistence on experimenting with new forms of expression. He has been described as having contributed to a revival of Coast Salish artistic tradition. A certain adzed texture is characteristic of Charlie's artistic style. Charlie described how his knowledge of the oral tradition of the Hul'qumi'num language of the Cowichan tribe inspired him to design his totem poles - for example the choice of an eagle with a dog salmon on top of a bear with a traditional Salish Swaixwhe mask for his totem pole at Qualicum beach.

He also trained several other Coast Salish artists including Jane Martson, Luke Marston and John Marston. He was the father of Cowichan elder Arvid Charlie Luschiim.

== Awards ==
He was awarded many prizes for his work, including the Canadian Centennial Medal (1967), the Order of British Columbia (2001) and the Order of Canada (2003). Much of his work was totem poles, and they are exhibited in museums such as the Royal British Columbia Museum in Victoria, and in the Parliament Buildings in Ottawa. Several of his totem poles are in the Totem Pole collection of the City of Duncan, including three at the centre court of the Duncan Mall. Many other pieces are found in museums and private collections in the US, Europe and Australia.
