= Peter Robertson (Canadian politician) =

Canadian politician

49th Mayor of Brampton
- In office December 1, 1991 – December 1, 2000
- Preceded by: Paul Beisel
- Succeeded by: Susan Fennell

Personal details
- Born: November 4, 1938
- Died: May 15, 2025 (aged 86)
- Party: Progressive Conservative (as of 1984)

Peter Robertson was mayor of Brampton, Ontario from 1991 to 2000. In 2000, he was defeated in the municipal election by then-councillor Susan Fennell.

== Early career ==
As of 1970, Toronto Gore Township had a population of 1300. Township planning consultant Doug Reddington proposed an official plan to grow the area to 30,000 by 1975. Among other things, it looked to place a hospital within the Claireville Conservation Area owned by the Metro Toronto and Region Conservation Authority. Education consultant Peter Robertson was the sole resident quoted by The Toronto Star, expressing concern about quality of life. Toronto Gore neighboured Bramalea, a "satellite city" in Chinguacousy Township.

As of a July meeting of the Peel Board of Education, Robertson was described as a "spokesman for the Castlemore residents," and former trustee. Board fees meant the Castlemore school had stopped being a focal point in the community. He also advocated for kindergarten to return, as students had to be bused 17 miles to Macville. This led the Board to study the need for their facilities to serve additional purposes in rural areas. Kindergarten returned to Castlemore for the 1970-71 school year.

Robertson stood for Toronto Gore council in 1971, winning one of the four councillor positions.

Toronto Gore councillors passed a by-law in 1961, refusing home construction permits for 10-acre lots. The move was designed to block the loss of agricultural land. By 1972, land prices had grown to such an inflated level that only four of the ten remaining farms were showing a profit. Robertson deemed that the justifications now longer existed, and supported a bit to the Ontario Municipal Board to lift the ban.

Robertson stood for election to be one of the first Peel Regional councillors, in an October 1973 election ahead of Peel's transition from County to Region. Mel Robinson, Reeve of the soon-to-disband Toronto Gore, won with 337 votes, to Robertson's 199 votes, and Stanley Carberry's 68. As one of his last acts as councillor, Robertson advocated for Wildfield residents to be switched over to toll free dialing to Brampton. Simple calls to the City of Brampton offices would result in long distance charges.

== Council ==
At an unlisted point before 1979, Robertson was elected as a Brampton councillor. Among his Peel committees, he chaired a 1980 study for a proposed recycling plant on Bramalea Road in Mississauga. As a member of the Peel District Health Council from at least 1979 on, he was director as of at least 1982. As director, he advocated for community health centres funded by OHIP, similar to a format he toured in San Francisco, where he also toured a wellness clinic. In 1980, Robertson was quoted in the media as defending Kwakiutl, a nude Aboriginal sculpture, disagreeing with Brampton staff advice that the statue's genitalia be shaved off.

In the 1982 election, Robertson's Chinguacousy—Gore regional seat was challenged by Alderman Keith Coutlee; the incumbent won. When asked by the media for an endorsement of who should replace retiring Premier Bill Davis as leader of the Progressive Conservative Party of Ontario, Robertson reserved comment. Robertson ran to become the Progressive Conservative candidate for Brampton, defeated by 25-year-old businessman Jeff Rice on the third ballot. The son of a noted developer, Rice was rumoured favorite of the Tory establishment in Brampton. Dr. Ralph Greene and Nancy Porteous also ran for the nomination. Liberal Bob Callahan would later beat Rice in the traditionally conservative riding.

In the 1985 municipal election, Robertson's Regional seat was challenged by Alderman Mario Annecchini. The challenger suggested that Robertson had collected "too much political baggage", in his 12 years in office. Robertson ran on his record of pushing for sufficient parks and recreation facilities and schools in his ward. At the time, Robertson maintained his position as a professor of education at University of Toronto, and was writing a book on family violence. Robertson won.

He was acclaimed as Regional councillor for Wards 2, 8 and 10 in 1988. In 1990, Robertson was described by the Toronto Star as "one of the driving forces" behind a new race relations committee, set up by the City to inspect the effect of education, employment equity, and housing issues on new immigrants.

=== 1991 mayoral campaign ===
Paul Beisel, appointed Brampton mayor after the death of Ken Whillans, decided to retire from politics at the end of his term, returning to his position as vice-president of Midland Mortgages. Regional councillors Robertson, Eric Carter, and Frank Russell all stood for election, along with businessmen Alan Austin and Don McMullen.

== Post mayoral career ==
In June 2012, Robertson was charged with dangerous operation of a motor vehicle, after striking a pedestrian at 10 Peel Centre Drive, the Region of Peel offices, during a strike by CUPE members. Strikers were aware of his identity as a former Mayor, and stopped him for 27 minutes. Robertson's lawyer says the woman "sat on his car and then fell on the ground." After a long drawn out trial, the case was dismissed.
