= Grant Gibson =

New Zealand cricketer (born 1948)

Personal information
- Full name: John Grant Gibson
- Born: 12 November 1948 (age 78); Hamilton, New Zealand
- Batting: Right-handed
- Bowling: Right-arm off-spin

Domestic team information
- Years: Team
- 1968/69–1980/81: Northern Districts
- 1972/73: Auckland

Career statistics
Competition	First-class	List A
Matches	53	13
Runs scored	2,786	258
Batting average	29.95	19.84
100s/50s	4/12	0/1
Top score	128	75
Balls bowled	25	–
Wickets	0	–
Bowling average	–	–
5 wickets in innings	–	–
10 wickets in match	–	–
Best bowling	–	–
Catches/stumpings	26/–	2/–
- Source: ESPNcricinfo, 9 July 2020

John Grant Gibson (born 12 November 1948) is a New Zealand former cricketer. He played first-class and List A matches for Auckland and Northern Districts between 1969 and 1981. An opening and middle-order batsman, Gibson made his highest score of 128 for Northern Districts against Auckland in 1977–78.
