= John Haggert =

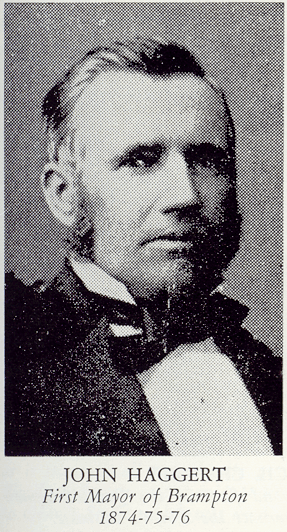

John Haggert (1822 – 26 January 1887 in Brampton) was the first mayor of the town Brampton, now a city, in Ontario, Canada. He held the post from 1874 to 1876.

He was born in Eldersley near Paisley, Scotland, the son of Robert Haggert and Barbara Longhead. Haggert was educated in Scotland and, when he was eighteen, moved to New York City where he trained as an engineer. In 1842, he moved to Hamilton, Canada West, where his parents also settled. He then moved to Beamsville, where he manufactured agricultural implements, later moving his business to Brampton in 1849. He was later joined by his brothers and later became president of the Haggert Brothers Manufacturing Company. Haggert also served on the Brampton school board. In 1851, he married Catherine Cochrane.
