= Bob Callahan (politician) =

Canadian politician from Ontario (1937–2021)

Ontario MPP
- In office 1985–1995
- Preceded by: Bill Davis
- Succeeded by: Tony Clement
- Constituency: Brampton South (1987-1995); Brampton, (1985-1987)

Personal details
- Born: Robert Vincent Callahan; April 11, 1937 New York City, New York, U.S.
- Died: December 26, 2020 (aged 83) Brampton, Ontario, Canada
- Party: Liberal
- Spouse: Lyn
- Children: 4
- Occupation: Lawyer

Robert Vincent Callahan (April 11, 1937 – December 26, 2020) was a Canadian politician from Ontario. Known as “Bob from Brampton” during his political career, he served as a Liberal member of the Legislative Assembly of Ontario from 1985 to 1995 representing the ridings of Brampton and Brampton South. From 1969 to 1985, and from 1997 to 2014 he served as a Brampton city councillor.

== Background ==
Robert Vincent Callahan was born and raised in South Bronx, New York City. His family left for Canada when he was 17.

Callahan had a Bachelor of Arts degree from the University of Toronto and a law degree from Osgoode Hall at York University. He operated a private legal practice in Toronto from 1965 to 1966, when he joined the firm of Beatty, Bowyer & Greenslade in Brampton. In 1969, he became a partner in the Brampton firm of Cook, Callahan & Leschied. Following the departure of partners Cooke and Leschied in 1982 and 1989, he continued in private practice.

Callahan lived in Brampton with his wife, Lyn. Together they raised four boys and had four grandchildren. Bob Callahan died in Brampton on December 26, 2020, at the age of 83.

== Brampton City Council ==
Callahan served as an alderman on the Brampton City Council from 1969 to 1985, representing Ward 3.

== Provincial politics ==
Callahan ran for the Ontario legislature in the 1977 provincial election, but finished third against Progressive Conservative Bill Davis, the sitting Premier, the riding of Brampton. He challenged Davis again in the 1981 election, and finished a distant second.

=== 33rd Parliament, MPP for Brampton (1985-1987) ===
Bill Davis retired from the legislature in early 1985, and Callahan was able to win the Brampton seat on his third effort. In the provincial election of 1985, the Progressive Conservatives under Frank Miller were reduced to a minority government as Liberal support increased in much of the province. Callahan defeated PC candidate Jeff Rice in Brampton by over 4,000 votes, and became a backbench supporter of David Peterson's Liberal government after Miller's ministry was defeated in the legislature.

==== Roles ====
During this term, Callahan served in a variety of roles:

- Chair, Standing Committee on Regulations and Private Bills, May 27, 1987 — July 31, 1987
- Member, Standing Committee on Social Development, May 4, 1987 — July 31, 1987
- Member, Standing Committee on Regulations and Private Bills, May 4, 1987 — July 31, 1987
- Member, Standing Committee on Public Accounts, May 4, 1987 — July 31, 1987
- Member, Select Committee on Health, May 4, 1987 — July 31, 1987
- Member, Standing Committee on Social Development, February 12, 1987 — April 28, 1987
- Member, Standing Committee on Public Accounts, October 29, 1986 — April 28, 1987
- Member, Select Committee on Health, July 10, 1986 — April 28, 1987
- Chair, Select Committee on Health, July 10, 1986 — April 28, 1987
- Chair, Standing Committee on Regulations and Private Bills, May 14, 1986 — April 28, 1987
- Member, Standing Committee on Regulations and Private Bills, April 28, 1986 — April 28, 1987
- Member, Standing Committee on Administration of Justice, October 15, 1986 — October 29, 1986
- Member, Standing Committee on Administration of Justice, April 28, 1986 — July 10, 1986
- Member, Standing Committee on Resources Development, February 12, 1986 — April 22, 1986
- Chair, Standing Committee on Regulations and Private Bills, July 10, 1985 — April 22, 1986
- Member, Standing Committee on Administration of Justice, July 10, 1985 — April 22, 1986
- Member, Select Committee on Health, July 10, 1985 — February 12, 1986
- Chair, Select Committee on Health, July 10, 1985 — February 12, 1986

=== 34th Parliament, MPP for Brampton South (1987-1990) ===
The Liberals won a landslide re-election victory in the 1987 provincial election, and Callahan defeated his nearest opponent by over 11,000 votes in the redistributed riding of Brampton South. He was not appointed to cabinet, and remained in the backbenches. He chaired the Public Accounts Committee of the Legislative Assembly, which studied alcohol and drug addiction, and treatment. The Ottawa Citizen noted that he was suited to the role, given his exposure to the issue; he believed that 75% of those jailed had substance issues. He advocated for the funding of treatment, telling the Citizen "It's kind of like the mechanic said. You can 'pay me now' by treating them 'or pay me later' by putting them in jail or putting up with crime and family breakdown."

==== Roles ====
During this term, Callahan served in a variety of roles:

- Member, Select Committee on Energy, December 20, 1989 — July 30, 1990
- Chair, Standing Committee on Regulations and Private Bills, October 18, 1989 — July 30, 1990
- Member, Standing Committee on Regulations and Private Bills, October 11, 1989 — July 30, 1990
- Chair, Standing Committee on Administration of Justice, May 9, 1989 — October 11, 1989
- Member, Standing Committee on Administration of Justice, May 8, 1989 — October 11, 1989
- Member, Standing Committee on General Government, May 8, 1989 — October 11, 1989
- Member, Standing Committee on General Government, October 24, 1988 — April 25, 1989
- Chair, Standing Committee on Administration of Justice, December 1, 1987 — April 25, 1989
- Member, Standing Committee on Administration of Justice, November 23, 1987 — April 25, 1989

=== 35th Parliament, MPP for Brampton (1990-1995) ===
The New Democratic Party won a majority government in the 1990 provincial election, and the Liberals were reduced to only 36 MPPs. Callahan was one of these, defeating NDP challenger John Scheer by 424 votes. In 1992, he was appointed as his party's critic for Correctional Services.

In 1993, Callahan was a vocal opponent of the NDP government's plans to prohibit the picketing of abortion clinics within Ontario.

==== Roles ====
During this term, Callahan served in a variety of roles:

- Member, Standing Committee on Public Accounts, April 20, 1993 — April 28, 1995
- Critic, Correctional Services, March 6, 1992 — April 28, 1995
- Member, Standing Committee on Public Accounts, April 14, 1992 — April 13, 1993
- Chair, Standing Committee on Public Accounts, December 6, 1990 — April 6, 1992
- Member, Standing Committee on Public Accounts, November 28, 1990 — April 6, 1992

=== 1995 defeat ===
In the 1995 provincial election, the Progressive Conservative Party under Mike Harris won a majority government based primarily on support from Greater Toronto Area communities such as Brampton. Callahan lost his own seat to PC candidate Tony Clement, later a provincial cabinet minister and a candidate for the leadership of the Conservative Party of Canada.

Callahan was gracious despite his loss, as he would often visit Clement's constituency office to suggest ideas and give updates on projects. In return Clement helped Callahan's son Tim in getting the teaching certificate from the provincial Ministry of Education; Tim had completed all requirements but the credentials had been held up by bureaucracy.

== Return to city council ==
Callahan returned to municipal politics after his provincial defeat, and was re-elected for Ward 3 on the Brampton City Council in 1997. He was re-elected up until 2010. He decided to retire from politics and did not put his name forward for the 2014 municipal election.
