= 45th Ontario general election =

Upcoming Canadian provincial election

- On or before April 11, 2030

124 seats of the Legislative Assembly of Ontario 63 seats needed for a majority
- Opinion polls
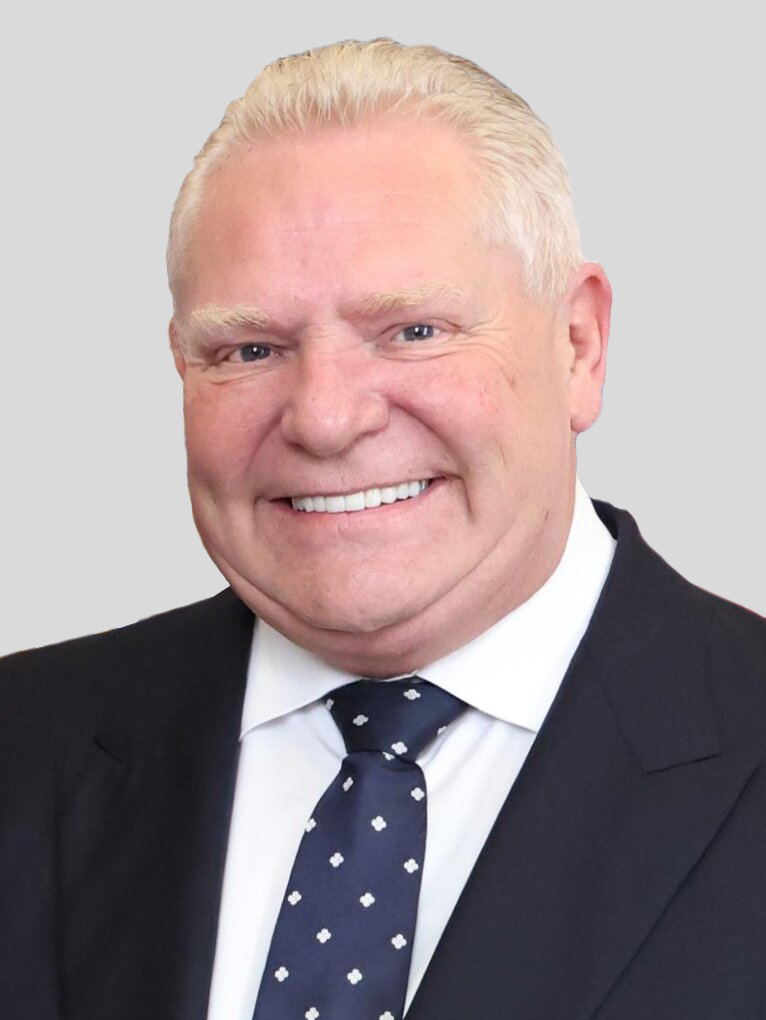

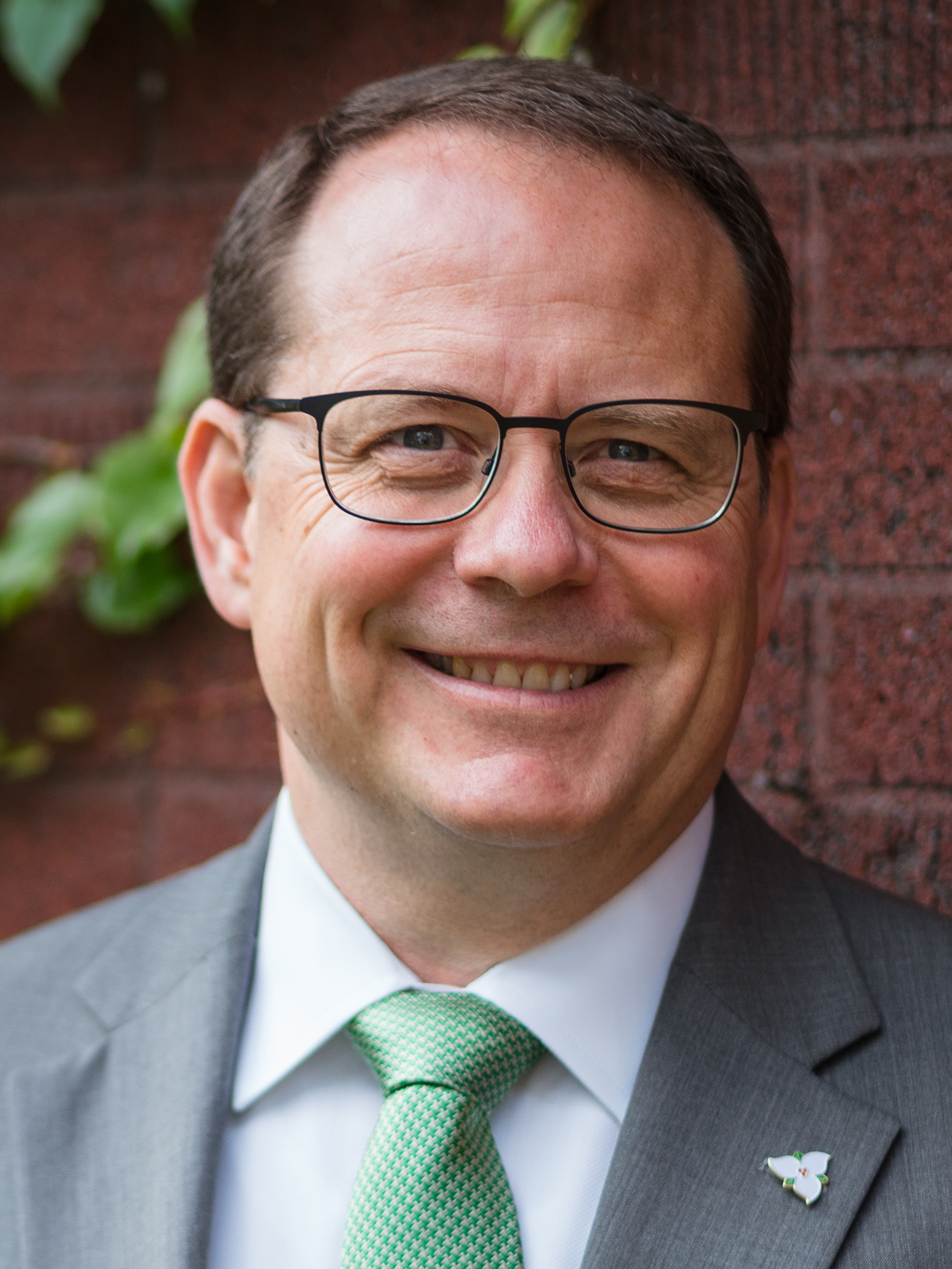
| Leader | Doug Ford | Marit Stiles |
| Party | Progressive Conservative | New Democratic |
| Leader since | March 10, 2018 | February 4, 2023 |
| Leader's seat | Etobicoke North | Davenport |
| Last election | 80 seats, 42.97% | 27 seats, 18.55% |
| Current seats | 79 | 27 |
| Seats needed | Steady | ▲36 |
| Leader | Navdeep Bains | Mike Schreiner |
| Party | Liberal | Green |
| Leader since | November 21, 2026 | November 15, 2009 |
| Leader's seat | None | Guelph |
| Last election | 14 seats, 29.95% | 2 seats, 4.83% |
| Current seats | 14 | 2 |
| Seats needed | ▲49 | ▲61 |
Incumbent Premier
Doug Ford
Progressive Conservative

The 45th Ontario general election is tentatively scheduled to be held on April 11, 2030 unless the Legislative Assembly of Ontario is dissolved earlier by the lieutenant governor of Ontario.

There are no term limits for the Premier of Ontario; Doug Ford confirmed he will seek a fourth term.

== Standings ==
Summary of the standings of the Legislative Assembly of Ontario

| Party | Party leader | Seats | |
| Party | Party leader | 2025 | Current |
|---|---|---|---|
| Progressive Conservative | Doug Ford | 80 | ▼79 |
| New Democratic | Marit Stiles | 27 | 27 |
| Liberal | Navdeep Bains | 14 | 14 |
| Green | Mike Schreiner | 2 | 2 |
| Independent | | 1 | ▲2 |
| Total | | 124 | 124 |

== Timeline ==
=== 2025 ===
- February 27: The Progressive Conservative Party of Ontario under Doug Ford wins a third majority government in the 44th Ontario general election.
- September 14: Bonnie Crombie announces intention to resign as Liberal leader following a disappointing result in a leadership review vote with 57% of support. She initially said she would remain as leader until a leadership race chooses a successor.
- September 20: Marit Stiles receives 68% support in a leadership review vote during the Ontario New Democratic Party's convention, vowing to remain as party leader.

=== 2026 ===
- January 14: Bonnie Crombie resigns as Liberal leader.
- January 19: John Fraser is nominated as interim Liberal leader.
- January 22: Fraser is formally appointed as interim Liberal leader.
- February 3: Doly Begum resigns her seat to run for the federal Scarborough Southwest by-election.
- May 25: Caroline Mulroney announces her intention to resign as MPP on June 5 and retire from politics.
- July 17: Neil Lumsden announces his intention to resign as MPP on August 4 and retire from politics.
- September 3: The NDP's Fatima Shaban wins the 2026 Scarborough Southwest provincial by-election.
- September 3: The PC's Jeff Beattie wins the 2026 Hamilton East—Stoney Creek provincial by-election.
- September 3: The PC's Susan Lahey wins the 2026 York—Simcoe provincial by-election.
- November 21: Navdeep Bains is elected leader of the Liberals.

=== Ridings ===
The Electoral Boundaries Act, 2015 increased the number of electoral districts from 107 to 122, following the boundaries set out by the federal 2013 Representation Order for Ontario, while preserving the special boundaries of the 11 seats in Northern Ontario set out in the 1996 redistribution.

The Far North Electoral Boundaries Commission, appointed in 2016, recommended the creation of the additional districts of Kiiwetinoong and Mushkegowuk—James Bay, carved out from the existing Kenora—Rainy River and Timmins—James Bay ridings, which accordingly raised the total number of seats to 124. This was implemented through the Representation Statute Law Amendment Act, 2017.

With the 2022 Canadian federal electoral redistribution, Ontario was allotted 1 additional seat in the House of Commons. On August 1, 2024, Premier Ford announced that Ontario would break with recent tradition and not adopt the federal electoral boundary changes for the 2025 provincial election.

Ontario does not have legislation in place for a scheduled review of electoral districts and boundaries, and any changes to boundaries would require new legislation.

=== Date of the election ===
Ontario repealed its fixed election date legislation on November 27, 2025.

Under Section 4 of the Canadian Charter of Rights and Freedoms the Ontario legislature is automatically dissolved 5 years after the return of the writs for the previous general election. Polling day in Ontario elections is the 5th Thursday after the date of the writ.

The date fixed for the return of the writs in the 2025 general election was March 7, 2025, meaning that unless the legislature is dissolved earlier it will be automatically dissolved on March 7, 2030, and the latest an election could be held is April 11, 2030.

=== Seat changes ===
44th Parliament of Ontario - Movement in seats held up to the election (2025–present)
| Party | 2025 | Gain/(loss) due to | | | | | present |
| Party | 2025 | Resignation as MPP | Resignation from caucus | Expulsion | Byelection gain | Byelection hold | present |
|---|---|---|---|---|---|---|---|
| Progressive Conservative | 80 | (2) | | (1) | | 2 | 79 |
| New Democratic | 27 | (1) | | | | 1 | 27 |
| Liberal | 14 | | | | | | 14 |
| Green | 2 | | | | | | 2 |
| Independent | 1 | | | 1 | | | 2 |
| Total | 124 | (3) | – | – | | 3 | 124 |

Changes in seats held since February 27, 2025
| Seat | Before | | | | Change | | |
| Seat | Date | Member | Party | Reason | Date | Member | Party |
|---|---|---|---|---|---|---|---|
| Sault Ste. Marie | September 22, 2025 | Chris Scott | █ PC | Expelled from caucus. | | | █ Independent |
| Scarborough Southwest | February 3, 2026 | Doly Begum | █ New Democratic | Resigned to run for the federal Liberal Party in the Scarborough Southwest by-election | September 3, 2026 | Fatima Shaban | █ New Democratic |
| York—Simcoe | June 5, 2026 | Caroline Mulroney | █ PC | Resignation from the legislature. | September 3, 2026 | Susan Lahey | █ PC |
| Hamilton East—Stoney Creek | August 4, 2026 | Neil Lumsden | █ PC | Resignation from the legislature. | September 3, 2026 | Jeff Beattie | █ PC |

== Opinion polls ==
=== Graphical Summary ===
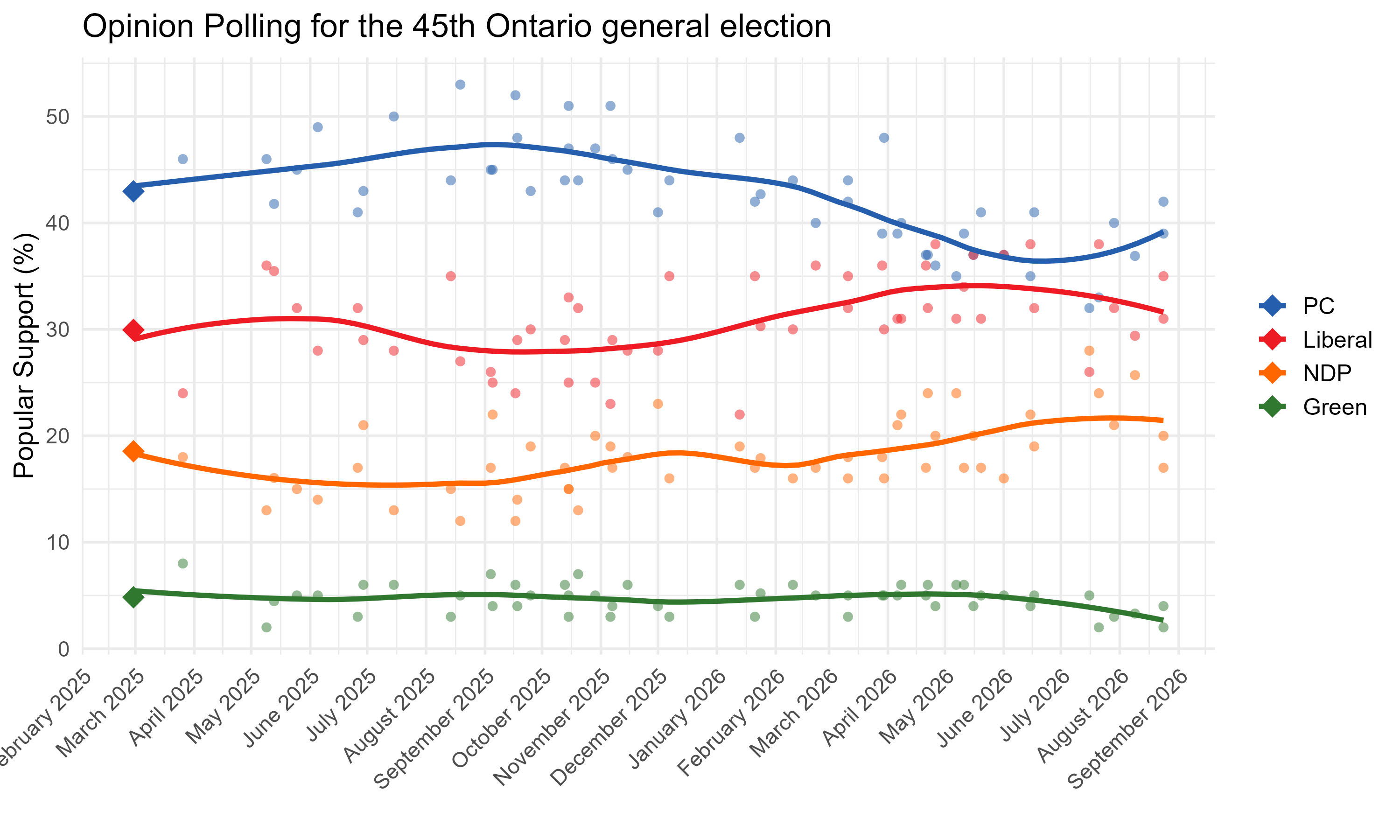
Opinion Polling for the 45th Ontario General Election

=== Table of polls ===
| Polling firm | Last date of polling | Source | PC | NDP | Liberal | Green | Other | Margin of error | Sample size | Polling type | Lead |
|---|---|---|---|---|---|---|---|---|---|---|---|
| | November 21, 2026 | Navdeep Bains is elected Liberal leader | | | | | | | | | |
| Abacus Data | November 4, 2026 | | 39 | 18 | 33 | 5 | 5 | ±3.09% | 1,000 | Online | 6 |
| Liaison Strategies | October 31, 2026 | | 39 | 22 | 32 | 3 | 4 | ±3.1% | 1,000 | IVR | 7 |
| Abacus Data | October 19, 2026 | | 40 | 20 | 32 | 4 | 4 | ±2.1% | 2,291 | Online | 8 |
| Mainstreet Research | September 29, 2026 | | 34 | 27 | 26 | 5 | 8 | ±2.8% | 1,203 | IVR | 7 |
| Liaison Strategies | September 19, 2026 | | 40 | 21 | 34 | 2 | 3 | ±2.5% | 1,600 | IVR | 6 |
| Abacus Data | August 24, 2026 | | 42 | 17 | 31 | 4 | 6 | ±2.5% | 1,518 | Online | 11 |
| Liaison Strategies | August 24, 2026 | | 39 | 20 | 35 | 2 | 3 | ±2.5% | 1,500 | IVR | 4 |
| Pallas Data | August 9, 2026 | | 37 | 26 | 29 | 3 | 5 | ±2.9% | 1,105 | IVR | 8 |
| Liaison Strategies | July 21, 2026 | | 33 | 24 | 38 | 2 | 3 | ±3.1% | 1,000 | IVR | 5 |
| EKOS | July 16, 2026 | | 32 | 28 | 26 | 5 | 9 (Note: Includes 6% for the New Blue Party of Ontario.) | ±2.5% | 1,512 | Telephone | 4 |
| Abacus Data | June 17, 2026 | | 41 | 19 | 32 | 5 | 4 | ±2.1% | 2,182 | Online | 9 |
| Liaison Strategies | June 15, 2026 | | 35 | 22 | 38 | 4 | 1 | ±3.1% | 1,000 | IVR | 3 |
| Abacus Data | May 20, 2026 | | 41 | 17 | 31 | 5 | 5 | ±3.1% | 1,017 | Online | 10 |
| Liaison Strategies | May 16, 2026 | | 37 | 20 | 37 | 4 | 2 | ±3.1% | 1,000 | IVR | Tie |
| Leger | May 11, 2026 | | 39 | 17 | 34 | 6 | 4 | ±3.1% | 1,003 | Online | 5 |
| Mainstreet Research | May 7, 2026 | | 35 | 24 | 31 | 6 | 5 | ±3.2% | 910 | IVR | 4 |
| Liaison Strategies | April 26, 2026 | | 36 | 20 | 38 | 4 | 2 | ±3.1% | 1,000 | IVR | 2 |
| Pallas Data | April 22, 2026 | | 37 | 24 | 32 | 6 | 1 | ±3.1% | 1,007 | IVR | 5 |
| Abacus Data | April 21, 2026 | | 37 | 17 | 36 | 5 | 6 | ±3.1% | 1,000 | Online | 1 |
| Pallas Data | April 8, 2026 | | 40 | 22 | 31 | 6 | 2 | ±3.0% | 1,084 | IVR | 9 |
| Abacus Data | April 6, 2026 | | 39 | 21 | 31 | 5 | 5 | ±2.09% | 2,185 | Online | 8 |
| Liaison Strategies | March 29, 2026 | | 39 | 18 | 36 | 5 | 3 | ±3.1% | 1,000 | IVR | 3 |
| Ipsos | March 11, 2026 | | 42 | 18 | 35 | 3 | 5 | ±4.2% | 801 | Online | 7 |
| Abacus Data | March 11, 2026 | | 44 | 16 | 32 | 5 | 3 | ±3.1% | 1,000 | Online | 12 |
| Liaison Strategies | February 22, 2026 | | 40 | 17 | 36 | 5 | 3 | ±3.1% | 1,000 | IVR | 4 |
| Abacus Data | February 10, 2026 | | 44 | 16 | 30 | 6 | 4 | ±3.1% | 1,001 | Online | 14 |
| Pallas Data | January 24, 2026 | | 43 | 18 | 30 | 5 | 4 | ±3.1% | 1,015 | IVR | 13 |
| Liaison Strategies | January 21, 2026 | | 42 | 17 | 35 | 3 | 2 | ±3.1% | 1,000 | IVR | 7 |
| Abacus Data | January 13, 2026 | | 48 | 19 | 22 | 6 | 5 | ±3.1% | 1,006 | Online | 26 |
| Liaison Strategies | December 7, 2025 | | 44 | 16 | 35 | 3 | 2 | ±3.09% | 1,000 | IVR | 9 |
| Angus Reid | December 1, 2025 | | 41 | 23 | 28 | 4 | 4 | ±3% | 723 | Online | 13 |
| Pallas Data | November 15, 2025 | | 45 | 18 | 28 | 6 | 3 | ±3% | 1,077 | IVR | 17 |
| North Poll | November 7, 2025 | | 46 | 17 | 29 | 4 | 4 | —N/a | 742 | Online | 17 |
| Abacus Data | November 6, 2025 | | 51 | 19 | 23 | 3 | 4 | ±3.1% | 1,000 | Online | 28 |
| Leger | October 20, 2025 | | 44 | 13 | 32 | 7 | 3 | ±3.1% | 1,052 | Online | 12 |
| Liaison Strategies | October 15, 2025 | | 47 | 15 | 33 | 3 | 2 | ±3.4% | 800 | IVR | 14 |
| Abacus Data | October 15, 2025 | | 51 | 15 | 25 | 5 | 4 | ±3.1% | 1,000 | Online | 26 |
| Relay Strategies | October 13, 2025 | | 44 | 17 | 29 | 6 | 5 | —N/a | 1,268 | Online | 15 |
| Mainstreet Research | September 18, 2025 | | 48 | 14 | 29 | 3 | 5 | ±3.2% | 958 | Online | 19 |
| Abacus Data | September 17, 2025 | | 52 | 12 | 24 | 6 | 6 | ±3.1% | 1,021 | Online | 28 |
| Angus Reid | September 5, 2025 | | 45 | 22 | 25 | 4 | 6 | ±3% | 935 | Online | 20 |
| Pallas Data | September 4, 2025 | | 45 | 17 | 26 | 7 | 5 | ±3.1% | 1,026 | IVR | 19 |
| Abacus Data | August 19, 2025 | | 53 | 12 | 27 | 5 | 3 | ±3.04% | 1,037 | Online | 26 |
| Liaison Strategies | August 14, 2025 | | 44 | 15 | 35 | 3 | 3 | ±3.4% | 800 | Telephone | 9 |
| Abacus Data | July 15, 2025 | | 50 | 13 | 28 | 6 | 3 | ±3.1% | 1,000 | Online | 22 |
| Pallas Data | June 29, 2025 | | 43 | 21 | 29 | 6 | 2 | ±3% | 1,080 | IVR | 14 |
| Mainstreet Research | June 26, 2025 | | 41 | 17 | 32 | 3 | 7 | ±3.2% | 923 | Smart IVR | 9 |
| Abacus Data | June 5, 2025 | | 49 | 14 | 28 | 5 | 4 | ±3.1% | 1,000 | Online | 21 |
| Leger | May 25, 2025 | | 45 | 15 | 32 | 5 | 3 | ±3.1% | 1,025 | Online | 13 |
| Liaison Strategies | May 9, 2025 | | 46 | 13 | 36 | 2 | 3 | ±3.09% | 1,000 | IVR | 10 |
| Campaign Research (Note: Campaign Research is an internal PC Party polling firm led by Nick Kouvalis.) | March 26, 2025 | | 46 | 18 | 24 | 8 | 4 | ±2.2% | 1,672 | Online | 22 |
| 2025 election | February 27, 2025 | —N/a | 42.97 | 18.55 | 29.95 | 4.83 | 3.70 | —N/a | —N/a | —N/a | 13.02 |
