= Ontario Highway 425 =

Under construction freeway in Ontario

Highway 425
- Bradford Bypass Interchanges

Route information
- Maintained by Ministry of Transportation of Ontario
- Length: 16.2 km (10.1 mi)
- History: Proposed June 1978 (Note: The Bradford Bypass is associated with the former proposal to extend Highway 89 across the Holland River, a route announced on June 30, 1978.); Cancelled April 1986 (Note: Highways Minister Ed Fulton officially cancelled the Highway 89 Extension on April 21, 1986.); Revised 1989 (Note: The 1989 Highway 404/89 Route Location Study confirmed the need for a freeway north of Bradford linking Highway 400 to the future Highway 404 Extension. The Environmental Assessment that followed referred to the route as the Bradford Bypass.) (as Bradford Bypass); Approved August 2002; Shelved October 2003 (Note: Following the 2003 Ontario general election, the Bradford Bypass was dropped from provincial plans. Minister of Transportation Donna Cansfield confirmed in May 2007 that no further work was being undertaken on the corridor.); Revived May 18, 2017

Major junctions
- West end: Highway 400 near Bradford
- County Road 4 (Yonge Street)
- East end: Highway 404 near Keswick

Location
- Country: Canada
- Province: Ontario
- Divisions: Simcoe County; York Region
- Towns: Bradford West Gwillimbury, East Gwillimbury

Highway system
- Ontario provincial highways; Current; Former; 400-series

King's Highway 425, commonly referred to as Highway 425 and known as the Bradford Bypass or the Highway 400–404 Link, is an under-construction east–west 400-series highway in the northern Greater Toronto Area of the Canadian province of Ontario. The approximately 16.2-kilometre (10.1 mi) route is currently undergoing planning and analysis under an environmental impact assessment (EA) by the Ministry of Transportation of Ontario (MTO) and the Government of Ontario. If approved, a new four-lane controlled-access highway would be built between Highway 400 near Bradford in Simcoe County, and Highway 404 near Queensville in York Region. It would serve as a bypass to the north side of Bradford.

The corridor originated in 1978 as an eastern extension of Highway 89 along Ravenshoe Road. This proposal was cancelled in 1986 and collaborative studies were undertaken between the province and affected municipalities over the next several years. A refined proposal for a freeway along a more southerly route, referred to as the Bradford Bypass, was released in 1989, after which an EA began in 1993. The assessment was completed in 1997 and approved in 2002, after which it was announced that construction would begin by 2006 and be completed by 2010. However, following the 2003 Ontario general election, the Liberal government of Dalton McGuinty shelved several highway proposals — including the Bradford Bypass — to the "beyond 2031" timeframe. After the 2018 Ontario general election, the new Progressive Conservative (PC) government of Doug Ford announced that the EA would be reviewed and updated. Funding was committed to the project in the 2021 budget, with early works construction beginning in early 2022. The highway is currently estimated to cost C$800 million.

The Bradford Bypass has been criticized for its potential environmental impacts, particularly to the Holland Marsh and surrounding wetlands draining into Lake Simcoe. While the route is endorsed by the municipalities surrounding it and through which it passes, critics note that the EA is outdated and that the highway would result in induced demand and encourage further reliance on personal vehicle usage.

== Route description ==
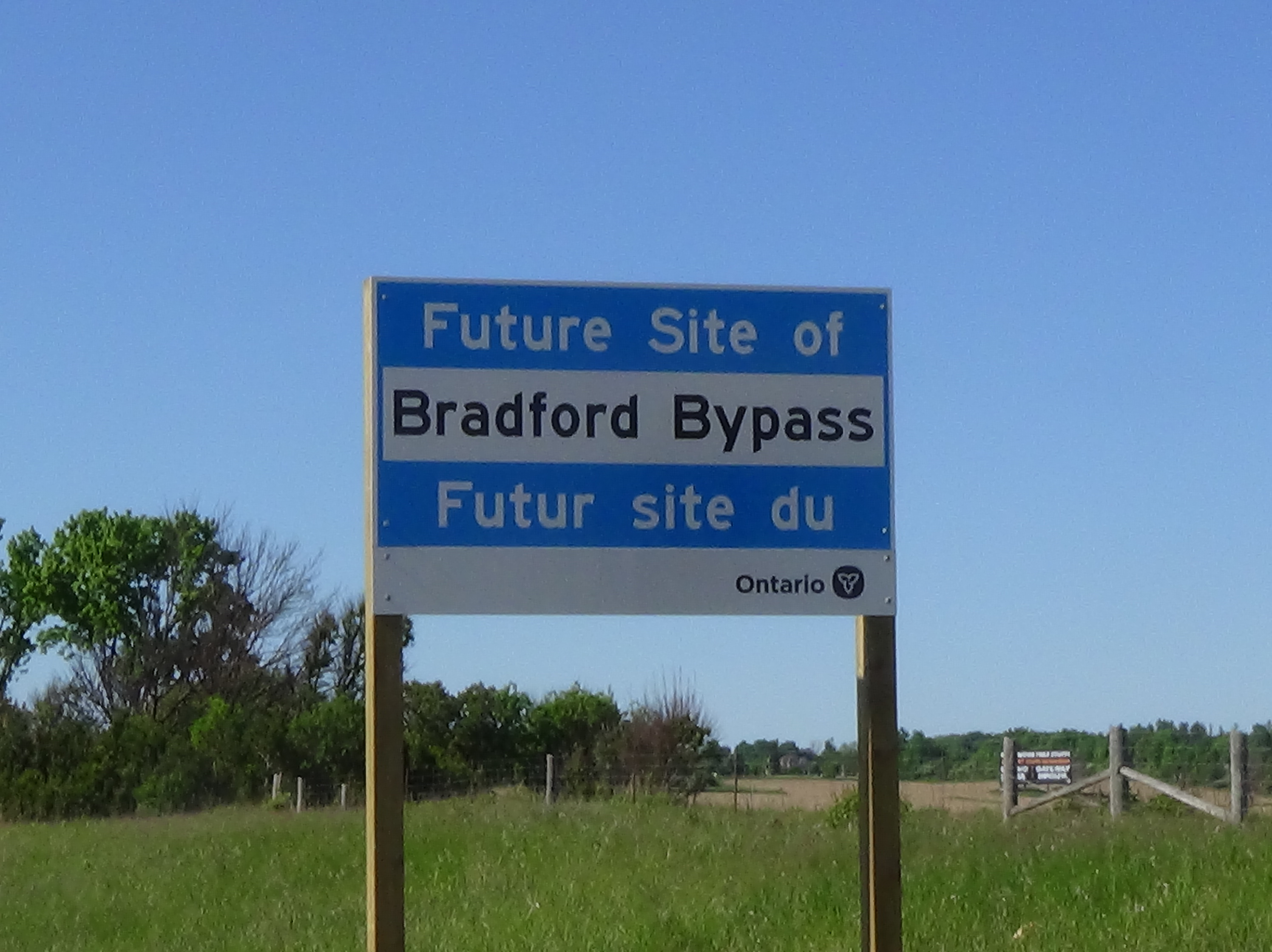
Sign at the site of the future Bradford Bypass interchange on Highway 400

The proposed route of the Bradford Bypass was established in the 1997 EA, including the location and design of interchanges.

If built, the approximately 16.2-kilometre-long (10.1 mi) corridor would consist of a four-lane rural freeway situated within a 100-metre (330 ft)-wide right-of-way. It would feature a 30-metre (100 ft) grass median, except at the two Holland River crossings, where the median would narrow to 8 metres (26 ft) with a central concrete barrier.

The proposed route of the Bradford Bypass would have it begin in the west at a freeway-to-freeway interchange with Highway 400, midway between the 8th Line and 9th Line of Bradford West Gwillimbury. From there the four-lane rural highway would proceed east, crossing the 10th Sideroad and encountering an interchange with the northern section of Yonge Street (formerly Highway 11 and presently Simcoe County Road 4) immediately north of the town of Bradford. It would then curve southeast to cross the West Holland River into the northeastern extent of the municipality of King in York Region, after which it would encounter an interchange with Bathurst Street and straighten out towards the east into East Gwillimbury.

The highway would cross the East Holland River and pass immediately south of the Silver Lakes Golf and Country Club. It would cross the southern section of Yonge Street (thus resulting in an unusual crossing of both offset legs of the street) then cut through farmland, parallel with Queensville Sideroad. At Leslie Street (York Regional Road 12), immediately north of the community of Queensville, a partial interchange would provide westbound access to and eastbound access from the highway. It would end shortly thereafter at a freeway-to-freeway interchange Highway 404.

The Holland Marsh is a Provincially Significant Wetland, portions of which are also designated as a Life Science Area of Natural and Scientific Interest (ANSI) and the remainder under the Natural Heritage System (NHS) of the Greenbelt. The proposed route of the Bradford Bypass crosses the Holland Marsh between Yonge and Bathurst Streets, and would require 10.75 hectares (27 acres) of land within the NHS portion; it will not cross any wetlands. Bridges of approximately 400 and 600 metres (1300 and 2000 feet) will cross the two branches of the Holland River.

== History ==
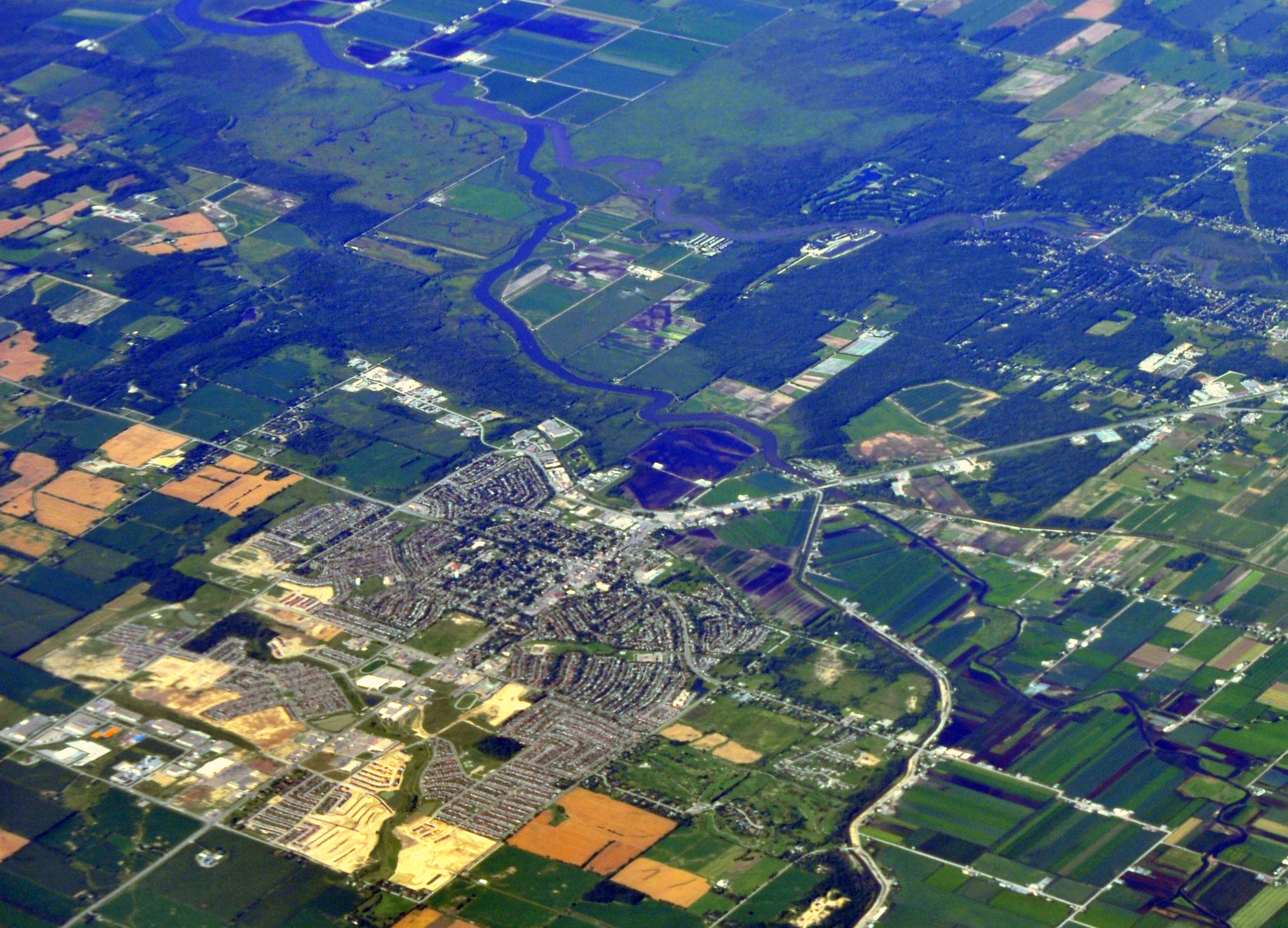
Aerial view of Bradford and the Holland Marsh. The Highway 425 would cross the image from the middle-left to the upper-right.

=== Highway 89 extension ===
Proposals for a highway corridor south of Lake Simcoe date as far back as the 1960s, but were not formally considered until the late 1970s. On June 30, 1978, a 48 km (30 mi) extension of Highway 89 east of Highway 400 to Highway 12 was announced. It was to follow 11th Line from Highway 400 east to the Holland Marsh, where it would cross towards the northeast onto the alignment of Ravenshoe Road (York Road 32). The extension would have traversed the length of Ravenshoe Road to Lakeridge Road (Durham Road 23), where it would zig-zag onto Concession Road 7 and end immediately north of Sunderland.

In June 1981, environmental approval was given for the project, excluding the portion crossing of the Holland Marsh. The marsh crossing was opposed by the Sierra Club, the Federation of Ontario Naturalists, the Canadian Wildlife Service, and the Ministry of Natural Resources (MNR). The MTO, then known as the Ministry of Transportation and Communications (MTC), conducted several studies on the crossing and alternatives to it, which were collectively published in July 1984. However, as a result of public opposition and due to the potential environmental impacts of crossing the marsh, Minister of Transportation Edward Fulton abruptly cancelled the project on April 21, 1986. In his speech, Fulton said of the C$30 million project: "The environmental impact outweighs the transportation benefits in the particular location." While this was applauded by environmental advocates, it was opposed by several local politicians, as well as the York Region Federation of Agriculture, both of which began to petition the government to reverse the decision.

=== Highway 400 – Highway 404 Link ===
The MTO engaged in several years of consultations with York Region, Simcoe County, and various other project stakeholders. The resulting Highway 404/89 Route Location Study, published in 1989, confirmed the need for a "Provincial facility north of Bradford linking Highway 400 to the future Highway 404 Extension." Highway 404 was itself opened as far north as Davis Drive (York Regional Road 31) on October 24, 1989; the proposed extension largely succeeded the Highway 89 extension east of Woodbine Avenue. Separate EAs for both the Bradford Bypass and the Highway 404 extension began in 1993 and 1992, respectively. The EA for the Bradford Bypass was completed in December 1997, with environmental studies noting that the proposed highway may contaminate groundwater and the Lake Simcoe watershed. The Chippewas of Georgina Island First Nation were noted to oppose the route due to archaeological concerns. Both EAs were approved on August 28, 2002. Later that year on October 4, Minister of Transportation Norm Sterling announced that design work was progressing, with construction set to begin in 2006, with completion expected by 2010.

As an interim measure, several upgrades were made to the roads surrounding Newmarket in the early 2000s. The Newmarket Bypass – consisting of the widening to four lanes of Davis Drive (former Highway 9) between Highway 400 and Bathurst Street, Bathurst Street between Davis Drive and Green Lane, and Green Lane between Bathurst Street and Leslie Street – was approved by York Region in January 1999; construction began in September 2002. Construction began on a four-lane extension of Highway 404 from Davis Drive to Green Lane, and the reconstruction of Green Lane into a four-laned arterial road between Leslie Street and Woodbine Avenue in September 2000. Both were completed and opened to traffic on February 8, 2002, at a ceremony attended by MPP for York North Julia Munro and York Region chairman Bill Fisch. The Newmarket Bypass was completed and opened on September 1, 2004.

Meanwhile, during the 2003 Ontario general election campaign, incumbent PC premier Ernie Eves pledged to build the Bradford Bypass. Liberal leader Dalton McGuinty, who would go on to win the election, promised to tackle gridlock with a transit-oriented approach, pledging only "the removal of highway bottlenecks." The McGuinty government passed the Places to Grow Act in 2005, which set forth consistent urban planning principles across the province for the following 25 years. The Growth Plan for the Greater Golden Horseshoe was released in June of the following year as a framework for implementing the act, which despite including the Highway 404 extension as far as Ravenshoe Road, did not show the Bradford Bypass. Minister of Transportation Donna Cansfield confirmed in May 2007 that no further work was being undertaken on the corridor.

The Bradford Bypass was first included in the 2002 Transportation Master Plan for York Region. Simcoe County followed suit in its 2008 Transportation Master Plan. In late 2011, York Region and Simcoe County commenced the York-Simcoe Boundary Area Transportation Needs Study as a basis to advocate for the bypass. Despite this and studies conducted by the MTO, the provincial government did not change its stance in the five-year Growth Plan for the Greater Golden Horseshoe in 2012.

In 2014, a report into transportation needs in the Lake Simcoe area was positive about the highway, stating that the Bypass would be heavily used and easy to build. However, the report also stated that alternatives such as building high-occupancy vehicle lanes on Highway 400 and improving local roads and interchanges could deliver similar benefits with less environmental impact. Representatives from York Region, Simcoe County, East Gwillimbury, Georgina, Bradford West Gwillimbury, Innisfil, Essa Township and Newmarket together lobbied the provincial government in November 2015 to put the project on its growth plan. The bypass was revived on May 18, 2017 when it was included in the five-year Growth Plan for the Greater Golden Horseshoe, though without a timeline for construction.

=== Current status ===
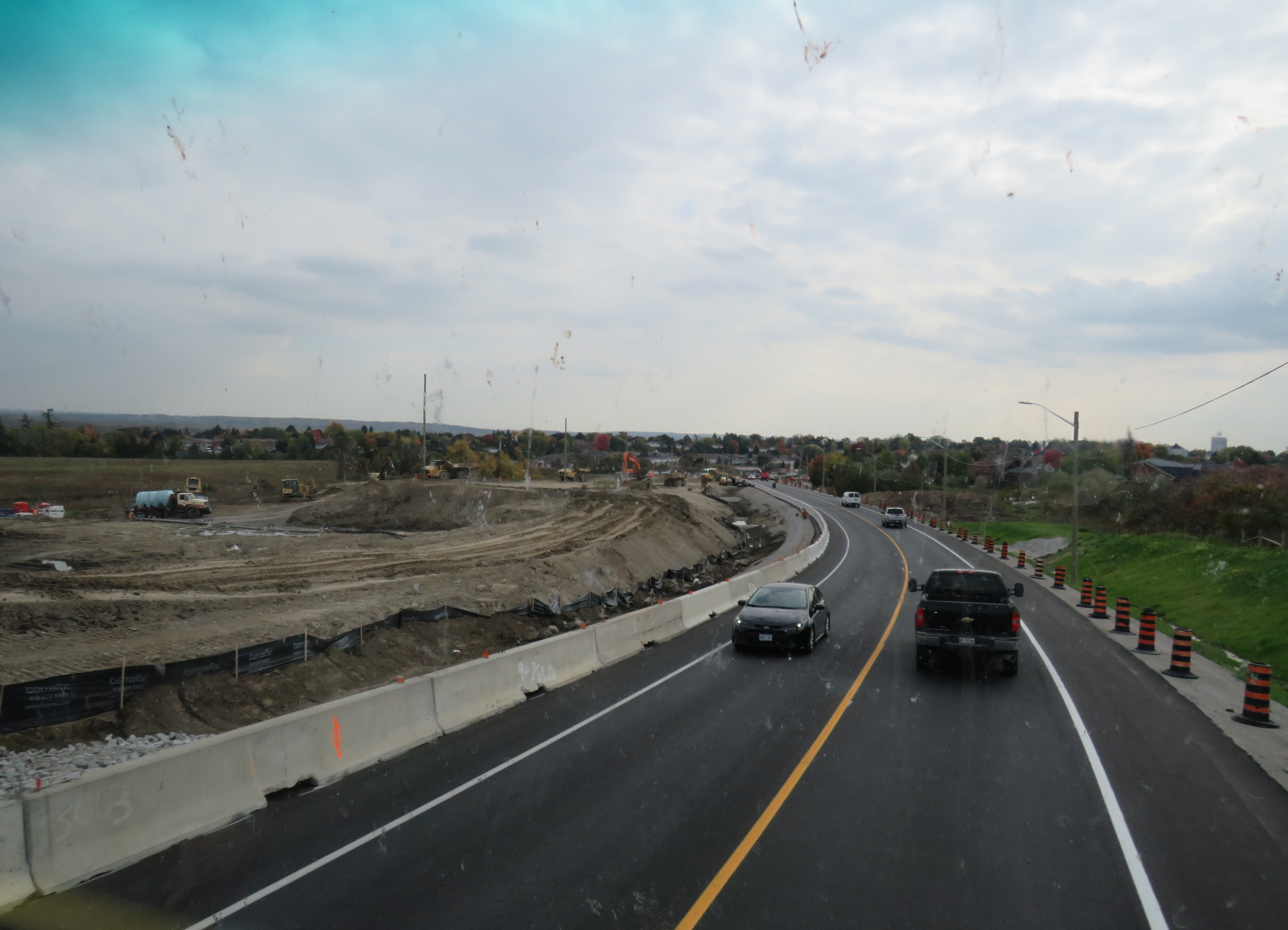
Early construction of the Yonge Street (Simcoe County Road 4) interchange in October 2023

On August 15, 2019, Minister of Transportation and MPP for York—Simcoe, Caroline Mulroney, announced that planning for the Bradford Bypass would resume after years of being shelved. The MTO is currently in the process of updating the 1997 EA, with completion expected in 2023. Engineering and design work on the bypass began in the summer of 2020, while environmental studies to update the 1997 EA commenced in September. The 2021 Ontario Budget, released on March 24, 2021, allocated funding towards the highway. Early works construction was tentatively scheduled to begin in the autumn of 2021, but was deferred until early 2022. As of June 2021, the project's estimated cost is C$800 million.

On February 3, 2021, Jonathan Wilkinson, the federal Minister of Environment and Climate Change, announced that he received a request for the project to undergo an EA at the federal level, following a formal request from Environmental Defence. On May 3, 2021, Wilkinson announced that a federal EA would not take place for the Bradford Bypass, while the GTA West project would undergo this process. In February 2022, the federal government reiterated that the project would not undergo a federal EA, despite requests from environmental groups.

In April and May 2021, a virtual public consultation regarding design alternatives for refinements to the route identified in the 2002 EA took place. Proposed changes included realigning the Holland River crossing to the south to reduce the impact on the river, new designs for interchanges to meet contemporary MTO standards, and other minor realignments and changes. Following analysis of this consultation, a subsequent public consultation in the autumn of 2022 will present the preferred design for the route. The finalised design of the route and EA is currently anticipated to be completed in early 2023.

In October 2021, a Toronto Star investigation into the Bypass found that the proposed modification to the route would remove it from a golf course jointly owned by the father of MPP Stan Cho, associate minister of transportation. Cho responded that the conflict of interest had been declared, and that he did not take part in any work connected to the Bypass. In February 2022, the Integrity Commissioner of Ontario found there was no evidence of wrongdoing by Minister Mulroney or Associate Minister Cho regarding the rerouting of the Bypass.

A Freedom of information request demonstrated that the province had undertaken a business case on the potential of the Bypass being a toll road similar to Highway 407, to potentially reduce the cost of building the highway. However, the office of Minister Mulroney stated that "it is not our intention to toll this highway". Funding was committed to the project as part of the fall economic statement on November 1, 2021.

In November 2022, construction on the project began with work on the Yonge Street interchange. In May 2026, the future highway was given the Highway 425 designation, and construction began along the corridor itself.

== Perspectives ==
Construction of the highway is supported by the provincial government, the upper-tier governments of York Region and Simcoe County, and the local municipalities of Bradford West Gwillimbury, East Gwillimbury, Georgina, Innisfil, King and Newmarket. It is also supported by the Holland Marsh Growers Association and local businesses. PC, Liberal and NDP candidates for the riding of York—Simcoe all publicly supported the highway during the 2018 provincial election campaign, with Liberal leader Steven Del Duca stating in 2021 that support from locals means that the highway proposal is worth consideration. A 2016 survey commissioned by the Town of Bradford West Gwillimbury showed that 85% of residents support construction of the Bradford Bypass, with stronger support among those familiar with the proposal. Claimed benefits of the bypass would include removing through traffic from nearby rural roads and urban areas, reduced congestion, improved air quality, and the potential revitalisation of downtown Bradford.

Environmental groups including Environmental Defence Canada, the Rescue Lake Simcoe Coalition and Simcoe County Greenbelt Coalition oppose the highway, criticising the impact it would have on the environment. In addition to increasing air pollution and greenhouse gas emissions, opponents claim the highway would disrupt woodlands, provincially significant wetlands, the Lake Simcoe watershed, wildlife habitats and species at risk. The highway has also historically been criticised for its potential impact on the Holland Marsh and the Holland River. According to the 1997 EA, it would cause severe water quality impacts in the Lake Simcoe watershed, with further studies required if the project was proceeded with. The groups contend that there was "no climate change impact assessment required, no study of the impact on migratory birds or fish habitat, and no ... archeological study" conducted as part of the EA. They have also criticised the 32 year timeframe since the need for and alternatives to the project were last assessed, the changes in circumstances since then, the potential for urban sprawl along the highway, and a claim that the bypass would save drivers only "60 to 80 seconds" of journey time.

Archaeologists, historians, and Indigenous groups are also concerned about the threat the bypass would pose to the Lower Landing, a nationally significant historic site thought to be located along the proposed route. The Lower Landing was a key meeting place on the route connecting Lake Ontario to Lake Huron, and had been used for centuries by Indigenous peoples, explorers, fur traders, settlers, and soldiers travelling between the lower and upper Great Lakes prior to the mid-1800s. Indigenous groups and heritage advocates are concerned that construction of the proposed bypass would irreversibly destroy the site before it can be properly investigated.

Local municipalities and the provincial government have pushed back on environmental concerns, noting that the EA will be updated to take into account existing and new federal & provincial legislation and standards. The MTO, meanwhile, contends that the route would result in "10 to 35 minutes of travel time saved each way."

== Exit list ==
The following table lists the proposed locations for interchanges along the Bradford Bypass contained within the MTO review.

County	Location	km	mi	Destinations	Notes
Simcoe County	Bradford West Gwillimbury	0.0	0.0	Highway 400 – Toronto, Barrie	
Simcoe County	Bradford West Gwillimbury	2.4	1.5	Sideroad 10	
Simcoe County	Bradford West Gwillimbury	5.8	3.6	County Road 4 (Yonge Street) – Bradford, Innisfil	Formerly Highway 11; Interchange started construction in November 2022
York Region	King - East Gwillimbury boundary	9.3	5.8	Bathurst Street	
York Region	Queensville (East Gwillimbury)	14.8	9.2	Regional Road 12 (Leslie Street)	Eastbound exit and westbound entrance
York Region	Queensville (East Gwillimbury)	16.2	10.1	Highway 404 – Toronto, Keswick	Highway 404 exit 63
1.000 mi = 1.609 km; 1.000 km = 0.621 mi: Proposed
