= 2026 York—Simcoe provincial by-election =

2026 provincial by-election in Ontario, Canada

- September 3, 2026

Riding of York—Simcoe
	First party	Second party	Third party
	PC	LIB	NDP
Candidate	Susan Lahey	Naomi Davison	Bobby Nikmard
Party	Progressive Conservative	Liberal	New Democratic
Last election	59.40%	23.89%	7.71%
Popular vote	11,491	8,942	974
Percentage	49.81%	38.76%	4.22%
Swing	▼9.59 pp	▲14.86 pp	▼3.49 pp
MPP before election
Caroline Mulroney (Note: Resigned on June 5, 2026.)
Progressive Conservative
Elected MPP
Susan Lahey
Progressive Conservative

A by-election was held on September 3, 2026 in the provincial riding of York—Simcoe to elect a member of the Legislative Assembly of Ontario. The by-election was triggered by the resignation of Progressive Conservative MPP Caroline Mulroney, who resigned from the legislature and the provincial cabinet on June 5, 2026.

Mulroney had represented York—Simcoe since 2018 and was re-elected in the 2022 and 2025 provincial elections.

Premier Doug Ford called the by-election on August 5 for voting on September 3, concurrently with by-elections in Hamilton East—Stoney Creek and Scarborough Southwest.

== Background ==
York—Simcoe has been represented by Progressive Conservative MPPs since the riding was created for the 2007 Ontario general election. Julia Munro represented the riding from 2007 until her retirement in 2018, having previously represented the predecessor riding of York North beginning in 1995.

Caroline Mulroney, the daughter of former prime minister Brian Mulroney, was elected as the Progressive Conservative MPP for York—Simcoe in the 2018 Ontario general election. She received 26,050 votes, or 57.3 per cent of the vote, defeating NDP candidate Dave Szollosy.

Mulroney was re-elected in 2022 with 20,789 votes, or 56.8 per cent of the vote, and again in 2025 with 24,705 votes, or 59.4 per cent. In the 2025 election, Liberal candidate Fatima Chaudhry finished second with 9,941 votes, or 23.9 per cent, while NDP candidate Justin Graham finished third with 3,206 votes, or 7.7 per cent.

During her eight years in the legislature, Mulroney served in several cabinet positions in the government of Premier Doug Ford, including Attorney General, Minister of Transportation, Minister of Francophone Affairs and President of the Treasury Board.

On May 25, 2026, Mulroney announced that she would resign from provincial politics, with her departure taking effect June 5. She said that the death of her father in 2024 and changes in her family life had led her to consider a new chapter outside elected politics. Her resignation as MPP and as president of the Treasury Board and minister of Francophone affairs took effect on June 5.

Elections Ontario subsequently confirmed that the York—Simcoe seat was vacant. Under provincial law, the by-election must be called by December 2, 2026, with December 31 being the latest possible election day.

Mulroney's departure created the second vacancy in the legislature after former Scarborough Southwest NDP MPP Doly Begum resigned to run successfully in the 2025 Canadian federal election. A third vacancy was scheduled to occur after Hamilton East—Stoney Creek Progressive Conservative MPP Neil Lumsden announced that he would resign effective August 4.

== Candidates ==
On June 17, Progressive Conservative leader and premier Doug Ford announced East Gwillimbury councillor Susan Lahey as the party's candidate. Lahey, a longtime York—Simcoe resident, was elected to East Gwillimbury council in the 2022 municipal election. She is also a small-business owner and community volunteer. Lahey is president of Eastern Art Consultants Inc., an appraisal firm she founded in 2006.

On July 16, the Ontario Liberal Party selected Naomi Davison, the regional councillor for the Town of Georgina, as its candidate. Davison was elected to Georgina and York regional councils in the 2022 municipal election. As a regional councillor, she serves on several York Region committees and boards, including the Accessibility Advisory Committee and Housing York Inc.

The Ontario New Democratic Party nominated Babak (Bobby) Nikmard on August 4 as its candidate for the by-election. He has been an education support worker with the Toronto District School Board since 2008 and is a member of the board of directors for Youth Now on Track.

On July 28, the Green Party of Ontario announced Matt Pearce as their candidate. He lives in East Gwillimbury and works in automotive manufacturing. He was the Green Party of Canada candidate in York—Durham in the 2025 federal election.

On July 18, the New Blue Party of Ontario announced that physician David Ghobrial would be their candidate. He is the owner of a medical clinic in Beeton and lives in Bond Head. He was the New Blue Party candidate in Simcoe—Grey in the 2025 and 2022 provincial elections.

On August 11, the Ontario Libertarian Party announced that party leader Sean Conroy would be their candidate. He has served as leader of the party since November 2025, and was the candidate in this riding in 2025. He resides in Georgina and works as a senior manager in the live-events industry.

The Ontario Party candidate is Gerald Auger. He was the party candidate in Barrie—Springwater—Oro-Medonte in 2022. He works as a financial adviser and product specialist. He lives in Tay Township.

Jonathan Scott, Ward 2 councillor for Bradford West Gwillimbury said he was approached by the PCs, Liberals, NDP and Greens about running, but declined. He said that if he had decided to run, it would have been with the Liberals.

== Results ==
Ontario provincial by-election, September 3, 2026: York—Simcoe resignation of Caroline Mulroney
Party	Candidate	Votes	%	±%
Progressive Conservative	Susan Lahey	11,941	49.81	-9.51
Liberal	Naomi Davison	8,942	38.76	+14.86
New Democratic	Bobby Nikmard	974	4.22	-3.49
Green	Matt Pearce	642	2.78	-2.04
Libertarian	Sean Conroy	394	1.71	+0.66
New Blue	David Ghobrial	383	1.66	-0.36
Ontario Party	Gerald Auger	244	1.06	+0.30
Total valid votes		23,070		
Total rejected, unmarked, and declined ballots				
Turnout			21.00	-19.30
Eligible voters		109,883		
Progressive Conservative hold		Swing		-12.23
Source: Elections Ontario

== Previous result ==
2025 Ontario general election
Party	Candidate	Votes	%	±%
Progressive Conservative	Caroline Mulroney	24,705	59.40	+2.64
Liberal	Fatima Chaudhry	9,941	23.90	+6.65
New Democratic	Justin Graham	3,206	7.71	–3.44
Green	Jennifer Baron	2,006	4.82	–2.53
New Blue	Brent Fellman	841	2.02	–2.44
Libertarian	Sean Conroy	434	1.04	+0.32
Ontario Party	Alana Hollander	317	0.76	–1.15
Moderate	Franco Colavecchia	138	0.33	–0.09
Total valid votes/expense limit		41,588	99.42	–0.14
Total rejected, unmarked, and declined ballots		243	0.58	+0.14
Turnout		41,831	40.56	+1.56
Eligible voters		103,146		
Progressive Conservative hold		Swing		–2.01
Source: Elections Ontario

== See also ==
- List of Ontario by-elections
- 44th Parliament of Ontario
- 2026 Hamilton East—Stoney Creek provincial by-election
- 2026 Scarborough Southwest provincial by-election
