= 44th Parliament of Ontario =

Canadian provincial legislature since 2025

- Majority parliament
- Apr. 14, 2025 – present

Parliament leaders
- Premier: Doug Ford; Jun. 29, 2018 – present
- Cabinet: Ford ministry
- Leader of the Opposition: Marit Stiles; Feb. 4, 2023 – present

Party caucuses
- Government: Progressive Conservative
- Opposition: New Democratic
- Recognized: Liberal
- Unrecognized: Green

Legislative Assembly
- Speaker of the Assembly: Donna Skelly; Apr. 14, 2025 – present
- Government House leader: Steve Clark; Jun. 6, 2024 – present
- Opposition House leader: John Vanthof; Feb. 15, 2023 – present
- Members: 124 MPP seats

Sovereign
- Monarch: Charles III; Sep. 8, 2022 – present
- Lieutenant governor: Edith Dumont; Nov. 14, 2023 – present

Sessions
- 1st session April 14, 2025 – present
← 43rd

The 44th Parliament of Ontario (or the 44th Ontario Legislature) is the provincial legislature of Ontario currently in office. Its composition was initially determined by the Ontario general election held on February 27, 2025. The incumbent governing party from the 43rd Parliament, the Progressive Conservative Party of Ontario led by Premier Doug Ford, claimed eighty seats, close to two-thirds of the 124 seats available, securing a third consecutive majority mandate for the Ford ministry to continue in office.

In opposition to the government are two recognized party, the Ontario New Democratic Party (NDP) with twenty-seven members led by Marit Stiles, the Leader of the Opposition, and the Ontario Liberal Party with fourteen members led by its parliamentary leader John Fraser. They are joined by two Green MPPs and one independent MPP.

Following the general election, the legislature was called into session on April 14, 2025. As its first order of business, the Ontario legislature elected its first Madam Speaker in Donna Skelly.

Speaker Skelly was not the only new titleholder from the retirement of former Speaker Ted Arnott. In addition to holding the speakership in the 42nd and 43rd parliament, Arnott also shared the distinction as joint-dean of the legislature in the 42nd parliament, and held the title by himself in the 43rd, having first got elected in 1990 and held the title as the baby of the 35th parliament. With Arnott's retirement, the current dean of the legislature is Ernie Hardeman of Oxford, the last remaining member elected in the twentieth century and the last remaining member who have served in a previous Ontario ministry, and one of only two members who have been part of a government caucus of a previous government (the other being Liberal parliamentary leader John Fraser). Arnott was succeeded in this own seat by Joseph Racinsky, coincidentally the new baby of the house at age 23.

== Legislative Session ==
The first session of the 44th parliament commenced on April 14, 2025, and remains in session as of September of 2026.

The legislature has however went on recess for extended periods. After 23 sitting days in spring of 2025, it was adjourned for a summer recess of more than four months in 2025 (June 6 to October 19 of 2025). It sat for 28 days in the fall of 2025 and adjourned for a winter recess of more than three months (from December 12, 2025 to March 22, 2026). It held 30 days of legislative sitting in spring of 2026 and has been adjourned for the summer since June 3, 2026, and is not scheduled to reconvene until October 27, 2026.

== Party standings ==
Affiliation	Party leader	Status	Seats	
Affiliation	Party leader	Status	2025 election	Current (Note: following the September 3, 2026 by-elections)
Progressive Conservative	Doug Ford	Government	80	79
New Democratic	Marit Stiles	Official Opposition	27	27
Liberal	John Fraser (interim)	Third party	14	14
Green	Mike Schreiner	(Not recgonized)	2	2
Independent			1	2
Vacant				0
Total			124	
Government Majority			36	34

44th Parliament of Ontario
following September 3, 2026 byelections
PC (79)
NDP (27)
Liberal (14)
Green (2)
former PC (1)
Independent (1)

cabinet
parliamentary/house leaders, whips

Sp

For current detailed chamber seating plan published by the Office of the Assembly: Chamber seating plan, 44th parliament, linked from Members (MPPs) page

== Presiding officers and parliamentary leaders ==
The following table lists the presiding officers of the 44th parliaments and the parliamentary leaders of the various party caucuses. For information about the cabinet members in office during the 44th parliament, please see Ford ministry.

	Charles III; King of Canada		
	Edith Dumont; Lieutenant Governor		
	Donna Skelly; Flamborough—Glanbrook; Speaker		
Deputy Speaker & Chair, CoW (since October 2026)	Ric Bresee; Hastings—Lennox and Addington	Jennifer French; Oshawa	First Deputy; Chair, CoW
Second Deputy; Chair, CoW (since October 2026)	John Jordan; Lanark—Frontenac—Kingston	Andrea Hazell; Scarborough—Guildwood	Third Deputy; Chair, CoW
Government		Opposition	
Premier; PC Leader	Doug Ford; Etobicoke North	Marit Stiles; Davenport	Leader of the Opposition
Deputy Premier	Sylvia Jones; Dufferin—Caledon	Sol Mamakwa; Kiiwetinoong	Deputy Leader; NDP
Government; House Leader	Steve Clark; Leeds—Grenville—Thousand; Islands and Rideau Lakes	John Vanthof; Timiskaming—Cochrane	Opposition; House Leader
Deputy Government; House Leader	Anthony Leardi; Essex	Chandra Pasma; Ottawa West—Nepean	Deputy Opposition; House Leader
Chief; Government Whip (since Sept. 2026)	Effie Triantafilopoulos; Oakville North—Burlington	Peggy Sattler; London West	Chief; Opposition Whip
Deputy; Government Whip	Steve Pinsonneault; Lambton—Kent—Middlesex	Terence Kernaghan; London North Centre; Jamie West, Sudbury	Deputy Whip, NDP
Deputy; Government Whip	Natalie Pierre; Burlington	John Fraser; Ottawa South	Liberal; Parliamentary Leader
		Lucille Collard; Ottawa—Vanier	Liberal; House Leader
		Stephanie Bowman; Don Valley West	Liberal Deputy; House Leader
		Adil Shamji; Don Valley East	Liberal; Chief Whip
		Stephanie Smyth; Toronto—St. Paul's	Liberal; Deputy Whip
		Mike Schreiner; Guelph	Green Party; Leader (not recongized)

== List of members ==
Electoral district	Name	Party	First elected / Previously elected	No. of terms	Note
Ajax	Robert Cerjanec	Liberal	2025	1st term	
Algoma—Manitoulin	Bill Rosenberg	Progressive Conservative	2025	1st term	
Aurora—Oak Ridges—Richmond Hill	Michael Parsa	Progressive Conservative	2018	3rd term	
Barrie—Innisfil	Andrea Khanjin	Progressive Conservative	2018	3rd term	
Barrie—Springwater—Oro-Medonte	Doug Downey	Progressive Conservative	2018	3rd term	
Bay of Quinte	Tyler Allsopp	Progressive Conservative	2024	2nd term	
Beaches—East York	Mary-Margaret McMahon	Liberal	2022	2nd term	
Brampton Centre	Charmaine Williams	Progressive Conservative	2022	2nd term	
Brampton East	Hardeep Grewal	Progressive Conservative	2022	2nd term	
Brampton North	Graham McGregor	Progressive Conservative	2022	2nd term	
Brampton South	Prabmeet Sarkaria	Progressive Conservative	2018	3rd term	
Brampton West	Amarjot Sandhu	Progressive Conservative	2018	3rd term	
Brantford—Brant	Will Bouma	Progressive Conservative	2018	3rd term	
Bruce—Grey—Owen Sound	Paul Vickers	Progressive Conservative	2025	1st term	
Burlington	Natalie Pierre	Progressive Conservative	2022	2nd term	
Cambridge	Brian Riddell	Progressive Conservative	2022	2nd term	
Carleton	George Darouze	Progressive Conservative	2025	1st term	
Chatham-Kent—Leamington	Trevor Jones	Progressive Conservative	2022	2nd term	
Davenport	Marit Stiles	New Democratic	2018	3rd term	
Don Valley East	Adil Shamji	Liberal	2022	2nd term	
Don Valley North	Jonathan Tsao	Liberal	2025	1st term	
Don Valley West	Stephanie Bowman	Liberal	2022	2nd term	
Dufferin—Caledon	Sylvia Jones	Progressive Conservative	2007	6th term	
Durham	Todd McCarthy	Progressive Conservative	2022	2nd term	
Eglinton—Lawrence	Michelle Cooper	Progressive Conservative	2025	1st term	
Elgin—Middlesex—London	Rob Flack	Progressive Conservative	2022	2nd term	
Essex	Anthony Leardi	Progressive Conservative	2022	2nd term	
Etobicoke Centre	Kinga Surma	Progressive Conservative	2018	3rd term	
Etobicoke—Lakeshore	Lee Fairclough	Liberal	2025	1st term	
Etobicoke North	Doug Ford	Progressive Conservative	2018	3rd term	
Flamborough—Glanbrook	Donna Skelly	Progressive Conservative	2018	3rd term	
Glengarry—Prescott—Russell	Stéphane Sarrazin	Progressive Conservative	2022	2nd term	
Guelph	Mike Schreiner	Green	2018	3rd term	
Haldimand—Norfolk	Bobbi Ann Brady	Independent	2022	2nd term	
Haliburton—Kawartha Lakes—Brock	Laurie Scott	Progressive Conservative	2003, 2011	7th term*	
Hamilton Centre	Robin Lennox	New Democratic	2025	1st term	
Hamilton East—Stoney Creek	Neil Lumsden (Until August 4, 2026)	Progressive Conservative	2022	2nd term	Resignation: August 4, 2026
Hamilton East—Stoney Creek	Jeff Beattie (From September 3, 2026)	Progressive Conservative	2026	1st term	By-election: September 3, 2026
Hamilton Mountain	Monica Ciriello	Progressive Conservative	2025	1st term	
Hamilton West—Ancaster—Dundas	Sandy Shaw	New Democratic	2018	3rd term	
Hastings—Lennox and Addington	Ric Bresee	Progressive Conservative	2022	2nd term	
Humber River—Black Creek	Tom Rakocevic	New Democratic	2018	3rd term	
Huron—Bruce	Lisa Thompson	Progressive Conservative	2011	5th term	
Kanata—Carleton	Karen McCrimmon	Liberal	2023	2nd term	
Kenora—Rainy River	Greg Rickford	Progressive Conservative	2018	3rd term	
Kiiwetinoong	Sol Mamakwa	New Democratic	2018	3rd term	
King—Vaughan	Stephen Lecce	Progressive Conservative	2018	3rd term	
Kingston and the Islands	Ted Hsu	Liberal	2022	2nd term	
Kitchener Centre	Aislinn Clancy	Green	2023	2nd term	
Kitchener—Conestoga	Mike Harris Jr.	Progressive Conservative	2018	3rd term	
Kitchener South—Hespeler	Jess Dixon	Progressive Conservative	2022	2nd term	
Lambton—Kent—Middlesex	Steve Pinsonneault	Progressive Conservative	2024	2nd term	
Lanark—Frontenac—Kingston	John Jordan	Progressive Conservative	2022	2nd term	
Leeds—Grenville—Thousand Islands and Rideau Lakes	Steve Clark	Progressive Conservative	2010	6th term	
London—Fanshawe	Teresa Armstrong	New Democratic	2011	5th term	
London North Centre	Terence Kernaghan	New Democratic	2018	3rd term	
London West	Peggy Sattler	New Democratic	2013	5th term	
Markham—Stouffville	Paul Calandra	Progressive Conservative	2018	3rd term	
Markham—Thornhill	Logan Kanapathi	Progressive Conservative	2018	3rd term	
Markham—Unionville	Billy Pang	Progressive Conservative	2018	3rd term	
Milton	Zee Hamid	Progressive Conservative	2024	2nd term	
Mississauga Centre	Natalia Kusendova-Bashta	Progressive Conservative	2018	3rd term	
Mississauga East—Cooksville	Silvia Gualtieri	Progressive Conservative	2025	1st term	
Mississauga—Erin Mills	Sheref Sabawy	Progressive Conservative	2018	3rd term	
Mississauga—Lakeshore	Rudy Cuzzetto	Progressive Conservative	2018	3rd term	
Mississauga—Malton	Deepak Anand	Progressive Conservative	2018	3rd term	
Mississauga—Streetsville	Nina Tangri	Progressive Conservative	2018	3rd term	
Mushkegowuk—James Bay	Guy Bourgouin	New Democratic	2018	3rd term	
Nepean	Tyler Watt	Liberal	2025	1st term	
Newmarket—Aurora	Dawn Gallagher Murphy	Progressive Conservative	2022	2nd term	
Niagara Centre	Jeff Burch	New Democratic	2018	3rd term	
Niagara Falls	Wayne Gates	New Democratic	2014	5th term	
Niagara West	Sam Oosterhoff	Progressive Conservative	2016	4th term	
Nickel Belt	France Gélinas	New Democratic	2007	6th term	
Nipissing	Vic Fedeli	Progressive Conservative	2011	5th term	
Northumberland—Peterborough South	David Piccini	Progressive Conservative	2018	3rd term	
Oakville	Stephen Crawford	Progressive Conservative	2018	3rd term	
Oakville North—Burlington	Effie Triantafilopoulos	Progressive Conservative	2018	3rd term	
Orléans	Stephen Blais	Liberal	2020	3rd term	
Oshawa	Jennifer French	New Democratic	2014	4th term	
Ottawa Centre	Catherine McKenney	New Democratic	2025	1st term	
Ottawa South	John Fraser	Liberal	2013	5th term	
Ottawa—Vanier	Lucille Collard	Liberal	2020	3rd term	
Ottawa West—Nepean	Chandra Pasma	New Democratic	2022	2nd term	
Oxford	Ernie Hardeman	Progressive Conservative	1995	9th term	
Parkdale—High Park	Alexa Gilmour	New Democratic	2025	1st term	
Parry Sound—Muskoka	Graydon Smith	Progressive Conservative	2022	2nd term	
Perth—Wellington	Matthew Rae	Progressive Conservative	2022	2nd term	
Peterborough—Kawartha	Dave Smith	Progressive Conservative	2018	3rd term	
Pickering—Uxbridge	Peter Bethlenfalvy	Progressive Conservative	2018	3rd term	
Renfrew—Nipissing—Pembroke	Billy Denault	Progressive Conservative	2025	1st term	
Richmond Hill	Daisy Wai	Progressive Conservative	2018	3rd term	
St. Catharines	Jennie Stevens	New Democratic	2018	3rd term	
Sarnia—Lambton	Bob Bailey	Progressive Conservative	2007	6th term	
Sault Ste. Marie	Chris Scott	Progressive Conservative	2025	1st term	
Sault Ste. Marie	Chris Scott	Independent (Note: since September 2025)	2025	1st term	
Scarborough—Agincourt	Aris Babikian	Progressive Conservative	2018	3rd term	
Scarborough Centre	David Smith	Progressive Conservative	2022	2nd term	
Scarborough—Guildwood	Andrea Hazell	Liberal	2023	2nd term	
Scarborough North	Raymond Cho	Progressive Conservative	2016	4th term	
Scarborough—Rouge Park	Vijay Thanigasalam	Progressive Conservative	2018	3rd term	
Scarborough Southwest	Doly Begum (Until February 3, 2026)	New Democratic	2018	3rd term	Resignation: February 3, 2026
Scarborough Southwest	Fatima Shaban (From September 3, 2026)	New Democratic	2026	1st term	By-election: September 3, 2026
Simcoe—Grey	Brian Saunderson	Progressive Conservative	2022	2nd term	
Simcoe North	Jill Dunlop	Progressive Conservative	2018	3rd term	
Spadina—Fort York	Chris Glover	New Democratic	2018	3rd term	
Stormont—Dundas—South Glengarry	Nolan Quinn	Progressive Conservative	2022	2nd term	
Sudbury	Jamie West	New Democratic	2018	3rd term	
Thornhill	Laura Smith	Progressive Conservative	2022	2nd term	
Thunder Bay—Atikokan	Kevin Holland	Progressive Conservative	2022	2nd term	
Thunder Bay—Superior North	Lise Vaugeois	New Democratic	2022	2nd term	
Timiskaming—Cochrane	John Vanthof	New Democratic	2011	5th term	
Timmins	George Pirie	Progressive Conservative	2022	2nd term	
Toronto Centre	Kristyn Wong-Tam	New Democratic	2022	2nd term	
Toronto—Danforth	Peter Tabuns (Note: Interim Leader of the New Democratic Party and Leader of the Opposition from June 28, 2022 to February 4, 2023.)	New Democratic	2006	7th term	
Toronto—St. Paul's	Stephanie Smyth	Liberal	2025	1st term	
University—Rosedale	Jessica Bell	New Democratic	2018	3rd term	
Vaughan—Woodbridge	Michael Tibollo	Progressive Conservative	2018	3rd term	
Waterloo	Catherine Fife	New Democratic	2012	5th term	
Wellington—Halton Hills	Joseph Racinsky	Progressive Conservative	2025	1st term	
Whitby	Lorne Coe	Progressive Conservative	2016	4th term	
Willowdale	Stan Cho	Progressive Conservative	2018	3rd term	
Windsor—Tecumseh	Andrew Dowie	Progressive Conservative	2022	2nd term	
Windsor West	Lisa Gretzky	New Democratic	2014	4th term	
York Centre	Michael Kerzner	Progressive Conservative	2022	2nd term	
York—Simcoe	Caroline Mulroney (Until June 5, 2026)	Progressive Conservative	2018	3rd term	Resignation: June 5, 2026
York—Simcoe	Susan Lahey (From September 3, 2026)	Progressive Conservative	2026	1st term	By-election: September 3, 2026
York South—Weston	Mohamed Firin	Progressive Conservative	2025	1st term	

== Timeline ==
=== Changes in MPPs ===
seat changed hand after by-election
involuntary departure

Progressive Conservative
Liberal Green

New Democratic
Independent

43rd Ontario Parliament (2022–25) - Membership and party affiliation changes
Electoral District	Before			Change	
Electoral District	Date	Reason	Member exited	New member	Date
Sault Ste. Marie	September 22, 2025	Removal from caucus (Note: following arrest for charges of domestic assault and assault with a weapon)	Chris Scott		
Scarborough Southwest	February 3, 2026	Resignation (Note: to contest federal by-election as a federal Liberal candidate)	Doly Begum	Fatima Shaban	September 3, 2026
York—Simcoe	June 5, 2026	Resignation	Caroline Mulroney	Susan Lahey	September 3, 2026
Hamilton East—Stoney Creek	June 5, 2026	Resignation	Neil Lumsden	Jeff Beattie	September 3, 2026

=== Membership changes ===
Party Number of members	2025		2026			
Party Number of members	Feb 28	Sep 22	Feb 3	June 5	Aug 4	Sept 3
Progressive Conservative	80	79		78	77	79
New Democratic	27		26			27
Liberal	14					
Green	2					
Independent	1	2 (Note: inclusive of one former PC member excluded from caucus)				
Total members	124		123	122	121	124
Vacant	0		1	2	3	0
