= Newton Robinson =

- Hamlet
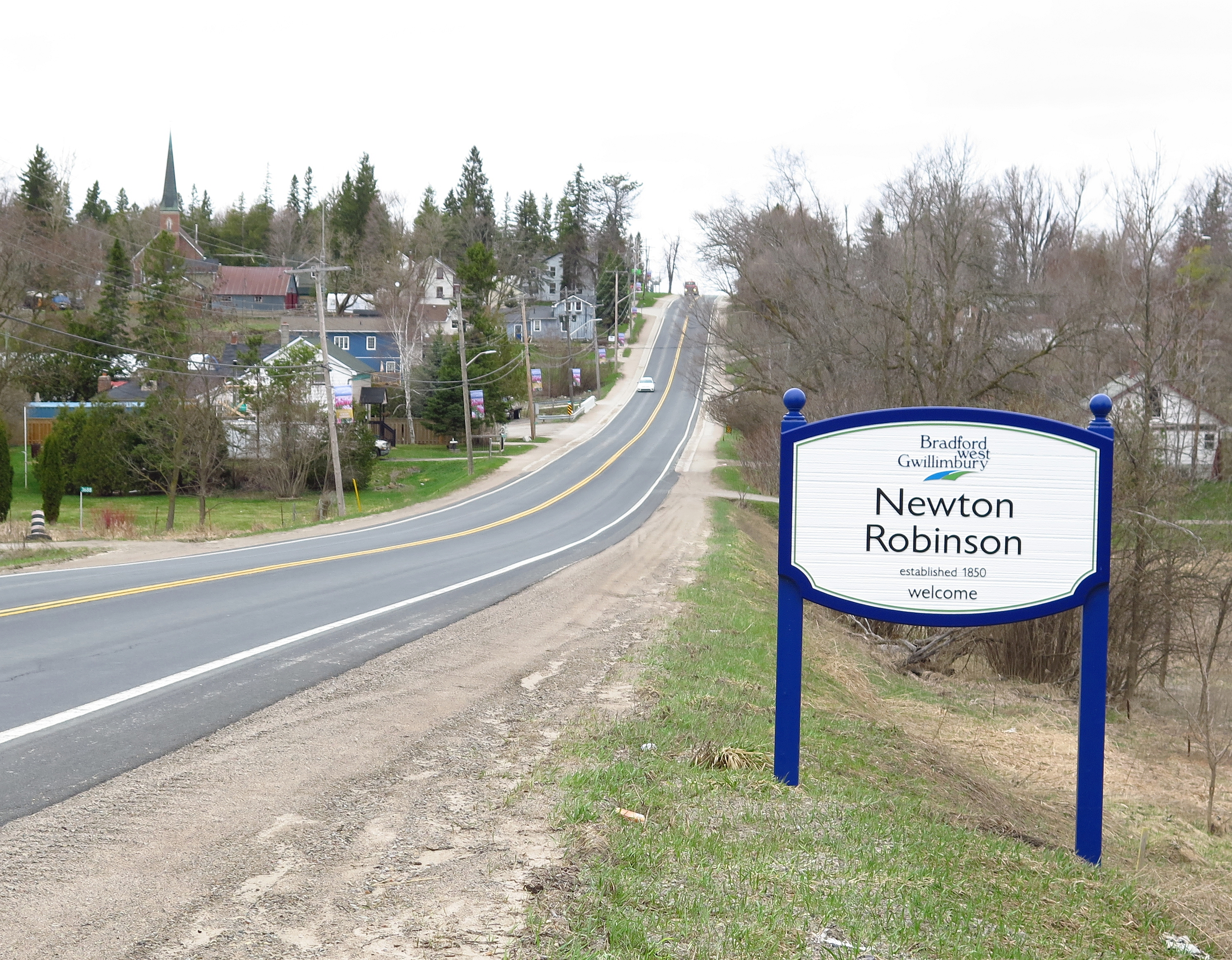

- Location within Ontario
- Coordinates: 44°07′33″N 79°41′08″W
- Country: Canada
- Province: Ontario
- County: Simcoe

Government
  - Mayor: Rob Keffer
  - MPs: Peter Van Loan
  - MPPs: Julia Munro

Area
  - Total: 9.66 km^{2} (3.73 sq mi)

Population (2011)
  - Total: 94
  - Density: 9.73/km^{2} (25.2/sq mi)
- Time zone: UTC-5 (EST)
  - Summer (DST): UTC-4 (EDT)
- Postal code span: L3Z
- Area codes: 289, 905, and 705

Newton Robinson is located in the southern part of Ontario, Canada, at the tenth concession of Tecumseth ('Line 10') and Bradford West Gwillimbury. It is approximately an hour's drive from Toronto.

== History ==
During the 1820s Newton Robinson was called Latimer's Corners after the innkeeper, and later Springfield. When William Chantler arrived from England in 1850, he established a general store and became postmaster. As there was already a post office going by Latimer’s Corners, this new post office needed a new name. It was decided to call the place Newtown Robinson, for one of the Newtowns in Ireland and in honour of William Benjamin Robinson, who represented Simcoe County in Parliament from 1828 to 1858. At some point in time after 1877, the name was consistently shortened to Newton Robinson. During the 1880s, Newton Robinson was busy because of the train tracks that went through it. As people eventually started emerging there, a cheese factory, a sawmill and a number of small businesses had their openings. On January 14, 1886, the Newton Robinson Column had said: "Our town, like yourself, had the spirit of progression about its pants pockets. The latest edition [addition] is a tonsorial artist, who reports business booming, and as the place where they dispense the fish of all fish, the oyster, at 10 cents a plate (cheap and wholesome is their motto)"." In 1893, the railroads closed and were redirected to Alliston Beeton in Bradford. This caused the shutdown of the sawmill and general store because of the low business.

== Notable structures ==
There are several structures in Newton Robinson that have a historical significance.

=== The old school ===
The school opened in 1923 and closed in 1962. The school yard is now separated into two separate yards, but is still defined by the large beech trees bordering the perimeter of the old school yard. There are two front doors, one for the girls and the other for the boys.

=== The church ===
The Methodist church opened for its first Sunday service on October 23, 1887. it was built to replace the log church that was first opened in 1841. It is situated on two thirds of an acre with a cemetery on either side of it. During this time, the church was the central point of Newton Robinson residents; it was used as a meeting point, for celebratory events as well as for religious purposes.

=== The general store ===
Past: The store was used a train station as well as the main general store. The train station would bring visitors in from distances. The easy transportation for visitors was one of the main reasons the town was prospering. Farmer's would sell crops and trade good with the store. Once the train station was relocated, the general store soon went out of business. Present: The store is now currently owned by Jacquie and is called El Lugar Con Pottery. She sells imported Mexican Pottery along with baked goods and ice cream in what used to be the general store. She rents the train station out as a residence.

== Notable people ==
- William Earl Rowe, member of the Legislative Assembly of Ontario.
- Bob Pulford, professional hockey player.
- Harris George Rogers, Canadian federal politician.
