= Pinkerton, Ontario =

Pinkerton
- Unincorporated rural community
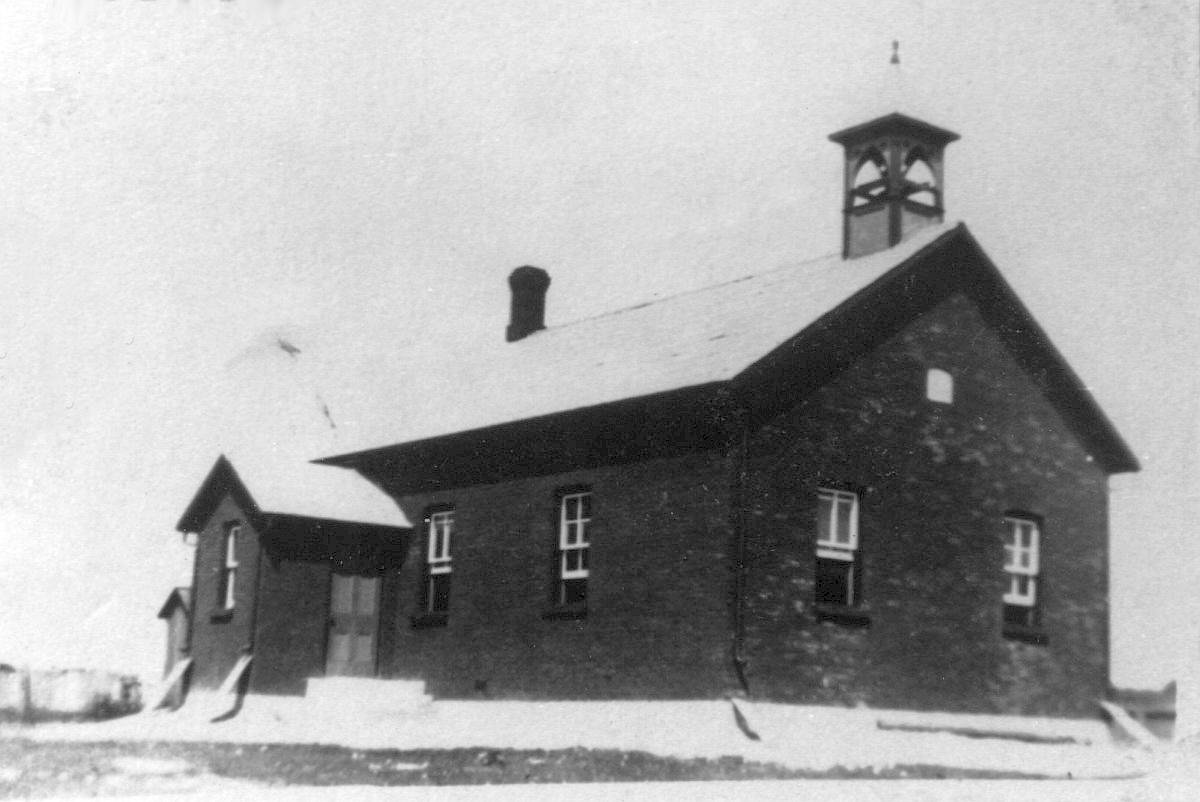
- Pinkerton School (S.S. 11), circa 1908

- Location within Canada Location within Ontario
- Coordinates: 44°08′45″N 79°39′12″W
- Country: Canada
- Province: Ontario
- County: Simcoe
- Township: Bradford West Gwillimbury
- Time zone: UTC-5 (Eastern (EST))
  - Summer (DST): UTC-4 (EDT)
- GNBC Code: FDTJN

Pinkerton (also Pinkerton's Corners) is an unincorporated rural community in Bradford West Gwillimbury Township, Simcoe County, Ontario, Canada.

== History ==
Matthew Pinkerton, a surveyor and early settler, built a log school house in 1840.

A Wesleyan Methodist Church was erected in 1844, and a hotel was built in Pinkerton in 1854. A Primitive Methodist Church was built in 1864, and St. Luke's Anglican Church was established in 1871.

Pinkerton School (S.S. 11) was built in 1873, and was one of the first brick schools in the area. A new brick school with a bell tower and two entrances was built in 1908, and was used until at least the late 1950s.

The Toronto–Barrie Highway, now called Ontario Highway 400, was built through the east boundary of Pinkerton in the late 1940s.

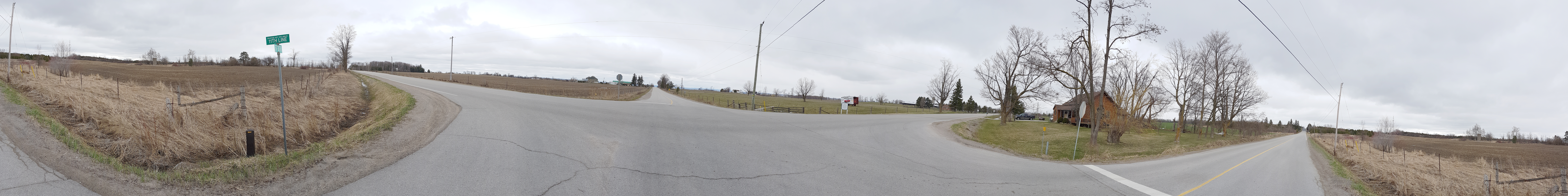
Pinkerton in 2017
