= Ministry of Francophone Affairs =

Department of the Government of Ontario

- Ministère des Affaires francophones (French)
- Government of Ontario wordmark

Ministry overview
- Formed: 1986
- Preceding Ministry: Office of Francophone Affairs
- Jurisdiction: Government of Ontario
- Ministers responsible: Caroline Mulroney, Minister of Francophone Affairs; Natalia Kusendova, Parliamentary Assistant to the Minister of Francophone Affairs
- Website: www.ontario.ca/page/ministry-francophone-affairs

The Ministry of Francophone Affairs (French: Ministère des Affaires francophones) in the Canadian province of Ontario is responsible for the provision of government services to Franco-Ontarian citizens and communities.

It was originally founded as the Office of Francophone Affairs (French: Office des affaires francophones) in 1986 by the government of David Peterson, as an expansion of the former Office of the Government Coordinator of French-Language Services. It was upgraded to a full ministry in 2017 by the government of Kathleen Wynne.

Following the 2018 Ontario general election, the new government of Doug Ford announced plans to demote the department from a ministry back down to an office, but was forced to backtrack in the face of community opposition.

Under the province's French Language Services Act, the provincial government provides French language services if a community or region's francophone population exceeds 5,000 or 10 percent of the community's total population. There are 25 areas of the province so designated. The office also has a role in the governance of Ontario's francophone public television network, TFO, as well as francophone school boards and other government offices, and acts as a liaison office between the government and other francophone cultural agencies and social services.

The current Minister of Francophone Affairs is Caroline Mulroney.

== Ministry agencies ==
- Provincial Advisory Committee on Francophone Affairs
- Special Advisor on Francophone Affairs
- Special Advisor on Francophone Economic Development

Source: Public Appointments Secretariat

=== Minister Responsible for French Language Service ===
- Alan Pope (May 17, 1985 — June 26, 1985)

=== Minister Responsible for Francophone Affairs ===
- Bernard Grandmaître (June 26, 1985 — August 2, 1989)
- Charles Beer (August 2, 1989 — October 1, 1990)
- Gilles Pouliot (October 1, 1990 — June 26, 1995)
- Noble Villeneuve (June 26, 1995 — June 17, 1999)
- John Baird (June 17, 1999 — April 14, 2002)

=== Associate Minister Responsible for Francophone Affairs ===
- John Baird (April 15, 2002 — August 22, 2002)

=== Minister Responsible for Francophone Affairs ===
- John Baird (April 22, 2002 — October 23, 2003)
- Madeleine Meilleur (October 23, 2003 — June 13, 2016)
- Marie-France Lalonde (June 13, 2016 — July 31, 2017)

=== Ministers of Francophone Affairs ===
- Marie-France Lalonde (July 31, 2017 — June 29, 2018)
- Caroline Mulroney (June 29, 2018 — June 5, 2026)
- Natalia Kusendova-Bashta (June 5, 2026 — present)
