= Natalia Kusendova-Bashta =

Canadian politician

The Honourable Natalia Kusendova-Bashta ECO MPP
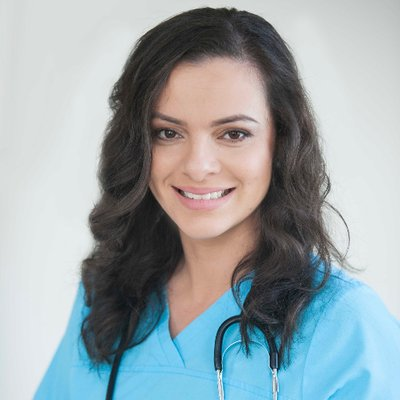
- Kusendova in 2018

Minister of Long-Term Care
- Incumbent
- Assumed office June 6, 2024
- Premier: Doug Ford
- Preceded by: Stan Cho

Minister of Francophone Affairs
- Incumbent
- Assumed office June 5, 2026
- Premier: Doug Ford
- Preceded by: Caroline Mulroney

Member of the Ontario Provincial Parliament for Mississauga Centre
- Incumbent
- Assumed office June 7, 2018
- Preceded by: First Member

Personal details
- Party: Progressive Conservative Party of Ontario
- Spouse: Mina Bashta (m. 2021)
- Children: 1
- Occupation: Nurse

Natalia Kusendova-Bashta MPP is a Canadian politician who serves as the Ontario Minister of Long-Term Care and has served as a member of the Legislative Assembly of Ontario since 2018. She represents the riding of Mississauga Centre as a member of the Progressive Conservative Party of Ontario.

Before entering politics, Kusendova-Bashta worked as a nurse.

== Background ==
Kusendova-Bashta holds Bachelor of Science degrees in human and molecular biology from the University of Toronto and in nursing from Nipissing University. In addition, she speaks five languages: English, Polish, French, Czech and Slovak. Kusendova-Bashta is of Slovak and Polish descent.

== Political career ==
Kusendova-Bashta was first elected to the Legislative Assembly of Ontario in the 2018 Ontario election.

In March 2020, while the province was under a state of emergency due to the COVID-19 pandemic in Canada, Kusendova-Bashta started taking 12-hour shifts three days per week in the emergency department at Etobicoke General Hospital. In September 2020, Kusendova-Bashta's bill to recognize the Franco-Ontarian flag as an emblem of the province of Ontario was passed by the Ontario legislature and into law.

Kusendova-Bashta was re-elected in the 2022 provincial election. On June 6, 2024, she was elevated to the executive council during a cabinet shuffle in which she was appointed Minister of Long-Term Care by Premier Doug Ford.

== Electoral record ==
2025 Ontario general election: Mississauga Centre
Party	Candidate	Votes	%	±%
Progressive Conservative	Natalia Kusendova-Bashta	16,592	46.79	+3.19
Liberal	Sumira Malik	14,561	41.06	+4.74
New Democratic	Waseem Ahmed	2,310	6.51	–5.77
Green	Robert Chan	1,028	2.90	–0.62
New Blue	Audrey Simpson	443	1.25	–0.30
None of the Above	Greg Vezina	334	0.94	+0.09
Independent	Zulfiqar Ali	195	0.55	–
Total valid votes		35,463	99.14	
Total rejected, unmarked and declined ballots		309	0.86	+0.07
Turnout		35,772	38.15	+0.01
Eligible voters		93,765		
Progressive Conservative hold		Swing		+3.96
Source: Elections Ontario

2022 Ontario general election: Mississauga Centre
Party	Candidate	Votes	%	±%
Progressive Conservative	Natalia Kusendova-Bashta	14,719	43.60	+2.74
Liberal	Sumira Malik	12,260	36.32	+10.92
New Democratic	Sarah Walji	4,148	12.29	–15.27
Green	Adriane Franklin	1,188	3.52	+0.89
New Blue	Audrey Simpson	523	1.55	–
Ontario Party	Stephanie Wright	332	0.98	–
None of the Above	Greg Vezina	288	0.85	–
Populist	Elie Diab	163	0.48	–
Moderate	Viktor Chornopyskyy	137	0.41	–0.03
Total valid votes		33,758	99.20	
Total rejected, unmarked and declined ballots		271	0.80	–0.30
Turnout		34,029	38.14	–11.65
Eligible voters		89,218		
Progressive Conservative hold		Swing		–4.09
Source: Elections Ontario

2018 Ontario general election: Mississauga Centre
Party	Candidate	Votes	%
Progressive Conservative	Natalia Kusendova	17,860	40.86
New Democratic	Laura Kaminker	12,046	27.56
Liberal	Bobbie Daid	11,102	25.40
Green	Noah Gould	1,149	2.63
Stop the New Sex-Ed Agenda	Alex Pacis	890	2.04
Libertarian	Farouk Giga	471	1.08
Moderate	Viktor Chornopyskyy	192	0.44
Total valid votes			100.0
Progressive Conservative pickup new district.			
Source: Elections Ontario
