= Bradford West Gwillimbury =

- Town (lower-tier)
- Town of Bradford West Gwillimbury
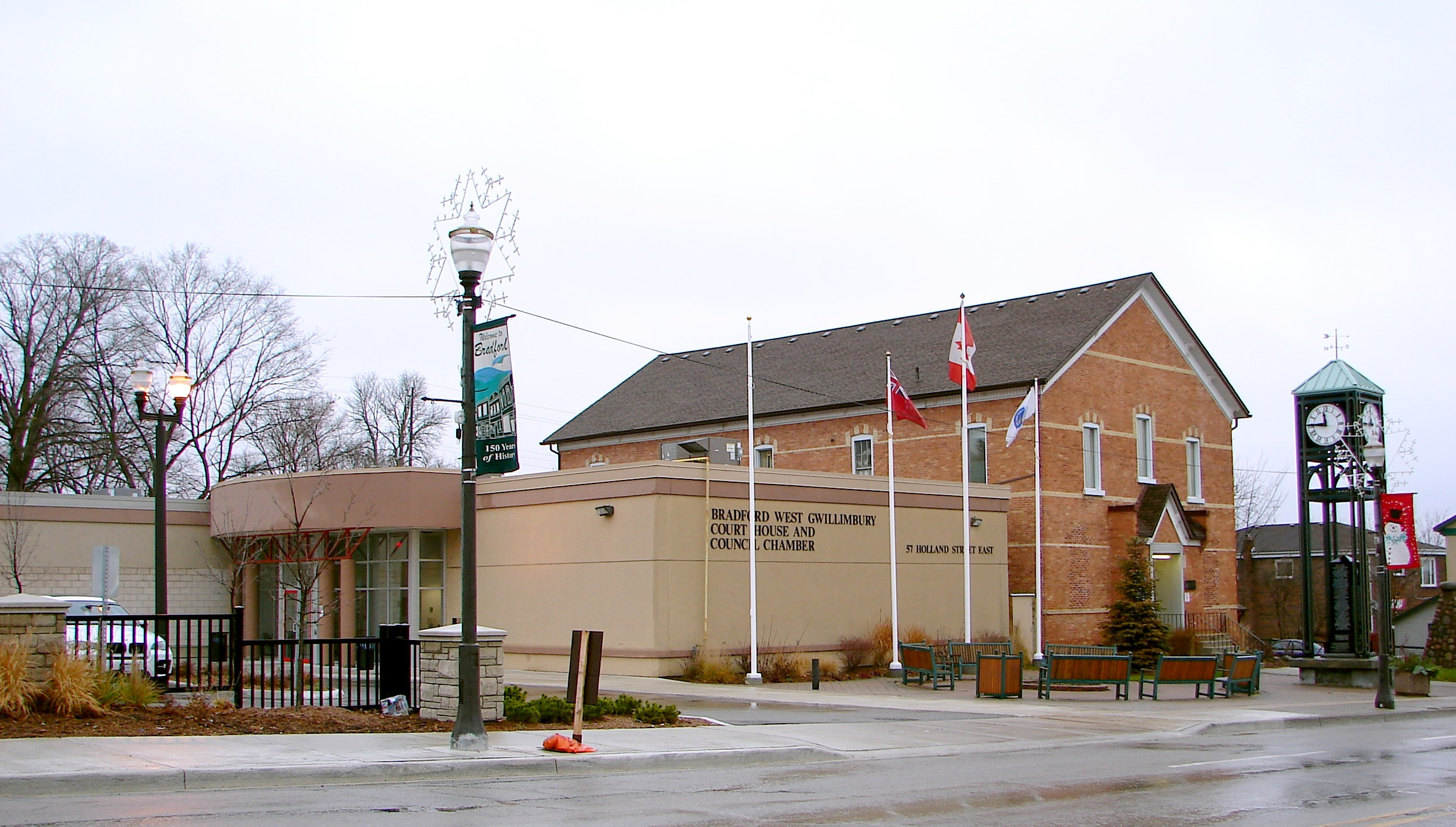
- Old Town Hall
- Motto: A Growing Tradition
- Location within Simcoe County Location within Southern Ontario
- Coordinates: 44°08′N 79°38′W
- Country: Canada
- Province: Ontario
- County: Simcoe
- Incorporated: 1991

Government
  - Mayor: James Leduc
  - MP: Scot Davidson ㅤㅤㅤㅤㅤ(Conservative)

Area
  - Land: 200.68 km^{2} (77.48 sq mi)

Population (2021)
  - Total: 42,880
  - Density: 213.7/km^{2} (553/sq mi)
- Time zone: UTC-5 (EST)
  - Summer (DST): UTC-4 (EDT)
- Postal code span: L3Z
- Area codes: 289, 905, and 705
- Website: www.townofbwg.com//

Bradford West Gwillimbury is a town in south-central Ontario, Canada, in Simcoe County in the Toronto Census Metropolitan Area (but not the Greater Toronto Area) on the Holland River. West Gwillimbury takes its name from the family of Elizabeth Simcoe, née Gwillim.

The former Town of Bradford was amalgamated with portions of the former Townships of West Gwillimbury and Tecumseth to become the Town of Bradford West Gwillimbury on January 1, 1991.

== Communities ==
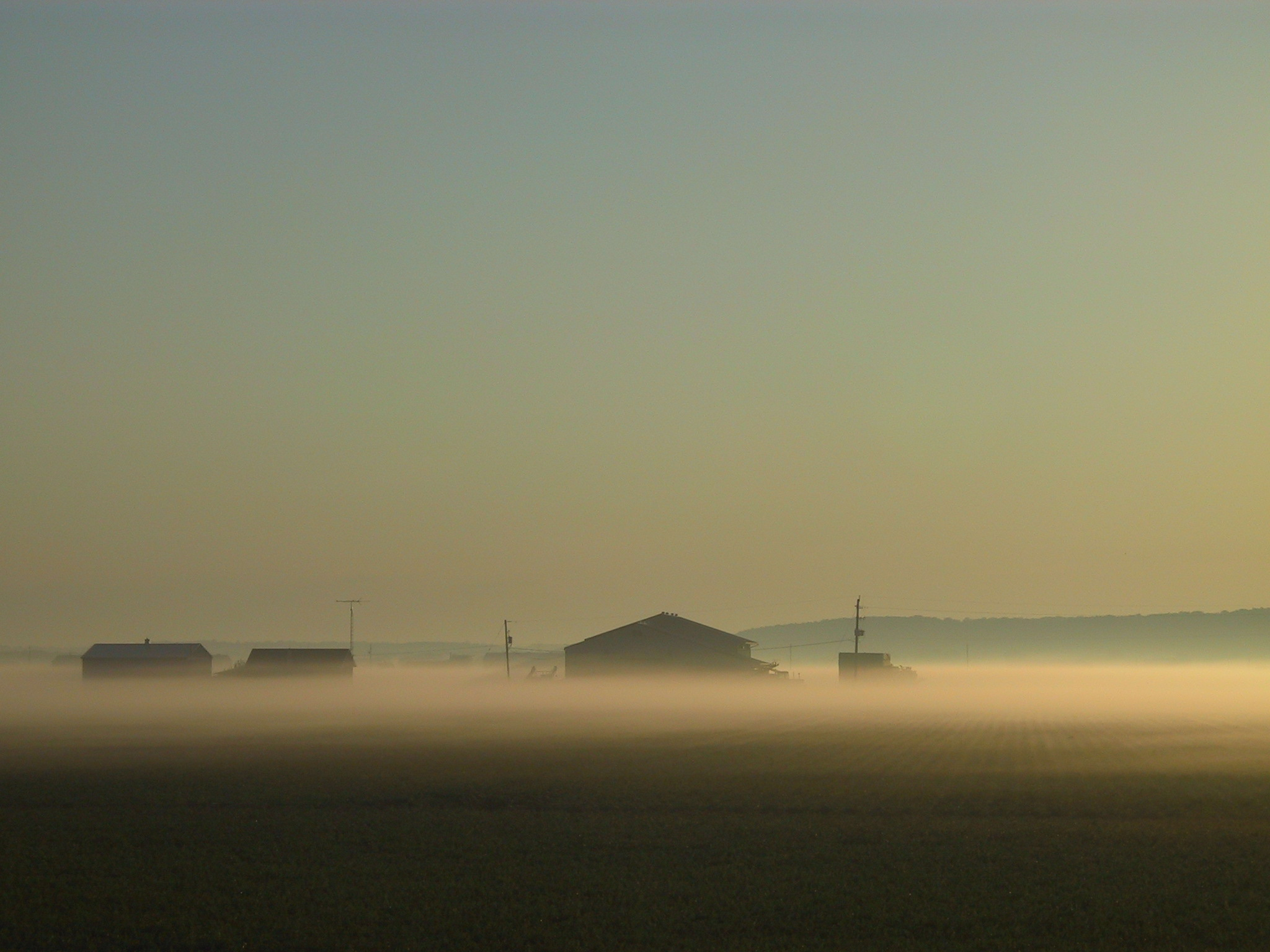
Farmhouses on the Holland Marsh

Bradford West Gwillimbury consists of the town of Bradford and the former Township of West Gwillimbury, and includes the communities of Bond Head, Coulson's Hill, Deerhurst, Dunkerron, Green Valley, Newton Robinson and Pinkerton.

Holland Marsh, a region of #9 humus soil, is located partly in Bradford West Gwillimbury. The town, along with the Township of King is the governing body responsible for the maintenance of the drainage system of this source of Canada's produce supply. In 2007 a Holland Marsh Drainage System Joint Municipal Board was created in response to a crisis of maintenance of the Holland Marsh Drainage System.

The Holland River flows through the middle of the southernmost Holland Marsh polder and eventually flows out to Lake Simcoe. Geographically, the area is north of the Oak Ridges Moraine.

== Demographics ==
In the 2021 Census of Population conducted by Statistics Canada, Bradford West Gwillimbury had a population of 42,880 living in 13,415 of its 13,907 total private dwellings, a change of 21.4% from its 2016 population of 35,325. With a land area of 200.68 km^{2} (77.48 sq mi), it had a population density of 213.7/km^{2} (553.4/sq mi) in 2021.

Canada census – Bradford West Gwillimbury community profile

	2021	2016	2011
Population	42,880 (+21.4% from 2016)	35,325 (+25.8% from 2011)	28,077 (+16.8% from 2006)
Land area	200.68 km^{2} (77.48 sq mi)	201.04 km^{2} (77.62 sq mi)	201.03 km^{2} (77.62 sq mi)
Population density	213.7/km^{2} (553/sq mi)	175.7/km^{2} (455/sq mi)	139.7/km^{2} (362/sq mi)
Median age	37.6 (M: 37.2, F: 38.0)	37.1 (M: 36.6, F: 37.6)	37.2 (M: 36.5, F: 38.0)
Private dwellings	13,907 (total) 13,415 (occupied)	11,918 (total)	9,979 (total)
Median household income	$114,000	$93,254

References: 2021 2016 2011

Historical census populations – Bradford West Gwillimbury

Year	Pop.	±%
1991	17,702	—
1996	20,213	+14.2%
2001	22,228	+10.0%
2006	24,039	+8.1%

Year	Pop.	±%
2011	28,077	+16.8%
2016	35,325	+25.8%
2021	42,880	+21.4%

Source: Statistics Canada

== Government ==
The current mayor of Bradford West Gwillimbury is James Leduc, who previously served as the town's Deputy Mayor under Rob Keffer who retired from public service in the lead-up to the 2022 Municipal Election. Raj Sandhu took Leduc's post as Deputy Mayor after serving as the Councilor for Ward 1. The first mayor was Bill de Peuter, who was mayor of Bradford from 1986 to 1990.

The municipality has a mayor, a deputy mayor, and seven councillors. The administration is led by a town manager and has the following departments: clerks, building, planning, human resources, recreation, finance, engineering, facilities and parks, fire and IT. Council shared space with a courthouse at 57 Holland Street East.

The town also incorporates the YNOT Bradford West Gwillimbury Youth Council, an assembly of teens, into its town discussions. The non-governmental group works to create social opportunities, including recreation facilities; enhance environmentalism; and create a political voice for the town's youth.

Federally, the town is part of the riding of New Tecumseth—Gwillimbury, represented by Scot Davidson of the Conservative Party, who was elected in a by-election on February 25, 2019.

Bradford West Gwillimbury federal election results
Year	Liberal		Conservative		New Democratic		Green	
2021	32%	5,109	47%	7,592	13%	2,100	0%	0
2019	30%	4,968	44%	7,263	14%	2,247	7%	1,166

Provincially, it is part of the riding of York—Simcoe, represented by Tory MPP Caroline Mulroney.

Bradford West Gwillimbury provincial election results
Year	PC		New Democratic		Liberal		Green	
2022	58%	6,470	11%	1,199	18%	1,971	6%	690
2018	58%	7,994	22%	2,985	15%	2,108	4%	596

=== Former mayors ===
List of former mayors:

- William dePeuter (1991)
- Patrick Storey (1991–1994)
- Frank Jonkman (1994–2006)
- Doug White (2006–2014)
- Robert Keffer (2014–2022)
- James Leduc (2022–present)

== Fire & emergency services ==
Fire & Emergency Services has vastly evolved from the traditional functions of fire suppression and fire prevention. In addition to structural fire calls, the Fire Suppression division responds to calls such as residential and commercial fire alarms, motor vehicle collisions, vehicle fires, specialized rescues such as technical rope, confined space, and ice-water rescues, tiered medicals (ambulance assists) hazardous material responses (HAZMAT), mutual aid requests, as well as assistance during times of natural and/or man made disasters.

Bradford West Gwillimbury Fire & Emergency Services Headquarters is located at 75 Melbourne Drive, and currently has a fleet of 6 frontline apparatus, a fire prevention van, 2 Fire Chief vehicles, and a specialized response trailer.

Even though Bradford West Gwillimbury is part of Simcoe County, the station number and apparatus numbers are based on the York Region Fire Services numbering system, thus, Bradford is District 10, Station #1 (Station 10-1).

Bradford West Gwillimbury and the neighbouring town of Innisfil share the South Simcoe Police Service.

== Transportation ==
The town is served by Highway 400 and Highway 9 at the southern border. It is also served by a number of Simcoe county roads, including 88 (Holland Street West), 4 (Bridge Street, Holland Street East, and Barrie Street), 27, 41 (Simcoe Road), and 8 (Canal Road).

The town is also located on a bus and commuter train route, served by GO Transit. Bradford GO Station is located in the community of Bradford and is on the Barrie line. The station had been the northern terminus of the line until its extension opened in December 2007.

Bradford West Gwillimbury operates a local transit service, BWG Transit, which operates two routes primarily around Bradford. The routes provide a local transit connection to the town's railway station, and the bus system operates six days a week.

== Notable people ==
- Doug Downey, Attorney General of Ontario, raised in Bond Head
- William Mulock, lawyer, businessman, educator, farmer, politician, judge, and philanthropist, credited with the formation of the modern University of Toronto, born on January 19, 1843, at Bond Head
- William Osler, noted physician, born on July 12, 1849, at Bond Head, Canada West (now Ontario)
- Bob Pulford, NHL Hall of Fame

== See also ==
- List of townships in Ontario
