= York—Simcoe (provincial electoral district) =

Provincial electoral district in Ontario, Canada

Coordinates: 44.197°N 79.458°W

Ontario electoral district
- York—Simcoe in relation to Southern Ontario ridings

Provincial electoral district
- Legislature: Legislative Assembly of Ontario
MPP
Susan Lahey
Progressive Conservative
- District created: 2006
- First contested: 2007
- Last contested: 2026

Demographics
- Population (2016): 104,015
- Electors (2018): 83,837
- Area (km²): 1,100
- Pop. density (per km²): 94.6
- Census division(s): York, Simcoe County
- Census subdivision(s): Bradford West Gwillimbury, East Gwillimbury, Georgina, King

York—Simcoe is a provincial electoral district in Ontario, Canada, that has been represented in the Legislative Assembly of Ontario since the 2007 provincial election.

It covers part of the region north of Toronto by Lake Simcoe. The riding includes the municipalities of Bradford West Gwillimbury, East Gwillimbury, Georgina, and King north of Regional Road 31. It also includes the community of the Chippewas of Georgina Island First Nation Indian Reserve.

The provincial electoral district was created prior to the 2007 election from parts of York North, Barrie—Simcoe—Bradford and a tiny part of Simcoe—Grey.

== Members of Provincial Parliament ==
York—Simcoe
Assembly	Years	Member	Party
Riding created from parts of York North, Barrie—Simcoe—Bradford and Simcoe—Grey
39th	2007–2011	Julia Munro	Progressive Conservative
40th	2011–2014	Julia Munro	Progressive Conservative
41st	2014–2018	Julia Munro	Progressive Conservative
42nd	2018–2022	Caroline Mulroney	Progressive Conservative
43rd	2022–2025	Caroline Mulroney	Progressive Conservative
44th	2025–2026	Caroline Mulroney	Progressive Conservative
44th	2026–present	Susan Lahey	Progressive Conservative

== Election results ==
Ontario provincial by-election, September 3, 2026 resignation of Caroline Mulroney
Party	Candidate	Votes	%	±%
Progressive Conservative	Susan Lahey	11,941	49.81	-9.51
Liberal	Naomi Davison	8,942	38.76	+14.86
New Democratic	Bobby Nikmard	974	4.22	-3.49
Green	Matt Pearce	642	2.78	-2.04
Libertarian	Sean Conroy	394	1.71	+0.66
New Blue	David Ghobrial	383	1.66	-0.36
Ontario Party	Gerald Auger	244	1.06	+0.30
Total valid votes		23,070		
Total rejected, unmarked, and declined ballots				
Turnout			21.00	-19.30
Eligible voters		109,883		
Progressive Conservative hold		Swing		-12.23
Source: Elections Ontario

Winning party in each polling division of York—Simcoe at the 2025 Ontario general election

2025 Ontario general election
Party	Candidate	Votes	%	±%
Progressive Conservative	Caroline Mulroney	24,705	59.40	+2.65
Liberal	Fatima Chaudhry	9,941	23.90	+6.65
New Democratic	Justin Graham	3,206	7.71	–3.44
Green	Jennifer Baron	2,006	4.82	–2.52
New Blue	Brent Fellman	841	2.02	–2.44
Libertarian	Sean Conroy	434	1.04	+0.33
Ontario Party	Alana Hollander	317	0.76	–1.14
Moderate	Franco Colavecchia	138	0.33	–0.09
Total valid votes/expense limit		41,588	99.42	–0.14
Total rejected, unmarked, and declined ballots		243	0.58	+0.14
Turnout		41,831	40.29	+1.29
Eligible voters		103,817		
Progressive Conservative hold		Swing		–2.00
Source: Elections Ontario

Winning party in each polling division of York—Simcoe at the 2022 Ontario general election

2022 Ontario general election
Party	Candidate	Votes	%	±%
Progressive Conservative	Caroline Mulroney	20,789	56.76	−0.51
Liberal	Walter Alvarez-Bardales	6,319	17.25	+3.66
New Democratic	Spencer Yang Ki	4,083	11.15	−12.28
Green	Julie Stewart	2,691	7.35	+2.52
New Blue	Brent Fellman	1,633	4.46	
Ontario Party	Alana Hollander	698	1.91	
Libertarian	Zachary Tisdale	262	0.72	+0.15
Moderate	Franco Colavecchia	153	0.42	+0.09
Total valid votes		36,628	99.56	
Total rejected, unmarked, and declined ballots		163	0.44	-0.76
Turnout		36,791	39.00	-15.92
Eligible voters		94,324		
Progressive Conservative hold		Swing		−2.08
Source(s): "Summary of Valid Votes Cast for Each Candidate" (PDF). Elections Ontario. 2022. Archived from the original on May 18, 2023.; "Statistical Summary by Electoral District" (PDF). Elections Ontario. 2022. Archived from the original on May 21, 2023.

2018 Ontario general election
Party	Candidate	Votes	%	±%
Progressive Conservative	Caroline Mulroney	26,050	57.26	+17.15
New Democratic	Dave Szollosy	10,655	23.42	+5.84
Liberal	Loralea Carruthers	6,182	13.59	-21.62
Green	Alexandra S. Zalucky	2,195	4.83	-1.39
Libertarian	Ioan Silviu Druma-Strugariu	259	0.57	-0.32
Moderate	Franco Colavecchia	150	0.33	–
Total valid votes		45,491	98.80	
Total rejected, unmarked and declined ballots		553	1.20	
Turnout		46,044	54.92	
Eligible voters		83,837		
Progressive Conservative hold		Swing		+5.65
Source: Elections Ontario

2014 general election redistributed results
Party	Vote	%
Progressive Conservative	13,768	40.11
Liberal	12,085	35.21
New Democratic	6,034	17.58
Green	2,132	6.21
Libertarian	304	0.89

2014 Ontario general election
Party	Candidate	Votes	%	±%
Progressive Conservative	Julia Munro	19,025	40.42	-12.38
Liberal	Loralea Carruthers	16,276	34.57	+10.03
New Democratic	Laura Bowman	8,420	17.88	+0.81
Green	Peter Elgie	2,946	6.26	+2.43
Libertarian	Craig Wallace	419	0.89	-0.37
Total valid votes		47,086	98.33	
Total rejected, unmarked and declined ballots		801	1.67	+1.20
Turnout		47,887	47.43	+4.62
Eligible voters		100,744		
Progressive Conservative hold		Swing		-11.20
Source: Elections Ontario

2011 Ontario general election
Party	Candidate	Votes	%	±%
Progressive Conservative	Julia Munro	20,425	52.78	+6.55
Liberal	Gloria Reszler	9,496	24.54	-6.29
New Democratic	Megan Tay	6,607	17.07	+6.93
Green	Meade Helman	1,479	3.82	-7.42
Libertarian	Craig Hodgins	489	1.26	+0.42
Freedom	Mark Harrison	201	0.52	
Total valid votes		38,697	99.53	
Total rejected, unmarked and declined ballots		183	0.47	-0.14
Turnout		38,880	42.91	-6.81
Eligible voters		90,599		
Progressive Conservative hold		Swing		+6.42
Source: Elections Ontario

2007 Ontario general election
Party	Candidate	Votes	%	±%
Progressive Conservative	Julia Munro	19,173	46.23	-6.55
Liberal	John Gilbank	12,785	30.83	-2.42
Green	Jim Reeves	4,664	11.25	
New Democratic	Nancy Morrison	4,205	10.14	+0.87
Libertarian	Caley McKibbin	348	0.84	
Family Coalition	Victor Carvalho	297	0.72	
Total valid votes		41,472	99.39	
Total rejected, unmarked and declined ballots		254	0.61	
Turnout		41,726	49.73	
Eligible voters		83,911		
Progressive Conservative hold		Swing		-2.06

2003 general election redistributed results
Party	Vote	%
Progressive Conservative	20,592	52.78
Liberal	12,972	33.25
New Democratic	3,615	9.27
Others	1,838	4.71

== 2007 electoral reform referendum ==
2007 Ontario electoral reform referendum
Side	Votes	%
First Past the Post	26,145	64.6
Mixed member proportional	14,302	35.4
Total valid votes	40,447	100.0

== See also ==
- List of Ontario provincial electoral districts
- Canadian provincial electoral districts
