= Susan Lahey =

Canadian politician

Susan Lahey MPP

Member of the Ontario Provincial Parliament for York—Simcoe
- Incumbent
- Assumed office September 3, 2026
- Preceded by: Caroline Mulroney

Councillor in East Gwillimbury
- In office 2018–2026

Personal details
- Party: Progressive Conservative

Susan Lahey is a Canadian politician who was elected as a member of Provincial Parliament (MPP) in a 2026 York—Simcoe provincial by-election. She is a member of the Progressive Conservative Party of Ontario.

== Biography ==
Lahey was previously a councillor in East Gwillimbury, elected in 2022. She is a long-term resident of York region. She is a single mother of two children.
