= Julia Munro =

Canadian politician (1942–2019)

Member of the Ontario Provincial Parliament for York—Simcoe York North (1999-2007)
- In office May 5, 1999 – June 7, 2018
- Preceded by: Frank Klees
- Succeeded by: Caroline Mulroney

Member of the Ontario Provincial Parliament for Durham—York
- In office June 8, 1995 – May 5, 1999
- Preceded by: Larry O'Connor
- Succeeded by: Riding Abolished

Personal details
- Born: Julia Ann Louise Campbell; June 30, 1942 Hamilton, Ontario, Canada
- Died: June 12, 2019 (aged 76)
- Party: Progressive Conservative
- Spouse: John Munro
- Children: daughter
- Occupation: Teacher

Julia Ann Louise Munro (née Campbell; June 30, 1942 – June 12, 2019) was a Canadian politician based in Ontario, Canada. She was a Progressive Conservative member of the Legislative Assembly of Ontario from 1995 until 2018. She represented the riding of York—Simcoe.

== Background ==
Julia Ann Louise Campbell was born in Hamilton, Ontario and raised in Toronto, receiving a Bachelor of Arts degree from the University of Toronto. She taught history in secondary school in Markham and Newmarket for 24 years. She served as a department head in one of the high schools of the York Region Board of Education. She and her husband lived on a farm near Sutton where they bred poodles, borzois and pointers.

From 1992 to 1994, she was the president of the Durham—York Progressive Conservative Association.

== Politics ==
Munro was elected to the Ontario legislature in the 1995 provincial election, defeating incumbent New Democrat Larry O'Connor in the former Durham—York riding. She was re-elected in the redistributed riding of York North in the 1999 election. The Tories lost the 2003 general election, but Munro was able to retain her seat by a reduced margin. She was re-elected in 2007, 2011 and again in 2014, albeit by her narrowest margin, in the riding of York-Simcoe.

Munro was parliamentary assistant to the premier from 1995 to 1998 in charge of promoting volunteerism and government whip from 1999 to 2001.

In 2002, Munro introduced a private member's bill to clamp down on puppy mills. Earlier, the government defeated a similar bill introduced by Liberal Mike Colle that would have licensed dog breeders and given SPCA officials the right to inspect breeding operations. Munro's bill introduced standards of care for dog breeding operations but did not call for licences or inspection rights. Critics alleged that Munro was in a conflict of interest when she introduced weaker legislation since she was a dog breeder herself. Colle said, "you don't need a licence to be a breeder, you don't get inspected. Anyone can claim to be a breeder and you don't need any qualifications." The bill was eventually passed.

She was the party's critic for the new Ontario Pension Plan, and in 2014 she was Deputy Opposition House Leader.

In January 2017, she became the longest-serving female MPP in Ontario's history.

On March 21, 2017, Munro announced she would not run for her seat again in the 2018 Ontario provincial election after 22 years in the Legislature.

== Personal life ==
Munro was married to John and lived in Georgina with their daughter. She taught Barenaked Ladies drummer Tyler Stewart at Huron Heights Secondary School. She died on June 12, 2019, at the age of 76.

== Election record ==
1999 Ontario general election: Durham—York
Party	Candidate	Votes	%
Progressive Conservative	Julia Munro	29613	61.81
Liberal	John Volpe	15755	32.89
New Democratic	Steve Saysell	2236	4.67
Natural Law	Kwok-Lin Mary Wan	305	0.64

2003 Ontario general election: York North
Party	Candidate	Votes	%	±%
Progressive Conservative	Julia Munro	24517	47.19	-14.62
Liberal	John Taylor	21054	40.53	7.64
New Democratic	Sylvia Gerl	4029	7.76	3.09
Green	Bob Burrows	1854	3.57	
Family Coalition	Simone Williams	497	0.96	

2007 Ontario general election: York—Simcoe
Party	Candidate	Votes	%
Progressive Conservative	Julia Munro	19,173	46.23
Liberal	John Gilbank	12,785	30.83
Green	Jim Reeves	4,664	11.25
New Democratic	Nancy Morrison	4,205	10.14
Libertarian	Caley McKibbin	348	0.84
Family Coalition	Victor Carvalho	297	0.72
Total valid votes		41,472	100.0

2011 Ontario general election: York—Simcoe
Party	Candidate	Votes	%	±%
Progressive Conservative	Julia Munro	20,425	52.78	+6.55
Liberal	Gloria Reszler	9,496	24.54	-6.29
New Democratic	Megan Tay	6,607	17.07	+6.93
Green	Meade Helman	1,479	3.82	-7.43
Libertarian	Craig Hodgins	489	1.26	+0.42
Freedom	Mark Harrison	201	0.52	
Total valid votes		38,697	100.00	
Total rejected, unmarked and declined ballots		183	0.47	
Turnout		38,880	42.91	
Eligible voters		90,599		
Progressive Conservative hold		Swing		+6.42
Source: Elections Ontario

2014 Ontario general election: York—Simcoe
Party	Candidate	Votes	%	±%
Progressive Conservative	Julia Munro	19,012	40.42	-12.36
Liberal	Loralea Carruthers	16,240	34.53	+9.99
New Democratic	Laura Bowman	8,411	17.88	+0.81
Green	Peter Elgie	2,952	6.28	+2.46
Libertarian	Craig Wallace	417	0.89	-0.37
Total valid votes		47,032	100.00	
Progressive Conservative hold		Swing		-11.18
Source: Elections Ontario
