= Caroline Mulroney =

Canadian politician (born 1974)

The Honourable Caroline Mulroney ECO KC
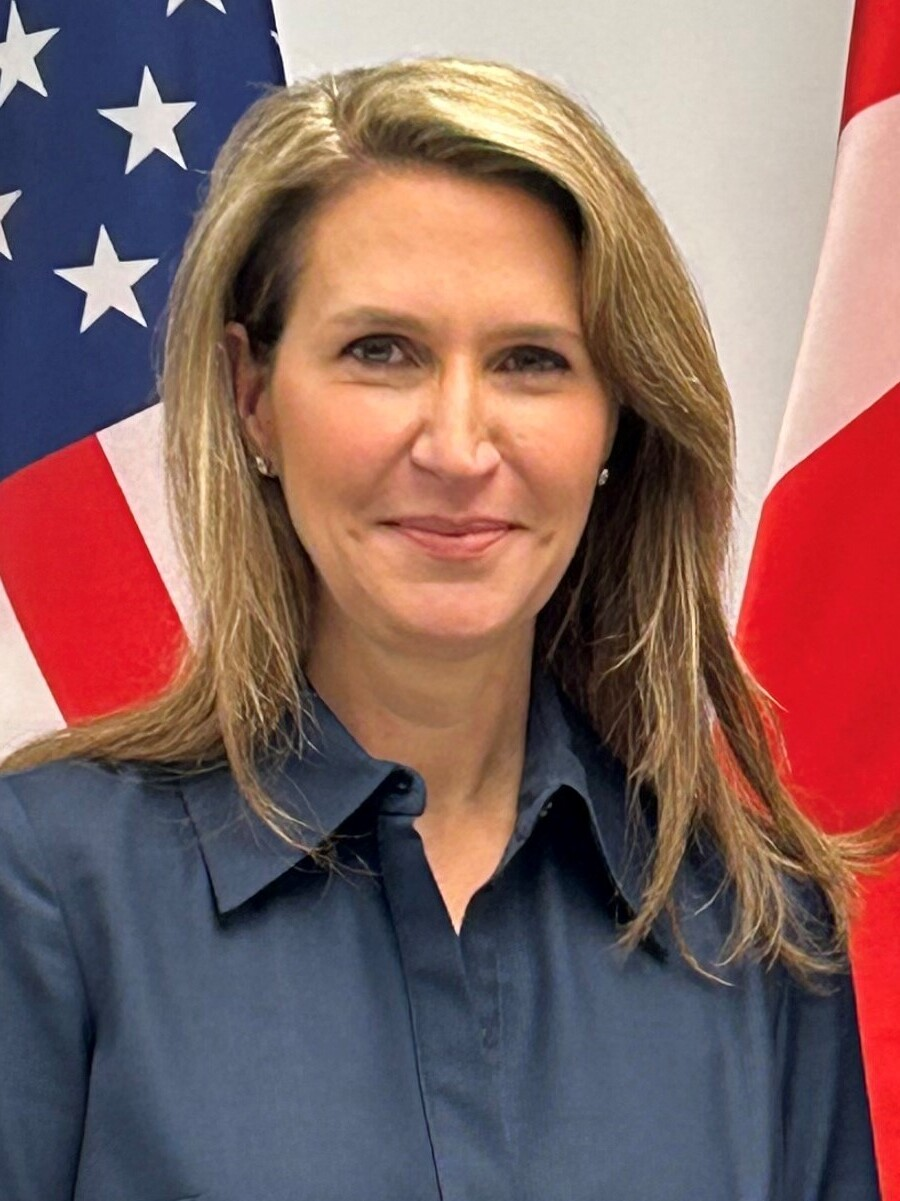
- Mulroney in 2025

President of the Treasury Board of Ontario
- In office September 5, 2023 – June 5, 2026
- Premier: Doug Ford
- Preceded by: Prabmeet Sarkaria
- Succeeded by: Peter Bethlenfalvy

Minister of Transportation
- In office June 20, 2019 – September 5, 2023
- Premier: Doug Ford
- Preceded by: Jeff Yurek
- Succeeded by: Prabmeet Sarkaria

Minister of Francophone Affairs
- In office June 29, 2018 – June 5, 2026
- Premier: Doug Ford
- Preceded by: Marie-France Lalonde
- Succeeded by: Natalia Kusendova-Bashta

Attorney General of Ontario
- In office June 29, 2018 – June 20, 2019
- Premier: Doug Ford
- Preceded by: Yasir Naqvi
- Succeeded by: Doug Downey

Member of the Ontario Provincial Parliament for York—Simcoe
- In office June 7, 2018 – June 5, 2026
- Preceded by: Julia Munro
- Succeeded by: Susan Lahey

Personal details
- Born: Caroline Anne Mulroney; June 11, 1974 (age 52) Montreal, Quebec, Canada
- Party: Progressive Conservative
- Spouse: Andrew Lapham (m. 2000)
- Children: 4
- Parents: Brian Mulroney; Mila Pivnički
- Relatives: Lewis H. Lapham (father-in-law); Ben Mulroney (brother); Jessica Mulroney (sister-in-law)
- Education: Harvard University (A.B., 1996); New York University (J.D., 2001)
- Profession: Client services and sales manager at venture fund firm, financial analyst, lawyer
- Website: Member of Provincial Parliament

Caroline Anne Mulroney Lapham ECO KC (born June 11, 1974) is a Canadian politician, businesswoman, and lawyer who served as the member of Provincial Parliament (MPP) for York—Simcoe from 2018 to 2026. A member of the Progressive Conservative Party (PC), she served in the Ford ministry in several positions.

Born in Montreal, Canada, she is the daughter of former Canadian Prime Minister Brian Mulroney and Mila Mulroney. Raised in Ottawa, she is a graduate of Harvard University and New York University and worked in the United States for 12 years until 2005, when she returned to Canada, working in financial services and became involved in charitable work. She also served on the board of directors of the Windsor–Detroit Bridge Authority. Mulroney entered politics as a candidate in the 2018 Ontario PC leadership election, placing third. She was then elected MPP in the that year's provincial election, and was re-elected in 2022 and 2025. Mulroney was appointed to Premier Doug Ford's ministry as Minister of Francophone Affairs and Attorney General in 2018, later serving as Minister of Transportation and as President of the Treasury Board. She resigned from cabinet and the legislature effective June 5.

== Early life and education ==
Mulroney is the eldest of four children and only daughter of former Prime Minister of Canada Brian Mulroney and his wife, Mila. One of her younger brothers is broadcaster Ben Mulroney. Her father won the 1983 PC leadership race on her ninth birthday. Her maternal grandfather, Dimitrije Pivnički, was a Montreal psychiatrist whose patients included Margaret Trudeau. From ages 10 to 19, she lived in 24 Sussex Drive, the home of the prime minister, and attended Lycée Claudel d'Ottawa. Her father said in his biography that he believed that she was the most like him "in her mindset". He also mentioned in an interview with La Presse that she would have been the most likely to follow his footsteps and that he "would not want to be a candidate against her".

Mulroney has an undergraduate degree in Government from Harvard and a J.D. degree from New York University School of Law. During her time in law school, she developed an interest in public-interest law and interned at the New York Attorney General's office.

Mulroney is fluent in French, English, and Spanish.

== Career ==
After university, Mulroney worked as a financial analyst at Bear Stearns. She briefly worked as a lawyer and associate at Shearman & Sterling, where she was part of the Compensation, Governance, and ERISA group. She also worked as an associate director of the NYU Center for Law & Business. On July 29, 2002, Mulroney was admitted into the New York Bar. Mulroney was reinstated as an American lawyer on September 29, 2017 after her law licence had lapsed.

In 2011, she and her three sisters-in-law, Jessica Mulroney, Vanessa Mulroney and Katy Mulroney, co-founded The Shoebox Project, a non-profit that provides toiletries to women living in shelters. In 2015, she was a blogger for the website, GoGoNews, an online newspaper for children. In addition, she has been a member of the board for the SickKids Foundation, a governor of the National Theatre School of Canada, and a member of the board of directors of the Fraser Institute. In 2015, Mulroney became vice president at BloombergSen, a Toronto investment counselling firm, until 2 August 2017, when she took a leave of absence upon announcing her candidacy.

On July 30, 2014, Minister of Transport Lisa Raitt appointed Mulroney to the Windsor–Detroit Bridge Authority, a body to oversee a second bridge across the Detroit River that separates Windsor, Ontario, from Detroit, Michigan. The authority will oversee the new bridge's $4 billion construction, and the management of the bridge, once it has been completed, including setting the bridge tolls.

Following her resignation as MPP, Mulroney joined the Royal Bank of Canada (RBC) as vice-chair.

== Political career ==
When she was 14, Mulroney campaigned for Lucien Bouchard during the 1988 Lac St. Jean by-election. After his victory, Bouchard sent her a handwritten thank-you note for her efforts in getting him elected to the PC government. She felt betrayed after Bouchard defected from her father's party to the Bloc Québécois. In 1990, she helped canvass for Ontario PC candidate Alex Burney in the 1990 Ontario election.

On September 20, 2017, she attended the ground-breaking of the Brian Mulroney Institute of Government at St. Francis Xavier University with her father and mother.

=== Speculation and entry into politics ===
On December 12, 2015, the Toronto Sun published a profile of Mulroney, in which journalist Christina Blizzard speculated as to whether her father's party would choose her as their new leader, to go head to head with Justin Trudeau, the current Prime Minister, the son of her father's old rival, Pierre Trudeau. Blizzard quoted an unnamed "Tory insider", on Mulroney's performance, when she was the surprise keynote speaker at a 2009 event celebrating the 25th anniversary of her father's administration. That unnamed source said: "She certainly has the smarts and the glamour to offset the current prime minister in any future election." Blizzard described her lack of political experience as a benefit, since she "won't wear any of the mistakes of the Stephen Harper government". Andrew MacDougall, former director of communications to Stephen Harper, noted "But there's a reason Tories—both provincially and federally—have dreamt for a Mulroney candidacy for years" because "she's the closest thing the Tories have to royalty".

When Mulroney served as joint master of ceremonies for the federal Conservative Party leadership convention in May 2017, she joked about Trudeau, "Who would want to run for their dad's old job?", but also said in a news interview, "I think politics is definitely something that I've always thought about as a career." Mulroney responded to Blizzard with an email informing her that politics is not currently her priority telling her: "While I am committed to public service and I am flattered by the suggestion, I am focused on my four young children and my work".

Patrick Brown recruited Mulroney as a star candidate for the PCs after meeting her when he helped collect donations for her charity. On August 2, 2017, Mulroney announced that she would seek the Progressive Conservative Party of Ontario nomination in the York—Simcoe constituency for the 2018 provincial election by releasing a video in which she stated that the government needs to "get out of the way", manage taxes properly and focus on affordability. She explained that she chose Mulroney as her political name because Mulroney Lapham was too long and she did not run as Caroline Lapham because, "no matter what I do, people just always call me Caroline Mulroney." On September 10, 2017, Mulroney was acclaimed the PC candidate in York—Simcoe. Her father had previously revealed that she had consulted him over a career in politics and that she had decided to enter provincial instead of federal politics to be closer to her family.

=== 2018 Ontario PC Party leadership bid ===
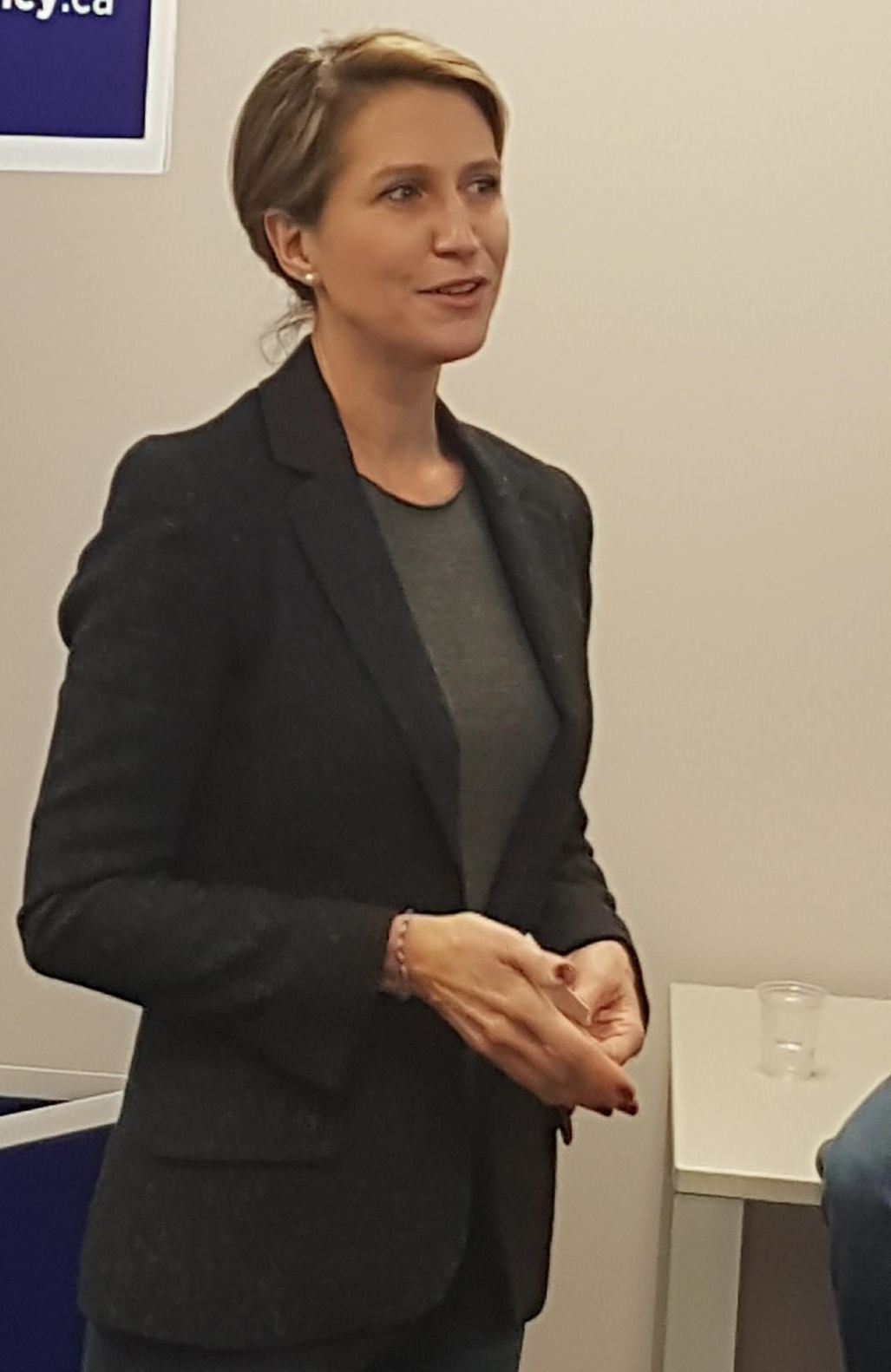
Mulroney at a leadership campaign event in 2018

Following the sudden resignation of Ontario PC leader Patrick Brown on January 25, 2018, due to allegations of sexual misconduct, Mulroney's name was raised as a possible successor.

On February 4, 2018, she declared her candidacy for the leadership of the Progressive Conservative Party of Ontario by releasing a video online. Mulroney had the most support from the federal Conservative caucus with 10 members. She was supported by at least four former Patrick Brown advisers: PC campaign chair Walied Soliman, ex-campaign manager Andrew Boddington, ad guru Dan Robertson, and strategist Hamish Marshall, the former director of controversial website The Rebel Media and the Conservative Campaign Chair for the 43rd Federal Election. Her campaign vice-chair was Derek Vanstone, Stephen Harper's former deputy chief of staff and a former Air Canada executive.

On February 4, 2018, Mulroney expressed concern to the Toronto Star that sending her children to private school might be used as political fodder, and after the leaders' debate on February 28, 2018, she walked away from the post debate scrum when being asked about why she sends her children to private schools by the Ottawa Citizen's David Reevely.

Mulroney was criticised by some, including Doug Ford, for living most of her adult life in the United States, but she dismissed that by saying: "I've lived the majority of my life in Canada and Ontario".

Also running for the leadership were Ford, Christine Elliott, Tanya Granic Allen and, for a time, Patrick Brown who registered as a candidate on February 18, 2018, before withdrawing a week later. Notwithstanding her previous statements of having "great confidence" in Brown, Mulroney tweeted disapproval of his decision to run. Mulroney urged Brown to resign from the leadership race and asked the other candidates to join her call. However, Ford and Elliott did not do so with Elliott specifically saying that the party had decided who could run for leader. Mulroney criticised Ford and Elliott for their stance.

Two workers in Mulroney's camp privately admitted to CBC News in separate conversations that she was not in the lead while two former MPs who had endorsed Mulroney, Paul Calandra and Parm Gill, moved their support to Elliott.

In the leadership election held March 10, 2018, Mulroney came in third, behind winner Doug Ford and runner-up Christine Elliott, and was eliminated after the second ballot.

=== 42nd Parliament of Ontario ===
In the 2018 Ontario election, Mulroney was elected to serve as the MPP for York—Simcoe during the 42nd Parliament of Ontario. On June 29, 2018, Premier Doug Ford appointed Mulroney to be the Attorney General of Ontario, despite never having practised law in Canada, and Minister of Francophone Affairs in his Executive Council. As Minister of Francophone Affairs, Mulroney was pivotal in the creation of l'Université de l'Ontario français, Ontario's first-ever university governed by Francophones for Francophone students. Mulroney also facilitated the modernization and first updates to Ontario's French Language Services Act in over 35 years.

Mulroney voted in support of the Ford government's September 2018 proposal to use Section 33 of the Canadian Charter of Rights and Freedoms, commonly called the "notwithstanding clause", to overrule a judge's decision that legislation intended to shrink the size of Toronto City Council was in fact in violation of Charter rights. For this position, she faced widespread condemnation from constitutional experts and politicians of all parties, particularly with respect to her duty to ensure the sanctity of the judicial process as Attorney General.

In April 2019, as Attorney General of Ontario, Mulroney led a sweeping implementation of the budget austerity measures of the Ford administration on the justice file. This included a $133 million cut to Legal Aid Ontario, cutting over 30 percent of their anticipated $456-million provincial allocation for basic access to justice services for Ontario's low-income citizens. The cuts were targeted at the community legal clinics serving the most vulnerable communities according to advocates. One group called the cuts a "directed attack" against Toronto and groups linked with challenges to the Ford political agenda.

In 2019, Mulroney was shuffled to be Minister of Transportation, and kept the Francophone Affairs portfolio.

=== 43rd Parliament of Ontario ===
Mulroney was re-elected in the 2022 Ontario general election with approximately 57% of the vote.

On June 27, 2023, Mulroney was administratively called to the bar as a lawyer in Ontario. This call was made possible by a 2021 change to the province's Barristers Act that automatically gave former Attorneys General the right to be called as lawyers. Three days later, on June 30, Mulroney was awarded the King's Counsel designation, which had been revived after having been discontinued in 1988 over its perception as a tool for rewarding political patronage rather than lawyerly skill. The honour was awarded to all lawyers in the provincial Cabinet at the time.

=== 44th Parliament of Ontario ===
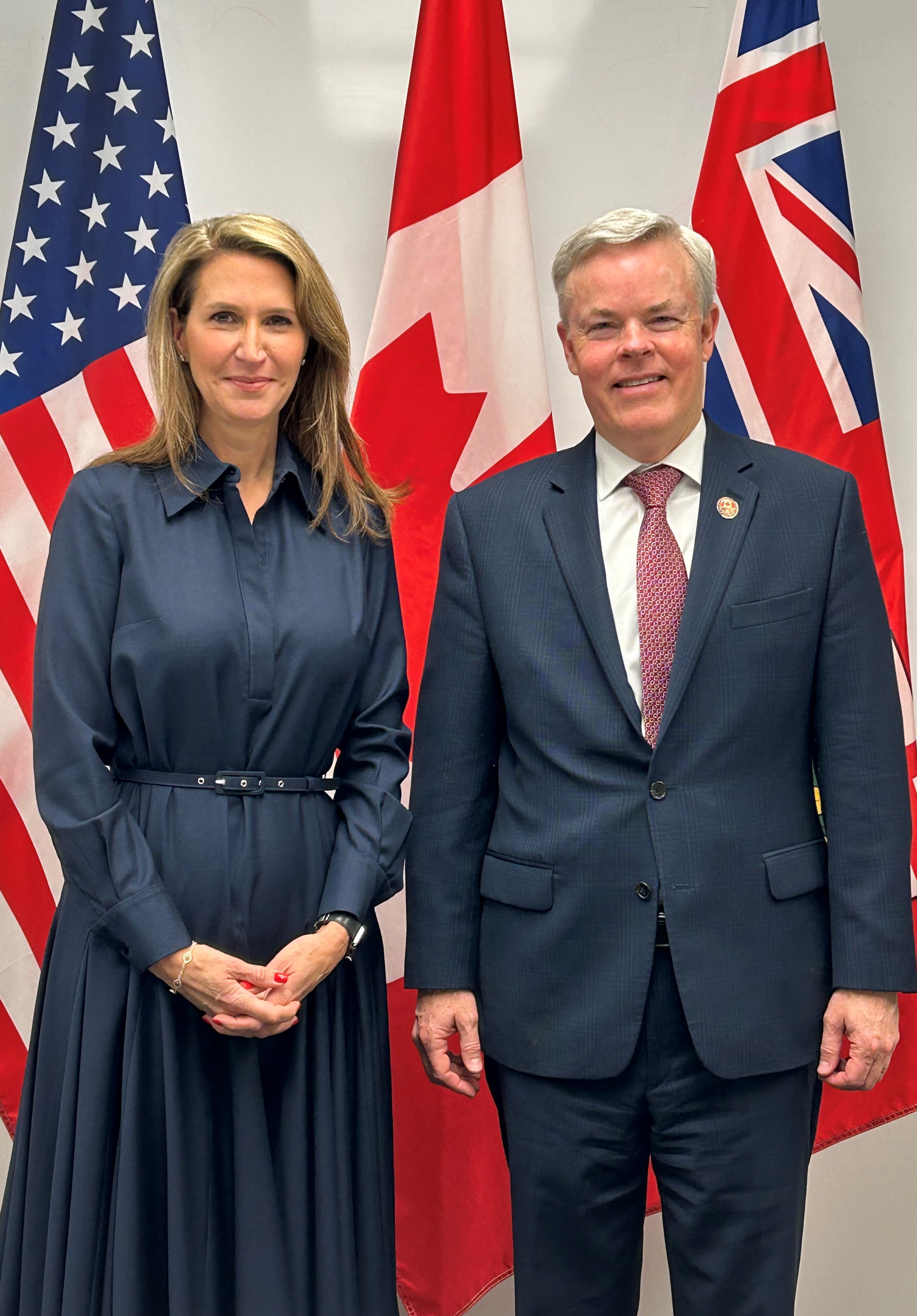
Caroline Mulroney meeting with U.S. Consul General in Toronto Baxter Hunt in May 2025

Mulroney was re-elected in the 2025 Ontario general election. She was reappointed to the Ford ministry after the election, serving until her resignation in 2026.

She endorsed Pierre Poilievre in the 2025 Canadian federal election. She introduced him at a press conference in Toronto.

== Political positions ==
After winning her riding nomination, Mulroney criticized the Liberal government for its minimum wage hike. During the leadership, Mulroney stated that she was in favour of using the "People's Guarantee" as a "starting point" for the PCPO's 2018 election campaign. She is opposed to the introduction of a carbon tax. She supports cuts in hydro rates and child care rebates. She remained committed to spending $1 billion to build Hamilton's light rail transit system, but on Dec 16, 2019, the province announced it was withdrawing the promised funding.

== Personal life ==
Mulroney is an American and Canadian dual citizen and is married to Andrew Lapham, former executive advisor at Blackstone Canada, former principal at Onex Corporation, and the son of former Harper's Magazine editor Lewis H. Lapham and grandson of Lewis A. Lapham. Mulroney and Lapham met at a blind date at a pub which was set up by one of her Harvard friends. They were married on September 16, 2000, at Church of Saint-Léon-de-Westmount in Westmount, Quebec. It was covered by The New York Times as well as Canadian media. Attendees included such notables as George H. W. Bush, Conrad Black, Queen Noor of Jordan, and Joe Clark. A young, at the time a relatively unknown singer named Michael Bublé performed at the wedding, where he was introduced to producer David Foster, who would eventually agree to produce Bublé's debut album. All attendees, including catering staff, had to sign confidentiality agreements.

Mulroney and her husband lived in the United States until 2005. She had the first of their four children on October 30, 2004, while still living in New York. In 2005, she and her family moved back to Toronto. She has two daughters and two sons.

== Election results ==
2022 Ontario general election: York—Simcoe
Party	Candidate	Votes	%	±%
Progressive Conservative	Caroline Mulroney	20,789	56.76	−0.51
Liberal	Walter Alvarez-Bardales	6,319	17.25	+3.66
New Democratic	Spencer Yang Ki	4,083	11.15	−12.28
Green	Julie Stewart	2,691	7.35	+2.52
New Blue	Brent Fellman	1,633	4.46	
Ontario Party	Alana Hollander	698	1.91	
Libertarian	Zachary Tisdale	262	0.72	+0.15
Moderate	Franco Colavecchia	153	0.42	+0.09
Total valid votes		36,628	99.56	
Total rejected, unmarked, and declined ballots		163	0.44	-0.76
Turnout		36,791	39.00	-15.92
Eligible voters		94,324		
Progressive Conservative hold		Swing		−2.08
Source(s): "Summary of Valid Votes Cast for Each Candidate" (PDF). Elections Ontario. 2022. Archived from the original on May 18, 2023.; "Statistical Summary by Electoral District" (PDF). Elections Ontario. 2022. Archived from the original on May 21, 2023.

2018 Ontario general election: York—Simcoe
Party	Candidate	Votes	%	±%
Progressive Conservative	Caroline Mulroney	26,050	57.26	+17.15
New Democratic	Dave Szollosy	10,655	23.42	+5.84
Liberal	Loralea Carruthers	6,182	13.59	-21.62
Green	Alexandra S. Zalucky	2,195	4.83	-1.39
Libertarian	Ioan Silviu Druma-Strugariu	259	0.57	-0.32
Moderate	Franco Colavecchia	150	0.33	–
Total valid votes		45,491	98.80	
Total rejected, unmarked and declined ballots		553	1.20	
Turnout		46,044	54.92	
Eligible voters		83,837		
Progressive Conservative hold		Swing		+5.65
Source: Elections Ontario

Ford ministry, Province of Ontario (2018–present)
Cabinet posts (4)
Predecessor	Office	Successor
Prabmeet Sarkaria	President of the Treasury Board; September 5, 2023 – June 5, 2026	Peter Bethlenfalvy
Jeff Yurek	Minister of Transportation; June 20, 2019 – September 3, 2023	Prabmeet Sarkaria
Yasir Naqvi	Attorney General of Ontario; June 29, 2018 – June 20, 2019	Doug Downey
Marie-France Lalonde	Minister of Francophone Affairs; June 29, 2018 – June 5, 2026	Natalia Kusendova-Bashta
