= 2026 Hamilton East—Stoney Creek provincial by-election =

2026 provincial by-election in Ontario, Canada

- September 3, 2026

Riding of Hamilton East—Stoney Creek
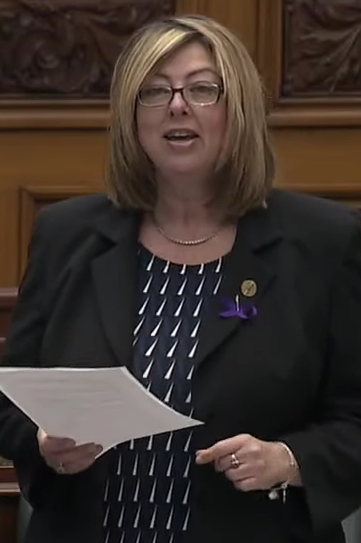
	Majority party	Minority party	Third party
	PC		Lib
Candidate	Jeff Beattie	Monique Taylor	Heino Doessing
Party	Progressive Conservative	New Democratic	Liberal
Last election	42.07%	17.60%	31.61%
Popular vote	10,500	8,886	6,334
Percentage	38.87%	32.90%	23.45%
Swing	▼3.20%	▲15.30%	▼8.16%
MPP before election
Vacant (Note: Seat last held by Neil Lumsden (Progressive Conservative).)
Progressive Conservative
Elected MPP
Jeff Beattie
Progressive Conservative

A by-election was held in the provincial riding of Hamilton East—Stoney Creek on September 3, 2026 to elect a member of the Legislative Assembly of Ontario. The by-election was caused by the resignation of Progressive Conservative MPP Neil Lumsden, who retired from public life, effective August 4, 2026.

Lumsden had represented the riding since 2022 and was re-elected in the 2025 provincial election.

The by-election was called on August 5 and was held on September 3, concurrently with by-elections in York—Simcoe and Scarborough Southwest.

== Background ==
The Ontario New Democratic Party had held Hamilton East—Stoney Creek continuously from the riding's creation in 2007 until 2022. Paul Miller won the riding for the NDP in the 2007 Ontario general election and was re-elected in 2011, 2014 and 2018. In March 2022, Miller was expelled from the NDP caucus and barred from seeking the party's nomination in the 2022 Ontario general election. He remained the incumbent MPP and sought re-election as an independent.

Neil Lumsden, a former Canadian Football League player and executive, won the riding for the Progressive Conservatives in 2022. He defeated NDP candidate Zaigham Butt and former Hamilton city councillor Jason Farr, the Liberal candidate, while Miller was also defeated in his attempt to retain the seat as an independent. Lumsden's victory ended 15 years of NDP representation in Hamilton East—Stoney Creek.

Lumsden was re-elected in 2025 with 16,401 votes, or 42.1 per cent of the vote. Liberal candidate Heino Doessing finished second with 12,323 votes (31.6 per cent), while Butt finished third for the NDP with 6,862 votes (17.6 per cent).

On July 17, 2026, Lumsden announced that he would retire from provincial politics and step down both as MPP and as Minister of Sport, effective August 4. His departure created the third pending vacancy in the legislature following the departures of Doly Begum in Scarborough Southwest and Caroline Mulroney in York—Simcoe.

Under the Legislative Assembly Act, a writ for a provincial by-election must generally be issued within six months after the Chief Electoral Officer receives the warrant for a vacancy.

== Candidates ==
On July 24, 2026, Progressive Conservative leader and premier Doug Ford announced Hamilton Ward 10 councillor Jeff Beattie as the party's candidate. Beattie, a Winona resident and local business owner, was elected to Hamilton City Council in the 2022 municipal election and had previously served as a trustee and vice-chair of the Hamilton-Wentworth District School Board.

On July 23, 2026, the Ontario Liberals selected Heino Doessing, who had been the party's candidate in the riding in the 2025 election. Doessing had placed second to Lumsden with 31.6 per cent of the vote.

On July 29, 2026, the Ontario NDP announced former Hamilton Mountain MPP Monique Taylor as its candidate. She was officially nominated on July 31. Taylor was endorsed by United Steelworkers during the campaign.

On July 28, 2026, the Green Party of Ontario announced that Pascale Marchand would be their candidate. She was the Green candidate in 2025. She works as a constituency assistant for Ward 4 councillor Tammy Hwang.

The Ontario Party candidate was Heather Curnew, the 2025 candidate for the party in the riding.

The New Blue Party of Ontario ran Wieslawa Derlatka, the 2025 candidate in the riding. She is a retired therapist.

== Opinion polling ==
Polling firm	Last date of polling	Link	PC	LIB	NDP	GPO	Others	Sample size	Lead
EKOS (Note: Poll Commissioned by CUPE Ontario.)	August 24, 2026		34	20	38	3	5	355	4

== Results ==
Ontario provincial by-election, September 3, 2026: Hamilton East—Stoney Creek
Party	Candidate	Votes	%	±%
Progressive Conservative	Jeff Beattie	10,500	38.87	–3.20
New Democratic	Monique Taylor	8,886	32.90	+15.30
Liberal	Heino Doessing	6,334	23.45	–8.16
Green	Pascale Marchand	719	2.66	–2.59
New Blue	Wieslawa Derlatka	318	1.18	–0.18
Ontario Party	Heather Curnew	254	0.94	–0.59
Total valid votes		27,011	99.47	+0.16
Total rejected, unmarked, and declined ballots		144	0.53	-0.16
Turnout		27,155	29.40	-14.42
Eligible voters		92,355		
Progressive Conservative hold		Swing		-9.25
Source: Elections Ontario

== Previous result ==
2025 Ontario general election
Party	Candidate	Votes	%	±%	Expenditures
Progressive Conservative	Neil Lumsden	16,401	42.07	+7.47	$64,086
Liberal	Heino Doessing	12,323	31.61	+10.54	$22,653
New Democratic	Zaigham Butt	6,862	17.60	–9.74	$60,575
Green	Pascale Marchand	2,049	5.26	+0.31	$8,890
Ontario Party	Heather Curnew	595	1.53	–1.46	$0
New Blue	Wieslawa Derlatka	530	1.36	–0.61	$625
Communist	Drew Garvie	223	0.57	N/A	$0
Total valid votes/expense limit		38,983	99.31	+0.65	$144,230
Total rejected, unmarked, and declined ballots		272	0.69	–0.65	
Turnout		39,255	43.97	+3.02	
Eligible voters		89,269			
Progressive Conservative hold		Swing		–1.54	
Source: Elections Ontario

== See also ==
- 2026 Scarborough Southwest provincial by-election
- 2026 York—Simcoe provincial by-election
- List of Ontario by-elections
- 44th Parliament of Ontario
