= 2022 Hamilton, Ontario, municipal election =

Canadian municipal election

2022 Hamilton municipal election
- October 24, 2022
- Turnout: 35.38%
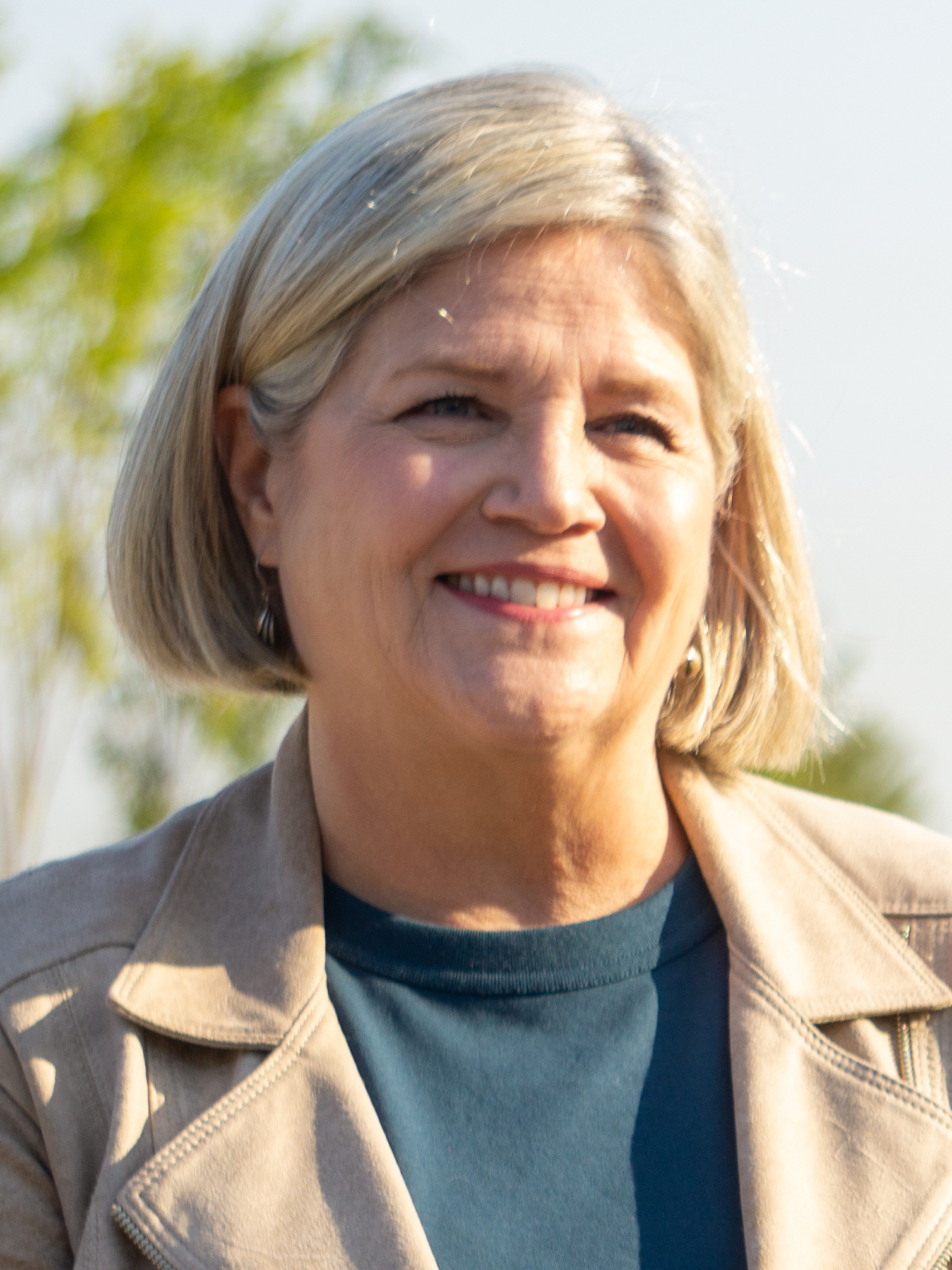

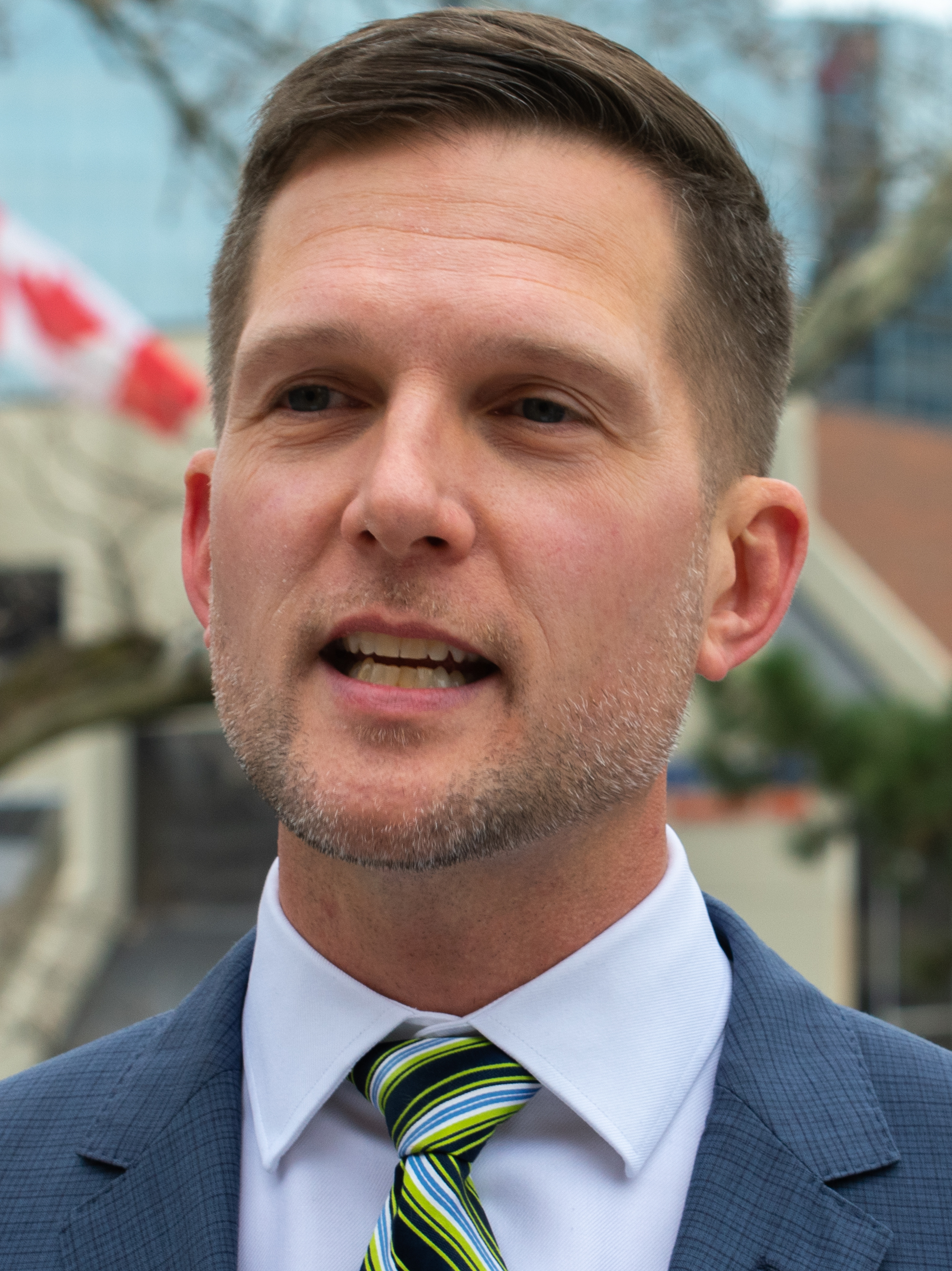

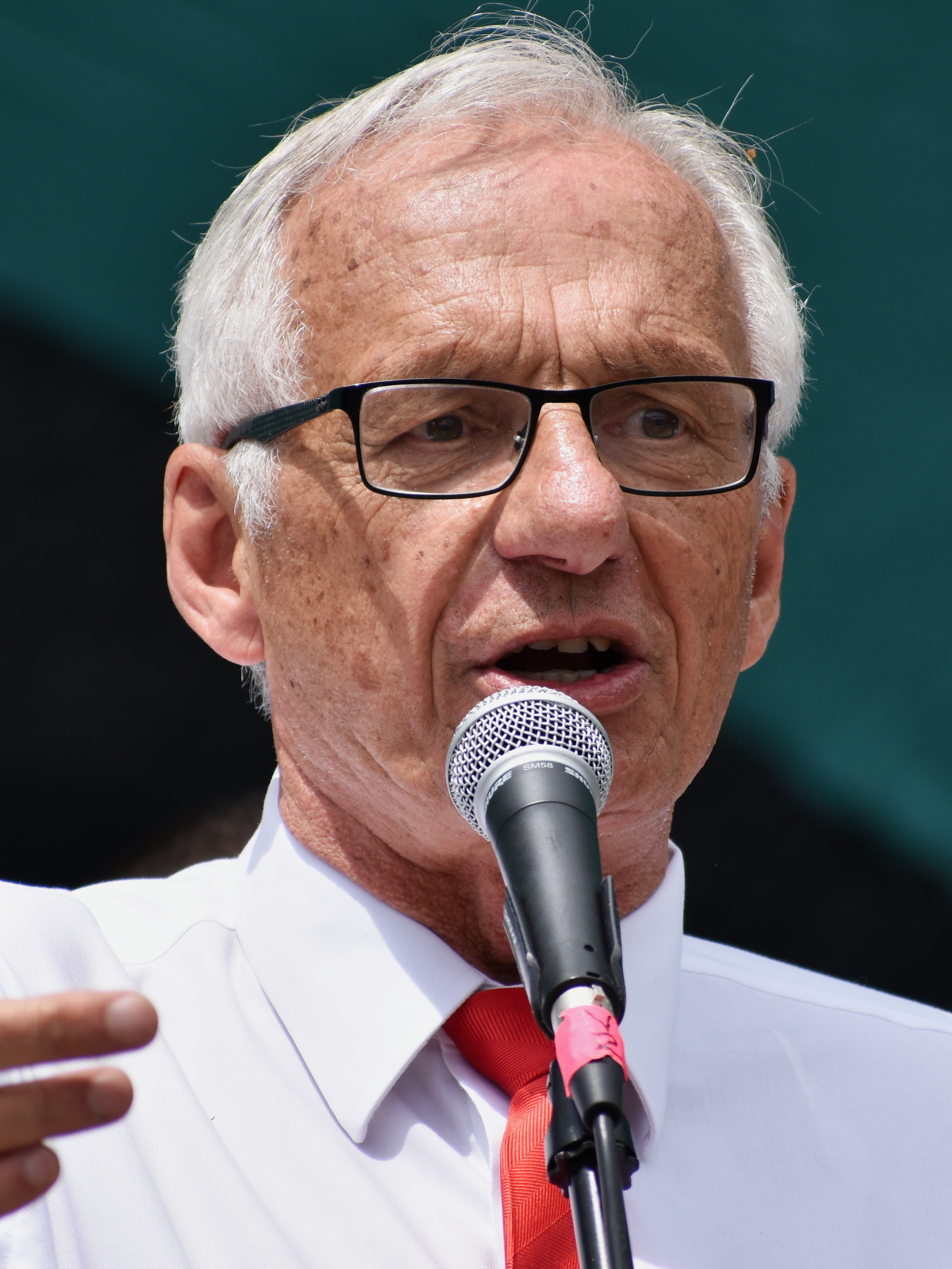
Candidate	Andrea Horwath	Keanin Loomis	Bob Bratina
Popular vote	59,216	57,553	17,436
Percentage	41.68%	40.51%	12.27%
- Results by ward
Mayor before election
Fred Eisenberger
Elected Mayor
Andrea Horwath

The 2022 Hamilton municipal election was a municipal election that occurred on 24 October 2022, as per the Ontario Municipal Elections Act, 1996. Residents of Hamilton selected one mayor, members of the Hamilton City Council, as well as members of both the English and French public and Catholic school boards using a first-past-the-post electoral system in single-member constituencies, called wards. Based on their electoral registration, voters also selected one of 11 Hamilton-Wentworth District School Board trustees, nine Hamilton-Wentworth Catholic District School Board trustees, one Conseil scolaire Viamonde trustee, or one Conseil scolaire catholique MonAvenir trustee. Hamiltonians had the options of voting in-person or through a mail-in ballot.

On election day, Hamiltonians elected Andrea Horwath to serve as mayor of the City of Hamilton. She is the first female mayor of the city. Each elected official's term began on 15 November 2022 and will end on 14 November 2026.

== Issues ==
=== Light rail transit ===
Hamilton's light rail transit (LRT) project had been a contentious issue since proposals surfaced in 2008. Supported by Hamilton city council and Metrolinx, the transit agency responsible for projects across the Toronto and Hamilton areas, the new rapid transit system was intended to ease congestion on the city's Hamilton Street Railway (HSR) system. In September 2008, a city-commissioned survey found that 94% of Hamiltonians surveyed supported investment in rapid transit, with 66% supporting LRT, 8% favouring bus rapid transit (BRT), and 20% endorsing either option.

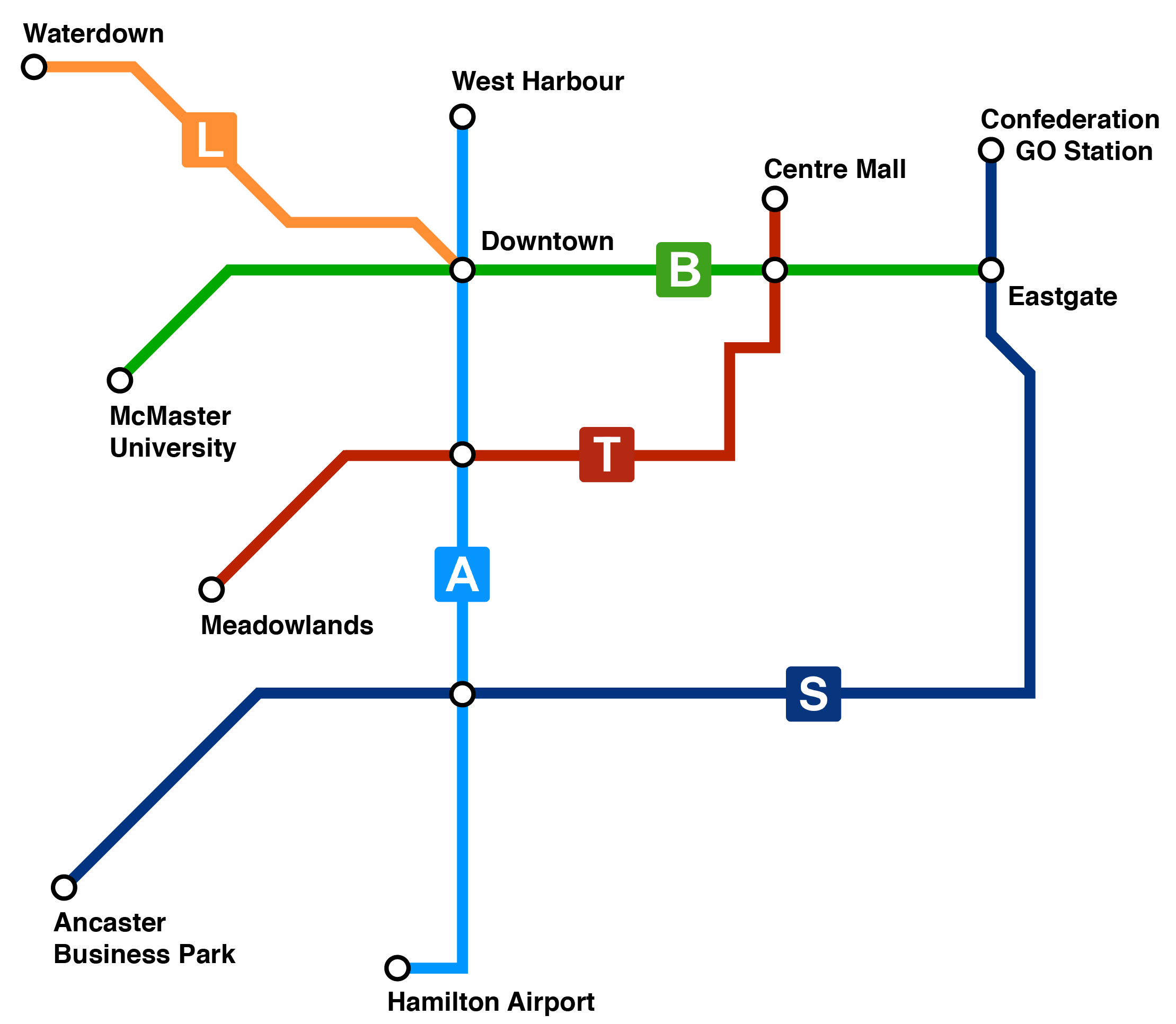
The proposed BLAST network in Hamilton

Following Doug Ford's election as premier in 2018, the provincial government maintained tacit support for the city's LRT project, with Ford telling Eisenberger, "[if you] want an LRT, [you'll] get an LRT". In a surprise move, Transportation Minister Caroline Mulroney announced in December 2019 that the province would no longer support the project, citing a new cost estimate of $5.5 billion. By August 2020, it was revealed that the revised $5.5 billion estimate was overinflated, as it included 30 years of capital and operating costs. Initial capital costs were estimated at $2.3 billion, prompting NDP leader Andrea Horwath to say "It's very clear the minister of transportation and [Premier Doug Ford] pretty much made this stuff [the new costs] up."

The provincial government suffered from notable backlash and opted to strike a task force to study alternatives to LRT. The resulting report confirmed earlier reports, indicating that LRT was a viable system, but provided the option between LRT and a bus rapid transit (BRT) system. Councillors Collins (Ward 5 - Redhill), Jackson (Ward 6 - East Mountain), Clark (Ward 9 - Upper Stoney Creek), Pearson (Ward 10 - Lower Stoney Creek), Johnson (Ward 11 - Glanbrook), Whitehead (Ward 14 - West Mountain), and Partridge (Ward 15 - Flamborough) all announced they either preferred BRT or wanted it to be studied further, while Councillor Ferguson (Ward 12 - Ancaster) indicated he was uncertain regarding either proposal. The Federal Infrastructure Minister, Catherine McKenna, indicated that, were LRT to be revived by the provincial government, the federal government would consider providing funds to the project.

In September 2020, Metrolinx announced plans to demolish 21 buildings it had purchased along King Street East between "The Delta" (the intersection of King and Main Streets) and Wellington Street in preparation for LRT construction.

During the mayor's annual State of the City address in October 2020, Eisenberger said that the province was considering reviving the LRT project, but was waiting for federal, municipal, and private-sector buy-in.

Over 13 months after announcing the project had been cancelled, the Progressive Conservative provincial government announced they were willing to fund a portion of the LRT project if funds were matched by the federal government. In May, 2021, the federal announced it would provide the necessary funding for the project to proceed with the stipulation that the full, original B-Line from Eastgate Square to McMaster University be built. The announcement from the federal government drew swift backlash from former mayor and then Hamilton East—Stoney Creek MP Bob Bratina who, despite being a member of the governing Liberal Party, remained firmly opposed to the LRT project. Less than a week after LRT funding was announced by the Liberals, Bratina announced that he would not seek re-election. A poll conducted after the announcement by LiUNA found that 54% of Hamiltonians supported the LRT while only 34% opposed the project.

On 8 September 2021, Hamilton City Council approved a "memorandum of understanding" with Metrolinx by a vote of 11 to 3, which enabled initial construction and demolition to begin, preceding full construction starting following the 2022 municipal election.

=== Commonwealth Games ===
In 2019, a group of prominent local developers and investors created the Hamilton 100 Committee - an organization seeking to bring the 2030 Commonwealth Games to Hamilton in honour of the city's hosting the first games in 1930. In April 2020, the Commonwealth Games announced that, after a bid from Calgary was rejected, no other Commonwealth city intended to bid for the games in 2026 and, should Hamilton want to host the 2026 Commonwealth Games, there would be no competition for the bid. While City Council intended to hear from the Hamilton 100 Committee (renamed Hamilton2026) in August 2020, the committee requested a delay until October 2020 to finalize their proposal. During the summer of 2020, over 500 Hamiltonians signed a petition opposing the Commonwealth Games bid. Designer Matt Jelly critiqued the plan, noting, "The city has a long waiting list for housing, and more and more in the pandemic the problem is pretty visible. It's not abstract: we either spend that money on Games or on things we actually need." Kojo Damptey of the Hamilton Centre for Civic Inclusion similarly critiqued the bid, telling The Spectator, "It's better to spend money on public health, housing, and transit, and other initiatives that will ensure the safety of residents of the city."

In October 2020, Flamborough-Glanbrook MPP Donna Skelly announced that the province was unlikely to support the city's 2026 bid as it had allocated significant resources to supporting a bid for Toronto to serve as the Canadian host city for the 2026 FIFA World Cup. Skelly encouraged the city to consider a bid in 2027 or 2030.

=== Ranked ballots and ward boundaries ===
In November 2016, councillors rejected an attempt by then councillor Matthew Green (Ward 3 - Hamilton Centre) to initiate a study into the feasibility of ranked balloting. Opponents of the plan called ranked ballots "confusing" and worried they would hinder voter turnout. Council then voted 9–5 against making any moves toward the change.

After the 2018 election, the issue was once again raised by council. During this attempt, council voted 8-7 against a move to ranked ballots for 2022. Mayor Eisenberger and Councillors Wilson (Ward 1 - Chedoke-Cootes), Farr (Ward 2 - Downtown), Nann (Ward 3 - Hamilton Centre), Merulla (Ward 4 - Hamilton East), Danko (Ward 8 - Central/West Mountain), and Clark (Ward 9 - Upper Stoney Creek) voted in favour of the move, while the remainder of council opposed the change.

A debate appeared in the Hamilton Spectator in the fall of 2020 about Hamilton's ward boundaries. New wards were created in 2018. Spectator sports columnist Scott Radley wrote that city council should move to an at-large system. Radley made the argument that an at-large system would make councillors think about the needs of different areas and discourage councillors from acting like lords or ladies of a fiefdom. PhD candidate in urban political geography Chris Erl wrote a response saying Hamilton needed to keep wards and have elected neighbourhood councils like in Los Angeles or Montreal to make it easier for women, youth, LGBT people and people of colour to run and to connect people to city government.

In October 2020, as part of the provincial government's "Supporting Ontario's Recovery Act" omnibus bill, it was announced that the right for municipalities to hold elections using a ranked ballot would be revoked. Municipal Affairs and Housing Minister Steve Clark said that "Now is not the time for municipalities to experiment with costly changes to how municipal elections are conducted". This provincial act would forcibly change London, Ontario's electoral system and prevent Hamilton from pursuing a ranked ballot.

On 28 February 2022, HWDSB trustees were provided a report by school board staff outlining issues with the board's current ward parings. Provincial legislation affords the HWDSB 11 trustees, requiring the board to combine some municipal wards to create a single trustee ward. For the 2018–2022 term, Wards 1 & 2 (West Lower City), Wards 9 & 10 (Stoney Creek), Wards 8 & 14 (West Mountain), and Wards 11 & 12 (Ancaster-Glanbrook) were combined. Population growth in Wards 1 & 2 necessitated the wards being offered their own trustees, requiring new ward parings. The trustees rejected a request by staff to select a new pairing, opting instead to offer members of the public a chance to comment on new proposed pairings. On 28 March 2022, trustees approved new ward parings, dividing Wards 1 & 2 and creating new pairings out of Wards 5 & 10 and 6 & 9.

=== Hamilton Pride violence ===
During the annual Pride Hamilton celebrations in Gage Park in June 2019, an agglomeration of anti-gay Evangelical Christian preachers, Yellow Vest protesters, and supporters of the far-right Canadian Nationalist Party converged on the Pride celebrations with the intent to incite violence. A group of activists attempted to erect a curtain between the anti-gay protesters and the Pride festivities, but were attacked. In the immediate aftermath, the Hamilton Police Service was condemned for not responding to the violence and, following the attack, arresting some of the activists attempting to shield Pride participants from the protest. In late July 2019, the Hamilton Police Service also arrested Christopher Vanderweide, a Kitchener-based ultra-nationalist and white supremacist behind much of the violence, who used a helmet to attack Pride participants Among the 'counter-protesters' arrested were Cedar Hopperton, a local anarchist activist, who Hamilton Police said was violating parole by attending the event. There was some contention as to whether Hopperton, a trans person who had previously been arrested after a vandalism spree by local anarchists on Locke Street, was actually at Pride. In response to their arrest, Hopperton began a hunger strike while held at the Hamilton-Wentworth Detention Centre. Hopperton was released from jail in July 2019 after a parole hearing found insufficient evidence to place Hopperton at Pride.

In an attempt to mend relations, Mayor Eisenberger appointed LGBT community members Deirdre Pike and Cole Gately to liaise with the city's LGBT community. This move was critiqued by Cameron Kroetsch, chair of the city's LGBTQ Advisory Committee and candidate for councillor (Ward 2 - Downtown) in 2018, who said, "There is a lot that has to happen before people are going to feel comfortable sitting down with the mayor". LGBT community members across Hamilton criticized Eisenberger's extremely delayed response to the Pride violence and the characterization by Councillor Sam Merulla that blamed people "on both sides". LGBT community activists Darren Stewart-Jones, Graham Crawford, and Chris Erl all took issue with Eisenberger's handling of the situation, with the latter critiquing the mayor's "excruciatingly slow response and lack of leadership".

An independent review of the Pride violence and of the Hamilton Police Service response was conducted by Toronto lawyer Scott Bergman. Bergman's report was released a year following the violence and condemned the police response as well as the Hamilton Police Chief, Eric Girt, for making incendiary comments following the violence. Bergman also confirmed the protesters were more numerous than in previous years, writing "There was an increased number of agitators and many were from the yellow vest movement and from more militant, hateful groups." In September 2020, Vanderweide plead guilty to assault and was sentenced to anger management counselling. Within days, Vanderweide was charged again, relating to online hate speech.

=== "Sewergate" ===
On 16 January 2019, councillors received a report from city staff describing a malfunction in the city's sewage system that allowed 24 billion litres of raw sewage to spill into Chedoke Creek and Cootes Paradise, a wetland designated as a National Historic Site. The following September, councillors received a follow-up report on the matter. The reports recommended that the public not be made aware of the incident for fear of legal action against the city. In October, the Hamilton Spectator obtained the confidential reports on the matter and published a story outlining the details, prompting the city to respond. In their response, the city noted that a gate in a sewage holding tank had been left open since January 2014 and that the city did not know why the gate had been left open for years. By December 2019, councillors had dropped an internal investigation into the identity of the 'whistleblower' who informed the Spectator of the reports and had admitted to failing to contact partners such as the City of Burlington and the Royal Botanical Gardens to notify them of the sewage spill.

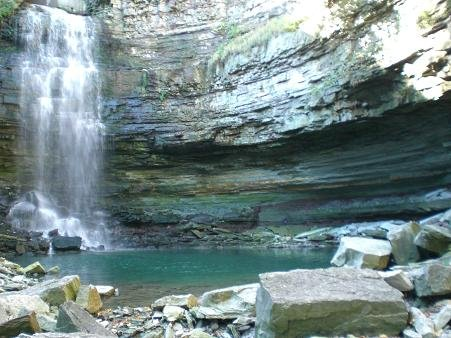
Chedoke Falls leading into Chedoke Creek

Mayor Eisenberger and council were blasted by members of the public and by Ontario NDP leader Andrea Horwath, whose Hamilton Centre riding counts Chedoke Creek as one of its borders. Despite calls for his resignation, Eisenberger instead said he intended to stay on as mayor and expressed interest in seeking a fourth term in office.

=== Hamilton-Wentworth District School Board controversies ===
On 1 August 2020, an outgoing student trustee with the HWDSB, Ahona Mehdi, published a Twitter thread in which she documented alleged racist and offensive actions on the part of a number of elected trustees during her term on the board. In this thread and at a press conference held later, Mehdi accused an unnamed trustee of using a racial slur when referring to tennis star Serena Williams. Mehdi's allegations prompted an independent investigator's review. This review concluded with a report made public in February 2021. The report, which had been altered by trustees to exclude the names of those who were investigated, acknowledged that the HWDSB had failed to create a supportive environment for Mehdi, did not find evidence that any trustee used a racial slur, acknowledged that a former chair of the board had singled Mehdi out and had deliberately or inadvertently diminished her equity-seeking voice, that another trustee had made comments about creating an Indigenous student trustee role "was not an equitable act", and that a final trustee had made anti-Muslim and racist remarks during their time on the board.

Though the report was released with the names of trustees involved redacted, the advocacy group Hamilton Students for Justice tweeted on February 4 their response to the report and named the trustees as Carole Paikin-Miller (Ward 5 - Red Hill), Kathy Archer (Ward 6 - East Mountain), Alex Johnstone (Wards 11 and 12 - Ancaster-Glanbrook), and Becky Buck (Wards 8 and 14 - West Mountain), as well as calling for their "impeachment". While the Ontario Ministry of Education announced it does not have the power to remove trustees from office, calls for the resignation of the four trustees came from then-leader of the Ontario Liberal Party, Steven Del Duca, the Afro-Canadian Caribbean Association, and both the Hamilton-Wentworth Elementary Teachers’ Local Executive and District 21 of the Ontario Secondary School Teachers’ Federation. During a special board meeting on 4 March 2021, trustees re-opened the matter and issued four sanctions against Johnstone and Paikin-Miller, namely: issuing a formal letter of censure, requesting a formal apology, requiring additional equity, governance and anti-racism training, and prohibiting the trustees from sitting on any board committees until at least the end of the calendar year. Additionally, trustees voted unanimously to recommend Paikin-Miller resign from the board for her documented Islamophobic and racist comments.

On 29 September 2020, CBC Hamilton reported that HWDSB Trustee Carole Paikin-Miller (Ward 5 - Redhill) had filed a complaint against fellow trustees Maria Felix Miller (Ward 3 - Hamilton Centre), Cam Galindo (Wards 9 and 10 - Stoney Creek) and Paul Tut (Ward 13 - Dundas), asserting that they violated the school board's code of conduct when they appeared in support of Mehdi and other former student trustees and community members speaking out against racism on the board. The three trustees named in the complaint, as well as board chair Alex Johnstone (Wards 11 and 12 - Ancaster-Glanbrook) stood in support of Mehdi and other students and, following the event, Tut also tweeted that any trustee using racist language should be removed from office. Paikin-Miller's complaint noted that the attendance of the three trustees named in the complaint violated the board's policy on "procedural fairness and unbiased process." On November 26, 2020, the board's internal investigation found no code of conduct violations had been committed.

=== Integrity and code of conduct violations ===
In September 2020, retiring councillor Sam Merulla (Ward 4 - East Hamilton) was the subject of a complaint to the city's integrity commissioner. A woman from Kitchener lodged the complaint after Merulla called the woman a "fucking punk" and threatened to "pay [her] a visit". The woman, an employee of a company that supplies weightlifting equipment, was the customer service representative handling a dispute between Merulla and her company over $300 worth of kettlebells. The woman called the police, fearing for her safety, and alleges Merulla sent threatening emails using his City of Hamilton account, which identified him as a member of council. While reporting on the story, CHCH reporter Matt Ingram asked Merulla about the complaint. Merulla proceeded to berate Ingram, saying "I refuse to be fucking exploited by you or anyone". CHCH News had previously filed an integrity commissioner complaint against Merulla in 2019 after he threatened a reporter covering the violence that occurred during Hamilton Pride 2019. On 11 December 2020, the city's Integrity Commissioner found that Merulla had violated city council's code of conduct and would be docking five days pay from the councillor. Merulla responded by saying he would challenge the "gross incompetence" of the Integrity Commissioner in court.

Councillor Terry Whitehead (Ward 14 - West Mountain), was also the subject of a complaint to the city's integrity commissioner in September 2020. In July, Whitehead sent an email to advocates for Hamilton's homeless community who had requested to appear before council. The profanity-laden email circulated on social media, with Whitehead writing "You want to tun [ sic ] Hamilton into Sanfransico [sic]? Shit, unine [sic], needles and other harmful Paraphernalia [sic] on our streets...Shelters are in place and we need to re econsider [sic] institutionalize [sic] people that are a danger to themselves." Whitehead was strongly criticized by local activists and the media, with the Spectator editorial board writing, "this seems an uncivil response to a constituent, and the fact that any elementary school teacher would give the councillor's spelling and grammar an ‘F,’ Whitehead seems to think that removing encampments removes the problem. And seems almost proud to repeat dehumanizing, degrading stereotypes about homeless people." After a complaint was submitted to the city's integrity commissioner, Whitehead dismissed the complainants as "activists" and expressed his belief that his comments and stance on the city's homeless population could make him "mayor tomorrow".

Whitehead was the subject of a second complaint after berating a member of city staff during a meeting in September 2020. The city's integrity commissioner found that Whitehead had used an “aggressive barrage of rapid-fire questions” and treated Edward Soldo, the city's transportation operations director like a “hostile witness under cross-examination.” Council voted to dock Whitehead 30 days pay in what Ward 1 Councillor Maureen Wilson called Hamilton's "Me Too moment".

On 28 September 2020, the chair of the city's LGBTQ Advisory Committee, Cameron Kroetsch announced that Hamilton City Council had filed an official complaint against him with the city's Integrity Commissioner. In May, 2019, Kroetsch had been a guest on the Bill Kelly radio show on CHML and had critiqued both the city's new appointee to the Hamilton Police Board and how the city handled the revelation that a long-time employee in the IT department had been a known and active white supremacist. Kroetsch had then tweeted minutes from the city's LGBTQ Advisory Committee that contained information the city clerk had recommended be redacted. The city's use of the Integrity Commissioner to launch an investigation of a local resident was unprecedented and was critiqued by residents as an attempt to silence dissenting voices in the city.

In December 2020, the Spectator reported that Ancaster resident Bob Maton filed an integrity complaint against councillor Lloyd Ferguson (Ward 12 - Ancaster). Maton, a Public School Trustee candidate in Wards 11 and 12 (East Stoney Creek, Ancaster, Glanbrook) in 2006, and in Ward 13 (Dundas) in 2014, as well as the Family Coalition candidate for Provincial Parliament in Ancaster-Dundas-Flamborough-Westdale in 2011, entered into a heated discussion with the Ancaster councillor over the latter's support for a townhome project in old Ancaster. Maton argued the councillor was "abusive and defamatory", while the councillor berated Maton, telling the city's planning committee meeting: "Quite frankly, you're talking like a candidate for council, not a leader of the community, and I don't like the fact that you're misleading the public." The complaint against Ferguson was dismissed by the city's Integrity Commissioner in January, 2021. While they noted the Ward 12 councillor's comments were "blunt and undiplomatic,” they also said that they “do not constitute abuse” that would be seen as a violation of the city's code of conduct.

In June 2022, council again voted to penalize Terry Whitehead. After an Integrity Commissioner report outlining Whitehead's pattern of bullying, harassing, and intimidating staff was presented to council, the body voted to dock Whitehead 15 days pay. Council also debated a motion to physically restrict Whitehead from entering City Hall due to his treatment of staff and fellow councillors, but opted to study the matter further, rather than make a decision at their 22 June council meeting.

== New election measures ==
In early January 2022, the city announced it would be offering more chances for people to vote by mail. On 14 June, CBC Hamilton confirmed a number of changes had been made to increase accessibility and provide residents more chances to vote. In addition to expanding postal voting, the city plans to place polling stations on the campuses of McMaster University and Mohawk College, provide more voting opportunities for equity-seeking groups and vulnerable populations, and start a city-wide engagement program to increase awareness about voting in the municipal election.

== Mayoral election ==
=== Campaign ===
In 2021, former mayor Bob Bratina began publicly speculating on his political future. After opting to not run for a third term as Liberal MP for Hamilton East—Stoney Creek, Bratina openly indicated he would be interested in contesting the mayoralty in 2022. In March 2022, Bratina announced that he would officially seek the office of mayor again.

Keanin Loomis, the president and CEO of the Hamilton Chamber of Commerce from 2013 to 2022, was the source of mayoral speculation in early 2021. Loomis became one of the first to announce his candidacy in January 2022. Loomis registered to run on the first day of nominations, 2 May 2022. 2014 Mayoral contender Ejaz Butt registered to run for mayor on 11 May. Mortgage broker Steven Hencze registered to run for mayor on 18 May. Hencze withdrew from the race 13 days later on 31 May.

On 14 June, Bratina formally registered to run for mayor. Speaking with the Hamilton Spectator following his registration, Bratina stressed his opposition to LRT, his desire to address the city's infrastructure deficit, and downplayed his past controversies, including his formal censure by council in 2012 after he approved a $30,000 raise for his chief of staff.

On 20 June, incumbent Mayor Fred Eisenberger announced that he would not seek another term in office. Eisenberger made the announcement during appearances on a number of local radio shows and through an interview with the Hamilton Spectator. Speaking with the Spec, Eisenberger expressed his disapproval of Bratina's candidacy and, while he noted he did not want to formally endorse anyone in the race, told CHML's Bill Kelly that Horwath, "would be an excellent choice for mayor if she decides to run.”

Former Ontario NDP leader Andrea Horwath was the subject of considerable media speculation about a potential mayoral run for years before her resignation as party leader on the night of Ontario's 2022 provincial election. On 26 July, Horwath appeared across the street from Hamilton City Hall to announce she would be filing the paperwork necessary to run for mayor. Horwath, who served as Ward 2 city councillor from 1997 to her election to provincial parliament in 2004, told The Spectator that she would push for affordable housing, tackle problems with the city's transportation system, promote transparency at city hall, and support the LRT project.

Solomon Ikhuiwu, a street-preacher who participated in the 2022 Freedom Convoy in downtown Ottawa, registered to run on 3 August.

Paul Fromm, the neo-Nazi, Holocaust-denier, and white-supremacist who ran in the 2018 election registered to run for mayor on 11 August.

On nomination day, the mayoral field expanded to nine candidates, including 2018's 4th place mayoral finisher, Jim Davis, and Michael Pattison, who finished 6th in the 2018 mayoral race and 8th in the city's 2014 mayoral race.

In early September, Bratina held a press conference to discuss his transit priorities. Altering his position, Bratina announced that he would not oppose the city's LRT project, but push for it to be run directly by the HSR, rather than by a public-private partnership. Bratina called for a review of how the HSR is operated and opposed calls to end area-rated taxation (taxation that differs based on one's home being in a formerly independent suburban community) for transit. Horwath and Loomis also clarified their transit positions, with Horwath agreeing that the city's LRT should be run by the HSR and operated by unionized staff, while Loomis maintained that such a decision should not be made before construction is underway.

On 27 September, Bratina announced that he had tested positive for COVID-19, forcing him to miss the HamiltonNext mayoral debate scheduled for that day.

=== Results ===
Candidates for the 24 October 2022 Hamilton mayoral election
Candidate	Popular vote			Expenditures
Candidate	Votes	%	±%	Expenditures
Andrea Horwath	59,216	41.68	-	$193,174.99
Keanin Loomis	57,553	40.41	-	$203,617.39
Bob Bratina	17,436	12.27	-	n/a^{1}
Ejaz Butt	1,907	1.34	-	$0
Solomon Ikhuiwu	1,867	1.31	-	$5,398.07
Jim Davis	1,433	1.01	-0.5%	n/a^{1}
Michael Pattison	1,422	1.00	+0.33%	n/a^{1}
Paul Fromm	898	0.63	+0.12%	$2,732.99
Hermiz Ishaya	326	0.23	-	$0
Total votes	142,058			
Registered voters	405,288	35.38%	-3.32%	
^{1} These candidates did not submit official financial statements, and are therefore ineligible to run in the 2026 municipal election. Note: All Hamilton municipal elections are officially non-partisan. Candidate campaign colours are based on the prominent colour used in campaign items (signs, literature, etc.) and are used as a visual differentiation between candidates.
Sources: City of Hamilton, "Nominated Candidates"

==== Potential candidates who did not run ====
Individuals listed in this section were the focus of media speculation as being possible 2022 mayoral candidates, but either ruled out a mayoral campaign or did not register by 19 August.

- David Christopherson, MP for Hamilton Centre (2004–2019); MPP for Hamilton Centre (1990–1999) and Hamilton West (1999–2003); Ward 4 city councillor (1985–1990); 2003 mayoral candidate
- Brad Clark, Ward 9 - Upper Stoney Creek councillor (2006–2014, 2018–present); MPP for Stoney Creek (1999–2003). Although considered an early contender, a scandal involving a leaked recording of Clark alleging corruption at city hall prompted the former mayoral contender to opt instead to run for re-election in Ward 9 - Upper Stoney Creek.
- Mark Cripps, managing editor, Hamilton Community News (1999–2011); Liberal Party of Ontario candidate for provincial parliament Hamilton East—Stoney Creek, 2011
- Larry Di Ianni, Stoney Creek councillor (1982–2000); Ward 10 - Lower Stoney Creek councillor (2000–2003); mayor of Hamilton (2003–2006); 2010 mayoral candidate; Liberal candidate for parliament in Hamilton East—Stoney Creek, 2008
- Fred Eisenberger, mayor of Hamilton (2006–2010, 2014–present), Ward 5 - Red Hill councillor (1991–2000)
- Jason Farr, Ward 2 - Downtown councillor (2010–2022)
- Ron Foxcroft, businessman and founder of Fox 40 International
- Sarah Jama, community organizer and activist
- Catherine McKenna, MP for Ottawa Centre (2015–2021); minister of Infrastructure and Communities (2019–2021); minister of the Environment (2015–2019). In an interview on the OShow on 19 October 2021, McKenna quelled any rumours about her candidacy. However, she did say that there are "awesome people who would be great" for the job such as "Keanin Loomis... a great advocate for the city, for businesses [and] for the LRT."
- George Rusich, 2018 mayoral candidate. While Rusich declared he would run for mayor, he opted to seek the open Ward 5 councillor's seat instead.
- Vito Sgro, 2018 mayoral candidate; Liberal Party candidate for MP in Flamborough—Glanbrook for the 2021 Canadian federal election
- Donna Skelly, Ward 7 - Central Mountain councillor (2015–2018); MPP for Flamborough—Glanbrook (2018–present)
- Terry Whitehead, Ward 14 - West Mountain councillor (2018–present); Ward 8 - West Mountain councillor (2006–2018)
- Nathalie Xian Yi Yan, 2018 mayoral candidate; Ward 6 - East Mountain council candidate in 2006 and 2010

=== Debates ===
Debates among candidates for the 2022 Hamilton mayoral election
No.	Date	Location	Host	Language	Key: P Participant A Absent (invited) A Absent (invited to provide statement) I Invited N Not invited PS Provided recorded statement A-UI Attended (uninvited, but attempted to participate)									References
No.	Date	Location	Host	Language	Bratina	Butt	Fromm	Davis	Horwath	Ikhuiwu	Ishaya	Loomis	Pattison	References
1	27 September 2022	Carmen's Banquet Centre	HamiltonNext (West End Homebuilders Association, Realtors Association of Hamilton-Burlington, and the Hamilton Halton Construction Association)	English	A	N	N	N	P	N	N	P	N	
2	27 September 2022	The Westdale Theatre; King Street West	Cable 14 and The Hamilton Spectator	English	PS	PS	PS	A	P	PS	PS	P	PS	
3	5 October 2022	Perkins Centre; Main Street East	Hamilton not-for-profit housing providers (YWCA, Habitat for Humanity, Indwell, Kiwanis Homes, Sacagawea Non-Profit Housing, Good Shepherd, and Victoria Park Community Homes)	English	P	N	N	N	P	N	N	P	A-UI	
4	11 October 2022	McMaster Innovation Park, Longwood Road South	The Neighbourhood Associations of Ward 1, the Westdale Village BIA, and Locke Street BIA	English	P	N	N	N	P	N	N	P	N	
5	17 October 2022	McMaster Student Centre, McMaster University	McMaster Students Union	English	A	P	A	A	A	P	A	P	P	

=== Endorsements ===
	Bratina	Horwath	Loomis
City councillors		Sam Merulla (Ward 4 - Hamilton East, 2000–2022)	
City council candidates			
Federal politicians	Dan Muys (Conservative MP, Flamborough—Glanbrook)		
Provincial politicians		Monique Taylor (NDP MPP, Hamilton Mountain); Sandy Shaw (NDP MPP, Hamilton West-Ancaster-Dundas)	
Other municipal politicians			Walter Sendzik (outgoing mayor of St. Catharines)
Former politicians	Vito Sgro (2018 mayoral candidate; 2021 Liberal candidate for MP, Flamborough—Glanbrook)	Sheila Copps (deputy prime minister of Canada, 1993–1997; Liberal MP for Hamilton East, 1984–2004; daughter of former mayor Vic Copps); Larry Di Ianni (mayor of Hamilton, 2003–2006; Ward 10 councillor, 2000–2003; Stoney Creek councillor 1982–2000; 2008 Liberal candidate for MP in Hamilton East-Stoney Creek); Robert Pasuta (Ward 14 - Wentworth councillor, 2006–2018)	Catherine McKenna (Liberal MP, Ottawa Centre, 2015–2021); Robert E. Wade (last mayor of Ancaster, 1984–2000; mayor of Hamilton, 2000–2003); Rick Goldring (former mayor of Burlington, 2010–2018)
Media			Laura Babcock (local podcaster)
Labour	Amalgamated Transit Union Local 107 (HSR workers' union) (Note: While the national ATU leadership endorsed Horwath, ATU Local 107 vice-president Rob Doucette said that Bratina "edged out" Horwath for their endorsement, but that "...we'd be happy to work with either one of them.")	Hamilton and District Labour Council; Amalgamated Transit Union; Hamilton Professional Firefighters Association Local 288	Laborers' International Union of North America (LIUNA); United Steelworkers Local 7135 (National Steelcar)
Other		Tom Wilson (musician); Evelyn Myrie (anti-racism advocate, president of the Afro Canadian Caribbean Association)	House of Adam and Steve (Hamilton-based LGBTQ+ entertainment promoters)

=== Polling ===
Mayoral candidates
Polling firm	Date of polling	Sample size	Horwath	Loomis	Bratina	Butt	Other	Undecided	Ref.
Results	24 October 2022	Valid votes	41.68%	40.41%	12.27%	1.34%	4.18%	–	–
Mainstreet Research	17 October 2022	694	36.5%	28.7%	12.1%	2.8%	–	20%	
Mainstreet Research	27 July 2022	–	37%	14%	13%	–	–	35%	

== City council elections ==
=== Ward 1 - Chedoke-Cootes ===
Ward 1's incumbent councillor, Maureen Wilson, was first elected in 2018 and, in early 2022, declared an intention to seek re-election. Wilson officially registered on 26 May.

Ian MacPherson registered to run on 12 May. MacPerson studied social psychology at McMaster and uses a wheelchair, connected to his living with Pompe Disease. MacPherson's campaign focused on his opposition to the proposed conversion of Main Street from one-way to two-way traffic, support for building tiny shelters for those experiencing homelessness, and opposing what he called "overspending" at city hall.

John Vail, 2014 Progressive Conservative candidate for MPP in Hamilton Centre and candidate for Ward 2 councillor in 2014 and 2018, registered to run for Ward 1 councillor on 18 August. In his registration, he listed a Ward 2 address as his home. Early in the campaign, Vail delivered fliers to Ward 1 homes accusing Wilson of secrecy, supporting the Defund The Police movement, and divisive behaviour on council. The flyer outlined Vail's positions, which included managing potential LRT disruptions, opposing "gentle density", supporting local business, and promoting local heritage.

On election night, Wilson won the ward easily, earning nearly 75% of the vote. Speaking with The Spectator about her win, Wilson said “Residents were telling me that they liked my style of leadership...they are expecting a new tone of civility and respect at city hall."

Candidates for the 24 October 2022 Hamilton Ward 1 councillor election
Candidate	Popular vote			Expenditures
Candidate	Votes	%	±%	Expenditures
Maureen Wilson (incumbent)	6,610	74.96	+33.45%	
Ian MacPherson	1,386	15.72	-	
John Vail	822	9.32	-	
Total votes	8,818			
Registered voters				
Note: All Hamilton municipal elections are officially non-partisan. Note: Candidate campaign colours are based on the prominent colour used in campaign items (signs, literature, etc.) and are used as a visual differentiation between candidates.
Sources: City of Hamilton, "Nominated Candidates"

=== Ward 2 - Downtown ===
Ward 2's incumbent councillor, Jason Farr, was first elected in 2010. In January, local media speculated that Farr might seek the Ontario Liberal Party nomination for provincial parliament in Hamilton East-Stoney Creek in the 2022 Ontario Election. This was confirmed when the Ontario Liberals announced that Farr would be acclaimed as their candidate at a meeting on 19 April 2022. Farr was beaten by Neil Lumsden and was subsequently the source of speculation around a possible run for mayor. Despite this, Farr registered to run for re-election on 10 August. Announcing his decision on Twitter, Farr said he would focus on downtown revitalization, improved policing, and building affordable housing in the city's core.

Cameron Kroetsch, who ran in Ward 2 in 2018, announced his candidacy in January 2022. Kroetsch was one of the first candidates to register on 2 May. Kroetsch received an endorsement from the Hamilton and District Labour Council during the campaign.

Local artist Raquel Rakovac registered to run for Ward 2 councillor on 9 June.

Candidates for the 24 October 2022 Hamilton Ward 2 councillor election
Candidate	Popular vote			Expenditures
Candidate	Votes	%	±%	Expenditures
Cameron Kroetsch	3,619	49.25	+19.26%	
Jason Farr (incumbent)	2,412	32.83	-14.03%	
Raquel Rakovac	730	9.93	-	
Robin McKee	375	5.10	-	
Shahan Aaron	212	2.89	-	
Total votes	7,348			
Registered voters				
Note: All Hamilton municipal elections are officially non-partisan. Note: Candidate campaign colours are based on the prominent colour used in campaign items (signs, literature, etc.) and are used as a visual differentiation between candidates.
Sources: City of Hamilton, "Nominated Candidates"

=== Ward 3 - Hamilton Centre ===
Ward 3's incumbent councillor, Nrinder Nann, was first elected in 2018. Nann registered for re-election on 26 May.

On 25 May, local journalist Joey Coleman reported that the 2018 runner-up in the Ward 3 councillor race, Laura Farr, had been granted a leave of absence from her job with the federal government in order to seek the Ward 3 councillor's seat again. Farr officially registered for the seat on 31 May. Nann was the only sitting councillor to earn an endorsement from the Hamilton and District Labour Council during the campaign.

Candidates for the 24 October 2022 Hamilton Ward 3 councillor election
Candidate	Popular vote			Expenditures
Candidate	Votes	%	±%	Expenditures
Nrinder Nann (incumbent)	4,334	50.33	+16.35%	
Walter Furlan	2,948	34.23	-	
Laura Farr	1,010	11.73	-7.35%	
Michael Falletta	220	2.55	-	
Stan Kruchka	100	1.16	-	
Total votes	8,612			
Registered voters				
Note: All Hamilton municipal elections are officially non-partisan. Note: Candidate campaign colours are based on the prominent colour used in campaign items (signs, literature, etc.) and are used as a visual differentiation between candidates.
Sources: City of Hamilton, "Nominated Candidates"

=== Ward 4 - Hamilton East ===
Ward 4's incumbent councillor, Sam Merulla, was first elected in 2000. Merulla announced his intention to retire in 2020.

On the first day of nominations, incumbent Wards 11 & 12 (Ancaster-Glanbrook) HWDSB trustee Alex Johnstone registered for the Ward 4 councillor election. In a campaign launch video, Johnstone indicated she had actually lived in Ward 4 for six years.

On the same day, doctoral candidate Angelica Hasbon registered to run.

On 14 May, Max Francis of the "True Hamiltonian" clothing brand announced that he would be running for the Ward 4 seat. Francis generated controversy on 30 August when he posted a photo to Twitter posing with members of the Hamilton Police Service. In the post, Francis referred to himself as a "law and order" candidate. The post drew backlash from the community and prompted the Hamilton Police Service to issue a statement indicating they do not support any candidates in the election. Francis subsequently deleted the post.

President of the HSR's union, ATU Local 107, Eric Tuck, registered to seek the seat on 5 July and was endorsed by the Hamilton and District Labour Council.

Candidates for the 24 October 2022 Hamilton Ward 4 councillor election
Candidate	Popular vote			Expenditures
Candidate	Votes	%	±%	Expenditures
Tammy Hwang	2,101	23.00	-	
Eric Tuck	1,816	19.88	-	
Alex Johnstone	1,585	17.35	-	
Angelica Hasbon	1,128	12.35	-	
Maxwell Francis	742	8.12	-	
Adam Oldfield	520	5.69	-	
Pascale Marchand	510	5.58	-	
Laura Taylor	253	2.77	-	
Cindy Louise Kennedy	251	2.75	-	
Robert Paris	163	1.78	-	
Mary Louise Williams	67	0.73	-	
Total votes	9,136			
Registered voters				
Note: All Hamilton municipal elections are officially non-partisan. Note: Candidate campaign colours are based on the prominent colour used in campaign items (signs, literature, etc.) and are used as a visual differentiation between candidates.
Sources: City of Hamilton, "Nominated Candidates"

=== Ward 5 - Red Hill ===
Ward 5's incumbent councillor, Russ Powers, was appointed to the position in 2021. Powers stated he will not run for election in 2022.

The first candidate to register in Ward 5 was Matt Francis, a former city worker who campaigned to keep piers in Burlington accessible to the public and supported former councillor Chad Collins. Francis, who previously worked for the city, indicated his campaign priorities would be the redevelopment of Eastgate Square, avoiding cost overruns on the city's LRT project, and protecting free parking in downtown Stoney Creek.

Bob Hurst, who sought the late-term appointment to the seat after Collins' election to parliament, registered on 13 May.

Kevin Geenen, a local political activist and journalist, registered to run on 6 July. Geenen, who supported Leslyn Lewis in the 2020 Conservative Party of Canada leadership election and indicated he considered seeking the Ontario Progressive Conservative Party nomination to run in the 2022 Ontario election, told the Stoney Creek News that his priorities would include increased resident consultation, a faster opening to the Centennial GO Station, and more waterfront development.

Sebastian Aleda, the 2022 Ontario Party candidate in Burlington, registered on 8 July.

On 27 July, local environmentalist and candidate for Ward 4 councillor in 2003, Lynda Lukasik, announced that she would run for the open Ward 5 seat. Lukasik earned the backing of the Hamilton and District Labour Council.

Candidates for the 24 October 2022 Hamilton Ward 5 councillor election
Candidate	Popular vote			Expenditures
Candidate	Votes	%	±%	Expenditures
Matt Francis	4,239	43.61	-	
Lynda Lukasik	1,598	16.44	-	
Krysta Boyer	1,234	12.70	-	
George Rusich	781	8.03	-	
Kevin Geenen	374	3.85	-	
Gordon Noble	333	3.43	-	
Bob Hurst	331	2.41	-	
Ryan Ladner	313	3.22	-	
Angela Pugliese	241	2.48	-	
Sebastian Aldea	145	1.49	-	
Stan Habza	131	1.35	-	
Total votes	9,720			
Registered voters				
Note: All Hamilton municipal elections are officially non-partisan. Note: Candidate campaign colours are based on the prominent colour used in campaign items (signs, literature, etc.) and are used as a visual differentiation between candidates.
Sources: City of Hamilton, "Nominated Candidates"

=== Ward 6 - East Mountain ===
Ward 6's incumbent councillor, Tom Jackson, was first elected in 1988. Jackson indicated to the Hamilton Mountain News that he would be seeking re-election for an eleventh consecutive term in 2022. Jackson registered on 12 July.

Candidates for the 24 October 2022 Hamilton Ward 6 councillor election
Candidate	Popular vote			Expenditures
Candidate	Votes	%	±%	Expenditures
Tom Jackson (incumbent)	6,326	63.45	-18.81%	
Chris Slye	1,539	15.44	-	
Donna Puddu	1,310	13.14	-	
Dan Preston	450	4.51	-	
Stefan Spolnik	345	3.46	-	
Total votes	9,970			
Registered voters				
Note: All Hamilton municipal elections are officially non-partisan. Note: Candidate campaign colours are based on the prominent colour used in campaign items (signs, literature, etc.) and are used as a visual differentiation between candidates.
Sources: City of Hamilton, "Nominated Candidates"

=== Ward 7 - Central Mountain ===
Ward 7's incumbent councillor, Esther Pauls, was first elected in 2018. She indicated to the Hamilton Mountain News she anticipated seeking re-election in 2022. Pauls registered for re-election on 3 May 2022.

On 13 June, Scott Duvall, who served as Ward 7 councillor from 2006 to 2015 and as Hamilton Mountain MP from 2015 to 2021, registered to run for council in Ward 7. Duvall received the backing of the Hamilton and District Labour Council in his bid to return to council.

Candidates for the 24 October 2022 Hamilton Ward 7 councillor election
Candidate	Popular vote			Expenditures
Candidate	Votes	%	±%	Expenditures
Esther Pauls (incumbent)	6,043	50.91	+25.91%	
Scott Duvall	5,826	49.09	-	
Total votes	11,869			
Registered voters				
Note: All Hamilton municipal elections are officially non-partisan. Note: Candidate campaign colours are based on the prominent colour used in campaign items (signs, literature, etc.) and are used as a visual differentiation between candidates.
Sources: City of Hamilton, "Nominated Candidates"

=== Ward 8- West/Central Mountain ===
Ward 8's incumbent councillor, John-Paul Danko, was first elected in 2018, and told the Hamilton Mountain News he would seek re-election in 2022. Danko registered for re-election on 26 May.

On 16 May, Antony Frisina, a member of the city's Advisory Committee for Persons with Disabilities, filed to run for Ward 8 councillor. Frisina, a previous winner of the Order of Hamilton, told CBC Hamilton he is not unhappy with Danko's work, but wants to see the city do more for those living with disabilities.

Candidates for the 24 October 2022 Hamilton Ward 8 councillor election
Candidate	Popular vote			Expenditures
Candidate	Votes	%	±%	Expenditures
John-Paul Danko (incumbent)	5,274	62.18	+20.51%	
Sonia Brown	1,936	22.82	-	
Anthony Frisina	634	7.47	-	
Joshua Czerniga	413	4.87	-	
Daniel Veltri	225	2.65	-	
Total votes	8,482			
Registered voters				
Note: All Hamilton municipal elections are officially non-partisan. Note: Candidate campaign colours are based on the prominent colour used in campaign items (signs, literature, etc.) and are used as a visual differentiation between candidates.
Sources: City of Hamilton, "Nominated Candidates"

=== Ward 9 - Upper Stoney Creek ===
Ward 9's incumbent councillor, Brad Clark, served as councillor from 2006 to 2014, sought the office of mayor in 2014, and was elected as Ward 9's councillor again in 2018. While Clark's name was originally presented as a potential mayoral candidate, Clark announced that he would seek re-election and registered for the seat on 30 June. Peter Lanza, who sought the Ward 9 council seat in 2018, registered on 28 July. Walt Juchniewicz, the Ontario Party's candidate in Flamborough—Glanbrook in the 2022 Ontario general election and former member of the Hamilton Police Services Board, registered the following day.

Candidates for the 24 October 2022 Hamilton Ward 9 councillor election
Candidate	Popular vote			Expenditures
Candidate	Votes	%	±%	Expenditures
Brad Clark (incumbent)	3,622	51.56	+12.83%	
Peter Lanza	2,462	35.05	+11.73%	
Muhammad Naeem	595	8.47	-	
Walt Juchniewicz	346	4.93	-	
Total votes	7,025			
Registered voters				
Note: All Hamilton municipal elections are officially non-partisan. Note: Candidate campaign colours are based on the prominent colour used in campaign items (signs, literature, etc.) and are used as a visual differentiation between candidates.
Sources: City of Hamilton, "Nominated Candidates"

Declined or ineligible:

- Doug Conely, Ward 9 - Upper Stoney Creek councillor (2014–2018)

=== Ward 10 - Lower Stoney Creek ===
Ward 10's incumbent councillor, Maria Pearson, was first elected in 2003 and said she would seek re-election in 2022.

In January 2022, Jeff Beattie, the former HWDSB School Board Trustee for Wards 9 & 10, Stoney Creek (2014–2018) and council candidate in 2018 announced that he would once again seek election in Ward 10.

2018 runner-up, Louie Milojevic, registered to run again on 5 August.

Candidates for the 24 October 2022 Hamilton Ward 10 councillor election
Candidate	Popular vote			Expenditures
Candidate	Votes	%	±%	Expenditures
Jeff Beattie	4,236	39.69	+15.16%	
Louie Milojevic	3,436	32.20	+4.95%	
Maria Pearson (incumbent)	3,000	28.11	-8.23%	
Total votes	10,672			
Registered voters				
Note: All Hamilton municipal elections are officially non-partisan. Note: Candidate campaign colours are based on the prominent colour used in campaign items (signs, literature, etc.) and are used as a visual differentiation between candidates.
Sources: City of Hamilton, "Nominated Candidates"

=== Ward 11 - Glanbrook ===
Ward 11's incumbent councillor, Brenda Johnson, was first elected in 2010 and announced that she would not seek another term in office in 2022.

The first candidate to register for the race was Nick Lauwers, the runner-up in the 2014 HWDSB trustee election in Wards 14 and 15 (Wentworth-Flamborough) on 3 May 2022. Lauwers, who sought the Ontario Progressive Conservative Party's nomination to run in Ancaster-Dundas-Flamborough-Westdale in 2014 and Flamborough-Glanbrook in 2017, told media his priorities included capping development and improving the area's infrastructure.

Candidates for the 24 October 2022 Hamilton Ward 11 councillor election
Candidate	Popular vote			Expenditures
Candidate	Votes	%	±%	Expenditures
Mark Tadeson	2,829	37.99	-	
Nick Lauwers	2,746	36.88	-	
Nick Pellegrino	1,318	17.70	-	
Terri Moffett	553	7.43	-	
Total votes	7,446			
Registered voters				
Note: All Hamilton municipal elections are officially non-partisan. Note: Candidate campaign colours are based on the prominent colour used in campaign items (signs, literature, etc.) and are used as a visual differentiation between candidates.
Sources: City of Hamilton, "Nominated Candidates"

=== Ward 12 - Ancaster ===
Ward 12's incumbent councillor, Lloyd Ferguson, was first elected in 2006 and indicated to the Ancaster News in 2018 that he expects this to be his last term on council. Ferguson raised media speculation about his intentions when he spent time asking city staff about the 2023 council schedule on 31 March 2022, making statements such as "I like that extra long break at Christmas, so staff and ourselves can get away," implying he hoped to be at the council table again in the next term of office. Ferguson confirmed his intention to retire at a press conference on 21 July.

On 30 April, local environmentalist and employee of Maple Leaf Foods, Craig Cassar, announced his intention to seek the Ward 12 councillor's seat. Cassar became the first to register on 13 May. Active in the campaign to stop the city's urban boundary expansion, Cassar indicated that he would promote "the right kind of development" in Ancaster and advocate for policies like inclusionary zoning. Cassar was endorsed by the Hamilton and District Labour Council.

Bob Maton, a local heritage advocate, was the source of considerable speculation regarding his potential candidacy for months preceding the election. Maton, previously a candidate for HWDSB trustee (Wards 11 and 12 - Ancaster-Glanbrook) in 2006, candidate for HWDSB trustee (Ward 13 - Dundas) in 2014, and 2011 Family Coalition Party candidate for Ancaster-Dundas-Flamborough-Westdale, registered to run on 4 July.

Ancaster-based businessperson and president of the area's chapter of the Rotary Club, Karl Hanley, registered to run on 20 July.

Perennial candidate Pamela Mitchell registered to run on 10 August. Mitchell ran for Ward 13 (Dundas) councillor in 2014 and 2018, logging no campaign expenses each time.

Local volunteer and corporate executive, Robert Baboth, told the Ancaster News that he sought the Ward 12 seat at the urging of his wife. Baboth organizes a local charity golf tournament in honour of his late mother, who worked as a secretary at an area Catholic elementary school. Baboth indicated his priorities would be keeping an open dialogue on development issues, promoting community gardens, designing safe streets, and holding regular town halls with residents.

Candidates for the 24 October 2022 Hamilton Ward 12 councillor election
Candidate	Popular vote			Expenditures
Candidate	Votes	%	±%	Expenditures
Craig Cassar	4,960	38.80	-	
Chuck Alkerton	2,601	20.34	-	
Karl Hanley	1,499	11.72	-	
William Hume	1,063	8.31	-	
Bob Maton	774	6.05	-	
Megg Markettos	688	5.38	-	
Cindy Kaye	395	3.09	-	
Robert Baboth	385	3.01	-	
Richard Deverson	245	1.92	-	
Pamela Mitchell	175	1.37	-	
Total votes	12,785			
Registered voters				
Note: All Hamilton municipal elections are officially non-partisan. Note: Candidate campaign colours are based on the prominent colour used in campaign items (signs, literature, etc.) and are used as a visual differentiation between candidates.
Sources: City of Hamilton, "Nominated Candidates"

=== Ward 13 - Dundas ===
Ward 13's incumbent councillor, Arlene VanderBeek, was first elected in 2014. VanderBeek registered for re-election on 24 June.

Candidates for the 24 October 2022 Hamilton Ward 13 councillor election
Candidate	Popular vote			Expenditures
Candidate	Votes	%	±%	Expenditures
Alex Wilson	7,038	57.94		
Arlene VanderBeek (incumbent)	5,110	42.06	+7.57%	
Total votes	12,148			
Registered voters				
Note: All Hamilton municipal elections are officially non-partisan. Note: Candidate campaign colours are based on the prominent colour used in campaign items (signs, literature, etc.) and are used as a visual differentiation between candidates.
Sources: City of Hamilton, "Nominated Candidates"

=== Ward 14 - West Mountain ===
Ward 14's incumbent councillor, Terry Whitehead, was first elected in 2003 and had not announced any intentions for 2022. Offered an opportunity to declare his intentions by the Hamilton Mountain News in January 2022, Whitehead did not respond to the paper's inquiries. In May 2022, the Hamilton Spectator reported that Whitehead was waiting to be medically cleared to run for re-election. On 13 May, in an interview with Hamilton Spectator reporter Scott Radley, Whitehead announced that he would be seeking re-election, indicating that he had considered retirement, but that left-wing activists had prompted him to run again, saying that there were "barbarians are at the gates wanting it [Hamilton City Council] to go even further left." During the interview, Whitehead called for Councillors Maureen Wilson (Ward 1 - Chedoke Cootes) and Nrinder Nann (Ward 3 - Hamilton Centre) to be defeated, attacked Mayor Eisenberger, and said some city hall staff were "duds". Whitehead was absent from city hall after his second reprimand for harassing staff and councillors, and announced via press release on the day municipal nominations closed that he would not run again.

The first candidate to register was Kojo Damptey, a local musician and chair of the Hamilton Centre for Civic Inclusion. Damptey was endorsed by the Hamilton and District Labour Council. Brian Lewis, a community volunteer, registered on May 2, and was endorsed by CUPE Local 5167. Local Colleen Wicken, a previous staffer with incumbent councillor Terry Whitehead, registered to run on 30 June. Wicken sought the office of Ward 8 councillor in 2018 and placed fourth.

Candidates for the 24 October 2022 Hamilton Ward 14 councillor election
Candidate	Popular vote			Expenditures
Candidate	Votes	%	±%	Expenditures
Michael Spadafora	2,610	28.48	-	
Kojo Damptey	2,531	27.62	-	
Don Ross	1,382	15.08	-	
Brian Lewis	1,108	12.09	-	
Christine Seketa	766	8.36	-	
Colleen Wicken	620	6.77	-	
Christopher Poole	147	1.60	-	
Total votes	9,164			
Registered voters				
Note: All Hamilton municipal elections are officially non-partisan. Note: Candidate campaign colours are based on the prominent colour used in campaign items (signs, literature, etc.) and are used as a visual differentiation between candidates.
Sources: City of Hamilton, "Nominated Candidates"

=== Ward 15 - Flamborough ===
Ward 15's incumbent councillor, Judi Partridge, was first elected in 2010. In early 2022, she announced that she would not seek re-election.

Ted McMeekin, the former MPP for Ancaster—Dundas—Flamborough—Westdale, was the subject of considerable speculation over his political future in 2021 and 2022. Noted as a potential mayoral candidate or candidate for councillor in Ward 13, McMeekin finally announced that he would seek election in Ward 15 after being approached by a group of area residents who encouraged him to run for the open seat. McMeekin previously served as Ward 7 (Central/East Mountain) alderman from 1976 to 1980 and as mayor of Flamborough from 1994 until its amalgamation with Hamilton in 2000. McMeekin registered on 25 July.

Candidates for the 24 October 2022 Hamilton Ward 15 councillor election
Candidate	Popular vote			Expenditures
Candidate	Votes	%	±%	Expenditures
Ted McMeekin	3,091	43.83	-	
Zobia Jawed	2,451	34.76	-	
Chris Pera	833	11.81	-	
Robert Kunysz	353	5.01	-	
Sumaira Waqar	324	4.59	-	
Total votes	7,102			
Registered voters				
Note: All Hamilton municipal elections are officially non-partisan. Note: Candidate campaign colours are based on the prominent colour used in campaign items (signs, literature, etc.) and are used as a visual differentiation between candidates.
Sources: City of Hamilton, "Nominated Candidates"

=== Incumbents not running for re-election ===
Ward		Incumbent	Time in office and terms		Subsequent elected councillor	Reference	Notes
Ward 4	East Hamilton	Sam Merulla	2000 - 2022	6	Tammy Hwang		
Ward 5	Red Hill	Russ Powers	2021 - 2022	1	Matt Francis		Powers also served as Ward 13 (Dundas) councillor from 2000 to 2003 and from 2006 to 2014.
Ward 11	Glanbrook	Brenda Johnson	2010 - 2022	3	Mark Tadeson		
Ward 12	Ancaster	Lloyd Ferguson	2006 - 2022	4	Craig Cassar		
Ward 14	West Mountain	Terry Whitehead	2003 - 2022	5	Mike Spadafora		Whitehead was elected Ward 8 councillor in 2003 and moved to Ward 14 after ward boundary redistribution.
Ward 15	Flamborough	Judi Partridge	2010 - 2022	3	Ted McMeekin		

== Public school trustee elections ==
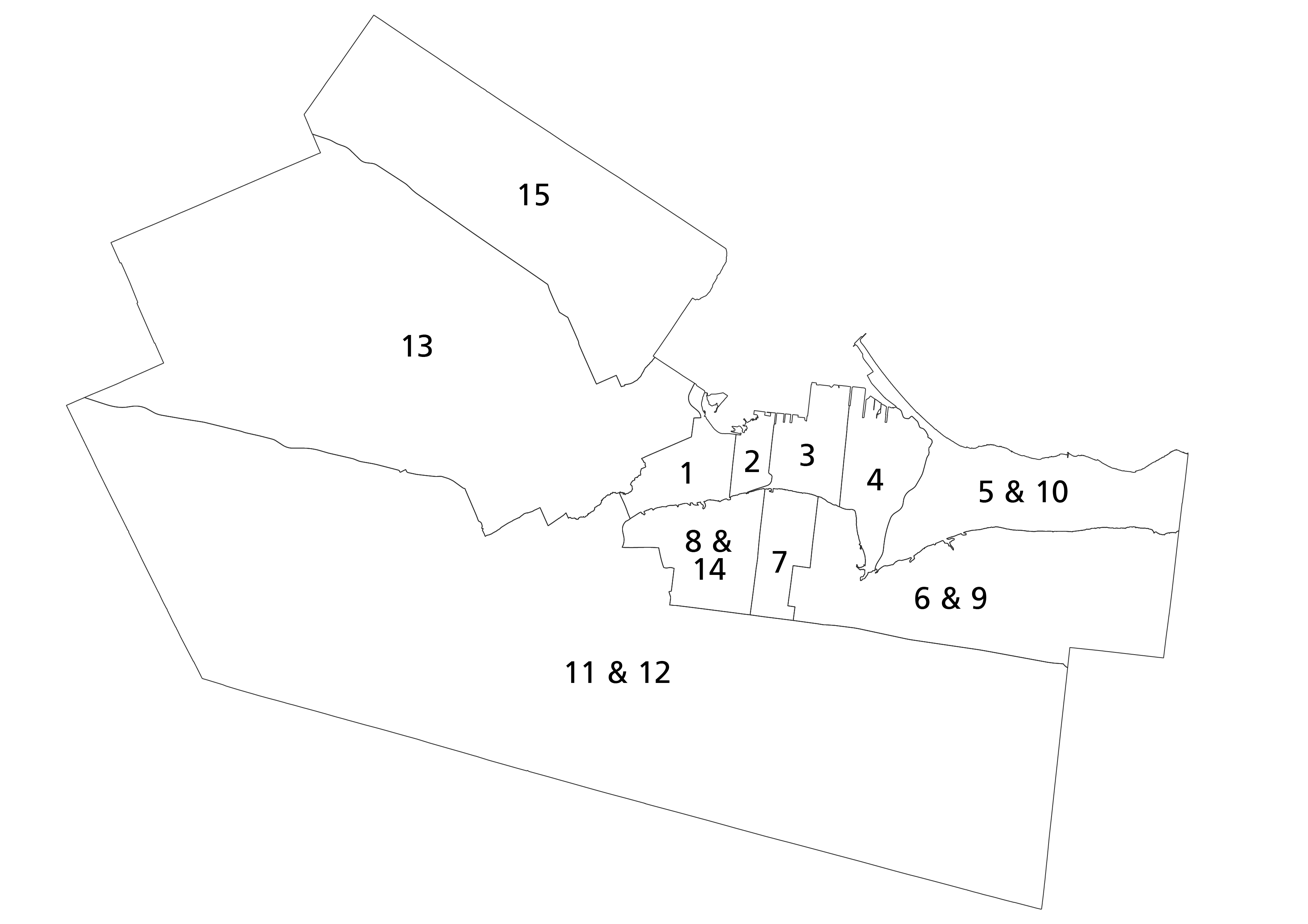
Municipal wards for the election of trustees to the Hamilton-Wentworth District School Board

=== Ward 1 - Chedoke Cootes ===
Ward 1 received its own public school trustee in the trustee ward re-allocation of 2022. This was the first time Ward 1 had had its own dedicated trustee since 1997.

Incumbent Wards 1 & 2 trustee Elizabeth Wong, who was appointed to the position after the resignation of Christine Bingham in 2021, registered on 7 July. Local media erroneously reported that Wong would not seek a full term in office when she, in reality, had not indicated any intention to not seek election in 2022. Cameron Prosic, who served as a former HWDSB student trustee, registered to run on 8 July. Wong, 22, and Prosic, 20, were two of the youngest candidates in the election.

Hamilton-Wentworth District School Board Ward 1 trustee election
Candidate
Candidate	Votes	%
Elizabeth Wong (incumbent)	4,864	69.4%
Michael Kelly	1,091	15.6%
Wendy Thrasher	586	8.4%
Cameron Prosic	467	6.7%

=== Ward 2 - Downtown ===
The first candidate to register for the new Ward 2 trustee seat was student activist Sabreina Dehab. A co-founder of Hamilton Students for Justice, Dehab had been instrumental in campaigning for the removal of Hamilton Police Service members from HWDSB schools. Andrew Smyth, a local father, McMaster MBA student, and business operations leader, registered to run on May 9.

Hamilton-Wentworth District School Board Ward 2 trustee election
Candidate
Candidate	Votes	%
Sabreina Dehab	3,289	57.02%
Michael Peters	1,207	20.93%
Andrew Smyth	829	14.37%
Tarek Jalbout	443	7.7%

=== Ward 3 - Hamilton Centre ===
Maria Felix Miller, Ward 3's incumbent trustee who was appointed following the sudden death of her predecessor Chris Parkinson, announced in May 2022 that she would seek re-election. Felix Miller registered to run on 20 June. Larry Pattison, the Ward 3 trustee from 2014 to 2018 and 2021 Green Party candidate for MP in Hamilton East—Stoney Creek, registered to run on the last day of nominations.

Hamilton-Wentworth District School Board Ward 3 trustee election
Candidate
Candidate	Votes	%
Maria Felix Miller (incumbent)	3,972	60.39%
Larry Pattison	1,685	25.62%
Fatima Baig	920	13.99%

=== Ward 4 - Hamilton East ===
Incumbent school trustee Ray Mulholland registered for re-election on 4 May 2022. Mulholland first ran for the office of trustee in 1968. He was appointed to the school board in 1972, but served only four months before losing re-election. He served briefly during the 1973–1976 term of office and had held the office of Ward 4 trustee non-stop since 1978.

Hamilton-Wentworth District School Board Ward 4 trustee election
Candidate
Candidate	Votes	%
Ray Mulholland (incumbent)	3,133	47.46%
Shane Cunningham Boles	2,363	35.80%
Davin Thornborrow	1,105	16.74%

=== Wards 5 and 10 - Red Hill and Lower Stoney Creek ===
After a controversy-filled term, incumbent Ward 5 trustee Carole Paikin Miller made no intentions known to local media. Registration closed without Paikin Miller filing to run.

Tony Lemma, a local political figure who placed 10th in the race for Ward 3 councillor in 2018, ran as an MPP candidate for the None of the Above Direct Democracy Party in Hamilton Centre in the 2018 Ontario provincial election, and ran as an independent candidate, also in Hamilton Centre, in the 2019 Canadian federal election, registered to run for HWDSB trustee in Wards 5 and 10 on 26 May. Lemma withdrew from the race on 4 July.

Local mother Nancy Silva Khan registered to seek the Wards 5 and 10 trustee seat on 15 June.

Former Ward 5 trustee and Chair of the Hamilton-Wentworth District School Board, Todd White, registered to run on 15 July. White lost a close race with incumbent Ward 5 trustee Carole Paikin Miller in 2018.

Hamilton-Wentworth District School Board Wards 5 and 10 trustee election
Candidate
Candidate	Votes	%
Todd White	4,032	34.30%
Marie Jackson	3,561	30.29%
Zahid Butt	1,731	14.73%
Joseph Szigeti	492	4.19%

=== Wards 6 and 9 - East Mountain and Upper Stoney Creek ===
The first candidate to register on 6 May was Jay Edington, a local labour activist who sought the Ward 6 trustee seat in 2018. Local parent Miranda Butler registered on 7 June. Butler was a vocal opponent of the HWDSB's decision to maintain mask mandates after the province directed they be dropped in schools. Butler was quoted in the National Post as calling the board's decision "an overreach". Butler withdrew on 26 July.

Incumbent Ward 6 trustee Kathy Archer, who had signaled an intention to seek re-election in May 2022, registered to run for a third consecutive/fourth non-consecutive term on 19 July.

Hamilton-Wentworth District School Board Wards 6 and 9 trustee election
Candidate
Candidate	Votes	%
Kathy Archer	6,123	56.98%
Jay Edington	4,623	43.02%

=== Ward 7 - Central Mountain ===
Hamilton-Wentworth District School Board Ward 7 trustee election
Candidate
Candidate	Votes	%
Dawn Danko (incumbent)	4,592	56.11%
Amy Cowling	2,479	30.29%
Ryan Weinberger	1,113	13.60%

=== Wards 8 and 14 - West Mountain ===
Former student trustee and whistleblower Ahona Mehdi registered to seek election in Wards 8 and 14 on 2 May. Mehdi was the student trustee whose Twitter thread accusing trustees of racist behaviour prompted an independent investigator's review. Incumbent trustee Becky Buck registered to run for re-election on 26 July.

Hamilton-Wentworth District School Board Wards 8 and 14 trustee election
Candidate
Candidate	Votes	%
Becky Buck (incumbent)	4,774	42.33%
Ahona Mehdi	3,502	31.05%
Ben O'Reilly	2,513	22.28%
Behrouz Bakhtiari	488	4.33%

=== Wards 11 and 12 - Ancaster-Glanbrook ===
Hamilton-Wentworth District School Board Wards 11 and 12 trustee election
Candidate
Candidate	Votes	%
Amanda Fehram	7,661	58.27%
Tom Patterson	5,486	41.73%

=== Ward 13 - Dundas ===
Incumbent trustee Paul Tut registered on 3 May to run for a second term. On 13 July, Larry Masters registered to run for trustee in Ward 13. Masters is affiliated with the anti-CRT group "StopWoke.ca".

Hamilton-Wentworth District School Board Ward 13 trustee election
Candidate
Candidate	Votes	%
Paul Tut (incumbent)	6,237	67.54%
Larry Masters	2,997	32.46%

=== Ward 15 - Flamborough ===
Incumbent trustee Penny Deathe announced that she would not seek a third term in May 2022. The first candidate to register for the seat was the founder of the right-wing, anti-CRT group "StopWoke.ca", Catherine Anne Kronas, who registered on 5 July.

On 4 August, Graeme Noble, who was previously registered to run in Ward 1, registered to run in Ward 15.

Hamilton-Wentworth District School Board Ward 15 trustee election
Candidate
Candidate	Votes	%
Graeme Noble	2,979	53.04%
Catherine Anne Kronas	2,303	41.00%
Syed Banoori	335	5.96%

=== Incumbents not running for re-election ===
Ward		Incumbent	Time in office and terms		Subsequent elected trustee		Reference	Notes
Ward 5	Red Hill	Carole Paikin Miller	2018 - 2022	1	Todd White	Wards 5 & 10		
Wards 9 and 10	Stoney Creek	Cam Galindo	2018 - 2022	1	Kathy Archer	Wards 6 & 9		
Wards 11 and 12	Ancaster-Glanbrook	Alex Johnstone	2010 - 2022	3	Amanda Fehrman			Johnstone ran unsuccessfully for councillor in Ward 4 (Hamilton East).
Ward 15	Flamborough	Penny Deathe	2014 - 2022	2	Graeme Noble			

== Catholic school trustee elections ==
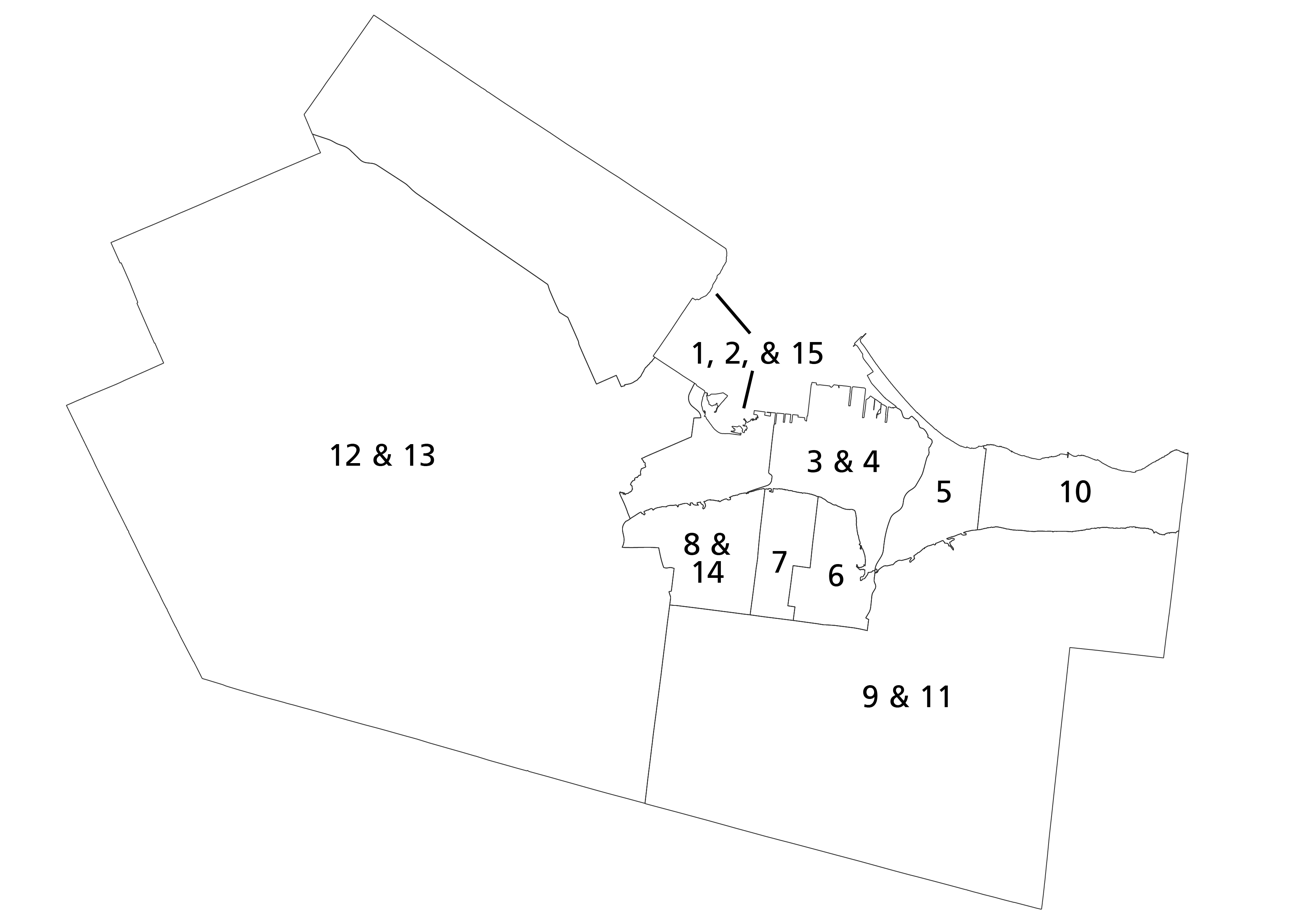
Municipal wards for the election of trustees to the Hamilton-Wentworth Catholic District School Board

=== Wards 1, 2, and 15 - West Hamilton-Flamborough ===
Hamilton-Wentworth Catholic District School Board Wards 1, 2, and 15 trustee election
Candidate
Candidate	Votes	%
Mark Valvasori (incumbent)	Acclaimed	

=== Wards 3 and 4 - Hamilton Centre/East ===
The first candidate to register was former trustee Ralph Agostino. Agostino, the brother of former MPP Dominic Agostino, served as Catholic trustee for Ward 3 from 1994 to 1997, and for the combined Wards 3 & 4 (Hamilton Centre/East) from 1997 to 2014, when he unsuccessfully sought the office of city councillor for Ward 3. Agostino ran unsuccessfully for Wards 3 & 4 trustee in 2018, and was the unsuccessful Ontario Liberal Party candidate in the 2004 provincial by-election in Hamilton East, made vacant by the death of his brother.

Hamilton-Wentworth Catholic District School Board Wards 3 and 4 trustee election
Candidate
Candidate	Votes	%
Josie Angelini	1,467	52.47%
Ralph Agostino	1,329	47.53%

=== Ward 5 - Red Hill ===
Hamilton-Wentworth Catholic District School Board Ward 5 trustee election
Candidate
Candidate	Votes	%
Aldo D'Intino (incumbent)	1,852	71.05%
Lucas Mascotto-Carbone	755	28.96%

=== Ward 6 - East Mountain ===
Hamilton-Wentworth Catholic District School Board Ward 6 trustee election
Candidate
Candidate	Votes	%
Ellen Agostino	1,503	54.77%
Peter Mamer	900	32.80%
Anthony Mari	341	12.43%

=== Ward 7 - Central Mountain ===
Incumbent trustee Patrick Daly filed to run in Ward 7 on 10 May. Daly had been acclaimed in every election since 1997. Two candidates, Michael Di Giacomo and Nick Agostino, registered to run on 19 August, marking the first time since 1994 that Daly had been opposed in an election.

Daly, the 64-year-old son of the former Ward 7 trustee, had become a fixture in the province's Catholic school system, serving as chair of the HWCDSB and as president of both the Canadian Catholic School Trustees' Association and Ontario Catholic School Trustees' Association. Daly grew up in the area, but lived in Ancaster at the time of the election. Michael Di Giacomo, a 27 year-old who worked in the financial services industry, registered to provide a choice to Catholic ratepayers on the central mountain, and to oppose excessive Catholic ideology from influencing hiring decisions at the board. The third candidate in the race, Nick Agostino, was a 25-year-old contractor who hailed from the city's politically involved Agostino family. Nick is the son of Wards 3 and 4 trustee candidate Ralph Agostino, brother-in-law of Ward 6 trustee candidate Ellen Agostino, and nephew of former Hamilton East MPP Dominic Agostino. Nick Agostino ran on a platform of providing a voice for parents in the wake of the COVID-19 pandemic and providing better mental health supports.

Hamilton-Wentworth Catholic District School Board Ward 7 trustee election
Candidate
Candidate	Votes	%
Patrick Daly (incumbent)	1,491	50.80%
Nick Agostino	1,152	39.25%
Michael Di Giacomo	292	9.95%

=== Wards 8 and 14 - West Mountain ===
Hamilton-Wentworth Catholic District School Board Wards 8 and 14 trustee election
Candidate
Candidate	Votes	%
John Valvasori (incumbent)	3,436	64.32%
Francesco Capisciolto	1,381	25.85%
Wieslawa Chrapka	525	9.83%

=== Wards 9 and 11 - Upper Stoney Creek-Glanbrook ===
Hamilton-Wentworth Catholic District School Board Wards 9 and 11 trustee election
Candidate
Candidate	Votes	%
Louis Agro (incumbent)	1,706	42.92%
Tyler Iorio (Note 1)	1,175	29.56%
Jeanie Corner	1,094	27.52%

=== Ward 10 - Lower Stoney Creek ===
On 2 May, incumbent trustee Mary Nardini registered for re-election.

Hamilton-Wentworth Catholic District School Board Ward 10 trustee election
Candidate
Candidate	Votes	%
Mary Nardini (incumbent)	2,345	54.93%
Andrea Di Nicola	1,924	45.07%

=== Wards 12 and 13 - Ancaster-Dundas ===
Incumbent trustee Phil Homerski registered to run for re-election on 2 June.

Perennial candidate Ricky Tavares registered to run on 18 August. Tavares gained notoriety in his campaigns for demanding payment or the purchase of marijuana seeds to interact with local media, his inappropriate comments toward a CBC reporter in 2018, and for his commitment to serve one term as mayor before "moving to Ottawa to be your Prime Minister of Canada".

Hamilton-Wentworth Catholic District School Board Wards 12 and 13 trustee election
Candidate
Candidate	Votes	%
Phil Homerski (incumbent)	2,505	57.91%
Ricky Tavares	1,821	42.09%

== French-language school trustee elections ==
=== Conseil Scolaire Viamonde ===
Conseil Scolaire Viamonde trustee election
Candidate
Candidate	Votes	%
Pierre Girouard	Acclaimed	

=== Conseil Scolaire Catholique MonAvenir ===
Conseil scolaire catholique MonAvenir trustee election
Candidate
Candidate	Votes	%
Marcel Levesque (incumbent)	543	70.52%
Joseph Gosselin	227	29.48%

== Mid-term elections ==
Less than a year after the 2018 elections, HWDSB trustee Chris Parkinson (Ward 3 - Hamilton Centre) died suddenly of a heart attack at age 53. Parkinson, a microbiologist by training, was a prolific volunteer and well-known community figure in central Hamilton. In June, 2019, the HWDSB appointed the runner-up from the 2018 election, Maria Felix Miller, to the seat. The race between Parkinson and Miller was extremely close, with only 29 votes separating the two front-runners to replace outgoing trustee Larry Pattison.

On 11 September 2020, HWCDSB trustee Tony Perri (Wards 3 and 4 - Hamilton Centre/East) died. The 72-year-old trustee had been a figure in the city's restaurant and music scene, and had served as a trustee since 2014. Tyler Iorio, the runner-up in the 2018 Wards 9 and 10 Catholic trustee race and the grandson of Patrick Wilson, a 20-year trustee on the HWCDSB, was appointed to the board at a virtual meeting held on November 20, 2020.

Ward 5 (Red Hill) Councillor Chad Collins successfully stood as a Liberal Party candidate for parliament in Hamilton East—Stoney Creek in the 2021 Canadian federal election. Council opted to hold an appointment to fill Collins' vacant seat, meeting on 12 November 2021 to decide on a replacement. From among 20 applicants, two received votes: former MP and Ward 13 - Dundas Councillor Russ Powers and former Mayor Larry Di Ianni. In an 8 to 6 vote, Powers was elected to fill the seat for the remainder of the term.

Wards 1 & 2 (West Lower City) public trustee Christine Bingham resigned from the HWDSB for undisclosed personal reasons on 28 November 2021. The HWDSB board of trustees issued a public call for applicants for the vacant seat, requesting that anyone applying declare they would not seek election to a full term in the October election. Applicants included 2014 trustee candidate and 1994–1997 Ward 1 trustee Brian Gage and 2014–2018 Ward 3 trustee Larry Pattison. The winner was former student trustee Elizabeth Wong.

== Timeline ==
2018

- 22 October: 2018 municipal election

2019

- 16 January: The first report detailing the sewage leak into Chedoke Creek is released to councillors.
- 30 May: Ward 3 (Hamilton Centre) HWDSB trustee Chris Parkinson dies suddenly.
- 15 June: Protesters attacked by anarchists at Hamilton's annual Pride celebrations.
- 17 June: Maria Felix Miller is appointed Ward 3 (Hamilton Centre) HWDSB trustee.
- 17 December: The provincial government announces it will no longer support Hamilton's LRT project.

2020

- 23 March: Ontario enters lockdown to slow the spread of COVID-19.
- 19 June: Hamilton enters "Stage 2" of Ontario's economic reopening.
- 24 July: Hamilton enters "Stage 3" of Ontario's economic reopening.
- 1 August: Ahona Mehdi, a former student trustee with the Hamilton-Wentworth District School Board, publishes a Twitter thread accusing some sitting trustees of racist and discriminatory behaviour.
- 11 September: Wards 3 and 4 (Hamilton Centre/East) HWCDSB trustee Tony Perri dies.
- 16 November: Hamilton enters the Red Zone (Control) of Ontario's COVID-19 Regional Advisory System after a steady increase in the number of cases.
- 20 November: Tyler Iorio is appointed Wards 3 and 4 (Hamilton Centre/East) HWCDSB trustee.
- 23 November: Protesters with DefundHPS (Defund the Hamilton Police Service) begin an encampment on the steps of city hall to call for the police budget to be diverted to free housing.
- 30 November: In response to the Hamilton Police Service dismantling the DefundHPS encampment, protesters leave a coffin filled with roses, plants, and naloxone kits on the doorstep of Mayor Fred Eisenberger's east Hamilton home.
- 7 December: DefundHPS ends the encampment at city hall after failing to secure a public meeting with Mayor Fred Eisenberger.
- 21 December: Hamilton enters the Grey Zone (lockdown) of Ontario's COVID-19 Regional Advisory System after failing to decrease the number of cases since entering the Red Zone in November.

2021

- 3 February: The HWDSB releases a report on the allegations of a former student trustee into racism and discrimination among trustees.
- 4 February: Hamilton Students for Justice name the trustees in the HWDSB report - Carole Paikin-Miller (Ward 5 - Red Hill), Kathy Archer (Ward 6 - East Mountain), Alex Johnstone (Wards 11 and 12 - Ancaster-Glanbrook), and Becky Buck (Wards 8 and 14 - West Mountain) - and call for their "impeachment".
- 4 March: The trustees of the HWDSB formally sanction Alex Johnstone (Wards 11 and 12 - Ancaster-Glanbrook) and Carole Paikin-Miller (Ward 5 - Red Hill), as well as requesting Paikin-Miller resign from the board.
- 10 November: Council votes to dock Terry Whitehead (Ward 14 - West Mountain) 30 days' pay over his harassment of staff member Edward Soldo, the city's transportation operations director.
- 12 November: Council appoints former Ward 13 - Dundas councillor Russ Powers to fill the Ward 5 - Red Hill seat, vacated after Chad Collins was elected as a Liberal MP in the House of Commons of Canada to serve the riding of Hamilton East—Stoney Creek. Powers earned 8 votes while former mayor Larry Di Ianni earned 6.
- 28 November: Wards 1 & 2 (West Lower City) HWDSB Trustee Christine Bingham resigns for undisclosed personal reasons.

2022

- 19 January: Hamilton Chamber of Commerce CEO Keenan Loomis announces he will run for mayor.
- 22 February: Former student trustee Elizabeth Wong is selected by HWDSB trustees to fill the Wards 1 & 2 vacancy.
- 28 March: Former mayor Bob Bratina announces he will run again in 2022.
- 28 March: Trustees of the HWDSB announce new ward boundary pairings for the 2022 election.
- 2 May: Nominations open.
- 19 August: Nominations close.
- 21 October: Deadline for third-party advertisers to register.
- 24 October: Election day.
