= Jeff Beattie =

Canadian politician

Jeff Beattie MPP

Member of the Ontario Provincial Parliament for Hamilton East—Stoney Creek
- Incumbent
- Assumed office September 3, 2026
- Preceded by: Neil Lumsden

Hamilton City Councillor
- In office 2022–2026
- Preceded by: Maria Pearson

Personal details
- Party: Progressive Conservative

Jeff Beattie is a Canadian politician who was elected as a member of Provincial Parliament (MPP) in a 2026 Hamilton East—Stoney Creek provincial by-election. He is a member of the Progressive Conservative Party of Ontario.

== Biography ==
Beattie is a Winona resident and local business owner.

Beattie was previously a councillor in Hamilton, elected to represent Ward 10 Lower Stoney Creek in 2022. He is the former vice-chair of the Hamilton-Wentworth District School Board and a HWDSB School Board Trustee for Wards 9 & 10, Stoney Creek, serving from 2014 to 2018. He previously sought the council seat in 2018. He initially sought re-election in 2026, but retired in July to become the PC candidate in Hamilton East—Stoney Creek.

== Electoral history ==
Ontario provincial by-election, September 3, 2026: Hamilton East—Stoney Creek
Party	Candidate	Votes	%	±%
Progressive Conservative	Jeff Beattie	10,500	38.87	–3.20
New Democratic	Monique Taylor	8,886	32.90	+15.30
Liberal	Heino Doessing	6,334	23.45	–8.16
Green	Pascale Marchand	719	2.66	–2.59
New Blue	Wieslawa Derlatka	318	1.18	–0.18
Ontario Party	Heather Curnew	254	0.94	–0.59
Total valid votes		27,011	99.47	+0.16
Total rejected, unmarked, and declined ballots		144	0.53	-0.16
Turnout		27,155	29.40	-14.42
Eligible voters		92,355		
Progressive Conservative hold		Swing		-9.25
Source: Elections Ontario

Candidates for the 24 October 2022 Hamilton Ward 10 councillor election
Candidate	Popular vote			Expenditures
Candidate	Votes	%	±%	Expenditures
Jeff Beattie	4,236	39.69	+15.16%	
Louie Milojevic	3,436	32.20	+4.95%	
Maria Pearson (incumbent)	3,000	28.11	-8.23%	
Total votes	10,672			
Registered voters				
Note: All Hamilton municipal elections are officially non-partisan. Note: Candidate campaign colours are based on the prominent colour used in campaign items (signs, literature, etc.) and are used as a visual differentiation between candidates.
Sources: City of Hamilton, "Nominated Candidates"

Candidates for the October 22, 2018 Hamilton, Ontario Ward 10 councillor election
Candidate	Popular vote			Expenditures
Candidate	Votes	%	±%	Expenditures
Maria Pearson (incumbent)	3,988	36.34%	-21.69%	$23,895.59
Louie Milojevic	2,990	27.25%	-	$19,148.68
Jeff Beattie	2,692	24.53%	-	$13,957.90
Ian Thompson	1,304	11.88%	-	$12,294.42
Total votes	11,045			
Registered voters	27,005	40.88%	+0.02%	
^{1} These candidates did not submit official financial statements and were, therefore, ineligible to run in the 2022 municipal election. Note: All Hamilton municipal elections are officially non-partisan. Note: Candidate campaign colours are based on the prominent colour used in campaign items (signs, literature, etc.) and are used as a visual differentiation between candidates.
Sources: City of Hamilton, "Nominated Candidates"
