= Paul Miller (Canadian politician) =

Canadian politician

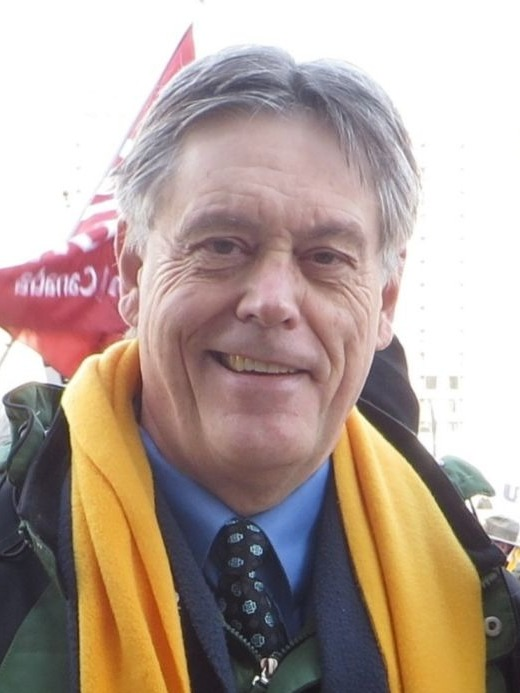
- Paul Miller, Member of the Ontario Provincial Legislature, Hamilton East - Stoney Creek, 2018.

Critic, Tourism and Sport
- In office August 23, 2018 – March 17, 2022
- Leader: Andrea Horwath

Member of the Ontario Provincial Parliament for Hamilton East—Stoney Creek
- In office October 10, 2007 – May 4, 2022
- Preceded by: Riding Established
- Succeeded by: Neil Lumsden

Personal details
- Born: February 7, 1951 (age 75) Hamilton, Ontario
- Party: Independent (2022-present)
- Other political affiliations: New Democratic (2007-2022)
- Spouse: Carole Paikin Miller
- Children: 3
- Occupation: Mechanic, Lobbyist, Local politician
- Website: www.paulmiller.ca

Paul David Miller (born February 7, 1951) is a politician in Ontario, Canada. He was a member of the Legislative Assembly of Ontario from 2007 provincial election until his defeat in the 2022 Ontario general election.

He represented the riding of Hamilton East—Stoney Creek as an Ontario New Democratic Party MPP until March 17, 2022 when he was expelled from the party's caucus and barred from running again for the NDP. He sat the remainder of his term as an independent MPP and ran unsuccessfully as an independent in the June 2, 2022 election.

== Background ==
Born in Hamilton, Miller's family moved to Stoney Creek when he was one year old. As a youth, he worked on the election campaigns of his uncle, former councillor and Hamilton Mayor, Bill Powell.

Miller worked for Hamilton Steel Hilton Works (formerly Stelco, now U.S. Steel Canada) as a mechanic-welder-fitter. While at Stelco he was a member of the United Steelworkers (USW), Local 1005. On behalf of the union, Miller served as a lobbyist on Parliament Hill and at Queen's Park, participating in 9 different campaigns.

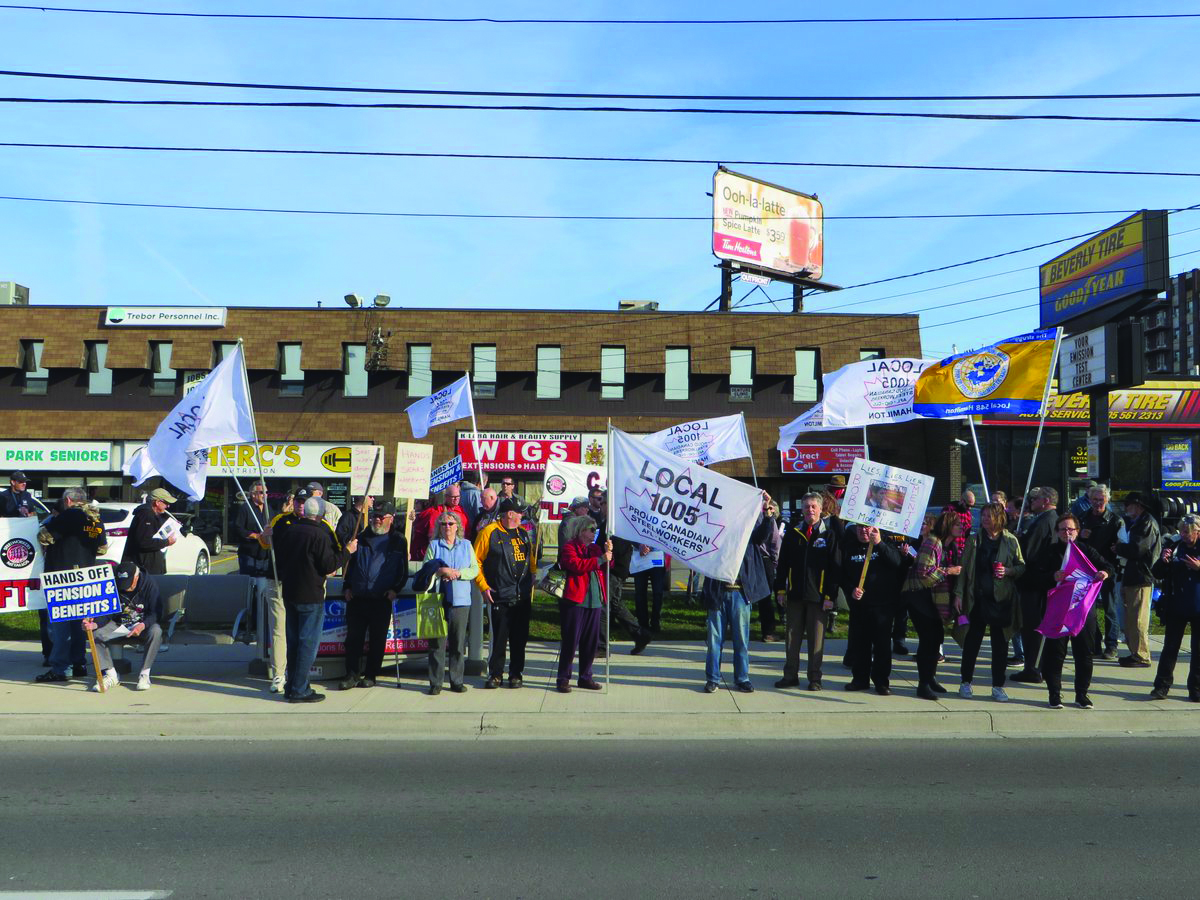
MPP Paul Miller and members of the Hamilton Local 1005 chapter of USW protesting for Sears Pensioners.

Miller is the husband of Hamilton school trustee Carole Paikin Miller. Miller is related to broadcaster Steve Paikin, a cousin to his wife.

== Politics ==
=== Early political career ===
Miller served as a city councillor for two terms in Stoney Creek, Ontario from 1994 to 2000. During his time on council he chaired the Parks and Recreation committee and served as a member on several other committees. Miller contested the newly-created Ward 9 councillor's seat after the amalgamation of the City of Hamilton in 2000, but lost to the last mayor of Stoney Creek, Anne Bain. Following his loss, he remained active in politics, working for 2004 New Democratic Party federal candidate Tony DePaulo, and for 2006 NDP federal candidate and former Member of Parliament Wayne Marston.

=== First terms at Queen's Park ===
On July 12, 2007, he was nominated to run in Hamilton East—Stoney Creek in the 2007 Ontario general election. Miller campaigned on a platform of job retention and a promise to push for an increase in the minimum wage. He defeated Hamilton city councillor Sam Merulla for the NDP nomination. Miller defeated Liberal candidate Nerene Virgin.

In April 2008, Miller introduced a private member's bill that proposed to create a severance fund for workers who were owed money when their companies closed. The fund would be used to cover severances, vacation pay and other items owed to workers. Miller said, "It would allow people ... to have a little bit of a nest egg to hold them over until they get retrained or find another job." The proposed fund which would have been financed by existing companies was criticized by Labour Minister Brad Duguid, who said the fund was "nothing short of a payroll tax" and that it was "irresponsible in this economy to jack up taxes on businesses, in particular in the manufacturing sector." The proposed bill was shelved by a government committee.

In 2010, Miller introduced another private member's bill called the Eramosa Karst Feeder Lands Protection Act, 2010 that would protect land near the Eramosa Karst formation. Though he was a member of the NDP, Miller introduced the bill jointly with Niagara West-Glanbrook MPP (and Ontario PC Party leader) Tim Hudak. The bill proposed to permanently protect land occupied by streams that feed into the karst formation. The land owned by the Ontario Realty Corporation was designated for possible residential development. Miller called the lands a "geological wonder". He said, "These lands are the lifeline for the Eramosa Karst... we must move now to preserve the Eramosa Karst feeder lands." The bill was passed into law in the spring of 2011.

In 2013, Miller was at the centre of a controversy within Queen's Park when Ontario NDP Leader Andrea Horwath sent Paul Miller to the back bench after a dispute between the two politicians.

Miller was re-elected in the 2011, and 2014 provincial elections.

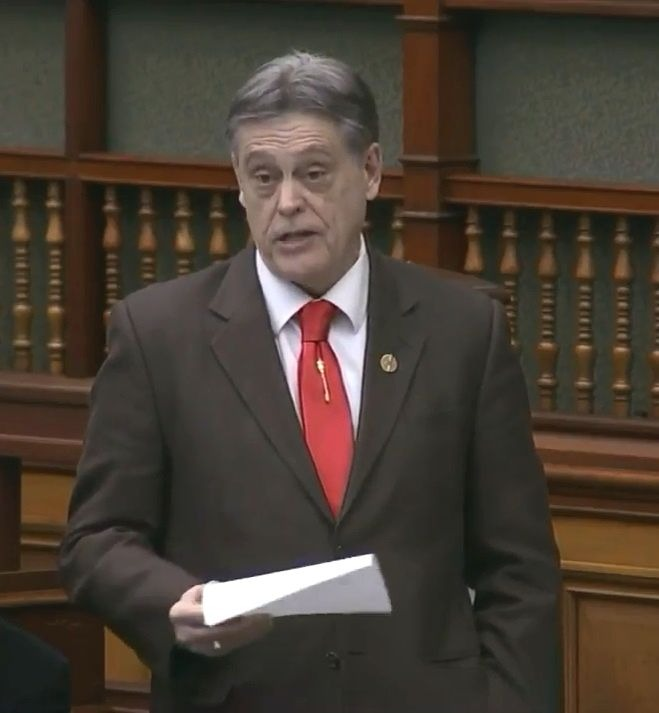
MPP Paul Miller speaking in the Ontario Legislature, 2017.

Miller served as the party's critic for Tourism, Culture and Sport and for the 2015 Pan and Parapan American Games.

In 2016, Miller advanced a bill that would look at the costs of living in various economic regions in Ontario, provide education around social assistance rates, and examine unsafe working conditions in the province. While the bill's progress was terminated upon the prorogation of the Ontario legislature in September 2016, Miller immediately re-introduced the bill upon the legislature's return.

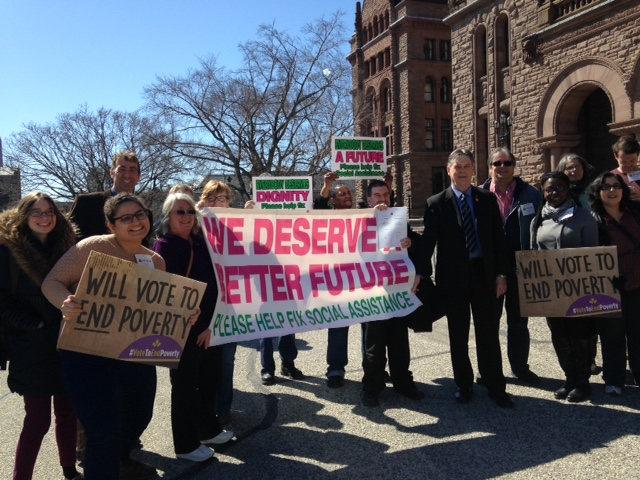
MPP Paul Miller alongside poverty reduction advocates from Hamilton.

=== Growing controversies ===
In 2018, questions were raised about Miller's future in Ontario provincial politics after a series of allegations of bullying, racist remarks, and abuse of office resources. The same year, a voice recording was released that showed Miller criticizing unions for doing more harm than good after it was reported that he had criticized the loyalty of an employee who took parental leave.

A Human Rights complaint was filed against Miller in April 2018. A statement to the Human Rights Tribunal of Ontario claimed Miller regularly displayed sexist, racist and homophobic behaviour.

In Ontario's 2018 election, Miller was able to claim his 4th victory in his Hamilton East-Stoney Creek Riding with more than 51 percent of the overall vote.

=== Expulsion from the NDP ===
On March 17, 2022 the party announced he would be disallowed from running under the NDP banner in the 2022 Ontario general election and was removed from the party's caucus because he was member of an Islamophobic Facebook group.

Miller rejected the claims against him and filed a legal suit against the Ontario NDP. The $1.3-million breach of contract claim against the NDP, Leader Andrea Horwath and two party officials, filed in a Hamilton court, alleges the Ontario NDP, Horwath and officials Lucy Watson and Michael Balagus, conspired to remove Miller from the caucus by knowingly using a false allegation.

Miller subsequently announced his intention to run as an independent in the province's 2022 election. He placed fourth, earning 6.7% of the vote and losing to Progressive Conservative challenger Neil Lumsden.

== Bills Sponsored in Ontario Legislature ==
=== Receiving Royal Assent ===
| Year | Act | Description |
|---|---|---|
| 2012 | Ontario Underground Infrastructure Notification System Act, 2012, S.O. 2012, c. 4 | Introduced as Bill 8, a bi-partisan measure putting safety first, promoted by Miller and Bob Bailey, (PC- Sarnia—Lambton). |
| 2013 | Lincoln Alexander Day Act, 2013, S.O. 2013, c. 18 | Introduced as Bill 125, it establishes January 21 of each year a day to celebrate Hamiltonian Lincoln Alexander. It was sponsored by Miller, Ted Arnott (PC - Wellington—Halton Hills) and Bas Balkissoon (Lib - Scarborough—Rouge River). |
| 2015 | Protecting Child Performers Act, 2015, S.O. 2015, c. 2 | Introduced as Bill 17, it creates the first legislated protections for child performers in Ontario's live and recorded entertainment industry. Child performers are the only form of child workers that the Government of Ontario recognizes. "This historic legislation contains provisions to protect a portion of minors' income, ensure their education is not compromised, guarantees parental supervision, age-appropriate hours of work and breaks, and health and safety measures." |

== Critic Roles ==
| Timeframe | Portfolio |
|---|---|
| December 2, 2016 — March 17, 2022 | Poverty Reduction |
| December 2, 2016 — March 17, 2022 | Pensions |
| September 10, 2013 — December 2, 2016 | Tourism, Culture and Sport |
| June 24, 2014 — January 1, 2016 | 2015 Pan and Parapan American Games |
| October 25, 2011 — September 10, 2013 | Government Services |
| October 25, 2011 — September 10, 2013 | Tourism and Culture |
| April 1, 2009 — September 7, 2011 | Seniors' Issues |
| April 1, 2009 — September 7, 2011 | Government Services |
| November 9, 2007 — September 7, 2011 | Pensions |
| November 9, 2007 — September 7, 2011 | Workplace Safety and Insurance Board of Ontario |
| November 9, 2007 — September 7, 2011 | Tourism, Recreation and Sport |
| November 9, 2007 — April 1, 2009 | Economic Development and Trade |

== Electoral record ==
2022 Ontario general election: Hamilton East—Stoney Creek
| Party | Candidate | Votes | % | ±% | Expenditures |
|---|---|---|---|---|---|
| Progressive Conservative | Neil Lumsden | 12,166 | 34.60 | +5.78 | $47,580 |
| New Democratic | Zaigham Butt | 9,614 | 27.34 | –23.82 | $82,230 |
| Liberal | Jason Farr | 7,411 | 21.07 | +8.99 | $73,616 |
| Independent | Paul Miller | 2,411 | 6.86 | –44.30 | $8,083 |
| Green | Cassie Wylie | 1,740 | 4.95 | +0.67 | $381 |
| Ontario Party | Domenic Diluca | 1,052 | 2.99 | – | $4,627 |
| New Blue | Jeffery Raulino | 693 | 1.97 | – | $11,785 |
| Electoral Reform | Cameron Rajewski | 79 | 0.22 | – | $0 |
| Total valid votes/expense limit | | 35,166 | 98.74 | – | $121,750 |
| Total rejected, unmarked and declined ballots | | 449 | 1.26 | –0.08 | |
| Turnout | | 35,615 | 40.95 | –12.11 | |
| Eligible voters | | 86,964 | | | |
| Progressive Conservative gain from New Democratic | | Swing | | +14.80 | |
Source: Elections Ontario

2018 Ontario general election
| Party | Candidate | Votes | % | ±% |
|---|---|---|---|---|
| New Democratic | Paul Miller | 22,518 | 51.15 | +4.34 |
| Progressive Conservative | Akash Grewal | 12,684 | 28.81 | +11.06 |
| Liberal | Jennifer Stebbing | 5,320 | 12.09 | −17.07 |
| Green | Brian Munroe | 1,884 | 4.28 | +0.19 |
| Libertarian | Allan DeRoo | 715 | 1.62 | +0.03 |
| None of the Above | Linda Chenoweth | 659 | 1.50 | |
| New People's Choice | Lucina Monroy | 240 | 0.55 | |
| Total valid votes | | 44,020 | 100.0 | |
Source: Elections Ontario

2014 Ontario general election
| Party | Candidate | Votes | % | ±% |
|---|---|---|---|---|
| New Democratic | Paul Miller | 19,958 | 46.81 | -4.91 |
| Liberal | Ivan Luksic | 12,433 | 29.16 | +2.86 |
| Progressive Conservative | David Brown | 7,574 | 17.76 | -0.95 |
| Green | Greg Zink | 1,742 | 4.09 | +2.34 |
| Libertarian | Mark Burnison | 676 | 1.59 | +0.84 |
| Freedom | Britney Anne Johnston | 254 | 0.60 | +0.26 |
| Total valid votes | | 42,637 | 100.0 | |
| New Democratic hold | | Swing | | -3.88 |
Source: Elections Ontario

2011 Ontario general election
| Party | Candidate | Votes | % | ±% |
|---|---|---|---|---|
| New Democratic | Paul Miller | 20,361 | 51.6 | +14.0 |
| Liberal | Mark Cripps | 10,367 | 26.3 | -8.8 |
| Progressive Conservative | Nancy Fiorintino | 7,429 | 18.8 | -2.5 |
| Green | W. Peter Randall | 689 | 1.7 | -3.2 |
| Libertarian | Greg Pattinson | 305 | 0.8 | |
| Family Coalition | Bob Green Innes | 173 | 0.4 | -0.6 |
| Freedom | Philip Doucette | 133 | 0.3 | |
| Total valid votes | | 39,457 | 100.0 | |

2007 Ontario general election
| Party | Candidate | Votes | % | ±% |
|---|---|---|---|---|
| New Democratic | Paul Miller | 16,256 | 37.6 | |
| Liberal | Nerene Virgin | 15,171 | 35.1 | |
| Progressive Conservative | Tara Crugnale | 9,195 | 21.3 | |
| Green | Raymond Dartsch | 2,122 | 4.9 | |
| Family Coalition | Robert Innes | 451 | 1.0 | |
| Total valid votes | | 43,195 | 100.0 | |

Candidates for the November 13, 2000 Hamilton, Ontario Ward 9 Councillor Election
| Candidate | Popular vote | | |
| Candidate | Votes | % | ±% |
|---|---|---|---|
| Anne Bain | 2,703 | 35.87% | |
| Paul Miller | 2,631 | 35.78% | - |
| Bob Charters | 2,201 | 29.21% | - |
| Total votes | 7,535 | 100% | |
| Registered voters | 17,306 | 43.54% | |
Note: All Hamilton Municipal Elections are officially non-partisan. Note: Candidate campaign colours are based on the prominent colour used in campaign items (signs, literature, etc.) and are used as a visual differentiation between candidates.
