= Neil Lumsden =

Canadian football player and politician (born 1952)

The Honourable Neil Lumsden ECO
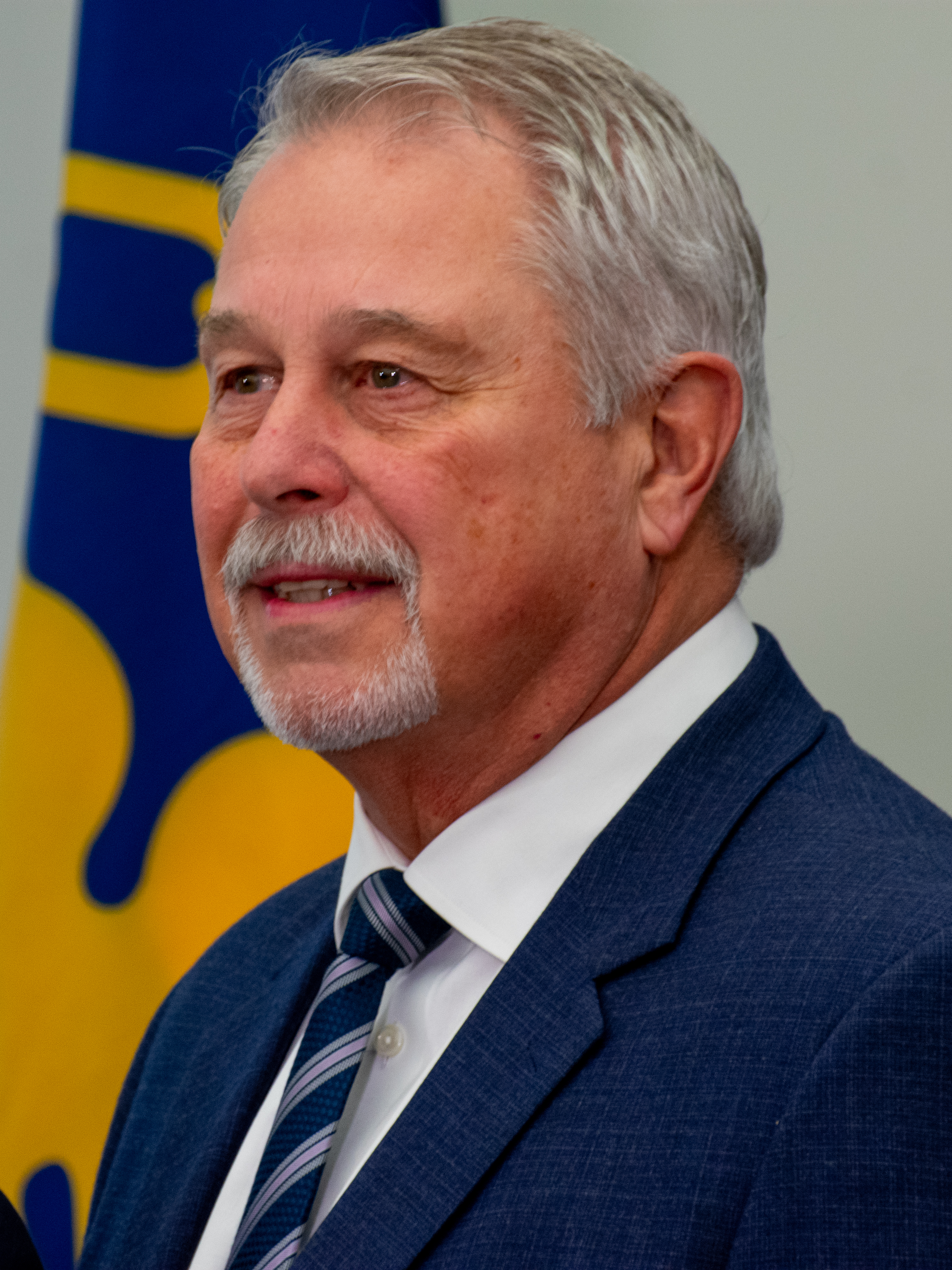
- Lumsden in 2024

Minister of Sport
- In office June 24, 2022 – August 4, 2026
- Premier: Doug Ford
- Preceded by: Lisa MacLeod
- Succeeded by: Brian Saunderson

Member of the Ontario Provincial Parliament for Hamilton East—Stoney Creek
- In office June 2, 2022 – August 4, 2026
- Preceded by: Paul Miller
- Succeeded by: Jeff Beattie

Personal details
- Born: Neil James Lumsden; December 19, 1952 (age 73) London, Ontario, Canada
- Party: Progressive Conservative
- Education: Crescent School (Toronto)
- Football career

No. 32
- Positions: Fullback, Running back

Career information
- University: Ottawa Gee-Gees
- CFL draft: 1976

Career history

Playing
- 1976–1978: Toronto Argonauts
- 1978–1979: Hamilton Tiger-Cats
- 1980–1985: Edmonton Eskimos

Operations
- 1996–1999: Hamilton Tiger-Cats

Awards and highlights
- As player: 3× Grey Cup champion (1980, 1981, 1982); Dick Suderman Trophy (1981); Frank M. Gibson Trophy (1976); As GM: Grey Cup champion (1999); 410 points CIS career, record; 148 points in a CIS season (1975)
- Canadian Football Hall of Fame (Class of 2014)

Neil James Lumsden ECO (born December 19, 1952) is a former Canadian politician and retired professional football player. Lumsden was elected to the Legislative Assembly of Ontario in the 2022 provincial election and served until 2026, and also served as Minister of Sport in the cabinet of Doug Ford.

Lumsden played his entire professional career in the Canadian Football League (CFL), mostly as a fullback and also as a running back for the Toronto Argonauts, Hamilton Tiger-Cats and Edmonton Eskimos from 1976 to 1985.

== Early life ==
Lumsden played high school football at Northern Secondary School and graduated from Crescent School in Toronto.

== Football career ==
Some of his career highlights include the Vanier Cup with the University of Ottawa Gee-Gees in 1975, being the eastern conference nominee for Most Outstanding Rookie in 1976, losing out to John Sciarra of the BC Lions, and winning three Grey Cup Championships with Edmonton Eskimos from 1980 to 1982, and again being a Grey Cup winner in 1999 as General Manager of the Hamilton Tiger-Cats. In the 1981 Grey Cup game Lumsden, with 8 receptions for 91 yards plus a carry for 2 yards, was selected as the Outstanding Canadian and was awarded the Dick Suderman Trophy.

In ten seasons, Lumsden played in 141 regular season games and carried the ball 767 times for 3,755 yards and 36 touchdowns. He also had 180 receptions for 1,729 yards and 15 more touchdowns. He was called several times during his career to fill in as a placekicker and punter.

== Post-CFL career ==
Lumsden worked briefly in cycling when he was appointed COO of the Hamilton, Ontario, UCI Road World Championships in 2003. This was only the fourth time the road cycling world championships had taken place outside Europe.

Lumsden now heads Drive Marketing, a sports marketing firm and a division of OK&D Marketing Group of Burlington, Ontario.

Lumsden acted as Honorary Chairman of the 2008 Desjardins Vanier Cup in Hamilton, Ontario.

In 2014, Lumsden was inducted into the Canadian Football Hall of Fame.

== Political career ==
In 2022, he was nominated to run as a candidate for the Progressive Conservative Party of Ontario in the provincial electoral riding of Hamilton East—Stoney Creek. He was then elected to the Legislative Assembly of Ontario in the 2022 provincial election. He was appointed Minister of Tourism, Culture and Sport in June 2022. In June 2024, he became Minister of Sport. On July 17, 2026, Neil Lumsden announced that he would retire effective August 4, 2026.

== Personal life ==
His son Jesse Lumsden was also a CFL football player who played for the Hamilton Tiger-Cats, Edmonton Eskimos, and Calgary Stampeders before retiring in 2011. He is now a member of the Canadian Olympic Bobsled Team.

In 2015, he and his daughter, Kristin Lumsden, a makeup artist/skincare specialist living and working in Toronto, competed in the third season of The Amazing Race Canada. In the first six legs, they placed 10th, 6th, 1st, 6th, 7th, and 6th. In the seventh leg, they placed last in 7th place and were eliminated from the show.

=== Electoral history ===
2025 Ontario general election
Party	Candidate	Votes	%	±%	Expenditures
Progressive Conservative	Neil Lumsden	16,401	42.07	+7.47	$64,086
Liberal	Heino Doessing	12,323	31.61	+10.54	$22,653
New Democratic	Zaigham Butt	6,862	17.60	–9.74	$60,575
Green	Pascale Marchand	2,049	5.26	+0.31	$8,890
Ontario Party	Heather Curnew	595	1.53	–1.46	$0
New Blue	Wieslawa Derlatka	530	1.36	–0.61	$625
Communist	Drew Garvie	223	0.57	N/A	$0
Total valid votes/expense limit		38,983	99.31	+0.65	$144,230
Total rejected, unmarked, and declined ballots		272	0.69	–0.65	
Turnout		39,255	43.97	+3.02	
Eligible voters		89,269			
Progressive Conservative hold		Swing		–1.54	
Source: Elections Ontario

2022 Ontario general election: Hamilton East—Stoney Creek
Party	Candidate	Votes	%	±%	Expenditures
Progressive Conservative	Neil Lumsden	12,166	34.60	+5.78	$47,580
New Democratic	Zaigham Butt	9,614	27.34	–23.82	$82,230
Liberal	Jason Farr	7,411	21.07	+8.99	$73,616
Independent	Paul Miller	2,411	6.86	–44.30	$8,083
Green	Cassie Wylie	1,740	4.95	+0.67	$381
Ontario Party	Domenic Diluca	1,052	2.99	–	$4,627
New Blue	Jeffery Raulino	693	1.97	–	$11,785
Electoral Reform	Cameron Rajewski	79	0.22	–	$0
Total valid votes/expense limit		35,166	98.74	–	$121,750
Total rejected, unmarked and declined ballots		449	1.26	–0.08	
Turnout		35,615	40.95	–12.11	
Eligible voters		86,964			
Progressive Conservative gain from New Democratic		Swing		+14.80	
Source: Elections Ontario
