= Hamilton East—Stoney Creek (provincial electoral district) =

Provincial electoral district in Ontario, Canada

Coordinates: 43.230°N 79.733°W

Ontario electoral district
- Hamilton East—Stoney Creek in relation to the other Hamilton ridings

Provincial electoral district
- Legislature: Legislative Assembly of Ontario
MPP
Jeff Beattie
Progressive Conservative
- District created: 2006
- First contested: 2007
- Last contested: 2026

Demographics
- Population (2016): 107,845
- Electors (2018): 84,088
- Area (km²): 76
- Pop. density (per km²): 1,419
- Census division: Hamilton
- Census subdivision: Hamilton

Hamilton East—Stoney Creek is a provincial electoral district in Ontario, Canada, that has been represented in the Legislative Assembly of Ontario since the 2007 provincial election. The riding was formed in 2003 from parts of the former ridings of Hamilton East and Stoney Creek.

Of the 115,709 constituents of the riding, a slight majority were previously constituents in the former riding of Stoney Creek. 58,462 constituents were part of the Stoney Creek riding while 57,247 constituents originated from Hamilton East.

== Geography ==
It consists of the part of the city of Hamilton lying north of the Niagara Escarpment and east of Ottawa Street.

The riding consists of the neighbourhoods of Bartonville, Homeside, Normanhurst, McQuesten, Glenview, Rosedale, Red Hill, Vincent, Gershome, Greenford, Corman, Kentley, Riverdale, Parkview West, Parkview East, Nashdale, Lake Grayside, and the eastern half of The Delta in the former City of Hamilton, as well as the part of the former City of Stoney Creek north of the Niagara Escarpment including the "Old Town", Fruitland and Winona.

== Members of Provincial Parliament ==
Hamilton East—Stoney Creek
Assembly	Years	Member	Party
Riding created from Hamilton East and Stoney Creek
39th	2007–2011	Paul Miller	New Democratic
40th	2011–2014	Paul Miller	New Democratic
41st	2014–2018	Paul Miller	New Democratic
42nd	2018–2022	Paul Miller	New Democratic
42nd	2022–2022	Paul Miller	Independent
43rd	2022–2025	Neil Lumsden	Progressive Conservative
44th	2025–2026	Neil Lumsden	Progressive Conservative
44th	2026–present	Jeff Beattie	Progressive Conservative

== Election results ==
Ontario provincial by-election, September 3, 2026
Party	Candidate	Votes	%	±%
Progressive Conservative	Jeff Beattie	10,500	38.87	–3.20
New Democratic	Monique Taylor	8,886	32.90	+15.30
Liberal	Heino Doessing	6,334	23.45	–8.16
Green	Pascale Marchand	719	2.66	–2.59
New Blue	Wieslawa Derlatka	318	1.18	–0.18
Ontario Party	Heather Curnew	254	0.94	–0.59
Total valid votes		27,011	99.47	+0.16
Total rejected, unmarked, and declined ballots		144	0.53	-0.16
Turnout		27,155	29.40	-14.42
Eligible voters		92,355		
Progressive Conservative hold		Swing		-9.25
Source: Elections Ontario

Winning party in each polling division of Hamilton East—Stoney Creek at the 2025 Ontario general election

2025 Ontario general election
Party	Candidate	Votes	%	±%	Expenditures
Progressive Conservative	Neil Lumsden	16,401	42.07	+7.48	$64,086
Liberal	Heino Doessing	12,323	31.61	+10.54	$22,653
New Democratic	Zaigham Butt	6,862	17.60	–9.74	$60,575
Green	Pascale Marchand	2,049	5.26	+0.31	$8,890
Ontario Party	Heather Curnew	595	1.53	–1.47	$0
New Blue	Wieslawa Derlatka	530	1.36	–0.61	$625
Communist	Drew Garvie	223	0.57	–	$0
Total valid votes/expense limit		38,983	99.31	–	$144,230
Total rejected, unmarked and declined ballots		272	0.69	–0.57	
Turnout		39,255	43.82	+2.87	
Eligible voters		89,584			
Progressive Conservative hold		Swing		–1.53	
Source: Elections Ontario

Winning party in each polling division of Hamilton East—Stoney Creek at the 2022 Ontario general election

2022 Ontario general election
Party	Candidate	Votes	%	±%	Expenditures
Progressive Conservative	Neil Lumsden	12,166	34.60	+5.78	$47,580
New Democratic	Zaigham Butt	9,614	27.34	–23.82	$82,230
Liberal	Jason Farr	7,411	21.07	+8.99	$73,616
Independent	Paul Miller	2,411	6.86	–44.30	$8,083
Green	Cassie Wylie	1,740	4.95	+0.67	$381
Ontario Party	Domenic Diluca	1,052	2.99	–	$4,627
New Blue	Jeffery Raulino	693	1.97	–	$11,785
Electoral Reform	Cameron Rajewski	79	0.22	–	$0
Total valid votes/expense limit		35,166	98.74	–	$121,750
Total rejected, unmarked and declined ballots		449	1.26	–0.08	
Turnout		35,615	40.95	–12.11	
Eligible voters		86,964			
Progressive Conservative gain from New Democratic		Swing		+14.80	
Source: Elections Ontario

2018 Ontario general election
Party	Candidate	Votes	%	±%	Expenditures
New Democratic	Paul Miller	22,518	51.15	+5.28	$67,195
Progressive Conservative	Akash Grewal	12,684	28.81	+10.70	$30,313
Liberal	Jennifer Stebbing	5,320	12.09	−17.78	$17,096
Green	Brian Munroe	1,884	4.28	+0.34	$81
Libertarian	Allan DeRoo	715	1.62	–	none listed
None of the Above	Linda Chenoweth	659	1.50	–	$0
New People's Choice	Lucina Monroy	240	0.55	–	none listed
Total valid votes		44,020	98.66		
Total rejected, unmarked and declined ballots		597	1.34	–0.34	
Turnout		44,617	53.06	+4.22	
Eligible voters		84,088			
New Democratic notional hold		Swing		–2.71	
Source: Elections Ontario

2014 general election redistributed results
Party	Vote	%
New Democratic	18,037	45.87
Liberal	11,741	29.86
Progressive Conservative	7,122	18.11
Green	1,550	3.94
Others	869	2.21

2014 Ontario general election
Party	Candidate	Votes	%	±%
New Democratic	Paul Miller	19,958	46.81	–4.91
Liberal	Ivan Luksic	12,433	29.16	+2.86
Progressive Conservative	David Brown	7,574	17.76	–0.94
Green	Gregory Zink	1,742	4.09	+2.33
Libertarian	Mark Burnison	676	1.59	+0.84
Freedom	Britney Anne Johnston	254	0.60	+0.26
Total valid votes		42,637	98.33	
Total rejected, unmarked and declined ballots		726	1.67	+1.13
Turnout		43,363	48.84	+2.58
Eligible voters		88,782		
New Democratic hold		Swing		–3.88
Source: Elections Ontario

2011 Ontario general election
Party	Candidate	Votes	%	±%
New Democratic	Paul Miller	20,442	51.72	+14.07
Liberal	Mark Cripps	10,397	26.30	–8.55
Progressive Conservative	Nancy Fiorentino	7,395	18.71	–2.83
Green	W. Peter Randall	692	1.75	–3.16
Libertarian	Greg Pattinson	295	0.75	–
Family Coalition	Bob Green Innes	173	0.44	–0.61
Freedom	Philip Doucette	133	0.34	–
Total valid votes		39,527	99.46	
Total rejected, unmarked and declined ballots		216	0.54	–0.42
Turnout		39,743	46.26	–5.10
Eligible voters		85,908		
New Democratic hold		Swing		+11.31
Source: Elections Ontario

2007 Ontario general election
Party	Candidate	Votes	%	±%
New Democratic	Paul Miller	16,272	37.65	+18.12
Liberal	Nerene Virgin	15,062	34.85	–17.09
Progressive Conservative	Tara Crugnale	9,310	21.54	–3.12
Green	Raymond Dartsch	2,122	4.91	–
Family Coalition	Robert W. Innes	452	1.05	–
Total valid votes		43,218	99.04	
Total rejected, unmarked and declined ballots		421	0.96	–
Turnout		43,639	51.36	–
Eligible voters		84,966		
New Democratic notional gain from Liberal		Swing		+17.60
Source: Elections Ontario

2003 general election redistributed results
Party	Vote	%
Liberal	21,518	51.94
Progressive Conservative	10,217	24.66
New Democratic	8,092	19.53
Others	1,600	3.86

== 2007 electoral reform referendum ==
2007 Ontario electoral reform referendum
Side	Votes	%
First Past the Post	23,342	63.7
Mixed member proportional	13,310	36.3
Total valid votes	36,652	100.0

== See also ==
- List of Ontario provincial electoral districts
- Canadian provincial electoral districts
