= Ontario Party =

Provincial political party in Canada

- Leader: Derek Sloan
- President: Tom Marazzo
- Founder: Jay Tysick
- Founded: May 17, 2018
- Split from: Ontario Alliance
- Headquarters: P.O. Box 1645 Belleville ON K8N 0A5
- Ideology: Conservatism (Canadian); Social conservatism; Right-wing populism
- Political position: Right-wing to far-right
- Colours: Blue Zodiac

Website
- www.ontarioparty.ca

The Ontario Party is a minor right-wing populist and socially conservative political party in the Canadian province of Ontario, founded in 2018.

== History ==
The Ontario Party was founded on May 17, 2018, during the 2018 Ontario general election, by members of the Ontario Alliance leadership who left that party, claiming that the CFO and president of the Alliance were not complying with the constitution of the party or the decisions made by the board of directors.

Jay Tysick, the party's first leader, is a former member of the Progressive Conservatives and chief of staff for Ottawa City Councillor Rick Chiarelli. Tysick indicated to media that he was driven to organize a new party after being prevented from running for the PC nomination in the Ottawa-area riding of Carleton. Tysick had been disqualified from standing as a candidate for the Progressive Conservatives due to his socially conservative views.

In 2021, the party selected Joel Shepheard as its leader and Raphael Rosch as its president. Shepheard was replaced in December by former Member of Parliament Derek Sloan. Later that month, Chatham-Kent—Leamington MPP Rick Nicholls joined the party to become its first sitting member in the Legislative Assembly.

The party failed to win any seats in the 2022 Ontario general election. Sloan cited the newness of the party for the results and announced he would stay on as leader.

The Ontario Party was de-registered on February 17, 2023.

On January 28, 2024, Sloan requested to reserve the party name with Elections Ontario; on April 10, 2024, the party was officially re-registered.

== Ideology and principles ==
The Ontario Party is a conservative, right-wing populist party which has been noted for attracting some right-wing Christian group members, anti-vaccination advocates, and organizers of the 2022 Freedom Convoy protests in Ottawa. After the election of Derek Sloan as leader, media and experts began styling the party as "right-wing" to "far-right" in its ideology.

The Ontario Party espouses right-wing and socially-conservative opinions on social issues. The party has raised opposition to the complex sociological theory known as critical race theory, opposing its teaching in Ontario schools. The party supports a role for private education through a voucher system. As party leader, Sloan has emphasized an opposition to what he calls "gender ideology", namely standing in opposition to transgender rights, a position he has maintained since prior to his appointment as leader. The party opposes reforms to the province's sex education curriculum and, in 2021, announced they would be collaborating with Queenie Yu, the founder and leader of the socially-conservative Stop the New Sex-Ed Agenda Party. The party has espoused conspiratorial views, particularly around the World Economic Forum, which the party claims is advancing a "digital ID" program, and which party leader Sloan said is trying to place "microchips in our bodies and in our heads".

As of the 2022 Ontario election, the Ontario Party has emphasized an opposition to COVID-19 public health measures, with party leader Sloan expressing opposition to "authoritarian, unconstitutional lockdowns and mandates".

== Leaders ==
Leader	Term start	Term end	Notes
Jay Tysick	May 17, 2018	2021	
Joel Shepheard	2021	December 14, 2021	
Derek Sloan	December 14, 2021	present	

== Former Ontario Party MPPs ==
Member	District	Tenure	Notes
Rick Nicholls	Chatham-Kent—Leamington	2021–2022	Previously served as a PC MPP from 2011–2021 and an independent in 2021.

== Election results ==
Election results
Election year	Party Leader	No. of overall votes	% of overall total	No. of candidates run	No. of seats won	+/−	Government
2018	Jason Tysick	2,316	0.04%	5 / 124	0 / 124	New Party	Extra-parliamentary
2022	Derek Sloan	84,251	1.81%	105 / 124	0 / 124	▼1	Extra-parliamentary
2025	Derek Sloan	26,262	0.52%	44 / 124	0 / 124	Steady	Extra-parliamentary

=== By-elections ===
By-election	Date	Candidate	Votes	%	Place
Lambton—Kent—Middlesex	May 2, 2024	Cynthia Workman	250	0.91%	7/8
Milton	May 2, 2024	Frederick Weening	111	0.41%	6/9
Scarborough Southwest	September 3, 2026	Gord Elliott	237	1.08%	5/7
York—Simcoe	September 3, 2026	Gerald Auger	244	1.06%	7/7
Hamilton East—Stoney Creek	September 3, 2026	Heather Curnew	254	0.94%	6/6
