= List of postal codes of Canada: M =

This is a list of postal codes in Canada where the first letter is M. Postal codes beginning with M (except M0R and M7R) are located within the city of Toronto in the province of Ontario. Only the first three characters are listed, corresponding to the Forward Sortation Area (FSA).

Canada Post provides a free postal code look-up tool on its website, via its applications for smartphones, and sells hard-copy directories and CD-ROMs. Many vendors also sell validation tools, which allow customers to properly match addresses and postal codes. Hard-copy directories can also be consulted in all post offices, and some libraries.

== Toronto ==
There are currently 103 FSAs in this list. There are no rural FSAs in Toronto, hence no postal codes should start with M0. However, a handful of individual special-purpose codes in the M0R FSA are assigned to "Gateway Commercial Returns, 4567 Dixie Rd, Mississauga" (which is actually within the L postal code area) as a merchandise returns label for freepost returns to high-volume vendors such as Amazon and the Shopping Channel.

M1A
Not assigned

M2A
Not assigned

M3A
North York
(Parkwoods)

M4A
North York
(Victoria Village)

M5A
Downtown Toronto
(Regent Park / Harbourfront)

M6A
North York
(Lawrence Manor / Lawrence Heights)

M7A
Queen's Park

Ontario Provincial Government

M8A
Not assigned

M9A
Etobicoke
(Islington Avenue)

M1B
Scarborough
(Malvern / Rouge)

M2B
Not assigned

M3B
North York
(Don Mills)
North

M4B
East York
(Parkview Hill / Woodbine Gardens)

M5B
Downtown Toronto
(Garden District, Ryerson)

M6B
North York
(Glencairn)

M7B
Not assigned

M8B
Not assigned

M9B
Etobicoke
(West Deane Park / Princess Gardens / Martin Grove / Islington / Cloverdale)

M1C
Scarborough
(Rouge Hill / Port Union / Highland Creek)

M2C
Not assigned

M3C
North York
(Don Mills)
South
(Flemingdon Park)

M4C
East York
(Woodbine Heights)

M5C
Downtown Toronto
(St. James Town)

M6C
York
(Humewood-Cedarvale)

M7C
Not assigned

M8C
Not assigned

M9C
Etobicoke
(Eringate / Bloordale Gardens / Old Burnhamthorpe / Markland Wood)

M1E
Scarborough
(Guildwood / Morningside / West Hill)

M2E
Not assigned

M3E
Not assigned

M4E
East Toronto
(The Beaches)

M5E
Downtown Toronto
(Berczy Park)

M6E
York
(Caledonia-Fairbanks)

M7E
Not assigned

M8E
Not assigned

M9E
Not assigned

M1G
Scarborough
(Woburn)

M2G
Not assigned

M3G
Not assigned

M4G
East York
(Leaside)

M5G
Downtown Toronto
(Central Bay Street)

M6G
Downtown Toronto
(Christie)

M7G
Not assigned

M8G
Not assigned

M9G
Not assigned

M1H
Scarborough
(Cedarbrae)

M2H
North York
(Hillcrest Village)

M3H
North York
(Bathurst Manor / Wilson Heights / Downsview North)

M4H
East York
(Thorncliffe Park)

M5H
Downtown Toronto
(Richmond / Adelaide / King)

M6H
West Toronto
(Dufferin / Dovercourt Village)

M7H
Not assigned

M8H
Not assigned

M9H
Not assigned

M1J
Scarborough
(Scarborough Village)

M2J
North York
(Fairview / Henry Farm / Oriole)

M3J
North York
(Northwood Park / York University)

M4J
East York
East Toronto
(The Danforth
East)

M5J
Downtown Toronto
(Harbourfront East / Union Station / Toronto Islands)

M6J
West Toronto
(Little Portugal / Trinity)

M7J
Not assigned

M8J
Not assigned

M9J
Not assigned

M1K
Scarborough
(Kennedy Park / Ionview / East Birchmount Park)

M2K
North York
(Bayview Village)

M3K
North York
(Downsview)
East
(CFB Toronto)

M4K
East Toronto
(The Danforth West / Riverdale)

M5K
Downtown Toronto
(Toronto Dominion Centre / Design Exchange)

M6K
West Toronto
(Brockton / Parkdale Village / Exhibition Place)

M7K
Not assigned

M8K
Not assigned

M9K
Not assigned

M1L
Scarborough
(Golden Mile / Clairlea / Oakridge)

M2L
North York
(York Mills / Silver Hills)

M3L
North York
(Downsview)
West

M4L
East Toronto
(India Bazaar / The Beaches West)

M5L
Downtown Toronto
(Commerce Court / Victoria Hotel)

M6L
North York
(North Park / Maple Leaf Park / Upwood Park)

M7L
Not assigned

M8L
Not assigned

M9L
North York
(Humber Summit)

M1M
Scarborough
(Cliffside / Cliffcrest / Scarborough Village West)

M2M
North York
(Willowdale / Newtonbrook)

M3M
North York
(Downsview)
Central

M4M
East Toronto
(Studio District)

M5M
North York
(Bedford Park / Lawrence Manor East)

M6M
York
(Del Ray / Mount Dennis / Keelsdale and Silverthorn)

M7M
Not assigned

M8M
Not assigned

M9M
North York
(Humberlea / Emery)

M1N
Scarborough
(Birch Cliff / Cliffside West)

M2N
North York
(Willowdale)
South

M3N
North York
(Downsview)
Northwest

M4N
Central Toronto
(Lawrence Park)

M5N
Central Toronto
(Roselawn)

M6N
York
(Runnymede / The Junction North)

M7N
Not assigned

M8N
Not assigned

M9N
York
(Weston)

M1P
Scarborough
(Dorset Park / Wexford Heights / Scarborough Town Centre)

M2P
North York
(York Mills West)

M3P
Not assigned

M4P
Central Toronto
(North Toronto East /Yonge-Eglinton)

M5P
Central Toronto
(Forest Hill North & West)

M6P
West Toronto
(High Park / The Junction South)

M7P
Not assigned

M8P
Not assigned

M9P
Etobicoke
(Westmount)

M1R
Scarborough
(Wexford / Maryvale)

M2R
North York
(Willowdale)
West

M3R
Not assigned

M4R
Central Toronto
(North Toronto West / Lytton Park)

M5R
Central Toronto
(The Annex / Casa Loma / Yorkville)

M6R
West Toronto
(Parkdale / Roncesvalles)

M7R
Mississauga
Canada Post Gateway Processing Centre
(Enclave of L4W)

M8R
Not assigned

M9R
Etobicoke
(Kingsview Village / St. Phillips / Martin Grove Gardens / Richview Gardens)

M1S
Scarborough
(Agincourt)

M2S
Not assigned

M3S
Not assigned

M4S
Central Toronto
(Davisville)

M5S
Downtown Toronto
(University of Toronto / Harbord)

M6S
West Toronto
(Runnymede / Swansea)

M7S
Not assigned

M8S
Not assigned

M9S
Not assigned

M1T
Scarborough
(Clarks Corners / Tam O'Shanter / Sullivan)

M2T
Not assigned

M3T
Not assigned

M4T
Central Toronto
(Moore Park / Summerhill East)

M5T
Downtown Toronto
(Kensington Market / Chinatown / Grange Park)

M6T
Not assigned

M7T
Not assigned

M8T
Not assigned

M9T
Not assigned

M1V
Scarborough
(Milliken / Agincourt North / Steeles East / L'Amoreaux East)

M2V
Not assigned

M3V
Not assigned

M4V
Central Toronto
(Summerhill West / Rathnelly / South Hill / Forest Hill SE / Deer Park)

M5V
Downtown Toronto
(CN Tower / King and Spadina / Railway Lands / Harbourfront West / Bathurst Quay / South Niagara / Island airport)

M6V
Not assigned

M7V
Not assigned

M8V
Etobicoke
(New Toronto / Mimico South / Humber Bay Shores)

M9V
Etobicoke
(South Steeles / Silverstone / Humbergate / Jamestown / Mount Olive / Beaumond Heights / Thistletown / Albion Gardens)

M1W
Scarborough
(Steeles West / L'Amoreaux West)

M2W
Not assigned

M3W
Not assigned

M4W
Downtown Toronto
(Rosedale)

M5W
Downtown Toronto
Stn A PO Boxes
25 The Esplanade
(Enclave of M5E)

M6W
Not assigned

M7W
Not assigned

M8W
Etobicoke
(Alderwood / Long Branch)

M9W
Etobicoke
Northwest
(Clairville / Humberwood / Woodbine Downs / West Humber / Kipling Heights / Rexdale / Elms / Tandridge / Old Rexdale)

M1X
Scarborough
(Upper Rouge)

M2X
Not assigned

M3X
Not assigned

M4X
Downtown Toronto
(St. James Town / Cabbagetown)

M5X
Downtown Toronto
(First Canadian Place / Underground city)

M6X
Not assigned

M7X
Not assigned

M8X
Etobicoke
(The Kingsway / Montgomery Road / Old Mill North)

M9X
Not assigned

M1Y
Not assigned

M2Y
Not assigned

M3Y
Not assigned

M4Y
Downtown Toronto
(Church and Wellesley)

M5Y
Not assigned

M6Y
Not assigned

M7Y
East Toronto
Business reply mail Processing Centre
969 Eastern
(Enclave of M4L)

M8Y
Etobicoke
(Old Mill South / King's Mill Park / Sunnylea / Humber Bay / Mimico NE / The Queensway East / Royal York South East / Kingsway Park South East)

M9Y
Not assigned

M1Z
Not assigned

M2Z
Not assigned

M3Z
Not assigned

M4Z
Not assigned

M5Z
Not assigned

M6Z
Not assigned

M7Z
Not assigned

M8Z
Etobicoke
(Mimico NW / The Queensway West / South of Bloor / Kingsway Park South West / Royal York South West)

M9Z
Not assigned

== Most populated FSAs ==
1. M2N, 75,100
2. M1B, 65,555
3. M2J, 61,761
4. M5V, 59,912
5. M9V, 53,878

== Least populated FSAs ==
1. M7A, 5
2. M5C, 3,149
3. M5H, 3,248
4. M2P, 7,546
5. M3K, 7,865
