= 2026 Scarborough Southwest provincial by-election =

2026 provincial by-election in Ontario, Canada

- September 3, 2026

Riding of Scarborough Southwest
	First party	Second party	Third party
	NDP	LIB	PC
Candidate	Fatima Shaban	Ahsanul Hafiz	Noor Tarun
Party	New Democratic	Liberal	Progressive Conservative
Last election	42.89%	22.94%	30.65%
Popular vote	8,914	6,674	5,148
Percentage	40.47%	30.30%	23.37%
Swing	▼2.42 pp	▲7.36 pp	▼7.28 pp
MPP before election
Vacant (Note: The seat was last held by Doly Begum (New Democratic) until her resignation on February 3, 2026.)
Elected MPP
Fatima Shaban
New Democratic

A by-election was held on September 3, 2026, in the provincial riding of Scarborough Southwest in Ontario, Canada, following the resignation of incumbent NDP MPP Doly Begum on February 3, 2026.

The writ for the by-election was issued on August 5 with a vote to be held on September 3, 2026, concurrently with by-elections in Hamilton East—Stoney Creek and York—Simcoe. The election was won by Fatima Shaban, who held the seat for the Ontario NDP.

== Background ==
On February 2, 2026, Prime Minister Mark Carney announced that Bill Blair, a former cabinet minister, would resign as member of Parliament for the federal riding of Scarborough Southwest to accept an appointment as Canada’s High Commissioner to the United Kingdom. Blair had previously served as minister of public safety and minister of national defence.

On February 3, the Liberal Party of Canada announced Doly Begum as their candidate for the resulting by-election. Begum was serving as a member of Provincial Parliament for the provincial riding of Scarborough Southwest and the Deputy Leader of the ONDP. She resigned from her seat on the same day as well as her membership in the ONDP.

Premier Doug Ford was not expected to announce a by-election date until after the 2026 Scarborough Southwest federal by-election was held on April 13, 2026.

== Candidates ==
=== New Democratic Party ===
Fatima Shaban, a Canadian community organizer and politician, was nominated as the party's by-election candidate at the Scarborough Southwest NDP Electoral District Association nomination meeting on April 28, 2026.

Shaban has been active in affordable housing advocacy and has served as treasurer of the Regent Heights Public School Council. She graduated with a degree in Criminology and Socio-Legal Studies.

Shaban was the New Democratic Party candidate in Scarborough Southwest in the 2025 Canadian federal election, and again in the 2026 federal by-election following the resignation of Bill Blair.

Following the resignation of MPP Doly Begum, Shaban won the Ontario NDP nomination for the 2026 Scarborough Southwest provincial by-election.

Also running for the nomination was Khalid Ahmed, former Ontario NDP candidate in Don Valley West, Don Valley East, and Pickering—Uxbridge, and social worker Veronica Javier.

=== Progressive Conservative Party ===
Family physician Asm Noorullah Tarun was chosen at a nomination meeting held on July 9, 2026. Other candidates for the nomination were paralegal and community advocate Ayesha Sardar and HR professional Gazi Sijan. Accountant Murshed Nizam had also been announced as a candidate for the nomination but was not on the ballot when the vote was conducted.

Tarun was previously the Conservative Party of Canada candidate in the 2025 Canadian federal election in Scarborough Southwest.

Gary Crawford, a former Toronto City Councillor for Scarborough Southwest from 2010 to 2023 and Progressive Conservative candidate in the 2023 Scarborough—Guildwood provincial by-election, declined to run as the PC candidate due to family reasons. Crawford had been asked by Premier Ford to run under the party banner.

=== Liberal Party ===
The Scarborough Southwest Ontario Liberal Electoral District Association held an open nomination meeting on May 9, 2026, using a ranked ballot. In addition to the four candidates on the nomination ballot, Sharmina Nasrin, a former constituency office worker for Whitby Progressive Conservative MPP Lorne Coe, announced her candidacy in April but withdrew prior to the meeting. Ali Demircan, President of the Federation of Canadian Turkish Associations, and Toronto city councillor Parthi Kandavel were reported to be potential candidates, but did not run. With over 1,000 total votes cast, party organizer and pizza franchisee Ahsanul Hafiz won the nomination, defeating Beaches—East York MP Nathaniel Erskine-Smith on the third and final ballot by a vote of 718 to 699. 2025 Ontario general election candidate Qadira Jackson and immigration consultant Mahmuda Nasrin were eliminated in earlier rounds. Erskine-Smith was also a prospective candidate in the upcoming Ontario Liberal Party leadership election. During the race, Hafiz and Jackson had formed a strategic pact encouraging their respective supporters to rank the other candidate second on their ballots.

==== Controversies ====
During the nomination race, screenshots and archived Facebook activity tied to Ahsanul Hafiz were made aware within Liberal circles and the Bangladeshi-Canadian community such as posts like supporting the death penalty for Bangladeshi political opponents, and having shared pornography depicting incest and sexual violence in 2011. Hafiz's supporters and campaign pushed back against internal concerns about whether these posts should disqualify him from the nomination race as the death penalty posts were taken out of political context and stated that the party were aware of the sexual violence post while being vetted by its greenlight committee.

Following the vote, Erskine-Smith alleged irregularities in the process, claiming that some individuals were permitted to vote without proper identification while his campaign questioned the party's executive decision to invalidate 1,800 memberships prior to the meeting. He also suggested that the party establishment had worked to deny him the nomination by sending paid staff from the party to work for his oppositions. Interim party leader John Fraser defended the fairness of the process and stated that any allegations of misconduct required proof.

On May 12, 2026, after consulting his team, Erskine-Smith formally appealed the outcome to the party's arbitration committee, highlighting that 34 more ballots were counted than were cast and the fact that the party allowed the use of “Amazon orders” as proof of identity during the vote. Erskine-Smith called for a new nomination meeting or for the party to appoint a candidate, while ruling himself out as a candidate. This led to questions about whether party leaders should have a say on candidate nominations, with some such as former Ontario Liberal cabinet minister John Milloy comparing it the 1983 Progressive Conservative leadership election where men from homeless shelters were bussed in to vote for Brian Mulroney. It also raised questions whether non-citizens who are barred from the voting in Liberal Party of Canada nomination races, should have the ability to vote in nominations, as Hafiz's campaign manager, Ted Lojko, ran the controversial nomination of Han Dong for the Don Valley North federal riding in 2019 which was noted for bussing-in international students of Asian origin.

On May 24, the party’s three-person arbitration committee, which included former cabinet minister David Zimmer, dismissed the appeal, concluding that there were no irregularities that compromised the integrity or final result of the vote. The committee determined that the 34-vote discrepancy was a technical administrative error caused by volunteers failing to cross names off the eligible voters list when handing out ballots.

=== Green Party ===
On July 14, 2026, the Green Party announced that Mark Bekkering would be the candidate. Bekkering previously ran in Scarborough Southwest in the 2025 provincial election.

=== New Blue Party ===
On July 18, 2026, the New Blue Party of Ontario announced that Chartered Professional Accountant Chris Rees would be the candidate. He was the New Blue Party candidate in Ajax in the 2025 provincial election.

== Opinion polling ==
Polling firm	Last date of polling	Link	NDP	PC	Liberal	Green	Others	Sample size	Polling method	Lead
Mainstreet Research	February 22, 2026	HTML	19	29	43	4	5	464	Phone	14

== Result ==
Ontario provincial by-election, September 3, 2026: Scarborough Southwest Resignation of Doly Begum to run in a federal by-election
Party	Candidate	Votes	%	±%
New Democratic	Fatima Shaban	8,914	40.47	-2.42
Liberal	Ahsanul Hafiz	6,674	30.30	+7.36
Progressive Conservative	Noor Tarun	5,148	23.37	-7.27
Green	Mark Bekkering	753	3.38	-0.14
Ontario Party	Gord Elliott	237	1.08	–
New Blue	Chris Rees	178	0.81	–
Independent	Michael Perdelwitz	129	0.59	–
Total valid votes		22,033	99.49	+0.18
Total rejected, unmarked, and declined ballots		113	0.51	-0.18
Turnout		22,146	26.65	-15.08
Eligible voters		83,115		
New Democratic hold		Swing		-4.89
Source: Elections Ontario

== Previous result ==
2025 Ontario general election: Scarborough Southwest
Party	Candidate	Votes	%	±%	Expenditures
New Democratic	Doly Begum	14,557	42.89	–4.78	$120,161
Progressive Conservative	Addie Daramola	10,400	30.65	+3.04	$45,342
Liberal	Qadira Jackson	7,786	22.94	+4.38	$39,544
Green	Mark Bekkering	1,194	3.52	–0.02	$3,247
Total valid votes/expense limit		33,937	99.31	–	$131,827
Total rejected, unmarked and declined ballots		235	0.69	–0.01	
Turnout		34,172	41.73	–2.61	
Eligible voters		81,880			
New Democratic hold		Swing		–3.91	
Source: Elections Ontario

== Aftermath ==
John Michael McGrath writing for TVO today, cited the dismissal of Erskine-Smith appeal was part of a growing democratic deficit in Ontario politics and raised concerns that political power was being concentrated in hands of the few.

After the victory of Shaban, some Liberals such as Supriya Dwivedi, blamed the party loss on the gatekeeping of the Ontario Liberal Party insiders. When asked about the result, Fraser defended how the nomination played out and stated that it was fair.

Scott Stinson and Michael McGrath raised issues with the party result. Stinson writing for the National Post described the party result in Scarborough Southwest alongside Hamilton East—Stoney Creek and York—Simcoe as evidence that the next leader will not be inheriting a party as the government-in-waiting. Michael McGrath described the riding winnable for the Liberals, who has held it provincially before their loss in 2018 Ontario general election, Hafiz campaign as lacklustre, and that Shaban will be given the chance to improve on her performance making it harder to unseat her in future elections. Both Stinson and Michael McGrath found the party explanations as spin with the Michael McGrath stated that the provincial brand hold responsibility since their federal Liberals are winning seats in Ontario at the same time. Michael McGrath suggested that Ontario Liberals need to consider why their party would rather lose races as long as a certain kind of candidate does not win and that they should not use the same complacent stories about how neither the events nor the results matter.

Sam Cooper, an investigative journalist, revealed on September 19th, that Hafiz was investigated and reprimanded by Ontario Soccer for violating their code of conduct due to him platforming Yusuf Ali Talukder, a convicted child sex offender.

Erskine-Smith, used the Scarborough Southwest nomination in a Substack article on June 30th advocating for the need to clean up politics within the province and Ontario Liberal Party. He also cited that apparent lack of reflection about the need to change after the nomination race as reason for not seeking the leadership and that it will be left to somebody else to take it on. During his run for city council in Ward 19 Beaches—East York, Erskine-Smith stated that he would have not ran if he was aware of what was going to happen, stated that the party needs to do things differently and that he has moved on.

== See also ==
- 2026 Hamilton East—Stoney Creek provincial by-election
- 2026 York—Simcoe provincial by-election
- List of Ontario by-elections
