= Clairlea =

- Neighbourhood
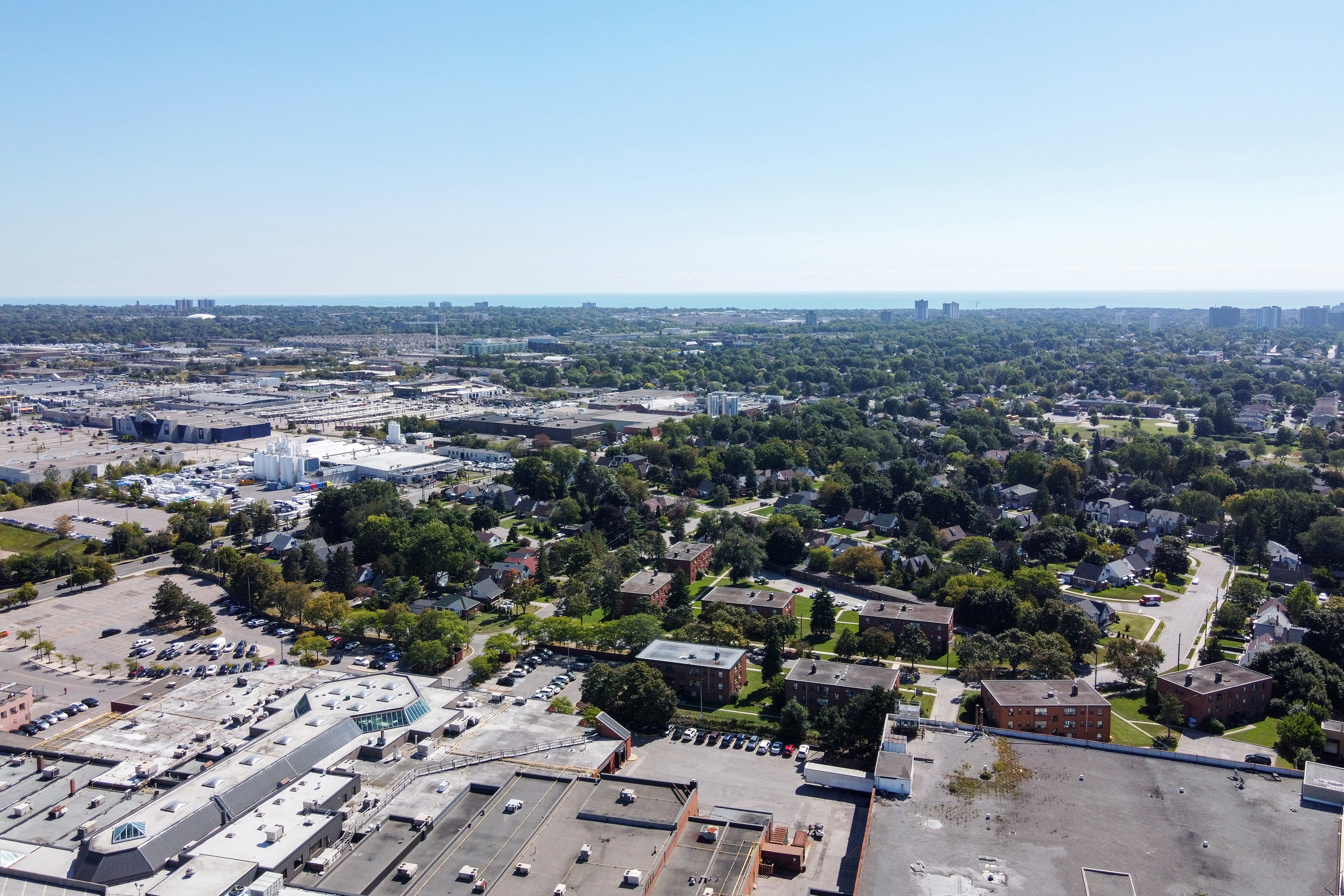
- Aerial view of Clairlea in 2023

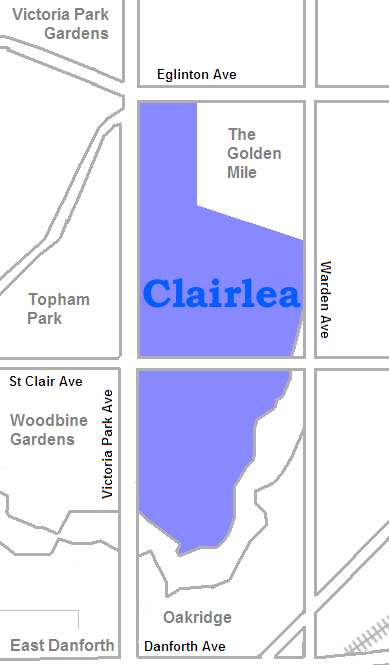
- Vicinity

- Location within Toronto
- Coordinates: 43°42′35″N 79°17′27″W
- Country: Canada
- Province: Ontario
- City: Toronto
- Established municipality: 1850 Scarborough Township
- Changed municipality: 1998 Toronto from City of Scarborough

Government
  - MP: Doly Begum (Scarborough Southwest)
  - MPP: Fatima Shaban (Scarborough Southwest)
  - Councillor: Vacant (Ward 20 Scarborough Southwest)

Clairlea is a neighbourhood in Toronto, Ontario, Canada that features well treed streets and detached homes with large backyards. The neighbourhood is located in east Toronto just east of Victoria Park Avenue.

To the north, it is bounded by Eglinton Avenue and to the south by Taylor-Massey Creek. The neighborhood is well-served by transit including the TTC Warden Subway Station, Victoria Park Subway Station, Line 5 Eglinton, and the Don Valley Parkway. A large portion of Clairlea-Birchmount is taken up by parks and recreation trails, the Eglinton Square Shopping Centre and other large retail developments along Eglinton Avenue East.

The residents of Clairlea enjoy the close proximity to Lake Ontario as Clairlea is situated 5 kilometers north of Silver Birch Beach (located in the Beaches neighbourhood).

The neighbourhood is recently undergoing several changes including new condo developments and major infrastructure improvements. The re-development of Warden Subway Station, which began in November 2023, is a comprehensive urban revitalization plan that will breathe new life into the Warden and St. Clair Ave area. When complete, the station will be transformed into a “state-of-the-art transit hub” with new housing and new public spaces around Taylor Massey Creek.

== History ==
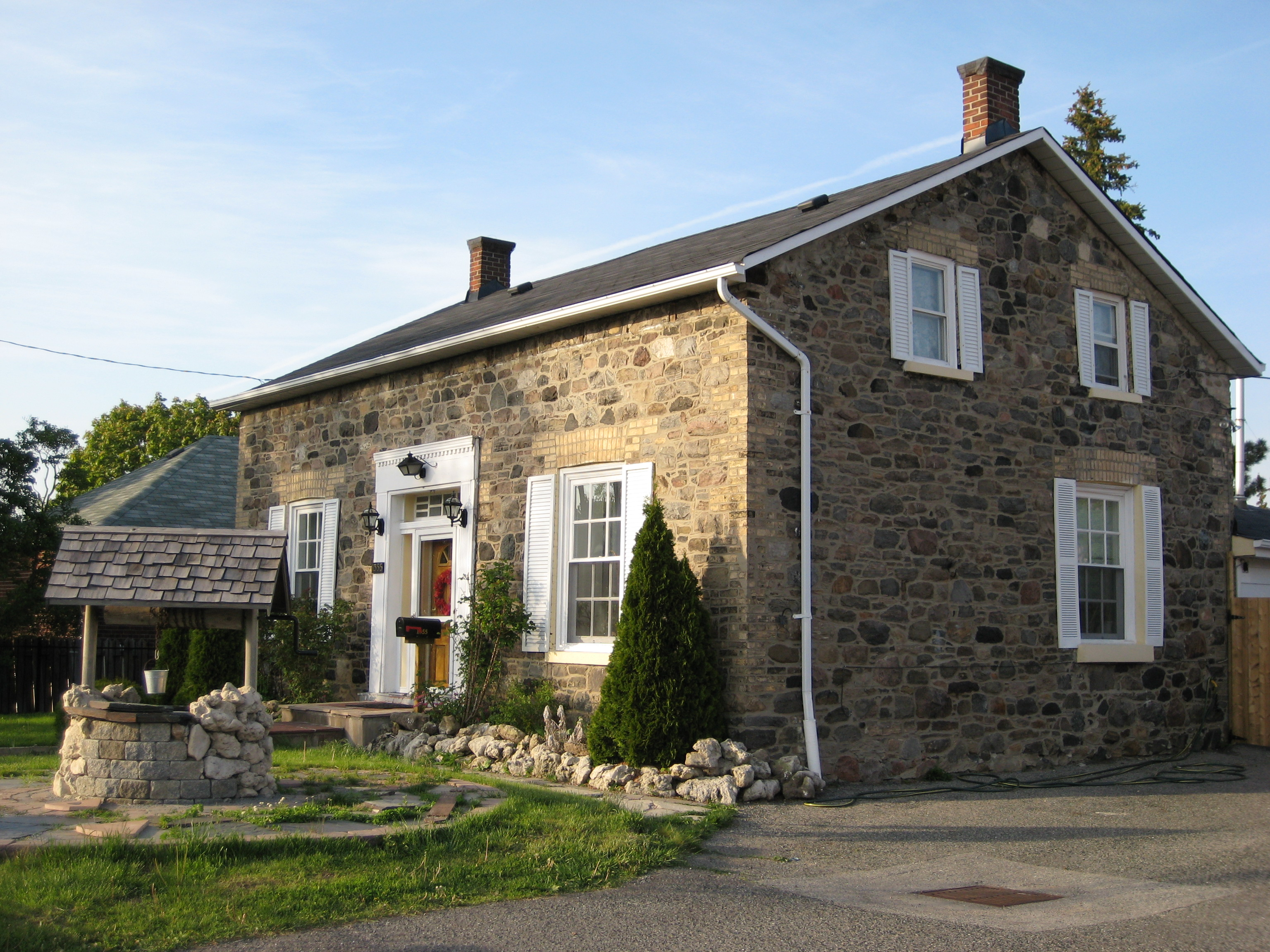
Built in 1857, the William Devenish House is an example of a 19th-century residence in Clairlea.

In the 19th century the intersection of St. Clair and Victoria Park was home to a small village named Moffat's Corners, and the rest of the region was rural. Clairlea was one of the first parts of the former city of Scarborough to be developed as a Toronto suburb, being transformed in the early 1950s. A major employer and landmark is Providence Healthcare, established on St. Clair in 1962. Today, it consists of a hospital specializing in rehabilitation and complex continuing care, a nursing home called the Cardinal Ambrozic Houses of Providence, and Providence Community Centre, which offers clinics and support programs for seniors and caregivers. Today it is a middle to upper-middle income neighbourhood that features many family homes and mature streets.

== Education ==
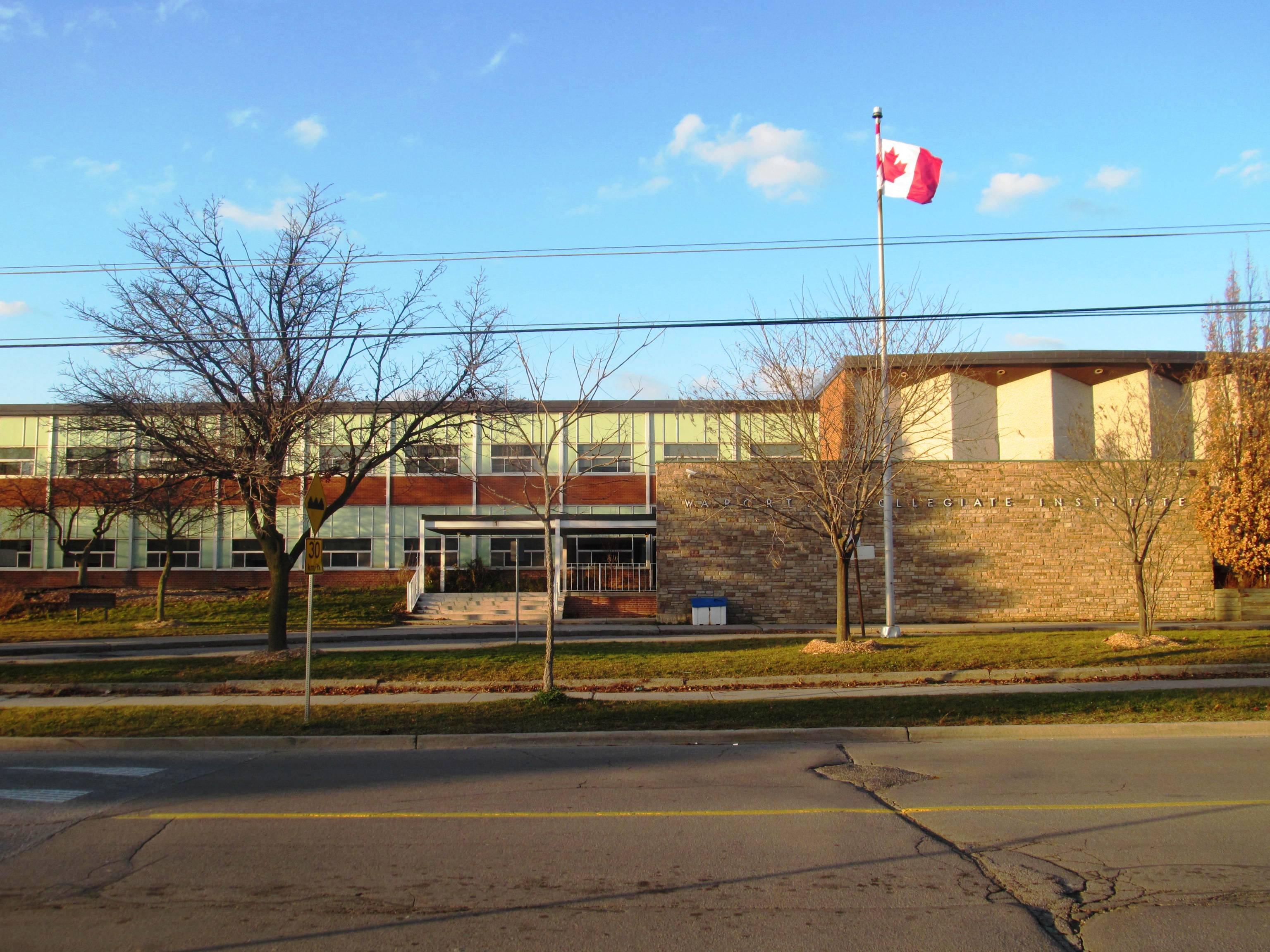
W. A. Porter Collegiate Institute is a secondary school situated in Clairlea.

Two public school boards operate schools within Clairlea, the Toronto Catholic District School Board (TCDSB), and the Toronto District School Board (TDSB). TCDSB is a public separate school board, whereas TDSB is a public secular school board.

TDSB operates several institutions in the neighbourhood, including one public secondary school, W. A. Porter Collegiate Institute. In addition to a secondary school, TDSB and the TCDSB also operates the following elementary schools:

- Clairlea Public School is located on Rosalind Crescent in Scarborough, first opened in 1952. Starting in 2002, the French Immersion program was introduced to the school.
- Regent Heights Public School is an elementary school that began in 1921 as Regent's Park Public School in a one room schoolhouse. With the formation of Scarborough Public School Area # 1, Regent's Park School was separated from Oakridge and construction began on a new brick school on its current location, which was completed and opened on September 15, 1947. Between 1951 and 1952, 12 classrooms and a gym were added with the two existing classrooms later converted to a library in 1972. In 1954, the school was renamed to "Regent Heights" to avoid confusion with the Regent Park community in Toronto. It became a junior school operating from Kindergarten to Grade 6 with the opening of Samuel Hearne Senior Public School. In September 1975, the French Immersion program was introduced, though the program was relocated to Clairlea P.S. in 2002. Regent Heights now operates from kindergarten to grade 8 after Oakridge Jr. and Samuel Hearne Sr. increased its enrollment, and the school now enrols 560 pupils.
- Our Lady of Fatima School is a Roman Catholic school located on 3176 St. Clair Avenue East. It opened in September 1953 in the original Two stores school building and later underwent expansion and change. The older building was demolished and replaced by a new three storey school in 2004. During that period, students were taught in the old St. Aloysius school in East York during reconstruction. The school is named after Our Lady of Fátima, a title used by the Blessed Virgin Mary sighted in 1917 by three Portuguese children. It shares the name with a church located next door.

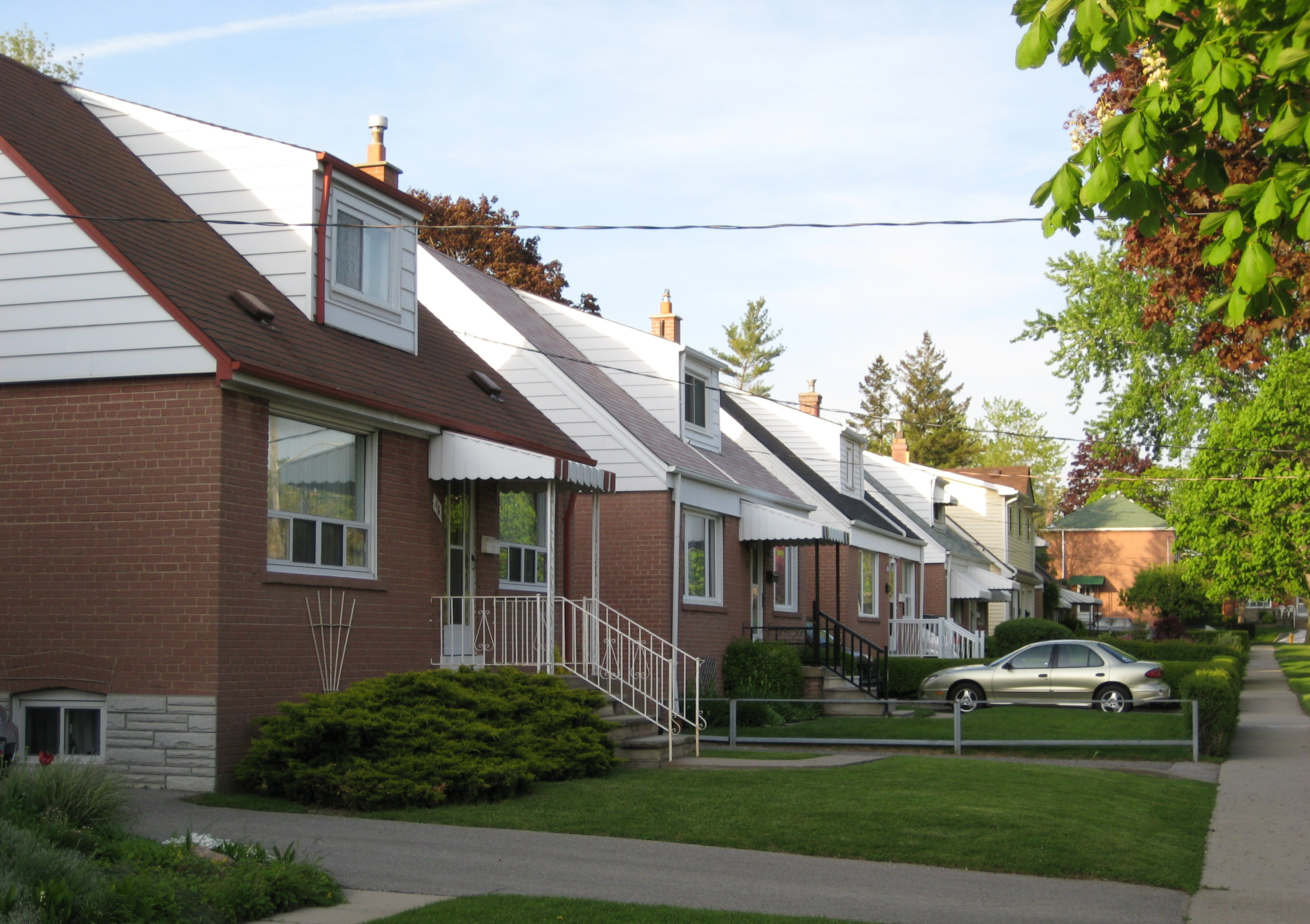
Residences in Clairlea

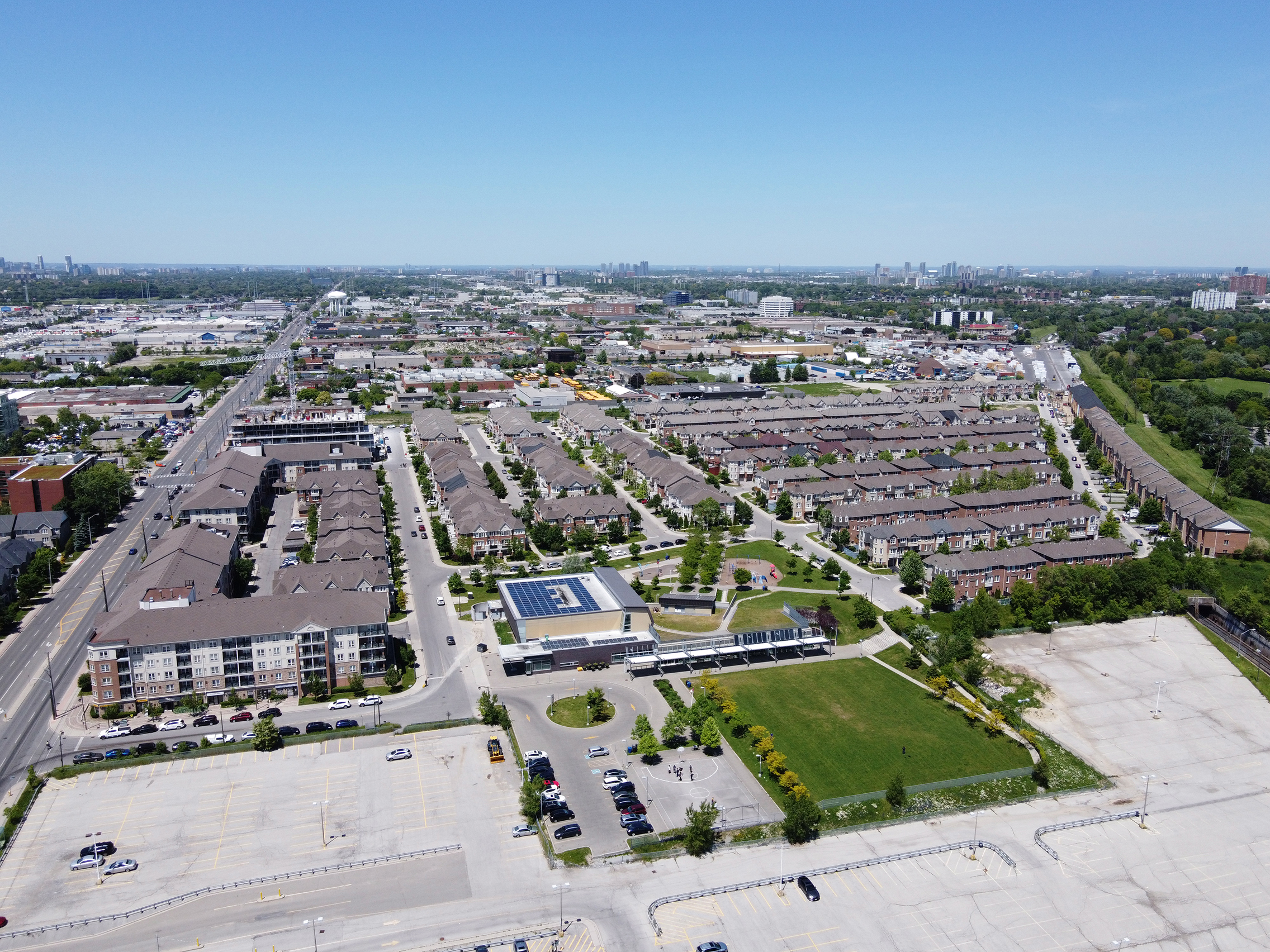
Aerial view of Warden Hilltop Community Centre and nearby housing in 2024

Because TCDSB does not operate a secondary school in Clairlea, TCDSB students residing in Clairlea attend secondary schools in adjacent neighbourhoods.

The French first language school boards Conseil scolaire Viamonde (CSV) and the Conseil scolaire catholique MonAvenir (CSCM) also serves students residing Clairlea. However, neither school board operates an institution in the neighbourhood, requiring them to attend CSV or CSCM schools in adjacent neighbourhoods.

== Recreation ==
The Gus Harris Trail (Warden Woods Park) is a landmark of the neighbourhood, offering some downtown nature following Massey Creek east of Pharmacy Avenue to St. Clair Avenue.

Dentonia Park Golf Course, located on the east side of Victoria Park Avenue, just north of Danforth Avenue is an 18-hole, par 54 course built over an elevated landscape.

Warden Hilltop Community Centre holds the distinction of being the first public building in Toronto to be LEED (Leadership in Energy and Environmental Design) Silver certified. It features a geothermal heating and cooling system, green roof and solar power. The centre includes a double gym, weight room, teaching kitchen and preschool area. The Warden Hilltop Community Centre is named after Hilltop Boarding and Riding Stables, also known as the Three Gaits Stables, that was previously on the site.
