= Ionview =

- Neighbourhood
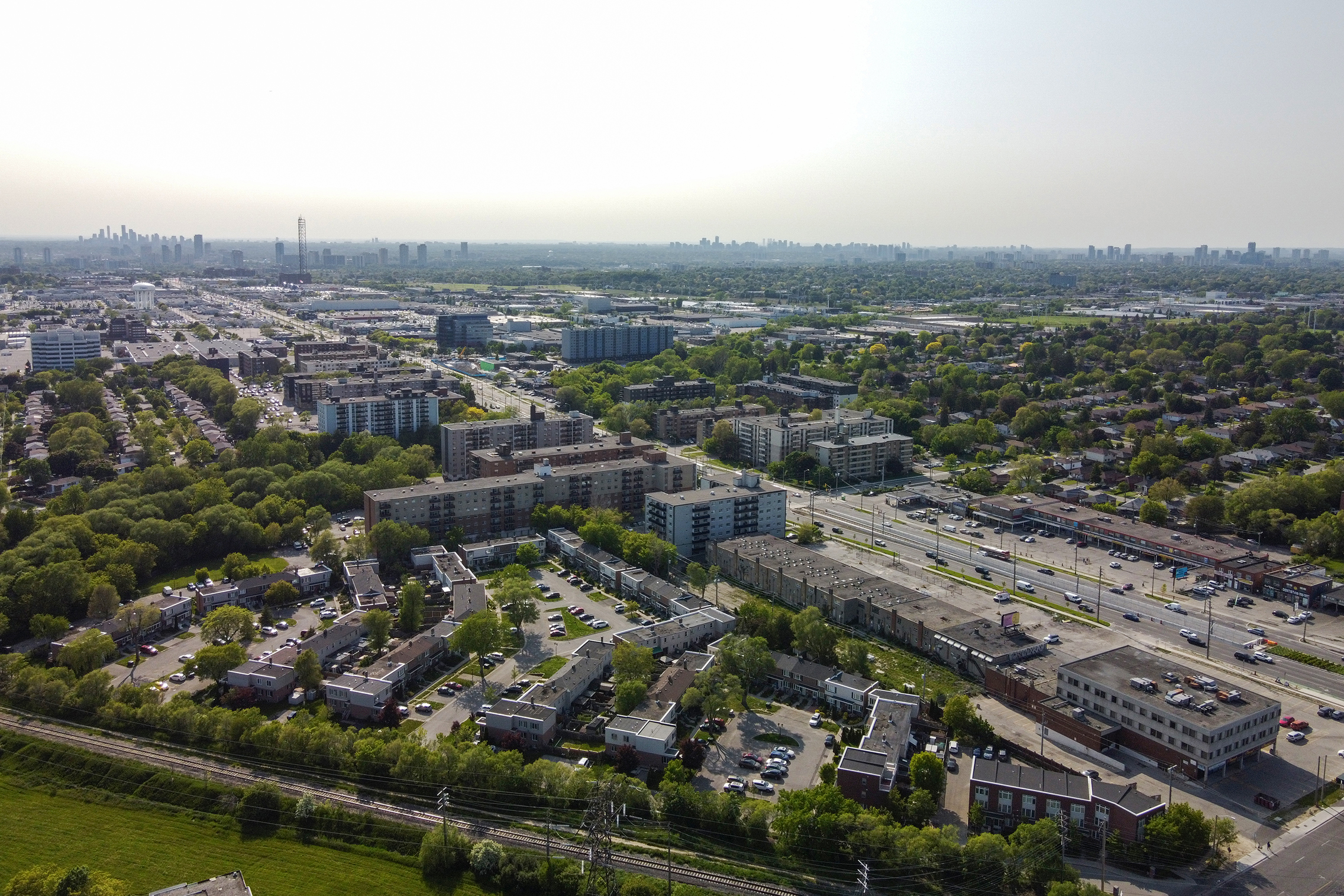
- Ionview Road at Eglinton Avenue in 2023

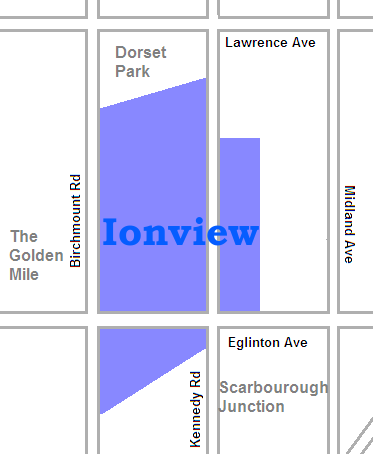
- Coordinates: 43°43′53″N 79°16′16″W
- Country: Canada
- Province: Ontario
- City: Toronto
- Established: 1850 Scarborough Township
- Changed municipality: 1998 Toronto from City of Scarborough

Government
  - MP: Bill Blair (Scarborough Southwest)
  - MPP: Doly Begum (Scarborough Southwest)
  - Councillor: Michael Thompson (Ward 37 Scarborough Centre)

Ionview is a neighbourhood in Toronto, Ontario, Canada, in the district of Scarborough. It is bounded by Birchmount Road to the west, the hydro transmission corridor north of Ranstone Gardens to the north, the CNR railway to the east, and Eglinton Avenue East, Kennedy Road and the CNR railway to the south.

Ionview is contained within the federal and provincial riding of Scarborough Southwest. It is represented by Doly Begum in the Ontario Legislature and Bill Blair in the Parliament of Canada. The Toronto Police Service's 41 Division is based in the neighbourhood.

== History ==
Portions of the area comprising modern Ionview were once contained in the former village of Wexford, founded in the 1840s, and Scarborough Junction, established in 1873. The area remained generally rural until the postwar housing boom of the 1940s and 1950s.

Ionview is a predominantly working-class neighbourhood, with 63% of the population residing in rented accommodation as of 2001, the majority in apartment towers. There was a higher percentage of children aged 0–4 in Ionview than the Toronto average as of 2001.

== Recreation ==
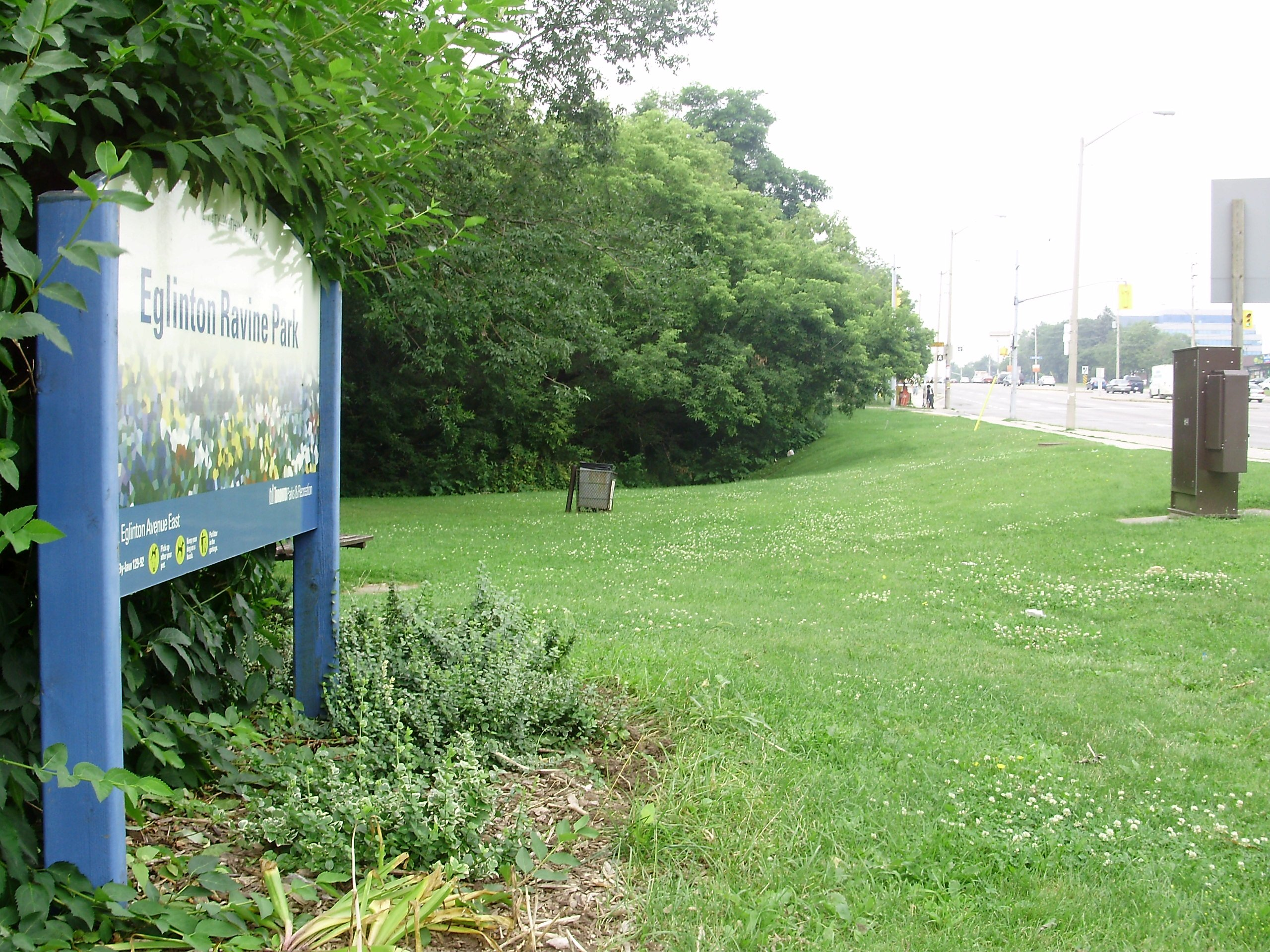
Eglinton Ravine Park in southern Ionview

The Taylor-Massey Creek, an eastern tributary of the Don River, flows through the Eglinton Ravine in the southwest portion of Ionview. Green space within the neighbourhood includes Eglinton Ravine Park, extending from Eglinton Avenue East to the railway, centrally located Ionview Park, and Jack Goodlad Community Park in the north.

Municipal parks in Ionview are managed by the Toronto Parks, Forestry and Recreation Division.

== Transportation ==
The neighbourhood is well-connected to the rest of the city by public transit, served by the Toronto Transit Commission's (TTC) bus routes 17 Birchmount, 34 Eglinton East, and 43 Kennedy bus routes. Kennedy station, the eastern terminus of Line 2 Bloor–Danforth and Line 5 Eglinton, is immediately south of Ionview.

Eglinton Avenue East is a major east-west road that passes through Ionview.
