= Sol Mamakwa =

Canadian politician (born 1970s)

Sol Mamakwa MPP
- ᓴᐧᓬ ᒣᒣᑫᐧ
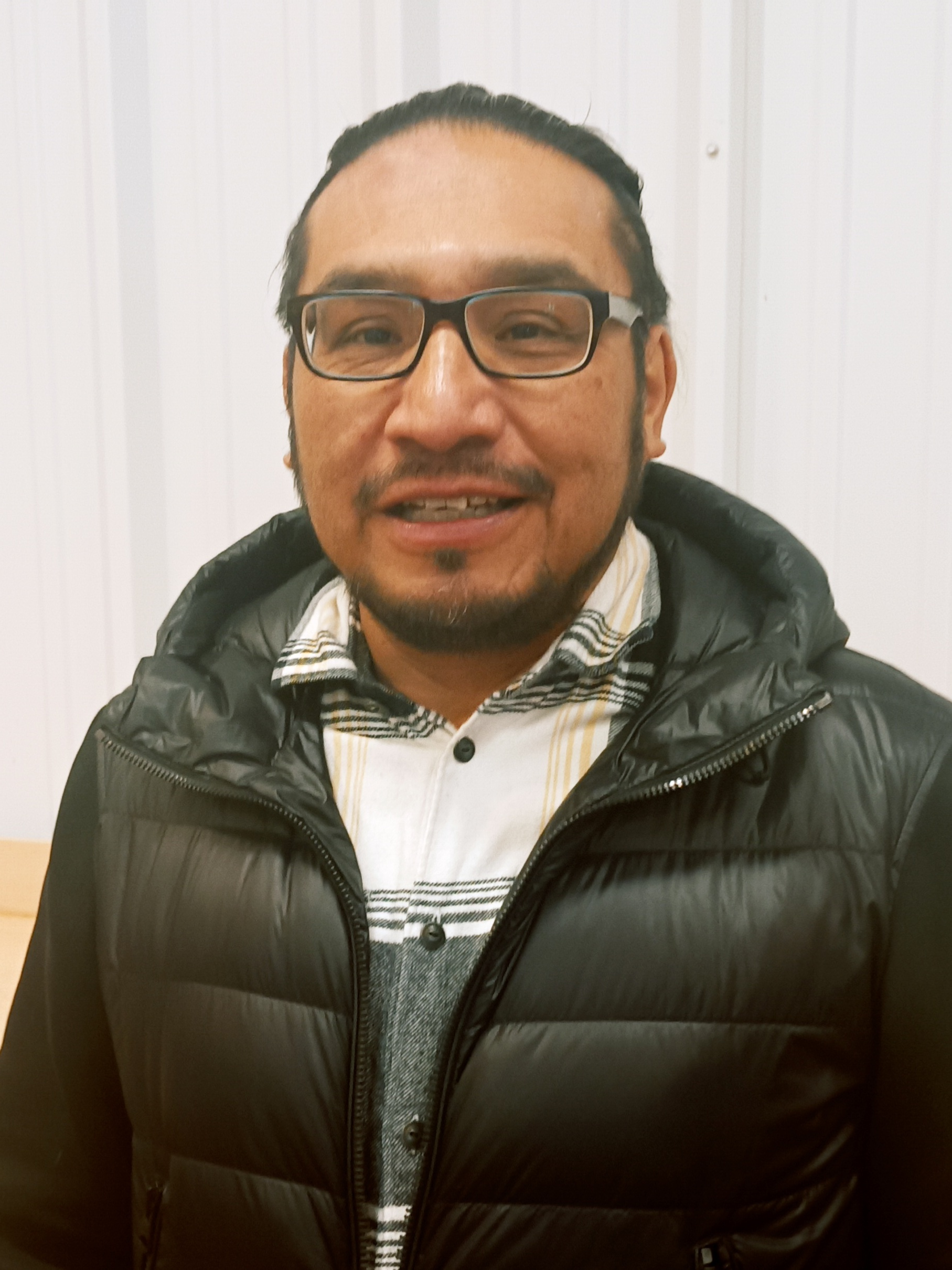
- Mamakwa in 2025

Deputy Leader of the Ontario New Democratic Party
- Incumbent
- Assumed office July 13, 2022 Serving with Doly Begum (2022–2026)
- Leader: Peter Tabuns (interim); Marit Stiles
- Preceded by: John Vanthof and Sara Singh

Critic, Indigenous and Treaty Relations; and Northern Development
- Incumbent
- Assumed office July 13, 2022

Critic, Indigenous Relations and Reconciliation
- In office August 23, 2018 – June 2, 2022

Member of the Ontario Provincial Parliament for Kiiwetinoong
- Incumbent
- Assumed office June 7, 2018
- Preceded by: Riding established

Personal details
- Born: Solomon Mamakwa; 1970 or 1971 (age 55–56) Sioux Lookout, Ontario, Canada
- Party: Ontario New Democratic

Solomon "Sol" Mamakwa (/ˈmɑːməˌkwɑː/ MA-mə-KWA, Oji-Cree: ᓴᐧᓬ ᒣᒣᑫᐧ; born 1970 or 1971) is a Canadian politician who has been the deputy leader of the Ontario New Democratic Party (ONDP) since 2022. Mamakwa was elected to the Legislative Assembly of Ontario in 2018 and serves as the Member of Provincial Parliament (MPP) for Kiiwetinoong. He is currently a member and the first vice-chair of the Standing Committee on the Interior, as well as the critic for Indigenous and Treaty Relations, and Northern Economic Development and Growth.

Born in Sioux Lookout and raised in Kingfisher Lake First Nation, he is among the first to be born and raised in a first nation to be elected to the Legislative Assembly of Ontario, and the first member to address the chamber in a language that is not English or French, speaking in Oji-Cree. He has introduced bills on making Ontario's laws follow the Declaration on the Rights of Indigenous Peoples, and making National Day for Truth and Reconciliation a statutory holiday in Ontario.

== Early life and career ==
Mamakwa was born to Jerry and Kezia Mamakwa at the Sioux Lookout Indian Hospital, one of two hospitals in the city before 1997 as a part of the racially-segregated Indian hospitals. He grew up in Kingfisher Lake First Nation, spending spring and fall with his parents hunting, where he learned Oji-Cree as his first language. While at Kingfisher Lake First Nation, he attended an Indian day school. At thirteen, he was sent to the Stirland Lake Residential School north of Pickle Lake, as the Kingfisher Lake First Nation had no on-site high school. He left the residential school system at fifteen, moving to Sioux Lookout while attending and graduating from Queen Elizabeth District High School.

Following high school, he returned to Kingfisher Lake First Nation for a couple years before attending post-secondary schooling to study public administration. He worked as an education director for the Kingfisher Lake First Nation, helping develop immersion programs for kids to be taught exclusive in Oji-Cree until grade three. He later worked on the Shibogama First Nations Council for education. In the mid-2000's, he changed his career focus from education to healthcare, becoming the health director on the Shibogama First Nations Council. Prior to being elected, he worked as the health system transformation lead for the Nishnawbe Aski Nation, and as a board member for the Sioux Lookout First Nations Health Authority.

== Political career ==
Mamakwa's political career began in 2018 when he was asked by the Ontario Liberal Party to run in the newly created Kiiwetinoong riding for the 2018 Ontario general election. After he spent two weeks deliberating on the decision, the Ontario Liberal Party went ahead and selected Sioux Lookout mayor Doug Lawrance as their candidate. As a part of election preparations, he focused his platform on healthcare in his riding. He won the riding with 3,232 votes, accounting for 49.9% of all votes in the riding. He became the second person to be born and raised in a first nation to be elected to the Legislative Assembly of Ontario, and one of three members of provincial parliament of Indigenous heritage to be elected in 2018, along with ONDP colleagues Suze Morrison and Guy Bourgouin. Following the election, he was named as the critic for Indigenous Relations and Reconciliation, officially starting his role on August 23, 2018. He also became a member of the Standing Committee on Finance and Economic Affairs, starting his term on July 26, 2018.

On March 6, 2019, Mamakwa introduced a private member's bill for the Ontario government to ensure that all of the laws in the province were consistent with the United Nations' Declaration on the Rights of Indigenous Peoples. While said it was unlikely to pass by the media, Indigenous experts said it puts Doug Ford's government in an awkward position with Indigenous people. The bill ended up making it through the second reading before being referred to the Standing Committee on General Government, where it stalled. A related federal bill, the United Nations Declaration on the Rights of Indigenous Peoples Act was put into effect on June 21, 2021.

During the March 11, 2021 session of the Legislative Assembly of Ontario, the Premier of Ontario Doug Ford accused Mamakwa of jumping the queue for vaccines during the COVID-19 pandemic after he was asked by the ONDP leadership to receive the vaccine. Following public outcry, Ford apologized the day after, personally calling him. He held a press conference later in the day, saying that "[he] appreciated his call, [but] it's not me he needs to apologize to, it's Indigenous people across Ontario". Shortly after, he announced he was running for a second term in the Kiiwetinoong riding.

Running for a second term in Kiiwetinoong in the 2022 Ontario general election, he won with 2,742 votes, accounting for 57.57% of the riding. Following the election on July 13, 2022, he was named one of two deputy leaders of the Ontario New Democratic Party, working alongside Scarborough Southwest MPP Doly Begum. His stint as the critic for Indigenous and Treaty Relations continued throughout 2022, and was also named the critic for Northern Development by interim ONDP leader Peter Tabuns. On August 10 and 17, he was named a member and vice-chair of the Standing Committee on Justice Policy respectively.

On May 28, 2024, Mamakwa made history during a session at the Legislative Assembly of Ontario by becoming the first legislator to speak in a language that was not English or French, speaking Oji-Cree. He spoke for ten minutes, receiving a pledge from Premier Ford for a long-term care home to be built in Sioux Lookout. This occurred after a decision by the government house leader, Paul Calandra, that Members of Provincial Parliament were allowed to use an "Indigenous language spoke in Canada". Later that year, he planned to introduce legislation that made the National Day for Truth and Reconciliation a provincial statutory holiday. The bill was later introduced on November 6 as the Day of Reflection for Indian Residential Schools Act, which did not pass on second reading after not receiving enough votes.

He was nominated as Member of Provincial Parliament for his third term in the Kiiwetinoong riding for the 2025 Ontario general election on January 14, 2025. On April 29 and May 5, he was named a member and first vice-chair of the Standing Committee of the Interior respectively. During the June 2 session of the Legislative Assembly of Ontario, Mamakwa was removed from the house by Speaker Donna Skelly following his comments accusing Premier Ford of "telling untruths to First Nations" about Bill 5, the Protect Ontario by Unleashing Our Economy Act. Skelly asked him to retract his comments repeatedly, with Mamakwa refusing each time, leading to his expulsion from the house. In the 2025 Ontario general election, he won his third team with 3,512 votes, accounting for 62.19% of all votes in the riding.

== Personal life ==
He has a brother, Jonathan, and a nephew, Kevin, who died in custody at the Thunder Bay Jail on June 2, 2020. The inquest into his death was set for January 27, 2026, but was delayed after Kevin's spouse died on the Sunday prior to the inquest. His spouse, Pearl, died in 2025.

== Electoral record ==
2025 Ontario general election: Kiiwetinoong
Party	Candidate	Votes	%	±%	Expenditures
New Democratic	Sol Mamakwa	3,512	62.19	+4.62	$34,971
Progressive Conservative	Waylon Scott	1,438	25.46	–4.47	$13,312
Liberal	Manuela Michelizzi	409	7.24	+1.34	$0
Green	Carolyn Spicer	152	2.69	–0.63	$4,593
Northern Ontario Heritage	Theresa Leppich	136	2.41	–	$0
Total valid votes/expense limit		5,647	98.45	–	$45,907
Total rejected, unmarked and declined ballots		89	1.55	+0.82	
Turnout		5,736	27.00	–3.40	
Eligible voters		21,245			
New Democratic hold		Swing		+4.55	
Source: Elections Ontario

2022 Ontario general election: Kiiwetinoong
Party	Candidate	Votes	%	±%	Expenditures
New Democratic	Sol Mamakwa	2,742	57.57	+7.67	$28,237
Progressive Conservative	Dwight Monck	1,426	29.94	+2.69	$14,030
Liberal	Manuela Michelizzi	281	5.90	–9.28	$0
Green	Suzette A. Foster	158	3.32	–2.95	$4,216
New Blue	Alex Dornn	156	3.28	–	$0
Total valid votes/expense limit		4,763	99.27	–	$32,252
Total rejected, unmarked and declined ballots		35	0.73	–0.55	
Turnout		4,798	30.40	–15.40	
Eligible voters		15,782			
New Democratic hold		Swing		+2.49	
Source: Elections Ontario

2018 Ontario general election: Kiiwetinoong
Party	Candidate	Votes	%	±%	Expenditures
New Democratic	Sol Mamakwa	3,232	49.90	–15.60	$17,963
Progressive Conservative	Clifford Bull	1,765	27.25	+15.22	$46,104
Liberal	Doug Lawrance	983	15.18	–3.56	$28,390
Green	Christine Penner Polle	406	6.27	+2.53	$269
Northern Ontario Heritage	Kenneth Jones	91	1.40	–	$0
Total valid votes/expense limit		6,477	98.72		
Total rejected, unmarked and declined ballots		84	1.28		
Turnout		6,561	45.80		
Eligible voters		14,326			
New Democratic notional hold		Swing		–15.41	
Source: Elections Ontario
