= Oakridge, Toronto =

Oakridge
- Neighbourhood
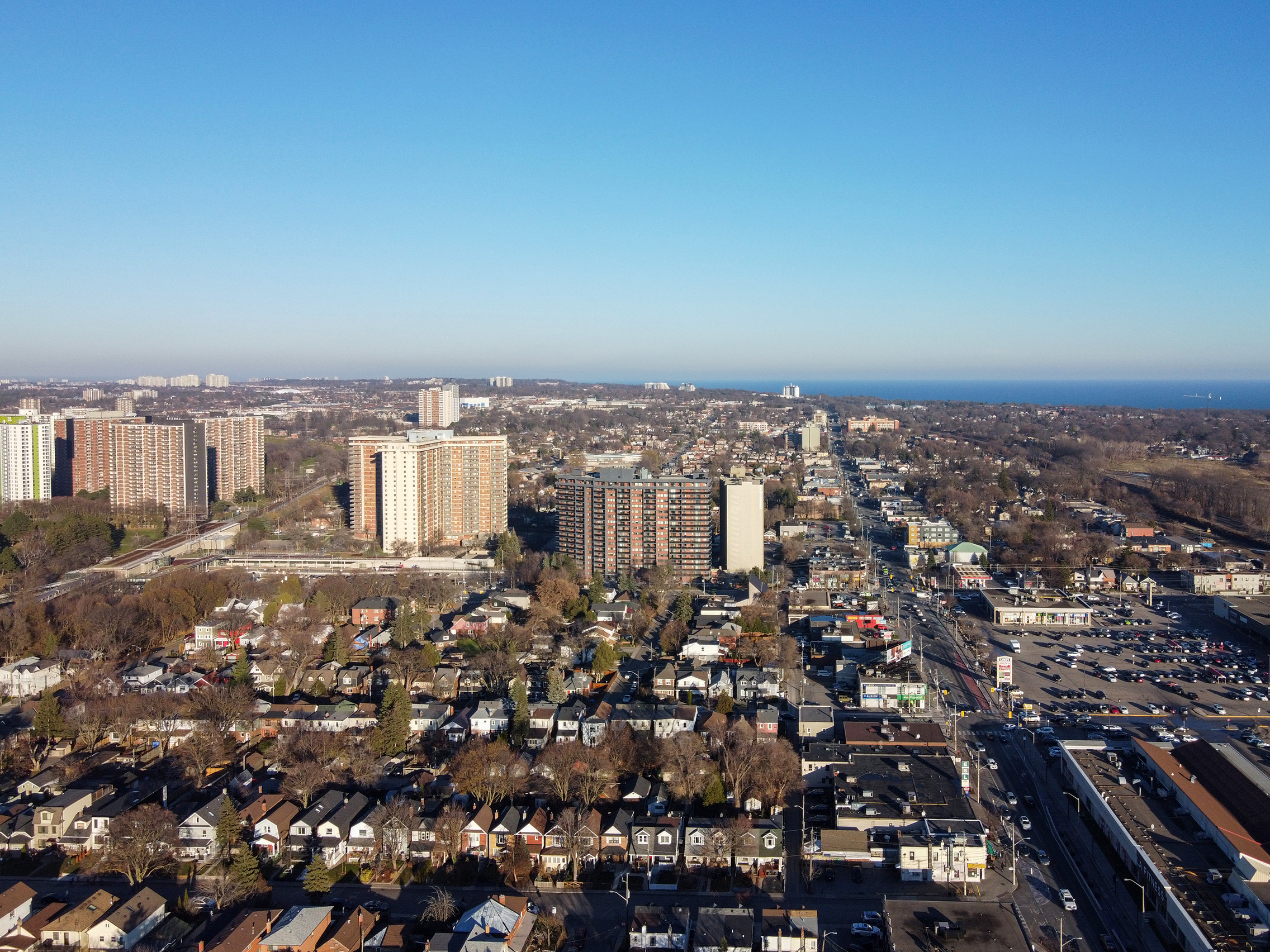
- Oakridge aerial view in 2022

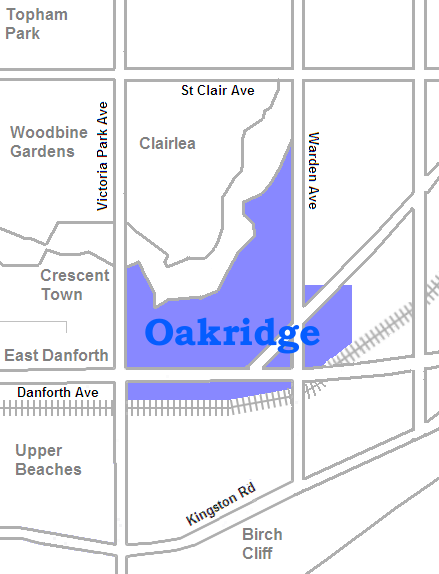
- Vicinity

- Location within Toronto
- Coordinates: 43°41′44″N 79°16′33″W
- Country: Canada
- Province: Ontario
- City: Toronto
- Established: 1850 Scarborough Township
- Changed municipality: 1998 Toronto from City of Scarborough

Government
  - MP: Bill Blair (Scarborough Southwest)
  - MPP: Doly Begum (Scarborough Southwest)
  - Councillor: Vacant (Ward 20 Scarborough Southwest)

Oakridge is a neighbourhood in the city of Toronto, Canada, in the Scarborough district. The community neighbours Birch Cliff to the south, Danforth Village to the east and Cliffside to the west edging onto the Scarborough Bluffs. The neighbourhood is bordered by Victoria Park Avenue to the west, Massey Creek to the north, and Warden Avenue to the east travelling south until Mack Avenue which then extends east again to the CNR rail line which forms the southern border.

== Description ==
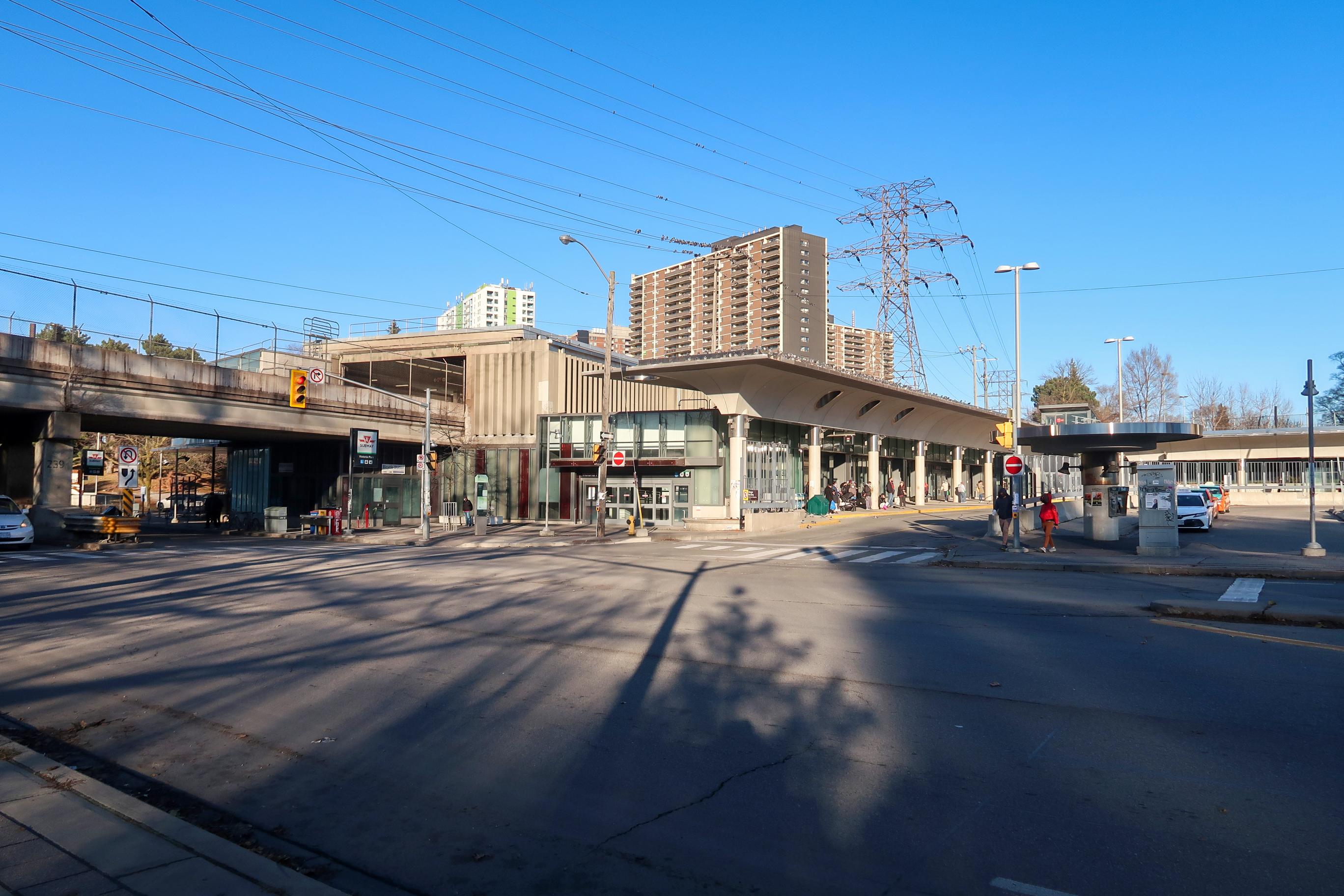
Victoria Park, one of two subway stations located in Oakridge

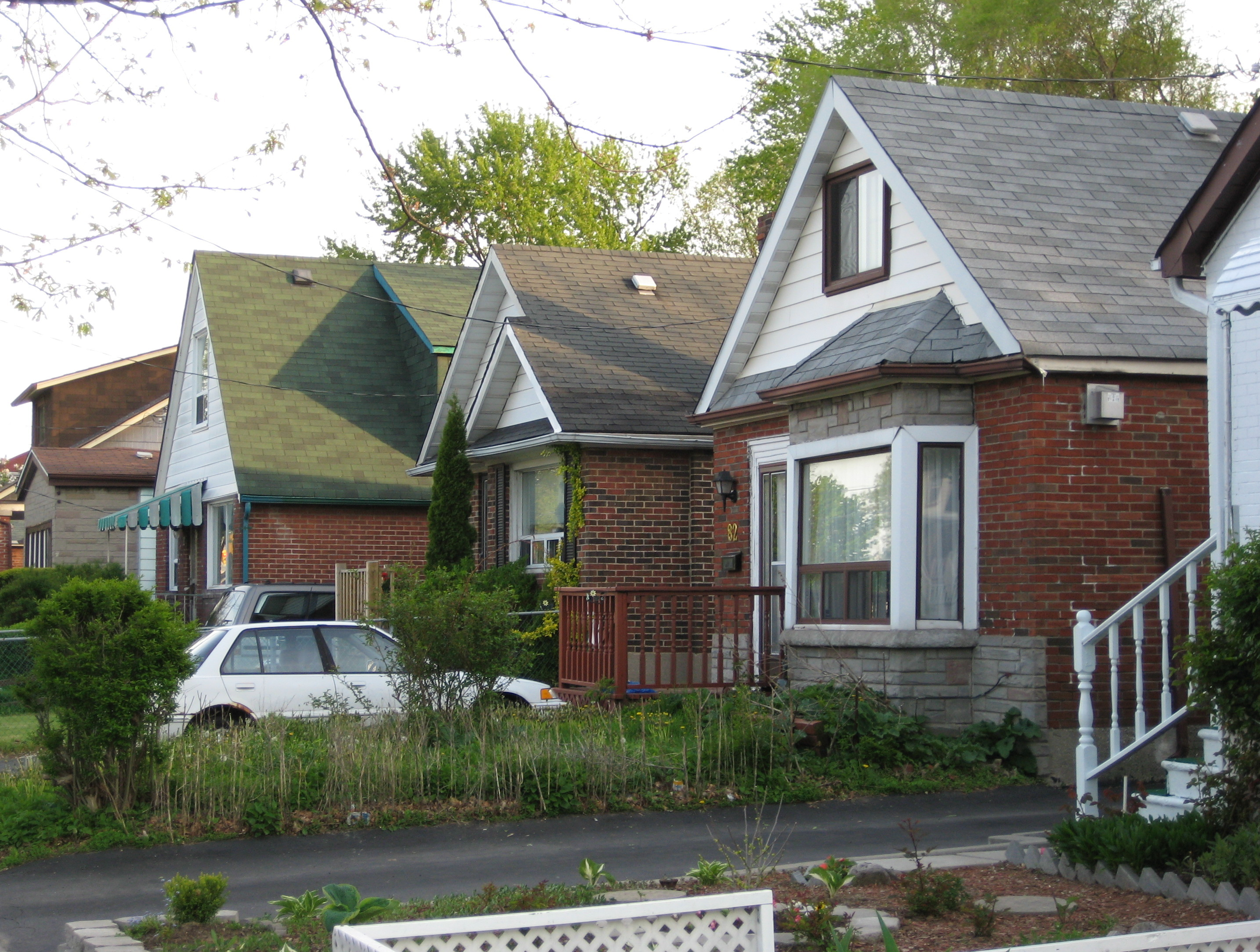
Houses in Oakridge

Oakridge is traditionally an immigrant, working class neighbourhood, Oakridge is experiencing the very beginning phase of rapid gentrification and was featured in Toronto's Neighbourhood to Watch 2018. The racial make up of Oakridge is diverse with many ethnicities and religions. More than 50% of residents were born outside of Canada, and consists of Black, South Asian, and East Asian people. Over 51% of residents are of Christian faith and 20% are of Muslim faith. The share of population by language spoken at home is 53% English where Bengali, Urdu and Tamil are over 20% and the remaining identify as English-Non Official or other.

The residential landscape within Oakridge dates from the Edwardian era, but the majority of homes were built during the interwar period and after World War II. Toronto council classified Oakridge as a neighbourhood improvement area in 2014, after it was assessed as having the lowest "neighbourhood equity score" in Scarborough and one of lowest in the city. The score is based on 15 criteria.

Oakridge's Business Improvement Area is represented by Crossroads of the Danforth. The BIA and merchants organize and operate year-round, admission-free festivals, charity dinners, and dances, including Wheels on the Danforth. The merchants of Crossroads of the Danforth are composed of volunteers from the business community, who work to promote growth and a strong neighbourhood identity.

The section of the Danforth running through Oakridge offers shopping, dining, automotive retail, community centres and other entertainment. Being a 25 minutes commute into Downtown Toronto, the neighbourhood has two subway stations on Warden and Victoria Park, providing easy access to the City Centre or Central Scarborough.

The neighbourhood will soon host a Long & McQuade and several new apartment developments along Danforth Avenue.

== See also ==
- List of neighbourhoods in Toronto
