= Kiiwetinoong =

Provincial electoral district in Ontario, Canada

Coordinates: 52.5°N 90.2°W

Ontario electoral district
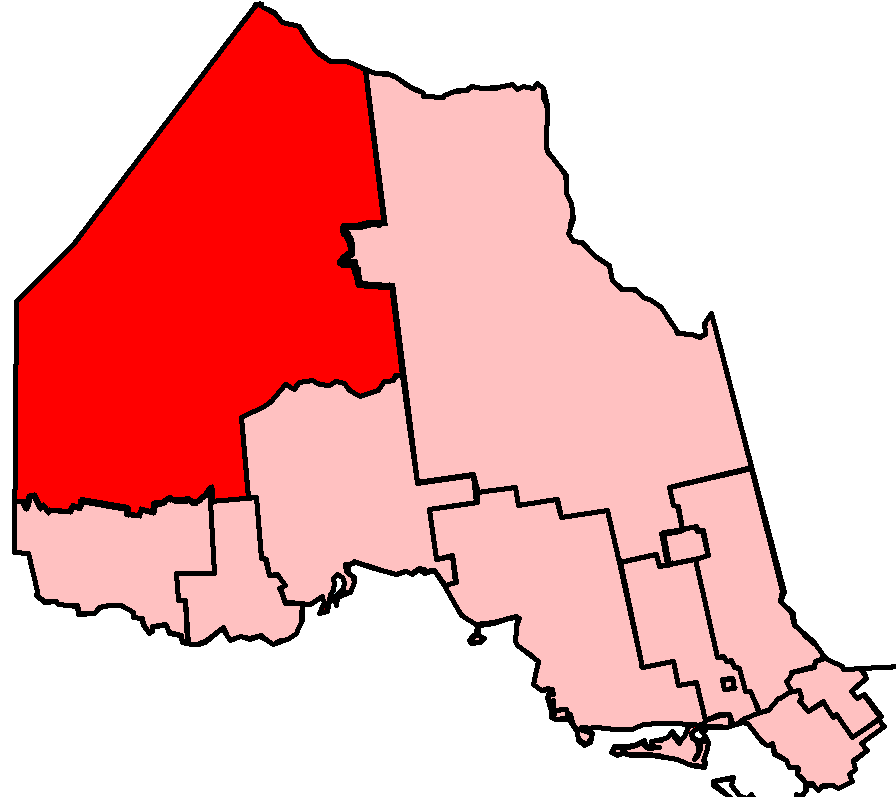

Provincial electoral district
- Legislature: Legislative Assembly of Ontario
MPP
Sol Mamakwa
New Democratic
- District created: 2017
- First contested: 2018
- Last contested: 2025

Demographics
- Population (2016): 32,987
- Electors (2018): 14,326
- Area (km²): 294,083
- Pop. density (per km²): 0.11
- Census division(s): Kenora District, Thunder Bay District
- Census subdivision: Sioux Lookout

Kiiwetinoong (/kɪˈwɛtɪnɒŋ/, Oji-Cree: ᑭᐍᑎᓄᐣᐠ) is a provincial electoral district (riding) in Ontario, Canada, which elects one member to the Legislative Assembly of Ontario. This riding was created prior to the 42nd Ontario general election from the northern portion of Kenora—Rainy River on the advice of the Far North Electoral Boundaries Commission in 2017. The Legislative Assembly of Ontario approved the new riding on October 24, 2017.

Kiiwetinoong is 68 percent Indigenous, the only riding in Ontario with a majority Indigenous population. The riding name means "North" in Ojibwe.

Kiiwetinoong, with a population of 32,987, is significantly smaller than the average Ontario district (with a population of 110,000) or the average Northern Ontario district (with a population of 76,000). Josh Dehaas, a National Post columnist, has criticized the new riding as violating the principle of representation by population.

== Members of Provincial Parliament ==
Kiiwetinoong
Assembly	Years	Member	Party
Riding created from Kenora—Rainy River
42nd	2018–2022	Sol Mamakwa	New Democratic
43rd	2022–2025	Sol Mamakwa	New Democratic
44th	2025–present	Sol Mamakwa	New Democratic

== Election results ==
Winning party in each polling division of Kiiwetinoong at the 2025 Ontario general election

2025 Ontario general election
Party	Candidate	Votes	%	±%	Expenditures
New Democratic	Sol Mamakwa	3,512	62.19	+4.62	$34,971
Progressive Conservative	Waylon Scott	1,438	25.46	–4.48	$13,312
Liberal	Manuela Michelizzi	409	7.24	+1.34	$0
Green	Carolyn Spicer	152	2.69	–0.63	$4,593
Northern Ontario	Theresa Leppich	136	2.41	N/A	$0
Total valid votes/expense limit		5,647	98.45	–0.82	$45,907
Total rejected, unmarked, and declined ballots		89	1.55	+0.82	
Turnout		5,736	27.65	–2.75	
Eligible voters		20,746			
New Democratic hold		Swing		+4.55	
Source: Elections Ontario

Winning party in each polling division of Kiiwetinoong at the 2022 Ontario general election

2022 Ontario general election
Party	Candidate	Votes	%	±%	Expenditures
New Democratic	Sol Mamakwa	2,742	57.57	+7.67	$28,237
Progressive Conservative	Dwight Monck	1,426	29.94	+2.69	$14,030
Liberal	Manuela Michelizzi	281	5.90	−9.28	$0
Green	Suzette A. Foster	158	3.32	−2.95	$4,216
New Blue	Alex Dornn	156	3.28		$0
Total valid votes/expense limit		4,763	99.27	+0.55	$32,252
Total rejected, unmarked, and declined ballots		35	0.73	-0.55	
Turnout		4,798	30.40	-15.40	
Eligible voters		15,775			
New Democratic hold		Swing		+2.49	
Source(s): "Summary of Valid Votes Cast for Each Candidate" (PDF). Elections Ontario. 2022. Archived from the original on May 18, 2023.; "Statistical Summary by Electoral District" (PDF). Elections Ontario. 2022. Archived from the original on May 21, 2023.

2018 Ontario general election
Party	Candidate	Votes	%	±%	Expenditures
New Democratic	Sol Mamakwa	3,232	49.90	–15.60	$17,963
Progressive Conservative	Clifford Bull	1,765	27.25	+15.22	$46,104
Liberal	Doug Lawrance	983	15.18	–3.56	$28,390
Green	Christine Penner Polle	406	6.27	+2.53	$269
Northern Ontario	Kenneth Jones	91	1.40	N/A	$0
Total valid votes		6,477	98.72		
Total rejected, unmarked and declined ballots		84	1.28		
Turnout		6,561	45.80		
Eligible voters		14,326			
New Democratic notional hold		Swing		–15.41	
Source: Elections Ontario

2014 general election redistributed results
Party	Vote	%
New Democratic	3,479	65.50
Liberal	995	18.74
Progressive Conservative	639	12.03
Green	198	3.74

== See also ==
- List of Ontario provincial electoral districts
- Canadian provincial electoral districts
