= Cliffcrest =

- Neighbourhood
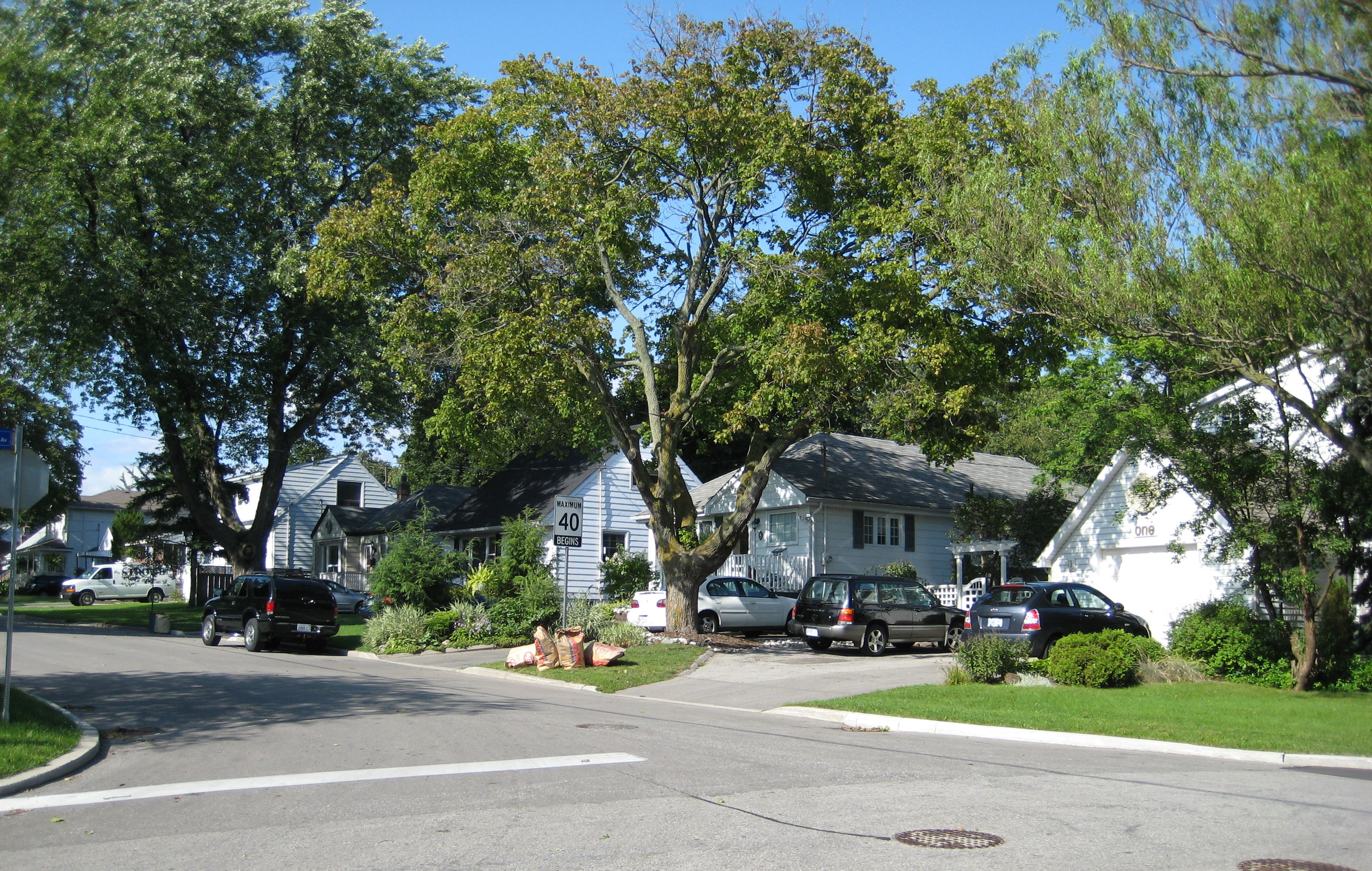
- Residences at Cliffcrest

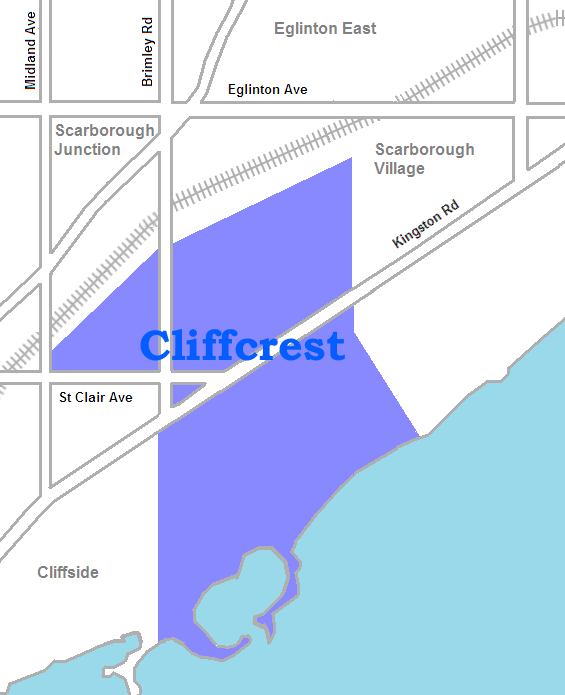
- Vicinity

- Location within Toronto
- Coordinates: 43.722°N 79.231°W
- Country: Canada
- Province: Ontario
- City: Toronto
- Established municipality: 1850 Scarborough Township
- Changed municipality: 1998 Toronto from City of Scarborough

Government
  - MP: Bill Blair (Scarborough Southwest)
  - MPP: Doly Begum (Scarborough Southwest)
  - Councillor: Parthi Kandavel (Ward 20 Scarborough Southwest)

Cliffcrest is a residential neighborhood in Toronto, Ontario, Canada. It is located along the shores of Lake Ontario in the district of Scarborough, bordered by Midland Avenue to the west, the Canadian National Railway to the north, and Bellamy Road to the east.

The name Cliffcrest is in reference to the Scarborough Bluffs, which are sandy cliffs along the lake's edge. The neighborhood feels much more like being at a cottage than being in Canada's largest and most densely populated city. For the smaller cottage-like homes, the average value is only middle of the pack, making it affordable by Toronto standards. Most homes are single, detached houses with a high ownership rate. There are fewer high or mid rise buildings in the area.

== Education ==
Two public school boards operate schools in Cliffcrest, the secular Toronto District School Board (TDSB), and the separate Toronto Catholic District School Board. The French first language public secular school board, Conseil scolaire Viamonde, and it separate counterpart, Conseil scolaire catholique MonAvenir also offer schooling to applicable residents of Cliffcrest, although they do not operate a school in the neighbourhood.

TDSB is the only school board that operates a public secondary school in the neighbourhood, R. H. King Academy, one of the oldest high schools in the former city of Scarborough. The school began in 1922 as Scarborough High School with 116 students using the Birch Cliff Congregation Church before the Collegiate Gothic building on St. Clair opened that same year. The school became Scarborough Collegiate Institute in 1930 and became R. H. King Collegiate Institute, named after the founding principal of that school, in 1954. In 1975, the western section was erected to replace the 1922 building, which has been reduced to an entrance arch and boiler room. King was designated as an "academy" starting in September 1989.

The TDSB also operates four elementary schools in the neighbourhood, Anson Park Public School, Bliss Carman Senior Public School, Fairmount Public School, and H. A. Halbert Junior Public School.

TCDSB operates one public elementary school in the neighbourhood, St. Agatha Catholic School.

== Recreation ==
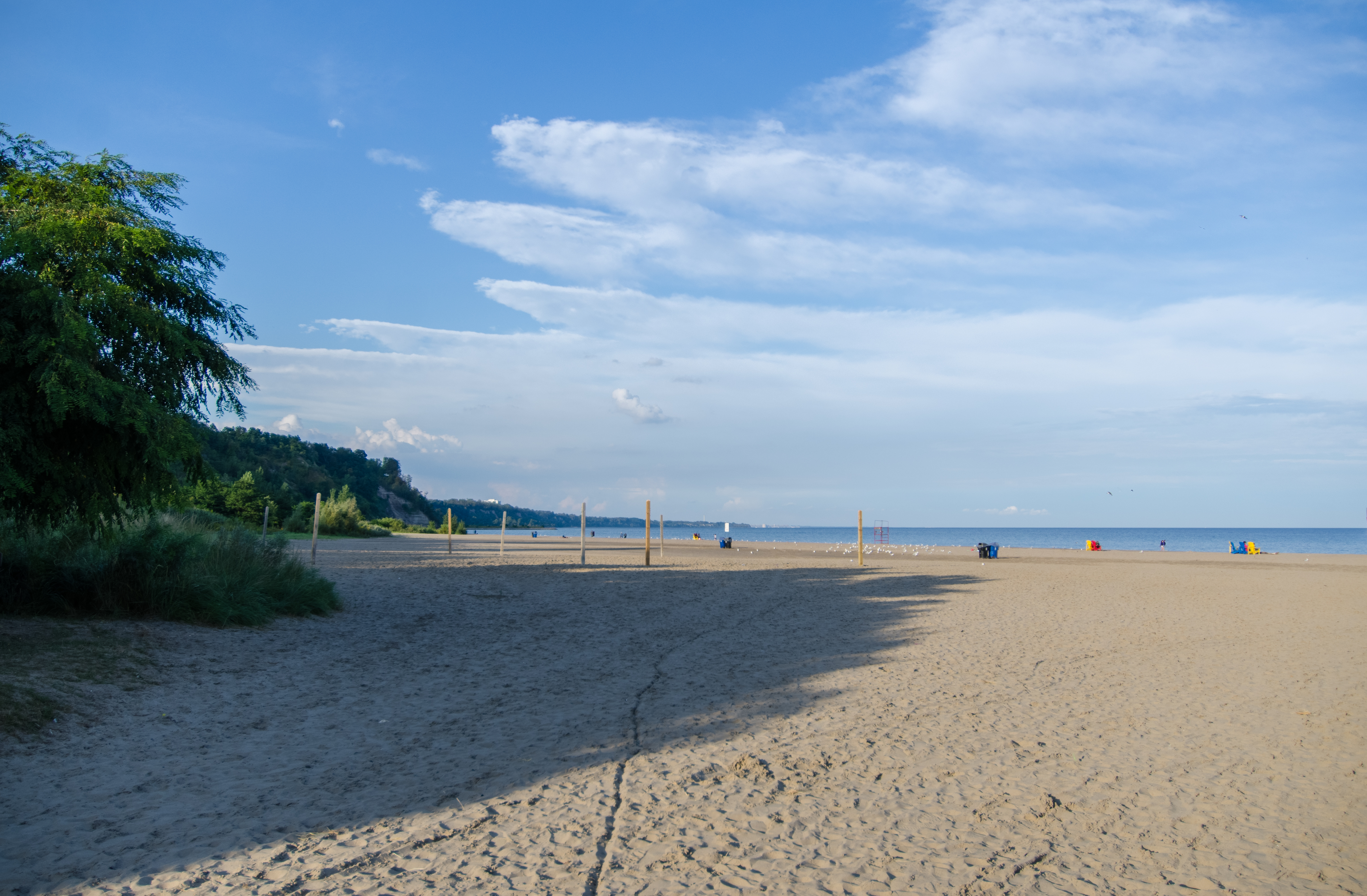
Bluffer's Beach is a beach located at the southern end of Cliffcrest.

Several parks are located in Cliffcrest, many of which are situated near Scarborough Bluffs and the waterfront. Municipal parks in the neighbourhood include Cudia Park, McCowan District Park, and portions of Bluffer's Park, including Bluffer's Park Yacht Club, and Bluffer's Beach. Municipal parks in Cliffcrest are maintained by Toronto Parks, Forestry and Recreation Division.

The Cliffcrest branch of the Toronto Public Library is also located in the neighbourhood, situated on Kingston Road.
