= Filipino Heritage Month =

Canadian month-long celebration

- Observed by: Filipino Canadians
- Date: June
- Duration: 30 days
- Frequency: Annual

Filipino Heritage Month is a month-long celebration in Canada that takes place every June. The work for the declaration of Filipino Heritage Month was started by Paulina Corpuz of Toronto, Ontario, through a petition. Through the sponsorship of Councillor Neethan Shan, a motion was submitted at the City of Toronto Council and with the endorsement of about 50 people and organizations, the motion was approved by the council unanimously. It was finally declared in Canada on October 30, 2018, Motion M-155, through the authorship of MP Salma Zahid, Liberal MP, Scarborough Centre.

== History ==
The work to declare June as a Filipino Heritage Month started in November 2016. Paulina Corpuz, Toronto-based community leader and President of the Philippine Advancement Through Arts and Culture (PATAC), first raised this idea with Ontario New Democratic Party Members of Provincial Parliament (MPPs). With the help of Laura Casselman, Corpuz met with the NDP MPP and was advised to submit a petition through the OLA process. Signatures were gathered at various community events held from June 2016 until August 2017.

In October 2017, Corpuz attended a Filipino Workers consultation organized by Neethan Shan, a Toronto City Councillor (Ward 42, Scarborough Rouge River). In that consultation, Shan offered to sponsor a motion to declare the month of June as Filipino Heritage Month, at the Toronto City Council. A Filipino Heritage Month motion was introduced by Councillor Neethan Shan, in November 2017 with the help of Corpuz who had started the petition in November 2016, gathered endorsements from 50 individuals and organizations. The City council passed the motion unanimously.

As a result of the motion passed at the City of Toronto, the provincial government of Ontario and the federal government of Canada took notice.

Several days after the passing, MPP Raymond Cho of the Progressive Conservative presented a motion to declare June as Filipino Heritage Month. This was defeated. Recognizing the importance of the Filipino Canadian community but not willing to work together, the three political parties forwarded their own members' bill version to declare June as Filipino Heritage Month.

- New Democrats Party (NDP) by MPP Peter Tabuns, November 23, 2017
- Progressive Conservatives (PC) MPP Raymond Cho, Bill 185, December 5, 2017
- Liberal Party (LP) MPP Mike Colle, Bill 10, March 20, 2018

NDP MPP Doly Begum introduced a private member’s bill in the Ontario legislature to proclaim June as Filipino Heritage Month, which passed its final reading and received Royal Assent on May 20, 2021.

Liberal Party MP Salma Zahid of Scarborough Central also started a petition in British Columbia .

The first Filipino Heritage Month celebrations

Starting in 2018, Toronto celebrated Filipino Heritage Month, becoming Canada's first municipality to mark June as Filipino heritage month in perpetuity. Alberta was the first Canadian province to do so.

The Toronto Catholic District School Board also voted on May 17, 2018 to declare June 12th as Filipino Heritage Day and June as Filipino Heritage Month, across all Catholic elementary and secondary schools in Toronto. As of June 2018, there are 168 elementary schools, 31 secondary schools, and three combined (elementary and secondary) schools.

Montreal also named June as Filipino Heritage Month, by the local Côte-des-Neiges–Notre-Dame-de-Grâce Council in February 2018, introduced by Councilor Marvin Rotrand and Councilor Lionel Perez. which led to the formation of the Filipino Heritage Society of Montreal (FHSM). However, Calgary organization leaders petitioned for Philippine-Canadian Heritage Month, instead of Filipino Heritage Month, to be celebrated in September, conflicting with the Edmonton organization leaders' petition, a motion started by Marco Luciano, to celebrate Filipino Heritage Month in June.

On March 15, 2019, MP Salma Zahid led officials in launching Filipino Heritage Month in Canada in her federal riding of Scarborough Centre. The event kicked off the initial celebration, which will begin on June 1, 2019, the first commemoration across Canada. In the Greater Toronto Area, the June 1 festivities will be held at Albert Campbell Square in the eastern suburb of Scarborough.
