= Fatima Shaban =

Canadian politician

Fatima Shaban MPP

Member of the Ontario Provincial Parliament for Scarborough Southwest
- Incumbent
- Assumed office September 3, 2026
- Preceded by: Doly Begum

Personal details
- Party: Ontario New Democratic (provincial)
- Other political affiliations: New Democratic (federal)

Fatima Shaban is a Canadian politician who is the member of Provincial Parliament (MPP) for Scarborough Southwest. A member of the Ontario New Democratic Party (NDP), Shaban was elected in a September 2026 by-election. Shaban was the federal NDP candidate in Scarborough Southwest in the 2025 Canadian federal election, and again in the 2026 federal by-election following the resignation of Bill Blair.

== Personal life ==
Shaban was born in Canada to an Egyptian father and a Slovakian mother. Outside of politics, she is a community organizer; Shaban has been active in affordable housing advocacy and has served as treasurer of the Regent Heights Public School Council. She graduated with a degree in criminology and socio-legal studies.

== Electoral history ==
Ontario provincial by-election, September 3, 2026: Scarborough Southwest Resignation of Doly Begum to run in a federal by-election
Party	Candidate	Votes	%	±%
New Democratic	Fatima Shaban	8,914	40.47	-2.42
Liberal	Ahsanul Hafiz	6,674	30.30	+7.36
Progressive Conservative	Noor Tarun	5,148	23.37	-7.27
Green	Mark Bekkering	753	3.38	-0.14
Ontario Party	Gord Elliott	237	1.08	–
New Blue	Chris Rees	178	0.81	–
Independent	Michael Perdelwitz	129	0.59	–
Total valid votes		22,033	99.49	+0.18
Total rejected, unmarked, and declined ballots		113	0.51	-0.18
Turnout		22,146	26.65	-15.08
Eligible voters		83,115		
New Democratic hold		Swing		-4.89
Source: Elections Ontario

Canadian federal by-election, April 13, 2026: Scarborough Southwest Resignation of Bill Blair
Party	Candidate	Votes	%	±%
Liberal	Doly Begum	20,121	69.60	+8.12
Conservative	Diana Filipova	5,433	18.79	–11.77
New Democratic	Fatima Shaban	1,714	5.92	+0.92
Green	Pooja Malhotra	711	2.46	+1.08
Independent	April Francisco	422	1.50	N/A
People's	Peter Koubakis	265	0.92	-0.12
Christian Heritage	David Vedova	143	0.49	N/A
Centrist	Lyall Sanders	100	0.35	+0.04
Total valid votes		28,909		
Total rejected ballots		89		
Turnout		28,998	33.80	–29.52
Eligible voters		85,796		
Liberal hold		Swing		+8.12
Source: Elections Canada

2025 Canadian federal election: Scarborough Southwest
Party	Candidate	Votes	%	±%
Liberal	Bill Blair	33,495	61.49	+3.53
Conservative	Asm Tarun	16,652	30.57	+9.98
New Democratic	Fatima Shaban	2,730	5.01	–10.97
Green	Amanda Cain	754	1.38	–0.87
People's	Michael Poulin	567	1.04	–1.84
Centrist	Imran Khan	165	0.30	+0.28
Marxist–Leninist	Christine Nugent	113	0.21	N/A
Total valid votes		54,476	99.52	
Total rejected ballots		264	0.48	-0.28
Turnout		54,740	63.32	+6.14
Eligible voters		86,452		
Liberal notional hold		Swing		–3.22
Source: Elections Canada
