= 2026 Scarborough Southwest federal by-election =

By-election in Canada

- April 13, 2026

Riding of Scarborough Southwest
- Turnout: 33.80% (▼29.52 pp)
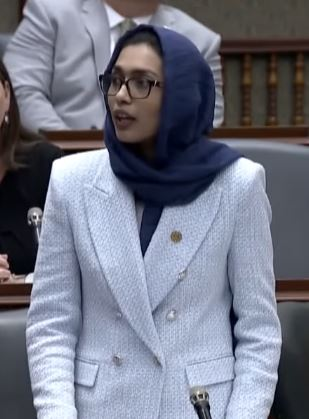
	First party	Second party	Third party
		CPC	NDP
Candidate	Doly Begum	Diana Filipova	Fatima Shaban
Party	Liberal	Conservative	New Democratic
Last election	61.49%	30.57%	5.01%
Popular vote	20,121	5,433	1,714
Percentage	69.60%	18.79%	5.93%
Swing	▲8.12 pp	▼11.77 pp	▲0.92 pp
- Poll by poll map of Scarborough Southwest in 2025 and 2026
MP before election
Bill Blair
Liberal
Elected MP
Doly Begum
Liberal

A by-election was held on April 13, 2026, to elect a member of Parliament (MP) to represent Scarborough Southwest, Ontario, in the House of Commons for the remainder of the 45th Parliament following the resignation of Liberal Party MP Bill Blair. The by-election was won by Doly Begum, the Liberal Party candidate.

== Background ==
=== Early speculation ===
In September 2025, The Globe and Mail reported that Prime Minister Mark Carney was considering appointing Blair to a senior diplomatic post, with sources indicating he was being considered for the role of Canada's High Commissioner to the United Kingdom. The report said the potential appointment was viewed as part of an effort to recognize former senior ministers and create opportunities to recruit new cabinet talent following the formation of Carney’s government.

The article noted that Blair, who had served as minister of national defence and minister of public safety, had not been included in Carney's new cabinet despite being regarded by sources as a competent minister. It also reported that his riding of Scarborough Southwest was considered a safe Liberal seat in the event a by-election were triggered by a diplomatic appointment.

In January 2026, CBC News reported that Blair was among former ministers expected to receive diplomatic appointments that would require them to vacate their seats, citing prior media reporting and statements from the prime minister indicating that multiple by-elections were anticipated.

Neither Blair nor his office provided public comment at the time of the reports, and no appointment timeline was announced.

=== Announcement ===
On February 2, 2026, Prime Minister Mark Carney announced that former cabinet minister Bill Blair would resign as member of Parliament for Scarborough Southwest to accept an appointment as Canada’s high commissioner to the United Kingdom. Blair previously served as the chief of the Toronto Police Service before being elected to the House of Commons in 2015, and later held cabinet positions including minister of public safety and minister of national defence.

Blair’s departure resulted in a vacancy in Scarborough Southwest and marked the second Toronto-area seat to be vacated in 2026, following Chrystia Freeland’s resignation earlier in the year. The appointment filled a diplomatic vacancy created by the conclusion of Ralph Goodale’s posting in London.

== Constituency ==
Scarborough Southwest is an urban riding in the southwestern part of Scarborough in Toronto, encompassing the area from Lake Ontario in the south to Eglinton Avenue East in the north, and from Victoria Park Avenue in the west to Markham Road in the east. It includes the neighbourhoods of Birch Cliff, Oakridge, Cliffside, Kennedy Park, Clairlea, and Cliffcrest, as well as parts of Scarborough Village and the Golden Mile.

== Timing ==
The Chief Electoral Officer received formal notification of the vacancy from the Speaker of the House of Commons on February 2, 2026. The date of the by-election had to be announced between February 13 and August 1, 2026. The by-election had to be held on a Monday, at least 36 days but no more than 50 days after the day the by-election is announced. Accordingly, the earliest date that the Scarborough Southwest by-election could have been held is March 23, 2026, and the latest is September 14, 2026. On March 8, 2026, the writ was issued for a by-election on April 13, 2026. Nominations closed on March 23.

== Candidates ==
=== Liberal Party ===
On February 3, 2026, the Liberal Party appointed Ontario Member of Provincial Parliament and Ontario New Democratic Party deputy leader Doly Begum as their candidate. She resigned from the Ontario NDP on the same day as well as her seat in the Ontario legislature. She was endorsed by former mayor of Toronto John Tory.

=== Conservative Party ===
The Conservatives announced middle school teacher Diana Filipova as their candidate on March 13, 2026.

=== New Democratic Party ===
Fatima Shaban, a community agency worker, who was the NDP's candidate in 2025, ran again.

=== Green Party ===
On January 21, Green Party Canada announced Pooja Malhotra as their candidate.

=== Other ===
The Centrist Party ran Lyall Sanders, a Métis teacher, local businessman, and longtime Toronto musician. In 2023, Lyall placed 12th in the Toronto mayoral by-election.

== Opinion polling ==
Polling firm	Last date of polling	Link	LPC	CPC	NDP	GPC	Others	Sample size	Lead
Mainstreet Research	February 22, 2026		57	22	15	1	5	464	35

== Result ==
Canadian federal by-election, April 13, 2026: Scarborough Southwest Resignation of Bill Blair
Party	Candidate	Votes	%	±%
Liberal	Doly Begum	20,121	69.60	+8.12
Conservative	Diana Filipova	5,433	18.79	–11.77
New Democratic	Fatima Shaban	1,714	5.92	+0.92
Green	Pooja Malhotra	711	2.46	+1.08
Independent	April Francisco	422	1.50	N/A
People's	Peter Koubakis	265	0.92	-0.12
Christian Heritage	David Vedova	143	0.49	N/A
Centrist	Lyall Sanders	100	0.35	+0.04
Total valid votes		28,909		
Total rejected ballots		89		
Turnout		28,998	33.80	–29.52
Eligible voters		85,796		
Liberal hold		Swing		+8.12
Source: Elections Canada

== Previous result ==
2025 Canadian federal election: Scarborough Southwest
Party	Candidate	Votes	%	±%
Liberal	Bill Blair	33,495	61.49	+3.53
Conservative	Asm Tarun	16,652	30.57	+9.98
New Democratic	Fatima Shaban	2,730	5.01	–10.97
Green	Amanda Cain	754	1.38	–0.87
People's	Michael Poulin	567	1.04	–1.84
Centrist	Imran Khan	165	0.30	+0.28
Marxist–Leninist	Christine Nugent	113	0.21	N/A
Total valid votes		54,476	99.52	
Total rejected ballots		264	0.48	-0.28
Turnout		54,740	63.32	+6.14
Eligible voters		86,452		
Liberal notional hold		Swing		–3.22
Source: Elections Canada

== See also ==
- By-elections to the 45th Canadian Parliament
