= Cliffside, Toronto =

Cliffside
- Neighbourhood
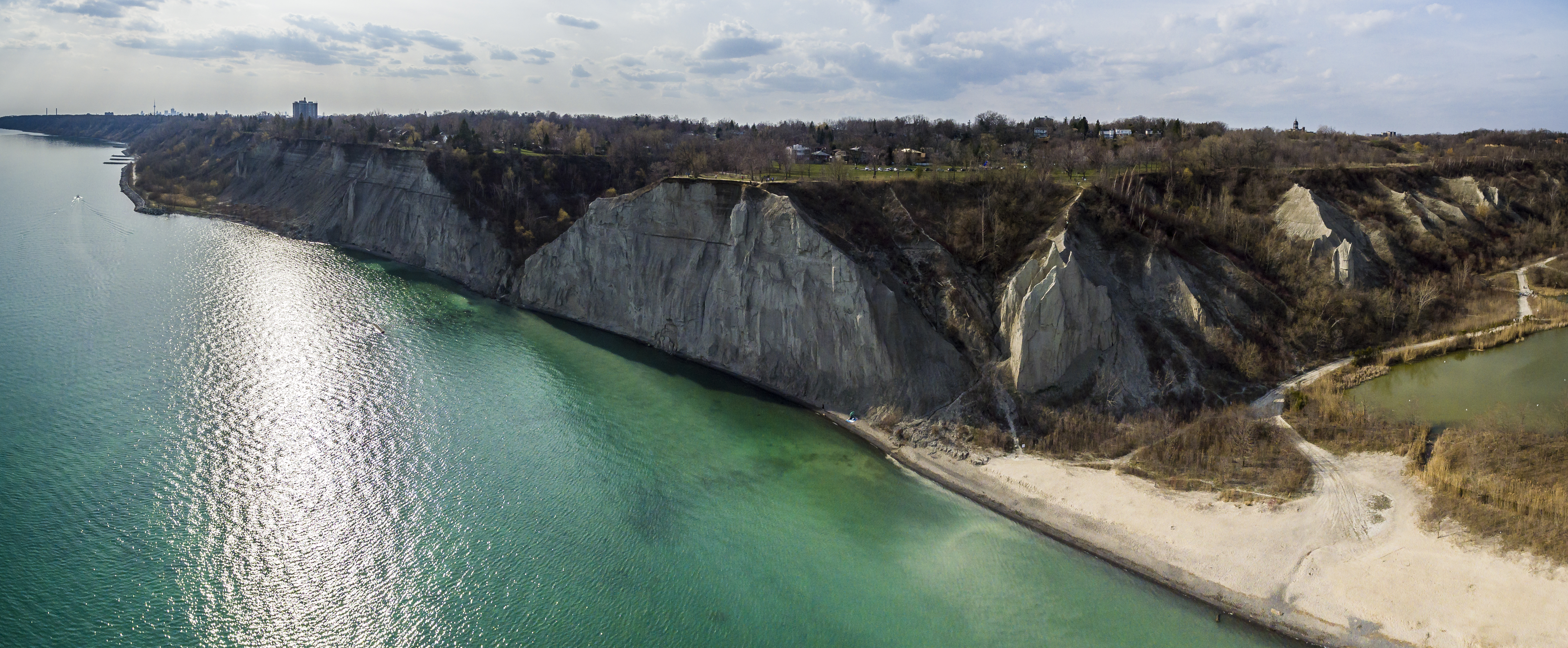
- View of Cliffside and the Scarborough Bluffs from the southeast at Bluffer's Park

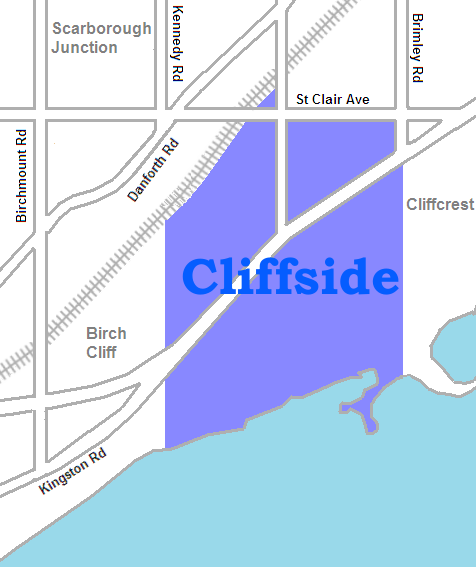
- Vicinity

- Location within Toronto
- Coordinates: 43°42′40″N 79°14′53″W
- Country: Canada
- Province: Ontario
- City: Toronto
- Established municipality: 1850 Scarborough Township
- Changed municipality: 1998 Toronto from City of Scarborough

Government
  - MP: Bill Blair (Scarborough Southwest)
  - MPP: Doly Begum (Scarborough Southwest)
  - Councillor: Vacant (Ward 20 Scarborough Southwest)

Cliffside is a neighbourhood in Toronto, Ontario, Canada, located along the Scarborough Bluffs in the district of Scarborough. Its boundaries are Kennedy Road to the west (where Kingston and Danforth Road merge), St. Clair Avenue East to the north, Brimley Road to the east, and the Bluffs on the lakeshore to the south.

== History ==
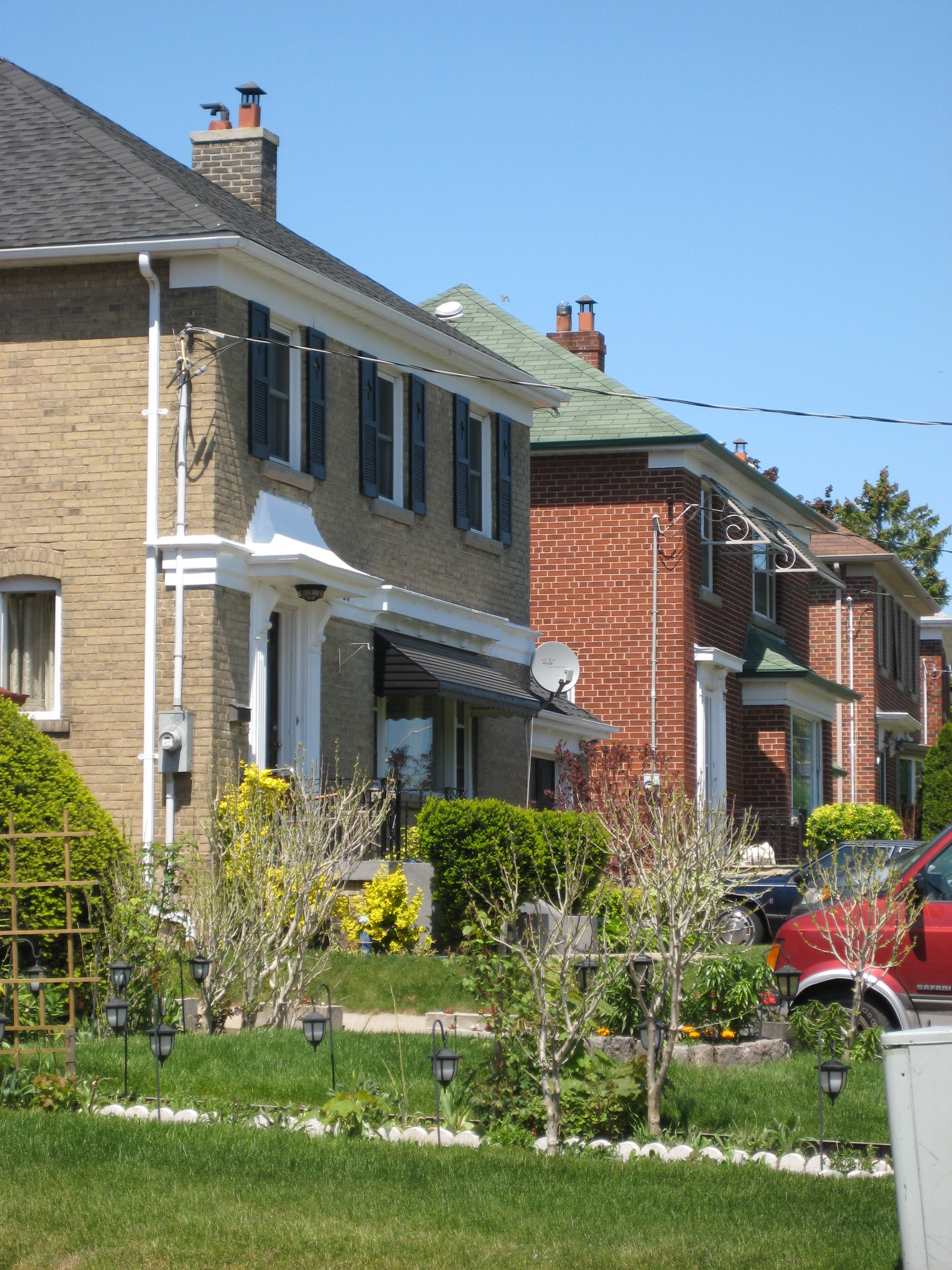
Cliffside was developed as a residential area in the 1950s.

Cliffside was developed as a modern large scale suburban housing subdivision in the early 1950s, during the post–World War II period with the baby boom, subdividing of farmland. The area south of Kingston Road was previously a golf course. Some homes were built prior to this period with the development of Birch Cliff to the west.

The population consists of a large number of those with ancestral backgrounds from the British Isles: English 19.8% Scottish 14.4% Irish 11.8%, totalling 46% (source: 2001 Census).

== Education ==
Two public school boards operate elementary schools in Cliffside, the secular Toronto District School Board, and the separate Toronto Catholic District School Board. Neither school board operates a secondary school in the neighbourhood, with students attending TCDSB or TDSB secondary schools in adjacent neighbourhoods.

The French first language public secular school board, Conseil scolaire Viamonde, and it separate counterpart, Conseil scolaire catholique MonAvenir also offer schooling to applicable residents of Cliffside, although they do not operate a school in the neighbourhood.

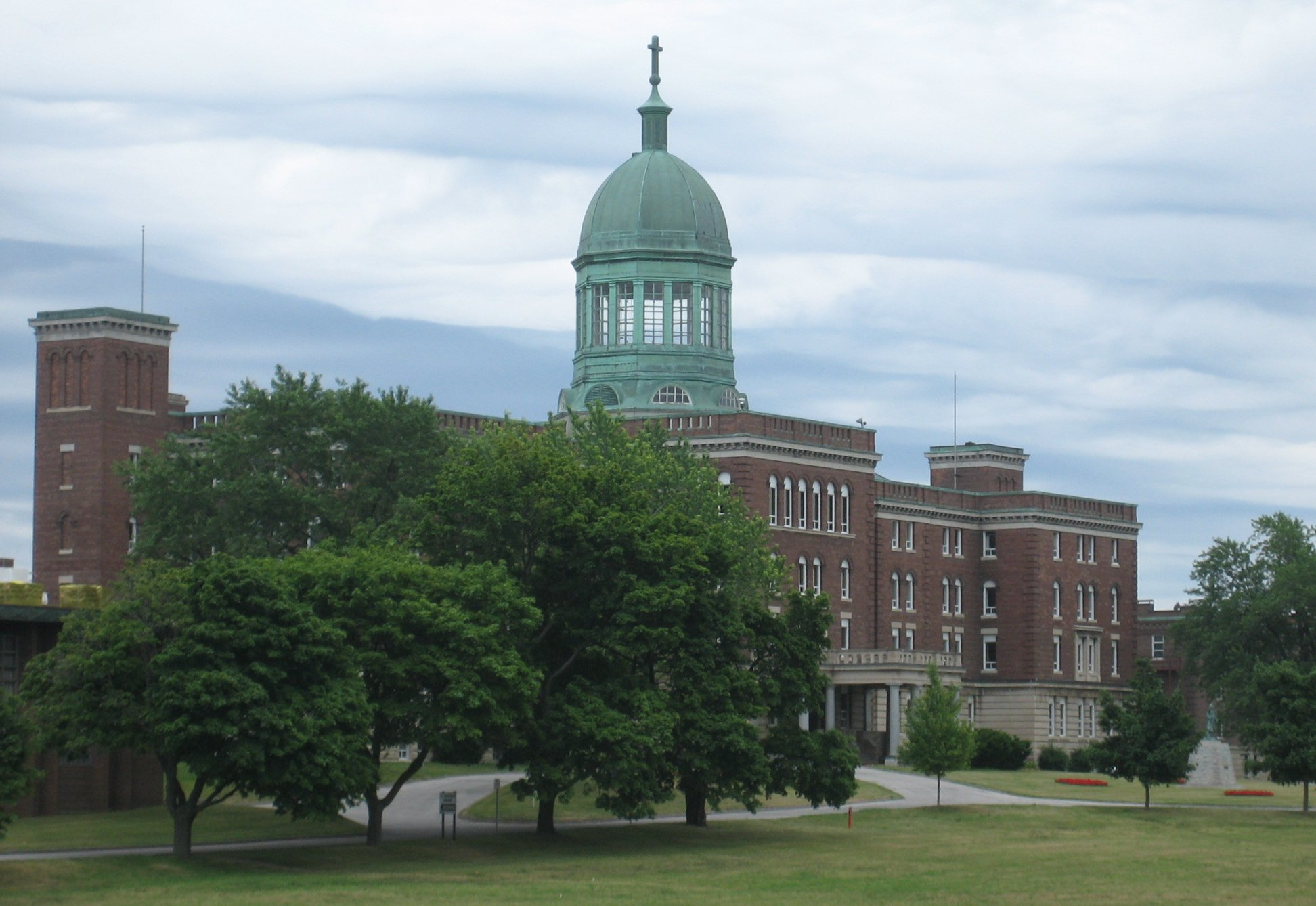
St. Augustine's Seminary is a post-secondary institution in Cliffside.

In addition to primary and secondary institutions, Cliffside is also home to an independent post-secondary Catholic seminary, St. Augustine's Seminary.

== Recreation ==
Cliffside is home to a number of parks, most of which are near the waterfront and the Scarborough Bluffs including Scarborough Crescent Park, Scarborough Heights Park, Midland Ravine Park, and the eastern portion of Bluffer's Park. Bluffers Park hosts a number of amenities including the Bluffer's Park Yacht Club.

Municipal parks in Cliffside are operated by the Toronto Parks, Forestry and Recreation Division.

== Transportation ==
Public transportation is provided by the Toronto Transit Commission's (TTC) bus system, with several routes operating through the neighbourhood. In addition to TTC bus routes, access to GO Transit commuter rail lines, Lakeshore East and Stouffville may be accessed from Scarborough GO station.

Major east–west roads in Cliffside include St. Clair Avenue, and Kingston Road.
