= Scarborough Southwest (provincial electoral district) =

Provincial electoral district in Ontario, Canada

Coordinates: 43.692°N 79.274°W

Ontario electoral district
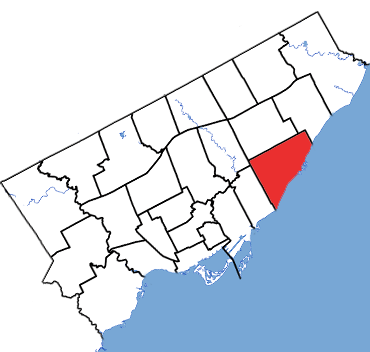
- Scarborough Southwest in relation to the other Toronto ridings

Provincial electoral district
- Legislature: Legislative Assembly of Ontario
MPP
Fatima Shaban
New Democratic
- District created: 1996
- First contested: 1999
- Last contested: 2026

Demographics
- Population (2016): 110,280
- Electors (2018): 78,329
- Area (km²): 32
- Pop. density (per km²): 3,446.3
- Census division: Toronto
- Census subdivision: Toronto

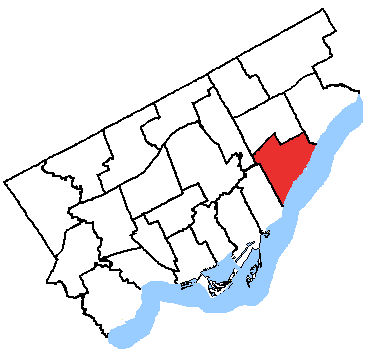
Scarborough Southwest from 2003 to 2018

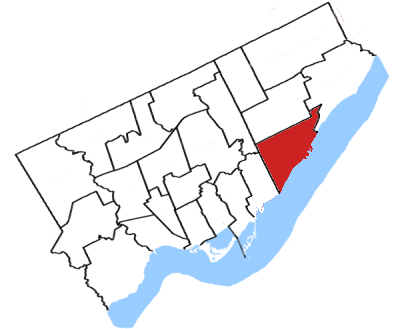
The borders of Scarborough Southwest (used in 1999 and 2003)

Scarborough Southwest is a provincial electoral district in Ontario, Canada, that has been represented in the Legislative Assembly of Ontario since 1999.

== Geography ==
It covers the southwestern part of the Scarborough part of Toronto. It stretches from Lake Ontario in the south to Eglinton Avenue in the north.

It consists of the part of the city of Toronto bounded on the west by Victoria Park Avenue, on the south by Lake Ontario, on the north by Eglinton Avenue and on the east by Markham Road.

The riding includes the neighbourhoods of Birch Cliff, Oakridge, Cliffside, Kennedy Park, Clairlea, Cliffcrest and parts of Scarborough Village, and the Golden Mile.

The provincial electoral district was created in 1999 when provincial ridings were defined to have the same borders as federal ridings.

== Members of Provincial Parliament ==
Scarborough Southwest
Assembly	Years	Member	Party
Riding created from Scarborough Centre, Scarborough West and Scarborough East
37th	1999–2003	Dan Newman	Progressive Conservative
38th	2003–2007	Lorenzo Berardinetti	Liberal
39th	2007–2011	Lorenzo Berardinetti	Liberal
40th	2011–2014	Lorenzo Berardinetti	Liberal
41st	2014–2018	Lorenzo Berardinetti	Liberal
42nd	2018–2022	Doly Begum	New Democratic
43rd	2022–2025	Doly Begum	New Democratic
44th	2025–2026	Doly Begum	New Democratic
44th	2026–present	Fatima Shaban	New Democratic
Sourced from the Ontario Legislative Assembly

== Election results ==
Ontario provincial by-election, September 3, 2026 Resignation of Doly Begum to run in a federal by-election
Party	Candidate	Votes	%	±%
New Democratic	Fatima Shaban	8,914	40.47	-2.42
Liberal	Ahsanul Hafiz	6,674	30.30	+7.36
Progressive Conservative	Noor Tarun	5,148	23.37	-7.27
Green	Mark Bekkering	753	3.38	-0.14
Ontario Party	Gord Elliott	237	1.08	–
New Blue	Chris Rees	178	0.81	–
Independent	Michael Perdelwitz	129	0.59	–
Total valid votes		22,033	99.49	+0.18
Total rejected, unmarked, and declined ballots		113	0.51	-0.18
Turnout		22,146	26.65	-15.08
Eligible voters		83,115		
New Democratic hold		Swing		-4.89
Source: Elections Ontario

2025 Ontario general election
Party	Candidate	Votes	%	±%	Expenditures
New Democratic	Doly Begum	14,557	42.89	–4.78	$120,161
Progressive Conservative	Addie Daramola	10,400	30.65	+3.04	$45,342
Liberal	Qadira Jackson	7,786	22.94	+4.38	$39,544
Green	Mark Bekkering	1,194	3.52	–0.02	$3,247
Total valid votes/expense limit		33,937	99.31	–	$131,827
Total rejected, unmarked and declined ballots		235	0.69	–0.01	
Turnout		34,172	41.73	–2.61	
Eligible voters		81,880			
New Democratic hold		Swing		–3.91	
Source: Elections Ontario

Winning party in each polling division of Scarborough Southwest at the 2022 Ontario general election

2022 Ontario general election
Party	Candidate	Votes	%	±%	Expenditures
New Democratic	Doly Begum	16,842	47.68	+2.02	$103,194
Progressive Conservative	Bret Snider	9,750	27.60	–3.62	$67,267
Liberal	Lisa Patel	6,556	18.56	–0.38	$65,227
Green	Cara Brideau	1,251	3.54	+0.84	$2,506
New Blue	Peter Naus	383	1.08	–	$609
Ontario Party	Barbara Everatt	320	0.91	–	$0
None of the Above	James McNair	114	0.32	–0.19	$0
Independent	Michelle Parsons	110	0.31	–	$0
Total valid votes/expense limit		35,326	99.31	–	$112,311
Total rejected, unmarked and declined ballots		247	0.69	–0.33	
Turnout		35,573	44.34	–11.69	
Eligible voters		80,222			
New Democratic hold		Swing		+2.82	
Source: Elections Ontario

2018 Ontario general election
Party	Candidate	Votes	%	±%
New Democratic	Doly Begum	19,835	45.66	+22.09
Progressive Conservative	Gary Ellis	13,565	31.22	+10.25
Liberal	Lorenzo Berardinetti	8,228	18.94	–30.99
Green	David Del Grande	1,174	2.70	–1.36
None of the Above	Allen Atkinson	222	0.51	–
Libertarian	James Speirs	195	0.45	–
Special Needs	Willie Little	160	0.37	–
Trillium	Bobby Turley	64	0.15	–
Total valid votes		43,443	98.97	
Total rejected, unmarked and declined ballots		451	1.03	
Turnout		43,894	56.04	
Eligible voters		78,329		
New Democratic notional gain from Liberal		Swing		+26.54
Source: Elections Ontario

2014 general election redistributed results
Party	Vote	%
Liberal	18,123	49.93
New Democratic	8,555	23.57
Progressive Conservative	7,611	20.97
Green	1,476	4.07
Others	530	1.46

2014 Ontario general election
Party	Candidate	Votes	%	±%
Liberal	Lorenzo Berardinetti	18,420	50.23	+6.13
New Democratic	Jessie Macaulay	8,674	23.65	–7.80
Progressive Conservative	Nita Kang	7,573	20.65	–0.70
Green	David del Grande	1,493	4.07	+1.72
Libertarian	Tyler Rose	328	0.89	–
Independent	Jean-Baptiste Foaleng	185	0.50	–
Total valid votes		36,673	98.84	
Total rejected, unmarked and declined ballots		429	1.16	+0.69
Turnout		37,102	49.91	+2.13
Eligible voters		74,333		
Liberal hold		Swing		+6.97
Source: Elections Ontario

2011 Ontario general election
Party	Candidate	Votes	%	±%
Liberal	Lorenzo Berardinetti	14,585	44.09	–2.06
New Democratic	Bruce Budd	10,404	31.45	+13.35
Progressive Conservative	Mike Chopowick	7,061	21.35	–4.18
Green	Robin Andrew McKim	777	2.35	–5.74
Freedom	Caroline Blanco-Ruibal	250	0.76	–
Total valid votes		33,077	99.53	
Total rejected, unmarked and declined ballots		155	0.47	–0.64
Turnout		33,232	47.78	–1.92
Eligible voters		69,553		
Liberal hold		Swing		–7.70
Source: Elections Ontario

2007 Ontario general election
Party	Candidate	Votes	%	±%
Liberal	Lorenzo Berardinetti	15,114	46.15	+0.94
Progressive Conservative	Gary Crawford	8,359	25.53	–6.05
New Democratic	Jay Sarkar	5,930	18.11	+0.20
Green	Stefan Dixon	2,649	8.09	–
Family Coalition	Wiktor Pawel Borkowski	399	1.22	–
Libertarian	George J. Dance	296	0.90	–
Total valid votes		32,747	98.90	
Total rejected, unmarked and declined ballots		365	1.10	
Turnout		33,112	49.70	
Eligible voters		66,624		
Liberal notional hold		Swing		+3.49
Source: Elections Ontario

2003 general election redistributed results
Party	Vote	%
Liberal	15,487	45.22
Progressive Conservative	10,814	31.57
New Democratic	6,132	17.90
Others	1,816	5.30

2003 Ontario general election
Party	Candidate	Votes	%	±%
Liberal	Lorenzo Berardinetti	17,501	46.93	+13.28
Progressive Conservative	Dan Newman	11,826	31.71	–8.05
New Democratic	Barbara Warner	6,688	17.94	–5.28
Green	Andrew Strachan	689	1.85	+0.64
Family Coalition	Ray Scott	586	1.57	+0.29
Total valid votes		37,290	99.20	
Total rejected, unmarked and declined ballots		300	0.80	–0.35
Turnout		37,590	54.88	–3.28
Eligible voters		68,497		
Liberal gain from Progressive Conservative		Swing		+10.66
Source: Elections Ontario

1999 Ontario general election
Party	Candidate	Votes	%
Progressive Conservative	Dan Newman	15,349	39.76
Liberal	Adrian Heaps	12,992	33.66
New Democratic	Michael Yorke	8,962	23.22
Family Coalition	Wiktor Pawel Borkowski	495	1.28
Green	Barbara Schaefer	466	1.21
Natural Law	Laurence Corp	339	0.88
Total valid votes		38,603	98.85
Total rejected, unmarked and declined ballots		450	1.15
Turnout		39,053	58.16
Eligible voters		67,148	
Progressive Conservative pickup new district.			
Source: Elections Ontario

== 2007 electoral reform referendum ==
2007 Ontario electoral reform referendum
Side	Votes	%
First Past the Post	18,860	59.2
Mixed member proportional	12,890	40.8
Total valid votes	31,750	100.0
Sourced from Elections Ontario.

== See also ==
- List of Ontario provincial electoral districts
- Canadian provincial electoral districts
