= Doly Begum =

Canadian politician (born 1989)

Doly Begum MP
- ডলি বেগম
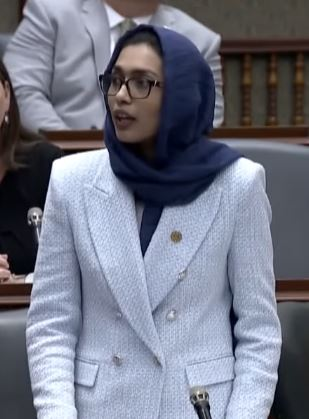
- Begum in 2023

Member of Parliament for Scarborough Southwest
- Incumbent
- Assumed office April 13, 2026
- Preceded by: Bill Blair

Member of Provincial Parliament for Scarborough Southwest
- In office June 7, 2018 – February 3, 2026
- Preceded by: Lorenzo Berardinetti
- Succeeded by: Fatima Shaban

Deputy leader of the Ontario New Democratic Party
- In office July 13, 2022 – February 3, 2026 Serving with Sol Mamakwa
- Leader: Peter Tabuns (interim); Marit Stiles
- Preceded by: John Vanthof and Sara Singh

Personal details
- Born: September 5, 1989 (age 37) Moulvibazar District, Bangladesh
- Party: Liberal (since 2026)
- Other political affiliations: Ontario New Democratic (2018–2026)
- Spouse: Rizuan Rahman (died 2024)
- Education: University of Toronto (BA); University College London (MA)
- Website: dolybegum.liberal.ca

Doly Begum (Bengali: ডলি বেগম; born September 5, 1989) is a Canadian politician who has been the member of Parliament (MP) for Scarborough Southwest since 2026 as a member of the Liberal Party. Previously, she was the member of Provincial Parliament (MPP) for Scarborough Southwest from 2018 to 2026 and a member of the Ontario New Democratic Party (NDP), serving as deputy leader from 2022 to 2026. She resigned as MPP and deputy provincial NDP leader in 2026 to run for the federal Liberal Party in the 2026 Scarborough Southwest federal by-election. She is the first person of Bangladeshi origin to serve as an MP.

== Early life, education and career ==
Begum was born September 5, 1989, in the Moulvibazar District of Bangladesh. She immigrated to Canada as a child with her family, and was raised in Scarborough, Ontario, attending W. A. Porter Collegiate Institute in the Clairlea neighbourhood of Toronto.

She obtained a Bachelor of Arts from the University of Toronto in political science, and a Master of Arts in development, administration and planning from University College London. Prior to her candidacy, she was co-chair of the Scarborough Health Coalition, vice-chair of Warden Woods Community Centre, a research analyst at the Society of Energy Professionals, and was the chief coordinator of the province-wide Keep Hydro Public campaign.

== Political career ==
=== Provincial politics ===
In the 2018 Ontario general election, Begum ran as the NDP candidate for Scarborough Southwest. The riding has a large immigrant population, constituting 45 per cent of the riding's population, with Bangladeshi Canadians accounting for 16 per cent. She won the riding with 46 per cent of the vote, defeating 15-year Liberal incumbent Lorenzo Berardinetti. At 29, Doly Begum was the youngest member of her party's caucus and is the first Bangladeshi-Canadian to be elected to a legislative body in Canada.

She was named the Official Opposition critic for immigration services and for international credentials on August 11, 2024. Begum previously served as the Official Opposition critic for citizenship, foreign credentials and immigration services, deputy opposition whip from August 2019 to February 2021, critic for early learning and childcare from August 2018 to February 2021 and a member of the Standing Committee on Social Policy from July 2018 to October 2019.

In 2020, Begum introduced a private member's bill that would mark June as Filipino Heritage Month. The bill passed its final reading and received Royal Assent on May 20, 2021, officially proclaiming June as Filipino Heritage Month in Ontario.

On July 13, 2022, Begum was named a deputy leader of the Ontario New Democratic Party, alongside Sol Mamakwa.

=== Federal politics ===
On February 3, 2026, she announced her resignation from the Ontario NDP and the Ontario legislature in order to contest the 2026 Scarborough Southwest federal by-election as the Liberal Party candidate. She won the by-election on April 13 and was elected the member of Parliament (MP) for the riding of Scarborough Southwest, becoming Canada's first Bangladeshi MP.

== Election results ==
Canadian federal by-election, April 13, 2026: Scarborough Southwest Resignation of Bill Blair
Party	Candidate	Votes	%	±%
Liberal	Doly Begum	20,121	69.60	+8.12
Conservative	Diana Filipova	5,433	18.79	–11.77
New Democratic	Fatima Shaban	1,714	5.92	+0.92
Green	Pooja Malhotra	711	2.46	+1.08
Independent	April Francisco	422	1.50	N/A
People's	Peter Koubakis	265	0.92	-0.12
Christian Heritage	David Vedova	143	0.49	N/A
Centrist	Lyall Sanders	100	0.35	+0.04
Total valid votes		28,909		
Total rejected ballots		89		
Turnout		28,998	33.80	–29.52
Eligible voters		85,796		
Liberal hold		Swing		+8.12
Source: Elections Canada

2025 Ontario general election: Scarborough Southwest
Party	Candidate	Votes	%	±%	Expenditures
New Democratic	Doly Begum	14,557	42.89	–4.78	$120,161
Progressive Conservative	Addie Daramola	10,400	30.65	+3.04	$45,342
Liberal	Qadira Jackson	7,786	22.94	+4.38	$39,544
Green	Mark Bekkering	1,194	3.52	–0.02	$3,247
Total valid votes/expense limit		33,937	99.31	–	$131,827
Total rejected, unmarked and declined ballots		235	0.69	–0.01	
Turnout		34,172	41.73	–2.61	
Eligible voters		81,880			
New Democratic hold		Swing		–3.91	
Source: Elections Ontario

2022 Ontario general election: Scarborough Southwest
Party	Candidate	Votes	%	±%	Expenditures
New Democratic	Doly Begum	16,842	47.68	+2.02	$103,194
Progressive Conservative	Bret Snider	9,750	27.60	–3.62	$67,267
Liberal	Lisa Patel	6,556	18.56	–0.38	$65,227
Green	Cara Brideau	1,251	3.54	+0.84	$2,506
New Blue	Peter Naus	383	1.08	–	$609
Ontario Party	Barbara Everatt	320	0.91	–	$0
None of the Above	James McNair	114	0.32	–0.19	$0
Independent	Michelle Parsons	110	0.31	–	$0
Total valid votes/expense limit		35,326	99.31	–	$112,311
Total rejected, unmarked and declined ballots		247	0.69	–0.33	
Turnout		35,573	44.34	–11.69	
Eligible voters		80,222			
New Democratic hold		Swing		+2.82	
Source: Elections Ontario

2018 Ontario general election: Scarborough Southwest
Party	Candidate	Votes	%	±%
New Democratic	Doly Begum	19,835	45.66	+22.09
Progressive Conservative	Gary Ellis	13,565	31.22	+10.25
Liberal	Lorenzo Berardinetti	8,228	18.94	–30.99
Green	David Del Grande	1,174	2.70	–1.36
None of the Above	Allen Atkinson	222	0.51	–
Libertarian	James Speirs	195	0.45	–
Special Needs	Willie Little	160	0.37	–
Trillium	Bobby Turley	64	0.15	–
Total valid votes		43,443	98.97	
Total rejected, unmarked and declined ballots		451	1.03	
Turnout		43,894	56.04	
Eligible voters		78,329		
New Democratic notional gain from Liberal		Swing		+26.54
Source: Elections Ontario

== Personal life ==
Begum was married to Bangladeshi-Canadian lawyer Rizuan Rahman until his death from cancer in September 2024.
