= List of by-elections in South Korea =

By-elections are held in South Korea when a political office becomes vacant.

== List ==
- 2011 Seoul mayoral by-election
- 2011
- 2012
- 2013
- 2014
- 2015
- 2016
- 2017
- 2018
- 2019
- 2020
- 2021
- 2022
- 2022 Sangdang by-election
- 2025
