= By-election =

Election to fill a vacant political office

A by-election (also spelled bye-election in Ireland), known as a special election in the United States and the Philippines, or a bypoll in India, is an election used to fill an office that has become vacant between general elections.

A vacancy may arise as a result of an incumbent's death or resignation, when the incumbent becomes ineligible to continue in office (because of a recall, a prohibited dual mandate, criminal conviction, or failure to maintain a minimum attendance), or when an election is invalidated by voting irregularities. In some cases, a vacancy may be filled by a method other than a by-election (such as the outgoing member's party nominating a replacement), or the office may be left vacant. These elections may be held at any time in the country.

An election to fill a vacancy created when a general election cannot take place in a particular constituency (such as if a candidate dies shortly before election day) may be called a by-election in some jurisdictions, or may have a distinct name (e.g., supplementary election, as in Australia).

By-elections differ from snap elections in that snap elections typically elect the entire legislative or parliamentary body, whereas by-elections are typically limited to vacant positions. However, in elections to an executive post, such as a president, a governor, or a mayor, every by-election is a snap election by definition, as there is only one elective position in the "executive body". Furthermore, recall elections are typically called before a member is removed from office, whereas by-elections are usually called after.

== Origins ==
The procedure for filling a vacant seat in the House of Commons of England was developed during the Reformation Parliament of the 16th century by Thomas Cromwell; previously a seat had remained empty upon the death of a member. Cromwell devised a new election that would be called by the king at a time of the king's choosing. This made it a simple matter to ensure the seat rewarded an ally of the crown.

During the eighteen-year Cavalier Parliament of Charles II, which lasted from 1661 to 1679, by-elections were the primary means by which new members entered the House of Commons.

== In assemblies ==
=== In single-member constituencies ===
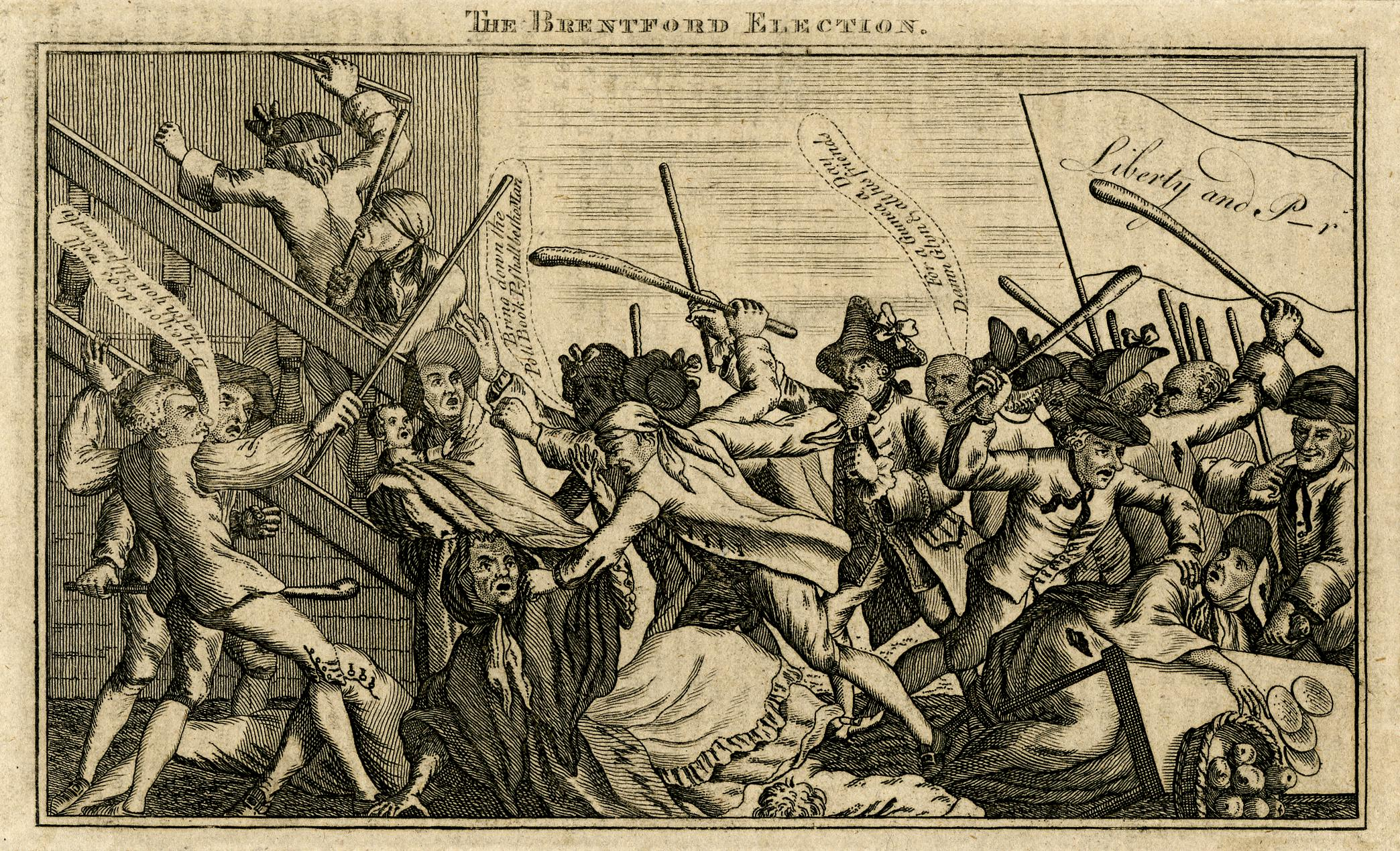
A 1768 political cartoon about a by-election during the Middlesex election affair.

By-elections are held in most nations that elect their parliaments through single-member constituencies, whether with or without a runoff round. This includes most Commonwealth countries, such as the United Kingdom, Canada, Australia and New Zealand, as well as non-Commonwealth countries such as France and Italy (until 2006). However, in some cases, such as the French National Assembly, by-elections are only used to fill some vacancies, with the others being filled by the assumption of a seat by a running mate nominated by the vacator. If a vacancy arises shortly before a planned general election, there is usually no by-election and the seat remains vacant until the general election.

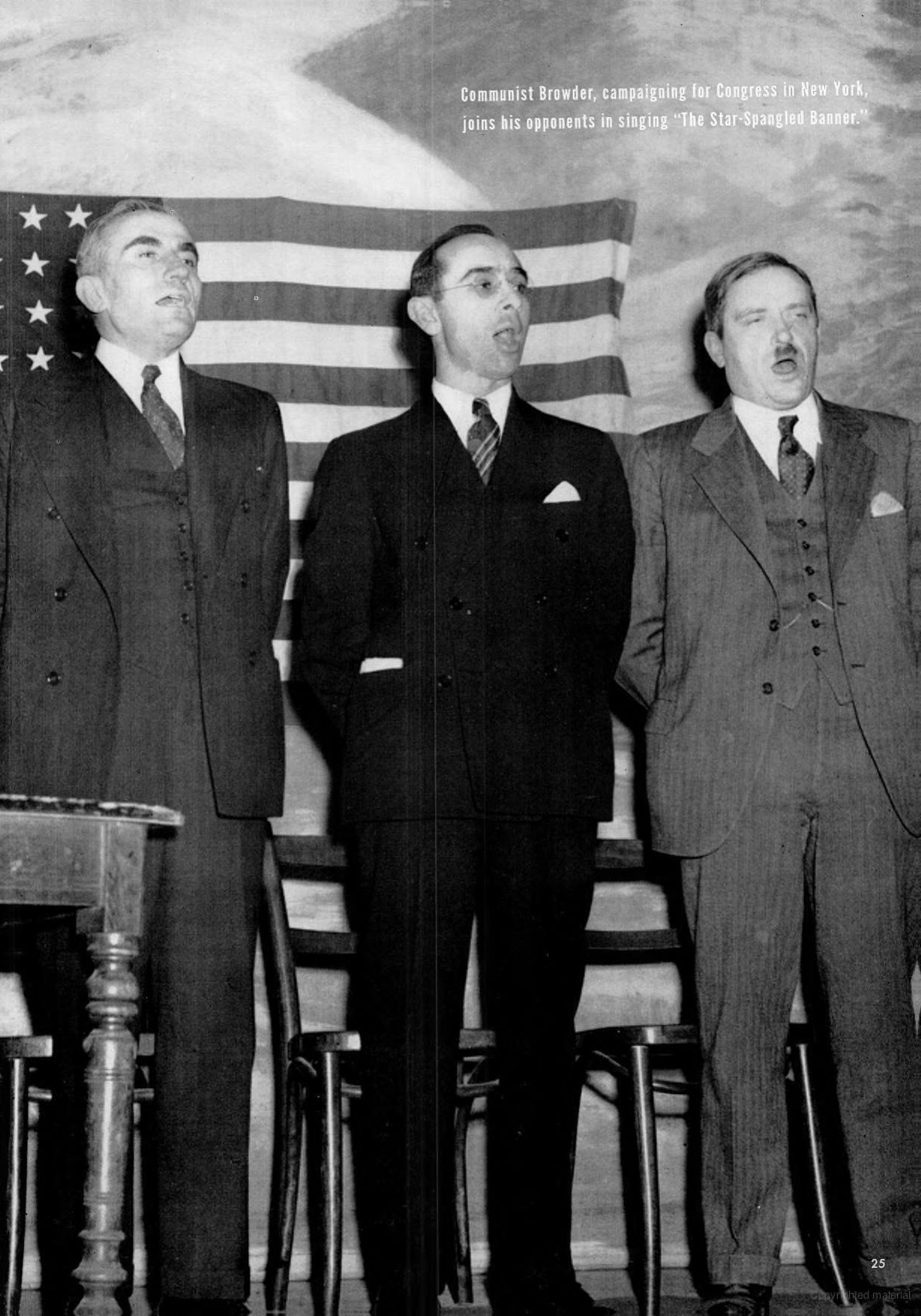
Democrat Morris Edelstein (left), Republican Louis Lefkowitz (center) and Communist Earl Browder, candidates in a special election to fill the vacancy caused by the death of Democrat William I. Sirovich, sing "The Star-Spangled Banner" at a "Democracy in Action" joint campaign meeting, January 30, 1940

In the United States, these contests have been called "special elections" because they do not always occur on Election Day like regular congressional elections. Special elections are held when a seat in the House of Representatives, state legislature, or local legislature becomes vacant. At the federal level, the U.S. Constitution requires that vacancies in the House of Representatives be filled with a special election (unlike the Senate, where it is up to law of the state involved to determine how the vacancy is filled). In most cases where a vacancy is filled through a special election, a primary will also be held to determine which candidates will represent the major parties.

=== In multi-member constituencies ===
When one seat in a multi-member constituency becomes vacant, the consequences vary. For example, a by-election may be held to fill just the vacancy, all the seats in the constituency could be contested in the by-election, or the vacancy could be filled by other means.

Typically, party-list proportional representation systems do not hold by-elections. Instead, the most successful unelected candidate named on the vacator's list fills the vacancy automatically. However, Turkey is an exception, as it holds by-elections when too many seats become vacant in the parliament (as in 1986) or a repeat vote has to be held (as in 2003).

In multi-member district systems that do not employ party lists – single transferable vote, single non-transferable vote and plurality at-large – vacancies may be filled by a by-election. This is done, for example, in the Dáil of the Republic of Ireland (STV), in the Parliament of Vanuatu (SNTV), and in the Senate of the Philippines (Pl. AL). In those systems, alternatives to holding a by-election include:

1. re-determining the election results with the vacators disregarded, as in Tasmania or the Australian Capital Territory,
2. keeping the seat vacant until the next general election. This usually occurs if a vacancy arises shortly before a planned general election (within six months in New Zealand).
3. nominating another candidate with the same affiliation as the former member, such as European Parliament seats in the Republic of Ireland.

For the Australian Senate (in which each state forms a multi-member constituency elected via single transferable vote), the state parliament appoints a replacement in the event of a vacancy; in 1977 a referendum amended the Constitution to require that the person appointed must belong to the same political party (if any) as the Senator originally elected to that seat. The states with an upper house elected via STV (NSW, Victoria, and South Australia) use the same method, except for Western Australia, which holds a recount of ballots to determine the new winner, with sitting members retaining their seats.

=== In mixed systems ===
Mixed-member proportional representation, additional member, and parallel voting systems, in which some members are chosen by party lists and some from single-member constituencies, usually hold by-elections to fill a vacancy in a constituency seat; for example, the assassination of Shinzo Abe resulted in a by-election in Yamaguchi's 4th district, which Abe represented in the House of Representatives of Japan (elected under parallel voting). If a vacancy arises in a party list seat, it would be filled in the manner usual for party-list proportional systems; for example, on the resignation of Darren Hughes from the Parliament of New Zealand in March 2011, Louisa Wall filled the seat after all the five candidates above her on the New Zealand Labour Party's list declined it.

Exceptions to this rule exist: In the German Bundestag, which uses mixed-member proportional representation, by-elections were originally held upon the vacancy of any constituency seat. This was changed in January 1953, since which time vacancies in constituency seats have been filled by the next candidate on the state list of the party which won the seat, in the same manner as vacancies among list seats. Confusingly, this change occurred alongside a switch from mixed single vote, where a single set of votes was used for both constituency and list seats, to a conventional two-vote mixed member proportional system – a change which granted constituency members an electoral mandate distinct from the party's list seats. By-elections were then only held if a vacancy arose in a constituency seat and there was no associated party list with which to fill it – typically, if the former member was elected as an independent. This was referred to as a substitute election (Ersatzwahl). Since no independents had been elected to the Bundestag since the first legislative period, no such substitute election ever took place. In the 2023 electoral reform (which most prominently changed the rules for electing constituency candidates, so that the party's lowest-performing constituency candidates would not be elected if their election would give the party seats beyond its proportional share of the vote, albeit still retaining separate sets of votes for the constituency and list seats), this has been changed again so that party candidates have to have a party list (and therefore, their vacancies would be filled from the list) and any vacancies left by independent candidates remain vacant until the next election.

== In executive positions ==
By-elections are also possible on directly-elected executive positions such as presidents, governors and mayors; in this case, such a by-election is also a snap election, as the chief executive position comprises the entire "executive body" rather than one seat among many of it. Many presidents, mostly in presidential systems but sometimes in semi-presidential and parliamentary systems as well, have vice presidents that do not necessiate such procedures.

Gubernatorial and mayoral special elections have been held in the United States.

In the Phlippines, special elections for the president and vice president are to be held if both positions are vacant at the same time, and the next scheduled presidential election is more than 18 months away.

In South Korea, presidential elections held outside schedule after the president was vacated, such as in 2025, but the winner serves an entire full term instead of just the remaining months of the original term. By-elections to local officials are also held.

By-elections for mayor and magistrates are held in Taiwan.

The mayor of Vaduz, the capital of Liechtenstein, was determined in a 2024 by-election.

== Significance and consequences ==
=== Direct effects ===
By-elections can be crucial when the ruling party has only a small majority. In parliamentary systems, party discipline is often so strong that the governing party or coalition can only lose a vote of no confidence after losing enough supporters, whether by floor-crossing or through losing by-elections, for it to become a minority government. Examples are the Labour government of James Callaghan 1976–1979 and Conservative government of John Major 1992–1997. In the United States Senate, Scott Brown's election in 2010 ended the filibuster-proof supermajority formerly enjoyed by Democrats.

By-elections can also be important if a minority party needs to gain one or more seats to gain official party status or the balance of power in a minority or coalition situation. For example, Andrea Horwath's win in an Ontario provincial by-election in 2004 allowed the Ontario New Democratic Party to regain official party status with important results in terms of parliamentary privileges and funding.

In Australia, a by-election in 1996 in the Queensland state electoral district of Mundingburra overturned the results of the 1995 state election. In that election, held in July 1995, Wayne Goss and his Labor Party had won by a slim 45-seat majority in an 89-seat parliament. The seat of Mundingburra had been awarded to the Labor Party on the basis of a majority of 16 votes. However, in December 1995 the Court of Disputed Returns threw out the result in Mundingburra after it was found that 22 overseas military personnel had been denied the chance to vote. Consequently, a by-election for Mundingburra was held in February 1996, in which the electorate was won by the opposition Liberal Party, pushing the Goss government into minority. A vote of no confidence in the government was then passed by the opposition, with the support of Independent Liz Cunningham. Following the no confidence vote, Rob Borbidge the leader of the Nationals the senior partner in the coalition became premier until his government's defeat in the 1998 state election.

=== Predictive value ===
Non-experts often interpret by-election results as a bellwether or early indicator of the results of the next general election, but political scientists generally caution against overinterpretation. The evidence suggests that while the margin of victory relative to the district's normal performance may be relevant, other indicators generally provide stronger evidence with a larger sample size.

A 2016 study of special elections to the United States House of Representatives found "that while candidate characteristics affect special election outcomes, presidential approval is predictive of special election outcomes as well. Furthermore, we find that the effect of presidential approval on special election outcomes has increased in magnitude from 1995 to 2014, with the 2002 midterm representing an important juncture in the nationalization of special elections."

Seats which have unexpectedly changed hands in by-elections often revert to the former party in the next general election. One reason for this is that voter turnout at by-elections tends to be lower and skewed toward highly motivated supporters of the opposition party.

=== Indirect impact ===
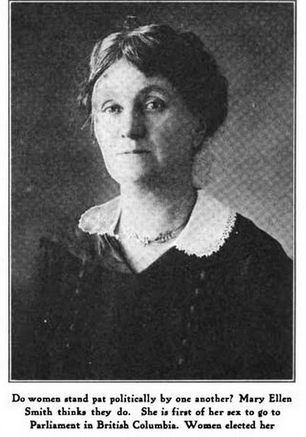
Mary Ellen Smith became the first woman in the Legislative Assembly of British Columbia in a 1918 by-election, the first election in which women of the province could vote.

By-election upsets can have a psychological impact by creating a sense of momentum for one party or a sense of impending defeat for a government. For example, in Canada, Deborah Grey's 1989 by-election victory in Beaver River was seen as evidence that the newly formed Reform Party of Canada would be a serious political contender and that it posed a serious political threat for the ruling Progressive Conservatives. Similarly, the upset 1960 by-election victory of Walter Pitman in Peterborough as a "New Party" candidate was a significant boost for the movement to replace the Co-operative Commonwealth Federation with an unnamed "New Party" which would be integrated with the labour movement. Pitman's candidacy in a riding in which the CCF was traditionally weak was seen as a test of this concept, and his upset victory convinced the CCF and the labour movement to launch the New Democratic Party (NDP). Gilles Duceppe's 1990 upset landslide by-election victory in Laurier—Sainte-Marie with 66% of the vote on behalf of the newly formed Bloc Québécois was the first electoral test for what was initially a loose parliamentary formation created two months earlier after several Quebec MPs defected from the Progressive Conservative and Liberal parties to protest the failure of the Meech Lake Accord and provided the first indication that the party could be a serious force in the province of Quebec. On the strength of the by-election victory, the BQ went on to be officially formed as a party in 1991 and win 54 seats in the 1993 federal election, enough to form the Official Opposition.

By-elections may occur singly or in small bunches, especially if the authority responsible for calling them has discretion over the timing and can procrastinate. They are sometimes bunched to save money, as holding multiple by-elections is likely to cost more than holding a by-election to fill the vacancies all at once. In Canada, in 1978, 15 by-elections were held on a single date, restoring the House of Commons to 264 members. The media called it a "mini-election", a test of the Liberal government's popularity with a general election due in less than a year. In Hong Kong, in January 2010, five members of the Legislative Council from the Pro-democracy camp, one from each of Hong Kong's five geographical constituencies, resigned and stood in simultaneous by-elections, at which the entire electorate would participate, in an attempt to stage a de facto referendum on democratizing the Hong Kong political system. The effect of the manoeuvre was blunted when the Pro-Beijing camp refused to stand candidates against them.

=== Upsets ===
==== Australia ====
The 1918 Swan by-election was held following the death of John Forrest. The seat was traditionally a safe seat for the Nationalist Party against the Labor Party, but the emergence of the Country Party lead to a "three-cornered contest". As Australia used a first-past-the-post system at the time, the conservative vote was split between the Country and Nationalists, allowing Labor candidate Edwin Corboy to come in first place and win the seat. The Swan by-election is cited as the reason for the introduction of preferential voting, to prevent Labor from benefiting from a divided opposition in the future.

The 2018 Wentworth by-election was held after the resignation of former prime minister Malcolm Turnbull, who had served as the member for Wentworth since 2004. Wentworth was considered an exceptionally safe seat for the Liberal Party, as it had only ever been held by the Liberal Party and its predecessor parties since its creation in 1901. Former Ambassador to Israel Dave Sharma was preselected as the Liberal Party's candidate for the by-election. The major challenger in the by-election was independent candidate Kerryn Phelps. A huge 17.7% two-party-preferred swing was required for the Liberal Party to lose the seat. Ultimately, the Liberals suffered a 19.0% swing to Phelps, the largest by-election swing in Australian history, which won her the seat. This loss deprived the Liberal Party of its majority in federal Parliament, forcing them into a minority government.

==== Canada ====
In 1942, the Conservatives' Arthur Meighen (who had already served as Prime Minister during the 1920s) sought to re-enter the House of Commons of Canada through a by-election in York South. His surprise defeat at the hand of Joseph W. Noseworthy of the Co-operative Commonwealth Federation ended his political career, and may also have been a factor in the Conservative Party's decision to move to the left and rebrand itself the Progressive Conservative Party under Meighen's replacement. Noseworthy's victory was also a significant breakthrough for the CCF giving it credibility as a national party where it has previously been seen as a Western Canadian regional protest party.

On November 1, 1944, General Andrew McNaughton was appointed to Cabinet as Minister of Defence without having a seat in parliament, after his predecessor resigned during the Conscription Crisis of 1944. A by-election was arranged in Grey North which the opposition Progressive Conservative party contested. The major campaign issue became the government's policy of "limited conscription" during World War II, which McNaughton supported, and which the Conservatives rejected. They called, instead, for "full conscription". McNaughton was defeated in the February 1945 by-election. As a result, with confidence in his government undermined, Prime Minister William Lyon Mackenzie King called the 1945 federal election several weeks later; originally he had intended to postpone the election until the war was clearly won. McNaughton sought a seat in the 1945 contest but was again defeated, and resigned shortly after.

The most recent example of a cabinet minister appointed from outside parliament having to resign after losing a by-election was in 1975, when Minister of Communications Pierre Juneau was appointed to Pierre Trudeau's Liberal cabinet directly from the private sector, and tried to enter parliament through a by-election in Hochelaga. Juneau unexpectedly lost to the Progressive Conservative candidate and resigned from cabinet 10 days after his by-election defeat.

In Ontario, John Tory, leader of the Progressive Conservative Party of Ontario ran in a 2009 by-election in Haliburton—Kawartha Lakes—Brock, after he convinced one of his caucus members to step down, in hopes of re-entering the Ontario legislature. His by-election defeat resulted in his resignation as party leader.

==== Hong Kong ====
In the March 2018 Hong Kong by-elections, the pro-democracy camp lost their majority status for the first time in the Geographical constituency part of the Legislative Council of Hong Kong. By-elections were held after six pro-democracy lawmakers were disqualified by the High Court of Hong Kong during the oath-taking controversy. The pro-democracy camp was considered safe in the de facto first past the post by-election because both pro-democracy camp and pro-Beijing camp would only nominate one candidate to fill in the by-election. However, the pro-democracy camp lost twice in Kowloon West, which had been considered a safe seat for them.

==== Singapore ====
Under Article 49(1) of the Constitution of Singapore, a by-election should be called for any vacancy arising from a constituency—particularly Single Member Constituency—within a reasonable time period. Since the introduction of partial self-governance in 1955, 34 by-elections have been held, and some have been major upsets:

- In the 1957 Cairnhill by-election, the then-ruling Labour Front government saw its vote collapse to 19.23% from 47.58% in the previous general election.
- Each by-election in 1961 was important for the survival of the ruling party's small majority.
  - After being dismissed as the Minister for National Development, Ong Eng Guan resigned his seat. Standing in the 1961 by-election in Hong Lim as an independent, he polled 73.31% of the vote, the largest loss of votes for an incumbent party in a by-election.
  - The 1961 by-election in Anson saw a comeback by the opposition leader, the Workers' Party Chairperson and former Chief Minister, David Marshall.
- In the 1981 Anson by-election, the Workers' Party Secretary-General J. B. Jeyaretnam broke the ruling PAP's monopoly in Parliament, marking the first opposition presence since 1966 and the re-entry of the Workers' Party into Singapore's legislature since 1961.
- The 2013 Punggol East by-election was the first time the People's Action Party lost a seat in a by-election since 1981 and the last time the ruling party failed to retain a constituency in a by-election.

==== Ireland ====
A by-election held in Dublin South-West during 2014 provided a very surprising upset. The Sinn Féin candidate, Cathal King, was the favourite to take the seat. Sinn Féin had done extremely well in the area during that year's local elections. Sinn Féin captured high percentages of the first preference vote across the constituency. However, the Anti-Austerity Alliance candidate, Paul Murphy, was elected on the eighth count. Although Murphy had received a lower first preference total than Cathal King, he outperformed the Sinn Féin candidate in attracting transfers. Murphy then took his seat in the 31st Dáil. As a direct result of this defeat in the by-election, Sinn Féin hardened their stance against Irish Water and called for the complete abolition of water charges in Ireland.

==== United Kingdom ====
In 1965, the British Foreign Secretary Patrick Gordon Walker stood in the Leyton by-election for election to the UK Parliament, having been defeated in controversial circumstances in Smethwick at the previous year's general election. His appointment as a senior minister while not a member of either house of Parliament was against convention, and he therefore sought to regularise the position by standing in the first available by-election, which was at Leyton in January 1965. However a strong swing against Labour resulted in Gordon Walker's defeat: as a result, he resigned as Foreign Secretary.

==== United States ====
In 2010, Republican Scott Brown defeated Martha Coakley in the Massachusetts special election to the United States Senate. Coakley, a Democrat, had been widely expected to win, but Brown unexpectedly closed the gap and won, a shocking result in the heavily-Democratic state of Massachusetts. This eliminated the Democratic Party's filibuster-proof majority of 60 votes and ended 53 of the 56 years ruled by the Kennedy family. Another upset occurred in the 2017 special election in Alabama, one of the most heavily Republican states in the nation. Democrat Doug Jones defeated Republican Roy Moore in a close race after Moore was accused of sexual assault by multiple women.

== See also ==
- UK parliamentary by-elections
- Widow's succession
- Types of democracy
- Lists of by-elections and special elections by jurisdiction
  - Australia: List of Australian federal by-elections
    - New South Wales: List of New South Wales state by-elections
    - Northern Territory: List of Northern Territory by-elections
    - Queensland: List of Queensland state by-elections
    - South Australia: List of South Australian House of Assembly by-elections
    - Victoria: List of Victorian state by-elections
    - Western Australia: List of Western Australian state by-elections
  - Canada: List of federal by-elections in Canada
    - Alberta: List of Alberta by-elections
    - British Columbia: List of British Columbia by-elections
    - Manitoba: List of Manitoba by-elections
    - New Brunswick: List of New Brunswick by-elections
    - Newfoundland and Labrador: List of Newfoundland and Labrador by-elections
    - Nova Scotia: List of Nova Scotia by-elections
    - Ontario: List of Ontario by-elections
    - Saskatchewan: List of Saskatchewan by-elections
    - Quebec: List of Quebec by-elections
    - Yukon: List of Yukon by-elections
  - Dominica: List of by-elections in Dominica
  - Falkland Islands: List of Falkland Islands by-elections
  - France: List of by-elections to the National Assembly (France)
  - Hong Kong: List of Hong Kong by-elections
  - Hungary: List of Hungarian by-elections
  - Jamaica: Jamaican parliamentary by-elections
  - Ireland: List of Dáil by-elections, List of Seanad by-elections
  - Italy: By-elections in Italy
  - Liberia: List of by-elections in Liberia
  - Malaysia: List of parliamentary by-elections in Malaysia
    - States in Malaysia: List of state by-elections in Malaysia
  - Nauru: List of Nauruan parliamentary by-elections
  - New Zealand: List of New Zealand by-elections
  - Philippines: List of special elections in the Philippines
  - Solomon Islands: List of Solomon Islands by-elections
  - South Korea: List of South Korea by-elections
  - Tuvalu: List of by-elections in Tuvalu
  - United Kingdom: Lists of United Kingdom by-elections
  - United States:
    - List of special elections to the United States House of Representatives
    - List of special elections to the United States Senate
  - Zimbabwe: 2022 Zimbabwean by-elections
