= 2026 Hamilton, Ontario, municipal election =

Canadian municipal election

2026 Hamilton municipal election
- October 26, 2026

1 mayor and 15 councillors
- Opinion polls
- Turnout: 31.59%
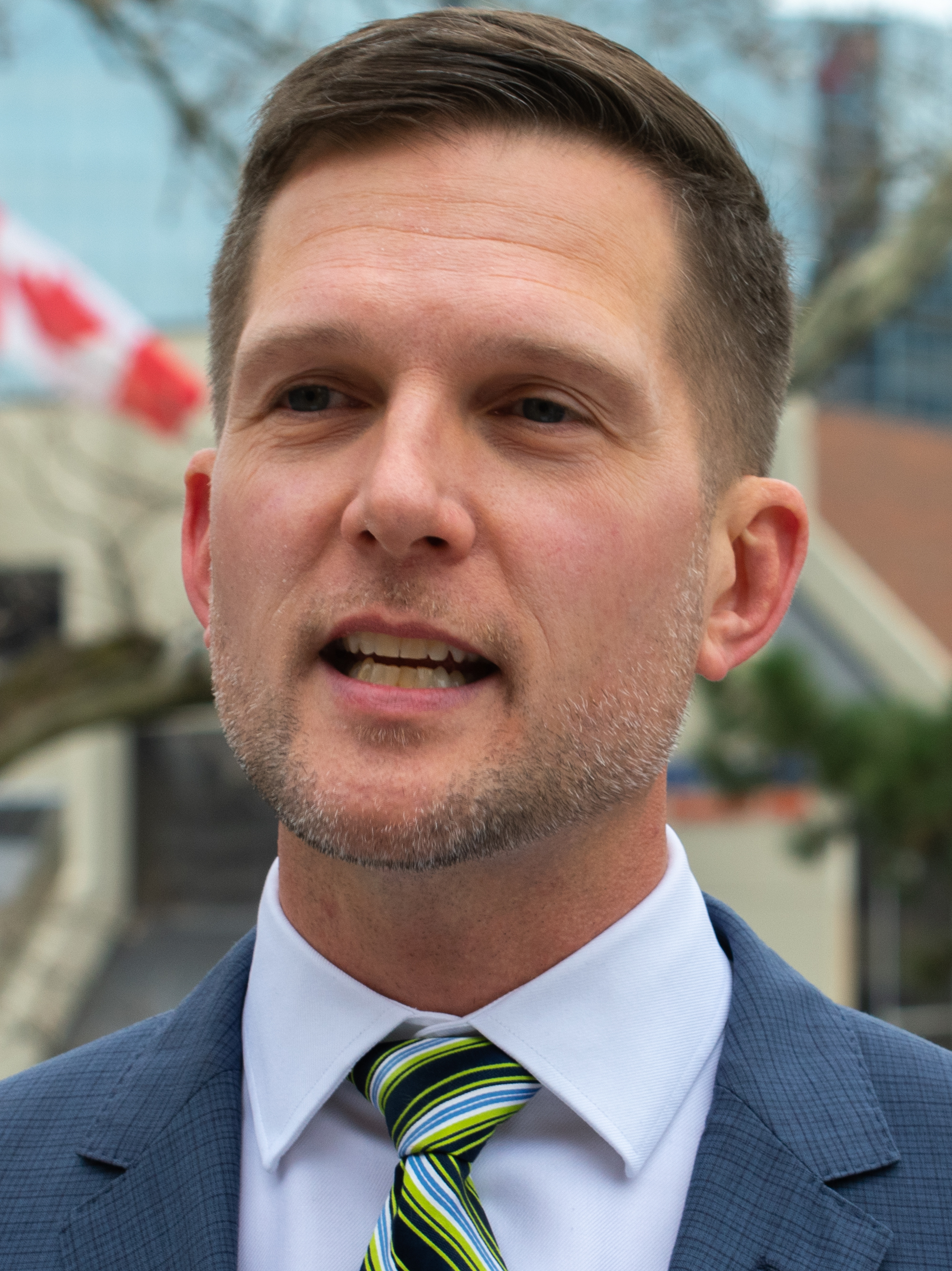

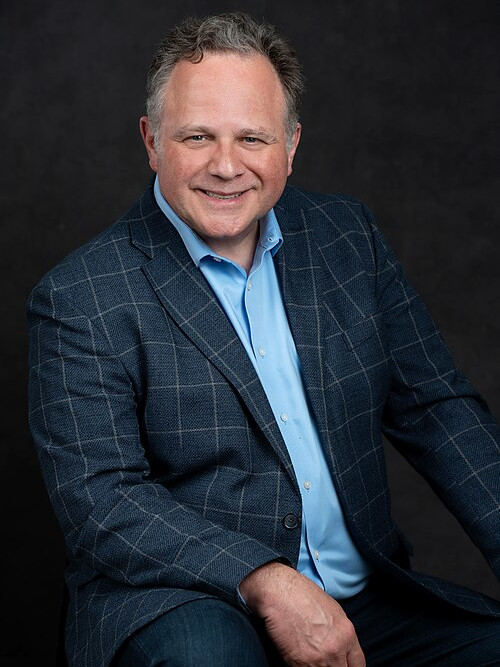

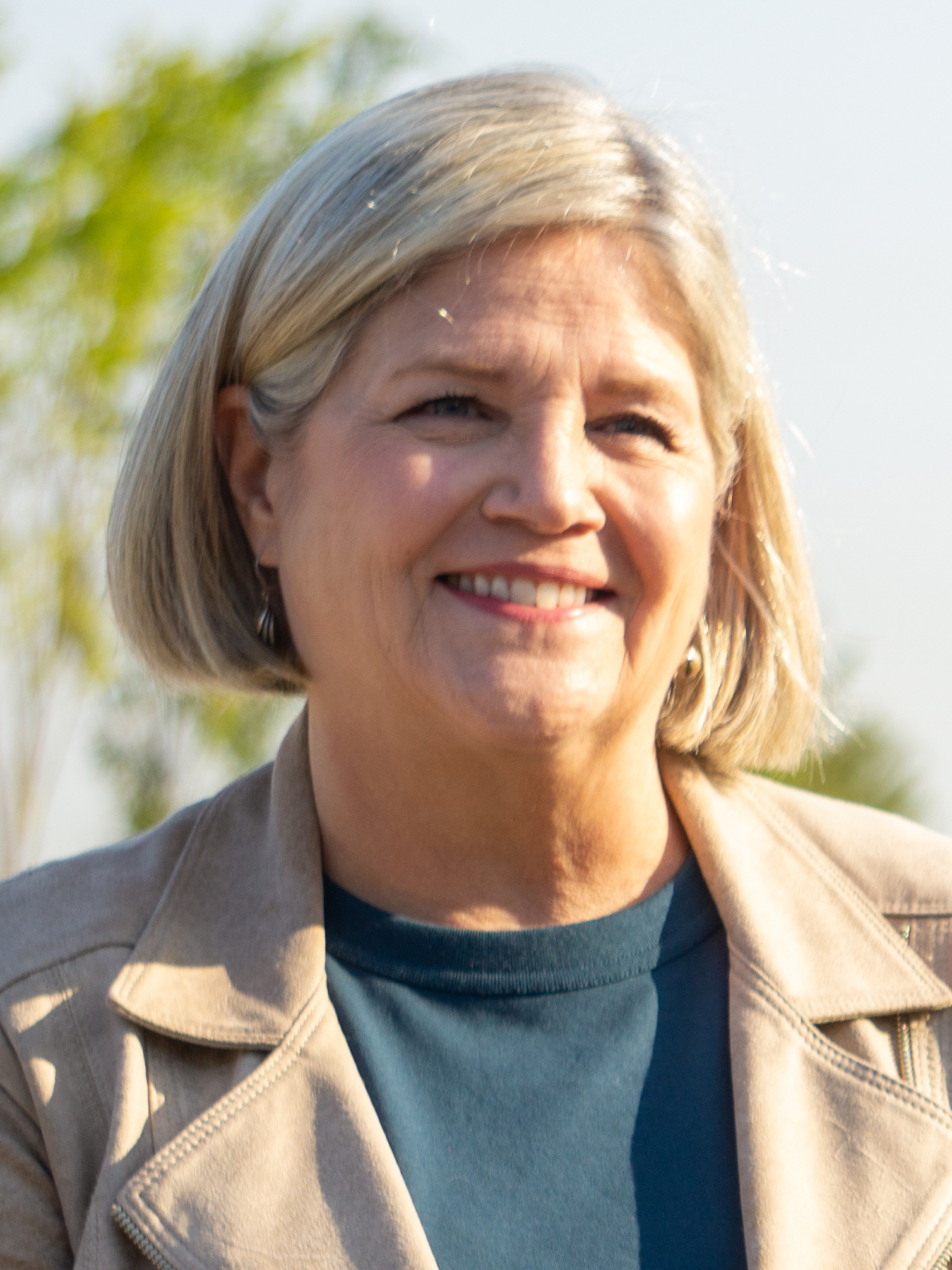
Candidate	Keanin Loomis	Rob Cooper
Popular vote	61,040	46,573
Percentage	41.77%	31.87%
Candidate	Andrea Horwath
Popular vote	21,223
Percentage	14.52%
- Results by ward
Mayor before election
Andrea Horwath
Elected Mayor
Keanin Loomis

The 2026 Hamilton municipal election took place on October 26, 2026, as per the Ontario Municipal Elections Act, 1996. This was the 136th municipal election in the history of Hamilton and the 8th election since Hamilton's amalgamation in 2001.

Residents of Hamilton elected one mayor and members of the Hamilton City Council using a first-past-the-post electoral system in single-member constituencies, called wards.

Based on their electoral registration, voters were also eligible to elect one of 11 Hamilton-Wentworth District School Board trustees, nine Hamilton-Wentworth Catholic District School Board trustees, one Conseil scolaire Viamonde trustee, or one Conseil scolaire catholique MonAvenir trustee. The status of school trustee elections was uncertain until roughly three weeks before the start of the nomination period, with the provincial government threatening to reducing the number of trustees or abolishing the office of school trustee altogether. Legislation tabled on 13 April 2026 confirmed the continued direct election of school trustees.

== Mayoral election ==
In 2022, former Ontario NDP leader Andrea Horwath won a narrow victory over Keanin Loomis, the past president of the Hamilton Chamber of Commerce. Horwath won with 1.2 percent over Loomis while former mayor Bob Bratina fell far behind with just 12.3 percent of the vote. After taking office, Horwath maintained a more "cautious" approach to governing, often voting with councillors across the political spectrum.

Criticism of Horwath's leadership and management of the city's infrastructure, issues with homelessness, and stalled economic growth started early in her tenure and led to speculation about her electoral future and possible opposing candidates in the 2026 election. The first major candidate to announce a bid to oppose Horwath was Scarlett Gillespie (also known by her stage name Jelena Vermilion), a community organizer, affordable housing activist, and executive director of the Sex Workers' Action Program (SWAP) Hamilton, in 2025. Gillespie identifies as a transgender woman. While accepting an award from the Hamilton YWCA in 2024 for her advocacy work, she made comments criticizing police violence that resulted in a volunteer committee of Hamilton Police Service members pulling back from fundraising for the local YWCA. Her platform prioritized "housing, tenant protections, climate justice, transparency at city hall, community-led initiatives and strengthening the arts sector".

In the 2025 Canadian federal election, Ward 8 Councillor John-Paul Danko was elected Member of Parliament for the riding of Hamilton West—Ancaster—Dundas. Hamilton City Council opted to hold a by-election for Danko's vacant seat in September of 2025. The by-election was won by Rob Cooper, a chartered professional accountant and veteran organizer with the Progressive Conservative Party of Ontario and Conservative Party of Canada. Cooper and Horwath clashed frequently on council, particularly around the municipal budget which, after the introduction of strong mayor powers in Ontario, became the responsibility of the mayor's office. Cooper's decision to run for mayor stemmed from his frustration around the municipal budget and the lack of power granted individual councillors to impact budget decisions.

=== Candidates ===
Candidate	Experience	Announced	Registered	Ref
Sasha Austin	Indigenous Patient Navigator at De Dwa da Dehs-Nyes Indigenous Health Centre	May 4, 2026; Website	May 4, 2026	
Ejaz Butt	Former Major in the Pakistan Armed Forces; Founding President of the Ontario Taxi Workers Union	May 1, 2026	May 1, 2026	
David Mark Cherkewski	Anti-poverty activist	August 21, 2026	August 21, 2026	
Rob Cooper	Ward 8 City Councillor (2025–2026), Chartered Professional Accountant, Former organizer with the Progressive Conservative Party of Ontario and Conservative Party of Canada, Senior Strategy Executive (2020-2025), Vice President Strategy at Workplace Safety and Insurance Board (2017-2020), Chief Internal Auditor at McMaster University (2010-2014)	March 3, 2026; Website	May 1, 2026	
Paul Fromm	Neo-Nazi, Holocaust-denier, white-supremacist, and perennial candidate	June 29, 2026	June 29, 2026	
Scarlett Gillespie	Executive director of the Sex Workers' Action Program (SWAP) Hamilton, sex worker	July 29, 2025; Website	May 1, 2026	
Andrea Horwath	Mayor of Hamilton (2022–present); Leader of the Ontario New Democratic Party (2009–2022); MPP for Hamilton Centre (2004–2022); Ward 2 Councillor (1997–2004)	July 10, 2025; Website	August 14, 2026	
David Harrison	Volunteer firefighter, reservist with the Canadian Armed Forces	August 21, 2026	August 21, 2026	
Erin Janus	Animal rights activist	August 21, 2026	August 21, 2026	
Keanin Loomis	Runner-up, 2022 mayoral election President & CEO of the Canadian Institute of Steel Construction (2024–2026) Vice President, Member Services at the Ontario Chamber of Commerce (2023-2024); President & CEO of the Hamilton Chamber of Commerce (2013–2022)	February 25, 2025; Website	May 8, 2026	
Pamela Mitchell	Candidate for Ward 13 - Dundas councillor (2014 and 2018); Candidate for Ward 12 - Ancaster councillor (2022)	June 23, 2026	June 23, 2026	
Kevin Walker	Outreach worker with Gateway/Parkview Ministries	August 14, 2026	August 14, 2026	
Nathalie Xian Yi Yan	Perennial candidate Traditional Chinese medicine practitioner	May 27, 2026	May 27, 2026	

==== Declined or ineligible ====
- Bob Bratina - mayor of Hamilton from 2010–2014, Liberal member of Parliament for Hamilton East—Stoney Creek from 2015–2021
- Chad Collins - Liberal member of Parliament for Hamilton East—Stoney Creek from 2021–2025, Ward 5 councillor from 1997–2021
- Peter Dyakowski - local landlord, offensive lineman for the Hamilton Tiger-Cats (2007–2016), 2019 Conservative Party of Canada candidate for MP on Hamilton Mountain
- Vito Sgro - 2018 candidate for mayor, 2021 Liberal Party of Canada candidate for MP in Flamborough—Glanbrook
- Mike Spadafora - Ward 14 councillor from 2022–present, 2018 Progressive Conservative Party of Ontario candidate for MPP on Hamilton Mountain (running for re-election in Ward 14)
- Monique Taylor - member of Provincial Parliament for Hamilton Mountain from 2011–2025 (ran for MPP in Hamilton East—Stoney Creek)

=== Mayoral endorsements ===
Rob Cooper

Retired Politicians

- Bob Bratina, Mayor of Hamilton (2010-2014), Liberal MP for Hamilton East-Stoney Creek (2015 - 2021)
- Paul Miller, NDP/Independent Hamilton East-Stoney Creek MPP
- Lloyd Ferguson, Ward 12 - Ancaster councillor (2006-2022)
- Robert Pasuta, Ward 14 - Wentworth councillor (2006-2018)
- Scott Duvall NDP Member of Parliament for Hamilton Mountain (2015-2021)

Unions and Union Leaders

- Joseph Mancinelli, International Vice President of the Laborers' International Union of North America
- LiUNA Local 837
- Labourers’ International Union of North America
- United Association of Journeymen and Apprentices of the Plumbing and Pipe Fitting Industry Local 67
Scarlett Gillespie

Activists and Community Organizations

- Fae Johnstone, Executive Director of Queer Momentum
- Municipal Socialist Alliance
- SOPEN Hamilton (The Substance Overdose Prevention and Education Network)

Local Musicians and Performers

- Ava Val, comedian
- B.A. Johnston, comedian and musician
- Lawrence Jupiter Music

Media Personalities

- Natalie Bencivenga, Independent journalist
- Smoothie Lou, musician and social media personality

Notable Community Members

- David MacMullen (@D0pe.Gh0st), community event organizer
- Lyla Miklos, local queer feminist activist
- Rae Lockdust: Producer of Uncloseted Comedy

Retired Politicians

- Cheri DiNovo, NDP MPP for Parkdale-High Park (2006-2017)

Unions and Union Leaders

- CUPE 3906, McMaster Union Local for TAs, Sessional Faculty, Post Doctoral Fellows, and Residence Life Workers
- Fred Hahn, CUPE Ontario President & OFL Vice President
- Hamilton & District Labour Council (marked as "highly recommended", not endorsed)
- Sid Ryan, former President of the Ontario Federation of Labour (OFL)
Andrea Horwath
- No endorsements as of Oct 8, 2026
Keanin Loomis

Municipal Politicians

- Maureen Wilson, Ward 1 Councillor (2018 - Present)

Notable community members

- Jeff Paikin, President of New Horizon Development Corporation
- Tyler Banham, past President of the Liberal Party of Canada

Retired politicians

- Terry Cooke, former Hamilton-Wentworth Regional Chair and past President and CEO of the Hamilton Community Foundation
- Fred Eisenberger, Mayor of Hamilton (2006-2010, 2014-2022)
- Judy Marsales, Liberal MPP for Hamilton West (2003-2007)
- Catherine McKenna, Minister of Environment and Climate Change (2015-2019)

=== Opinion polls ===
Polling firm	Last date of polling (Note: Polls that share the same last date of polling are ordered from earliest (below) to latest 37 (above) first date of polling. Polls that have identical field dates are placed in the order in which they were released/published (earliest below, latest above).)	Link	Chad Collins	Rob Cooper	Scarlett Gillespie	Andrea Horwath	Keanin Loomis	Other	Undecided	Margin of error (Note: In cases when linked poll details distinguish between the margin of error associated with the total sample of respondents (including undecided and non-voters) and that of the subsample of decided/leaning voters, the former is included in the table. Also not included is the margin of error created by rounding to the nearest whole number or any margin of error from methodological sources. Most online polls (because of their opt-in method of recruiting panelists which results in a non-random sample) cannot have a margin of error. In such cases, shown is what the margin of error would be for a survey using a random probability-based sample of equivalent size.)	Sample size (Note: Refers to the total, "raw" sample size, including undecided and non-voters, and before demographic weighting is applied. Fractions in parentheses apply to rolling polls (see below) and indicate the proportion of the sample that is independent from the previous poll in the series.)	Polling method (Note: "Telephone" refers to traditional telephone polls conducted by live interviewers; "IVR" refers to automated Interactive Voice Response polls conducted by telephone; "online" refers to polls conducted exclusively over the internet; "telephone/online" refers to polls which combine results from both telephone and online surveys, or for which respondents are initially recruited by telephone and then asked to complete an online survey. "Rolling" polls contain overlapping data from one poll to the next.)	Lead
Keanin Loomis Campaign (Unofficial)	July 23, 2026		—N/a	22	9	24	38	—N/a	35	—N/a	921	—N/a	14
Liaison Strategies	October 23, 2025		9	—N/a	—N/a	33	38	2	17	±3.46 pp	800	IVR	6
2022 election	October 24, 2022		-	-	-	41.68	40.51	17.79	-	-	142,058	-	1.17

=== Results ===
2026 Hamilton, Ontario mayoral election
Candidate	Popular vote			Expenditures
Candidate	Votes	%	±%	Expenditures
Keanin Loomis	61,040	41.77	+1.36	
Rob Cooper	46,573	31.87		
Andrea Horwath (X)	21,223	14.52	−27.16	
Scarlett Gillespie	9,531	6.52		
Ejaz Butt	1,686	1.15	−0.19	
Sasha Austin	1,367	0.94		
David Harrison	1,295	0.89		
David Cherkewski	776	0.53		
Kevin Walker	600	0.41		
Pamela Mitchell	590	0.40		
Erin Janus	517	0.35		
Paul Fromm	503	0.34	−0.29	
Nathalie Xian Yi Yan	420	0.29		
Total valid votes	146,121	100.00		
Total rejected, unmarked and declined votes				
Turnout				
Eligible voters				
Note: Hamilton municipal elections are officially non-partisan. Candidate campaign colours are based on the prominent colour used in campaign materials and are used to visually differentiate candidates.
Sources: City of Hamilton, "Nominated Candidates"

== City council elections ==
=== Ward 1 - Chedoke-Cootes ===
Two-term incumbent councillor Maureen Wilson won re-election in 2022 with 74.96% of the vote. She announced her intention to run for a third and final term in October 2024. Wilson's campaign focused on re-investing in infrastructure, growing Hamilton's commercial and industrial tax base, and complete streets.

Nathan Savelli, a 39 year old youth worker registered to run after Hamilton City Council failed to pass an interim control by-law restricting the construction of data centres in Hamilton. Savelli campaigned on opposing data centres, supporting affordable housing, and addressing the city's growing infrastructure deficit.

Mark Powell, the spouse of animal rights activist Regan Russell, registered to run near the end of nominations. Powell's campaign focused on transparency, better communication with the public, and protecting the Chedoke Golf Course, a publicly-run golf club with two 18-hole courses.

Ray Paquette, who sought the office of Ward 1 councillor in 2010, registered to run but informed the CBC that he was not actively campaigning for the seat.

2026 Hamilton, Ontario municipal election: Ward 1 - Chedoke-Cootes
Candidate	Popular vote			Expenditures
Candidate	Votes	%	±%	Expenditures
Maureen Wilson (X)	3,847	41.83		
Nathan Savelli	3,718	40.43		
Mark Powell	1,456	15.83		
Raymond Paquette	175	1.90		
Total valid votes	9,196			
Total rejected, unmarked and declined votes				
Turnout				
Eligible voters				
Note: Candidate campaign colours are based on the prominent colour used in campaign items (signs, literature, etc.) and are used as a visual differentiation between candidates.
Sources: City of Hamilton, "Nominated Candidates"

=== Ward 2 - Downtown ===
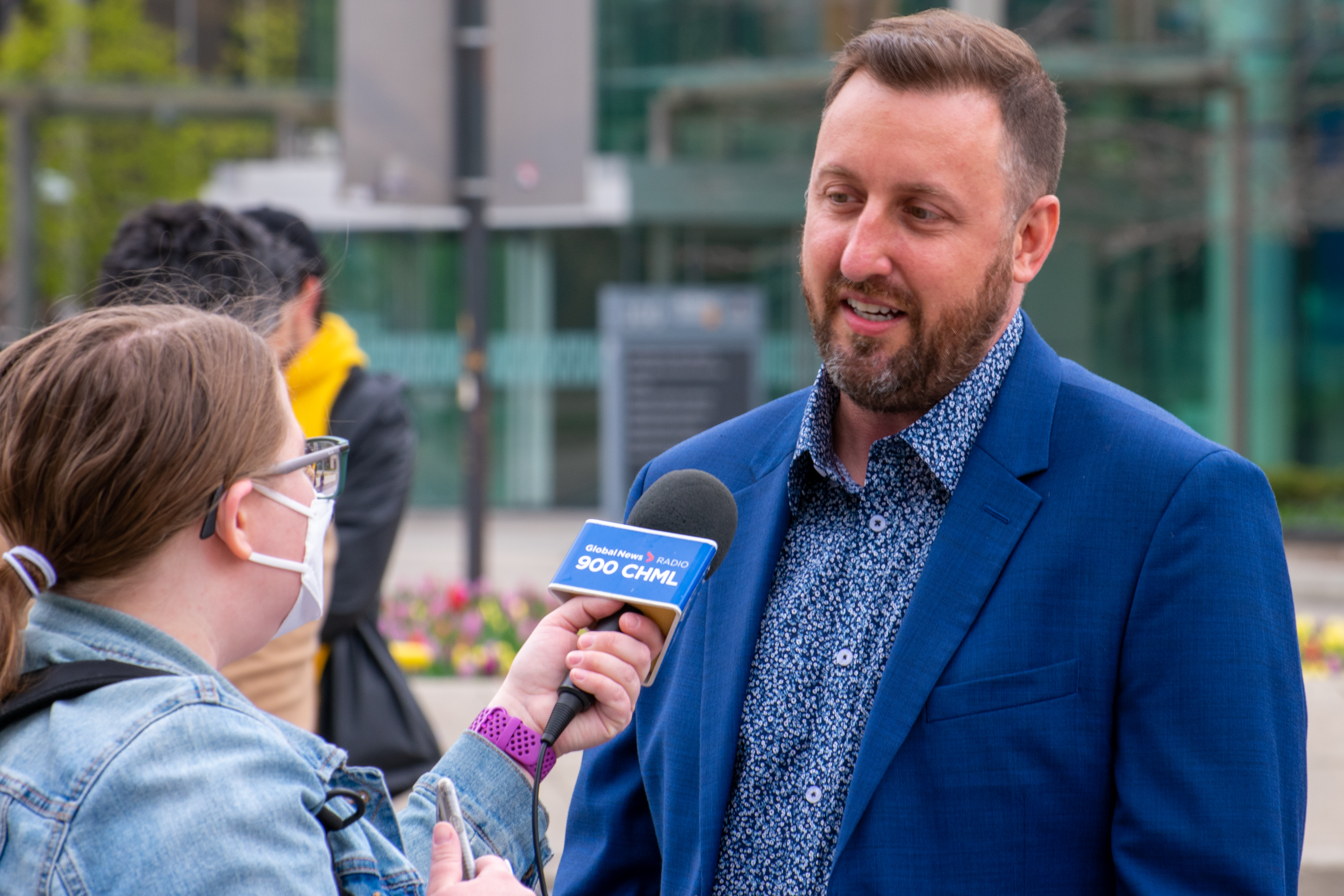
Kroetsch after registering in 2022

Incumbent councillor Cameron Kroetsch was elected in 2022 with 49.25% of the vote. He announced his intention to seek re-election in July 2025. On 24 May 2026, Kroetsch reaffirmed his intention to run for re-election on Bluesky, indicating he planned to register in early June and had avoided doing so to focus on legislation prior to a 31 August deadline for sitting councillors to submit motions. Kroetsch registered for re-election on June 2, 2026. His campaign focused on safety improvements downtown, pushing the province to provide better mental health supports, and providing assistance to community groups doing work in the city.

Local social media personality Daniel Myles announced his intention to seek the Ward 2 council seat on his Instagram page in 2025. Myles has found online fame posting videos captured from his home surveillance cameras in Hamilton's Central Neighbourhood. Myles falsely claimed that his attempt to prematurely solicit campaign donations through GoFundMe was stopped because of political interference from the incumbent councillor. This followed the City of Hamilton's elections office informing him the fundraiser violated election laws.

In November 2025, Kroetsch posted a lengthy thread on the social media site Bluesky reflecting on the threats, violence, and bullying he has experienced since taking office. The thread drew attention to Myles' history of making homophobic and misogynistic comments and targeting community members with differing political viewpoints. Myles later told CHCH News that he stood by his use of a homophobic slur, telling a reporter, "I can say whatever I want whenever I want to."

During the summer of 2026, Myles faced questions from local media about his possible criminal history. A Hamilton resident named "Daniel Myles" was convicted of criminal harassment in 2016 after sending intimate photos of a woman to her son, with a judge saying he was "predatory, lacks empathy for his victims, lacks insight into his offending behaviour". Arrest warrants in relation to 33 criminal charges were also issued for a "Daniel Myles" in Woodstock, New Brunswick in the 1990's. After a Hamilton Spectator investigation found that Myles had the same name and birthdate as the individuals in the criminal cases, as well as connections to Woodstock, the paper contacted Myles, who declined to comment. Myles withdrew from the race on August 18, 2026, citing "personal safety" reasons for his withdrawal.

On April 15, 2026, North End resident and activist Kelly Oucharek announced her candidacy for Ward 2 councillor. Oucharek became a leading opponent of a proposal by local faith-based groups to construct a tiny home village for people experiencing homelessness in the North End neighbourhood. Oucharek is a vocal critic of Kroetsch, frequently delegating to City Council and commenting to local media regarding issues in the community. Oucharek's campaign focused on the addictions crisis, public safety, and improving collaboration at city hall.

Brian Lewis, a Ward 14 resident who sought the West Mountain councillor's seat in 2022, registered to run on 21 May 2026. Lewis identifies as Métis and served on municipal committees in the past. Lewis's campaign focused on tackling violent crime, improving housing affordability, and consulting the community before making decisions on the municipal budget.

Tony Sciara, a residential care home operator, ran on a campaign pledging to strengthen relationships between city hall and the Hamilton Police Service and finding "practical solutions" to the homelessness, addictions, and safety concerns of residents. Bernard Tompkins, a real estate agent and tradesperson, similarly campaigned on addressing homelessness, addictions, and safety. Auditor Rodney Elesie ran on a similar platform.

Eisham Abdulkarim, a career public servant and former Vice-Chair of Hamilton’s Immigrants and Refugee Advisory Committee, campaigned on a platform aimed toward addressing transparency, community wellbeing, mental health & substance use, reliable transit, housing and affordability. Abulkarim’s proposed initiatives included improved co-ordination between public services to treat community concerns, quarterly progress reports, and open dialogue between constituents and elected officials through a “community round-table”.

Daniel Greene, a non-denominational minister known for dressing as Darth Vader and the Joker during local festivals, campaigned on a platform of building non-profit housing, repaving roads, and opposing the outsourcing of street and sidewalk clearing.

Candidate Bill Houston did not interact with local media during the campaign.

2026 Hamilton, Ontario municipal election: Ward 2 - Downtown
Candidate	Popular vote			Expenditures
Candidate	Votes	%	±%	Expenditures
Cameron Kroetsch (X)	3,645	46.96		
Kelly Oucharek	2,100	27.05		
Tony Sciara	504	6.49		
Eisham Abdulkarim	446	5.75		
Brian Lewis	429	5.59		
Bernard Tompkins	220	2.83		
Daniel Greene	173	2.23		
Bill Houston	133	1.71		
Rodney Elesie	112	1.44		
Total valid votes	7,762			
Total rejected, unmarked and declined votes				
Turnout				
Eligible voters				
Note: Candidate campaign colours are based on the prominent colour used in campaign items (signs, literature, etc.) and are used as a visual differentiation between candidates.
Sources: City of Hamilton, "Nominated Candidates"

=== Ward 3 - Hamilton Centre ===
Two-term incumbent councillor Nrinder Nann was re-elected in 2022 with 50.33% of the vote. She declared her intention to run for re-election in January 2026. Nann's campaign focused on addressing the housing and homelessness crisis by working with other levels of government, addressing infrastructure maintenance, ensuring street sweeping happens after garbage pickup days, piloting a "Community Crisis Response" program to address crime and drug use, and pressure the provincial government to set better emissions standards for industry.

Quantitative data analyst and activist Andrew Selman announced his intention to seek the Ward 3 council seat in a June 2025 interview with The Hamilton Spectator. Selman is a frequent delegate to Hamilton City Council, focusing on issues of transparency, city spending, and homeless encampments. Selman gained national media attention for his opposition to the makeshift communities and made local news in May 2024 after rescuing a family from an apartment fire. Selman campaigned on opposing tax increases, launching a "Truth in Budgeting" initiative, supporting an "Equitable Recreation Strategy" to bring recreation investment into downtown, tackling urban blight, and promoting the demolition of abandoned buildings in the community.

Stipley resident Graham Schreiber announced a bid for Ward 3 councillor on Facebook in July 2025. In his posts regarding his candidacy, he has expressed opposition to the city's homeless population and to the proposed LRT project while indicating support for Real Estate Investment Trusts and the involuntary incarceration of people with addictions. His posts also indicate support for President Donald Trump and include anti-Islam, anti-Indigenous, anti-immigrant, transphobic, and homophobic comments. He officially registered his candidacy on May 4, 2026. Schreiber campaigned on forcing property owners to better manage their buildings and supporting gentrification, which he told the CBC was "an unpleasant works [sic] amongst the radical left." Schreiber was challenged by other candidates for saying "people in drag should not be parading around the streets and having their little freak shows with the exposure to children" during a local all-candidates debate.

On February 19, 2026, Christine Cayuga, a local business owner, announced her intention to run for the Ward 3 council seat. Cayuga indicated she would be running on a platform that prioritizes affordability and opposes tax increases. She officially registered her candidacy on May 4, 2026.

On May 15, 2026, Kristeen Sprague registered her candidacy. Sprague won 120 votes in 2018. She did not submit official financial statements and was ineligible to run in 2022.

Local maintenance worker and union representative Christopher De Melo ran on a campaign of bringing together agencies that help people experiencing homelessness and supporting a housing-first approach to addressing the issue.

Wade Campbell, the owner of a laundromat in the ward, campaigned on supporting the police and having stricter penalties for public drug use and violence.

2026 Hamilton, Ontario municipal election: Ward 3 - Hamilton Centre
Candidate	Popular vote			Expenditures
Candidate	Votes	%	±%	Expenditures
Nrinder Nann (X)	4,448	54.16		
Andrew Selman	1,782	21.70		
Christopher DeMelo	615	7.49		
Christine Cayuga	541	6.59		
Wade Campbell	519	6.32		
Graham Schreiber	178	2.17		
Kristeen Sprague	130	1.58		
Total valid votes	8,213			
Total rejected, unmarked and declined votes				
Turnout				
Eligible voters				
Note: Candidate campaign colours are based on the prominent colour used in campaign items (signs, literature, etc.) and are used as a visual differentiation between candidates.
Sources: City of Hamilton, "Nominated Candidates"

=== Ward 4 - Hamilton East ===
Incumbent councillor Tammy Hwang won the 2022 election with 23% of the vote. She announced she would seek re-election in July 2025. Hwang's campaign focused on the city's infrastructure deficit, promoting small business, and addressing social complexity in the community, including housing affordability, food insecurity, and the opioid crisis.

In August 2025, Hwang alerted the community to a flyer being circulated by Hayden Lawrence, a staffer for Conservative Party of Canada Hamilton East-Stoney Creek MP Ned Kuruc. Lawrence previously sought the office of councillor for the Merriton ward in St. Catharines in 2018 and was the 2025 Conservative candidate for MP in Hamilton Centre. In the letter, Hwang suggested that Lawrence was distributing the letter in anticipation of running for the Ward 4 council seat in 2026. Lawrence did not register to run in the election.

In June 2025, former Ward 2 councillor and 2022 Ontario Liberal Party candidate in Hamilton East—Stoney Creek Jason Farr told the Hamilton Spectator that he was considering a bid for the Ward 2 seat. In late April 2026, Farr surprised observers by announcing he would, instead, seek the Ward 4 council seat. Local journalist Joey Coleman noted that Farr, a resident of Ward 3, had been working as a consultant lobbyist since losing his seat in 2022. Farr campaigned on opposing AI data centres, dealing with industrial fallout, and launching "Kenfest" to promote private investment in the ward, pitching himself as the successor to former Ward 4 councillor Sam Merulla and as a person with previous working relationships with other members of council.

Tobin Tuff, an entrepreneur and daycare operator, campaigned on opposing AI data centres, supporting small business during LRT construction, and strengthening local commercial corridors. Tuff indicated he would support a moratorium on AI data centres and providing better housing options in commercial areas to stop the conversion of storefronts to apartments.

Jemma Lambert, a candidate for Oshawa Regional Councillor for Ward 3 in 2022, identified as a disability justice activist who worked to combat "Canadian eugenics, white supremacy, colonialism, and capitalism." Lambert campaigned on opposing AI data centres, stopping the commodification of housing, building medium density housing, and providing no-barrier permanent social housing for people experiencing homelessness.

Local contractor and landlord Todd Anderson campaigned on dealing with the issues of homelessness, drugs, and crime, pledging to work closely with the police. Tony Mamone, also a contractor, campaigned on keeping tax increases under the rate of inflation, improving roads, and strengthening neighbourhood-level services.

2026 Hamilton, Ontario municipal election: Ward 4 - Hamilton East
Candidate	Popular vote			Expenditures
Candidate	Votes	%	±%	Expenditures
Jason Farr	3,468	39.30	-	
Tammy Hwang (X)	2,868	32.50	-	
Todd Anderson	1,083	12.27		
Tony Mamone	765	8.67		
Jemma Lambert	356	4.03		
Tobin Tuff	285	3.23		
Total valid votes	8,825			
Total rejected, unmarked and declined votes				
Turnout				
Eligible voters				
Note: Candidate campaign colours are based on the prominent colour used in campaign items (signs, literature, etc.) and are used as a visual differentiation between candidates.
Sources: City of Hamilton, "Nominated Candidates"

=== Ward 5 - Red Hill ===
Incumbent councillor Matt Francis won the 2022 election with 43.61% of the vote. He announced he would be running for re-election in January 2026. Francis worked on the campaign for former Liberal MP Chad Collins during the 2021 Canadian federal election. Francis's campaign focused on capping taxes to the rate of inflation, cutting municipal spending on bike lanes and "tiny home" projects for people experiencing homelessness, and overturning a mayoral decision to build 67 units of affordable housing on the site of a current parking lot in downtown Stoney Creek.

Juanita Maldonado, a former constituency assistant for MP Wayne Marston who previously ran for Ward 5 councillor in 2018 and was the 2007 Ontario NDP candidate for provincial parliament in Ancaster—Dundas—Flamborough—Westdale, registered to run near the end of the nomination period. Maldonado's campaign focused on job creation, economic development, increasing arts funding, and paying municipal workers a living wage.

Candidate Ahmad Khan did not interact with the media during the campaign.

2026 Hamilton, Ontario municipal election: Ward 5 - Red Hill
Candidate	Popular vote			Expenditures
Candidate	Votes	%	±%	Expenditures
Matt Francis (X)	7,588	84.43		
Juanita Maldonado	1,165	12.96		
Ahmad Khan	234	2.60		
Total valid votes	8,987			
Total rejected, unmarked and declined votes				
Turnout				
Eligible voters				
Note: Candidate campaign colours are based on the prominent colour used in campaign items (signs, literature, etc.) and are used as a visual differentiation between candidates.
Sources: City of Hamilton, "Nominated Candidates"

=== Ward 6 - East Mountain ===
Eleven-term incumbent councillor Tom Jackson won the 2022 election with 63.45% of the vote. Jackson announced he would be seeking a twelfth term in May 2026. Jackson campaigned on improving the city's infrastructure, making streets safer, and addressing affordability concerns.

Peter Werhun, a lawyer who was the NDP's candidate for parliament in the riding of Flamborough—Glanbrook—Brant North in the 2025 Federal Election, also registered to seek the seat. Werhun's campaign focused on making city hall accountable to residents, expanding access to affordable housing, and ending delays when it comes to municipal projects.

Local hairstylist Melissa Debicki ran on a platform of expanding childcare offerings in Ward 6, supporting seniors, ensuring residents have better access to healthcare facilities, supporting local business, and bringing more of city hall's services "in-house", as opposed to contracting them out.

2026 Hamilton, Ontario municipal election: Ward 6 - East Mountain
Candidate	Popular vote			Expenditures
Candidate	Votes	%	±%	Expenditures
Tom Jackson (X)	7,189	72.13		
Peter Werhun	1,590	15.95		
Melissa Debicki	1,188	11.92		
Total valid votes	9,967			
Total rejected, unmarked and declined votes				
Turnout				
Eligible voters				
Note: Candidate campaign colours are based on the prominent colour used in campaign items (signs, literature, etc.) and are used as a visual differentiation between candidates.
Sources: City of Hamilton, "Nominated Candidates"

=== Ward 7 - Central Mountain ===
Incumbent councillor Esther Pauls won re-election in 2022 with 50.91% of the vote. Despite early indications Pauls would not seek a third term, she announced her intention to run for re-election in January 2026. Pauls was the former Progressive Conservative Party of Ontario candidate on Hamilton Mountain in the 2018 Ontario provincial election. Pauls campaigned on changing the municipal budget to focus more on road improvements, supporting new housing developments in the suburban portions of the ward, and pushing for better rules on e-scooters.

Local learning and development specialist Heather Beale registered to contest the seat. Beale campaigned on ensuring more housing is built across Hamilton, working to better coordinate mental health and housing services with the province and federal government, and prioritizing road and infrastructure repairs.

Retired Hamilton-Wentworth Catholic District School Board principal Mark Daly also sought the seat. Daly's campaign promised spending controls, road improvements, better service standards, and capping tax increases to the rate of inflation. Bus driver and security guard Gordon Leslie pledged to lower taxes, fill potholes, and oppose the powers granted to the mayor by the Strong Mayors, Building Homes Act.

2026 Hamilton, Ontario municipal election: Ward 7 - Central Mountain
Candidate	Popular vote			Expenditures
Candidate	Votes	%	±%	Expenditures
Mark Daly	4,943	42.18		
Esther Pauls (X)	4,432	37.82		
Heather Beale	2,047	17.47		
Gordon Leslie	298	2.54		
Total valid votes	11,720			
Total rejected, unmarked and declined votes				
Turnout				
Eligible voters				
Note: Candidate campaign colours are based on the prominent colour used in campaign items (signs, literature, etc.) and are used as a visual differentiation between candidates.
Sources: City of Hamilton, "Nominated Candidates"

=== Ward 8 - West/Central Mountain ===
Incumbent councillor Rob Cooper won the 2025 by-election with 19.6% of the vote. In January 2026, Cooper told the Hamilton Spectator's Scott Radley that he was considering a mayoral bid due to his frustration with Mayor Horwath's handling of the 2026 budget. Cooper confirmed he intended to run for mayor in March 2026.

In early April, 2026, Ward 7 Hamilton-Wentworth District School Board trustee and 2025 Ontario Liberal Party candidate for MPP on Hamilton Mountain, Dawn Danko announced her intention to seek the Ward 8 council seat. Danko's husband, John-Paul Danko, previously served as the Ward 8 councillor before being elected the federal MP for Hamilton West-Ancaster-Dundas. Danko indicated her campaign would focus on responsible spending and reliable delivery of public services. She registered on May 15, 2026. Danko campaigned on a platform that pledged to improve traffic safety and road conditions, address affordability concerns, and find compassionate ways to deal with homelessness, addictions, and mental health issues.

On May 1, 2026, Jacob ten Brinke, the president of the Hamilton Mountain Conservative Party of Canada electoral district association, registered to run. ten Brinke's priorities included affordability, safe streets, and pledge to cap property tax increases to the rate of inflation.

Former Ward 14 councillor Terry Whitehead registered on the last day of nominations. Whitehead also sought the seat during the 2025 by-election, placing second with 17.8% of the vote. Whitehead had previously been the subject of controversy, having been found by the city's Integrity Commissioner of bullying and harassing city staff during his tenure on council. Whitehead's 2026 campaign focused heavily on law-and-order, referencing "home invasions, car thefts, violent crime, [and] drugs and needles in our parks", despite evidence violent crime in Hamilton was in decline. Whitehead also campaigned on lowering taxes, cleaning up parks, and improving road safety.

Adlan Taramov, a local immigration consultant, registered to run near the end of nominations. Tamarov came to Canada as a refugee in 2004 and has lived in the city since 2015. His campaign focused on better public transit, improved road conditions, traffic calming, keeping any property tax increases to the rate of inflation, and prioritizing gentle density over large new apartment developments.

Small business owner Pat Piro ran on a platform of addressing the homelessness crisis, attracting high-paying jobs, and dealing with the city's LRT construction. Chiropractor Nenos Damerchie campaigned on improving road conditions, traffic congestion, reducing delays at city hall, working closely with the Hamilton Police Service, and improving affordability for residents.

2026 Hamilton, Ontario municipal election: Ward 8 - West/Central Mountain
Candidate	Popular vote			Expenditures
Candidate	Votes	%	±%	Expenditures
Dawn Danko	3,945	43.64		
Terry Whitehead	2,173	24.04		
Jacob Tenbrinke	1,630	18.03		
Adlan Taramov	570	6.31		
Nenos Damerchie	326	3.61		
Pat Piro	198	2.19		
Jonathan Morris	197	2.19		
Total valid votes	9,039			
Total rejected, unmarked and declined votes				
Turnout				
Eligible voters				
Note: Candidate campaign colours are based on the prominent colour used in campaign items (signs, literature, etc.) and are used as a visual differentiation between candidates.
Sources: City of Hamilton, "Nominated Candidates"

=== Ward 9 - Upper Stoney Creek ===
Incumbent councillor Brad Clark won re-election in 2022 with 51.56% of the vote. He announced his intention to run for a fifth term in January 2026. He registered on May 15, 2026. Clark's campaign focused on his experience, finding a solution to odor issues around a GFL Landfill on Green Mountain Road, and getting tough-on-crime.

Abhijeet Gill, a real estate broker living in the Felker neighbourhood, registered on May 6. Gill campaigned on improving public safety, addressing affordability concerns, and improving local infrastructure.

Brad Stapleton, a former police officer, ran on a campaign of lowering taxes, improving road safety, and addressing the GFL Landfill controversy.

On May 8, Jonathan Stathakos, a Brock University employee and activist with both the federal Conservative Party and provincial Progressive Conservatives, registered to run for Ward 9 councillor. Stathakos, who served as manager for Ned Kuruc's campaign in Hamilton East–Stoney Creek and as MPP Donna Skelly's deputy campaign manager in 2025, announced a campaign platform that focused on lower taxes, more police presence in Stoney Creek, and widening local highways. Jonathan Stathakos was endorsed by former Ward 9 Councillor Doug Conley and former Hamilton Mayor Bob Bratina.

Eileen Walker, a former Justice of the peace and the Ontario Liberal Party candidate for MPP in Hamilton Centre in 2025, filed in July. Walker campaigned on improving local roads, focusing on infrastructure concerns, and improving maintenance of local assets.

2026 Hamilton, Ontario municipal election: Ward 9 - Upper Stoney Creek
Candidate	Popular vote			Expenditures
Candidate	Votes	%	±%	Expenditures
Jonathan Stathakos	3,531	39.10		
Brad Clark (X)	3,329	36.86		
Abhijeet Gill	872	9.66		
Eileen Walker	864	9.57		
Brad Stapleton	435	4.82		
Total valid votes	9,031			
Total rejected, unmarked and declined votes				
Turnout				
Eligible voters				
Note: Candidate campaign colours are based on the prominent colour used in campaign items (signs, literature, etc.) and are used as a visual differentiation between candidates.
Sources: City of Hamilton, "Nominated Candidates"

=== Ward 10 - Lower Stoney Creek ===
Incumbent councillor Jeff Beattie won the 2022 election with 39.69% of the vote. He announced his intention to seek re-election in January 2026. After Hamilton East-Stoney Creek MPP Neil Lumsden announced his retirement in late July 2026, the Ontario Progressive Conservative Party named Beattie as their candidate in the by-election and he withdrew from the municipal election. Beattie was elected to the provincial legislature on September 3, 2026.

Cal DiFalco, a retired provincial civil servant and local writer, registered to seek the vacant seat. DiFalco, who served as chair of the Stoney Creek Urban Expansion Advisory Committee, campaigned on responsible growth, more community input for development, and better investment in local infrastructure.

Eugene Farago, an IT consultant and president of the Stoney Creek Sabres youth hockey association, ran on a platform of updating the City of Hamilton's Official Plan to better address development concerns.

Consultant and business owner Olivia Fung campaigned on better managing growth and preparing the city for LRT construction.

Sam Gamble, a high school teacher and volunteer firefighter, focused on timely infrastructure repairs, keeping taxes at the rate of inflation, increasing police presence in Stoney Creek, and providing more opportunities for youth in the area.

Akash Grewal, a local mortgage broker and the 2018 Ontario Progressive Conservative candidate in Hamilton East-Stoney Creek, ran on a platform of supporting the police, fixing local infrastructure, and better managing municipal spending.

Michael T. Loomans, a local perennial candidate, had previously registered to run in Ward 9, but switched following Beattie's withdrawal. Loomans campaigned on better amenities in new developments, more public transit, and more responsiveness to local concerns.

Labour lawyer and college instructor Ivan Luksic focused his campaign on respect for taxpayers, reducing the number of managers at city hall, ending projects like the city's tiny shelter program for people experiencing homelessness, building new community centres, and hiring more by-law officers.

Small business owner Tanjoban Nijjar ran on a platform of better public transit, improved local response to development concerns, better road maintenance, and municipal spending caps.

Real estate agent Larry Paletta campaigned on having more business-minded people on council, better preparing the area for urban expansion, and prioritizing Ward 10 issues at city hall.

Retiree and local soccer coach Vince Rigitano ran on a platform of making Ward 10 safer, investing in roads, and improving the local quality of life.

Nicole Trombetta, a business development strategist and co-founder of country music festival "Boots in the Creek", campaigned to make streets safer for residents, capping property taxes to the rate of inflation, and having more local say in development approvals.

2026 Hamilton, Ontario municipal election: Ward 10 - Lower Stoney Creek
Candidate	Popular vote			Expenditures
Candidate	Votes	%	±%	Expenditures
Nicole Trombetta	3,052	28.56		
Ivan Luksic	2,996	28.05		
Cal DiFalco	1,592	14.91		
Vince Rigitano	535	5.01		
Akash Grewal	521	4.88		
Tanjoban Nijjar	468	4.38		
Larry Paletta	446	4.18		
Eugene Farago	414	3.88		
Sam Gamble	262	2.45		
Olivia Fung	254	2.38		
Michael T. Loomans	140	1.31		
Total valid votes	10,680			
Total rejected, unmarked and declined votes				
Turnout				
Eligible voters				
Note: Candidate campaign colours are based on the prominent colour used in campaign items (signs, literature, etc.) and are used as a visual differentiation between candidates.
Sources: City of Hamilton, "Nominated Candidates"

=== Ward 11 - Glanbrook ===
Incumbent councillor Mark Tadeson won the 2022 election with 37.99% of the vote. He announced he would be seeking re-election in January 2026. Tadeson told the CBC that he had become much more knowledgeable about municipal affairs during his first term and that his campaign would focus on managing the city's expanding urban boundary, traffic calming on rural roads, and improving local recreation facilities.

Candidates Damon Mombourquette and Aaron Post did not interact with local media during the campaign. Notably, both candidates skipped the ward's only televised debate, leaving Tadeson alone to field questions from the media.

2026 Hamilton, Ontario municipal election: Ward 11 - Glanbrook
Candidate	Popular vote			Expenditures
Candidate	Votes	%	±%	Expenditures
Mark Tadeson (X)	6,601	81.95		
Damon Mombourquette	867	10.76		
Aaron Post	587	7.29		
Total valid votes	8,055			
Total rejected, unmarked and declined votes				
Turnout				
Eligible voters				
Note: Candidate campaign colours are based on the prominent colour used in campaign items (signs, literature, etc.) and are used as a visual differentiation between candidates.
Sources: City of Hamilton, "Nominated Candidates"

=== Ward 12 - Ancaster ===
Incumbent councillor Craig Cassar won the 2022 election with 38.80% of the vote. He told CBC Hamilton he would seek a second term in January 2026. He registered for re-election on June 30. Cassar ran on making streets safer, protecting farmland, providing value for tax dollars, and his experience in the role, telling the CBC "Be wary of someone who tells you they will bring 'common sense' to the job. The more complex something is, the less 'common' the sense is required to be effective."

In early 2026, Fred Bennink, the Ontario Progressive Conservative candidate for MPP in Hamilton West—Ancaster—Dundas launched a "concerned citizen" website which resembled a campaign website. This led to speculation that Bennink intended to run for the Ward 12 council seat. Bennink registered to run for the seat on the opening day of nominations. Bennink's campaign focused on lowering taxes, improving infrastructure, law-and-order, and opposing the city's proposed stormwater fee for rural properties intended to cover the rising costs of infrastructure.

2026 Hamilton, Ontario municipal election: Ward 12 - Ancaster
Candidate	Popular vote			Expenditures
Candidate	Votes	%	±%	Expenditures
Fred Bennink	8,009	58.40		
Craig Cassar (X)	5,705	41.60		
Total valid votes	13,714			
Total rejected, unmarked and declined votes				
Turnout				
Eligible voters				
Note: Candidate campaign colours are based on the prominent colour used in campaign items (signs, literature, etc.) and are used as a visual differentiation between candidates.
Sources: City of Hamilton, "Nominated Candidates"

=== Ward 13 - Dundas ===
Incumbent councillor Alex Wilson won the 2022 election with 57.94% of the vote. Wilson announced via their Ward 13 community newsletter on May 1, 2026 that they had made the "difficult decision" not to seek re-election, pointing to both accomplishments during their term and ongoing concerns about provincial interference in municipal governance.

Loren Lieberman, a local political activist who worked on the campaigns of Jason Farr and Vito Sgro, told the Hamilton Spectator he would be seeking the Ward 13 council seat in 2026. Lieberman's campaign focused on lowering municipal property taxes, training city staff to understand rural issues, and focusing on the concerns of Ward 13.

In March 2026, Rick Kunc, a retired school principal at the private Hillfield Strathallan College, announced his intention to run for the Ward 13 seat, stating he wished to give back to the community. Kunc campaigned on better maintaining rural assets, improving infrastructure in downtown Dundas, and being a responsive councillor when it comes to Ward 13's issues.

Spencer Naylor, a policy advisor with Ontario's Ministry of Health and former vice-president of the McMaster University Graduate Student Association, registered to seek the open seat. Naylor's campaign focused on stopping urban sprawl, opposing AI data centres, improving housing affordability, and focusing on "missing middle" developments.

Retired contractor Gary Aikema registered near the end of nominations. Aikema's campaign focused on rural road safety, fiscal accountability, and reopening Safari Road in rural Flamborough.

2026 Hamilton, Ontario municipal election: Ward 13 - Dundas
Candidate	Popular vote			Expenditures
Candidate	Votes	%	±%	Expenditures
Rick Kunc	7,335	60.66		
Loren Lieberman	1,966	16.26		
Spencer Naylor	1,964	16.24		
Gary Aikema	827	6.84		
Total valid votes	12,092			
Total rejected, unmarked and declined votes				
Turnout				
Eligible voters				
Note: Candidate campaign colours are based on the prominent colour used in campaign items (signs, literature, etc.) and are used as a visual differentiation between candidates.
Sources: City of Hamilton, "Nominated Candidates"

=== Ward 14 - West Mountain ===
Incumbent councillor Mike Spadafora won the 2022 election with 28.48% of the vote. While Spadafora's name was floated as a potential mayoral candidate, he announced his intention to run for re-election in January 2026.

Kojo Damptey, the runner-up for this seat in 2022, filed his nomination papers in May. Damptey, a part-time instructor at McMaster University, was also the Ontario NDP candidate for MPP in Hamilton Mountain in 2025.

2026 Hamilton, Ontario municipal election: Ward 14 - West Mountain
Candidate	Popular vote			Expenditures
Candidate	Votes	%	±%	Expenditures
Michael Spadafora (X)	6,310	67.06	-	
Kojo Damptey	3,099	32.94		
Total valid votes	9,409			
Total rejected, unmarked and declined votes				
Turnout				
Eligible voters				
Note: Candidate campaign colours are based on the prominent colour used in campaign items (signs, literature, etc.) and are used as a visual differentiation between candidates.
Sources: City of Hamilton, "Nominated Candidates"

=== Ward 15 - Flamborough ===
Incumbent councillor Ted McMeekin won the 2022 election with 43.83% of the vote. McMeekin, who has been involved in politics since the 1970's, told CBC Hamilton in January 2026 that he would take time to consult with his family over his political future and make a decision closer to the August 21 deadline for registration. McMeekin registered in late June.

2026 Hamilton, Ontario municipal election: Ward 15 - Flamborough
Candidate	Popular vote			Expenditures
Candidate	Votes	%	±%	Expenditures
Colleen Stewart	4,081	47.78		
Ted McMeekin (X)	2,660	31.14	-	
Jeff Yaeger	707	8.28		
Zac Wrobel	503	5.89		
Chase Alford	411	4.81		
Mary Kovacs	179	2.10		
Total valid votes	8,541			
Total rejected, unmarked and declined votes				
Turnout				
Eligible voters				
Note: Candidate campaign colours are based on the prominent colour used in campaign items (signs, literature, etc.) and are used as a visual differentiation between candidates.
Sources: City of Hamilton, "Nominated Candidates"

== Public school board trustee elections ==
=== Ward 1 ===
2026 Hamilton, Ontario municipal election: Ward 1 HWDSB trustee
Candidate	Popular vote			Expenditures
Candidate	Votes	%	±%	Expenditures
Cameron Prosic	3,262	48.48%		
Andrew Harrington	1,312	19.50%		
Blake Hambly	1,205	17.91%		
Shawn McMullin	950	14.12%		
Total valid votes	6,729			
Total rejected, unmarked and declined votes				
Turnout				
Eligible voters				
Note: Candidate campaign colours are based on the prominent colour used in campaign items (signs, literature, etc.) and are used as a visual differentiation between candidates.
Sources: City of Hamilton, "Nominated Candidates", HWDSB Trustee

=== Ward 2 ===
2026 Hamilton, Ontario municipal election: Ward 2 HWDSB trustee
Candidate	Popular vote			Expenditures
Candidate	Votes	%	±%	Expenditures
Anthony Chepil				
Sabreina Dahab (incumbent)				
Total valid votes				
Total rejected, unmarked and declined votes				
Turnout				
Eligible voters				
Note: Candidate campaign colours are based on the prominent colour used in campaign items (signs, literature, etc.) and are used as a visual differentiation between candidates.
Sources: City of Hamilton, "Nominated Candidates"

=== Ward 3 ===
2026 Hamilton, Ontario municipal election: Ward 3 HWDSB trustee
Candidate	Popular vote			Expenditures
Candidate	Votes	%	±%	Expenditures
Frank Crowder				
Larry Pattison				
Kory Preston				
Meagan Shanahan				
Total valid votes				
Total rejected, unmarked and declined votes				
Turnout				
Eligible voters				
Note: Candidate campaign colours are based on the prominent colour used in campaign items (signs, literature, etc.) and are used as a visual differentiation between candidates.
Sources: City of Hamilton, "Nominated Candidates"

=== Ward 4 ===
2026 Hamilton, Ontario municipal election: Ward 4 HWDSB trustee
Candidate	Popular vote			Expenditures
Candidate	Votes	%	±%	Expenditures
Abby Zaitley (incumbent)	Acclaimed			
Total valid votes				
Total rejected, unmarked and declined votes				
Turnout				
Eligible voters				
Note: Candidate campaign colours are based on the prominent colour used in campaign items (signs, literature, etc.) and are used as a visual differentiation between candidates.
Sources: City of Hamilton, "Nominated Candidates"

=== Ward 5 & 10 ===
2026 Hamilton, Ontario municipal election: Ward 5 & 10 HWDSB trustee
Candidate	Popular vote			Expenditures
Candidate	Votes	%	±%	Expenditures
Theresa Maguire-Garber				
Logan Shields				
Todd White (incumbent)				
Total valid votes				
Total rejected, unmarked and declined votes				
Turnout				
Eligible voters				
Note: Candidate campaign colours are based on the prominent colour used in campaign items (signs, literature, etc.) and are used as a visual differentiation between candidates.
Sources: City of Hamilton, "Nominated Candidates"

=== Ward 6 & 9 ===
2026 Hamilton, Ontario municipal election: Ward 6 & 9 HWDSB trustee
Candidate	Popular vote			Expenditures
Candidate	Votes	%	±%	Expenditures
Kathy Archer (incumbent)				
Todd May				
Total valid votes				
Total rejected, unmarked and declined votes				
Turnout				
Eligible voters				
Note: Candidate campaign colours are based on the prominent colour used in campaign items (signs, literature, etc.) and are used as a visual differentiation between candidates.
Sources: City of Hamilton, "Nominated Candidates"

=== Ward 7 ===
2026 Hamilton, Ontario municipal election: Ward 7 HWDSB trustee
Candidate	Popular vote			Expenditures
Candidate	Votes	%	±%	Expenditures
Seth Floyd				
Bill King				
Marlon Picken				
Total valid votes				
Total rejected, unmarked and declined votes				
Turnout				
Eligible voters				
Note: Candidate campaign colours are based on the prominent colour used in campaign items (signs, literature, etc.) and are used as a visual differentiation between candidates.
Sources: City of Hamilton, "Nominated Candidates"

=== Ward 8 & 14 ===
2026 Hamilton, Ontario municipal election: Ward 8 & 14 HWDSB trustee
Candidate	Popular vote			Expenditures
Candidate	Votes	%	±%	Expenditures
Daunte Hillen				
Ben O'Reilly				
Bryan Johnson				
Total valid votes				
Total rejected, unmarked and declined votes				
Turnout				
Eligible voters				
Note: Candidate campaign colours are based on the prominent colour used in campaign items (signs, literature, etc.) and are used as a visual differentiation between candidates.
Sources: City of Hamilton, "Nominated Candidates"

=== Ward 11 & 12 ===
2026 Hamilton, Ontario municipal election: Ward 4 HWDSB trustee
Candidate	Popular vote			Expenditures
Candidate	Votes	%	±%	Expenditures
Melissa Baxter				
Amanda Fehrman (incumbent)				
Total valid votes				
Total rejected, unmarked and declined votes				
Turnout				
Eligible voters				
Note: Candidate campaign colours are based on the prominent colour used in campaign items (signs, literature, etc.) and are used as a visual differentiation between candidates.
Sources: City of Hamilton, "Nominated Candidates"

=== Ward 13 ===
2026 Hamilton, Ontario municipal election: Ward 13 HWDSB trustee
Candidate	Popular vote			Expenditures
Candidate	Votes	%	±%	Expenditures
Chris Slye	Acclaimed			
Total valid votes				
Total rejected, unmarked and declined votes				
Turnout				
Eligible voters				
Note: Candidate campaign colours are based on the prominent colour used in campaign items (signs, literature, etc.) and are used as a visual differentiation between candidates.
Sources: City of Hamilton, "Nominated Candidates"

=== Ward 15 ===
Incumbent trustee Graeme Noble registered to run for re-election on May 25, 2026. Noble was first elected in 2022 with 53.04% of the vote.

2026 Hamilton, Ontario municipal election: Ward 15 HWDSB trustee
Candidate	Popular vote			Expenditures
Candidate	Votes	%	±%	Expenditures
Anthony Nicholl				
Graeme Noble (incumbent)				
Total valid votes				
Total rejected, unmarked and declined votes				
Turnout				
Eligible voters				
Note: Candidate campaign colours are based on the prominent colour used in campaign items (signs, literature, etc.) and are used as a visual differentiation between candidates.
Sources: City of Hamilton, "Nominated Candidates"

== Catholic school board trustee elections ==
=== Ward 1, 2 & 15 ===
Incumbent Mark Valvasori registered on May 21, 2026. He was acclaimed in 2022.

2026 Hamilton, Ontario municipal election: Ward 1, 2 & 15 HWCDSB trustee
Candidate	Popular vote			Expenditures
Candidate	Votes	%	±%	Expenditures
Mark Valvasori (incumbent)	Acclaimed			
Total valid votes				
Total rejected, unmarked and declined votes				
Turnout				
Eligible voters				
Note: Candidate campaign colours are based on the prominent colour used in campaign items (signs, literature, etc.) and are used as a visual differentiation between candidates.
Sources: City of Hamilton, "Nominated Candidates"

=== Ward 3 and 4 ===
2026 Hamilton, Ontario municipal election: Ward 3 and 4 HWCDSB trustee
Candidate	Popular vote			Expenditures
Candidate	Votes	%	±%	Expenditures
Ralph Agostino	Acclaimed			
Total valid votes				
Total rejected, unmarked and declined votes				
Turnout				
Eligible voters				
Note: Candidate campaign colours are based on the prominent colour used in campaign items (signs, literature, etc.) and are used as a visual differentiation between candidates.
Sources: City of Hamilton, "Nominated Candidates"

=== Ward 5 ===
2026 Hamilton, Ontario municipal election: Ward 5 HWCDSB trustee
Candidate	Popular vote			Expenditures
Candidate	Votes	%	±%	Expenditures
Aldo D'Intino (incumbent)	Acclaimed			
Total valid votes				
Total rejected, unmarked and declined votes				
Turnout				
Eligible voters				
Note: Candidate campaign colours are based on the prominent colour used in campaign items (signs, literature, etc.) and are used as a visual differentiation between candidates.
Sources: City of Hamilton, "Nominated Candidates"

=== Ward 6 ===
2026 Hamilton, Ontario municipal election: Ward 6 HWCDSB trustee
Candidate	Popular vote			Expenditures
Candidate	Votes	%	±%	Expenditures
Ellen Agostino (incumbent)				
Joanne Belanger				
Anthony Mari				
Total valid votes				
Total rejected, unmarked and declined votes				
Turnout				
Eligible voters				
Note: Candidate campaign colours are based on the prominent colour used in campaign items (signs, literature, etc.) and are used as a visual differentiation between candidates.
Sources: City of Hamilton, "Nominated Candidates"

=== Ward 7 ===
2026 Hamilton, Ontario municipal election: Ward 7 HWCDSB trustee
Candidate	Popular vote			Expenditures
Candidate	Votes	%	±%	Expenditures
Nick Agostino				
Kevin Duffy				
Luca Filice				
Total valid votes				
Total rejected, unmarked and declined votes				
Turnout				
Eligible voters				
Note: Candidate campaign colours are based on the prominent colour used in campaign items (signs, literature, etc.) and are used as a visual differentiation between candidates.
Sources: City of Hamilton, "Nominated Candidates"

=== Ward 8 and 14 ===
2026 Hamilton, Ontario municipal election: Ward 8 and 14 HWCDSB trustee
Candidate	Popular vote			Expenditures
Candidate	Votes	%	±%	Expenditures
Jessica Bonilla-Damptey				
Wieslawa Helena Chrapka				
John Valvasori (incumbent)				
Total valid votes				
Total rejected, unmarked and declined votes				
Turnout				
Eligible voters				
Note: Candidate campaign colours are based on the prominent colour used in campaign items (signs, literature, etc.) and are used as a visual differentiation between candidates.
Sources: City of Hamilton, "Nominated Candidates"

=== Ward 9 and 11 ===
2026 Hamilton, Ontario municipal election: Ward 9 and 11 HWCDSB trustee
Candidate	Popular vote			Expenditures
Candidate	Votes	%	±%	Expenditures
Tyler Iorio (Note 1)	Acclaimed			
Total valid votes				
Total rejected, unmarked and declined votes				
Turnout				
Eligible voters				
Note 1: Iorio was appointed to fill a vacancy as Ward 7 HWCDSB trustee. Note: Candidate campaign colours are based on the prominent colour used in campaign items (signs, literature, etc.) and are used as a visual differentiation between candidates.
Sources: City of Hamilton, "Nominated Candidates"

=== Ward 10 ===
2026 Hamilton, Ontario municipal election: Ward 10 HWCDSB trustee
Candidate	Popular vote			Expenditures
Candidate	Votes	%	±%	Expenditures
Andrea Di Nicola				
Mary Nardini (incumbent)				
Total valid votes				
Total rejected, unmarked and declined votes				
Turnout				
Eligible voters				
Note: Candidate campaign colours are based on the prominent colour used in campaign items (signs, literature, etc.) and are used as a visual differentiation between candidates.
Sources: City of Hamilton, "Nominated Candidates"

=== Ward 12 and 13 ===
Incumbent trustee Phil Homerski registered to run for re-election on May 19, 2026. Homerski was re-elected for his second term in 2022 with 57.91% of the vote.

2026 Hamilton, Ontario municipal election: Ward 12 and 13 HWCDSB trustee
Candidate	Popular vote			Expenditures
Candidate	Votes	%	±%	Expenditures
Phil Homerski (incumbent)				
Kevin McKenna				
Paul Mercante				
Christopher Xenos				
Total valid votes				
Total rejected, unmarked and declined votes				
Turnout				
Eligible voters				
Note: Candidate campaign colours are based on the prominent colour used in campaign items (signs, literature, etc.) and are used as a visual differentiation between candidates.
Sources: City of Hamilton, "Nominated Candidates"

== French language trustee elections ==
=== Conseil scolaire Viamonde ===
Incumbent trustee Pierre Gregory registered for re-election on May 15, 2026. He was acclaimed in 2022. Gregory withdrew from the race on July 29 without providing a statement for his withdrawal.

2026 Hamilton, Ontario municipal election: Conseil scolaire Viamonde trustee
Candidate	Popular vote			Expenditures
Candidate	Votes	%	±%	Expenditures
Sonia Macaluso	Acclaimed			
Total valid votes				
Total rejected, unmarked and declined votes				
Turnout				
Eligible voters				
Note: Candidate campaign colours are based on the prominent colour used in campaign items (signs, literature, etc.) and are used as a visual differentiation between candidates.
Sources: City of Hamilton, "Nominated Candidates"

=== Conseil scolair catholique MonAvenir ===
2026 Hamilton, Ontario municipal election: Conseil scolair catholique MonAvenir trustee
Candidate	Popular vote			Expenditures
Candidate	Votes	%	±%	Expenditures
Nathalie Dufour Seguin	Acclaimed			
Total valid votes				
Total rejected, unmarked and declined votes				
Turnout				
Eligible voters				
Note: Candidate campaign colours are based on the prominent colour used in campaign items (signs, literature, etc.) and are used as a visual differentiation between candidates.
Sources: City of Hamilton, "Nominated Candidates"
