= Strong Mayors, Building Homes Act =

Ontario, Canada statute of 2022

Strong Mayors, Building Homes Act, 2022

Legislative Assembly of Ontario
- Long title: An Act to amend various statutes with respect to special powers and duties of heads of council
- Citation: S.O. 2022, c. 18
- Territorial extent: Toronto, municipalities designated under O. Reg. 530/22
- Royal assent: September 8, 2022

Legislative history
- Bill citation: Bill 3
- Introduced by: Steve Clark MPP, Minister of Municipal Affairs and Housing
- First reading: August 10, 2022
- Second reading: August 18, 2022
- Third reading: September 8, 2022

Related legislation
- Municipal Act, 2001; City of Toronto Act, 2006
- Status: In force

The Strong Mayors, Building Homes Act, 2022 (French: Loi de 2022 pour des maires forts et pour la construction de logements) is a statute in Ontario that grants extra powers to the Mayor of Toronto and the mayors of other designated municipalities within their mayor–council governments.

== Powers granted ==
Previously, all Ontario mayors had little to no direct unilateral power, with the role largely limited to chairing council meetings, appointing committee chairs and performing ceremonial duties. All decisions had to be approved by council via a majority vote. Mayors generally did have considerable soft power in terms of influence over council, however they could still be overruled if a majority of council disagreed with their actions. This system can be defined as a "weak-mayor" system.

Under the Act, the provincial government could designate municipalities to use an alternative "strong-mayor" system. Under this, the mayors of designated municipalities would be granted direct control over the following matters:

- Drafting of the city budgets, which would normally done by a council committee
- The appointment and dismissal of city managers and department leaders (except for police chiefs, fire chiefs, and auditors general)
- The creation, dissolution and reorganisation of municipal administrative departments
- Veto power over by-laws that may conflict with priorities defined by the provincial government, which may be overridden by a two-thirds supermajority of council

Initially, the cities designated under this system included Toronto and Ottawa. This was later expanded to include numerous other municipalities.

In terms of Toronto, the "strong-mayor" powers are defined directly in the City of Toronto Act and can only be revoked by an Act of Provincial Parliament. As for other municipalities, the designation is done by Order-in-Council and defined in regulation, meaning the "strong-mayor" powers can be granted or revoked by the provincial government at will. The "provincial priorities" which relate to the mayor's veto power are also defined in regulation.

== Expansion ==
On December 8, 2022, the Ontario legislature passed the Better Municipal Governance Act, 2022, which expanded the "strong-mayor" powers. Particularly, it added the ability to pass a by-law with only one-third support of council if it relates to priorities defined by the provincial government.

The ability to pass certain by-laws with only one-third support of council was criticized by political experts as being highly undemocratic, noting that no other established democracy is known to have a mechanism which allows for laws to be passed with only minority legislative approval.

In 2026, the Ontario government passed the Better Regional Governance Act, 2026 with the intention to further expand the strong mayor system to some upper-tier municipalities, referred to as "strong chairs". This arrangement differs significantly in that while mayors are directly elected, regional chairs were changed to being appointed by the province, including in areas that previously held direct elections for the position of chair (e.g. Durham). Many councilors and local columnists raised concerns regarding the increase in centralized, autocratic rule and provincial control over local governance.

== Reactions ==
John Tory, the mayor of Toronto at the time, expressed appreciation for the powers granted to him under the act.

All five living former Toronto mayors, David Crombie, David Miller, Barbara Hall, Art Eggleton and John Sewell, wrote a letter to Tory describing the new powers as an "attack" on local democracy and majority rule. The Ford government defended the new powers by pointing out the mayor's "city-wide mandate", having received more votes than the rest of council.

Outgoing Ottawa mayor Jim Watson deemed the powers unnecessary, also opining that "if they have to gather up two-thirds of their members to overturn a mayor's decision that's not really democratic at all." Mayoral candidate Catherine McKenney also criticised the reforms as "undemocratic."

Former Hamilton mayor Bob Bratina expressed support for the powers. Andrea Horwath, a mayoral candidate, opposed the powers.

Bonnie Crombie, the then-mayor of Mississauga, voiced opposition to the Act. Despite this, in October 2023 she would invoke the one-third power to pass a bill permitting the construction of fourplexes.

== Designated municipalities ==
Municipalities (other than Toronto) which use the strong-mayor system are defined in Schedule 1 of O. Reg. 530/22.. As of June 2026, 215 out of the 443 municipalities in Ontario are designated, including both urban and rural communities alike.
