= Keanin Loomis =

Mayor of Hamilton

His Worship Keanin Loomis
- Loomis in 2022

59th Mayor of Hamilton
- Incumbent
- Assumed office November 15, 2026
- Preceded by: Andrea Horwath

Personal details
- Born: January 25, 1975 (age 51) Oswego, New York, U.S.
- Spouse: Trish Loomis (m. 2001)
- Children: 3
- Education: University of Waterloo (BA); College of William & Mary (JD)
- Website: www.voteloomis.ca

Keanin Loomis (born January 25, 1975) is a Canadian politician and lawyer who has been the 59th and current mayor of Hamilton since 2026.

Loomis previously ran for mayor in the 2022 election. After the 2022 election, he served as vice president of member services for the Ontario Chamber of Commerce and president and CEO of the Canadian Institute of Steel Construction.

== Early life, education and career ==
Keanin Loomis was born in Oswego, New York. When he was 12, his mother got remarried to a Canadian teacher and they moved to London, Ontario. He went to high school in London, Ontario and then went to the University of Waterloo, which is where he met his future wife, Trish Loomis, who is from Hamilton, Ontario.

He graduated from the University of Waterloo in 2000 with a Bachelor of Arts in Political Science. He then went back to the United States for Law School at the College of William & Mary in Virginia in 2003. He spent nine years living in Virginia, working as a lawyer in Washington D.C. for Akin Gump Strauss Hauer & Feld LLP.

He moved to Hamilton with his wife in 2009 after losing his job in the wake of the 2008 financial crisis. In 2010, he cofounded and served as chief operating officer of Innovation Factory, a not-for-profit business accelerator and a regional innovation centre. He served in that role until 2013.

In 2013, he was chosen to serve as the president and CEO of the Hamilton Chamber of Commerce, a position he held until his resignation in March 2022, when he was preparing to run for mayor.

He was announced as the vice president of member services for the Ontario Chamber of Commerce on February 1, 2023. He left that role and was appointed president and CEO of the Canadian Institute of Steel Construction on June 17, 2024, a position he then left on August 1, 2026, to run for mayor a second time.

He was elected mayor of Hamilton on October 26, 2026, and will be inaugurated on November 15, 2026.

== Electoral record ==
2026 Hamilton, Ontario mayoral election
Candidate	Popular vote			Expenditures
Candidate	Votes	%	±%	Expenditures
Keanin Loomis	61,040	41.77	+1.36	
Rob Cooper	46,573	31.87		
Andrea Horwath (X)	21,223	14.52	−27.16	
Scarlett Gillespie	9,531	6.52		
Ejaz Butt	1,686	1.15	−0.19	
Sasha Austin	1,367	0.94		
David Harrison	1,295	0.89		
David Cherkewski	776	0.53		
Kevin Walker	600	0.41		
Pamela Mitchell	590	0.40		
Erin Janus	517	0.35		
Paul Fromm	503	0.34	−0.29	
Nathalie Xian Yi Yan	420	0.29		
Total valid votes	146,121	100.00		
Total rejected, unmarked and declined votes				
Turnout				
Eligible voters				
Note: Hamilton municipal elections are officially non-partisan. Candidate campaign colours are based on the prominent colour used in campaign materials and are used to visually differentiate candidates.
Sources: City of Hamilton, "Nominated Candidates"

Candidates for the 24 October 2022 Hamilton mayoral election
Candidate	Popular vote			Expenditures
Candidate	Votes	%	±%	Expenditures
Andrea Horwath	59,216	41.68	-	$193,174.99
Keanin Loomis	57,553	40.41	-	$203,617.39
Bob Bratina	17,436	12.27	-	n/a^{1}
Ejaz Butt	1,907	1.34	-	$0
Solomon Ikhuiwu	1,867	1.31	-	$5,398.07
Jim Davis	1,433	1.01	-0.5%	n/a^{1}
Michael Pattison	1,422	1.00	+0.33%	n/a^{1}
Paul Fromm	898	0.63	+0.12%	$2,732.99
Hermiz Ishaya	326	0.23	-	$0
Total votes	142,058			
Registered voters	405,288	35.38%	-3.32%	
^{1} These candidates did not submit official financial statements, and are therefore ineligible to run in the 2026 municipal election. Note: All Hamilton municipal elections are officially non-partisan. Candidate campaign colours are based on the prominent colour used in campaign items (signs, literature, etc.) and are used as a visual differentiation between candidates.
Sources: City of Hamilton, "Nominated Candidates"
