= 2025 South Korean by-elections =

The 2025 South Korean by-elections were held in 2025. According to the Public Official Election Act of South Korea, the first half by-elections were held on April 2, 2025.

The April 2, 2025 by-elections were held for vacancies in heads of local governments, local councilors, and superintendents of education that occurred from March 1, 2024 to February 28, 2025. Suffrage was granted to South Korean citizens residing in the election areas born on or before April 3, 2007, and to foreigners who have obtained permanent residency under Article 10 of the Immigration Act and resided in South Korea for more than three years.

As a result of the vote counting, pan-progressive opposition parties including the Democratic Party of Korea achieved a landslide victory, winning the Guro District Mayor (Democratic Party of Korea), Asan Mayor (Democratic Party of Korea), Damyang County Commissioner (Korea Innovation Party), Geoje Mayor (Democratic Party of Korea), and Busan Superintendent of Education (Progressive). The pan-conservative bloc including the People Power Party suffered a crushing defeat, only retaining the Gimcheon Mayor (People Power Party).

== April 2 by-elections ==
=== Overview ===
- Election Date: April 2, 2025
- Election Details: Total of 23 constituencies
  - Basic local government heads: 5
  - Metropolitan council members: 8
  - Basic council members: 9
  - Superintendent of Education: 1

=== Election schedule ===
- 2024 December 19 ~ 2024 December 20: Start of preliminary candidate registration application
- ~ 2025 March 3: Resignation period for those restricted from candidacy
- 2025 March 11 ~ 2025 March 15: Voter register preparation, Absentee voting notification and preparation of absentee voter register, Application for sending election materials for soldiers, etc.

=== Electoral Districts and Reasons ===
==== Basic Local Government Heads ====
Position	Party	Predecessor	Constituency	Reason	Type
Seoul Guro District Mayor	People Power Party	Moon Heon-il	Seoul Guro District Mayor	Resignation	By-election
Chungnam Asan Mayor	People Power Party	Park Kyung-gwi	Chungnam Asan Mayor	Nullification of Election	Re-election
Jeonnam Damyang County Mayor	Democratic Party	Lee Byeong-no	Jeonnam Damyang County Mayor	Nullification of Election	Re-election

==== Metropolitan Council Members ====
Position	Party	Predecessor	Constituency	Reason	Type
Daegu Metropolitan Council Member	People Power Party	Jeon Tae-seon	Dalseo District 6th Constituency	Nullification of Election	Re-election

==== Superintendent of Education ====
Position	Predecessor	Constituency	Reason	Type
Busan Metropolitan Superintendent of Education	Ha Yun-su	Busan	Nullification of Election	Re-election
