= 2022 South Korean by-elections =

The 2022 South Korean by-elections were held in 2 different sessions:

- March 2022 South Korean by-elections - 9 March 2022; along with the presidential election
- June 2022 South Korean by-elections - 1 June 2022; along with the local elections.
