= Daegu Metropolitan Council =

Daegu Metropolitan Council 대구광역시의회
- 9th Daegu Metropolitan Council

Type
- Type: Unicameral

History
- Founded: 8 July 1991

Leadership
- Chairman: Lee Man-gyu, People Power
- Vice Chairman: Lee Yeong-ae, People Power
- Vice Chairman: Ha Byeong-mun, People Power

Structure
- Seats: 32
- Political groups: People Power (31) Democratic (1)
- Length of term: 4 years

Elections
- Voting system: Parallel voting: First-past-the-post (27 seats); Party-list proportional representation (3 seats)
- Last election: 1 June 2022

Website
- Daegu Metropolitan Council

- Daegu Metropolitan Council
- Hangul: 대구광역시의회
- Hanja: 大邱廣域市議會
- RR: Daegu-gwangyeoksi uihoe
- MR: Taegu-gwangyŏksi ŭihoe

The Daegu Metropolitan Council (Korean: 대구광역시의회) is the local council of Daegu.

There are a total of 30 members, with 27 members elected in the First-past-the-post voting system and 3 members elected in Party-list proportional representation.

== Current composition ==
| Political party | Seats |
|---|---|
| People Power | 31 |
| Democratic | 1 |
| Total | 32 |

The Daegu Metropolitan Council has no regulations on the negotiation group.

== Organization ==
The structure of Council consists of:

- Chairman
- Two Vice-chairmen
- Standing Committees
  - Steering Committee
  - Strategy and Administration Committee
  - Culture and Welfare Committee
  - Economy and Environment Committee
  - Construction and Transport Committee
  - Education Committee
- Special Committees
  - Special Committees on Budget and Accounts
  - Special Committees on Ethics

== Recent election results ==
=== 2018 ===
Summary of the 13 June 2018 Daegu Metropolitan Council election results
| Party | Constituency | | | | Party list | | | | Total seats | |
| Party | Votes | % | Seats | ± | Votes | % | Seats | ± | Seats | ± |
|---|---|---|---|---|---|---|---|---|---|---|
| Liberty Korea Party | 520,730 | 47.62 | 23 | ▼4 | 528,806 | 46.14 | 2 | 0 | 25 | ▼4 |
| Democratic Party of Korea | 394,277 | 36.05 | 4 | ▲4 | 410,081 | 35.78 | 1 | 0 | 5 | ▲4 |
| Bareunmirae Party | 61,602 | 5.64 | 0 | new | 123,592 | 10.78 | 0 | new | 0 | new |
| Justice Party | 14,202 | 1.31 | 0 | 0 | 49,736 | 4.34 | 0 | 0 | 0 | 0 |
| Korean Patriots' Party | 7,057 | 0.66 | 0 | new | 15,211 | 1.32 | 0 | new | 0 | new |
| Green Party Korea | — | | | | 7,535 | 0.65 | 0 | 0 | 0 | 0 |
| Minjung Party | 9,791 | 0.91 | 0 | new | 5,559 | 0.48 | 0 | new | 0 | new |
| Labor Party | — | | | | 5,380 | 0.46 | 0 | new | 0 | new |
| Independents | 85,354 | 7.81 | 0 | 0 | — | | | | 0 | 0 |
| Total | 1,094,013 | 100.00 | 27 | – | 1,145,900 | 100.00 | 3 | – | 30 | – |
