= Andrea Horwath =

Mayor of Hamilton and Canadian politician (born 1962)

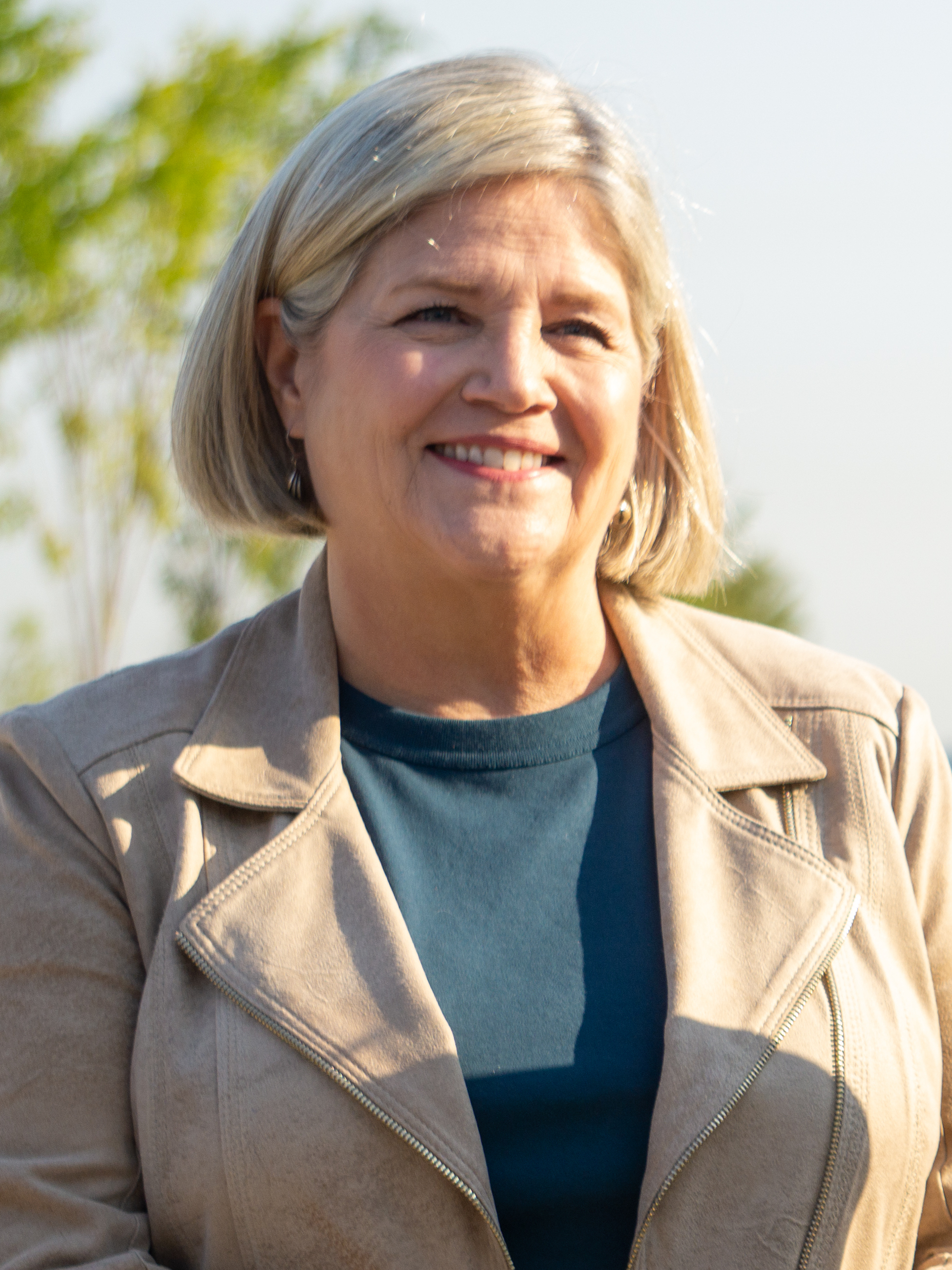
- Horwath in 2022

58th Mayor of Hamilton
- In office November 15, 2022 – November 15, 2026
- Preceded by: Fred Eisenberger
- Succeeded by: Keanin Loomis

Leader of the Official Opposition
- In office June 29, 2018 – June 28, 2022
- Preceded by: Vic Fedeli
- Succeeded by: Peter Tabuns

Leader of the Ontario New Democratic Party
- In office March 7, 2009 – June 28, 2022
- Deputy: Jagmeet Singh; Sara Singh; John Vanthof
- Preceded by: Howard Hampton
- Succeeded by: Peter Tabuns (interim)

Member of the Ontario Provincial Parliament for Hamilton Centre (Hamilton East; 2004–2007)
- In office May 13, 2004 – August 15, 2022
- Preceded by: Dominic Agostino
- Succeeded by: Sarah Jama

Hamilton City Councillor
- In office December 1, 1997 – June 16, 2004 Serving with Ron Corsini (1997–2000)
- Preceded by: Vince Agro; Bill McCulloch
- Succeeded by: Bob Bratina
- Constituency: Ward Two

Personal details
- Born: Andrea Lynn Horwath; October 24, 1962 (age 64) Stoney Creek, Ontario, Canada
- Party: Independent (Note: Municipal politicians in Ontario are elected on a non-partisan basis.) (municipal)
- Other political affiliations: Ontario New Democratic (provincial)
- Domestic partner: Ben Leonetti (c. 1985–2010)
- Children: 1
- Education: McMaster University (BA)
- Occupation: Politician; community development worker
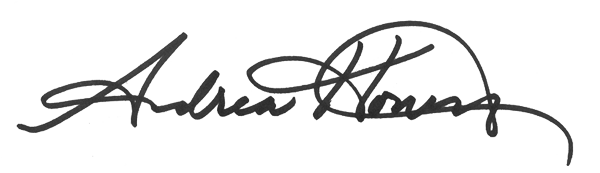
- Signature

Andrea Lynn Horwath (/ˈhɔːrvæθ/; born October 24, 1962) is a Canadian politician who served as the 58th mayor of Hamilton from 2022 to 2026. Horwath served as the leader of the Ontario New Democratic Party (NDP) from 2009 to 2022 and as the leader of the Official Opposition from 2018 to 2022.

Horwath was first elected in 1997, when she won a seat on Hamilton City Council. In 2004, she was elected as the member of Provincial Parliament (MPP) for Hamilton Centre, a seat she would hold until 2022. Horwath was elected as the leader Ontario NDP at the party's 2009 leadership convention, and led the party through four provincial elections, before resigning in 2022. She was the first woman to lead the NDP, and the third woman (after Lyn McLeod and Kathleen Wynne) to serve as leader of a party with official party status in Ontario.

During the 2018 provincial election, Horwath led the Ontario NDP to official opposition status after 23 years without government or official opposition status. The results of the 2022 provincial election, after which the Ontario NDP remained the official opposition, led to Horwath announcing her intention to resign as the leader of the Ontario NDP on the night of June 2, 2022. Her resignation took effect on June 28, 2022.

On July 26, 2022, Horwath announced her candidacy for mayor of Hamilton, and resigned her seat in the provincial legislature on August 15, 2022. She was elected mayor on October 24, 2022, and was sworn in on November 15. Horwath was defeated for re-election in 2026, placing third behind Keanin Loomis and Rob Cooper.

== Early life, education and early career ==
Andrea Lynn Horwath was born and raised in Stoney Creek. She is named after her father Andrew, an ethnic Hungarian who had immigrated to Canada from Slovakia, and worked on the assembly line at the Ford Motor Company plant in Oakville, Ontario. Her mother, Diane, is of French and Irish descent.

Horwath has a Bachelor of Arts degree from McMaster University. While her initial program was in human resources, she was drawn to labour studies. She worked part-time as a waitress to pay her way through university. After graduating, Horwath worked in literacy training, legal-aid advocacy, and "community organization".

== Early political career (1997–2004) ==
In the Canadian federal election of 1997, she was the NDP candidate against incumbent Liberal Stan Keyes in the riding of Hamilton West. Although unsuccessful, her second-place finish was a significant improvement on previous NDP efforts in the riding, and gave her an increased level of prominence in the city.

=== City councillor ===
Later in 1997, she was elected to Hamilton City Council for Ward Two, outpolling two incumbents who had represented the area for more than 20 years. She emerged as a prominent voice for the political left in the city, and was re-elected to council in 2000 and 2003. During her three terms as city councillor, she chaired the solid-waste-management committee and the municipal non-profit housing corporation.

== Provincial politics (2004–2022) ==
Horwath was elected to the Legislative Assembly of Ontario in a 2004 by-election in the then-extant provincial riding of Hamilton East, defeating Liberal candidate Ralph Agostino to succeed the deceased Liberal member Dominic Agostino, Ralph's brother. Winning 63.6 per cent of the vote, up from the NDP's 29.4 per cent in that riding six months earlier, her landslide victory boosted the NDP's seat count over the threshold for official party status in the legislature, and helped give the federal New Democratic Party a bounce in Hamilton that would continue into the federal election shortly thereafter.

In the 2007 election, Horwath ran in the new riding of Hamilton Centre, due to redistricting that divided her former Hamilton East riding between Hamilton Centre and the new riding of Hamilton East—Stoney Creek. Horwath's new Hamilton Centre riding included approximately half of her former riding as well as a portion of the former Hamilton West riding where she had run federally in 1997. It also included her entire former city council ward.

In the lead up to the campaign, Horwath was expected to face Hamilton West Liberal incumbent Judy Marsales. However, Marsales opted not to run for another term, and Horwath easily defeated Liberal candidate Steve Ruddick on election day.

=== Leader of the Ontario NDP ===
==== 2009 leadership election ====
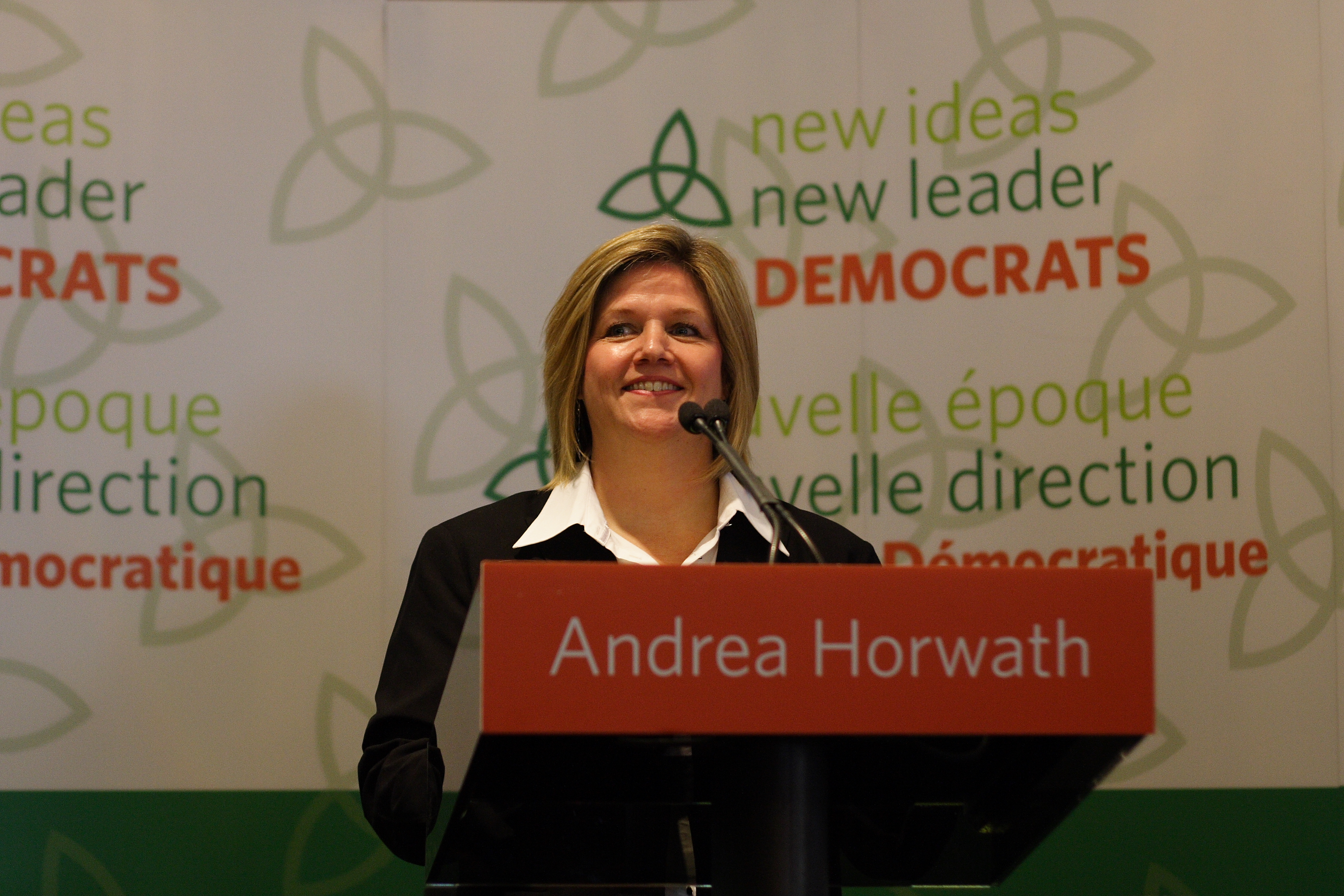
Horwath during a debate in the 2009 NDP leadership election

On November 7, 2008, Horwath officially launched her campaign to win the party's leadership. The leadership election was held March 6–8, 2009. Horwath led on the first two ballots, and won on the third ballot with 60.4% of the vote defeating Peter Tabuns, Gilles Bisson and Michael Prue.

==== 2011 general election ====
The 2011 provincial election saw a rise in support for the NDP under Horwath's leadership. The party won more than 20% of the popular vote for the first time since 1995 and almost doubled its seats to elect 17 members of the legislature. The election also resulted in the Liberal government of Dalton McGuinty being reduced to a minority government with the NDP holding the balance of power.

In April 2012, Horwath passed a leadership review at the party's convention with 76% support.

==== 2014 general election ====
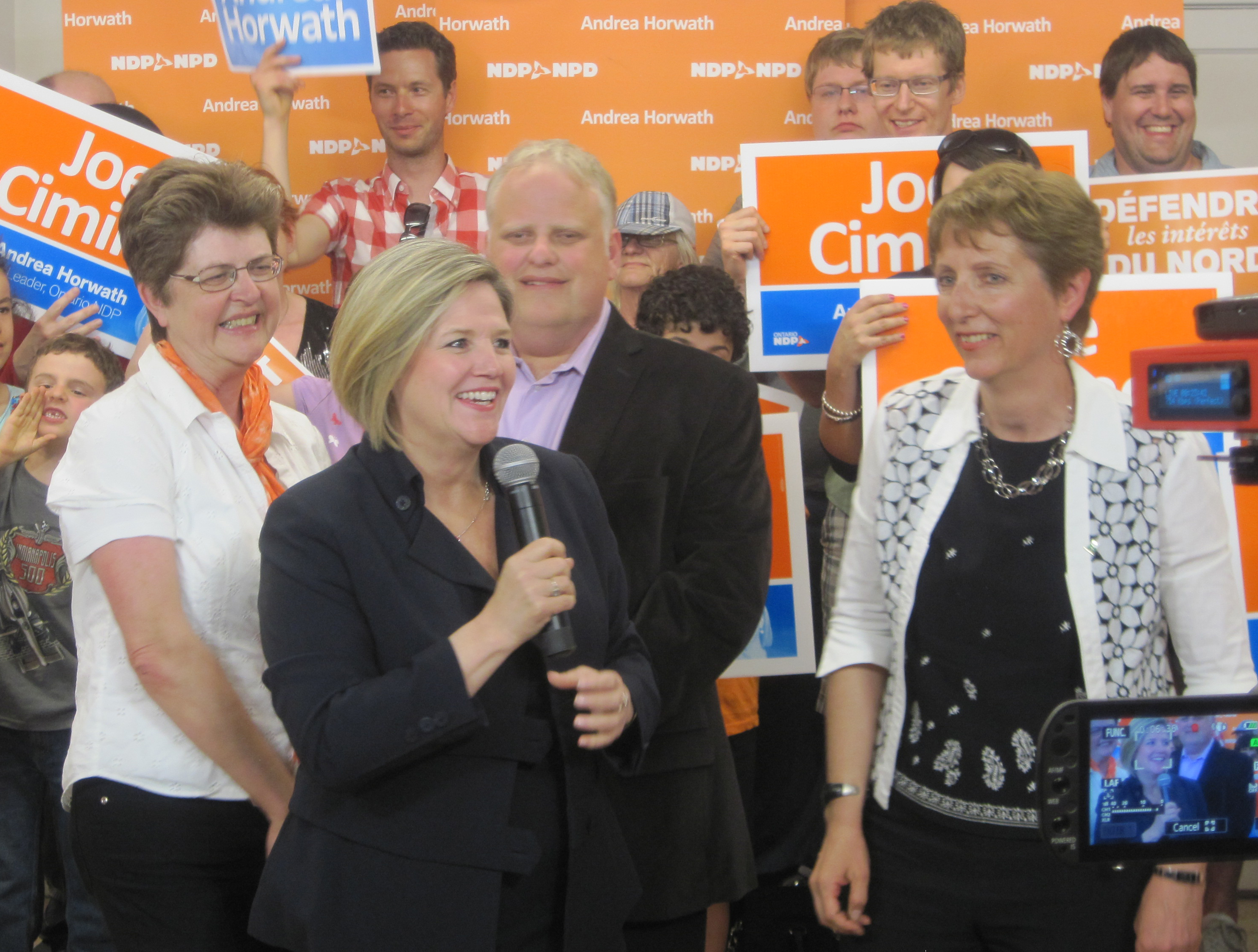
Horwath during the 2014 provincial election campaign

On May 2, Horwath announced that the NDP would be voting against the Liberals' proposed budget, triggering a spring election. Following this, Premier Kathleen Wynne formally asked Lieutenant Governor David Onley to dissolve the legislature and call an election for June 12, 2014. In the 2014 provincial election, the NDP was able to maintain its seat count of 21 at dissolution despite the loss of three seats in Toronto, but lost the balance of power when the Liberals took a majority win in the election. Horwath has faced criticism from some party members and progressives for running a populist campaign which they described as right-wing. Despite criticism of her leadership from some quarters, Horwath received a slightly increased level of support, 77%, at the party's post-election convention held on November 15.

==== 2018 general election ====
Horwath ran in her third election as NDP leader against the Liberal government led by Kathleen Wynne and a Progressive Conservative Party led by Doug Ford. Horwath promised to introduce "Canada's first universal Pharmacare plan", highlighted by a universal dental plan and a prescription drug plan that "will initially cover 125 of the most commonly prescribed drugs". She also promised a child care plan in which seventy per cent of Ontario parents "would either have free child care or pay an average of $12 a day in a licensed not-for-profit daycare". Horwath promised to return Hydro One to public ownership by buying back privately held shares. She also said that she would close the Pickering Nuclear Generating Station immediately, while the other party leaders have pledged to keep it open until 2024. The NDP promised to increase corporate tax rates from 11.5 to 12.5 per cent, as well as introducing an income tax increase for those earning over $220,000 per year. Horwath said the province would fund half of the operating cost of municipal transit and indicated that she would not introduce back-to-work legislation. The party's support in public opinion polls increased in May 2018, leading to greater media attention and greater scrutiny. With her party gaining official opposition status, she became the Leader of the Official Opposition during the 42nd Parliament, the second highest number of seats in the party's history. The NDP took all of old Toronto (i.e., what was the city of Toronto before the 1998 creation of the "megacity" of Toronto), as well as all but one seat in Hamilton and all but one seat in Niagara.

==== 2022 general election ====
Horwath and the NDP released their 2022 platform in April 2022. The NDP's campaign focused on increased funding for social programs and government services, which would be paid for through higher taxes on businesses and individuals earning over $200,000 per year. Funding would go toward reducing class sizes, raising welfare payments and disability payments, subsidies for black, indigenous and LGBTQ+ entrepreneurs, hiring more healthcare and education staff and increased wages for public servants. The NDP also proposed to expand COVID-19 vaccine mandates, implement a mixed member proportional electoral system, to close down all privately owned long-term care facilities and to stop the construction of new highway projects. Horwath was re-elected in Hamilton Centre and the NDP won opposition, but it lost 9 seats and placed third in the popular vote. Horwath resigned as leader election night. The election set a record for the lowest voter turnout in an Ontario provincial election, as only 44.06% of the people who were eligible voted. On August 15, 2022, she resigned as the MPP for Hamilton Centre.

== Mayor of Hamilton (2022–2026) ==
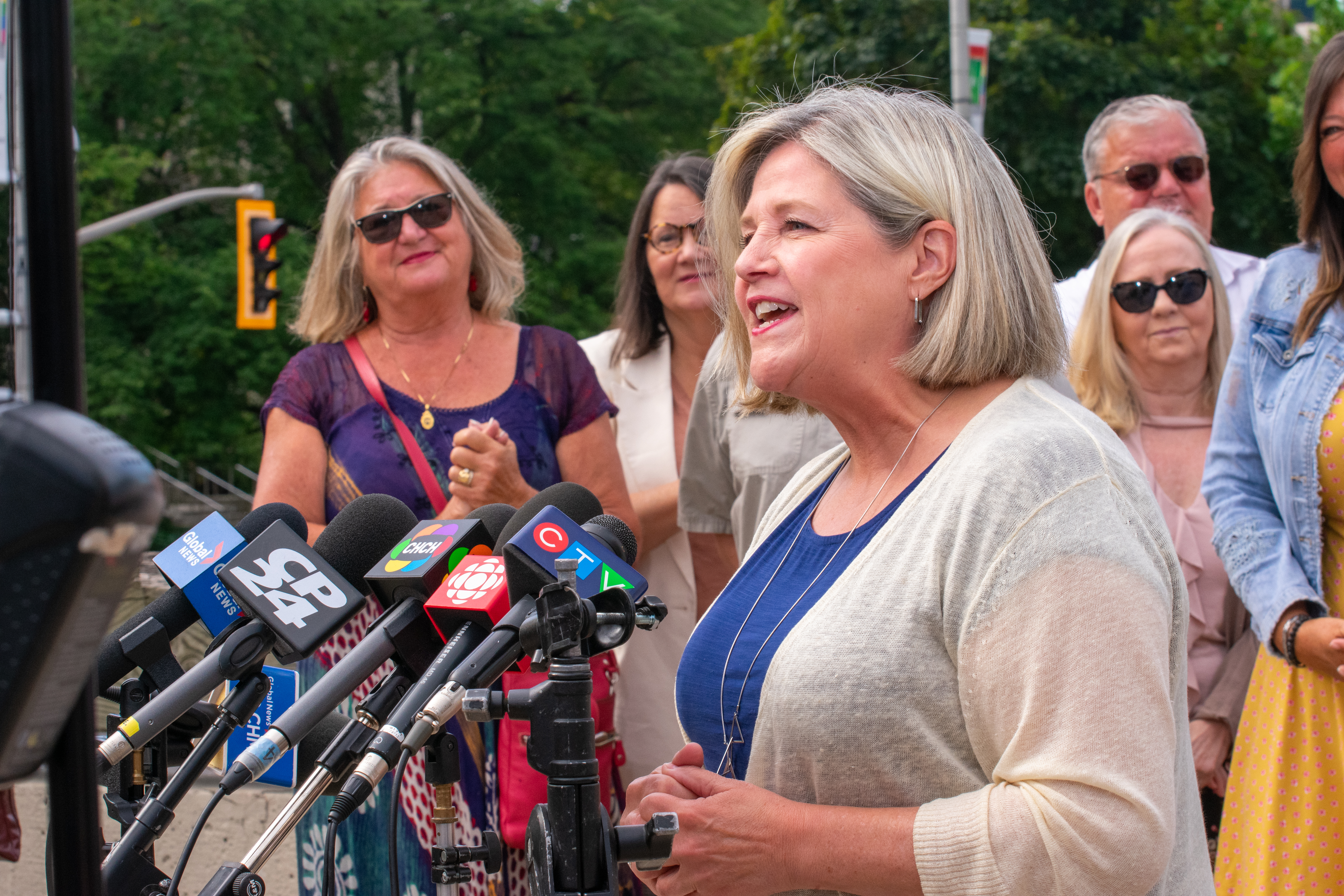
Horwath announcing her campaign for Mayor to media, July 2022.

Horwath ran as a candidate for the position of Mayor of Hamilton, Ontario in the October 2022 Hamilton, Ontario municipal election. She was elected on October 24, 2022. Horwath is the first woman to be elected mayor in Hamilton's history. Prior to amalgamation, the suburban communities of Stoney Creek and Ancaster had women mayors and former Hamilton Controller, Anne Jones, served as the first regional chair for the Region of Hamilton-Wentworth was also a woman.

=== Tenure ===
Horwath took office as mayor on November 15, 2022. She was one of the highest-paid mayors in Canada, earning over $270,000 in 2023.

In September 2024, she moved to make National Day of Truth and Reconciliation a municipal holiday.

In July 2025, Horwath announced her intention to seek a second term as mayor in 2026. With high public disapproval ratings, Horwath lost her re-election bid in October 2026, placing third.

==== City finances ====
In the 2023 budget, city council approved a 5.8% property tax increase, with the housing budget increasing by 30%. Similarly, the 2024 budget increased property taxes by 5.79%.

==== Housing ====
In April 2023, Hamilton city council declared a state of emergency over opioids, homelessness, and mental health.

In April 2024, following city council's rejection of the plan, Horwath used her strong mayor powers to pass a plan to build affordable housing on a Stoney Creek parking lot. Hamilton’s ethics watchdog later cleared Horwath of wrongdoing in response to a complaint over her role in advancing the plan. The provincial government had previously rewarded Hamilton with $17.5 million for exceeding 2023 housing targets.

In August 2024, she endorsed a previously proposed plan on sanctioned encampments offering tiny homes to unhoused people. The city later banned tents in public parks, and was sued by 14 unhoused residents, citing alleged infringed charter rights. The Ontario Superior Court later ruled in the city's favour in December 2024. The city also approved a plan to build an outdoor shelter on Barton Street, constructed in December 2024.

== Personal life ==
She lives in Hamilton with her son Julian (born November 1992), who is a rapper. In a March 2011 interview with the Toronto Star, she spoke publicly for the first time about the breakup of her longtime relationship with Julian's father, Hamilton businessman Ben Leonetti. Horwath had met Ben Leonetti in her university years, when she was working part-time as a waitress and he was a jazz musician. The two lived together for 25 years without getting married and split up in 2010. As of 2026, Horwath is suing Leonetti and the city of Hamilton to demolish a home that she owns and he resides at. In August, she stated that she was a survivor of intimate partner violence.

In 2025, Horwath suffered a fall outside Hamilton City Hall during "extremely windy conditions". She received surgery and treatment for multiple injuries.

== Awards ==
In March 2012, Horwath received the EVE award which is sponsored by Equal Voice, a non-profit organization focused on promoting women in politics. Past recipients have included women from every level of government.

== Electoral record ==
=== Provincial ===
2022 Ontario general election: Hamilton Centre
Party	Candidate	Votes	%	±%	Expenditures
New Democratic	Andrea Horwath	16,690	57.26	–7.99	$91,582
Progressive Conservative	Sarah Bokhari	4,800	16.47	+0.80	$11,970
Liberal	Ekaterini Dimakis	3,799	13.03	+2.15	$11,923
Green	Sandy Crawley	2,554	8.76	+3.02	$591
New Blue	John Chroust	483	1.66	–	$0
Ontario Party	Brad Peace	451	1.55	–	$589
Communist	Nigel Cheriyan	225	0.77	+0.41	$0
Independent	Nathalie Xian Yi Yan	145	0.50	–	$0
Total valid votes/expense limit		29,147	99.01	–	$108,893
Total rejected, unmarked and declined ballots		291	0.99	–0.19	
Turnout		29,438	37.94	–10.97	
Eligible voters		77,599			
New Democratic hold		Swing		–4.40	
Source: Elections Ontario

2018 Ontario general election
Party	Candidate	Votes	%	±%
New Democratic	Andrea Horwath	23,866	65.25	+13.24
Progressive Conservative	Dionne Duncan	5,730	15.67	+1.28
Liberal	Deirdre Pike	3,982	10.89	−12.61
Green	Jason Lopez	2,102	5.75	−2.78
None of the Above	Tony Lemma	320	0.87	
Libertarian	Robert Young	285	0.78	
Independent	Maria Anastasiou	156	0.43	
Communist	Mary Ellen Campbell	134	0.37	−0.27
Total valid votes		36,575	98.82	+0.94
Total rejected, unmarked and declined ballots		436	1.18	-0.94
Turnout		37,011	48.91	+4.15
Eligible voters		75,672		
New Democratic hold		Swing		
Source: Elections Ontario

2014 Ontario general election
Party	Candidate	Votes	%	±%
New Democratic	Andrea Horwath	18,697	52.01	-9.32
Liberal	Donna Tiqui-Shebib	8,450	23.50	+6.04
Progressive Conservative	John Vail	5,173	14.39	+1.22
Green	Peter Ormond	3,067	8.53	+4.81
Freedom	Peter Melanson	334	0.93	+0.54
Communist	Bob Mann	229	0.64	+0.28
Total valid votes		35,950	97.88	-1.60
Total rejected, unmarked and declined ballots		778	2.12	+1.60
Turnout		36,728	44.76	+2.33
Eligible voters		82,062		
New Democratic hold		Swing		-7.68
Source: Elections Ontario

2011 Ontario general election
Party	Candidate	Votes	%	±%
New Democratic	Andrea Horwath	20,586	61.33	+16.74
Liberal	Donna Tiqui-Shebib	5,861	17.46	-11.12
Progressive Conservative	Don Sheppard	4,421	13.17	-1.60
Green	Peter Ormond	1,249	3.72	-5.90
Libertarian	Robert Kuhlmann	634	1.89	
Independent	Micheal Baldasaro	268	0.80	
Family Coalition	Steve Passmore	229	0.68	-0.94
Freedom	Chris Lawson	130	0.39	
Communist	Anthony Gracey	122	0.36	-0.46
Reform	Robert Szajkowski	67	0.20	
Total valid votes		33,567	99.48	+0.56
Total rejected, unmarked and declined ballots		177	0.52	-0.56
Turnout		33,744	42.43	-6.20
Eligible voters		79,524		
New Democratic hold		Swing		+13.93
Sources: Elections Ontario The Hamilton Spectator The Hamilton Spectator

2007 Ontario general election
Party	Candidate	Votes	%
New Democratic	Andrea Horwath	17,176	44.72
Liberal	Steve Ruddick	11,096	28.89
Progressive Conservative	Chris Robertson	5,673	14.77
Green	Peter Ormond	3,610	9.40
Family Coalition	Lynne Scime	550	1.43
Communist	Bob Mann	302	0.79
Total valid votes		38,407	98.92
Total rejected, unmarked and declined ballots		415	1.08
Turnout		38,822	48.63
Eligible voters		79,828	

Hamilton East by-election, 2004 (Death of Dominic Agostino)
Party	Candidate	Votes	%	±%
New Democratic	Andrea Horwath	15,185	63.6	
Liberal	Ralph Agostino	6,362	26.6	
Progressive Conservative	Tara Crugnale	1,772	7.4	
Green	Raymond Dartsch	448	1.9	–
Independent	John Turmel	120	0.5	

=== Municipal ===
2026 Hamilton, Ontario mayoral election
Candidate	Popular vote			Expenditures
Candidate	Votes	%	±%	Expenditures
Keanin Loomis	61,040	41.77	+1.36	
Rob Cooper	46,573	31.87		
Andrea Horwath (X)	21,223	14.52	−27.16	
Scarlett Gillespie	9,531	6.52		
Ejaz Butt	1,686	1.15	−0.19	
Sasha Austin	1,367	0.94		
David Harrison	1,295	0.89		
David Cherkewski	776	0.53		
Kevin Walker	600	0.41		
Pamela Mitchell	590	0.40		
Erin Janus	517	0.35		
Paul Fromm	503	0.34	−0.29	
Nathalie Xian Yi Yan	420	0.29		
Total valid votes	146,121	100.00		
Total rejected, unmarked and declined votes				
Turnout				
Eligible voters				
Note: Hamilton municipal elections are officially non-partisan. Candidate campaign colours are based on the prominent colour used in campaign materials and are used to visually differentiate candidates.
Sources: City of Hamilton, "Nominated Candidates"

2022 Hamilton Mayoral Election
Candidate	Popular vote			Expenditures
Candidate	Votes	%	±%	Expenditures
Andrea Horwath	59,216	41.68		
Keanin Loomis	57,553	40.41		
Bob Bratina	17,436	12.27		
Ejaz Butt	1,907	1.34		
Solomon Ikhuiwu	1,867	1.31		
Jim Davis	1,433	1.01		
Michael Pattison	1,422	1.00		
Paul Fromm	898	0.63		
Hermiz Ishaya	326	0.23		
Total votes				
Registered voters				
Note: All Hamilton Municipal Elections are officially non-partisan. Note: Candidate campaign colours are based on the prominent colour used in campaign items (signs, literature, etc.) and are used as a visual differentiation between candidates.
Sources: City of Hamilton, "Nominated Candidates"

2003 Hamilton Election: Councillor, Ward 2
Candidate	Votes	%
Andrea Horwath (x)	4,601	63.81
James Novak	1,993	27.64
Ronald Berenbaum	325	4.51
Jerry Moore	291	4.04

2000 Hamilton Election: Councillor, Ward 2
Candidate	Votes	%
Andrea Horwath (x)	4,192	50.0
Ron Corsini (x)	3,263	39.0
Ed Fisher	911	11.0

1997 Hamilton Election: Councillor, Ward 2
Candidate	Votes	%
Andrea Horwath	3,587	28.1
Ron Corsini	3,364	26.4
Vince Agro (x)	2,097	16.4
Bill McCulloch (x)	2,097	16.4
Jason Capobianco	902	7.1
John Kenyon	512	4.0
Jim Savage	208	1.6

=== Federal ===
1997 Canadian federal election: Hamilton West
Party	Candidate	Votes
Liberal	Stan Keyes (x)	20,951
New Democratic	Andrea Horwath	7,648
Progressive Conservative	John Findlay	6,510
Reform	Ken Griffith	6,285
Natural Law	Brian Rickard	323
Marxist–Leninist	Wendell Fields	170
