= 2023 Ontario New Democratic Party leadership election =

Canadian province party leader election

- February 4, 2023
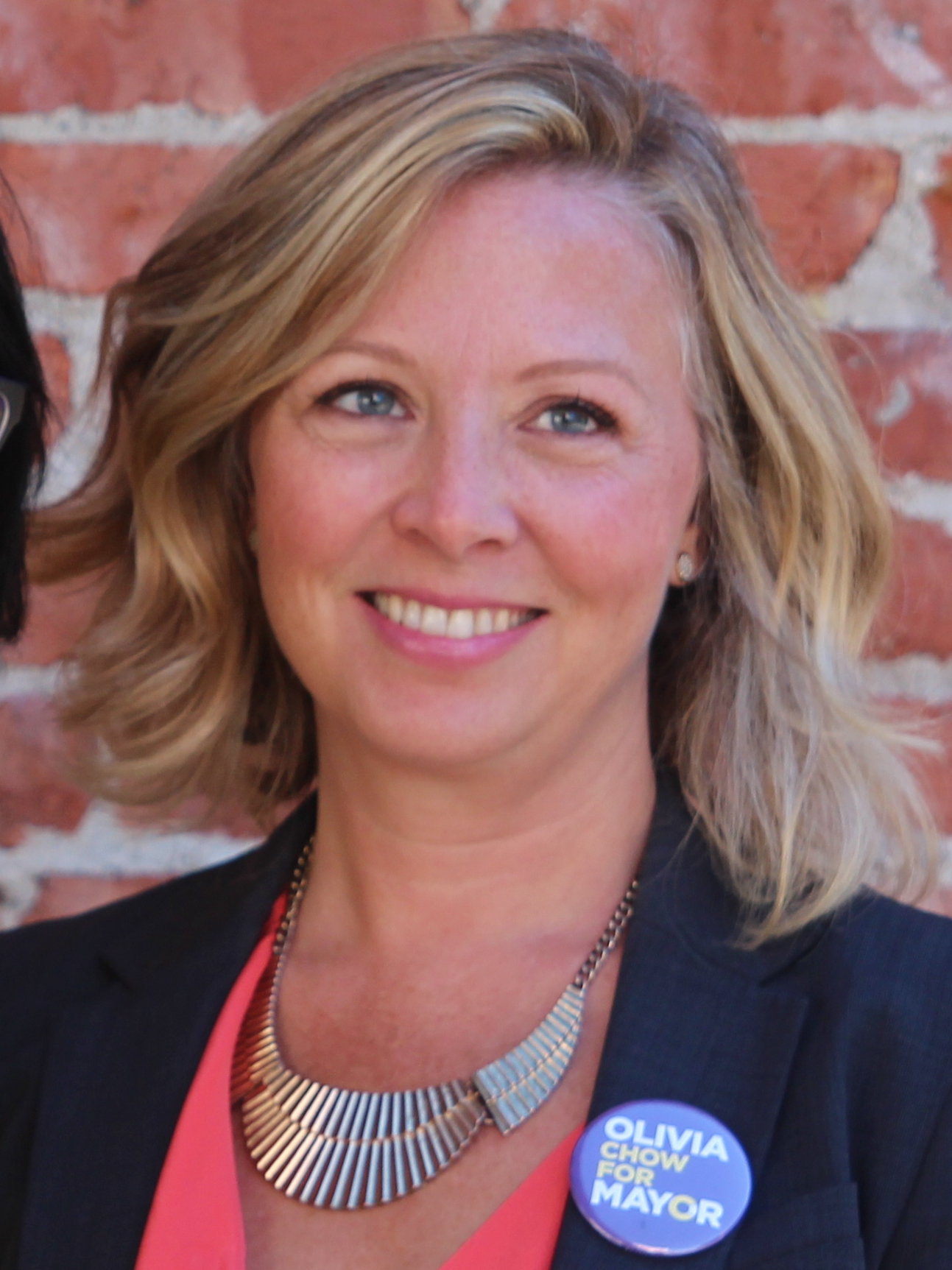
Candidate	Marit Stiles
Riding	Davenport
First ballot	Acclaimed
Leader before election
Peter Tabuns (Interim)
Elected Leader
Marit Stiles

2023 Ontario New Democratic Party leadership election
- Date: February 4, 2023
- Convention: Metro Toronto Convention Centre, Toronto, Ontario
- Resigning leader: Andrea Horwath
- Won by: Marit Stiles
- Ballots: 0 (acclamation)
- Candidates: 1
- Entrance fee: $55,000
- Spending limit: $900,000

The 2023 Ontario New Democratic Party leadership election was held in Toronto, on February 4, 2023. The leadership election was called after ONDP leader Andrea Horwath announced her resignation on June 2, 2022, in her concession speech on the night of the 2022 Ontario general election, in which the Progressive Conservative Party of Ontario won a second consecutive majority government under Doug Ford.

Horwath led the party through four provincial elections since winning the March 2009 Ontario New Democratic Party leadership election. Under her leadership, the party increased its seat count in the legislature in 2011, 2014, forming Official Opposition in 2018, before losing seats, while remaining Official Opposition, in 2022. Former education critic Marit Stiles was the sole candidate in the contest when nominations closed on December 5. Accordingly, she was acclaimed leader on February 4. The vote was initially expected to be held on March 4, but the NDP provincial council moved the date up to February 4.

== Background ==
In the 2022 general election, the Ontario New Democrats saw a decline support over their 2018 result, remaining as official opposition with 31 seats, a loss of nine seats as well as almost 10 percentage points in its share of the popular vote. The NDP finished third in the popular vote, about 5,000 votes behind the Ontario Liberal Party who finished second in the popular vote, but third place in seat count.

On the night of the election, Horwath announced her resignation as party leader, stating that she would step down as soon as the NDP picks an interim leader. After receiving the unanimous endorsement of the party's newly elected caucus, Peter Tabuns was subsequently selected as interim leader by the party's provincial council on June 28, 2022.

== Rules and procedures ==
In the past, the Ontario NDP has used a traditional delegated leadership convention to select its leaders in which delegates elected by local riding associations, campus clubs, labour union locals affiliated with the party choose the leader. However, at its January 2007 provincial convention, the Ontario NDP amended its constitution bringing in a one member one vote procedure modelled on that used by the federal New Democratic Party in its 2003 federal leadership election in which the votes of all party members is weighted to 75% of the total with the remaining 25% being allocated to the party's affiliates (mostly labour unions).

The ONDP constitution (Article 8, Section 1.4) stipulates that:

- (a) Every member is entitled to cast a ballot for the election of the Leader.
- (b) The ballots cast by Party members shall be weighted to a total of 75% of the votes counted in a Leadership election, and the balance, 25% of the votes counted in a Leadership election, shall be allocated among the affiliated members.
- (c) At every regular convention that is not a leadership convention, a secret ballot vote will be held to determine whether or not a leadership election should be called. If a majority of the voting delegates supports the calling of a leadership election, such an election will be held within one year of the convention vote.
- (d) The Leader will be chosen by secret ballot. Candidates for the leadership with the fewest weighted votes will drop off the ballot in subsequent rounds until one candidate receives a majority of the total weighted votes cast in that round. Other leadership selection procedures will be determined by Provincial Council.

In July 2022, the party announced that the leadership vote will conclude by the first week of March 2023. They outlined the requirements for entry, which include a $55,000 entry fee ($5,000 of which is due "up front"), and 100 signatures from party members, including 50 from women, 25 from members of equity-seeking groups, and 20 from members in specific geographic regions.

== Timeline ==
- June 2, 2022 - Ontario general election held, resulting in a second consecutive majority PC government. The NDP remains Official Opposition, while losing nine seats. Andrea Horwath announces her resignation in her concession speech.
- June 13, 2022 - Peter Tabuns unanimously recommended by Ontario NDP caucus to be selected as interim leader.
- June 28, 2022 - Tabuns is confirmed as interim leader by the party's provincial council.
- July 16, 2022 - The Ontario NDP announces the leadership vote will conclude in the first week of March, 2023, and indicates there will be a $55,000 entry fee for contestants.
- July 18, 2022 - Leadership campaign period officially opens.
- December 5, 2022 - Deadline for candidates to register.
- January 3, 2023 - Deadline to join or renew party membership.
- January 28, 2023 - Voting opens for members in good standing.
- February 4, 2023 - Marit Stiles acclaimed as the new Leader.

== Acclaimed candidate ==
=== Marit Stiles ===
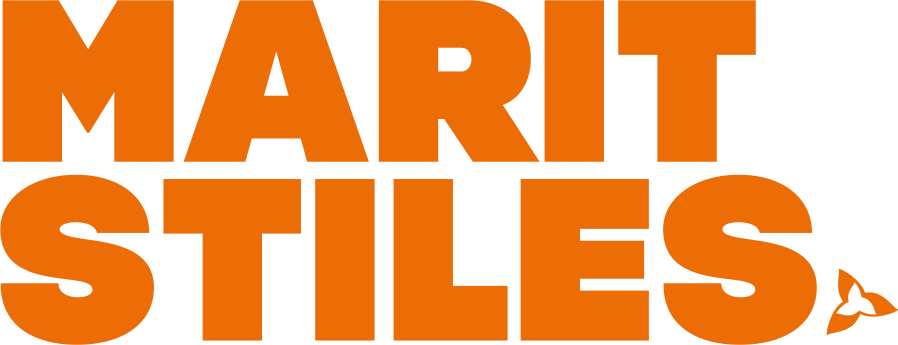
Marit Stiles Campaign Logo

Background: MPP for Davenport (2018–present), former President of the federal NDP (2016–2018), national director of research, public policy and communications for ACTRA, and a trustee on the Toronto District School Board (2014–2018).
Date announced: September 22, 2022
Date registered with Elections Ontario: September 21, 2022
Campaign website: Marit Stiles

Endorsements of Marit Stiles

MPPs: (8)

- Chandra Pasma (MPP for Ottawa West—Nepean)
- Kristyn Wong-Tam (MPP for Toronto Centre; former Toronto City Councillor)
- Bhutila Karpoche (MPP for Parkdale—High Park)
- Jessica Bell (MPP for University—Rosedale)
- Tom Rakocevic (MPP for Humber River—Black Creek)
- Terence Kernaghan (MPP for London North Centre)
- Peggy Sattler (MPP for London West)
- Jennifer French (MPP for Oshawa)

Unions: (2)

- Amalgamated Transit Union
- United Steelworkers

Former MPPs: (2)

- Cheri DiNovo (Former MPP for Parkdale—High Park)
- Suze Morrison (Former MPP for Toronto Centre)

Former Candidates (1)

- Jen Deck (2022 candidate for Peterborough—Kawartha)

Total endorsements: 13

== Declined ==
- Jill Andrew, MPP for Toronto—St. Paul's (2018–2025)
- Charlie Angus, MP for Timmins-James Bay (2004–2025)
- Doly Begum, Ontario NDP Deputy Leader (2022–present), MPP for Scarborough Southwest (2018–present)
- Jeff Burch, MPP for Niagara Centre (2018–present)
- Catherine Fife, MPP for Waterloo (2012–present)
- Chris Glover, MPP for Spadina-Fort York (2018–present)
- Wayne Gates, MPP for Niagara Falls (2014–present)
- France Gélinas, MPP for Nickel Belt (2007–present)
- Matthew Green, MP for Hamilton Centre (2019–2025)
- Joel Harden, MPP for Ottawa Centre (2018–2025),
- Faisal Hassan, MPP for York South—Weston (2018–2022)
- Mike Layton, Toronto City Councillor for Ward 11 University—Rosedale (2018–2022) and Ward 19 Trinity—Spadina (2010–2018),
- Laura Mae Lindo, MPP for Kitchener Centre (2018–2023)
- Sol Mamakwa, Ontario NDP Deputy Leader (2022–present), MPP for Kiiwetinoong (2018–present)
- Michael Mantha, MPP for Algoma—Manitoulin (2011–2025)
- Gurratan Singh, MPP for Brampton East (2018–2022)
- Jagmeet Singh, Federal NDP Leader (2017–2025), MP for Burnaby South (2019–2025), MPP for Bramalea—Gore—Malton (2014–2017)
- Jennie Stevens, MPP for St. Catharines (2018–present)
- Peter Tabuns, Ontario NDP Interim Leader (2022–2023), MPP for Toronto–Danforth (2006–present),
- John Vanthof, Ontario NDP Deputy Leader (2018–2022), MPP for Timiskaming—Cochrane (2011–present)
- Jamie West, MPP for Sudbury (2018–present)
- Kristyn Wong-Tam, MPP for Toronto Centre (2022–present), Toronto City Councillor for Toronto Centre (2010–2022)

== Opinion polling ==
=== NDP supporters ===
Polling firm	Last date of polling	Sample size	Link	Margin of error	Jill Andrew	Charlie Angus	Jeff Burch	Wayne Gates	Laura Mae Lindo	Sol Mamakwa	Gurratan Singh	Jennie Stevens	Marit Stiles	Other
Probit Inc.	November 29, 2022	630		± 3.9%	9%	31%	2%	4%	4%	5%	2%	2%	36%	Doly Begum 1% Joel Harden (write-in) 1% Michael Mantha 1% Peter Tabuns (write-in) 1% Jamie West 1% Other 2%
