= 2009 Ontario New Democratic Party leadership election =

Canadian province party leader election

- March 7, 2009
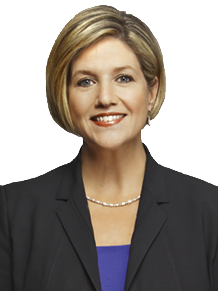

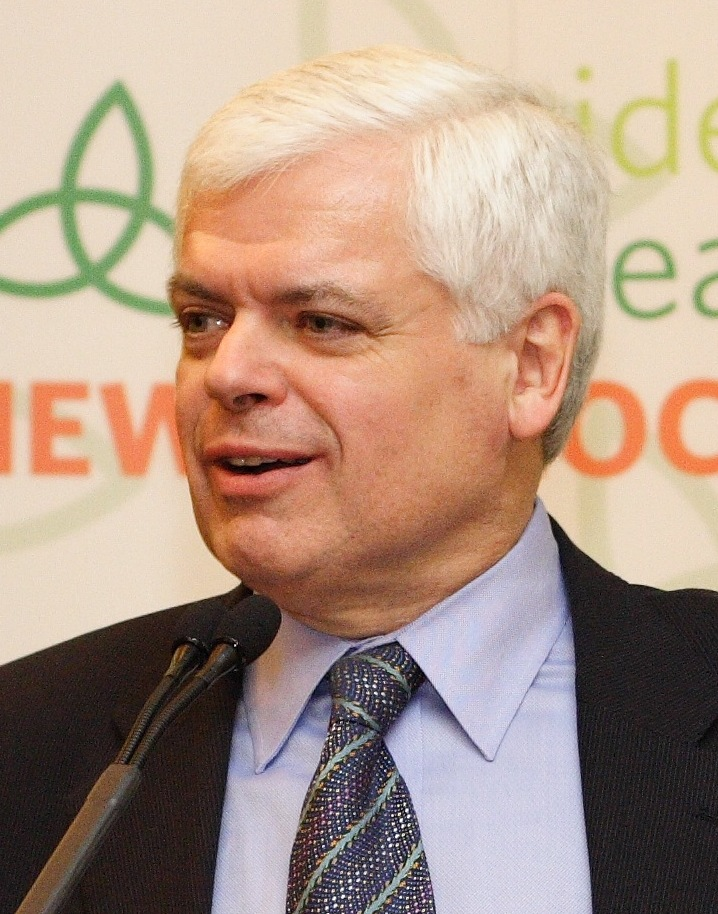

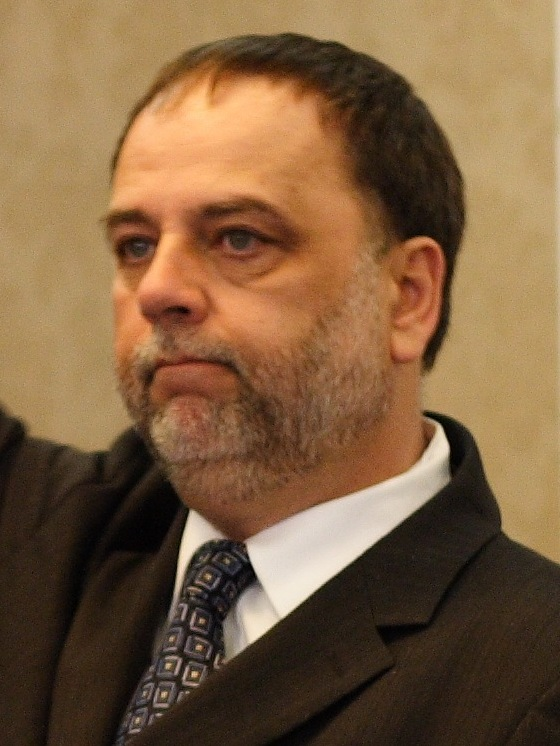

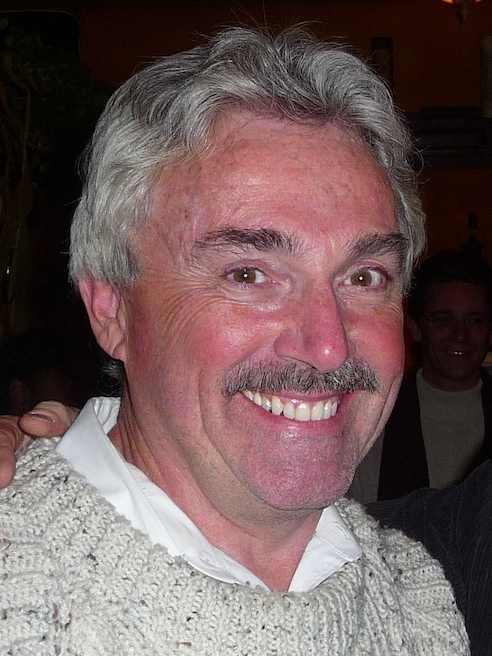
Candidate	Andrea Horwath	Peter Tabuns
Riding	Hamilton Centre	Toronto—Danforth
Final ballot	6,732.34 (60.36%)	4,420.66 (39.64%)
First ballot	4,625.29 (37.13%)	3,437.93 (27.60%)
Candidate	Gilles Bisson	Michael Prue
Riding	Timmins—James Bay	Beaches—East York
Final ballot	Eliminated	Eliminated
First ballot	2,954.23 (23.72%)	1,438.44 (11.55%)
Leader before election
Howard Hampton
Elected Leader
Andrea Horwath

2009 Ontario New Democratic Party leadership election
- Date: March 6–8, 2009
- Convention: Copps Coliseum, Hamilton, Ontario
- Resigning leader: Howard Hampton
- Won by: Andrea Horwath
- Ballots: 3
- Candidates: 4
- Entrance fee: $10,000 (plus a $5,000 refundable deposit)
- Spending limit: $500,000

The 2009 Ontario New Democratic Party leadership election was held in Hamilton, from March 6 to 8, 2009 to elect a successor to Howard Hampton as leader of the Ontario New Democratic Party (NDP). On June 15, 2008, Hampton informed the party's provincial council that he would not stand for re-election as leader at the next party convention in a year's time. While a leadership vote was held at each biennial convention of the Ontario NDP until and including the last regular convention in 2007, there is normally not a contested vote unless there is a vacancy, therefore, the 2009 vote was the party's first leadership convention since Hampton was elected in 1996 to succeed Bob Rae.

With the support of high-profile party members such as the left-wing MPP Peter Kormos and Sid Ryan, the President of CUPE Ontario, Andrea Horwath, the MPP for Hamilton Centre, won the leadership contest with 60.4% of the vote on the final ballot. As of 2022, it remains the last leadership election held by the Ontario New Democratic Party.

== Candidates ==
=== Gilles Bisson ===
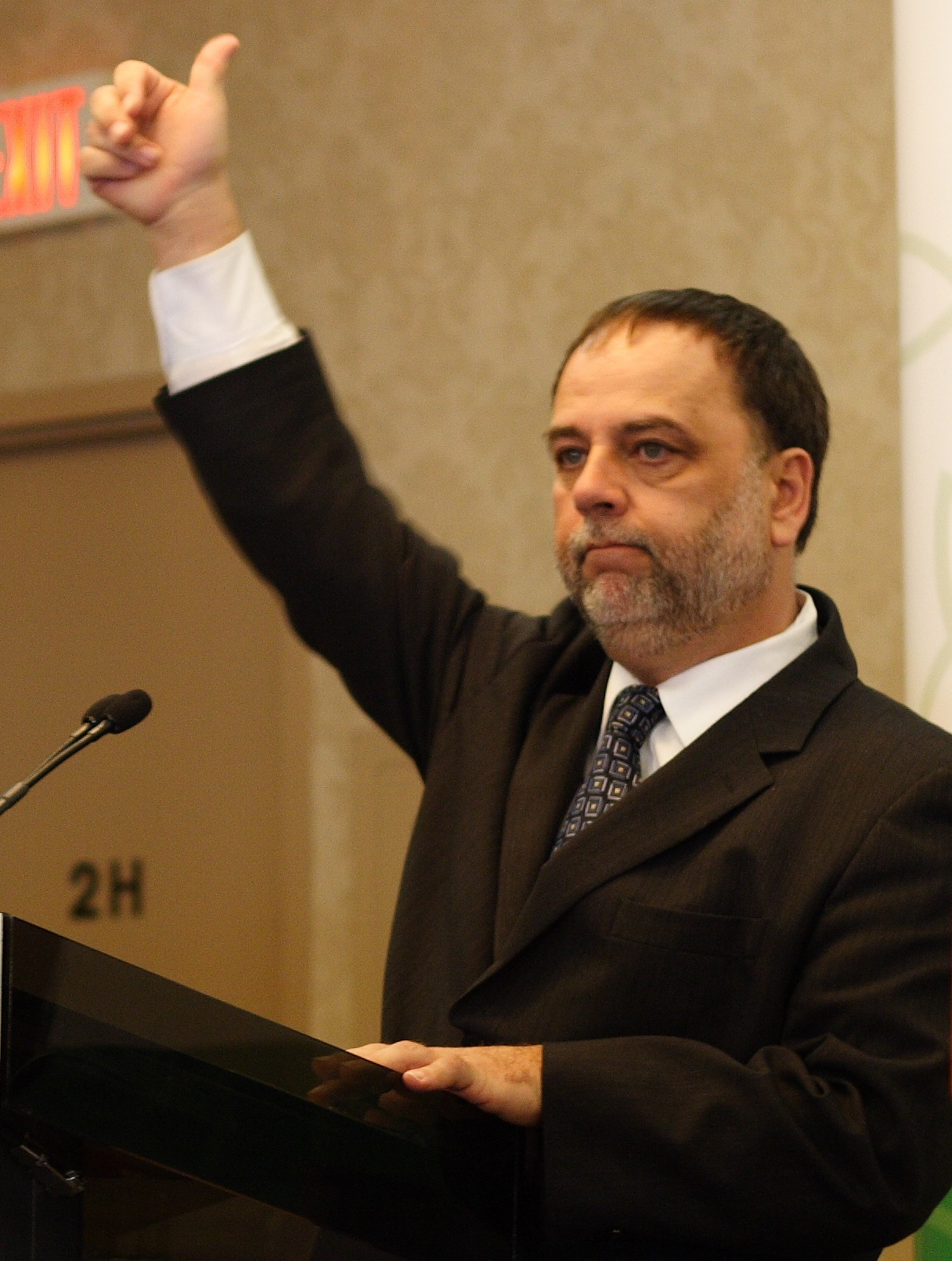
Gilles Bisson

Gilles Bisson is the Member of Provincial Parliament (MPP) for Timmins—James Bay. He was first elected in the 1990 provincial election in the riding of Cochrane South. He served as parliamentary assistant to the Ministers of Northern Development and Mines and Francophone Affairs from 1990 until 1995. He was re-elected by a greater margin in Cochrane South in the 1995 election. He was subsequently re-elected in Timmins—James Bay in the 1999, 2003 and 2007 elections. Before entering politics, he was a labour union organizer.

Date campaign announced: July 14, 2008
Date campaign officially launched: August 28, 2008
Date officially registered: August 27, 2008

Endorsements

- MPs: (7) Charlie Angus (Timmins—James Bay), Claude Gravelle (Nickel Belt), Carol Hughes (Algoma—Manitoulin—Kapuskasing), Bruce Hyer (Thunder Bay—Superior North), Tony Martin (Sault Ste. Marie), John Rafferty (Thunder Bay—Rainy River), Glenn Thibeault (Sudbury)
- MPPs: (1) France Gélinas (Nickel Belt)
- Former MPPs: (1) Wayne Lessard (Windsor—Walkerville, 1990-95; Windsor—Riverside, 1997–99)
- Other prominent individuals: (5) Tania Cameron (federal candidate for Kenora, 2008; Band Manager of Dalles First Nation), Dianna Allen (federal candidate for Nipissing—Timiskaming, 2008), Gord Wilson (President, Ontario Federation of Labour, 1986–97), Fred Upshaw (Former President, Ontario Public Services Employees Union, 1990–95); Dave Killham (executive director, Workers Health and Safety Centre)
- Trade union and other organizations: (1) United Food and Commercial Workers Union

=== Andrea Horwath ===
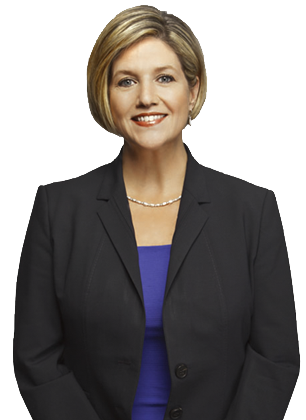
Andrea Horwath

Andrea Horwath is the MPP for Hamilton Centre. She was defeated in the 1997 federal election in Hamilton West, where she finished a distant second place. She was first elected to Hamilton, Ontario City Council in 1997, representing Ward 2. She was re-elected in 2000 and again in 2003. She was first elected to the Ontario legislature in a by-election in 2004 in the riding of Hamilton East with 63.6% of the vote. She was subsequently re-elected in the riding of Hamilton Centre in the 2007 election. Before entering politics, she was a community development worker.

Date campaign announced: July 15, 2008
Date campaign officially launched: November 7, 2008
Date officially registered: September 19, 2008

Endorsements

- MPs: (3) Chris Charlton (Hamilton Mountain), David Christopherson (Hamilton Centre), Malcolm Allen (Welland)
- MPPs: (2) Peter Kormos (Niagara Centre), Rosario Marchese (Trinity—Spadina)
- Municipal politicians: (1) Elaine MacDonald (Cornwall Councillor)
- Other prominent individuals: (5) Wayne Samuelson (President, Ontario Federation of Labour), Leah Casselman (President, Ontario Public Services Employees Union, 1995–2007), Irene Harris (Secretary/Treasurer, Ontario Federation of Labour); Wayne Fraser (Director of District 6 (Ontario and Atlantic Region), United Steel Workers of America); Leo Gerard (President, United Steel Workers of America); Sid Ryan (President, CUPE Ontario)
- Trade union and other organizations: (1) SEIU Local 1

=== Michael Prue ===
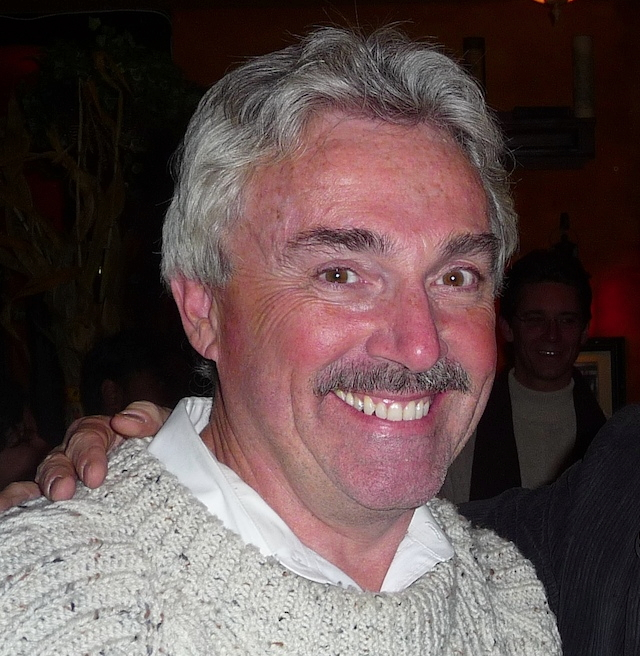
Michael Prue

Michael Prue was the MPP for Beaches—East York. He has been an MPP since 2001 when he defeated Liberal Bob Hunter in a hotly contested by-election. Prue was first elected to public office as a city councillor in 1988, and then became mayor in 1993 of the former Borough of East York. In 1997, East York was amalgamated into the City of Toronto and Prue was elected to Toronto City Council, where he served until his election to the Legislative Assembly of Ontario. Prue was re-elected as MPP of Beaches-East York in 2003, and again in 2007. Prior to entering politics, Prue worked as counsel for the Minister of Employment and Immigration.

Date campaign announced: July 18, 2008
Date campaign officially launched: July 18, 2008
Date officially registered: August 27, 2008

Endorsements

- Former premier: (1) Howard Pawley (Premier of Manitoba, 1981–88)
- MPP: (1) Paul Miller (Hamilton East—Stoney Creek)
- Municipal politicians: () Maria Augimeri (Toronto Ward 9 Councillor), Sandra Bussin (Toronto Ward 32 Councillor, Speaker), Shelley Carroll (Toronto Ward 33 Councillor), Alex Cullen (Ottawa Ward 7 Councillor), Janet Davis (Toronto Ward 31 Councillor), Joe Mihevc (Toronto Ward 21 Councillor), Howard Moscoe (Toronto Ward 15 Councillor)
- Former MPs: (1) Alan Redway (York East, 1984–88; Don Valley East, 1988–93)
- Former MPPs: (6) Jenny Carter (Peterborough, 1990–95), Marilyn Churley (Riverdale, 1990–99; Toronto—Danforth, 1999–2005), Richard Johnston (Scarborough West, 1979–90), Floyd Laughren (Nickel Belt, 1971–98), Gary Malkowski (York East, 1990–95), David William Warner (Scarborough—Ellesmere, 1975–81, 1985–87, 1990–95)
- Other prominent individuals: (2) Darlene Jalbert (NDP candidate, Stormont—Dundas—South Glengarry, 2008), Chris Watson, (former NDP federal secretary)
- Trade union and other organizations: (1) NDP Socialist Caucus

=== Peter Tabuns ===
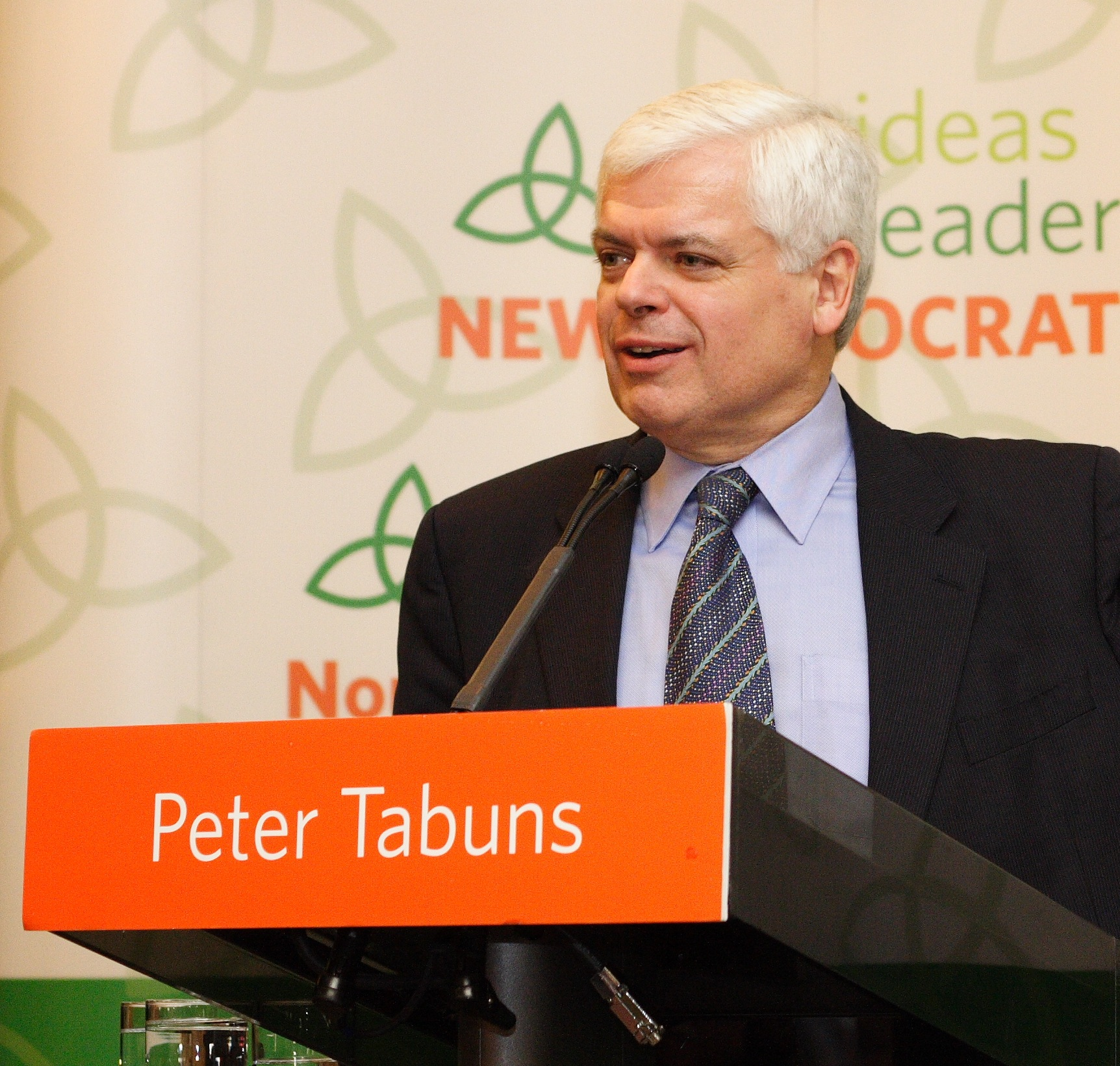
Peter Tabuns

Peter Tabuns is the MPP for Toronto—Danforth. Tabuns served on Toronto City Council from 1990 to 1997 representing Ward 8. He was defeated in 1997 ironically by two NDP affiliated candidates (one of whom being former NDP leader Jack Layton who represented Tabuns' riding in the House of Commons) when Toronto City Council was amalgamated with the Metro Council. From 1999 to 2004 he served as the executive director of Greenpeace Canada. In the 2004 Canadian federal election he ran in the riding of Beaches—East York where he lost to Liberal MP Maria Minna. He received 32% of the vote. He was first elected to the Legislative Assembly of Ontario in a by-election in 2006 in which he received 48% of the vote. He was re-elected in the 2007 election with 46% of the vote, Before entering politics, he was an insurance clerk.

- High-profile supporters:

Date campaign announced: October 26, 2008
Date campaign officially launched: October 26, 2008
Date officially registered: August 15, 2008

Endorsements

- Former party leader: (1) Ed Broadbent (1975–89, federal)
- MPs: (2) Paul Dewar (Ottawa Centre), Irene Mathyssen (London—Fanshawe)
- MPP: (1) Cheri DiNovo (Parkdale—High Park)
- Municipal politician: (1) Paula Fletcher (Toronto Ward 30 Councillor)
- Former MP: (1) Peggy Nash (Parkdale—High Park)
- Other prominent individuals: (4) Michele Landsberg, Michael Lewis (former ONDP and federal NDP secretary), Jill Marzetti, (former Secretary, ONDP), Janet Solberg (former President, ONDP)
- Trade unions and other organizations: (2) Ontario New Democratic Youth, Toronto Steel Workers Council

== Potential candidates who declined to run ==
- Peter Kormos, MPP for Niagara Centre, third-place finisher at the 1996 leadership convention.
- Rosario Marchese, MPP for Trinity-Spadina, former Minister of Culture and Communications.
- Olivia Chow, MP for Trinity—Spadina.
- Brian Masse, MP for Windsor West.
- Leah Casselman, former president of OPSEU.
- Jodie Jenkins, a 2003 and 2007 provincial candidate from Belleville had announced his intention to run.
- Sid Ryan, president of CUPE Ontario, former NDP candidate.
- Charlie Angus, MP for Timmins-James Bay.
- David Christopherson, MP for Hamilton Centre.
- Marilyn Churley, former MPP and cabinet minister.
- Cheri DiNovo, MPP for Parkdale—High Park. DiNovo is quoted saying as saying running for the leadership is "not me, babe" when asked about her intentions.
- France Gélinas, MPP for Nickel Belt. She told Northern Life that she is not running for the position saying: “Though I am flattered by the calls I have received since Howard's announcement, I am a new politician. There is lots to learn as the member for Nickel Belt.”
- Frances Lankin, former MPP and cabinet minister, runner-up at the 1996 leadership convention and, since 2001, president of the United Way for Greater Toronto. She is "not interested" according to the Star.
- Andre Marin, Ombudsman for Ontario. His spokesperson dismissed rumours of his candidacy as wild speculation, adding that he has never been a member of the NDP or had any association with it or any other provincial party, and he intends to serve out his term as ombudsman. In 2016 he ran for the Progressive Conservative Party of Ontario in Ottawa Vanier.
- Tony Martin, MP for Sault Ste. Marie.
- David Miller, Mayor of Toronto and former NDP federal and provincial candidate, has also been mentioned as a possible candidate, although he has not been an NDP member since 2007. The Toronto Star states that Miller is "not interested."
- Peggy Nash, Former MP for Parkdale—High Park. Nash has returned to her former job at the Canadian Auto Workers after deciding against seeking the Ontario NDP leadership, telling the Toronto Star: "Many people have approached me about it. It certainly was something I considered, but the timing was never good. Other candidates had been at this for some time." She has also since accepted the NDP nomination in her former riding of Parkdale-High Park for 42nd Federal Election held on May 2, 2011, which she won.

== Issues ==
Peter Tabuns drew on his environmentalist roots and made his proposal for a "New Energy Economy" based on green principles the centrepiece of his campaign.

Michael Prue raised the idea of reviewing the Separate School System and possibly amalgamating it with the public school system. He also advocated a cities-centred economic policy and giving more power to municipalities. On party issues he advocated giving each riding association $10,000 during elections.

Gilles Bisson emphasized reforms to party fund raising in order to allow riding associations to keep more of the money they raised. In public policy he advocated targeted corporate tax cuts and an anti-crime platform.

Andrea Horwath advocated heavy investment in light rail. In party matters she emphasised a closer relationship to unions and the hiring of regional organisers.

== Procedure ==
In the past, the Ontario NDP has used a traditional delegated leadership convention to select its leaders in which delegates elected by local riding associations, campus clubs, labour union locals affiliated with the party choose the leader. However, at its January 2007 provincial convention, the Ontario NDP amended its constitution bringing in a one member one vote procedure modelled on that used by the New Democratic Party of Canada in its 2003 federal leadership election in which the votes of all party members is weighted to 75% of the total with the remaining 25% being allocated to the party's affiliates (mostly labour unions).

The ONDP constitution (article 9, paragraph 4) stipulates that:

- (a) Every member is entitled to cast a ballot for the election of the Leader.
- (b) The ballots cast by Party members shall be weighted to a total of 75% of the votes counted in a Leadership election, and the balance, 25% of the votes counted in a Leadership election, shall be allocated among the affiliated members.
- (c) At every regular convention that is not a leadership convention, a secret ballot vote will be held to determine whether or not a leadership election should be called. If a majority of the voting delegates supports the calling of a leadership election, such an election will be held within one year of the convention vote.
- (d) The Leader will be chosen by secret ballot. Candidates for the leadership with the fewest weighted votes will drop off the ballot in subsequent rounds until one candidate receives a majority of the total weighted votes cast in that round. Other leadership selection procedures will be determined by Provincial Council.

The party's executive committee finalized the deadlines, spending limits and other rules for the March 2009 election. The spending limit was $500,000 and the cut-off for new members was January 5, 2009. Membership fees were $25 with a reduced rate of $5 for students and the unemployed. The entrance fee for candidates was $15,000 ($5,000 of which was refundable after the election), and the party and candidates were required to provide the signatures of 100 party members, at least half of them women, from all four regions of the province. Candidates were allowed to spend up to $500,000 and 40% of the money candidates raise was to be remitted to the party. Two-time NDP candidate Michael Laxer criticized the entrance fee as being too high, saying: "What you get by doing that is you manifestly limit the number of people who are outside the party establishment, and who have available big backers of one kind or another."

Advance voting was available via mail or internet by preferential ballot. "Real time" voting took place on March 7, 2009, by phone or internet. Those voting on March 7 voted for one candidate only per balloting round. The voting periods were announced at the convention, on the voting website, the voting phone number and on the NDP convention website. On each individual ballot separately with the lowest ranking candidate being dropped off of each successive ballot until one candidate receives a majority of the vote.

== Voting results ==
= Eliminated from next round
= Endorsed another candidate
= Winner

Weighted vote support by ballot
Candidate	1st Ballot		2nd Ballot			3rd Ballot		
Name	Weighted votes	%	Weighted votes	%	+/− (pp)	Weighted votes	%	+/− (pp)
Andrea Horwath	4,625.29	37.1	5,259.06	43.6	+6.5	6,732.34	60.4	+16.8
Peter Tabuns	3,437.93	27.6	3,819.82	31.7	+4.1	4,420.66	39.6	+7.9
Gilles Bisson	2,954.23	23.7	2,988.12	24.8	+1.1	Endorsed Horwath		
Michael Prue	1,438.44	11.5	Eliminated (endorsed Bisson)					
Total	12,455.89	100.0	12,067.00	100.0	-388.89	11,152.90	100.0	-914.10

== Timeline ==
- October 10, 2007 – The 2007 Ontario provincial election is held. The Ontario Liberal Party is re-elected to a second majority government. The NDP, led by Howard Hampton, finishes in third place winning 10 seats and 16.76% of the vote, a 3-seat and 2% popular vote increase over the 2003 election (but no net change on the 10 seats held when the legislature was dissolved; the party gained 3 seats through by-elections between the two elections).
- June 14, 2008 – Ontario NDP leader Howard Hampton informs the party's provincial council that he will not stand for re-election as leader at the next party convention in March 2009.
- July 14, 2008 – MPP Gilles Bisson declares his intention to become a candidate.
- July 15, 2008 – First date that candidates can officially register; campaign officially begins.
- July 15, 2008 – MPP Andrea Horwath declares her intention to become a candidate.
- July 18, 2008 – MPP Michael Prue officially announces his candidacy.
- September 30, 2008 – Deadline for registration for candidates to ensure inclusion in all the party leadership forums and in the information package mailing.
- October 26, 2008 – MPP Peter Tabuns officially launches his campaign.
- November 1, 2008 – Bisson, Horwath, Prue and Tabuns participate in an NDP Socialist Caucus sponsored all-candidates meeting in Toronto; their first debate.
- November 8–9, 2008 – NDP Provincial Council meeting at the Toronto Ramada Inn will decide the specific method of casting ballots for the leadership election; the first official party sponsored leadership debate.
- November 15, 2008 – Second official leadership debate is held in Sudbury.
- November 23, 2008 – Leaders debate at the Ontario New Democratic Youth convention at Ryerson University in Toronto.
- December 6, 2008 – Debate at Ontario NDP Women's Committee Conference, Toronto, 1pm.
- December 13, 2008 – Fourth official debate, Kingston, 10am.
- December 31, 2008 – Deadline for leadership candidates to register.
- January 5, 2009 – Deadline for new and renewed memberships to be received by the provincial office and be eligible to vote in the leadership election.
- January 10, 2009 – Fifth official debate – Timmins – cancelled
- January 17, 2009 – Sixth official debate – Hamilton • 2–4pm, Hamilton Convention Centre, Albion Room
- January 24, 2009 – Seventh official debate – London • 2–4pm, Hilton London, Queen Victoria Room
- January 25, 2009 – Eighth official debate – Windsor – postponed due to recall of the legislature.
- January 28, 2009 – Scarborough, Ontario debate • 7:30 pm, Scarborough Civic Centre council chamber
- January 31, 2009 – Ninth official debate – Ottawa • 2–4pm, Lord Elgin Hotel, Pearson Room
- February 8, 2009 – Tenth official debate – Toronto • 2–4 pm, The Great Hall, 1087 Queen Street West
- February 9, 2009 – Rescheduled eighth official debate • Windsor • 7–9pm Place Concorde – Salon Richelieu • Reception at 6:30pm (rescheduled from January 25)
- February 14, 2009 – Eleventh official debate – Thunder Bay • 1–3 pm, Lakehead Labour Centre, 929 Fort William Road, reception at 12:30pm
- February 23, 2009 – Advance online voting by preferential ballot begins.
- March 3, 2009 – Deadline for mail-in preferential ballots to be returned.
- March 6, 2009 – Leadership convention begins at the Hamilton Convention Centre
  - 7 – 9 pm – Final leadership debate
  - 8 pm – Advance online voting by preferential ballot ends.
- March 7, 2009
  - 11 am – Tribute to Howard Hampton
  - 1 – 3 pm – Leadership candidate speeches
  - 3:30 – 4:15 pm – First ballot "real time" voting online, by phone and in person
  - 4:45 pm – First ballot results announced, Horwath leads followed by Tabuns and Bisson. Prue eliminated, goes to Bisson.
  - 5 – 5:30 pm – Second ballot voting
  - 6 pm – Second ballot results announced. Horwath leads Tabuns. Bisson is eliminated and goes to Horwath.
  - 6:30 – 7 pm – Third ballot voting
  - 7:30 pm – Third ballot results announced – Horwath elected leader of the Ontario NDP; new leader addresses convention
- March 8, 2009 – convention concludes
