= Ontario New Democratic Party candidates in the 1990 Ontario provincial election =

The New Democratic Party of Ontario (NDP) fielded a full slate of candidates in the 1990 provincial election, and won a majority government with 74 out of 130 seats. Many candidates have their own biography pages; information about others may be found here.

== Central Ontario ==
Riding	Candidate's Name	Notes	Residence	Occupation	Votes	%	Rank
Dufferin—Caledon	Sandra Crane				8,627	27.4	3rd
Hastings—Peterborough	Elmer Buchanan				11,283	39.9	1st
Muskoka–Georgian Bay	Dan Waters	ONDP candidate for Muskoka–Georgian Bay in the 1987 provincial election			13,422	40.63	1st
Northumberland	Judi Armstrong				9,581	26.8	3rd
Peterborough	Jenny Carter		Peterborough	Teacher	13,813	33.0	1st
Simcoe Centre	Paul Wessenger	Member of Barrie City Council (1973–1976)		Lawyer	15,711	37.8	1st
Simcoe East	Dennis Bailey				14,088	37.7	2nd
Simcoe West	Leo Loserit				9,870	30.8	2nd
Victoria—Haliburton	Dennis Drainville			Anglican priest	15,467	44.3	1st

== Eastern Ontario/Ottawa ==
Riding	Candidate's Name	Notes	Residence	Occupation	Votes	%	Rank
Carleton	Alex Munter		Kanata	Newspaper editor/Journalist	10,071	26.5	3rd
Carleton East	Joan Gullen				9,976	28.2	2nd
Cornwall	Leo Courville				7,044	26.5	2nd
Frontenac—Addington	Fred Wilson		Kingston	Workers' compensation professional	9,696	33.2	1st
Kingston and the Islands	Gary Wilson		Kingston	Union leader (CUPE)/Librarian	10,184	38.0	1st
Lanark—Renfrew	Harry Martin				8,541	25.1	3rd
Leeds—Grenville	Art Lane				8,312	24.2	3rd
Nepean	John Raudoy				7,453	23.1	3rd
Ottawa Centre	Evelyn Gigantes	Member of Provincial Parliament for Ottawa Centre (1985–1987); Member of Provincial Parliament for Carleton East (1975–1981)		Radio/television broadcaster	14,522	47.7	1st
Ottawa East	Lori Lucier				6,103	23.3	3rd
Ottawa–Rideau	Larry Jones				8,845	29.8	2nd
Ottawa South	Margaret Armstrong				7,826	25.9	2nd
Ottawa West	Allan Edwards				8,391	25.1	3rd
Prince Edward—Lennox	Paul Johnson	Member of Athol Township Council (1988–1990)	Prince Edward	Lawyer	9,204	33.2	1st
Quinte	Greg Meehan				7,010	23.6	2nd
Renfrew North	Ish Theilheimer			Magazine publisher	5,916	19.6	3rd
Stormont—Dundas—Glengarry and East Grenville	Helena McCuaig				5,357	18.4	3rd

== Greater Toronto Area ==
Riding	Candidate's Name	Notes	Residence	Occupation	Votes	%	Rank
Beaches—Woodbine	Frances Lankin				14,381	58.4	1st
Brampton North	John Devries				11,588	34.6	2nd
Brampton South	John Scheer				12,494	31.2	2nd
Burlington South	Bob Wood				8,185	25.2	2nd
Don Mills	Margery Ward				9,740	34.2	1st
Dovercourt	Tony Silipo	Toronto Board of Education Trustee (1978–1990)		Lawyer	10,604	54.2	1st
Downsview	Anthony Perruzza	Member of North York City Councill for Ward 5 (1988–1990); Metropolitan Separate School Board Trustee for Ward 15 (1985–1988)			13,440	56.6	1st
Durham Centre	Drummond White			Social worker	12,594	35.9	1st
Durham East	Gord Mills	Member of Barrie City Council (1976–1982)		Tax auditor	10,960	32.7	1st
Durham West	Jim Wiseman	ONDP candidate for Durham West in the 1987 provincial election	Ajax	Teacher	16,366	37.5	1st
Durham—York	Larry O'Connor			Auto Worker	12,297	33.9	1st
Eglinton	Jay Waterman				7,772	23.2	3rd
Etobicoke–Humber	Russ Springate				10,049	28.6	2nd
Etobicoke—Lakeshore	Ruth Grier	Member of Etobicoke City Council for Mimico (1969–1985)			18,118	57.2	1st
Etobicoke—Rexdale	Ed Philip				17,620	67.0	1st
Etobicoke West	Judy Jones				7,992	23.6	3rd
Fort York	Rosario Marchese				11,023	46.3	1st
Halton Centre	Richard Banigan				10,163	26.4	3rd
Halton North	Noel Duignan		Georgetown	Executive assistant	8,510	30.9	1st
High Park—Swansea	Elaine Ziemba				11,432	45.1	1st
Lawrence	Shalom Schachter				10,179	38.6	2nd
Markham	Rob Saunders				8,459	16.5	3rd
Mississauga East	Mike Crone				9,177	29.0	2nd
Mississauga North	John Foster				11,216	33.5	2nd
Mississauga South	Sue Craig				7,579	23.2	2nd
Mississauga West	Tom Malone				13,938	29.3	2nd
Oakville South	Danny Dunleavy				6,423	20.5	3rd
Oakwood	Tony Rizzo				10,423	48.7	1st
Oriole	Lennox Farrell				8,441	33.2	2nd
Oshawa	Allan Pilkey				16,601	61.1	1st
Parkdale	Sheena Weir				7,557	43.4	2nd
Riverdale	Marilyn Churley				14,086	62.0	1st
Scarborough—Agincourt	Ayoub Ali				6,763	22.5	3rd
Scarborough Centre	Steve Owens				12,324	45.2	1st
Scarborough East	Bob Frankford				11,700	35.5	1st
Scarborough—Ellesmere	David Warner			Teacher	14,036	48.2	1st
Scarborough North	Victor Deane				9,477	31.5	2nd
Scarborough West	Anne Swarbrick				14,340	51.2	1st
St. Andrew—St. Patrick	Zanana Akande				10,321	34.5	1st
St. George—St. David	Carolann Wright				10,646	35.8	2nd
Willowdale	Batya Hebdon				9,125	26.9	3rd
Wilson Heights	John Fagan				9,618	34.7	2nd
York Centre	Laurie Orrett				18,850	30.6	2nd
York East	Gary Malkowski				10,689	35.8	1st
York—Mackenzie	Keith Munro				10,681	31.9	3rd
York Mills	Marcia McVea				4,830	16.5	3rd
York South	Bob Rae				16,642	66.7	1st
Yorkview	Giorgio Mammoliti				9,945	49.6	1st

== Hamilton/Niagara ==
Riding	Candidate's Name	Notes	Residence	Occupation	Votes	%	Rank
Hamilton Centre	David Christopherson	Member of Hamilton City Council (1985–1990)	Hamilton	Union leader (United Auto Workers)	14,029	55.3	1st
Hamilton East	Robert W. Mackenzie	Member of Provincial Parliament for Hamilton East (1975–1995)		Union leader (United Steelworkers)	20,289	71.6	1st
Hamilton Mountain	Brian Charlton	Member of Provincial Parliament for Hamilton Mountain (1977–1995)	Hamilton	Property assessor	22,488	59.8	1st
Hamilton West	Richard Allen	Member of Provincial Parliament for Hamilton West (1982–1995)	Dundas	Professor at McMaster University	18,550	56.6	1st
Lincoln	Ron Hansen			Engineer	12,117	35.5	1st
Niagara Falls	Margaret Harrington				13,884	46.4	1st
Niagara South	Shirley Coppen			Nursing assistant	11,161	46.6	1st
St. Catharines	Dave Kappele				10,629	35.6	2nd
St. Catharines—Brock	Christel Haeck	ONDP candidate for St. Catharines—Brock in the 1987 provincial election		Librarian	9,538	34.7	1st
Welland–Thorold	Peter Kormos	Member of Provincial Parliament for Welland–Thorold (1988–1999)	Welland	Lawyer	20,488	63.6	1st
Wentworth East	Mark Morrow			Lathe operator	15,224	44.6	1st
Wentworth North	Don Abel			Union official (CUPE)	11,472	34.0	1st

== Northern Ontario ==
Riding	Candidate's Name	Notes	Residence	Occupation	Votes	%	Rank
Algoma	Bud Wildman	Member of Provincial Parliament for Algoma (1975–1999)	Echo Bay	Teacher	8,221	58.7	1st
Algoma—Manitoulin	Lori Miller				5,754	37.5	2nd
Cochrane North	Len Wood	ONDP candidate for Cochrane North in the 1987 provincial election		Mechanic	6,618	40.5	1st
Cochrane South	Gilles Bisson		Timmins	Union organizer	11,460	47.6	1st
Fort William	Don Hutsul				10,453	39.4	2nd
Kenora	Doug Miranda				7,821	38.9	2nd
Lake Nipigon	Gilles Pouliot	Member of Provincial Parliament for Lake Nipigon (1985–1999); Mayor of Manitouwadge	Manitouwadge	Miner	8,335	65.2	1st
Nickel Belt	Floyd Laughren	Member of Provincial Parliament for Nickel Belt (1971–1998)	Sudbury	Professor at Cambrian College	9,925	58.5	1st
Nipissing	Dawson Pratt				7,039	20.9	3rd
Parry Sound	Joe Boissonneault				2,993	13.0	4th
Port Arthur	Shelley Wark-Martyn			Nurse	11,919	42.9	1st
Rainy River	Howard Hampton	Member of Provincial Parliament for Rainy River (1987–1999)		Lawyer	7,838	61.5	1st
Sault Ste. Marie	Tony Martin				14,036	36.3	1st
Sudbury	Sharon Murdock			Lawyer	13,407	41.2	1st
Sudbury East	Shelley Martel	Member of Provincial Parliament for Sudbury East (1987–1999)		Insurance professional	17,536	58.0	1st
Timiskaming	Michelle Evans				6,191	31.3	2nd

== Southwestern Ontario ==
Riding	Candidate's Name	Notes	Residence	Occupation	Votes	%	Rank
Brantford	Brad Ward	Member of Brantford City Council (1985–1990)			17,736	48.6	1st
Brantford—Brant	Chris Stanek				9,282	32.2	2nd
Bruce	Len Hope				7,954	26.2	2nd
Bruce—Grey—Owen Sound	Peggy Hutchinson				11,280	29.6	2nd
Cambridge	Mike Farnan	Member of Provincial Parliament for Cambridge (1987–1995)		Teacher	21,806	60.3	1st
Chatham—Kent	Randy Hope	President of the Canadian Auto Workers Local 1941 (1985–1990)	Chatham-Kent	Auto worker	13,930	44.7	1st
Elgin	Peter North		Southwold	Construction contractor	14,189	41.7	1st
Essex–Kent	Pat Hayes	Member of Provincial Parliament for Essex North (1985–1987)		Work safety professional/Union official (CAW)	15,858	52.7	1st
Essex South	Donna Tremblay				10,363	35.3	2nd
Guelph	Derek Fletcher	Wellington County Public School Board Trustee (1985–1990)	Guelph	Press operator	15,051	37.9	1st
Huron	Paul Klopp	ONDP candidate for Huron in the 1987 provincial election ONDP candidate for Huron–Middlesex in the 1985 provincial election	Bluewater	Farmer	10,020	34.5	1st
Kitchener	Will Ferguson	Member of Kitchener City Council (1979–1990)	Kitchener		15,750	46.8	1st
Kitchener—Wilmot	Mike Cooper	ONDP candidate for Kitchener—Wilmot in the 1987 and 1985 provincial elections		Rubber worker	16,056	43.9	1st
Lambton	Ellen MacKinnon	Lambton County Public School Board Trustee (1988–1990); Member of Plympton Town Council (1977–1979)	Lambton County	Farmer	8,691	31.4	1st
London Centre	Marion Boyd	ONDP candidate for London Centre in the 1987 provincial election ONDP candidate for London North in the 1985 provincial election	London		17,837	51.3	1st
London North	Carolyn Davies				14,005	32.0	2nd
London South	David Winninger	ONDP candidate for London South in the 1987 and 1985 provincial elections		Lawyer	17,438	42.4	1st
Middlesex	Irene Mathyssen		Ilderton	Teacher	12,522	32.6	1st
Norfolk	Norm Jamison	ONDP candidate for Norfolk in the 1987 provincial election		Metalworker	14,850	41.0	1st
Oxford	Kimble Sutherland		Ingersoll	University student	12,684	34.7	1st
Perth	Karen Haslam			Teacher	11,712	36.8	1st
Sarnia	Bob Huget	President of Energy and Chemical Workers Union Local 800			10,860	36.7	1st
Waterloo North	Hugh Miller				11,298	29.1	3rd
Wellington	Dale Hamilton				10,837	35.4	2nd
Windsor—Riverside	Dave Cooke	Member of Provincial Parliament for Windsor—Riverside (1977–1997)	Windsor	Social worker	21,144	71.0	1st
Windsor—Sandwich	George Dadamo	ONDP candidate for Windsor—Sandwich in the 1987 provincial election	Windsor	Radio broadcaster	15,952	54.4	1st
Windsor—Walkerville	Wayne Lessard		Windsor	Lawyer	15,899	55.2	1st
