= Ontario New Democratic Party =

Provincial political party in Canada

New Democratic Party of Ontario Nouveau Parti démocratique de l'Ontario
- Abbreviation: NDP; NPD
- Leader: Marit Stiles
- President: Janelle Brady
- Deputy leader: Sol Mamakwa
- House leader: John Vanthof
- Treasurer: Oliver Kent
- Founded: 1961; 65 years ago
- Preceded by: Ontario CCF
- Headquarters: 2069 Lake Shore Boulevard West; Toronto, Ontario; M8V 3Z4
- Youth wing: Ontario New Democratic Youth
- Women's wing: Ontario NDP Women's Committee
- Membership (2017): 52,200
- Ideology: Social democracy Progressivism
- Political position: Centre-left to left-wing
- National affiliation: New Democratic Party
- Colours: Orange
- Slogan: On Your Side (since 2025)
- Provincial Parliament: 27 / 124

Website
- www.ontariondp.ca

The Ontario New Democratic Party (NDP; French: Nouveau Parti démocratique de l'Ontario; NPD) is a social democratic provincial political party in Ontario, Canada. The party sits on the centre-left to left-wing of the left–right political spectrum. It is Ontario's provincial section of the federal New Democratic Party. The party has formed the Official Opposition in Ontario since the 2018 general election.

It was formed in October 1961 from the Co-operative Commonwealth Federation (Ontario Section) (Ontario CCF) and the Ontario Federation of Labour (OFL).

For many years, the Ontario NDP was the most successful provincial NDP branch outside the national party's heartland of Western Canada. It had its first breakthrough under its first leader, Donald C. MacDonald in the 1967 provincial election, when the party elected 20 members of Provincial Parliament (MPPs) to the Ontario Legislative Assembly. After the 1970 leadership convention, Stephen Lewis became leader, and guided the party to Official Opposition status in 1975, the first time since the Ontario CCF did it twice in the 1940s. After the party's disappointing performance in the 1977 provincial election, that included losing opposition status, Lewis stepped down and Michael Cassidy was elected leader in 1978. Cassidy led the party through the 1981 election and stepped down following the disappointing results.

In 1982, Bob Rae was elected leader. Under his leadership, in 1985, the party held the balance-of-power with the signing of an accord with the newly elected Ontario Liberal Party minority government. After the 1987 Ontario general election, the NDP became the Official Opposition again. The 1990 Ontario general election surprisingly produced the NDP's breakthrough first government in 1990. The victory produced the first NDP provincial government east of Manitoba.

During this time, Rae's government brought forward a number of initiatives that were unpopular such as the Social Contract. The 1995 election saw the NDP reduced from a majority government to 17 seats, the lowest number of seats since the 1963 election. Rae stepped down as leader in February 1996.

Howard Hampton was elected leader at the 1996 Hamilton convention and led the party through three elections. Hampton's period as leader saw poor election results causing the NDP to lose official party status twice: after the 1999 and 2003 elections. He was able to regain party status the first time after the governing Progressive Conservatives revised party status requirements in accordance with that election's reduction in the number of seats in the legislature, and the second time after winning a string of by-elections in the mid-2000s. The party maintained party status after the 2007 Ontario general election and he stepped down as leader in 2009.

Andrea Horwath was elected leader at the 2009 leadership convention in Hamilton. Under her leadership in the 2011 Ontario general election, the party elected 17 MPPs to the legislature and grew to 21 in the 2014 Ontario general election. Under Horwath, the party achieved its second highest seat count (other than forming government in 1990) when it formed the Official Opposition with 40 MPPs after the 2018 Ontario general election. This dropped to 31 MPPs after the 2022 Ontario general election, with Horwath announcing her resignation as leader.

Marit Stiles replaced Horwath after she was acclaimed leader at the 2023 leadership election. She led the party into the 2025 Ontario general election, winning 27 seats and forming the Official Opposition for the third consecutive time, a first in party history, albeit a reduced vote share.

== History ==
=== Origins as the Ontario CCF ===
The NDP's predecessor, the Co-operative Commonwealth Federation (CCF), was a democratic socialist political party, founded in 1932. The Ontario CCF in turn was indirectly the successor to the 1919–23 United Farmers of Ontario–Labour coalition that formed the government of Ontario under Ernest C. Drury.

As the Ontario Co-operative Commonwealth Federation (Ontario Section) under Ted Jolliffe as their first leader, the party nearly won the 1943 provincial election, winning 34 seats and forming the official opposition for the first time. Two years later, they would be reduced to eight seats. The final glory for the Ontario CCF came in the 1948 provincial election, when party elected 21 MPPs, and again formed the official opposition. They were even able to defeat Premier George A. Drew in his own constituency, when the CCF's Bill Temple won in High Park, even though the Progressive Conservative Party of Ontario won another majority government. In 1951, the Ontario CCF was reduced to two MPP's in that year's provincial election. In the two remaining elections while it existed, the party never had more than five members in the legislature. Jolliffe resigned as leader in 1953.

=== End of the CCF/New Party and revival ===
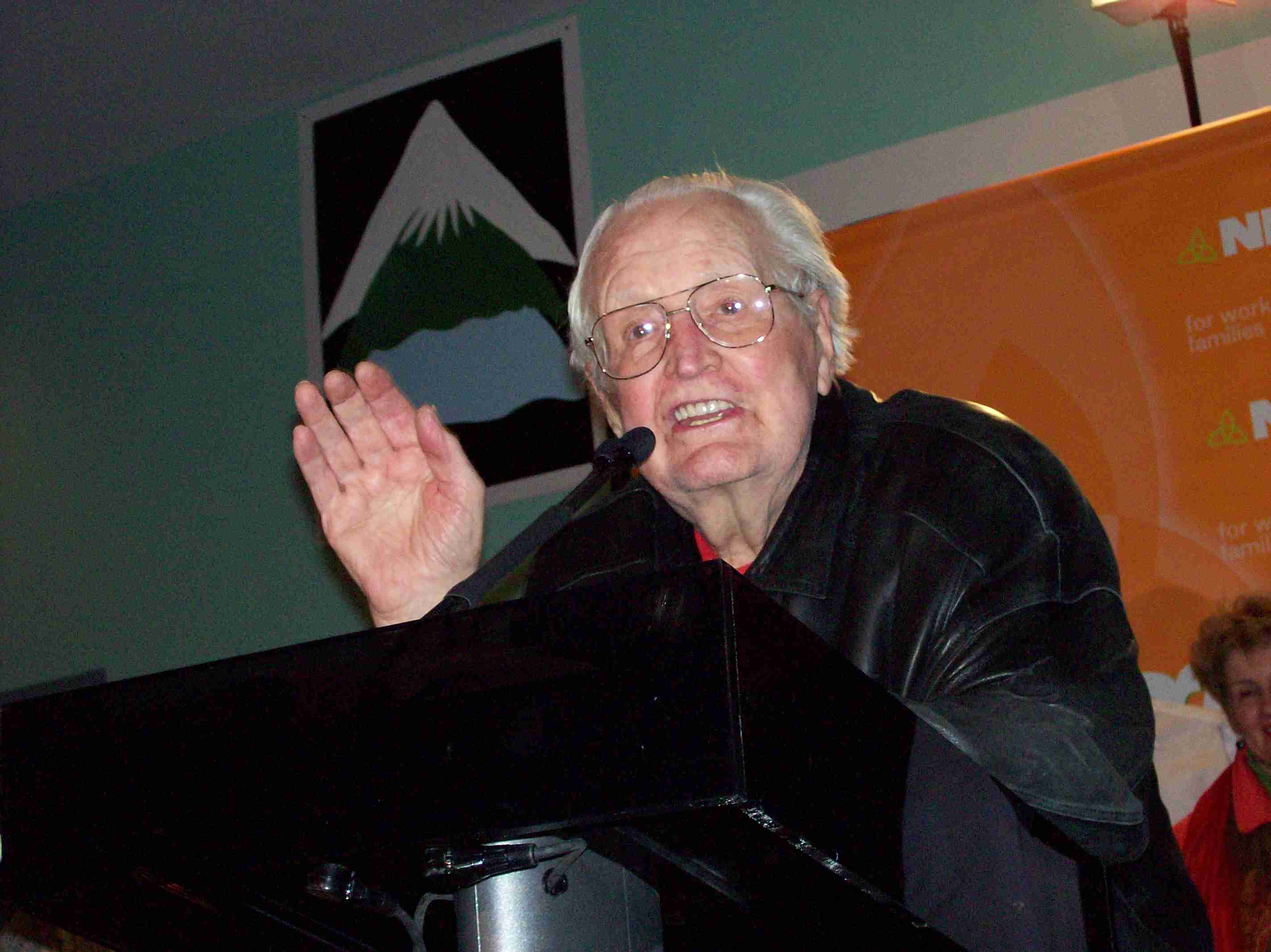
Donald C. MacDonald, CCF/NDP Leader from 1953 to 1970. Seen here in February 2007.

Donald C. MacDonald became leader in 1953, and spent the next fifteen years rebuilding the party, from two seats when he took over the party's helm, to ten times that number when he stepped down in 1970. Delegates from the Ontario CCF, delegates from affiliated union locals, and delegates from New Party Clubs took part in the founding convention of the New Democratic Party of Ontario held in Niagara Falls at the Sheraton Brock hotel from 7–9 October 1961 and elected MacDonald as their leader. The Ontario CCF Council ceased to exist formally on Sunday, 8 October 1961, when the newly elected NDP executive officially took over.

The Ontario NDP gradually picked up seats through the 1960s. It achieved a breakthrough in the 1967 provincial election, when its popular vote rose from 15% to 26%. The party increased its presence in the legislature from 8 to 20 seats. In that election the party ran on the themes of the cost of living, tax distribution, education costs, Canadian unity, and affordable housing.

=== Official Opposition under Stephen Lewis ===
Stephen Lewis took over the party's leadership in 1970, and the NDP's popularity continued to grow. With the 1975 provincial election, the governing Progressive Conservative party was reduced to a minority government for the first time in thirty years. The charismatic and dynamic Lewis ran a strong election campaign that forced the Tories to promise to implement the NDP's rent control policies. The NDP overtook the Liberals to become the Official Opposition with 38 seats and 29% of the vote. However, the Tories retained power as a minority government.

Hopes were high that the NDP was on the verge of taking power. However, in the 1977 provincial election, the Tories under Bill Davis again won a minority government. The NDP lost five seats; they also slipped into third place behind the Ontario Liberal Party. A frustrated Lewis resigned shortly afterwards.

=== Third-party status under Michael Cassidy ===
Michael Cassidy was elected leader, but being the most left-wing of the three leadership candidates, he was not fully trusted by the party establishment. Cassidy's policy advisor in the leadership campaign was James Laxer, a former leader of The Waffle NDP faction which Lewis had expelled from the party in 1972. Some members of the NDP caucus considered Cassidy's election as a serious mistake, and encouraged him to resign before contesting an election. Cassidy ignored this advice, and remained as leader. The NDP declined further in the 1981 provincial election and Cassidy stepped down.

The party's fortunes turned around under the leadership of Bob Rae. The NDP captured two by-elections at the cost of the Liberals. In late 1984, polls showed Rae's NDP ahead of the David Peterson-led Liberals.

=== Opposition then Government under Bob Rae ===
The 1985 provincial election resulted in a minority legislature: the Tories under incumbent Premier Frank Miller won 52 seats, the Liberals won 48, and the NDP 25. The New Democrats entered negotiations with both the Tories and the Liberals. The NDP signed a two-year accord with the Liberals, in which the Liberals would form government with the NDP's support in exchange for the implementation of a number of NDP policies. This was not a coalition government as the NDP declined an offer to sit in Cabinet, preferring to remain in opposition. The governing Tories were defeated by a non-confidence motion and Miller resigned.

When the accord expired in 1987, Premier David Peterson called an early provincial election and the Liberals were re-elected with a large majority. The NDP lost seats but emerged as the largest opposition party, with Bob Rae becoming Leader of the Opposition.

1990 Ontario NDP landslide victory

Shortly before the 1990 provincial election, the governing Liberals held a solid lead in the polls, though their popularity had tailed off from 1987. However, Peterson's government was soon mired in scandals and many regarded the early election call as cynical. Under Rae, the NDP ran a strong campaign, which was also aided by a successful showing for federal New Democratic Party a couple years earlier. Although the NDP finished only three percentage points ahead of the Liberals, they managed to take many seats in the Greater Toronto Area (GTA) away from the Liberals. As a result, the NDP won a large majority government of 74 seats while the Liberals suffered the worst defeat in their history.

Bob Rae became Premier of Ontario during the early 1990s recession, the worst economic downturn since the Great Depression. In government, the NDP disappointed supporters by abandoning much of its ambitious program, including the promise to institute a public auto insurance system. As the recession worsened, the NDP implemented what it called the Social Contract – this was a package of austerity measures that:

- reopened the collective bargaining agreements of public sector unions;
- implemented a wage freeze for public servants; and
- imposed Rae Days, which were a schedule of days in which government workers were given days off without pay.

The Social Contract resulted in a major breach in the NDP's alliance with the labour movement as several trade unions turned against the party. Rae's government passed employment equity legislation and amended the province's labour law to ban the use of replacement workers during strikes, but this did not win back union support.

At one point, the NDP fell to a low of six percent support in polling. An ominous sign for the party came in the 1993 federal election. All 10 of the federal NDP's Ontario MPs lost their seats to Liberal Party of Canada challengers by large margins. It was obvious by the 1995 provincial election that Rae's government would not be re-elected. The official opposition Ontario Liberals under Lyn McLeod were initially the beneficiaries of the NDP's unpopularity, but their poor campaign saw the momentum swing to the resurgent Tories under Mike Harris, who vaulted from third in the legislature to win a large majority. The NDP fell down to 17 seats, third place in the Legislative Assembly. In 1996, Rae stepped down as party leader and resigned his seat in the legislature.

Despite these shortcomings, the Rae years did witness a number of reforms in the field of social welfare being enacted. In 1991, the Rae government increased basic social assistance rates by 7% and shelter rates by 10%. Single parents were uploaded from the municipalities and all lone parents were raised to the same income standard. In 1992 and 1993, the Rae government implemented successive increases to social assistance.

Rae since joined the Liberal Party of Canada and was an unsuccessful candidate for party leadership in December 2006 and December 2008, but went on to serve as interim leader following Michael Ignatieff's resignation in 2011 until Justin Trudeau was chosen in 2013.

=== Post-government under Howard Hampton ===
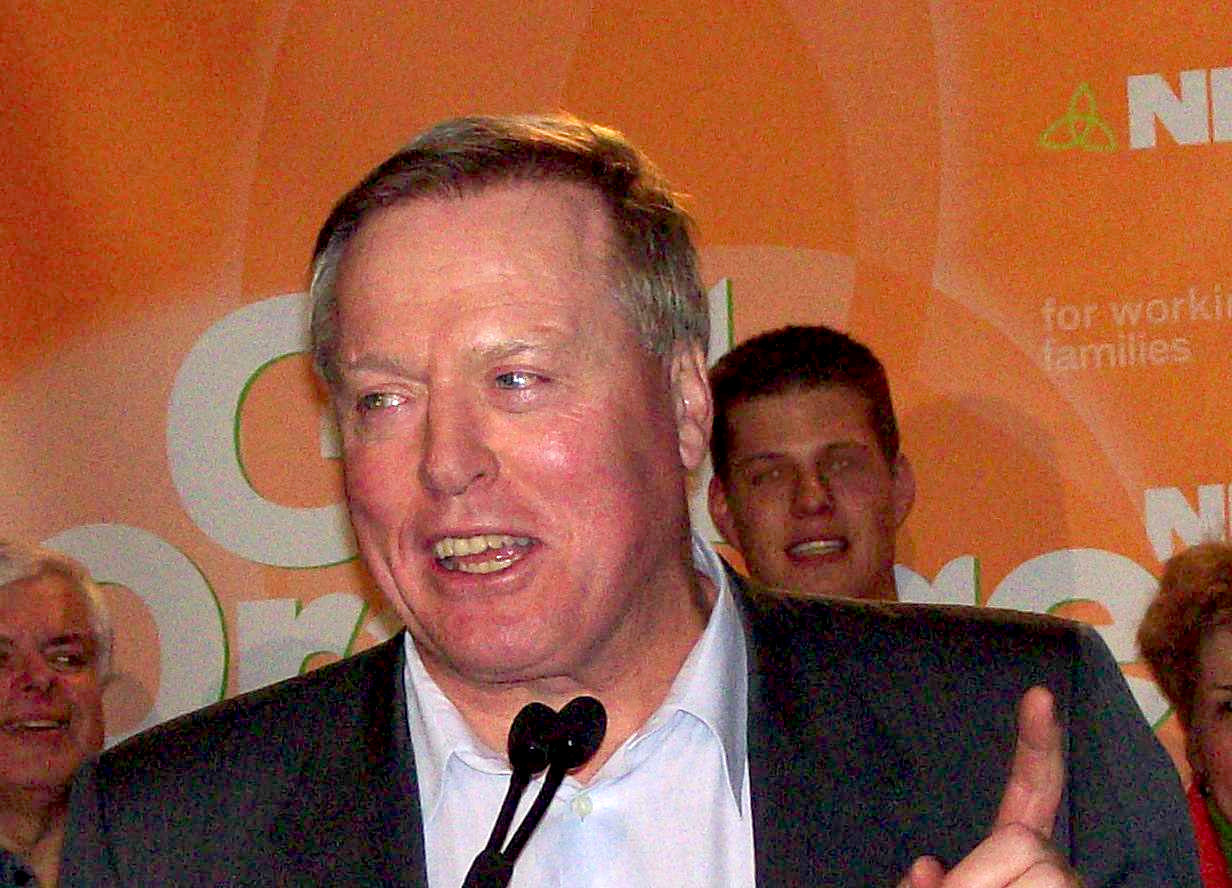
Ontario NDP leader Howard Hampton in February 2007

Rae was succeeded by Bud Wildman as interim leader in 1996, until Howard Hampton defeated Frances Lankin, a member of Rae's inner circle, for the party leadership that same year.

Under Hampton, the party largely repudiated Rae's policies and renewed its commitment to a moderate form of socialism. Shortly after the 1999 provincial election, Hampton cited the Swedish model of social democracy as closely reflecting his own beliefs.

Ontario NDP support fell even further in the 1999 provincial election, leaving the party with just nine seats. However, this was largely due to tactical voting in which NDP supporters voted Liberal in hopes of removing Harris and the Tories from power. As a result, Hampton was not blamed for this severe defeat and stayed on as leader.

Under the rules of the Legislative Assembly, a party would receive official party status, and the resources and privileges accorded to officially recognized parties, if it had 12 or more seats; thus, it initially appeared the NDP would lose caucus funding and the ability to ask questions in the House. However, the governing Progressive Conservatives changed the rules after the election to lower the threshold for party status from 12 seats to 8. The Progressive Conservatives had reduced the size of the legislature, so provincial ridings now had the same boundaries as the federal ones, and so the official party status threshold was lowered. Some suggested that the Tories helped the NDP so they could continue to split the vote with the Liberals, although the Progressive Conservatives had stated before the election campaign even began that reducing official party status to eight seats was part of the seat reduction plan from the very beginning.

==== 2003 election: losing official party status ====
In the 2003 election, the party emphasized their "Public Power Campaign", which had two key issues, primarily publicly owned electricity generation and distribution, and publicly run auto insurance. As well, the Public Power Campaign also dealt with rolling-back the social program cuts from the Harris government's Common Sense Revolution. Many media outlets – including The Globe and Mail – thought that party leader Howard Hampton performed strongly in the televised leaders' debate. Despite Hampton's debate performance and a 2.4% increase in the popular vote, the party lost two seats, once again losing official party status and their previous speaking privileges and funding. One of the problems that likely affected NDP support was strategic voting, not unlike that of the 1999 election. Dozens of NDP voters voted Liberal in order to ensure that the Tories would be defeated. This voting practice did do damage to the NDP's electoral fortunes because it was interpreted as a call for blanket support for Liberal candidates over NDP candidates, with no real thought to which candidate had a better chance to defeat a PC in any individual riding. Several unions, such as the Canadian Auto Workers (CAW), promoted strategic voting to their membership and the public, which further added to the party's woes. The newly elected Liberal government offered to give the NDP caucus research funding if their members agreed to sit as independents. Hampton refused and disrupted the government Throne Speech in protest.

==== By-elections: regaining official party status ====
The first by-election in the 38th Legislative Assembly of Ontario, was in the riding of Hamilton East, caused by the untimely death of the riding's MPP, Dominic Agostino, on 24 March 2004. This tragic event, in conjunction with a recent and unpopular tax increase by the Liberals, provided the NDP with an opportunity to regain party status. A by-election was called for 13 May 2004, in which the new Liberal candidate, Agostino's brother Ralph, was challenged by NDP candidate Andrea Horwath, a Hamilton city councillor. The NDP extensively campaigned to win this seat, aided by the city's large base of unionized steelworkers. On election night, Horwath took 63.8 per cent of the vote in the seat, bringing the NDP back to eight seats in the legislature and allowing them to regain official party status.

The Ontario NDP's representation in the legislature was again reduced to seven seats when Marilyn Churley resigned her seat to run in the 2006 federal election. However, the Liberals reversed their position and declared that the NDP would retain party status even if they lost the upcoming Toronto—Danforth by-election. Some opposition sources believed the Liberals, mindful of their humiliating defeat to Horwath, had loosened their interpretation of the rules so that whoever ran for the NDP in Toronto—Danforth couldn't use the threat of lost status in a campaign. This issue became moot when, on 30 March 2006, NDP candidate Peter Tabuns won the by-election in the Toronto—Danforth riding by a 9% margin over the Liberals' Ben Chin, alleviating another party status crisis.

The NDP scored a surprise victory over the Liberals in the late summer of that year in the riding of Parkdale—High Park. Liberal Education Minister Gerard Kennedy resigned on 5 April 2006 to run for the Federal Liberal Party leadership. The government took an unusually long time to call the by-election, waiting until 16 August to drop the writ. It turned into one of the most vicious elections in recent Ontario memory, almost on par with Jolliffe's 1945 "Gestapo" campaign. This time though, the NDP were not making the accusations; NDP candidate Cheri DiNovo's credibility was put to the test by what most of the media considered to be unworthy and underhanded personal attacks launched by the Liberals. The tactic backfired; on 14 September 2006, DiNovo defeated Liberal candidate – and incumbent Toronto city councillor – Sylvia Watson by taking 41% of the popular vote to Watson's 33%.

In the riding of York South—Weston, adjacent to Parkdale—High Park and once the seat of former leaders Bob Rae, Donald C. MacDonald and Ted Jolliffe, the NDP continued its string of recent by-election successes by taking away another Liberal stronghold. On 8 February 2007, Paul Ferreira narrowly defeated Liberal candidate Laura Albanese by 358 votes, or 2%. This victory increased the NDP caucus' seat total to ten, up by three since the October 2003 general election.

==== 2007 Ontario general election ====
Party logo (2007–2010)

In the 2007 provincial election, the party increased its share of the popular vote by two percent but did not make any gains in the legislature, with the loss of Paul Ferreira in York South—Weston being offset by the victory of Paul Miller in Hamilton East—Stoney Creek. France Gélinas also successfully retained the riding of Nickel Belt, following the retirement of Shelley Martel. The other eight NDP ridings were all retained by their incumbent MPPs.

Early polling in September 2006 showed the party with 27% support, its highest recorded level since 1992. By early 2007 support had fallen to 17% support, further behind the two front-running parties but still slightly ahead of the party's 15% result in the 2003 election. September 2007 polling had the NDP at 14%, while the 29 September Ipsos poll had them at 17%, meaning that NDP's support had been constant for a year within the margin of error. Though the same Ipsos poll suggested that the NDP would elect 12 members to the legislature, the party would eventually elect only 10.

On 14 June 2008, Hampton announced he would be stepping down as leader at the 2009 leadership election.

=== Resurgence under Andrea Horwath ===
Party logo (until 2025)

On 7 November 2008, Andrea Horwath officially launched her campaign to win the party's leadership. Horwath advocated heavy investment in light rail. In party matters, she emphasised a closer relationship to unions and the hiring of regional organisers. The leadership election was held 6–8 March 2009. Horwath led on the first two ballots, and won on the third ballot with 60.4% of the vote.

In the lead-up to the 2011 election, Horwath began to campaign on tax incentives for businesses that create jobs in the province, making investments that improve health-care wait times, and cutting the Harmonized Sales Tax from necessities such as home-heating and gas. Instead of providing broad corporate tax cuts, Horwath would have focused on tax cuts for small businesses and companies that make investments in Ontario. Her campaign also criticized the McGuinty government for not soliciting competitive bids for green energy projects, and pledged to have a public bidding process where preference is given to local providers.

Horwath distanced the Ontario NDP from former Premier Bob Rae, then the interim leader of the federal Liberal Party of Canada, by pointing out that he is the exception to the rule of NDP Premiers in other provinces who have been able to balance provincial budgets. At the official televised leaders' debate, her political rivals criticized the Ontario NDP's handling of the economy in the early 1990s, but Horwath further distanced the party from Rae by pointing out his current allegiance to the federal Liberals as interim leader of the (federal) Liberal Party. Her campaign largely refrained from mudslinging and personal attacks, and she led her party to an increase from 10 seats to 17 seats in the legislature. The Liberals were re-elected with a minority government giving Horwath's NDP the balance of power in the legislature.

At an automatic leadership review held at the party's provincial convention in April 2012, 76.4% of delegates voted in favour of Horwath's continued leadership.

In September 2012, NDP candidate Catherine Fife won a by-election in the riding of Kitchener—Waterloo after the resignation of former Progressive Conservative MPP Elizabeth Witmer. Fife's victory increased the NDP caucus to a total of 18 seats in the provincial legislature.

Further by-election victories in ridings formerly held by the Liberals included Peggy Sattler in London West and Percy Hatfield in Windsor—Tecumseh in August 2013, and Wayne Gates in Niagara Falls. This increased the NDP caucus to 21 members in the Legislative Assembly.

=== Breakthrough as Official Opposition ===
2018 Ontario general election - Seat summary
PC	61.29%
New Democratic	32.26%
Others	6.46%

At the 2018 provincial election, the NDP ended 23 years of third party status, winning 40 seats to become the official opposition–the party's best showing since winning government in 1990. Notably, they took all of Old Toronto (i.e., what was the city of Toronto before the 1998 amalgamation) and took eight seats in Northern Ontario. They also took all but one seat each in Hamilton and Niagara.

At the leadership review held in June 2019 during a policy convention, Horwath received support from 84% of delegates.

Horwath resigned after the party suffered due to historically low voter turnout in the 2022 Ontario general election. Peter Tabuns was chosen interim leader on 28 June 2022.

=== Official Opposition under Marit Stiles (2023–present) ===
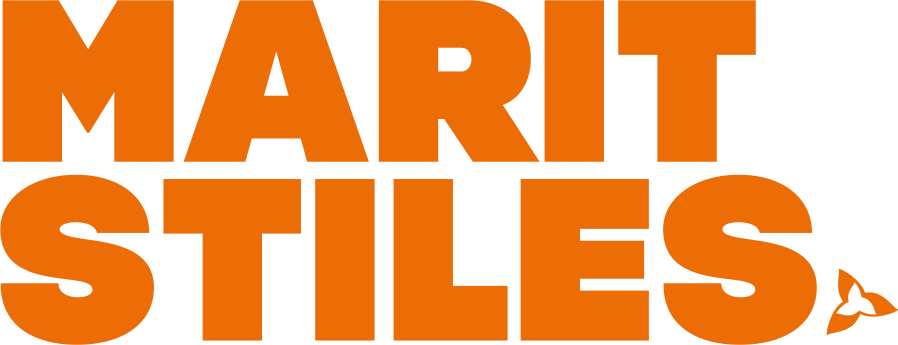

After the interim leadership of Peter Tabuns, Marit Stiles was declared Ontario NDP leader by a majority vote at an event in Downtown Toronto on 4 February 2023.

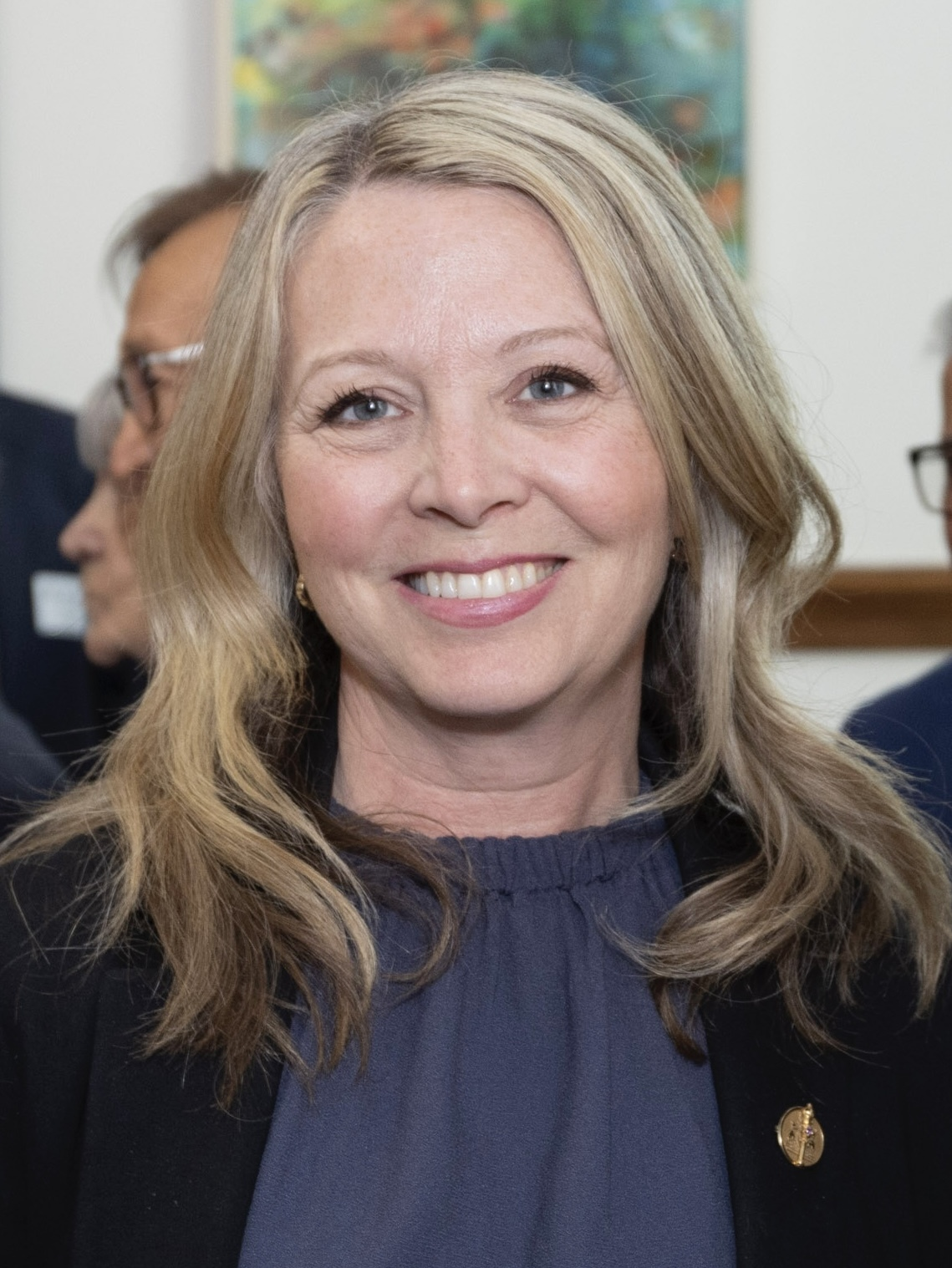
Stiles as been party leader and the provincial leader of the Official Opposition since 2023

In October 2023, Hamilton Centre MPP Sarah Jama was removed from the NDP caucus for allegedly failing to abide by the terms of an agreement between herself and Stiles. Jama was accused of taking a "number of unilateral actions" without party endorsement, which included making statements regarding the Gaza war; being uncooperative with NDP colleagues; and threatening Premier Doug Ford with legal action without first consulting her caucus. Stiles had originally defended Jama, and had met privately with Jama beforehand, asking her to remove her statement and apologize. Jama subsequently apologized for her posts but, in defiance of the party's directive, refused to remove the statement, instead pinning it to the top of her feed on X. Jama said: "I don't plan on apologizing..." The NDP was divided over the issue. Some in the NDP stated that Jama should have been ejected sooner for refusing to remove her statement; some were critical of the political damage that resulted from the delay in expelling Jama with one MPP having to be convinced not to quit the NDP over the delay; while others criticized Stiles for her decision to remove Jama from caucus including two constituency associations that demanded Stiles resign as leader. During the 2025 provincial election, the NDP under Stiles remained Official Opposition and won 27 seats. In addition, the party held onto all six of its downtown Toronto seats.

On 3 February 2026, ONDP deputy leader Doly Begum resigned to run as a federal Liberal by-election candidate; the party held the seat in the 2026 Scarborough Southwest provincial by-election.

In September 2026, the Hamilton East—Stoney Creek provincial by-election saw Monique Taylor bring the ONDP from 17.60% to 32.90% of the vote, coming second to PCs at 38.87%. Liberals only received 23.4% and lost the popular vote as well.

== Ideology ==
The party has been described as social democratic and progressive, rooted in egalitarian principles. It supports a mixed economy, targeted market intervention, expansive welfare state, and robust public sector, while opposing big business and privatization.

As of 2025, the Ontario NDP supports pursuing electoral reform to replace first-past-the-post with a proportional representation system such as mixed-member proportional.

It is historically pro-labour and pro-union, frequently emphasizing workers' rights.

== Party leaders ==
The party was known as the Ontario section of the Co-operative Commonwealth Federation until the New Democratic Party's founding convention on 8 October 1961, at which point Donald C. MacDonald ceased to be the CCF leader and became the Ontario NDP leader.

=== CCF ===
#	Party leader	Tenure	Notes
*	Agnes McPhail	1932–1934 (party chairman and co-spokesman)	Concurrently a United Farmers of Ontario federal MP. Served in Ontario legislature as a CCF MPP (1943–1945, 1948–1951).
*	Elmore Philpott	1933–1934 (CCF clubs president and co-spokesman)	Previously a candidate for the Ontario Liberal Party leadership in 1930. Rejoined the Liberals in 1935. Served as a federal Liberal MP from 1953 to 1957.
*	John Mitchell	1934–1941 (party president and spokesman)	Concurrently an alderman on Hamilton, Ontario city council for part of this time.
*	Samuel Lawrence	1934–1937 (leader in the legislature); 1941–1942 (party president and spokesman)	First CCFer elected to the Ontario legislature and sole CCF MPP until his defeat in 1937. Later served as Mayor of Hamilton, Ontario (1944–1949).
1	E.B. (Ted) Jolliffe	1942–1953	Leader of the Opposition 1943–1945, 1948–1951. First official CCF leader.
2	Donald C. MacDonald	1953–1961	

=== NDP ===
#	Party Leader	Tenure	Notes
1	Donald C. MacDonald	8 October 1961 – 4 October 1970	
2	Stephen Lewis	4 October 1970 – 5 February 1978	Leader of the Opposition 1975–1977. Subsequently served as Canadian Ambassador to the United Nations (1984–1988)
3	Michael Cassidy	5 February 1978 – 7 February 1982	Later a federal NDP MP (1984–1988)
4	Bob Rae	7 February 1982 – 22 June 1996	Leader of the Opposition 1987–1990, First Ontario NDP Premier 1990–1995. Previously a federal NDP MP (1978–1982). Later joined the federal Liberals and was a federal Liberal MP (2008–2013), Liberal leadership candidate (2006) and interim Liberal leader (2011–2013). Appointed Canadian Ambassador to the United Nations in 2020.
*	Bud Wildman	10 February – 22 June 1996 (caucus leader)	Parliamentary leader of the NDP caucus in the legislature between Rae's resignation as an MPP and Hampton's election
5	Howard Hampton	22 June 1996 – 7 March 2009	
6	Andrea Horwath	7 March 2009 – 28 June 2022	Leader of the Opposition, 2018–2022. Later Mayor of Hamilton (2022–present)
*	Peter Tabuns	28 June 2022 – 4 February 2023	Leader of the Opposition, 2022–2023
7	Marit Stiles	4 February 2023 – present	Leader of the Opposition, 2023–present

== Election results ==
Results include those of the Co-operative Commonwealth Federation (CCF). The CCF essentially became the New Democratic Party (NDP) on 8 October 1961.

=== Legislative Assembly ===
Election	Leader	Votes	%	Seats	+/−	Position	Status
1934	John Mitchell		7.0	1 / 90	▲1	▲3rd	Third party
1937	John Mitchell		5.6	0 / 90	▼1	▼ none	No seats
1943	Ted Jolliffe		31.7	34 / 90	▲34	▲2nd	Opposition
1945	Ted Jolliffe		22.4	8 / 90	▼26	▼3rd	Third party
1948	Ted Jolliffe		27.0	21 / 90	▲13	▲2nd	Opposition
1951	Ted Jolliffe		19.1	2 / 90	▼19	▼3rd	Third party
1955	Donald C. MacDonald		16.5	3 / 98	▲1	3rd	Third party
1959	Donald C. MacDonald		16.7	5 / 98	▲2	3rd	Third party
1963	Donald C. MacDonald		15.5	7 / 108	▲2	3rd	Third party
1967	Donald C. MacDonald		25.9	20 / 117	▲13	3rd	Third party
1971	Stephen Lewis		27.1	19 / 117	▼1	3rd	Third party
1975	Stephen Lewis		28.9	38 / 125	▲19	▲2nd	Opposition
1977	Stephen Lewis	940,691	28.0	33 / 125	▼5	▼3rd	Third party
1981	Michael Cassidy	672,824	21.2	21 / 125	▼12	3rd	Third party
1985	Bob Rae	865,507	23.8	25 / 125	▲4	3rd	Third party (1985)
1985	Bob Rae	865,507	23.8	25 / 125	▲4	3rd	Confidence and supply (1985–1987)
1987	Bob Rae	970,813	25.7	19 / 130	▼6	▲2nd	Opposition
1990	Bob Rae	1,509,506	37.6	74 / 130	▲55	▲1st	Majority
1995	Bob Rae	854,163	20.6	17 / 130	▼58	▼3rd	Third party
1999	Howard Hampton	551,009	12.6	9 / 103	▼8	3rd	Third party
2003	Howard Hampton	660,730	14.7	7 / 103	▼1	3rd	No status^{§}
2007	Howard Hampton	741,043	16.8	10 / 107	▲3	3rd	Third party
2011	Andrea Horwath	980,204	22.7	17 / 107	▲7	3rd	Third party
2014	Andrea Horwath	1,144,576	23.7	21 / 107	▲4	3rd	Third party
2018	Andrea Horwath	1,925,512	33.6	40 / 124	▲19	▲2nd	Opposition
2022	Andrea Horwath	1,072,769	23.7	31 / 124	▼9	2nd	Opposition
2025	Marit Stiles	931,796	18.3	27 / 124	▼4	2nd	Opposition

^{§}Regained official party status after a 2004 by-election.

== Current Ontario New Democrat MPPs ==
Member	District	Elected	Notes
Marit Stiles	Davenport	2018	Party leader and Leader of the Opposition, 2023 – present
Robin Lennox	Hamilton Centre	2025	
Sandy Shaw	Hamilton West—Ancaster—Dundas	2018	
Tom Rakocevic	Humber River—Black Creek	2018	
Sol Mamakwa	Kiiwetinoong	2018	Deputy leader, 2022 – present
Teresa Armstrong	London—Fanshawe	2011	
Terence Kernaghan	London North Centre	2018	
Peggy Sattler	London West	2013	
Guy Bourgouin	Mushkegowuk—James Bay	2018	
Jeff Burch	Niagara Centre	2018	
Wayne Gates	Niagara Falls	2014	
France Gélinas	Nickel Belt	2007	
Jennifer French	Oshawa	2014	
Catherine McKenney	Ottawa Centre	2025	
Chandra Pasma	Ottawa West—Nepean	2022	
Alexa Gilmour	Parkdale—High Park	2025	
Fatima Shaban	Scarborough Southwest	2026	
Jennie Stevens	St. Catharines	2018	Shadow Solicitor General, 2025 –present
Chris Glover	Spadina—Fort York	2018	
Jamie West	Sudbury	2018	Shadow Minister for Labour, Energy, and Mines
Lise Vaugeois	Thunder Bay—Superior North	2022	
John Vanthof	Timiskaming—Cochrane	2011	House Leader, 2022 – present
Kristyn Wong-Tam	Toronto Centre	2022	Shadow Attorney General, 2022 –present
Peter Tabuns	Toronto—Danforth	2006	Shadow Minister for Environment, Conservation and Parks
Jessica Bell	University—Rosedale	2018	
Catherine Fife	Waterloo	2012	
Lisa Gretzky	Windsor West	2014	

== Structure ==
The officers of the Ontario NDP are the leader, the party president, six vice-presidents and the treasurer. Apart from the leader, the party officers are elected at the party's biennial convention. The leader is head of the parliamentary party and leads the party caucus in the Ontario legislature and is the party's presumed candidate to lead an NDP government should the party be called upon to form a government. The Provincial Director (formerly Provincial Secretary) is an employee of the party and manages the day to day party organization outside of the legislature. The Provincial Director is hired by the party executive with the ratification of the provincial council.

The party's provincial executive is composed of the party's officers, six men and six women elected on a regional basis, three women and three men elected at large, one woman and one man elected by the Ontario New Democratic Youth, two women representing the Women & Gender Diverse Committee (formerly the Women's Committee), one woman and one man representing the Lesbian, Gay and Trans-identified Committee, one woman and one man representing the party's ethnic committees, one woman and one man representing the Disability Rights Committee and one woman and one man representing the Aboriginal Section.

The highest decision-making body of the party is the provincial convention held once every two years. The convention is made up of delegates elected by riding associations, sections of the party (ONDY, Women & Gender Diverse, LGBT, Ethnic, Aboriginal, Disability), affiliates such as labour unions and other bodies.

The Provincial Council is the next highest decision making level and meets between conventions, usually three or four times a year. the Provincial Council is made up of the provincial executive, two representatives of the party's provincial caucus, delegates elected from each riding association, representatives of regional party bodies, representatives of sections of the party and party affiliates.

== See also ==
- List of political parties in Ontario
- List of articles about Ontario CCF/NDP members
- Ontario CCF/NDP leadership elections
- Ontario New Democratic Party candidates in the 1990 Ontario provincial election
- Ontario New Democratic Party Shadow Cabinet of the 41st Legislative Assembly of Ontario
- Ontario New Democratic Party Shadow Cabinet of the 40th Legislative Assembly of Ontario
- Metro New Democratic Party – Municipal NDP in Toronto in the 1970s and 1980s
