= Ben Chin =

Canadian politician

- Hangul: 진병규
- RR: Jin Byeonggyu
- MR: Chin Pyŏnggyu

Benjamin Byung Kyu Chin (born 1964), known for short as Ben Chin, is a Canadian political advisor and former public and private sector executive. He had an earlier career as a television journalist.

== Personal life and education ==
Chin was born in Geneva, Switzerland. He first came to Canada as a child from 1970 to 1974, when his father served as the South Korean Ambassador to Canada in Ottawa. After his father fell out of political favour with the South Korean government, Chin was sent to Toronto on his own to continue his education and attend junior high school. After completing high school at East York Collegiate Institute (with a brief stint living in the Washington, D.C., area with his parents), Chin went to the University of Toronto. He lived with his older brother and sister, who were both students at the University of Toronto.

His brother, Jik Chin, is currently a chemistry professor at the University of Toronto.

== Career ==
Chin turned to journalism, working at Citytv as a general assignment reporter and anchor from 1989 to 1997. He was best known for covering the Paul Bernardo murder trial. He then left Citytv and headed east to Halifax as Atlantic Bureau Chief for CTV News. In 1998 he returned to Toronto and joined CBC Newsworld, where he anchored The National on weekends.

In 2003, he joined then-new Toronto-based television station CKXT-TV and co-hosted the nightly evening newscast, Toronto Tonight with Sarika Sehgal.

In 2005, Chin joined the communications staff of Ontario Premier Dalton McGuinty.

On February 16, 2006, Chin was the Liberal Party nominee for the provincial by-election in Toronto—Danforth, held to fill the vacancy created when NDP incumbent Marilyn Churley resigned to run in the 2006 federal election. Chin was defeated by his NDP opponent, Peter Tabuns, the former executive director of Greenpeace Canada and a former Toronto City Councillor for part of the riding.

He did not run in the 2007 provincial elections, returning as a senior advisor in the Premier's Office, and subsequently worked on the central campaign team. Also, during the election, Chin did a series of YouTube videos under the banner Liberal TV for the Ontario Liberals.

After working in the private sector, Chin joined the Ontario Power Authority as Vice President of Communications and then joined AIR MILES for Social Change as vice president, Conservation.

Chin was appointed communications director to British Columbia Premier Christy Clark in 2012, subsequently becoming executive director, Communications and Issues Management in the office of the Premier of BC. He held this position until the defeat of Clark's Liberal government and the swearing in of her successor, John Horgan of the British Columbia New Democratic Party.

He joined federal Finance Minister Bill Morneau's ministerial office as senior advisor in October 2017, rising to chief of staff in May 2018.

On February 27, 2019, Chin became a figure of criticism after former Attorney General Jody Wilson-Raybould accused him, among others, of applying inappropriate pressure to a decision regarding a deferred prosecution agreement for Quebec contractor SNC-Lavalin.

On May 14, 2019, Chin was appointed as Senior Advisor to Prime Minister Justin Trudeau.
