= France Gélinas =

Canadian politician

France Gélinas MPP
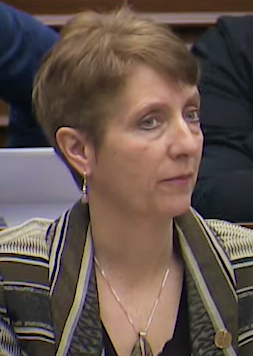
- Gélinas in 2020

Member of the Ontario Provincial Parliament for Nickel Belt
- Incumbent
- Assumed office October 10, 2007
- Preceded by: Shelley Martel

Personal details
- Born: 1953 (age 72–73)
- Party: New Democratic
- Profession: Physiotherapist, health care administrator

France Gélinas (born 1953) is a politician in Ontario, Canada. She is a New Democratic member of the Legislative Assembly of Ontario who was elected in 2007. She represents the riding of Nickel Belt.

== Background ==
Gélinas was born and raised in Shawinigan, Quebec. She is trained as a physiotherapist and has been the executive director of the Community Health Centre of Sudbury, on the United Way's Citizens' Advisory Panel, served as president of the Francophone Reference Group of the Northern Ontario School of Medicine. She lives in the Naughton neighbourhood of Sudbury with her family.

== Politics ==
She ran in the 2007 provincial election as the New Democratic candidate in the riding of Nickel Belt. She defeated Liberal candidate Ron Dupuis by 2,762 votes. She was re-elected in the 2011 and 2014 elections, as well as the 2018 and 2022 provincial elections.

In May 2008, she joined caucus colleagues Michael Prue and Peter Tabuns in calling on the provincial government to crack down on private hydroelectricity marketers.

She has been an outspoken critic of competitive bidding in the province's home care services, and of layoffs affecting nurses in provincial hospitals.

Following the announcement of Howard Hampton's retirement as leader of the Ontario New Democratic Party, there was some speculation in Sudbury's local media that Gélinas might join the leadership campaign. However, she indicated on June 16, 2008 that as a relatively new MPP, she did not feel that she was ready to become a leadership candidate. She later endorsed Gilles Bisson for the leadership, and supported the eventual winner, Andrea Horwath, on the final ballot at the convention.

In 2009, Gélinas introduced the Healthy Decisions for Healthy Eating bill, a private member's bill which would mandate the provision of nutritional and calorie information on restaurant menus. In 2011, she introduced a private member's bill to have the provincial Commissioner of French Language Services report to the full Legislative Assembly of Ontario, rather than exclusively to the Minister of Francophone Affairs.

In 2014 she was re-elected with 62.66% of the vote, the highest percent of any MPP in Ontario that year.

In 2015, Gélinas introduced a private member's bill to mandate the creation of a fully independent French-language university in Ontario.

She is currently the party's critic for Health and Long-Term Care, and francophone affairs in the NDP's shadow cabinet.

She was re-elected at the 2022 Ontario general election.

As of August 11, 2024, she serves as the Official Opposition's critic for Health.

== Electoral record ==
2025 Ontario general election: Nickel Belt
Party	Candidate	Votes	%	±%	Expenditures
New Democratic	France Gélinas	17,123	48.37	–2.41	$54,498
Progressive Conservative	Randy Hazlett	12,629	35.67	+5.81	$25,448
Liberal	Natalie Labbée	3,874	10.94	+1.05	$8,538
New Blue	Paul Divincenzo	676	1.91	–3.04	$0
Green	Connie Hill	631	1.78	–1.21	
Libertarian	James Chretien	470	1.33	–	$0
Total valid votes		35,403	99.17	–	$125,506
Total rejected, unmarked and declined ballots		298	0.83	+0.39	
Turnout		35,701	50.51	+4.99	
Eligible voters		70,685			
New Democratic hold		Swing		–4.11	
Source: Elections Ontario

2022 Ontario general election: Nickel Belt
Party	Candidate	Votes	%	±%	Expenditures
New Democratic	France Gélinas	15,611	50.77	–12.73	$55,649
Progressive Conservative	Randy Hazlett	9,181	29.86	+7.87	$23,127
Liberal	Gilles Proulx	3,042	9.89	+1.17	$8,861
New Blue	Melanie Savoie	1,522	4.95	–	$4,981
Green	Glenys Babcock	921	3.00	–0.12	$0
Ontario Party	Willy Schneider	470	1.53	–	$1,507
Total valid votes/expense limit		30,747	99.56	–	$106,532
Total rejected, unmarked and declined ballots		137	0.44	–0.57	
Turnout		30,884	45.51	–9.91	
Eligible voters		67,858			
New Democratic hold		Swing		–10.30	
Source: Elections Ontario

2018 Ontario general election: Nickel Belt
Party	Candidate	Votes	%	±%	Expenditures
New Democratic	France Gélinas	23,157	63.50	+0.88	$40,029
Progressive Conservative	Jo-Ann Cardinal	8,018	21.99	+10.07	$28,428
Liberal	Tay Butt	3,182	8.73	–13.17	$8,353
Green	Bill Crumplin	1,137	3.12	–0.45	$1,915
Northern Ontario Heritage	Matthew del Papa	373	1.02	–	none listed
Libertarian	James Chretien	220	0.60	–	none listed
Consensus Ontario	Kevin R. Brault	214	0.59	–	none listed
None of the Above	Bailey Burch-Belanger	166	0.46	–	$0
Total valid votes/expense limit		36,467	98.98		
Total rejected, unmarked and declined ballots		375	1.02	–0.05	
Turnout		36,842	55.42	+5.42	
Eligible voters		66,479			
New Democratic notional hold		Swing		–4.59	
Source: Elections Ontario

2014 Ontario general election: Nickel Belt
Party	Candidate	Votes	%	±%
New Democratic	France Gélinas	19,941	62.66	+7.77
Liberal	James Tregonning	6,977	21.92	-2.33
Progressive Conservative	Marck Blay	3,782	11.88	-6.47
Green	Heather K. Dahlstrom	1,123	3.53	+1.03
Total valid votes		31,823	100.00	
New Democratic hold		Swing		+5.05
Source: Elections Ontario

2011 Ontario general election
Party	Candidate	Votes	%	±%
New Democratic	France Gélinas	16,826	54.89	+8.26
Liberal	Tony Ryma	7,434	24.25	-13.79
Progressive Conservative	Paula Peroni	5,625	18.35	+8.29
Green	Stephanie-Lynn Russell	770	2.5	-1.72
Total valid votes		30,655	100.00	

2007 Ontario general election
Party	Candidate	Votes	%	±%
New Democratic	France Gélinas	15,126	46.6	0.08
Liberal	Ron Dupuis	12,341	38.0	-0.64
Progressive Conservative	Renée Germain	3,264	10.1	-3.39
Green	Fred Twilley	1,368	4.2	2.85
Family Coalition	Richard St-Denis	341	1.1	
