= Ontario New Democratic Youth =

Youth wing of the Ontario New Democratic Party

Ontario New Democratic Youth Jeunes Néo-Démocrates de l'Ontario
- Co-Chairperson: Raymond Bushan; Emma Hartviksen
- Ideology: Democratic socialism
- Mother party: New Democratic Party; Ontario New Democratic Party
- Newspaper: The Public Alternative
- Website: Website

The Ontario New Democratic Youth (ONDY) (French: Jeunes néo-démocrates de l'Ontario (JNDO)) is the youth wing of the Ontario New Democratic Party which is in turn affiliated with the federal New Democratic Party. Any party member, aged 25 or under is automatically a member of ONDY and is eligible to attend and vote in the youth wing's yearly convention, known as ONDYCON.

== Structure ==
ONDY members are grouped into clubs designated to represent one of 4 things: a riding, a school campus, a labour group, or a region. These clubs organize various events and act as the local chapters of ONDY. At the provincial level, ONDY is run by its executive, which are elected to one year terms by the Ontario New Democratic Youth's entire membership at its yearly convention. The executive must adhere to the rules of gender parity and is headed by two Co-Chairs.

== Influence ==
The two co-chairs of ONDY are given a place on the Ontario New Democratic Party executive. In addition, ten members of the Ontario New Democratic Youth are chosen at the annual convention to attend provincial council on behalf of ONDY. Local youth clubs are also able to send two members to meetings of the Ontario New Democratic Party's provincial council.

ONDY Alumni include Natasha Fatah, who was co-chair from 1999 to 2000.
