= Peter Tabuns =

Canadian politician (born 1951)

Peter Tabuns MPP
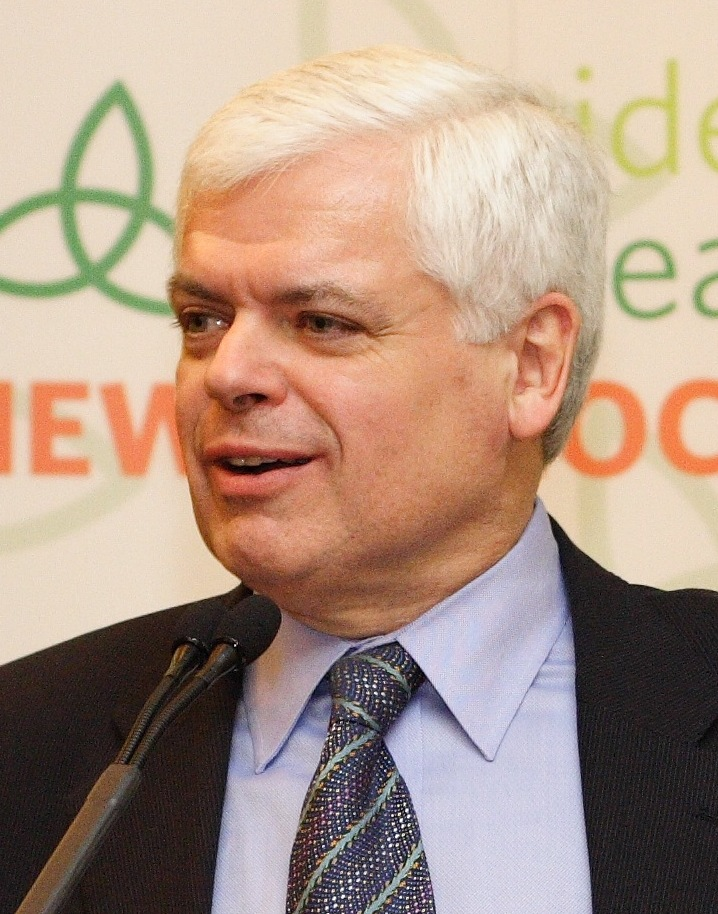
- Tabuns in 2009

Leader of the Official Opposition of Ontario
- In office June 28, 2022 – February 4, 2023
- Preceded by: Andrea Horwath
- Succeeded by: Marit Stiles

Interim Leader of the Ontario New Democratic Party
- In office June 28, 2022 – February 4, 2023
- Deputy: Sol Mamakwa; Doly Begum
- Preceded by: Andrea Horwath
- Succeeded by: Marit Stiles

Member of the Ontario Provincial Parliament for Toronto—Danforth
- Incumbent
- Assumed office March 30, 2006
- Preceded by: Marilyn Churley

Personal details
- Born: Peter Charles Tabuns; October 3, 1951 (age 75) London, Ontario, Canada
- Party: New Democratic
- Spouse: Shawn Kerwin
- Children: 1

Peter Charles Tabuns MPP (born October 3, 1951) is a Canadian politician who served as the interim leader of the Ontario New Democratic Party and the leader of the Official Opposition from 2022 to 2023. He is a member of the Legislative Assembly of Ontario, first elected in a 2006 by-election to represent the riding of Toronto—Danforth.

In 2009, he entered the party leadership convention but lost to Andrea Horwath. Following Horwath's resignation as leader after the 2022 Ontario general election, the Ontario New Democratic Party caucus unanimously recommended Tabuns's selection as the Ontario NDP's interim leader. His appointment was confirmed by the party's provincial council on June 28, 2022. He served until the election of his successor, Marit Stiles, following the leadership election.

Following the 2025 Ontario general election (February 27, 2025), Peter Tabuns was appointed the Official Opposition Critic for Emergency Preparedness and Response, and for Environment, Conservation, and Parks.

== Background ==
Tabuns was born in London, Ontario, to Anton Tabuns (Latvian: Antons Tabūns), an auto mechanic, and his wife Sarah, who was born and raised in Liverpool, England. Anton was born and raised in Latvia, though he managed to leave his homeland after the Soviet occupation and immigrate to England. While working on a farm, fixing equipment, he met Sarah, and soon after marrying, the couple immigrated to Canada. Soon after, the family found residence with another recent immigrant. In addition to Peter, Anton and Sarah have two other children, Frank and Anna.

Tabuns attended York University, where he studied political science and was actively involved in York's student council. Tabuns was also president of Citizens for a Safe Environment, a Riverdale environmental group that lobbied the city to end garbage incineration at the Commissioners Street plant in the Port Lands. He became managing director of a housing co-op on Oak Street, and was also vice-chair of the Co-operative Housing Federation of Toronto.

He lives with Shawn Kerwin, who is a theatre designer and professor at York University. They have a son, Anton, from Tabuns's previous relationship.

== Municipal politics ==
Tabuns was city councillor for Ward 8 – Riverdale – of the former City of Toronto from 1990 to 1997, representing part of the Toronto-Danforth riding he now represents provincially. He was a member of the Board of Health for seven years, and was chair from 1993 to 1997. In 1995 he moved to ban smoking in shopping mall food courts. A year later the city extended the ban to include bars and restaurants.

In 1996, he supported a boycott of Harvey's restaurants because its parent company Cara Operations had donated money to the Progressive Conservative Party for the previous three years. The Board of Health initially passed the motion 7-6 but later rescinded it following a storm of protest. Tabuns was unrepentant and said that corporations must be held accountable for supporting Ontario Premier Mike Harris. Tabuns said, "What Mike Harris has done is put greased skids under the economy of this city and pushed it downhill."

In 1997 the amalgamation of Metropolitan Toronto reduced the number of councillor positions. Tabuns was forced to compete with fellow NDP councillors Pam McConnell (who had previously represented Ward 7, adjacent to Tabuns's Ward 8) and Jack Layton (who had held a seat on Metro Council representing the same area as Wards 7 and 8) for one of two council positions returned by the east-end ward. A phantom candidate named "Larry Tabin" also entered the election. It has been alleged that Tabin was enlisted as a candidate by bar and restaurant owners seeking to defeat Tabuns over his anti-smoking initiative; despite his presence on the ballot, Tabin did not actually conduct any visible campaign. In the confusion, Tabin was able to draw enough votes away from Peter Tabuns to cost Tabuns the election. Tabuns came in third, with about 200 fewer votes than McConnell.

== Greenpeace ==
From 1999 to 2004, Tabuns was executive director of Greenpeace Canada. Under Tabuns's leadership, the organization advocated for environmental protection, including the adoption of the Kyoto Protocol. Tabuns also served as special advisor on climate change to Jack Layton from 2004 to 2005.

Tabuns was criticized by some members of Office and Professional Employees International Union (OPEIU) local 343 (now Canadian Office and Professional Employees Union 343) in 2002, when Greenpeace terminated its door-to-door fundraising efforts and transferred foot canvassers to telephone fundraising. No layoffs occurred; however, several workers disputed Greenpeace's assertions that the new positions were of "comparable salary and benefits", and held an information picket outside Greenpeace offices. According to the union, the "circumstances surrounding the closure of the door canvass were amicably resolved".

== Federal politics ==
Tabuns ran as the NDP candidate in the riding of Beaches—East York during the 2004 federal election. He lost the election to Liberal incumbent Maria Minna by 7,738 votes.

== Provincial politics ==
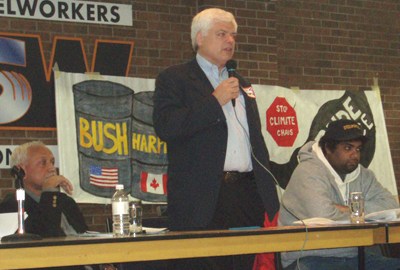
Peter Tabuns speaking at an environmental teach-in for Toronto Climate Campaign on Nov. 17, 2007

On February 15, 2006, the Toronto—Danforth NDP riding association nominated Tabuns as the party's candidate in the provincial by-election, to fill the vacancy caused by the resignation of former NDP Member of Provincial Parliament Marilyn Churley. Churley resigned her provincial seat in order to run in the 2006 federal election as the NDP candidate for Beaches-East York.

Tabuns's opponents in the election were former broadcaster and Liberal candidate Ben Chin, Progressive Conservative candidate Georgina Blanas and Green Party candidate Paul Charbonneau. On March 30, 2006, Tabuns won the by-election with 47.8% support from voters.

Upon being sworn in as an MPP, NDP Leader Howard Hampton reorganized his shadow cabinet and gave the rookie member a long list of portfolios, including Transportation, Environment, Public Infrastructure Renewal, Greater Toronto Area, Culture, Tourism and Recreation, Citizenship and Immigration, and Multicultural Affairs.

In October 2006, Tabuns was voted Best MPP by Now Magazine readers, for his positions on climate change, the Portlands Energy Centre, and early childhood learning centres in his constituency. Tabuns has also been known for his stance on same-sex parental rights, anti-toxics legislation and recognition of foreign credentials. In the same month, Tabuns was recognized for tabling a motion to recognize June 22, 2006 as Chinese Canadian Head Tax Redress Day.

Tabuns was re-elected in the 2007, 2011, 2014, 2018, 2022, and 2025 provincial elections.

He served as the party's interim leader, after previously serving as the party's critic on energy and climate change and before that critic for Education and Energy issues. After the election of Marit Stiles, he returned to his role as critic on energy and climate change.

=== 2009 leadership bid ===
Following the resignation of party leader Howard Hampton in June 2008, Peter Tabuns was mentioned in the press as a likely candidate in the emerging campaign for the leadership. On October 27, 2008, Tabuns officially launched his campaign for the leadership. The party's leadership convention was held in March 2009. Tabuns lost to Andrea Horwath by a margin of 60% to 40% on the third ballot following the defeat of contenders Michael Prue and Gilles Bisson in earlier rounds.

=== Interim Leader ===
On June 13, 2022, the 31 members of the Ontario NDP caucus elected in the 2022 Ontario general election met and unanimously endorsed Peter Tabuns to serve as interim party leader pending the outcome of its forthcoming leadership election. Following this recommendation by caucus, his appointment was confirmed by the party's provincial council on June 28, 2022. Marit Stiles became the leader following a leadership election that was held on February 4, 2023.

In 2026, Tabuns endorsed Avi Lewis in that year's federal NDP leadership race.

== Electoral record ==
=== Federal elections ===
2004 Canadian federal election: Beaches—East York
Party	Candidate	Votes	%	±%
Liberal	Maria Minna	22,494	47.93	−5.29
New Democratic	Peter Tabuns	15,156	32.29	+11.77
Conservative	Nick Nikopoulos	6,603	14.07	−8.53
Green	Peter Davison	2,127	4.53	
Marijuana	Daniel Dufresne	365	0.78	
Independent	Edward Slota	80	0.17	
Communist	Miguel Figueroa	62	0.13	
Marxist–Leninist	Roger Carter	46	0.10	
Total valid votes		46,933	99.57	
Total rejected ballots		204	0.43	
Turnout		47,137	64.02	
Eligible voters		73,623		
Liberal hold		Swing		-8.53
Change is computed from the 2000 redistributed results. Conservative vote is compared to the total of the Canadian Alliance vote and Progressive Conservative vote in 2000 election.

=== Provincial elections ===
2025 Ontario general election: Toronto—Danforth
Party	Candidate	Votes	%	±%	Expenditures
New Democratic	Peter Tabuns	25,607	60.42	+5.03	$108,884
Liberal	Connor Taras	8,997	21.21	–1.15	$58,293
Progressive Conservative	Adam Ratkowski	6,172	14.55	+1.11	$3,216
Green	Orlando Wright	1,199	2.82	–3.26	$2,982
New Blue	Stephen Graham	424	1.00	–0.25	$0
Total valid votes/expense limit		42,413	99.28	–0.13	$138,178
Total rejected, unmarked, and declined ballots		306	0.72	+0.13	
Turnout		42,719	50.10	+0.66	
Eligible voters		85,269			
New Democratic hold		Swing		▲3.09	
Source: Elections Ontario

2022 Ontario general election: Toronto—Danforth
Party	Candidate	Votes	%	±%	Expenditures
New Democratic	Peter Tabuns	22,890	55.39	−8.85	$112,989
Liberal	Mary Fragedakis	9,240	22.36	+8.29	$77,403
Progressive Conservative	Colleen McCleery	5,556	13.44	−2.41	$18,446
Green	Marcelo Levy	2,513	6.08	+1.70	$4,531
New Blue	Milton Kandias	515	1.25		$9,594
Ontario Party	George Simopoulos	232	0.56		$0
None of the Above	Christopher Brophy	201	0.49		$0
Communist	Jennifer Moxon	177	0.43	+0.10	$0
Total valid votes/expense limit		41,324	99.41	+0.38	$117,719
Total rejected, unmarked, and declined ballots		244	0.59	−0.38	
Turnout		41,568	49.44	−12.14	
Eligible voters		83,888			
New Democratic hold		Swing		−8.57	
Source(s): "Summary of Valid Votes Cast for Each Candidate" (PDF). Elections Ontario. 2022. Archived from the original on May 18, 2023.; "Statistical Summary by Electoral District" (PDF). Elections Ontario. 2022. Archived from the original on May 21, 2023.

2018 Ontario general election
Party	Candidate	Votes	%	±%
New Democratic	Peter Tabuns	32,938	64.25	+19.64
Progressive Conservative	Patricia Kalligosfyris	8,131	15.86	+5.85
Liberal	Li Koo	7,216	14.07	-23.15
Green	Andrew Trotter	2,248	4.38	-1.09
Libertarian	Paul Layton	341	0.67	-0.49
Communist	Ivan Byard	167	0.33	-0.07
Independent	John Kladitis	118	0.23	
Independent	John Richardson	110	0.21	
Total valid votes		51,269	99.03	+0.30
Total rejected, unmarked and declined ballots		503	0.97	-0.30
Turnout		51,772	61.58	+6.28
Eligible voters		84,072		
New Democratic hold		Swing		
Source: Elections Ontario

2014 Ontario general election
Party	Candidate	Votes	%	±%
New Democratic	Peter Tabuns	19,190	44.61	-9.40
Liberal	Rob Newman	15,983	37.16	+6.56
Progressive Conservative	Naomi Solomon	4,304	10.01	+0.62
Green	Rachel Power	2,351	5.47	+1.83
Libertarian	Thomas Armstrong	501	1.16	-0.02
Communist	Elizabeth Rowley	172	0.40	
Canadians' Choice	John Richardson	167	0.40	+0.19
Vegan Environmental	Simon Luisi	149	0.35	
Freedom	Tristan Parlette	121	0.28	-0.01
People's Political Party	Ali Azaroghli	79	0.18	-0.20
Total valid votes		43,017	98.73	-0.67
Total rejected, unmarked and declined ballots		553	1.27	+0.67
Total turnout		43,570	55.30	+6.00
Total electors		78,787		
New Democratic hold		Swing		-7.92
Source: Elections Ontario

2011 Ontario general election
Party	Candidate	Votes	%	±%
New Democratic	Peter Tabuns	20,062	54.01	+8.16
Liberal	Marisa Sterling	11,369	30.60	+1.40
Progressive Conservative	Rita Jethi	3,488	9.39	-1.89
Green	Tim Whalley	1,354	3.64	-7.51
Libertarian	John Recker	440	1.18	+0.01
People's Political Party	Kevin Clarke	143	0.38	
Independent	Neil Mercer	110	0.30	
Freedom	Stéphane Vera	107	0.29	
Independent	John Richardson	75	0.20	
Total valid votes		37,148	99.40	+0.41
Total rejected, unmarked and declined ballots		226	0.60	-0.41
Turnout		37,374	49.30	-3.88
Eligible voters		75,815		
New Democratic hold		Swing		+3.38
Source: Elections Ontario

2007 Ontario general election
Party	Candidate	Votes	%	±%
New Democratic	Peter Tabuns	17,975	45.85	-1.95
Liberal	Joyce Rowlands	11,448	29.20	-9.72
Progressive Conservative	Robert Bisbicis	4,423	11.28	+1.35
Green	Patrick Kraemer	4,372	11.15	+9.02
Libertarian	Mark Scott	460	1.17	
Family Coalition	Michael Kidd	273	0.70	+0.22
Communist	Shona Bracken	253	0.65	
Total valid votes		39,204	98.99	-0.59
Total rejected, unmarked and declined ballots		401	1.01	+0.59
Turnout		39,605	53.18	+13.29
Eligible voters		74,479		
New Democratic hold		Swing		
Source: Elections Ontario

Ontario provincial by-election, March 26, 2006
Party	Candidate	Votes	%	±%
New Democratic	Peter Tabuns	13,054	48.26	+0.66
Liberal	Ben Chin	10,636	38.93	+7.29
Progressive Conservative	Georgina Blanas	2,740	10.03	-6.99
Green	Paul Charbonneau	582	2.13	-1.4
Family Coalition	Wictor Borkowski	104	0.38	-0.08
Freedom	Franz Cauchi	93	0.34	
Independent	Carol Wielhorski	63	0.23	
Independent	Mehmet Ali Yagiz	50	0.18	-0.01
Total valid votes		27,322	99.58	+0.34
Total rejected, unmarked and declined ballots		115	0.42	-0.34
Turnout		27,437	39.89	-15.97
Eligible voters		68,782		
New Democratic hold		Swing		
Source: Elections Ontario

=== Municipal elections ===
1997 Toronto Municipal Election: Ward 25 – Don River

Council Candidate	Vote	%
Jack Layton	15,045	29.97
Pam McConnell	8,359	16.65
Peter Tabuns	8,141	16.21
Soo Wong	7,212	14.36
Spiros Papathanasakis	6,590	13.13
Terry Brackett	1,546	3.08
Mike Armstrong	1,429	2.85
Wendy Forrest	947	1.89
Larry Tabin	939	1.87

1994 Toronto Municipal Election: Ward 8 – Riverdale

Council Candidate	Vote	%
Peter Tabuns	6,134	46.61
Arthur Potts	4,319	32.82
Dan Salapoutis	1,991	15.13
Michael Green	716	5.44

1991 Toronto Municipal Election: Ward 8 – Riverdale

Council Candidate	Vote	%
Peter Tabuns	5,974	46.63
John Roy	5,709	44.56
Michael Green	1,129	8.81
