= Toronto—Danforth (provincial electoral district) =

Provincial electoral district in Ontario, Canada

Coordinates: 43.680°N 79.349°W

Ontario electoral district
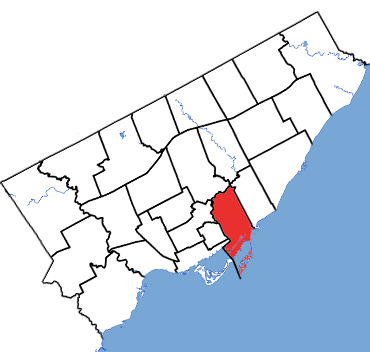
- Toronto—Danforth in relation to the other Toronto ridings

Provincial electoral district
- Legislature: Legislative Assembly of Ontario
MPP
Peter Tabuns
New Democratic
- District created: 1999
- First contested: 1999
- Last contested: 2025

Demographics
- Population (2016): 106,880
- Electors (2018): 84,072
- Area (km²): 29
- Pop. density (per km²): 3,685.5
- Census division: Toronto
- Census subdivision: Toronto

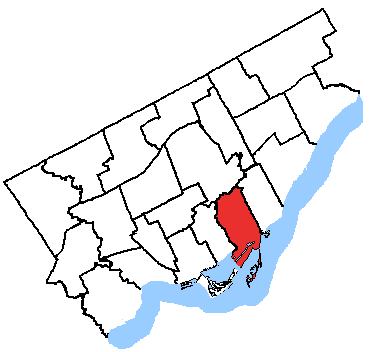
Toronto-Danforth from 2003 to 2018

Toronto—Danforth (formerly Broadview—Greenwood) is a provincial electoral district in Ontario, Canada, that has been represented in the Legislative Assembly of Ontario since 1999. It lies to the east of Downtown Toronto.

The riding is represented in the Legislative Assembly of Ontario by Peter Tabuns of the Ontario New Democratic Party (NDP).

Toronto—Danforth includes an array of ethnicities, including large Greek, Chinese, Muslim, and East-Indian communities.

The northern portion of the riding, East York, tends to lean right-of-centre, while the southern half, including Riverdale, Leslieville and Riverside, usually swings to the left.

The name of the electoral district was changed in 2000 from "Broadview—Greenwood" to "Toronto—Danforth" on the suggestion of Dennis Mills, the riding's federal Member of Parliament. In 2003, it was given its current boundaries, which consist of the part of the city of Toronto bounded on the south by Lake Ontario and Toronto Harbour, on the east by Coxwell Avenue and Coxwell Boulevard, on the north by Taylor Creek and the Don River East Branch, and on the west by the Don River.

== History ==
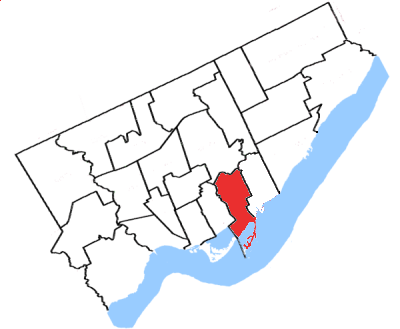
The riding from 1996 to 2003

The provincial electoral district was created in 1999 when provincial ridings were defined to have the same borders as federal ridings. It includes all of the former provincial electoral district of Riverdale, approximately 41% of the former riding of York East and 5% of the former riding of Beaches—Woodbine.

== Members of Provincial Parliament ==
Assembly	Years	Member	Party
Broadview—Greenwood
Riding created from Riverdale, York East and Beaches—Woodbine
37th	1999–2003	Marilyn Churley	New Democratic
Riding renamed — Toronto—Danforth
38th	2003–2005	Marilyn Churley	New Democratic
38th	2006–2007	Peter Tabuns	New Democratic
39th	2007–2011	Peter Tabuns	New Democratic
40th	2011–2014	Peter Tabuns	New Democratic
41st	2014–2018	Peter Tabuns	New Democratic
42nd	2018–2022	Peter Tabuns	New Democratic
43rd	2022–2025	Peter Tabuns	New Democratic
44th	2025–present	Peter Tabuns	New Democratic
Sourced from the Ontario Legislative Assembly

== Election results ==
=== Toronto—Danforth ===
Winning party in each polling division of Toronto—Danforth at the 2025 Ontario general election

2025 Ontario general election
Party	Candidate	Votes	%	±%	Expenditures
New Democratic	Peter Tabuns	25,607	60.42	+5.03	$108,884
Liberal	Connor Taras	8,997	21.21	–1.15	$58,293
Progressive Conservative	Adam Ratkowski	6,172	14.55	+1.11	$3,216
Green	Orlando Wright	1,199	2.82	–3.26	$2,982
New Blue	Stephen Graham	424	1.00	–0.25	$0
Total valid votes/expense limit		42,413	99.28	–0.13	$138,178
Total rejected, unmarked, and declined ballots		306	0.72	+0.13	
Turnout		42,719	50.10	+0.66	
Eligible voters		85,269			
New Democratic hold		Swing		▲3.09	
Source: Elections Ontario

Winning party in each polling division of Toronto—Danforth at the 2022 Ontario general election

2022 Ontario general election
Party	Candidate	Votes	%	±%	Expenditures
New Democratic	Peter Tabuns	22,890	55.39	−8.85	$112,989
Liberal	Mary Fragedakis	9,240	22.36	+8.29	$77,403
Progressive Conservative	Colleen McCleery	5,556	13.44	−2.41	$18,446
Green	Marcelo Levy	2,513	6.08	+1.70	$4,531
New Blue	Milton Kandias	515	1.25		$9,594
Ontario Party	George Simopoulos	232	0.56		$0
None of the Above	Christopher Brophy	201	0.49		$0
Communist	Jennifer Moxon	177	0.43	+0.10	$0
Total valid votes/expense limit		41,324	99.41	+0.38	$117,719
Total rejected, unmarked, and declined ballots		244	0.59	−0.38	
Turnout		41,568	49.44	−12.14	
Eligible voters		83,888			
New Democratic hold		Swing		−8.57	
Source(s): "Summary of Valid Votes Cast for Each Candidate" (PDF). Elections Ontario. 2022. Archived from the original on May 18, 2023.; "Statistical Summary by Electoral District" (PDF). Elections Ontario. 2022. Archived from the original on May 21, 2023.

2018 Ontario general election
Party	Candidate	Votes	%	±%
New Democratic	Peter Tabuns	32,938	64.25	+19.64
Progressive Conservative	Patricia Kalligosfyris	8,131	15.86	+5.85
Liberal	Li Koo	7,216	14.07	-23.15
Green	Andrew Trotter	2,248	4.38	-1.09
Libertarian	Paul Layton	341	0.67	-0.49
Communist	Ivan Byard	167	0.33	-0.07
Independent	John Kladitis	118	0.23	
Independent	John Richardson	110	0.21	
Total valid votes		51,269	99.03	+0.30
Total rejected, unmarked and declined ballots		503	0.97	-0.30
Turnout		51,772	61.58	+6.28
Eligible voters		84,072		
New Democratic hold		Swing		
Source: Elections Ontario

2014 Ontario general election
Party	Candidate	Votes	%	±%
New Democratic	Peter Tabuns	19,190	44.61	-9.40
Liberal	Rob Newman	15,983	37.16	+6.56
Progressive Conservative	Naomi Solomon	4,304	10.01	+0.62
Green	Rachel Power	2,351	5.47	+1.83
Libertarian	Thomas Armstrong	501	1.16	-0.02
Communist	Elizabeth Rowley	172	0.40	
Canadians' Choice	John Richardson	167	0.40	+0.19
Vegan Environmental	Simon Luisi	149	0.35	
Freedom	Tristan Parlette	121	0.28	-0.01
People's Political Party	Ali Azaroghli	79	0.18	-0.20
Total valid votes		43,017	98.73	-0.67
Total rejected, unmarked and declined ballots		553	1.27	+0.67
Total turnout		43,570	55.30	+6.00
Total electors		78,787		
New Democratic hold		Swing		-7.92
Source: Elections Ontario

2011 Ontario general election
Party	Candidate	Votes	%	±%
New Democratic	Peter Tabuns	20,062	54.01	+8.16
Liberal	Marisa Sterling	11,369	30.60	+1.40
Progressive Conservative	Rita Jethi	3,488	9.39	-1.89
Green	Tim Whalley	1,354	3.64	-7.51
Libertarian	John Recker	440	1.18	+0.01
People's Political Party	Kevin Clarke	143	0.38	
Independent	Neil Mercer	110	0.30	
Freedom	Stéphane Vera	107	0.29	
Independent	John Richardson	75	0.20	
Total valid votes		37,148	99.40	+0.41
Total rejected, unmarked and declined ballots		226	0.60	-0.41
Turnout		37,374	49.30	
Eligible voters		75,815		
New Democratic hold		Swing		+3.38
Source: Elections Ontario

2007 Ontario general election
Party	Candidate	Votes	%	±%
New Democratic	Peter Tabuns	17,975	45.85	-1.95
Liberal	Joyce Rowlands	11,448	29.20	-9.72
Progressive Conservative	Robert Bisbicis	4,423	11.28	+1.35
Green	Patrick Kraemer	4,372	11.15	+9.02
Libertarian	Mark Scott	460	1.17	
Family Coalition	Michael Kidd	273	0.70	+0.22
Communist	Shona Bracken	253	0.65	
Total valid votes		39,204	98.99	-0.59
Total rejected, unmarked and declined ballots		401	1.01	+0.59
Turnout		39,605	53.18	+13.29
Eligible voters		74,479		
New Democratic hold		Swing		
Source: Elections Ontario

Ontario provincial by-election, March 26, 2006
Party	Candidate	Votes	%	±%
New Democratic	Peter Tabuns	13,054	48.26	+0.66
Liberal	Ben Chin	10,636	38.93	+7.29
Progressive Conservative	Georgina Blanas	2,740	10.03	-6.99
Green	Paul Charbonneau	582	2.13	-1.4
Family Coalition	Wictor Borkowski	104	0.38	-0.08
Freedom	Franz Cauchi	93	0.34	
Independent	Carol Wielhorski	63	0.23	
Independent	Mehmet Ali Yagiz	50	0.18	-0.01
Total valid votes		27,322	99.58	+0.34
Total rejected, unmarked and declined ballots		115	0.42	-0.34
Turnout		27,437	39.89	-15.97
Eligible voters		68,782		
New Democratic hold		Swing		
Source: Elections Ontario

2003 Ontario general election
Party	Candidate	Votes	%	±%
New Democratic	Marilyn Churley	18,253	47.14	+0.22
Liberal	Jim Davidson	12,246	31.63	+6.94
Progressive Conservative	George Sardelis	6,562	16.95	-7.75
Green	Michael Pilling	1,368	3.53	
Family Coalition	Masood Atchekzai	217	0.56	-0.27
Independent	Mehmet Ali Yagiz	73	0.19	
Total valid votes		38,719	99.24	
Total rejected, unmarked and declined ballots		295	0.76	
Turnout		39,014	55.86	
Eligible voters		69,840		
Source: Elections Ontario

=== Broadview—Greenwood ===
1999 Ontario general election: Broadview—Greenwood
Party	Candidate	Votes	%
New Democratic	Marilyn Churley	18,150	46.92
Progressive Conservative	Rita Smith	9,554	24.70
Liberal	Julie Wang Morris	9,553	24.69
Natural Law	Bob Hyman	565	1.46
Independent	Melanie Cishecki	543	1.40
Family Coalition	Tony Ieraci	320	0.83
Total valid votes		38,685	98.79
Total rejected, unmarked and declined ballots		473	1.21
Turnout		39,158	57.75
Eligible voters		67,810	
New Democratic pickup new district.			
Source: Elections Ontario

== 2007 electoral reform referendum ==
2007 Ontario electoral reform referendum
Side	Votes	%
First Past the Post	17,051	44.9
Mixed member proportional	20,882	55.1
Total valid votes	37,931	100.0

- This riding was one of five ridings where a majority of voters supported MMP.

== See also ==
- List of Ontario provincial electoral districts
- Canadian provincial electoral districts
