= Marilyn Churley =

Canadian politician (born 1948)

The Honourable Marilyn Churley ECO
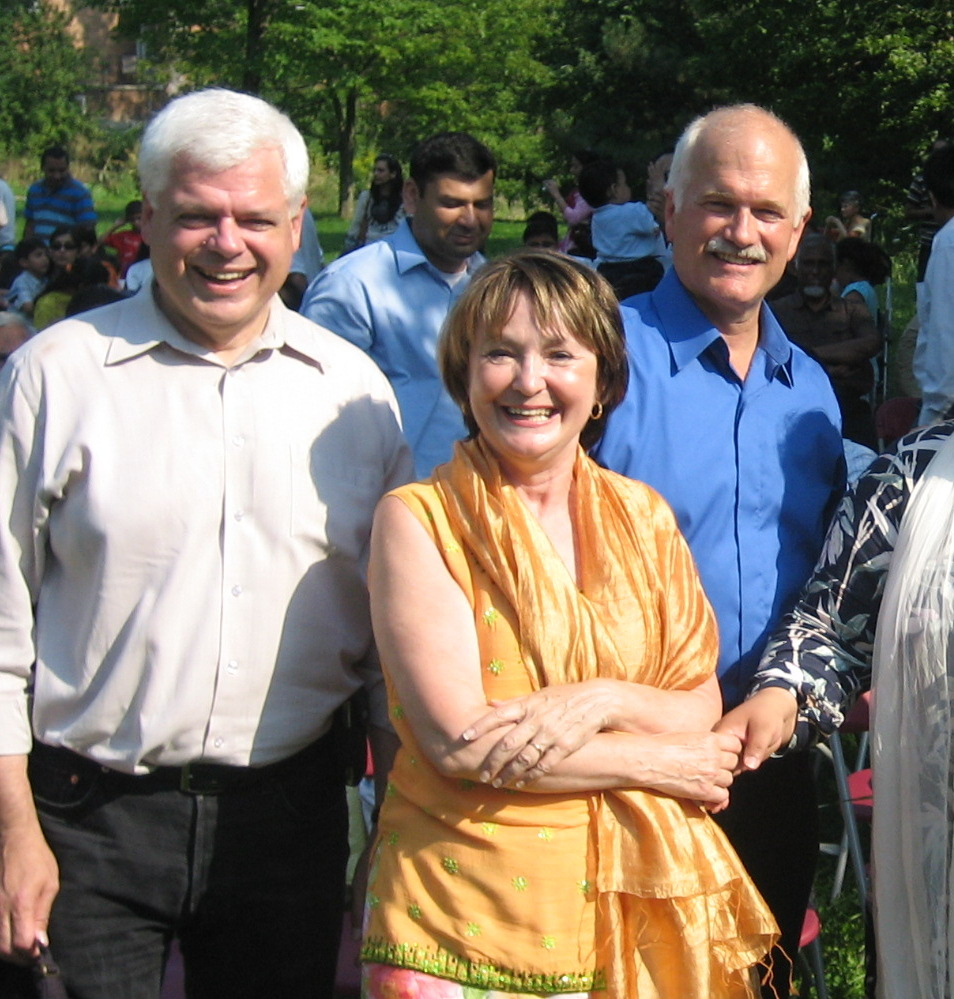
- Marilyn Churley (centre) with Peter Tabuns and Jack Layton at a South Asian Unity Picnic held in Taylor Creek Park, Toronto, Ontario.

Ontario MPP
- In office June 3, 1999 – November 29, 2005
- Preceded by: New riding
- Succeeded by: Peter Tabuns
- Constituency: Toronto—Danforth (2000–2005) (Note: The riding was called Broadview-Greenwood at the time of the election in 1999 but was renamed as Toronto—Danforth in 2000 by federal MP Dennis Mills.); Broadview—Greenwood (1999-2000)
- In office September 6, 1990 – June 2, 1999
- Preceded by: David Reville
- Succeeded by: Riding abolished
- Constituency: Riverdale

City Councillor, Ward 8 (Riverdale)
- In office 1988–1990
- Preceded by: Fred Beavis
- Succeeded by: Peter Tabuns

Personal details
- Born: May 7, 1948 (age 78) Old Perlican, Newfoundland
- Party: New Democratic
- Other party: Ontario New Democratic
- Spouse: Richard Barry
- Occupation: Justice of the Peace

Marilyn Churley (born May 7, 1948) is a former politician in Ontario, Canada. She was a New Democratic member of the Legislative Assembly of Ontario from 1990 to 2005 who represented the downtown Toronto ridings of Riverdale and Toronto—Danforth. She served as a cabinet minister in the Bob Rae government. In opposition she served as her party's critic for the Environment, Women's Issues and Democratic Renewal. She resigned from the legislature to run for the federal New Democratic Party. Churley was her party's candidate for the riding of Beaches—East York in 2006 and 2008, but was defeated both times.

== Background ==
Churley was born in Old Perlican, Newfoundland in 1948. Her parents were Eddie Churley and Myrtis Emberley. Shortly after being born the family moved to Happy Valley, Labrador where her father worked as a cook at Goose Bay Air Force Base. She moved to the Downtown Toronto neighbourhood of Riverdale in 1978. She has served as a director of the Co-op Housing Federation of Toronto, and was a co-founder of the Bain Avenue Day Care Centre. Among other community commitments, Churley was also a director of the Co-operative Housing Federation of Toronto.

In 1968, she gave birth to a son, Billy (Bill Boertjes), whom she placed for adoption. She later reconnected with him in 1997, as described in her 2015 book "Shameless". She also has a daughter, Astra Crosby, born in 1974. Churley's experience with adoption and the search for her son led her to advocate for adoption disclosure reform. Through the 1990s, she introduced several Private Member's Bills to facilitate the process of locating children placed for adoption. None of these passed. Subsequently, she was a strong supporter of a similar bill introduced by Sandra Pupatello. This bill later became the Adoption Information Disclosure Act.

== Politics ==
=== Municipal ===
Churley was elected to the Toronto City Council in 1988. She defeated longtime alderman Fred Beavis in the downtown riding of Riverdale. She was involved in a number of Toronto council initiatives, including the energy efficiency office, the "Clean Up the Don" movement (with fellow city councillors Jack Layton and Barbara Hall) and police patrols on bicycle.

=== In government ===
Churley was elected as a New Democrat in the riding of Riverdale in the provincial election of 1990. The NDP won a majority government in this election and she briefly serving as a Parliamentary Assistant to the Minister of the Environment. On 18 March 1991, Churley was named Minister of Consumer and Commercial Relations after the previous minister, Peter Kormos was fired by Bob Rae for a series of political blunders. Churley remained in this position throughout the Rae government's mandate. In cabinet, Churley opposed attempts to reduce social assistance to single mothers, and only accepted the introduction of casino gambling with reluctance.

Toronto singer/songwriter Kurt Swinghammer wrote a song called "The Signature of Marilyn Churley", inspired by Churley's signature on an elevator license dating from her term in the Rae cabinet.

=== Cabinet positions ===
Rae ministry, Province of Ontario (1990–1995)
Cabinet post (1)
Predecessor	Office	Successor
Peter Kormos	Minister of Consumer and Commercial Relations; 1991–1995	Norm Sterling

=== In opposition ===
Rae's government lost the provincial election of 1995, and Churley was one of seventeen NDP members to retain a seat in the legislature. In opposition, she worked to force the government of Mike Harris to keep the Riverdale Hospital open, stopped the closure of 11 schools, and forced the government to cap tax increases for small business. She also served as Deputy Speaker of the legislature from October 1997 to October 1998.

In the provincial election of 1999, she was re-elected in the redistributed riding of Broadview—Greenwood. Churley became deputy leader of the NDP in 2001, following the retirement of Frances Lankin from the legislature. In the by-election to replace Lankin, the Liberals nominated Greenpeace co-founder and popular television personality Bob Hunter to run for them against former East York mayor Michael Prue for the NDP. During the race, Churley denounced Hunter for having written a novel with first-person accounts of encounters with child prostitutes in Bangkok. The Toronto Sun quoted Ms. Churley as saying: "It says something about Bob Hunter's character he could write such nasty, disgusting stuff about young girls in Thailand." Hunter claimed that the story was written as satire, and sued both Churley and Prue for slander. The suit was withdrawn after the by-election, which Prue won.

Churley was easily re-elected for a fourth term in 2003. After the election, when the NDP lost official party status in the Legislature, Churley threatened to legally change her surname to "Churley-NDP" so that the Speaker would be forced to say NDP when recognizing her in the House. (Note: A non-official party loses the right to have its members addressed in the Legislature as members of the party.) A compromise was later reached which made this change unnecessary, and the party regained official status when Andrea Horwath won a 2004 by-election.

== Federal politics ==
Churley was a prominent supporter of Jack Layton in his bid to become leader of the federal New Democratic Party in 2002. This position put her at odds with party leader Howard Hampton, who supported Bill Blaikie.

In May 2005, Churley announced that once a federal election was called she would resign her Toronto—Danforth seat at the provincial legislature and run for a seat in the House of Commons of Canada. Since Toronto-Danforth is Layton's seat in the federal parliament, Churley sought to represent the neighbouring riding of Beaches—East York. However, Churley could not overcome accusations of being a parachute candidate, despite living only a few miles away from the Beaches—East York riding, and was defeated in the January 23, 2006 election by incumbent Liberal Maria Minna in a hard fought contest.

On February 9, 2007, at a fundraiser in Toronto, Churley clarified that she would be seeking the nomination in Beaches—East York for a potential federal election in 2007. Two months later, Churley was renominated as the NDP candidate in that riding. She was again defeated by Maria Minna in the 2008 election.

== Electoral record ==
2008 Canadian federal election: Beaches—East York
Party	Candidate	Votes	%	±%	Expenditures
Liberal	Maria Minna	18,967	40.97	+0.59	$76,404
New Democratic	Marilyn Churley	14,875	32.13	-2.83	$75,350
Conservative	Caroline Alleslev	7,907	17.08	-0.96	$21,853
Green	Zoran Markovski	4,389	9.48	+3.42	$22,434
Marxist–Leninist	Roger Carter	155	0.33	+0.16	
Total valid votes/expense limit		46,293	100.00	$82,179	
Total rejected ballots		172	0.37	+0.04	
Turnout		46,465	62.93	-7.08	
Liberal hold		Swing	+1.71		

2006 Canadian federal election: Beaches—East York
Party	Candidate	Votes	%	Expenditures
Liberal	Maria Minna	20,678	40.39	$73,454.03
New Democratic	Marilyn Churley	17,900	34.96	$74,996.37
Conservative	Peter Conroy	9,238	18.04	$74,667.09
Green	Jim Harris	3,106	6.07	$9,644.25
Progressive Canadian	Jim Love	183	0.36	$244.26
Marxist–Leninist	Roger Carter	91	0.18	
Total valid votes		51,196	100.00	
Total rejected, unmarked and declined ballots		168		
Turnout		51,364	70.51	
Electors on the lists		72,844		
Sources: Official Results, Elections Canada and Financial Returns, Elections Canada.

== Later life ==
Churley was a regular guest on The Michael Coren Show, a current events television program on CTS. She was appointed a justice of the peace on October 14, 2009.

In 2015, she published her memoirs, entitled Shameless: The Fight for Adoption Disclosure and the Search for My Son which highlights the birth of her son, putting him up for adoption, and her subsequent fight to become reunited with him.

In 2026, Churley endorsed Avi Lewis in that year's federal NDP leadership race.
