= Results of the 1990 Ontario general election by riding =

Candidates of the 1990 Ontario general election
- September 6, 1990

The following are the results by riding (electoral district) of the 1990 Ontario general election, that was held on September 6, 1990.

== Constituency results ==
=== Ottawa-Carleton ===
Electoral district	Candidates				Incumbent
Electoral district	Liberal	PC	NDP	Other	Incumbent
Carleton Total votes: 38,074	Sue LeBrun; 10,143 (26.6%)	Norm Sterling; 17,860 (46.9%)	Alex Munter; 10,071 (26.5%)		Norm Sterling
Carleton East Total votes: 35,376	Gilles Morin; 19,059 (53.9%)	Judy Corbishley; 5,117 (14.5%)	Joan Gullen; 9,976 (28.2%)	W. André Lafrance (FCP) 1,224 (3.5%)	Gilles Morin
Nepean Total votes: 32,328	Hans Daigeler; 13,723 (42.5%)	Doug Collins; 9,870 (30.5%)	John Raudoy; 7,453 (23.1%)	Dan Roy (G); 933 (2.9%); Dan Weiler (Lbt); 349 (1.1%)	Hans Daigeler
Ottawa Centre Total votes: 30,446	Richard Patten; 11,656 (38.3%)	Alex Burney; 2,723 (8.9%)	Evelyn Gigantes; 14,522 (47.7%)	John Gay (FCP); 809 (2.7%); Bill Hipwell (G); 576 (1.9%); John Turmel (Ind); 160 (0.5%)	Richard Patten
Ottawa East; Total votes: 26,218	Bernard Grandmaître; 16,363 (62.4%)	Diana Morin; 2,203 (8.4%)	Lori Lucier; 6,103 (23.3%)	Richard Hudon (FCP); 826 (3.2%); Frank de Jong (G); 723 (2.7%)	Bernard Grandmaître
Ottawa—Rideau Total votes: 29,695	Yvonne O'Neill; 13,454 (45.3%)	Paul Beaudry; 5,234 (17.6%)	Larry Jones; 8,845 (29.8%)	Larry Denys (FCP); 1,049 (3.5%); Jim MacPhee (Ind); 861 (2.9%); Marc Schindler (Lbt); 252 (0.8%)	Yvonne O'Neill
Ottawa South Total votes: 30,185	Dalton McGuinty; 13,845 (45.9%)	Darrel Kent; 7,399 (24.5%)	Margaret Armstrong; 7,826 (25.9%)	Stephen Johns (G); 612 (2.0%); David Fitzpatrick (FCP); 503 (1.7%)	Dalton McGuinty, Sr.
Ottawa West Total votes: 33,422	Bob Chiarelli; 13,908 (41.6%)	Brian Mackey; 9,068 (27.1%)	Allan Edwards; 8,391 (25.1%)	David Boyd (CoR); 1,044 (3.1%); Ian Whyte (G); 1,011 (3.0%)	Bob Chiarelli

=== Eastern Ontario ===
Electoral district	Candidates				Incumbent
Electoral district	Liberal	PC	NDP	Other	Incumbent
Cornwall Total votes: 27 347	John Cleary; 12 725 (46.5%)	Don Kannon; 3169 (11.6%)	Leo Courville; 7044 (26.5%)	Carol-Ann Ross (CoR) 4409 (16.1%)	John Cleary
Frontenac—Addington Total votes: 29,174	Larry South; 8,226 (28.2%)	Jim Bennett; 8,211 (28.1%)	Fred Wilson; 9,696 (33.2%)	Gail Leonard (FCP) 2,020 (6.9%); Ross Baker; 1,021 (3.5%)	Larry South
Hastings—Peterborough Total votes: 28 282	Mike Beeston; 4285 (15.2%)	Jim Pollock; 10 387 (36.7%)	Elmer Buchanan; 11 283 (39.9%)	Anthony Kuttschrutter (FCP) 1199 (4.2%) Ronald Gerow (CoR) 1128 (4.0%)	Jim Pollock
Kingston and the Islands Total votes: 26 807	Ken Keyes; 8092 (30.2%)	John Goodchild; 7079 (26.4%)	Gary Wilson; 10184 (38.0%)	Joan Jackson (FCP) 1452 (5.4%)	Ken Keyes
Lanark—Renfrew; Total votes: 34 060	Guin Persaud; 9665 (28.4%)	Leo Jordan; 11 063 (32.5%)	Harry Martin; 8541 (25.1%)	Murray Reid (CoR) 2938 (8.6%); Frank Foley (FCP) 1853 (5.4%)	Douglas Wiseman
Leeds–Grenville Total votes: 34 330	Chris Puddicombe; 9172 (26.7%)	Bob Runciman; 16 846 (49.1%)	Art Lane; 8312 (24.2%)		Bob Runciman
Prescott and Russell Total votes: 39 833	Jean Poirier; 25 879 (65.0%)	Keith Flavell; 2848 (7.1%)	Carole Roy; 9369 (23.5%)	Paul Lauzon (FCP) 1119 (2.8%); Jean-Serge Brisson (Lbt) 618 (1.6%)	Jean Poirier
Prince Edward—Lennox Total votes: 27 752	Keith MacDonald; 8188 (29.5%)	Don Bonter; 8299 (29.9%)	Paul Johnson; 9204 (33.2%)	Kenn Hineman (CoR) 2061 (7.4%)	Keith MacDonald
Quinte Total votes: 29 691	Hugh O'Neil; 11 114 (37.4%)	Doug Rollins; 5825 (19.6%)	Greg Meehan; 7010 (23.6%)	Stu Meeks (CoR) 3411 (11.5%); Dave Switzer (FCP) 2331 (7.9%)	Hugh O'Neil
Renfrew North Total votes: 30 198	Sean Conway; 13 082 (43.3%)	Diane Yakabuski; 4586 (15.2%)	Ish Theilheimer; 5916 (19.6%)	Frank Adlam (CoR) 5510 (18.2%); Stephen Stanistreet (FCP) 1104 (3.7%)	Sean Conway
Stormont—Dundas—Glengarry and East Grenville Total votes: 29 082	Denis Sabourin; 8386 (28.8%)	Noble Villeneuve; 11 887 (40.9%)	Helena McCuaig; 5357 (18.4%)	Bernie Lauzon (CoR) 3452 (11.9%)	Noble Villeneuve

=== Central Ontario ===
Electoral district	Candidates				Incumbent
Electoral district	Liberal	PC	NDP	Other	Incumbent
Bruce Total votes: 30,429	Murray Elston; 11,476 (37.7%)	Terry Halpin; 7,349 (24.2%)	Len Hope; 7,954 (26.2%)	Linda Freiburger (FCP) 3,639 (12.0%)	Murray Elston
Dufferin—Peel Total votes: 31,447	Mavis Wilson; 10 327 (32.8%)	David Tilson; 10,899 (34.7%)	Sandra Crane; 8,627 (27.4%)	Bob Shapton (Lbt) 1,594 (5.1%)	Mavis Wilson
Bruce—Grey—Owen Sound Total votes: 38,056	Ron Lipsett; 10,257 (27.0%)	Bill Murdoch; 13,742 (36.1%)	Peggy Hutchinson; 11,280 (29.6%)	John Ross (FCP) 2,157 (5.7%); Don Cianci (G) 476 (1.3%); Oleh Stebelsky (Lbt) 144 (0.4%)	Ron Lipsett
Muskoka-Georgian Bay Total votes: 33 031	Ken Black; 9105 (27.6%)	Marilyn Rowe; 10 504 (31.8%)	Dan Waters; 13 422 (40.6%)		Ken Black
Northumberland Total votes: 35 740	Joan Fawcett; 11 984 (33.5%)	Angus Read; 10 890 (30.5%)	Judi Armstrong; 9581 (26.8%)	Doug Young (CoR) 1677 (4.7%); Steve Prust (FCP) 1213 (3.4%); John Meiboom (Lbt) 395 (1.1%)	Joan Fawcett
Peterborough Total votes: 41,888	Peter Adams; 13,628 (32.5%)	Doris Brick; 8,884 (21.2%)	Jenny Carter; 13,813 (33.0%)	John Harrington (FCP) 3,652 (8.7%); Dean Wasson (CoR) 1,586 (3.8%); Paul Cleveland (G) 325 (0.8%)	Peter Adams
Simcoe Centre Total votes: 41 572	Bruce Owen; 12 869 (31.0%)	Ben Andrews; 10 013 (24.1%)	Paul Wessenger; 15 711(37.8%)	Bonnie Ainsworth (CoR) 2979 (7.2%)	Bruce Owen
Simcoe East Total votes: 37 398	Jim Files; 7219 (19.3%)	Al McLean; 14 828 (39.6%)	Dennis Bailey; 14 088 (37.7%)	John McLean (Lbt) 1263 (3.4%)	Al McLean
Simcoe West Total votes: 32 089	Gary Johnson; 7765 (24.2%)	Jim Wilson; 11 710 (36.5%)	Leo Loserit; 9870 (30.8%)	James McGillivray (FCP) 2744 (8.6%)	George McCague
Victoria—Haliburton Total votes: 34 889	Patrick O'Reilly; 7668 (22.0%)	Ron Jenkins; 8947 (25.6%)	Dennis Drainville; 15 467 (44.3%)	Brad Medd (FCP) 1419 (4.1%); Hugh Boyd; 971 (2.8%); Ron Hawkrigg (Lbt) 417 (1.2%)	John Eakins

=== Durham & York Region ===
Electoral district	Candidates				Incumbent
Electoral district	Liberal	PC	NDP	Other	Incumbent
Durham Centre Total votes: 35,096	Allan Furlong; 10,246 (29.2%)	Jim Flaherty; 9,126 (26.0%)	Drummond White; 12,594 (35.9%)	Nino Maltese (FCP) 1,186 (3.4%); Phil Wyatt (CoR) 1,087 (3.1%); David Hubbell (G) 857 (2.4%)	Allan Furlong
Durham East Total votes: 33 476	Marilyn Pearce; 7836 (23.4%)	Kirk Kemp; 10 907 (32.6%)	Gord Mills; 10 960 (32.7%)	Tim Crookall (FCP) 2487 (7.4%); Harry Turnbridge (CoR) 1286 (3.8%)	Sam Cureatz
Durham West Total votes: 43,678	Norah Stoner; 14,384 (32.9%)	Rick Johnson; 11,167 (25.6%)	Jim Wiseman; 16,366 (37.5%)	Bert Vermeer (FCP) 1,761 (4.0%)	Norah Stoner
Durham—York Total votes: 36 284	Bill Ballinger; 11 067 (30.5%)	Jack Hauseman; 10 904 (30.5%)	Larry O'Connor; 12 297 (33.9%)	Jerry Young (FCP) 2016 (5.6%)	Bill Ballinger
Markham Total votes: 51 221	Frank Scarpitti; 15 128 (29.5%)	Don Cousens; 25 595 (50.0%)	Rob Saunders; 8459 (16.5%)	Eric Skura (FCP) 1086 (2.1%); Ian Hutchison (Lbt) 642 (1.3%); Gary Walsh; 311 (0.6%)	Don Cousens
Oshawa Total votes: 27 173	Jim Carlyle; 5116 (18.8%)	Cliff Fillmore; 3871 (14.2%)	Allan Pilkey; 16 601 (61.1%)	Gary Jones (CoR) 1585 (5.8%)	Michael Breaugh
York Centre Total votes: 61 562	Greg Sorbara; 28 056 (45.6%)	Dion McGuire; 14 656 (23.8%)	Laurie Orrett; 18 850 (30.6%)		Greg Sorbara
York—Mackenzie Total votes: 33,437	Charles Beer; 11,452 (34.3%)	George Timpson; 11,304 (33.8%)	Keith Munro; 10,681 (31.9%)		Charles Beer

=== Scarborough ===
Electoral district	Candidates				Incumbent
Electoral district	Liberal	PC	NDP	Other	Incumbent
Scarborough—Agincourt Total votes: 30 118	Gerry Phillips; 13 347 (44.3%)	Keith MacNab; 8640 (28.7%)	Ayoub Ali; 6763 (22.5%)	Bill Galster (Lbt) 1368 (4.5%)	Gerry Phillips
Scarborough Centre Total votes: 27,262	Cindy Nicholas; 9,256 (34.0%)	Joe Trentadue; 5,682 (20.8%)	Steve Owens; 12,324 (45.2%)		Cindy Nicholas
Scarborough East Total votes: 32 915	Ed Fulton; 9926 (30.2%)	Steve Gilchrist; 9890 (30.0%)	Bob Frankford; 11 700 (35.5%)	Jim McIntosh (Lbt) 577 (1.8%); Cara Mumford (G) 454 (1.4%); Darryl McDowell; 368 (1.1%)	Ed Fulton
Scarborough—Ellesmere Total votes: 29 119	Frank Faubert; 9417 (32.3%)	Greg Vezina; 4855 (16.7%)	David Warner; 14 036 (48.2%)	Kelvin Smith (Lbt) 811 (2.8%)	Frank Faubert
Scarborough North Total votes: 30 056	Alvin Curling; 13 393 (44.6%)	Harold Adams; 5367 (17.9%)	Victor Deane; 9477 (31.5%)	Louis Di Rocco (FCP) 1199 (4.0%); James Greig (G) 620 (2.1%)	Alvin Curling
Scarborough West Total votes: 28 027	Joe Pacione; 6521 (23.3%)	Jim Brown; 5769 (20.6%)	Anne Swarbrick; 14 340 (51.2%)	Stefan Slovak (FCP) 996 (3.6%); George Dance (Lbt) 401 (1.4%)	Richard Johnston

=== North York & East York ===
Electoral district	Candidates				Incumbent
Electoral district	Liberal	PC	NDP	Other	Incumbent
Don Mills Total votes: 28,483	Murad Velshi; 8,786 (30.8%)	Nola Crewe; 7,631 (26.8%)	Margery Ward; 9,740 (34.2%)	David Miller (Lbt) 742 (2.6%); Katherine Mathewson (G) 608 (2.1%); Colin McKay; 562 (2.0%); David Pengelly (F) 414 (1.5%)	Murad Velshi
Downsview Total votes: 23 755	Laureano Leone; 8219 (34.6%)	Chris Smith; 1477 (6.2%)	Anthony Perruzza; 13 440 (56.6%)	David Kenny (Lbt) 619 (2.6%)	Laureano Leone
Lawrence Total votes: 26 364	Joseph Cordiano; 11 786 (44.7%)	Henry Gallay; 3557 (13.5%)	Shalom Schachter; 10 179 (38.6%)	Sandor Hegedus (Lbt) 431 (1.6%); Paul Rombough (G) 411 (1.6%)	Joseph Cordiano
Oriole Total votes: 25 454	Elinor Caplan; 10 655 (41.9%)	Sam Billich; 5435 (21.4%)	Lennox Farrell; 8441 (33.2%)	Roland Brown (Lbt) 578 (2.3%); Greg Knittl (G) 345 (1.4%)	Elinor Caplan
Willowdale Total votes: 33,947	Gino Matrundola; 11,123 (32.7%)	Charles Harnick; 11,957 (35.2%)	Batya Hebdon; 9,125 (26.9%)	Mark Vosylius (FCP) 1,074 (3.2%); Earl Epstein (Lbt) 688 (2.0%)	Gino Matrundola
Wilson Heights Total votes: 27,725	Monte Kwinter; 12,272 (44.3%)	Steven Kerzner; 4,913 (17.7%)	John Fagan; 9,618 (34.7%)	Vanessa Schoor (G) 608 (2.2%); Roman Vrba (Lbt) 314 (1.1%)	Monte Kwinter
York East Total votes: 29 848	Christine Hart; 9900 (33.2%)	George Bryson; 8021 (26.9%)	Gary Malkowski; 10 689 (35.8%)	Jim Copeland; 380 (1.3%); Bedora Bojman (G) 364 (1.2%); John Matthew (Lbt) 303 (1.0%); Chris Frazer (Comm) 191 (0.6%)	Christine Hart
York Mills Total votes: 29 207	Brad Nixon; 10 390 (35.6%)	David Turnbull; 13 037 (44.6%)	Marcia McVea; 4830 (16.5%)	Janet Creery (G) 577 (2.0%); Mary-Anne Sillimaa (Lbt) 373 (1.3%)	Brad Nixon
Yorkview Total votes: 20 059	Claudio Polsinelli; 8326 (41.5%)	Pedro Cordoba; 1254 (6.3%)	Giorgio Mammoliti; 9945 (49.6%)	Roma Kelembet (Lbt) 303 (1.5%); Lucylle Boikoff; 231 (1.2%)	Claudio Polsinelli

=== Toronto ===
Electoral district	Candidates				Incumbent
Electoral district	Liberal	PC	NDP	Other	Incumbent
Beaches—Woodbine Total votes: 24 645	Beryl Potter; 6329 (25.7%)	Kevin Forest; 3535 (14.3%)	Frances Lankin; 14 381 (58.4%)	Sam Vitulli; 400 (1.6%)	Marion Bryden
Dovercourt Total votes: 19 548	Tony Lupusella; 6615 (33.8%)	Allan Brown; 1239 (6.3%)	Tony Silipo; 10 604 (54.2%)	Norman Allen (G) 577 (3.0%); Fred Lambert (Lbt) 513 (2.6%)	Tony Lupusella
Eglinton Total votes: 33 451	Dianne Poole; 12 032 (36.0%)	Anne Vanstone; 11 859 (35.5%)	Jay Waterman; 7772 (23.2%)	Dan King (G) 1340 (4.0%); Scott Bell (Lbt) 448 (1.3%)	Dianne Poole
Fort York Total votes: 23 806	Bob Wong; 9656 (40.6%)	John Pepall; 2258 (9.5%)	Rosario Marchese; 11 023 (46.3%)	Paul Barker (Lbt) 539 (2.3%); Ronald Rodgers; 330 (1.4%)	Bob Wong
High Park—Swansea Total votes: 25 337	David Fleet; 8159 (32.2%)	Yuri Pokaliwsky; 4674 (18.4%)	Elaine Ziemba; 11 432 (45.1%)	Colum Tingle (FCP) 409 (1.6%); Bill Senay (G) 332 (1.3%); Michael Beech (Lbt) 331 (1.3%)	David Fleet
Parkdale Total votes: 17 417	Tony Ruprecht; 8080 (46.4%)	John Swettenham; 941 (5.4%)	Sheena Weir; 7557 (43.4%)	Robert Hunter (G) 325 (1.9%); James McCulloch (Lbt) 241 (1.4%); Debra Stone; 167 (1.0%); Joe Young (Ind [Communist League]) 106 (0.6%)	Tony Ruprecht
Riverdale Total votes: 22 729	Pat Marquis; 5572 (24.5%)	John Ruffolo; 1578 (6.9%)	Marilyn Churley; 14 086 (62.0%)	Leanne Haze (G) 811 (3.6%); Daniel Hunt (Lbt) 682 (3.0%)	David Reville
St. Andrew—St. Patrick Total votes: 29 956	Ron Kanter; 8938 (29.8%)	Nancy Jackman; 9241 (30.8%)	Zanana Akande; 10 321 (34.5%)	Jim Harris (G) 1112 (3.7%); Douglas Quinn (Lbt) 344 (1.1%)	Ron Kanter
St. George—St. David Total votes: 29 706	Ian Scott; 10 718 (36.1%)	Keith Norton; 6955 (23.4%)	Carolann Wright; 10 646 (35.8%)	Ken Campbell (FCP) 932 (3.1%); Beverly Antrobus (Lbt) 455 (1.5%)	Ian Scott

=== Etobicoke & York ===
Electoral district	Candidates				Incumbent
Electoral district	Liberal	PC	NDP	Other	Incumbent
Etobicoke—Humber Total votes: 35 178	Jim Henderson; 13 582 (38.6%)	Aileen Anderson; 9289 (26.4%)	Russ Springate; 10 049 (28.6%)	Tonny Dodds (FCP) 1292 (3.7%); David Moore (G) 586 (1.7%); Alan D'Orsay (Lbt) 380 (1.1%)	Jim Henderson
Etobicoke—Lakeshore Total votes: 31 660	Sam Shephard; 7006 (22.1%)	Jeff Knoll; 4854 (15.3%)	Ruth Grier; 18 118 (57.2%)	Trish O'Connor (FCP) 1053 (3.3%); Phaedra Livingstone (G) 629 (2.0%)	Ruth Grier
Etobicoke—Rexdale Total votes: 26 270	Aurelio Acquaviva; 4585 (17.5%)	David Foster; 3243 (12.3%)	Ed Philip; 17 620 (67.0%)	David Burman (G) 822 (3.1%)	Ed Philip
Etobicoke West Total votes: 33 810	Linda LeBourdais; 10 082 (29.8%)	Chris Stockwell; 13 713 (40.6%)	Judy Jones; 7992 (23.6%)	Kevin McGourty (FCP) 1045 (3.1%); Geoffrey Lepper (G) 354 (1.0%); Janice Hazlett (Lbt) 320 (1.0%); Martin Fraser; 304 (0.9%)	Linda LeBourdais
Oakwood Total votes: 21 384	Chaviva Hošek; 8143 (38.1%)	Claudio Lewis; 1671 (7.8%)	Tony Rizzo; 10 423 (48.7%)	Steven Peck (G) 595 (2.8%); John Primerano (Lbt) 355 (1.7%); Elizabeth Rowley (Comm) 197 (0.9%)	Chaviva Hošek
York South Total votes: 24 949	Ozzie Grant; 4534 (18.2%)	Andrew Feldstein; 2561 (10.3%)	Bob Rae; 16 642 (66.7%)	Alex MacDonald (Lbt) 759 (3.0%); Phil Sarazen (G) 453 (1.8%)	Bob Rae

=== Brampton, Mississauga & Halton ===
Electoral district	Candidates				Incumbent
Electoral district	Liberal	PC	NDP	Other	Incumbent
Brampton North Total votes: 33,462	Carman McClelland; 11,686 (34.9%)	Gary Heighington; 7,619 (22.8%)	John Devries; 11,588 (34.6%)	Margaret Lloyd (FCP) 1,466 (4.4%); Lewis Jackson (Lbt) 669 (2.0%); Martha MacDonald 434 (1.3%)	Carman McClelland
Brampton South Total votes: 39 985	Bob Callahan; 12 918 (32.3%)	Maggie McCallion; 11 395 (28.5%)	John Scheer; 12 494 (31.2%)	Ron Nonato (FCP) 2511 (6.3%); Jim Bridgewood (Comm) 667 (1.7%)	Bob Callahan
Burlington South Total votes: 32 520	Marv Townsend; 5544 (17.0%)	Cam Jackson; 17 084 (52.5%)	Bob Wood; 8185 (25.2%)	Don Pennell (FCP) 1707 (5.2%)	Cam Jackson
Halton Centre Total votes: 38 523	Barbara Sullivan; 13 494 (35.0%)	Bob Taylor; 12 279 (31.9%)	Richard Banigan; 10 163 (26.4%)	James Bruce (FCP) 1232 (3.2%); Bill Frampton (FP) 731 (1.9%); Jim Stock (Lbt) 624 (1.6%)	Barbara Sullivan
Halton North Total votes: 27,503	Walt Elliot; 7,962 (29.0%)	Dave Whiting; 7,499 (27.3%)	Noel Duignan; 8,510 (30.9%)	Giuseppe Gori (FCP) 2,489 (9.1%); Patricia Kammerer (G) 582 (2.1%) John Shadbolt (Lbt) 461 (1.7%)	Walt Elliot
Mississauga East Total votes: 31 684	John Sola; 12 448 (39.3%)	Brad Butt; 8285 (26.1%)	Mike Crone; 9177 (29.0%)	Peter Sesek; 1363 (4.3%); Chris Balabanian (F) 411 (1.3%)	John Sola
Mississauga North Total votes: 33 442	Steve Offer; 12 658 (37.9%)	John Snobelen; 7990 (23.9%)	John Foster; 11 216 (33.5%)	Ken Moores (G) 946 (2.8%); Howard Baker; 632 (1.9%)	Steve Offer
Mississauga South Total votes: 32 652	Donna Scott; 6624 (20.3%)	Margaret Marland; 17 126 (52.5%)	Sue Craig; 7579 (23.2%)	Scott McWhinnie (G) 1323 (4.1%)	Margaret Marland
Mississauga West Total votes: 47 584	Steve Mahoney; 20 038 (42.1%)	Judi Bachman; 11 945 (25.1%)	Tom Malone; 13 938 (29.3%)	Emanuel Batler (Lbt) 892 (1.9%); Dian Achiceko; 771 (1.6%)	Steve Mahoney
Oakville South Total votes: 31,304	Doug Carrothers; 10,841 (34.6%)	Gary Carr; 10,949 (35.0%)	Danny Dunleavy; 6,423 (20.5%)	Terry Hansford (CoR) 1,057 (3.4%); Josef Petriska (G) 1,038 (3.3%); Adriana Bassi (FCP) 996 (3.2%)	Doug Carrothers

=== Hamilton-Wentworth & Niagara ===
Electoral district	Candidates				Incumbent
Electoral district	Liberal	PC	NDP	Other	Incumbent
Hamilton Centre Total votes: 25 358	Lily Oddie Munro; 7814 (30.8%)	Graham Snelgrove; 2116 (8.3%)	David Christopherson; 14 029 (55.3%)	Brent Monkley (G) 605 (2.4%); Julien Frost (Lbt) 429 (1.7%); Jewell Wolgram (FCP) 365 (1.4%)	Lily Oddie Munro
Hamilton East Total votes: 28 336	Craig Dowhaniuk; 5525 (19.5%)	Rom Tomblin; 1676 (5.9%)	Robert W. Mackenzie; 20 289 (71.6%)	Emidio Corvaro (FCP) 846 (3.0%)	Robert W. Mackenzie
Hamilton Mountain Total votes: 37 629	Al Bailey; 7432 (19.8%)	Grant Darby; 7709 (20.5%)	Brian Charlton; 22 488 (59.8%)		Brian Charlton
Hamilton West Total votes: 32 777	Helen Wilson; 7236 (22.1%)	David Cairnie; 4361 (13.3%)	Richard Allen; 18 550 (56.6%)	Lynne Scime (FCP) 2324 (7.1%); Hans Wienhold (CoR) 306 (0.9%)	Richard Allen
Lincoln Total votes: 34,141	Harry Pelissero; 11,055 (32.4%)	Carol Walker; 9,407 (27.6%)	Ron Hansen; 12,117 (35.5%)	Doug Bougher (CoR) 1,562 (4.6%)	Harry Pelissero
Niagara Falls Total votes: 29 939	Wayne Campbell; 7979 (26.7%)	Norm Puttick; 3896 (13.0%)	Margaret Harrington; 13 884 (46.4%)	Ted Wiwchar (CoR) 3141 (10.5%); Art Klassen (FCP) 674 (2.3%); Donald MacDonald-Ross (G) 365 (1.2%)	Vince Kerrio
Niagara South Total votes: 23 972	John Lopinski; 7232 (30.2%)	Doug Martin; 4032 (16.8%)	Shirley Coppen; 11 161 (46.6%)	Glen Hutton (CoR) 1547 (6.5%)	Ray Haggerty
St. Catharines Total votes: 29 835	Jim Bradley; 11 565 (38.8%)	Bruce Timms; 3926 (13.2%)	Dave Kappele; 10 629 (35.6%)	Eva Longhurst (CoR) 2384 (8.0%); Bert Pynenburg (FCP) 1331 (4.5%)	Jim Bradley
St. Catharines—Brock Total votes: 27,478	Mike Dietsch; 8,379 (30.5%)	Bob Welch; 6,969 (25.4%)	Christel Haeck; 9,538 (34.7%)	Rodney Book (CoR) 1,449 (5.3%); Ed Klassen (FCP) 873 (3.2%); Conrad Gibbons (Lbt) 270 (1.0%)	Mike Dietsch
Welland—Thorold Total votes: 32 202	Gord McMillan; 7557 (23.5%)	Cam Wilson; 2893 (9.0%)	Peter Kormos; 20488 (63.6%)	John Sabados (CoR) 878 (2.7%); Barry Fitzgerald (F) 386 (1.2%)	Peter Kormos
Wentworth East Total votes: 34 111	Shirley Collins; 12 077 (35.4%)	Doug Conley; 5609 (16.4%)	Mark Morrow; 15 224 (44.6%)	Victor Kammerer (G) 668 (2.0%); Albert Papazian; 273 (0.8%); Anne Stasiuk; 260 (0.8%)	Shirley Collins
Wentworth North Total votes: 33 692	Chris Ward; 11 384 (33.9%)	Don Matthews; 8740 (25.9%)	Don Abel; 11 472 (34.0%)	Rien Vanden Enden (FCP) 1236 (3.7%); Eileen Butson (CoR) 860 (2.6%)	Chris Ward

=== Midwestern Ontario ===
Electoral district	Candidates				Incumbent
Electoral district	Liberal	PC	NDP	Other	Incumbent
Brantford Total votes: 36 474	Dave Neumann; 13 644 (37.4%)	Dan Di Sabatino; 3087 (8.5%)	Brad Ward; 17 736 (48.6%)	Peter Quail (FCP) 1413 (3.9%); William Darfler (G) 436 (1.2%); Helmut Kurmis (Lbt) 158 (0.4%)	Dave Neumann
Brant—Haldimand Total votes: 28 785	Robert Nixon; 10 751 (37.3%)	Brett Kelly; 6228 (21.6%)	Chris Stanek; 9282 (32.2%)	Steve Elgersma (FCP) 1520 (5.3%); Jamie Legacey (G) 1004 (3.5%)	Robert Nixon
Cambridge Total votes: 36 176	John Bell; 7557 (20.9%)	Carl DeFaria; 4449 (12.3%)	Mike Farnan; 21 806 (60.3%)	Anneliese Steden (FCP) 2364 (6.5%)	Mike Farnan
Guelph Total votes: 39 701	Rick Ferraro; 11 944 (30.1%)	Linda Lennon; 10 184 (25.7%)	Derek Fletcher; 15 051 (37.9%)	John Gots (FCP) 1602 (4.0%); Bill Hulet (G) 920 (2.3%)	Rick Ferraro
Huron Total votes: 29 070	Jim Fitzgerald; 6653 (22.9%)	Ken Campbell; 9066 (31.2%)	Paul Klopp; 10 020 (34.5%)	Tom Clark (FCP) 2931 (10.1%); Allan Dettweiler (Lbt) 400 (1.4%)	Jack Riddell
Kitchener Total votes: 33 640	David Cooke; 9731 (28.9%)	Ian Matthew; 6157 (18.3%)	Will Ferguson; 15 750 (46.8%)	John Meenan (FCP) 2002 (6.0%)	David Cooke
Kitchener—Wilmot Total votes: 36 537	Carl Zehr; 10 869 (29.7%)	Lance Bryant; 7342 (20.1%)	Mike Cooper; 16 056 (43.9%)	Thomas Borys (FCP) 2270 (6.2%)	John Sweeney
Norfolk Total votes: 36 195	Gord Miller; 10 971 (30.3%)	Clarence Abbott; 10 374 (28.7%)	Norm Jamison; 14 850 (41.0%)		Gord Miller
Oxford Total votes: 36 504	Charlie Tatham; 9802 (26.9%)	Jim Wilkins; 9860 (27.0%)	Kimble Sutherland; 12 684 (34.7%)	John Joosse (FCP) 3182 (8.7%); Kaye Sargent (Lbt) 635 (1.7%); Joe Byway (F) 341 (0.9%)	Charlie Tatham
Perth Total votes: 31 802	Gerry Teahen; 8721 (27.4%)	Ron Christie; 8600 (27.0%)	Karen Haslam; 11 712 (36.8%)	Gordon Maloney (FCP) 2769 (8.7%)	Hugh Edighoffer
Waterloo North Total votes: 38 883	Andrew Telegdi; 9441 (24.3%)	Elizabeth Witmer; 14 552 (37.4%)	Hugh Miller; 11 298 (29.1%)	Ted Kryn (FCP) 2946 (7.6%); Rita Huschka-Sprague (Lbt) 646 (1.7%)	Herb Epp
Wellington Total votes: 30 646	John Green; 7668 (25.0%)	Ted Arnott; 12 141 (39.6%)	Dale Hamilton; 10 837 (35.4%)		Jack Johnson

=== Southwestern Ontario ===
Electoral district	Candidates				Incumbent
Electoral district	Liberal	PC	NDP	Other	Incumbent
Chatham—Kent Total votes: 31,138	Maurice Bossy; 9,963 (32.0%)	Charlie Tomecek; 5,619 (18.0%)	Randy Hope; 13,930 (44.7%)	Marcy Edwards (FCP) 1,626 (5.2%)	Maurice Bossy
Elgin Total votes: 34 047	Marietta Roberts; 9723 (28.6%)	Jim Williams; 9031 (26.5%)	Peter North; 14 189 (41.7%)	Ray Monteith (F) 1104 (3.2%)	Marietta Roberts
Essex-Kent Total votes: 30 116	Jim McGuigan; 9968 (33.1%)	Claire Atkinson; 2739 (9.1%)	Pat Hayes; 15 858 (52.7%)	Tim McGuire (FCP) 1551 (5.2%)	Jim McGuigan
Essex South Total votes: 29 358	Remo Mancini; 10 575 (36.0%)	Joan Flood; 6335 (21.6%)	Donna Tremblay; 10 363 (35.3%)	Steve Posthumus (FCP) 2085 (7.1%)	Remo Mancini
Lambton Total votes: 27,675	David William Smith; 7,291 (26.3%)	Bob Langstaff; 7,665 (27.7%)	Ellen MacKinnon; 8,691 (31.4%)	Jim Hopper (FCP) 3,557 (12.9%); Kim Beatson (CoR) 471 (1.7%)	David Smith
London Centre Total votes: 34 765	David Peterson; 9671 (27.8%)	Mark Handelman; 5348 (15.4%)	Marion Boyd; 17 837 (51.3%)	John Van Geldersen (FCP) 982 (2.8%); Lloyd Walker (F) 498 (1.4%); Terry Smart; 272 (0.8%); Issam Mansour (Comm) 84 (0.2%); Sidney Tarleton; 73 (0.2%)	David Peterson
London North Total votes: 43 770	Steve Buchanan; 9990 (22.8%)	Dianne Cunningham; 18 079 (41.3%)	Carolyn Davies; 14 005 (32.0%)	Bob Maniuk (FCP) 1095 (2.5%); Jack Plant (F) 601 (1.4%)	Dianne Cunningham
London South Total votes: 41 115	Joan Smith; 11 787 (28.7%)	Bob Wood; 9828 (23.9%)	David Winninger; 17 438 (42.4%)	Paul Picard (FCP) 1427 (3.5%); Robert Metz (FP) 635 (1.5%)	Joan Smith
Middlesex Total votes: 38 382	Doug Reycraft; 12 002 (31.3%)	Gordon Hardcastle; 8957 (23.3%)	Irene Mathyssen; 12 522 (32.6%)	Bill Giesen (FCP) 4007 (10.4%); Barry Malcolm (F) 894 (2.3%)	Doug Reycraft
Sarnia Total votes: 29 586	Mike Bradley; 8540 (28.9%)	Mike Stark; 6269 (21.2%)	Bob Huget; 10 860 (36.7%)	Terry Burrell (FCP) 2691 (9.1%); Bill Ferguson (CoR) 652 (2.2%); Margaret Coe] (Lbt) 574 (1.9%)	Andy Brandt
Windsor—Riverside Total votes: 29 769	Doreen Oullette; 6640 (22.3%)	Vivian Tregunna; 1096 (3.7%)	Dave Cooke; 21 144 (71.0%)	Earl Amyotte (FCP) 889 (3.0%)	Dave Cooke
Windsor—Sandwich Total votes: 29 298	Bill Wrye; 11 807 (40.5%)	Merv de Pendleton; 1186 (4.0%)	George Dadamo; 15 952 (54.4)	Joe Crouchman; 353 (1.2%)	Bill Wrye
Windsor—Walkerville Total votes: 28 807	Mike Ray; 11 581 (40.2%)	François Michaud; 1327 (4.7%)	Wayne Lessard; 15 899 (55.2%)		Mike Ray

=== Northeastern Ontario ===
Electoral district	Candidates				Incumbent
Electoral district	Liberal	PC	NDP	Other	Incumbent
Algoma Total votes: 14 017	Bob Gallagher; 3573 (25.5%)	Denis Latulippe; 433 (3.1%)	Bud Wildman; 8221 (58.7%)	Stan Down (CoR) 1790 (12.8%)	Bud Wildman
Algoma—Manitoulin Total votes: 15 339	Mike Brown; 5961 (38.9%)	Ken Ferguson; 2163 (14.1%)	Lois Miller; 5754 (37.5%)	Richard Hammond (CoR) 1114 (7.3%); Gene Solomon; 347 (2.3%)	Mike Brown
Cochrane North Total votes: 16 354	Donald Grenier; 6475 (39.6%)	René Piché; 3261 (20.0%)	Len Wood; 6618 (40.5%)		René Fontaine
Cochrane South Total votes: 24 069	Frank Krznaric; 9361 (38.9%)	Tina Positano; 1019 (4.2%)	Gilles Bisson; 11 460 (47.6%)	Ken Metsala (CoR) 2229 (9.3%)	Alan Pope
Nickel Belt Total votes: 16 955	Betty Rheaume; 3267 (19.3%)	Paul Demers; 967 (5.7%)	Floyd Laughren; 9925 (58.5%)	Grenville Rogers (CoR) 2796 (16.5%)	Floyd Laughren
Nipissing Total votes: 33 741	Stan Lawlor; 10 745 (31.8%)	Mike Harris; 15 469 (45.8%)	Dawson Pratt; 7039 (20.9%)	Edward Gauthier (FCP) 488 (1.4%)	Mike Harris
Parry Sound Total votes: 23 020	Randy Sheppard; 5125 (22.3%)	Ernie Eves; 10 078 (43.8%)	Joe Boissonneault; 2993 (13.0%)	Richard Thomas (G) 4061 (17.6%); Julia Duggan (FCP) 763 (3.3%)	Ernie Eves
Sault Ste. Marie Total votes: 38 713	Don MacGregor; 13 339 (34.5%)	John Solski; 3347 (8.6%)	Tony Martin; 14 036 (36.3%)	Don Edwards (CoR) 7991 (20.6%)	Karl Morin-Strom
Sudbury Total votes: 32,530	Sterling Campbell; 10,010 (30.8%)	Mike Franceschini; 3,318 (10.2%)	Sharon Murdock; 13,407 (41.2%)	Billie Christiansen (CoR) 5,795 (17.8%)	Sterling Campbell
Sudbury East Total votes: 30 232	Jean-Yves Robert; 7484 (24.8%)	John Johnson; 1458 (4.8%)	Shelley Martel; 17 536 (58.0%)	Greg Bigger (CoR) 3754 (12.4%)	Shelley Martel
Timiskaming Total votes: 19,779	David Ramsay; 8,364 (42.3%)	Garfield Pinkerton; 2,261 (11.4%)	Michelle Evans; 6,191 (31.3%)	James Fawcett (CoR) 2,250 (11.4%); Doug Fraser (G) 713 (3.6%)	David Ramsay

=== Northwestern Ontario ===
Electoral district	Candidates				Incumbent
Electoral district	Liberal	PC	NDP	Other	Incumbent
Fort William Total votes: 26,551	Lyn McLeod; 11,798 (44.4%)	Harold Wilson; 4,300 (16.2%)	Don Hutsul; 10,453 (39.4%)		Lyn McLeod
Kenora Total votes: 20 106	Frank Miclash; 8152 (40.5%)	Dean McIntyre; 1776 (8.8%)	Doug Miranda; 7821 (38.9%)	Henry Wetelainen; 2357 (11.7%)	Frank Miclash
Lake Nipigon Total votes: 12,785	Judy Tinnes; 3,083 (24.1%)	Jim Vibert; 735 (5.7%)	Gilles Pouliot; 8,335 (65.2%)	Bill Thibeault (FCP) 632 (5.0%)	Gilles Pouliot
Port Arthur Total votes: 27 798	Taras Kozyra; 10 885 (39.2%)	Tony Stehmann; 3854 (13.9%)	Shelley Wark-Martyn; 11 919 (42.9%)	Claude Wyspianspki (FCP) 1140 (4.1%)	Taras Kozyra
Rainy River Total votes: 12 751	Dennis Brown; 3878 (30.4%)	Bob Davidson; 1035 (8.1%)	Howard Hampton; 7838 (61.5%)		Howard Hampton
