= Rae ministry =

Cabinet of Ontario, 1990–1995

- 21st ministry of Ontario

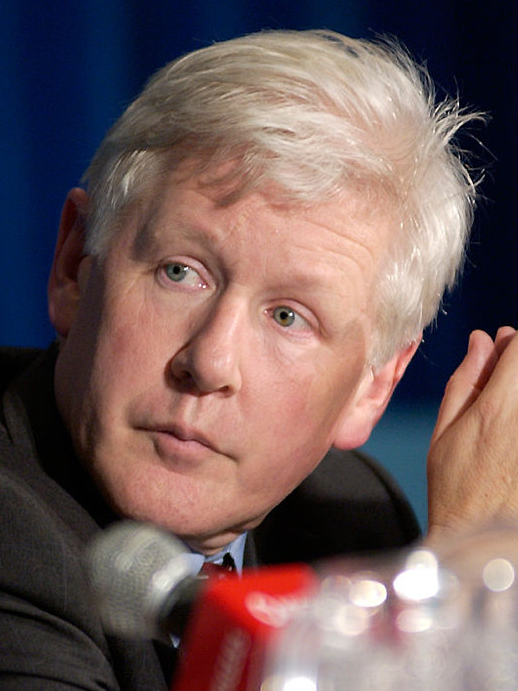
- Premier Bob Rae
- Date formed: October 1, 1990
- Date dissolved: June 25, 1995

People and organisations
- Monarch: Elizabeth II
- Lieutenant Governor: Lincoln Alexander (1990-1991); Hal Jackman (1991-1995)
- Premier: Bob Rae
- Deputy Premier: Floyd Laughren
- Member party: NDP
- Status in legislature: Majority (1990-1995)
- Opposition party: Liberal

History
- Incoming formation: 1990 Ontario general election
- Outgoing formation: 1995 Ontario general election
- Election: 2003
- Legislature term: 35th Parliament of Ontario
- Predecessor: Peterson ministry
- Successor: Harris ministry

The Rae ministry was the combined cabinet (formally the Executive Council of Ontario) that governed Ontario from October 1, 1990, to June 26, 1995. It was led by the 21st Premier of Ontario, Bob Rae. The ministry was made up of members of the Ontario New Democratic Party, which commanded a majority in the Legislative Assembly of Ontario.

The ministry replaced the Peterson ministry following the 1990 Ontario general election. The ministry governed through all of the 35th Parliament of Ontario.

After the Progressive Conservative Party of Ontario secured a majority in the 1995 Ontario general election, Rae resigned, and was succeeded as Premier of Ontario by Mike Harris.

== History ==
=== The Rae Ministry is formed ===
There were 28 portfolios at the beginning of the Rae ministry (including the Premiership). There was only one instance of ministerial portfolio reorganisation as Rae took over from Peterson: Solicitor General and Ministry of Correctional Services were combined into "Solicitor General and Minister of Correctional Services".

=== Early Changes ===
The first big change to come to the Rae ministry was the departure of Peter Kormos as Minister of Consumer and Commercial Relations and Minister of Financial Institutions on April 18, 1991, just past the six month mark of the mandate. Kormos had been tasked to implement a public auto insurance system, one of the promises of the recent election campaign, but partly because Kormos was such a disruptive presence in the ministry, and partly because the party would soon abandon that promise, Kormos was dismissed from the ministry. He was succeeded at Consumer and Commercial Relations by Marilyn Churley and at Financial Institutions by Brian Charlton, both newly appointed cabinet ministers.

A month later, on April 18, 1991, Evelyn Gigantes became the second high-profile departure, stepping down after violating the confidentiality of an Ontarian seeking treatment outside of Canada. She was replaced as Minister of Health by Frances Lankin, who surrendered her Ministry of Government Services portfolio to newly appointed cabinet minister Fred Wilson.

There were two instances of ministerial portfolio reorganisation:

- Ministry of Municipal Affairs and Housing was divided into a "Ministry of Municipal Affairs", and a "Ministry of Housing".
- Ministry of Northern Development and Ministry of Mines were combined into the "Ministry of Northern Development and Mines".

In the months to come, more members stepped down: Zanana Akande resigned in a conflict of interest scandal October 10, 1991; newly appointed cabinet minister William Ferguson resigned February 12, 1992 from his post as Minister of Energy from her post as Minister of Community and Social Services amid allegations of having committed a sexual assault while working as a correctional officer at a girl's reform school in the 1970s (he was later acquitted); and Peter North resigned on November 13, 1992, from his post as Minister of Tourism and Recreation amid allegations of having offered a job to a person he was hoping to start a relationship with.

=== Ministers without portfolio in Ontario, 1993–1995 ===
On February 3, 1993, Ontario Premier Bob Rae appointed six ministers without portfolio in the Ontario government. These were not full members of the cabinet but rather provided policy assistance to cabinet ministers. They were generally described as "junior ministers." The only one of the original six ministers without portfolio who was assigned a specific job responsibility was Richard Allen, who oversaw international trade. The others didn't define the responsibilities formally. Some opposition politicians argued that these positions were unnecessary and duplicated the responsibilities of parliamentary assistants.

Richard Allen was appointed minister responsible for economic development. He held this position from February 3, 1993, to August 18, 1994, when he was promoted to a full cabinet position. His replacement was Bob Huget, who served until June 26, 1995. Brad Ward was appointed minister responsible for finance. held this position from February 3, 1993, to June 26, 1995, assisting Finance Minister Floyd Laughren. In 1994, he was tasked with coordinating and overseeing the government's public pre-budget consultations, a series of province-wide meetings designed to gather input from business leaders, labor representatives, and community organizations on spending priorities and taxation policy. Ward's involvement reflected the government's effort to demonstrate openness and public engagement in budget formation, a relatively new approach at the time. He contributed to policy discussions related to deficit reduction, social program funding, and economic recovery strategies, complementing the broader fiscal direction established by Minister Laughren.

Shirley Coppen was appointed minister responsible for culture, tourism, and recreation. She held this position from February 3, 1993, to October 21, 1994, when she was promoted to a full cabinet position. Her replacement was Irene Mathyssen, who served until June 26, 1995. Karen Haslam was appointed minister responsible for health. She held this position from February 3 to June 14, 1993, when she resigned to protest the Rae government's Social Contact legislation. Her replacement was Shelley Wark-Martyn, who served until June 26, 1995. Allan Pilkey was appointed minister responsible for municipal affairs. He held this position from February 3, 1993, to June 26, 1995. Shelley Wark-Martyn was appointed minister responsible for education and training. She held this position from February 3 until June 17, 1993, when she was reassigned as Minister without portfolio responsible for Health. Her replacement was Mike Farnan, who served until his promotion to a full cabinet portfolio on October 21, 1994. Farnan, in turn, was replaced by Steve Owens, who served until June 26, 1995.

Chief Government Whip Fred Wilson was also designated as a minister without portfolio in February 1993. His responsibilities were distinct from the other ministers without portfolio, and he was not considered a "junior minister."

The positions were eliminated in 1995 by the government of Mike Harris.

=== The Last Days of Rae ===
Only eleven cabinet members held their seats (including three of the contestants of the soon to be conducted 1996 Ontario New Democratic Party leadership election, Tony Silipo, Frances Lankin, and the winner of that contest, Howard Hampton) and the NDP caucus shrank from 74 to 17.

== Summary ==
33 people served in the Rae ministry. Thirteen were women.

Zanana Akande was the only person of colour to serve; she was Minister of Community and Social Services from October 1, 1990, to October 10, 1991.

Everyone who served in the cabinet was culturally Christian; this was the last time Ontario had an all-Christian ministry. Bob Rae has strong family ties to the Jewish faith (including a Jewish wife, Arlene Perly Rae), and he is a member of Holy Blossom Temple, a Reform Jewish congregation in Toronto, but he was raised Anglican and has never formally converted to Judaism.

The Rae ministry began with 26 cabinet members and ended with 22; it began with 27 portfolios and ended with 21. It is unusual for ministries to shrink in size in either respect.

== List of ministers ==
Rae Ministry by Leadership Position
Position	Minister	Tenure	
Position	Minister	Start	End
Premier of Ontario	Bob Rae	October 1, 1990	June 25, 1995
Deputy Premier of Ontario	Floyd Laughren	October 1, 1990	June 25, 1995
House Leader	Shelley Martel	October 1, 1990	July 31, 1991
House Leader	Dave Cooke	July 31, 1991	April 28, 1995
Chief Whip	Shirley Coppen	October 1, 1990	February 3, 1993
Chief Whip	Fred Wilson	February 3, 1993	June 25, 1995

Rae ministry by portfolio
Portfolio	Minister	Tenure	
Portfolio	Minister	Start	End
Chair of the Management Board of Cabinet	Frances Lankin	October 1, 1990	July 31, 1991
Chair of the Management Board of Cabinet	Tony Silipo	July 31, 1991	September 23, 1992
Chair of the Management Board of Cabinet	Dave Cooke	September 23, 1992	February 3, 1993
Chair of the Management Board of Cabinet	Brian Charlton	February 3, 1993	June 25, 1995
Minister of Agriculture, Food and Rural Affairs (Note: named "Ministry of Agriculture and Food" from October 1, 1990 to March 9, 1994.)	Elmer Buchanan	October 1, 1990	June 25, 1995
Attorney General (Note: named "Ministry of Justice and Attorney General" from February 3, 1993 to June 25, 1995.)	Howard Hampton	October 1, 1990	February 3, 1993
Attorney General	Marion Boyd	February 3, 1993	June 25, 1995
Minister of Citizenship	Elaine Ziemba	October 1, 1990	June 25, 1995
Ministry of Colleges and Universities	Richard Allen	October 1, 1990	February 3, 1993
Ministry of Colleges and Universities	merged with Education and Training	February 3, 1993	June 25, 1995
Minister of Community and Social Services	Zanana Akande	October 1, 1990	October 10, 1991
Minister of Community and Social Services	Marion Boyd	October 15, 1991	February 3, 1993
Minister of Community and Social Services	Tony Silipo	February 3, 1993	June 25, 1995
Minister of Consumer and Commercial Relations	Peter Kormos	October 1, 1990	March 18, 1991
Minister of Consumer and Commercial Relations	Marilyn Churley	March 18, 1991	June 25, 1995
Minister of Culture and Communication	Rosario Marchese	October 1, 1990	July 31, 1991
Minister of Culture and Communication	Karen Haslam	July 31, 1991	February 3, 1993
Minister of Culture and Communication	merged with Tourism and Recreation	February 3, 1993	June 25, 1995
Minister of Education (Note: named "Minister of Education and Training from February 3, 1993 to June 25, 1995.)	Marion Boyd	October 1, 1990	October 15, 1991
Minister of Education	Tony Silipo	October 15, 1991	February 3, 1993
Minister of Education	Dave Cooke	February 3, 1993	June 25, 1995
Minister of Energy	Jenny Carter	October 1, 1990	July 31, 1991
Minister of Energy	Will Ferguson	July 31, 1991	February 13, 1992
Minister of Energy	Brian Charlton	February 13, 1992	February 3, 1993
Minister of Energy	merged with Environment	February 3, 1993	June 25, 1995
Minister of the Environment	Ruth Grier	October 1, 1990	February 3, 1993
Minister of the Environment	merged with Energy	February 3, 1993	June 25, 1995
Minister of the Environment and Energy (Note: created February 3, 1993 by merger of "Ministry of Energy" and "Ministry of Environment.")	Bud Wildman	February 3, 1993	June 25, 1995
Minister of Finance (Note: called "Treasurer and Minister of Economics" from October 1, 1990 to February 3, 1993.)	Floyd Laughren	October 1, 1990	June 25, 1995
Minister of Financial; Institutions	Peter Kormos	October 1, 1990	March 18, 1991
Minister of Financial; Institutions	Brian Charlton	March 18, 1991	February 3, 1993
Minister of Financial; Institutions	merged with Chair of Management; Board	February 3, 1993	June 25, 1995
Minister of Government Services	Frances Lankin	October 1, 1990	April 22, 1991
Minister of Government Services	Fred Wilson	April 22, 1991	February 3, 1993
Minister of Government Services	merged with Chair of Management Board	February 3, 1993	June 25, 1995
Minister of Health	Evelyn Gigantes	October 1, 1990	April 18, 1991
Minister of Health	Frances Lankin	April 22, 1991	February 3, 1993
Minister of Health	Ruth Grier	February 3, 1993	June 25, 1995
Minister of Intergovernmental Affairs	Bob Rae	October 1, 1990	June 25, 1995
Minister of Industry, Trade and Technology (Note: renamed "Minister of Economic Development and Trade" from February 3, 1993 to June 25, 1995.)	Allan Pilkey	October 1, 1990	July 31, 1991
Minister of Industry, Trade and Technology	Ed Philip	July 31, 1991	February 3, 1993
Minister of Industry, Trade and Technology	Frances Lankin	February 3, 1993	June 25, 1995
Minister of Labour	Bob Mackenzie	October 1, 1990	October 20, 1994
Minister of Labour	Shirley Coppen	October 20, 1994	June 25, 1995
Minister of Municipal Affairs and Housing (Note: divided into the "Ministry of Municipal Affairs" and the "Ministry of Housing" July 31, 1991.)	Dave Cooke	October 1, 1990	July 31, 1991
Minister of Municipal Affairs	merged with Housing	October 1, 1990	July 31, 1991
Minister of Municipal Affairs	Dave Cooke	July 31, 1991	February 3, 1993
Minister of Municipal Affairs	Ed Philip	February 3, 1993	June 25, 1995
Minister of Housing	merged with Municipal Affairs	October 1, 1990	July 31, 1991
Minister of Housing	Evelyn Gigantes	July 31, 1991	August 18, 1994
Minister of Housing	Richard Allen	August 22, 1994	June 25, 1995
Minister of Natural Resources	Bud Wildman	October 1, 1990	February 3, 1993
Minister of Natural Resources	Howard Hampton	February 3, 1993	June 25, 1995
Minister of Northern Development	Shelley Martel	October 1, 1990	July 31, 1991
Minister of Northern Development	merged with Mines	July 31, 1991	June 25, 1995
Minister of Mines	Gilles Pouliot	October 1, 1990	July 31, 1991
Minister of Mines	merged with Northern; Development	July 31, 1991	June 25, 1995
Minister of Northern Development and Mines (Note: created July 31, 1991 in a merger of "Ministry Mines" and "Ministry of Northern Development")	Shelley Martel	July 31, 1991	October 7, 1994
Minister of Northern Development and Mines	Gilles Pouliot	October 7, 1994	June 25, 1995
Minister Responsible for Disabled Persons	Elaine Ziemba	October 1, 1990	June 25, 1995
Minister Responsible for Francophone Affairs	Gilles Pouliot	October 1, 1990	June 25, 1995
Minister Responsible for Native Affairs	Bud Wildman	October 1, 1990	February 3, 1993
Minister Responsible for Native Affairs	Howard Hampton	February 3, 1993	June 25, 1995
Minister Responsible for Seniors	Elaine Ziemba	October 1, 1990	June 25, 1995
Minister Responsible for Women's Issues	Anne Swarbrick	October 1, 1990	September 11, 1991
Minister Responsible for Women's Issues	Marion Boyd	September 11, 1991	June 25, 1995
Minister of Revenue	Shelley Wark-Martyn	October 1, 1990	February 3, 1993
Minister of Revenue	merged with Finance	February 3, 1993	June 25, 1995
Ministry of Skills Development	Richard Allen	October 1, 1990	February 3, 1993
Ministry of Skills Development	merged with Colleges and Universities	February 3, 1993	June 25, 1995
Minister of Tourism and Recreation (Note: named "Ministry of Culture, Tourism, and Recreation" from February 3, 1993 to June 25, 1995.)	Peter North	October 1, 1990	November 13, 1992
Minister of Tourism and Recreation	Ed Philip	November 13, 1992	February 3, 1993
Minister of Tourism and Recreation	Anne Swarbrick	February 3, 1993	June 25, 1995
Minister of Transportation	Ed Philip	October 1, 1990	July 31, 1991
Minister of Transportation	Gilles Pouliot	July 31, 1991	October 21, 1994
Minister of Transportation	Mike Farnan	October 21, 1994	June 25, 1995
Ministers; Without Portfolios	Shirley Coppen	October 1, 1990	October 21, 1994
Ministers; Without Portfolios	Anne Swarbrick	October 1, 1990	September 11, 1991
Ministers; Without Portfolios	Richard Allen	February 3, 1993	August 18, 1994
Ministers; Without Portfolios	Karen Haslam	February 3, 1993	June 14, 1993
Ministers; Without Portfolios	Allan Pilkey	February 3, 1993	June 25, 1995
Ministers; Without Portfolios	Fred Wilson	February 3, 1993	June 25, 1995
Ministers; Without Portfolios	Mike Farnan	June 17, 1993	October 21, 1994
Solicitor General and Minister of Correctional Services (Note: briefly divided into "Solicitor General" and "Minister of Correctional Services" from September 23, 1992 to February 3, 1993.)	Mike Farnan	October 1, 1990	July 31, 1991
Solicitor General and Minister of Correctional Services	Allan Pilkey	July 31, 1991	September 23, 1992
Solicitor General and Minister of Correctional Services	Allan Pilkey (only Solicitor General)	September 23, 1992	February 3, 1993
Solicitor General and Minister of Correctional Services	David Christopherson (only Correctional; Services)	September 23, 1992	February 3, 1993
Solicitor General and Minister of Correctional Services	David Christopherson	February 3, 1993	June 25, 1995
