= 1996 Ontario New Democratic Party leadership election =

- June 22, 1996
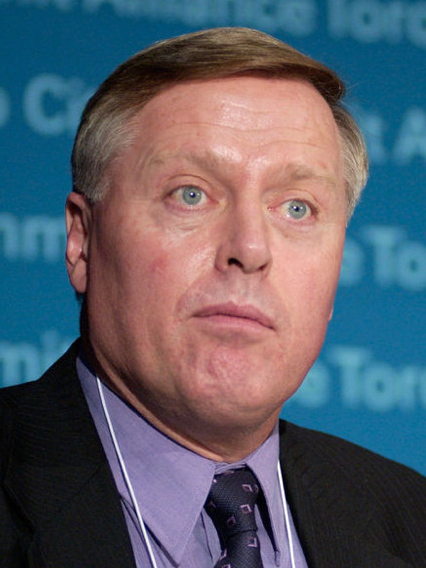

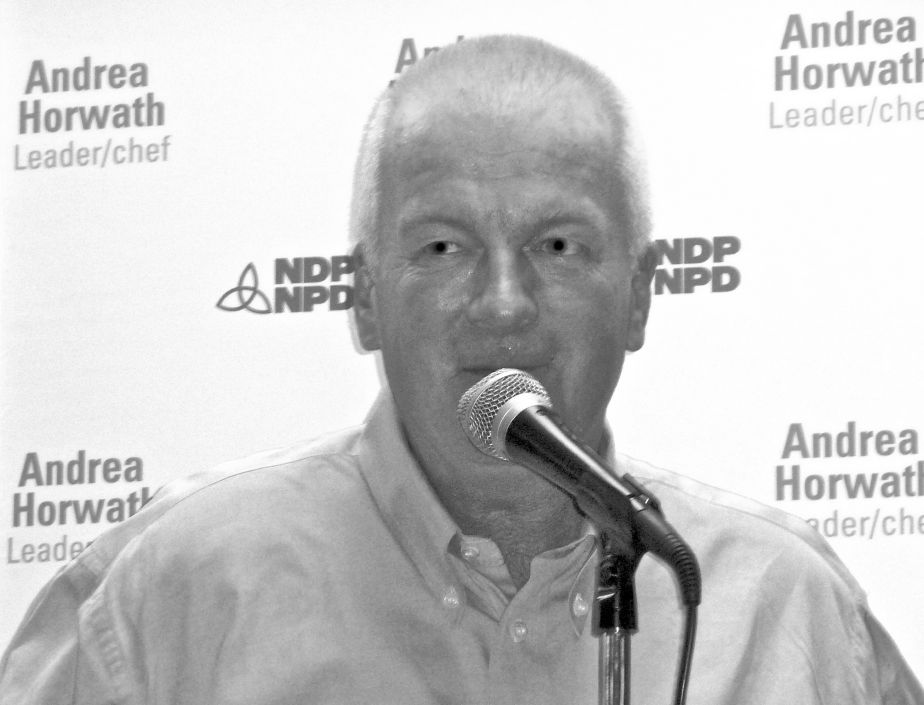
Candidate	Howard Hampton	Frances Lankin
Riding	Rainy River	Beaches—Woodbine
Final ballot	971 (55.05%)	793 (44.95%)
First ballot	649 (33.70%)	611 (31.72%)
Candidate	Peter Kormos	Tony Silipo
Riding	Welland–Thorold	Dovercourt
Final ballot	Eliminated	Eliminated
First ballot	434 (22.53%)	232 (12.05%)
Leader before election
Bob Rae
Elected Leader
Howard Hampton

1996 Ontario New Democratic Party leadership election
- Date: June 22, 1996
- Convention: Copps Coliseum, Hamilton, Ontario
- Resigning leader: Bob Rae
- Won by: Howard Hampton
- Ballots: 3
- Candidates: 4

The 1996 Ontario New Democratic Party leadership election was held in Hamilton, Ontario, on June 22, 1996 to elect a successor to Bob Rae as leader of the Ontario New Democratic Party (NDP). The convention was necessary because Rae resigned on February 29, 1996. Frances Lankin was an early favourite but was hurt due to her close association with the Rae government. Hampton, an outsider, led on the first ballot and won the leadership by 178 votes over Lankin on the third ballot. He remained as leader of the party until 2009.

== Background ==
In 1996 the party was in disarray after losing the 1995 election in which they lost 57 seats. The leader Bob Rae stayed on for another eight months but resigned his seat and his leadership on February 29, 1996 to return to private life.

Frances Lankin announced her candidacy on February 9, 1996. She was viewed as a frontrunner candidate having the support of such party luminaries as former leader Stephen Lewis. However her association with the Rae government as a senior cabinet minister and her support of the social contract, an austerity program based on unpaid leave for civil service workers, cost her support amongst the delegates.

Howard Hampton also put his name forward. While he was also a senior member of the Rae cabinet, he was viewed as more of an outsider, particularly because he was from northern Ontario and not based in Toronto.

Tony Silipo and Peter Kormos also entered the race. Both were longshot candidates. Silipo's campaign emphasized involvement of multicultural communities. Kormos had gained special notoriety as a maverick. Kormos was an informal leader of the left wing of the party, and a vocal opponent of the Social Contract. He had been kicked out of cabinet in 1991 after appearing as the Sunshine Boy in the right-wing Toronto Sun, and managed to get himself expelled from the legislature ten days before the convention during a debate on an education reform bill.

Union support for the candidates was mixed. The Steelworkers were divided between Lankin and Hampton while the Autoworkers were split between Lankin and Kormos. Kormos concentrated his attacks on Lankin, from the left. This weakened her initial support and when the first ballot was counted she trailed Hampton. Even though Kormos was a long shot, he managed to get more than 1/5 of the total delegate support.

After the first ballot Silipo was eliminated and he endorsed Hampton. After the second ballot, Kormos was eliminated and he endorsed no one. On the final ballot, Hampton beat Lankin by 178 votes. 80 ballots were spoiled, likely from disgruntled Kormos supporters.

== Candidates ==
=== Howard Hampton ===
Howard Hampton was the Member of Provincial Parliament (MPP) for Rainy River. He was first elected in the 1987 provincial election. Before entering politics, he was a lawyer.

Endorsements

- Former party leader: (1) Donald C. MacDonald (1953–1970)
- MPPs: (1) Shelley Martel (Sudbury East)

=== Peter Kormos ===
Peter Kormos was the Member of Provincial Parliament (MPP) for Welland–Thorold. He was first elected in the 1988 by-election for Welland–Thorold. Previously, he was a member of Welland City Council. Before entering politics, he was a lawyer.

=== Frances Lankin ===
Frances Lankin was the Member of Provincial Parliament (MPP) for Beaches—Woodbine. She was first elected in the 1990 provincial election. Before entering politics, she was a union negotiator for OPSEU.

Endorsements

- Former party leader: (1) Stephen Lewis (1970–1978)

=== Tony Silipo ===
Tony Silipo was the Member of Provincial Parliament (MPP) for Dovercourt. He was first elected in the 1990 provincial election. Previously, he was a trustee on the Toronto Board of Education from 1978 to 1990. Before entering politics, he was a lawyer.

== Ballot results ==
= Eliminated from next round
= Released delegates
= Winner

Delegate support by ballot
Candidate	1st Ballot		2nd Ballot			3rd Ballot		
Name	Votes	%	Votes	%	+/− (pp)	Votes	%	+/− (pp)
Howard Hampton	649	33.7	806	42.4	+8.7	971	55.0	+12.6
Frances Lankin	611	31.7	691	36.4	+4.7	793	45.0	+8.6
Peter Kormos	434	22.5	402	21.2	-1.3	Released delegates		
Tony Silipo	232	12.0	Eliminated (endorsed Hampton)					
Total	1,926	100.0	1,899	100.0	-27	1,764	100.0	-135
