= Longhurst =

Longhurst is a surname. Notable people with the surname include:

- Alan Longhurst (1925–2023), British-born Canadian oceanographer
- Albert Henry Longhurst (1876–1955), Indianologist and archaeologist, Archaeological Commissioner of Ceylon
- Cyril Longhurst (1878–1948), ASI
- David Longhurst (1965–1990), English footballer
- Eva Longhurst, one of Ontario Provincial Confederation of Regions Party candidates, 1990 Ontario provincial election
- Garry Longhurst
- Henry Longhurst (1909–1978), renowned British golf writer and commentator
- Henry Longhurst (actor) (1891–1970), British actor
- Jane Longhurst, British school teacher murdered by Graham Coutts in 2003
- John Longhurst (born 1940), organist for the Mormon Tabernacle Choir for 30 years
- Kate Longhurst, English footballer
- Katharine A Longhurst, English football manager
- Mark Longhurst, UK television newsreader and journalist
- Martha Longhurst, UK TV Coronation Street character
- Neil Longhurst (born 1984), English cricketer
- Robert Longhurst (born 1949), American sculptor from Schenectady, New York
- Robyn Longhurst, New Zealand professor of human geography
- Sue Longhurst, English actress, most famous for appearing in several X-rated comedies in the 1970s
- Tony Longhurst (born 1957), Australian former racing driver and Australian Champion water skier
- William Henry Longhurst (1819–1904), English organist at Canterbury Cathedral

== See also ==
- Longhurst Plateau, narrow, snow-covered extension of the Antarctic polar plateau located just west of Mount Longhurst
- Hollinghurst
- Longphuirt
- Longhurst code, a set of codes used to represent biogeochemical provinces in oceanographic research
- Longhirst
