= List of mayors of Welland =

This is a list of mayors of Welland, Ontario, from its incorporation in 1858 to the present day.

To date, three former mayors of the city have gone on to represent the city at the provincial or federal levels. Marshall Vaughan and Cindy Forster have represented the city as MPPs in the Legislative Assembly of Ontario, and Allan Pietz has represented the city as an MP in the House of Commons of Canada.

== City of Welland (1917-present) ==
Welland was reincorporated as a city in 1917.

1. Marshall Vaughan, 1917–18
2. A.J.J. Brennan, 1919
3. George Sutherland, 1920
4. J.C. Diffin, 1921
5. Jas Hughes, 1922–24
6. F.J. Anderson, 1925–28
7. F.M. Brown, 1929–30
8. F.J. Bradley, 1931–32
9. Frank Springer, 1933–35
10. Norman Michener, 1936–37
11. John Joyce, 1938–39
12. T.H. Lewis, 1940–45
13. H.W. Walker, 1946–47
14. Harry W. Diffin, 1948–50
15. David Thomas, 1951–52
16. Armour McCrae, 1953–58
17. G.J. Macoomb, 1958–60
18. Michael Perenack, 1961–64
19. Allan Pietz, 1965–78
20. Eugene Stranges, 1979–84
21. Roland Hardy, 1985–91
22. Dick Reuter, 1991–2000
23. Cindy Forster, 2000–03
24. Damian Goulborne, 2003–10
25. Barry Sharpe, 2010–14
26. Frank Campion, 2014–2026
27. Pat Chiocchio 2026-Present
