= James Currie (politician) =

Canadian politician

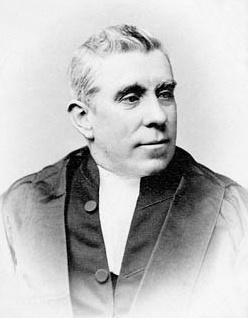

Member of the Legislative Assembly of Ontario for Welland
- In office March 21, 1871 – April 25, 1879
- Preceded by: William Beatty
- Succeeded by: Daniel Near

Personal details
- Born: November 24, 1827 Toronto, Canada West
- Died: December 8, 1901 (aged 74) Ontario, Canada
- Party: Liberal
- Portfolio: Speaker of the Legislative Assembly of Ontario (December 21, 1871 – March 29, 1873)

James George Currie (November 24, 1827 – December 8, 1901) was speaker of the Legislature of Ontario from December 21, 1871, to March 29, 1873, and served as Liberal MLA for Welland from 1871 to 1879. His standing committee service included those for Private Bills, Railways, Privileges and Elections, and Standing Orders.

Currie was born in Toronto in 1827. He studied law and was called to the bar in 1853. He was county warden and mayor of St. Catharines from 1859 to 1863. In 1862, he was elected to the Legislative Council of the Province of Canada representing Niagara district in a by-election after the death of William Hamilton Merritt. He was a member of the Liberal Party of Ontario. Currie also served as Lieutenant-Colonel in the local militia. Currie ran unsuccessfully for the Niagara seat in the Ontario assembly in 1867. He served as St. Catharines mayor again from 1869 to 1870. He was elected to the provincial assembly in 1871 and became speaker in December of that year after Richard William Scott was named to cabinet. He resigned as speaker on March 29, 1873. In November 1873, he was named an agent at St. Catharines for the Canadian Department of Justice.

In 1877 and 1878, it was reported that he had misappropriated funds from his clients. Currie was defeated when he ran for reelection in 1879.

He died December 8, 1901.

== Electoral history ==
1871 Ontario general election: Welland
Party	Candidate	Votes	%	±%
Liberal	James Currie	1,182	53.12	−1.10
Liberal	William Beatty	1,043	46.88	−7.34
Turnout		2,225	61.08	−7.44
Eligible voters		3,643		
Liberal hold		Swing		+3.12
Source: Elections Ontario

1875 Ontario general election: Welland
Party	Candidate	Votes	%	±%
Liberal	James Currie	1,719	51.16	−48.84
Conservative	W. Buchner	1,641	48.84	
Total valid votes		3,360	69.48	+8.40
Eligible voters		4,836		
Election voided
Source: Elections Ontario

Ontario provincial by-election, July 1875: Welland Previous election voided
Party	Candidate	Votes	%	±%
Liberal	James Currie	1,747	52.51	−47.49
Conservative	W. Buchnar	1,580	47.49	
Total valid votes		3,327		
Liberal hold		Swing		−47.49
Source: History of the Electoral Districts, Legislatures and Ministries of the Province of Ontario
