= Tony Silipo =

Canadian politician (1957–2012)

Ontario MPP
- In office 1990–1999
- Preceded by: Tony Lupusella
- Succeeded by: Riding abolished
- Constituency: Dovercourt

Personal details
- Born: August 10, 1957 Martone, Calabria, Italy
- Died: March 10, 2012 (aged 54) Toronto, Ontario
- Party: New Democratic Party
- Spouse: Anne Marie Miraglia
- Children: 1
- Occupation: Lawyer

Tony Silipo (August 10, 1957 – March 10, 2012) was a Canadian politician. He served in the Legislative Assembly of Ontario from 1990 to 1999 representing the New Democratic Party in the downtown Toronto riding of Dovercourt. In 1999 he was appointed to the Workplace Safety and Insurance appeals tribunal. He died in 2012 from a brain cancer.

== Background ==
Silipo attended Bloor Collegiate Institute in Toronto, and was educated at the University of Toronto and Osgoode Hall at York University, and began practising law in 1984. He also served as a trustee on the Toronto Board of Education from 1978 to 1990, and was its chair from 1989 to 1990.

== Politics ==
Silipo was elected to the Legislative Assembly of Ontario in the 1990 provincial election as the New Democratic Party Member of Provincial Parliament (MPP) for the Toronto riding of Dovercourt. He joined the Bob Rae cabinet as Chair of the Management Board from July 31, 1991 to September 23, 1992, Minister of Education from October 15, 1991 to February 3, 1993 and Minister of Community and Social Services from February 3, 1993 to June 26, 1995.

As Education Minister, one of Silipo's first decisions was to restore national indicator achievement tests, which had previously been removed by his predecessor, Marion Boyd. He was also an active promoter of "de-streaming" in an effort to stop the practice of "streaming" children of immigrant and working-class families into non-academic courses of study.

Although Silipo supported the Rae government's austerity Social Contract legislation in 1993, he was generally regarded as one of the more left-leaning figures in the cabinet. In 1991, he was the only member of Rae's inner cabinet to recommend that the government introduce public automobile insurance to the province. In 1994, he spoke in cabinet against cuts to social assistance and the introduction of user fees for certain prescription drugs.

Silipo retained his seat in the 1995 election that defeated the Rae government. He ran for the leadership of the NDP in 1996, but was unable to build a strong support base and finished fourth behind Howard Hampton, Frances Lankin and Peter Kormos. Following the contest, Silipo was appointed deputy leader of the party.

In 1997, when the provincial government was passing a bill that would amalgamate the city of Toronto with surrounding municipalities, the NDP attempted to block the bill by filibuster. Silipo introduced a list of 11,000 amendments, to be debated and voted on one at a time (many of the specific amendments were read by other party members), which held up the bill for a week and a half.

In 1999, a reduction in ridings in Ontario resulted in the elimination of the Dovercourt riding. Silipo contested the new riding of Davenport in the 1999 election against Liberal Tony Ruprecht. He lost by nearly 5,000 votes.

=== Cabinet positions ===
Rae ministry, Province of Ontario (1990–1995)
Cabinet posts (3)
Predecessor	Office	Successor
Marion Boyd	Minister of Community and Social Services; 1993–1995	David Tsubouchi
Marion Boyd	Minister of Education; 1991–1993	Dave Cooke
Frances Lankin	Chair of the Management Board; 1991–1992	Dave Cooke

== Later life ==
He was appointed to the Workplace Safety and Insurance appeals tribunal by Labour Minister Chris Stockwell in 1999. In 2003, he became president of the newly formed Federation of Calabrese in Ontario. He died in 2012 after being diagnosed with a brain tumour. He was 54.
