= Edward Anderson (Canadian politician) =

Canadian politician from Ontario

Member of the Ontario Provincial Parliament for Welland
- In office June 19, 1934 – June 30, 1943
- Preceded by: Marshall Vaughan
- Succeeded by: Howard Elis Brown

Personal details
- Born: Edward James Anderson
- Party: Liberal

Edward James Anderson was a Canadian politician who was Liberal MPP for Welland from 1934 to 1943.

== See also ==
- 19th Parliament of Ontario
- 20th Parliament of Ontario
