= Thomas Henry Lewis =

Canadian politician from Ontario

Member of the Ontario Provincial Parliament for Welland
- In office June 4, 1945 – April 27, 1948
- Preceded by: Howard Elis Brown
- Succeeded by: Harold William Walker

Personal details
- Party: Progressive Conservative

Thomas Henry Lewis was a Canadian politician who was Progressive Conservative MPP for Welland from 1945 to 1948.

== See also ==
- 22nd Parliament of Ontario
