= Dave Cooke =

Canadian politician

The Honourable Dave Cooke ECO
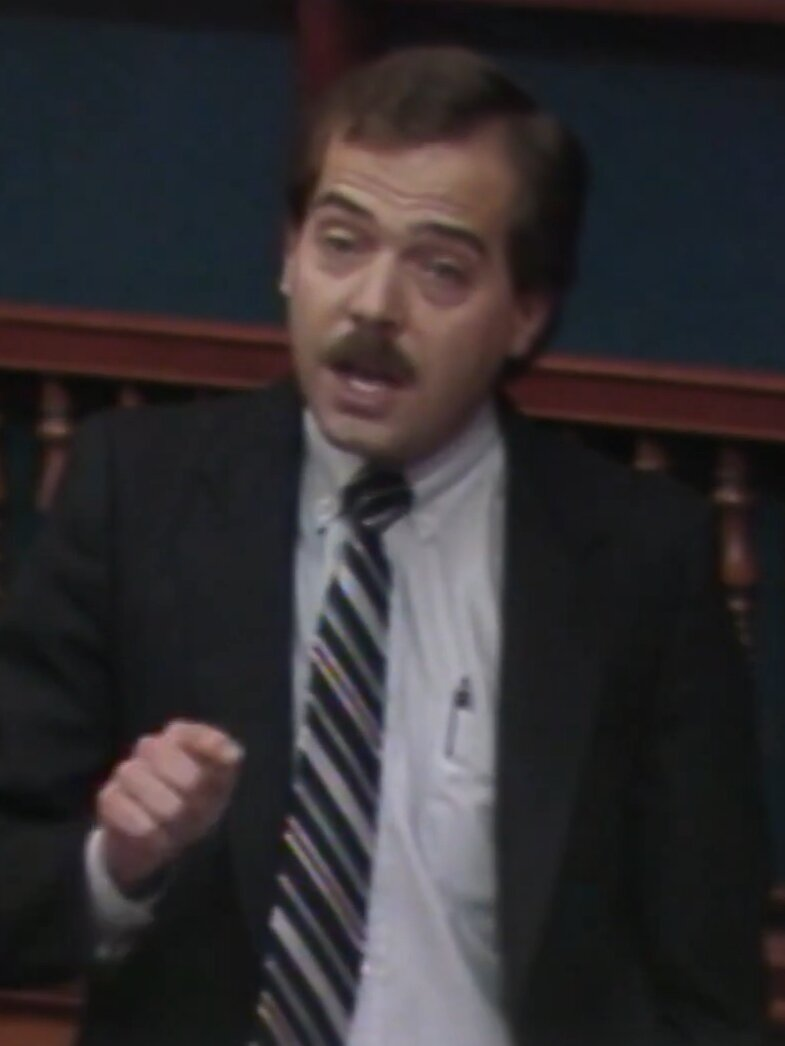
- Cooke in 1986

Ontario MPP
- In office 1977–1997
- Preceded by: Fred Burr
- Succeeded by: Wayne Lessard
- Constituency: Windsor—Riverside

Personal details
- Born: August 1, 1952 (age 73) Windsor, Ontario, Canada
- Party: New Democrat
- Occupation: Social worker

Dave Cooke (born August 1, 1952) is a former politician in Ontario, Canada. He was an NDP member of the provincial legislature from 1977 to 1997, and was a senior cabinet minister in the government of Bob Rae.

== Background ==
Cooke was born in Windsor, Ontario, the son of Sid and Betty Cooke. He attended the University of Windsor and graduated with a degree in social work. He worked as a social worker at the Essex Children's Aid Society in Windsor. He served on the Windsor Planning Board in 1974 and was a member of the Windsor Board of Education from 1975 to 1976.

== Politics ==
He was elected to the Ontario legislature in the general election of 1977, defeating Liberal Michael MacDougall by over 2,000 votes in the riding of Windsor—Riverside. He was re-elected by greater margins in the elections of 1981, 1985, 1987 and 1990. Cooke defeated future Liberal MP Rick Limoges by almost 6,000 votes in 1987.

Unlike most other members of the NDP caucus, Cooke was supportive of Bob Rae's leadership throughout the 1980s. As early as 1981, he had petitioned Rae to run for the leadership of the provincial party. He became the party's whip in 1985 and acted as the health critic. In 1987, he was appointed as the party's House leader, and became pensions critic.

=== In government ===
The NDP won a majority government in the 1990 election. Cooke, as one of the party's most senior MPPs, was appointed Minister of Housing and Municipal Affairs on October 1, 1990. On July 31, 1991, he was appointed Government House Leader and he moved to the Ministry of Municipal Affairs. Cooke also served as Chair of the Management Board of Cabinet from September 23, 1992 to February 3, 1993.

As Minister of Housing and Municipal Affairs, Cooke announced that the government would restrict most rent increases to 4.6% for the present year and 5.4% for 1991. The provisions for 1990 were made retroactive. Tenants' groups supported these changes, while landlord representatives were generally opposed. A few days after the policy announcement, a landlord group placed a $25,000 advertisement in The Wall Street Journal suggesting that investors avoid Ontario. Their ploy was widely criticized. Cooke later announced that he would work to factor in the costs of legitimate building renovations.

On February 3, 1993, Cooke was promoted to the high-profile position of Minister of Education, which he retained for the remainder of the Rae government's time in office.

Cooke endorsed the Rae government's establishment of a casino in Windsor as a means of stimulating the city's economy during the recession of the early 1990s. He also strongly opposed cuts to welfare recipients. As education minister, he maintained support for "de-streaming" (which had been endorsed by Tony Silipo, his predecessor) and endorsed and implemented province-wide testing.

=== Cabinet positions ===
Rae ministry, Province of Ontario (1990–1995)
Cabinet posts (3)
Predecessor	Office	Successor
Tony Silipo	Minister of Education and Training; 1993–1995	John Snobelen
Tony Silipo	Chair of the Management Board of Cabinet; 1992–1993	Brian Charlton
John Sweeney	Minister of Municipal Affairs and Housing (Note: Ministry split July 31, 1991. After this date Cooke was just Minister of Municipal Affairs. Evelyn Gigantes was appointed as Minister of Housing.); 1990–1993	Ed Philip
Special Parliamentary Responsibilities
Predecessor	Title	Successor
Shelley Martel	Government House Leader; 1991–1995	Ernie Eves

=== Opposition and resignation ===
The NDP lost the 1995 provincial election, although Cooke was re-elected in Windsor—Riverside with a reduced majority. He continued to serve as NDP house leader from 1995 to 1996. In 1996, he endorsed Frances Lankin's unsuccessful bid to replace Rae as party leader.

Cooke resigned from the legislature in January 1997, after being appointed to an "Education Improvement Commission" established by the Progressive Conservative government of Mike Harris, later chairing the commission.

== After politics ==
He was a regular member of TVOntario's Studio 2 political discussion panel. He was head of the board of governors at the University of Windsor until 2009.

In 2008, he was appointed by Windsor mayor Eddie Francis to chair a committee to examine the feasibility of a marina-canal plan in the city's downtown area. The concept was eventually rejected by city council as too expensive.

In February, 2015, Cooke was named Chair of Ontario's Education Quality and Accountability Office. He became a member of the EQAO Board of Directors in 2008.

In November 2, 2022, Cooke came out as gay on TVO.
