= Howard Elis Brown =

Canadian politician

Ontario MPP
- In office August 4, 1943 – March 24, 1945
- Preceded by: Edward James Anderson
- Succeeded by: Thomas Henry Lewis
- Constituency: Welland

Personal details
- Born: December 24, 1902 Birnam, Ontario, Canada
- Died: October 23, 1992 (aged 89) Dunnville, Ontario, Canada
- Party: Co-operative Commonwealth Federation
- Occupation: Merchant

Howard Elis Brown (December 24, 1902 – October 12, 1992) was a Canadian merchant and politician from Ontario. He represented the provincial riding of Welland as a Co-operative Commonwealth Federation (Ontario Section) member of the Legislative Assembly of Ontario from 1943 to 1945. He unsuccessfully contested the federal riding of Haldimand as a Co-operative Commonwealth Federation candidate in the 1949 federal election.

He died at Haldimand War Memorial Hospital in Dunnville, aged 90, after a seven-year illness.
