= John Richard Simonett =

Canadian politician (1911–1983)

Jack Simonett

Ontario MPP
- In office 1959–1971
- Preceded by: David John Rankin
- Succeeded by: Wilmer John Nuttall
- Constituency: Frontenac—Addington

Personal details
- Born: September 2, 1911 Harrowsmith, Ontario
- Died: January 17, 1983 (aged 71) Kingston, Ontario
- Party: Progressive Conservative
- Occupation: Automobile dealer
- Portfolio: Minister without portfolio, 1962-1963

John Richard Simonett (September 2, 1911 – January 17, 1983) was a politician in Ontario, Canada. He was a Progressive Conservative member of the Legislative Assembly of Ontario from 1959 to 1971 who represented the riding Frontenac—Addington.

== Background ==
Simonett was born in Frontenac County, Ontario to William Harry Simonett and Caroline Barr. He ran an automobile dealership in Sharbot Lake. He died January 17, 1983.

== Politics ==
Simonett served for several years on the council of Oso Township and was reeve for six years.

In the 1959 provincial election, Simonett ran as the PC candidate in the eastern Ontario riding of Frontenac—Addington. He defeated Liberal Armand Quintal by 2,238 votes. He was re-elected in the general elections in 1963 and 1967.

On October 25, 1962, he was appointed as Minister without Portfolio. After the 1963 election, Simonett was appointed as the Minister of Energy Resources. He continued in that position, after the 1967 election, until October 5, 1969, at which time he was appointed as the Minister of Public Works. In 1971, he supported Bill Davis in his bid to become leader of the party. On March 11, 1971, he was appointed to a newly created post of vice chairman of the Ontario Northland Transportation Commission, a move that was criticized as a reward for supporting Davis in the leadership campaign. Simonett announced his retirement from politics in 1971.

=== Cabinet positions ===
Robarts ministry, Province of Ontario (1961–1971)
Cabinet posts (2)
Predecessor	Office	Successor
Ray Connell	Minister of Public Works; 1969-1971	James Auld
Robert Macaulay	Minister of Energy and Resources Management; 1963-1969; Was styled "Minister of Energy Resources" from 1963-1964	George Kerr
