= William Beatty (Ontario politician) =

Canadian businessman and politician

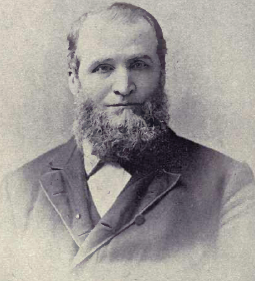

Ontario MPP
- In office 1867–1871
- Succeeded by: James Currie
- Constituency: Welland

Personal details
- Born: January 19, 1835 Stonyford, Ireland
- Died: December 2, 1898 (aged 63) Parry Sound, Ontario, Canada
- Party: Liberal
- Profession: Businessman

William Beatty (January 19, 1835 – December 2, 1898) was an Ontario businessman and political figure.

He was born in Stonyford, Ireland in 1835 and came to Thorold in Upper Canada with his family the same year. He attended Victoria College in Cobourg, receiving an LLB in 1864. He was elected to the university's senate in the following year. He also worked with his father and brother in the timber trade. Their company operated a sawmill on the Seguin River at Parry Sound, primarily managed by William, and a steamship service between Collingwood, Parry Sound and Port Arthur/Fort William (Thunder Bay), mainly operated by his brother James Hughes. The firm set up a town at Parry Sound and William also served as a lay Methodist minister for the community.

In 1867, he was unsuccessful in a bid to represent Algoma in the House of Commons of Canada, losing by 9 votes; he was elected to represent Welland in the Legislative Assembly of Ontario later that same year. He was not reelected in the next general election in 1871. Later that year, the operation in Parry Sound was sold and Beatty settled there. He bought out his brother and father's share in the town site and set up a general store there. With Beatty's support, a vote was taken to keep the township free of alcohol under the terms of the Dunkin Act. Up until 1950, anyone who bought land in the town had to sign an agreement not to sell alcohol on their premises.

Over the years, Beatty operated a number of mills at Parry Sound. He also retained a share in the shipping operation. He operated a hotel located on the waterfront and helped establish a railway line to Parry Sound, which was later taken over by John Rudolphus Booth's Ottawa, Arnprior & Parry Sound Railway.

He died at Parry Sound in 1898.

== Electoral record ==
=== Federal ===
1867 Canadian federal election: Algoma
Party	Candidate	Votes	%
Conservative	Wemyss Mackenzie Simpson	250	47.26
Unknown	William Beatty	241	45.56
Unknown	A. MacDonell	38	7.18
Eligible voters		862	
Source: Canadian Parliamentary Guide, 1871

=== Provincial ===
1867 Ontario general election: Welland
Party	Candidate	Votes	%
Liberal	William Beatty	1,298	54.22
Conservative	E.A. Pew	1,096	45.78
Total valid votes		2,394	68.52
Eligible voters		3,494	
Liberal pickup new district.			
Source: Elections Ontario

1871 Ontario general election: Welland
Party	Candidate	Votes	%	±%
Liberal	James Currie	1,182	53.12	−1.10
Liberal	William Beatty	1,043	46.88	−7.34
Turnout		2,225	61.08	−7.44
Eligible voters		3,643		
Liberal hold		Swing		+3.12
Source: Elections Ontario
