= J. Earl McEwen =

Canadian politician (1911–2004)

Ontario MPP
- In office 1975–1985
- Preceded by: Wilmer John Nuttall
- Succeeded by: Larry South
- Constituency: Frontenac—Addington

Personal details
- Born: January 22, 1911 Sharbot Lake, Ontario
- Died: November 6, 2004 (aged 93) Sharbot Lake, Ontario
- Party: Liberal, 1975-1984; Progressive Conservative, 1984-1985

Joseph Earl McEwen (January 22, 1911 – November 6, 2004) was a politician in Ontario, Canada. He served in the Legislative Assembly of Ontario from 1975 to 1985.

== Background ==
McEwen was born at Sharbot Lake, Ontario, and educated in Trenton. He was an active freemason. He owned a grocery store and decided to enter politics after the municipal government of Kingston denied him permission to salt the street in front of his business. He served as reeve of the community for sixteen years, and was warden of Frontenac County as well as president of the local Progressive Conservative association.

== Politics ==
He ran for the House of Commons of Canada in the federal elections of 1963 and 1965, as a candidate of the Progressive Conservative Party of Canada in Kingston. He lost on both occasions to Liberal candidate Edgar Benson.

McEwen first campaigned for the Ontario legislature in the 1971 provincial election. After losing the Progressive Conservative nomination in Frontenac—Addington to W.J. Nuttall, he entered the contest as an independent candidate and finished a credible third. McEwen subsequently joined the Ontario Liberal Party, and defeated Nuttall by 1,415 votes under his new party's banner in the 1975 election.

He was re-elected by 940 votes in the 1977 election, and by 340 votes in the 1981 election. He crossed the floor to join the Progressive Conservative Party in 1984, complaining that the Liberal Party was going nowhere under David Peterson's leadership. McEwen had been known in the Liberal caucus as a difficult figure, and rarely attended meetings. Some believe he wanted to ensure his own re-election by changing sides. The Progressive Conservatives had planned to nominate Sally Barnes, a prominent aide to Premier William Davis, to challenge him in the next election.

Despite languishing in the polls throughout 1984, the Liberals made significant gains in the 1985 provincial election and formed a minority government with outside support from the New Democratic Party. McEwen lost the Frontenac—Addington constituency to Liberal candidate Larry South by 2,387 votes.

== Later life ==
McEwen died in 2004 at age 93, and the legislature paid tribute to him on December 14 of that year. He was predeceased by his wife and his son Robert and is survived by three granddaughters and seven great-grandchildren. Bob Runciman described him as a larger-than-life figure in the political culture of eastern Ontario. During his career as a politician, McEwen was known for touring his constituency in a two-door Lincoln, wearing a wide-brimmed hat and smoking a prominent cigar. He often complained that little real work was done in the assembly, and said that he preferred to spend time in his community. There is currently a J. Earl McEwen Fire Hall in Kingston, and another building was named in his honour in 2005.
