= Harold William Walker =

Canadian politician

Member of the Ontario Provincial Parliament for Welland
- In office June 7, 1948 – October 6, 1951
- Preceded by: Thomas Henry Lewis
- Succeeded by: Ellis Morningstar

Personal details
- Party: Liberal

Harold William Walker was a Canadian politician who was Liberal MPP for Welland from 1948 to 1951.

== See also ==
- 23rd Parliament of Ontario
