= Wilmer John Nuttall =

Canadian politician (1920–2003)

Ontario MPP
- In office 1971–1975
- Preceded by: John Richard Simonett
- Succeeded by: Joseph Earl McEwen
- Constituency: Frontenac—Addington

Personal details
- Born: January 20, 1920
- Died: June 27, 2003 (aged 83)
- Party: Progressive Conservative
- Spouse: Annie E. Lloyd
- Children: 7

Wilmer John Nuttall (January 20, 1920 – June 27, 2003) was a Canadian politician, who represented Frontenac—Addington in the Legislative Assembly of Ontario from 1971 to 1975 as a Progressive Conservative member. He won the Progressive Conservative nomination when the long-standing MPP, and former Minister, John Simonett decided to retire from politics.

Wilmer was married twice, first to Annie E. Lloyd, with whom he had five children, and he had two additional children with his second wife.
