= David John Rankin =

Canadian politician

Ontario MPP
- In office 1955–1959
- Preceded by: New riding
- Succeeded by: John Richard Simonett
- Constituency: Frontenac—Addington

Personal details
- Born: June 20, 1903 Collins Bay, Ontario
- Died: November 17, 1959 (aged 56) Kingston, Ontario
- Party: Progressive Conservative
- Occupation: Lawyer

David John Rankin (June 20, 1903 – November 17, 1959) was a Scottish-Canadian politician who was a Member of Provincial Parliament in Legislative Assembly of Ontario from 1955 to 1959. He represented the riding of Frontenac—Addington for the Ontario Progressive Conservative Party. He was born in Collins Bay, Ontario and was a lawyer. He died at a hospital in Kingston, Ontario in 1959 and was buried at Cataraqui Cemetery.
