= Niagara Centre (provincial electoral district) =

Provincial electoral district in Ontario, Canada

Coordinates: 43.009°N 79.280°W

Ontario electoral district
- Niagara Centre in relation to southern Ontario ridings

Provincial electoral district
- Legislature: Legislative Assembly of Ontario
MPP
Jeff Burch
New Democratic
- District created: 2006
- First contested: 2007
- Last contested: 2025

Demographics
- Population (2016): 109,070
- Electors (2018): 88,287
- Area (km²): 490
- Pop. density (per km²): 222.6
- Census division: Niagara
- Census subdivision(s): Welland, Thorold, Port Colborne, St. Catharines

Niagara Centre (renamed to Welland from 2006 to 2018) is a provincial electoral district in Ontario, Canada, represented from 1867 until 1977 and again since 2007 (under different boundaries) in the Legislative Assembly of Ontario. Its population in 2006 was 112,875.

A new riding of Niagara Centre was created before the 1999 election from small parts of the Lincoln and St. Catharines—Brock ridings, and almost all of the Welland—Thorold riding. The current electoral district was created in 2003: 74.9% of the riding came from Niagara Centre riding, 22.5% from Erie—Lincoln and 2.7% from Niagara Falls riding. The name was changed to Welland during redistricting in 2006. In 2018, the name was changed back to Niagara Centre.

== Geography ==
From 1967 to 1975, the southern part of the riding was covered by the Welland South district.

The pre-2018 Welland riding consisted of the cities of Welland, Thorold, Port Colborne, and the part of the City of St. Catharines lying south of a line drawn from the western city limit east along St. Paul Street West, northeast along St. Paul Crescent, east and south along Twelve Mile Creek, and east along Glendale Avenue to the eastern city limit.

== Members of Provincial Parliament ==
| Assembly | Years | Member | Party |
|---|---|---|---|
Welland
| 1st | 1867–1871 | William Beatty | Liberal |
| 2nd | 1871–1874 | James Currie | Liberal |
| 3rd | 1875–1879 | James Currie | Liberal |
| 4th | 1879–1883 | Daniel Near | Liberal |
| 5th | 1883–1886 | James E. Morin | Liberal |
| 6th | 1886–1890 | James E. Morin | Liberal |
| 7th | 1890–1894 | William McCleary | Conservative |
| 8th | 1894–1898 | William Manley German | Liberal |
| 9th | 1898–1900 | William Manley German | Liberal |
| 9th | 1900–1902 | John Franklin Gross | Liberal |
| 10th | 1902–1904 | John Franklin Gross | Liberal |
| 11th | 1905–1908 | Evan Eugene Fraser | Conservative |
| 12th | 1908–1911 | Evan Eugene Fraser | Conservative |
| 13th | 1911–1914 | Evan Eugene Fraser | Conservative |
| 14th | 1914–1919 | Donald Sharpe | Conservative |
| 15th | 1919–1923 | Robert Cooper | Liberal |
| 16th | 1923–1926 | Marshall Vaughan | Conservative |
| 17th | 1926–1929 | Marshall Vaughan | Conservative |
| 18th | 1929–1934 | Marshall Vaughan | Conservative |
| 19th | 1934–1937 | Edward James Anderson | Liberal |
| 20th | 1937–1943 | Edward James Anderson | Liberal |
| 21st | 1943–1945 | Howard Elis Brown | Co-operative Commonwealth |
| 22nd | 1945–1948 | Thomas Henry Lewis | Progressive Conservative |
| 23rd | 1948–1951 | Harold William Walker | Liberal |
| 24th | 1951–1955 | Ellis Morningstar | Progressive Conservative |
| 25th | 1955–1959 | Ellis Morningstar | Progressive Conservative |
| 26th | 1959–1963 | Ellis Morningstar | Progressive Conservative |
| 27th | 1963–1967 | Ellis Morningstar | Progressive Conservative |
| 28th | 1967–1971 | Ellis Morningstar | Progressive Conservative |
| 29th | 1971–1975 | Ellis Morningstar | Progressive Conservative |
| 30th | 1975–1977 | Mel Swart | New Democratic |
Welland—Thorold
| 31st | 1977–1981 | Mel Swart | New Democratic |
| 32nd | 1981–1985 | Mel Swart | New Democratic |
| 33rd | 1985–1987 | Mel Swart | New Democratic |
| 34th | 1987–1988 | Mel Swart | New Democratic |
| 34th | 1988–1990 | Peter Kormos | New Democratic |
| 35th | 1990–1995 | Peter Kormos | New Democratic |
| 36th | 1995–1999 | Peter Kormos | New Democratic |
Niagara Centre; Created from Welland—Thorold, Lincoln and St. Catharines—Brock
| 37th | 1999–2003 | Peter Kormos | New Democratic |
| 38th | 2003–2007 | Peter Kormos | New Democratic |
Welland
| 39th | 2007–2011 | Peter Kormos | New Democratic |
| 40th | 2011–2014 | Cindy Forster | New Democratic |
| 41st | 2014–2018 | Cindy Forster | New Democratic |
Niagara Centre
| 42nd | 2018–2022 | Jeff Burch | New Democratic |
| 43rd | 2022–2025 | Jeff Burch | New Democratic |
| 44th | 2025–present | Jeff Burch | New Democratic |

Source: Legislative Assembly of Ontario

== Election results ==
=== Niagara Centre, 2018– ===
Winning party in each polling division of Niagara Centre at the 2025 Ontario general election

2025 Ontario general election
| Party | Candidate | Votes | % | ±% | Expenditures |
|---|---|---|---|---|---|
| New Democratic | Jeff Burch | 20,408 | 42.29 | +2.59 | $92,494 |
| Progressive Conservative | Bill Steele | 18,073 | 37.27 | –0.36 | $92,858 |
| Liberal | Damien O'Brien | 7,143 | 14.74 | +1.41 | $5,551 |
| Green | Natashia Bergen | 1,261 | 2.60 | –1.93 | $0 |
| New Blue | Jimmy Jackson | 857 | 1.77 | –0.97 | $1,667 |
| Ontario Party | Darryl Weinberg | 513 | 1.06 | –0.97 | |
| Ontario Alliance | Angela Browne | 130 | 0.27 | N/A | |
| Total valid votes/expense limit | | 48,483 | 99.28 | –0.25 | $162,196 |
| Total rejected, unmarked, and declined ballots | | 353 | 0.72 | +0.25 | |
| Turnout | | 48,836 | 49.59 | +6.22 | |
| Eligible voters | | 98,486 | | | |
| New Democratic hold | | Swing | | +1.48 | |
Source: Elections Ontario

Winning party in each polling division of Niagara Centre at the 2022 Ontario general election

2022 Ontario general election
| Party | Candidate | Votes | % | ±% | Expenditures |
|---|---|---|---|---|---|
| New Democratic | Jeff Burch | 16,360 | 39.70 | –4.53 | $98,721 |
| Progressive Conservative | Fred Davies | 15,506 | 37.63 | +0.12 | $60,037 |
| Liberal | Terry Flynn | 5,492 | 13.33 | +1.50 | $12,584 |
| Green | Michelle McArthur | 1,865 | 4.53 | +0.84 | $6 |
| New Blue | Gary Dumelie | 1,148 | 2.79 | N/A | $1,586 |
| Ontario Party | Vincent Gircys | 837 | 2.03 | N/A | $0 |
| Total valid votes/expense limit | | 41,208 | 99.53 | +0.90 | $133,643 |
| Total rejected, unmarked, and declined ballots | | 194 | 0.47 | –0.90 | |
| Turnout | | 41,402 | 43.37 | –12.76 | |
| Eligible voters | | 95,459 | | | |
| New Democratic hold | | Swing | | –2.32 | |
Source(s): "Summary of Valid Votes Cast for Each Candidate" (PDF). Elections Ontario. 2022. Archived from the original on 18 May 2023.; "Statistical Summary by Electoral District" (PDF). Elections Ontario. 2022. Archived from the original on 21 May 2023.; "Political Financing and Party Information". Elections Ontario.

2018 Ontario general election
| Party | Candidate | Votes | % | ±% | Expenditures |
|---|---|---|---|---|---|
| New Democratic | Jeff Burch | 21,618 | 44.23 | −3.65 | $45,730 |
| Progressive Conservative | April Jeffs | 18,333 | 37.51 | +10.87 | $4,614 |
| Liberal | Benoit Mercier | 5,779 | 11.82 | −8.60 | $6,184 |
| Green | Joe Dias | 1,803 | 3.69 | −0.34 | $0 |
| None of the Above | Joe Crawford | 623 | 1.27 | N/A | $0 |
| Libertarian | Patrick Pietruszko | 368 | 0.75 | −0.27 | none listed |
| Independent | Steve Soos | 217 | 0.44 | N/A | none listed |
| People's Political Party | Dario Smagata-Bryan | 133 | 0.27 | N/A | none listed |
| Total valid votes | | 48,874 | 98.63 | | |
| Total rejected, unmarked and declined ballots | | 680 | 1.37 | | |
| Turnout | | 49,554 | 56.13 | | |
| Eligible voters | | 88,287 | | | |
| New Democratic notional hold | | Swing | | –7.26 | |
Source: Elections Ontario

2014 general election redistributed results
| Party | Vote | % |
|---|---|---|
| New Democratic | 20,334 | 47.88 |
| Progressive Conservative | 11,313 | 26.64 |
| Liberal | 8,674 | 20.42 |
| Green | 1,713 | 4.03 |
| Libertarian | 435 | 1.02 |

=== Welland, 2007–2018 ===
2014 Ontario general election
| Party | Candidate | Votes | % | ±% |
|---|---|---|---|---|
| New Democratic | Cindy Forster | 21,326 | 46.79 | +2.06 |
| Progressive Conservative | Frank Campion | 12,933 | 28.37 | −3.71 |
| Liberal | Benoit Mercier | 9,060 | 19.88 | −0.01 |
| Green | Donna Cridland | 1,803 | 3.96 | +1.81 |
| Libertarian | Andrea J. Murik | 460 | 1.01 | −0.16 |
| Total valid votes | | 45,582 | 100.0 | |
| New Democratic hold | | Swing | | +2.88 |
Source: Elections Ontario

2011 Ontario general election
| Party | Candidate | Votes | % | ±% |
|---|---|---|---|---|
| New Democratic | Cindy Forster | 19,527 | 44.66 | −9.28 |
| Progressive Conservative | Domenic Ursini | 14,048 | 32.13 | +13.25 |
| Liberal | Benoit Mercier | 8,638 | 19.76 | −3.15 |
| Green | Donna Cridland | 1,005 | 2.30 | −1.94 |
| Libertarian | Donna-Lynne Hamilton | 505 | 1.15 | |
| Total valid votes | | 43,723 | 100.00 | |
| Total rejected, unmarked and declined ballots | | 248 | 0.56 | |
| Turnout | | 43,971 | 51.64 | |
| Eligible voters | | 85,141 | | |
| New Democratic hold | | Swing | | −11.27 |
Source: Elections Ontario

2007 Ontario general election
| Party | Candidate | Votes | % |
|---|---|---|---|
| New Democratic | Peter Kormos | 24,910 | 53.94 |
| Liberal | John Mastroianni | 10,580 | 22.91 |
| Progressive Conservative | Ron Bodner | 8,722 | 18.88 |
| Green | Mark Grenier | 1,973 | 4.27 |
| Total valid votes | | 46,185 | 100.0 |
| Total rejected, unmarked and declined ballots | | 347 | 0.75 |
| Turnout | | 46,532 | 55.29 |
| Eligible voters | | 84,161 | |
Source: Elections Ontario

=== Niagara Centre, 1999–2007 ===
2003 Ontario general election
| Party | Candidate | Votes | % | ±% |
|---|---|---|---|---|
| New Democratic | Peter Kormos | 23,289 | 49.64 | +5.21 |
| Liberal | Henry D'Angela | 12,526 | 26.7 | +7.31 |
| Progressive Conservative | Ann D. Gronski | 10,336 | 22.03 | −12.97 |
| Green | Jordan McArthur | 768 | 1.64 | |
Source: Elections Ontario

1999 Ontario general election
| Party | Candidate | Votes | % |
|---|---|---|---|
| New Democratic | Peter Kormos | 21,856 | 44.43 |
| Progressive Conservative | Frank Sheehan | 17,217 | 35 |
| Liberal | Maurice Charbonneau | 9,539 | 19.39 |
| Natural Law | Margaret Larrass | 382 | 0.78 |
| Independent | Lank Makuloluwa | 198 | 0.4 |
Source: Elections Ontario

=== Welland (1867–1977) ===
Ontario provincial by-election, July 1875 Previous election voided
| Party | Candidate | Votes | % | ±% |
|---|---|---|---|---|
| Liberal | James Currie | 1,747 | 52.51 | −47.49 |
| Conservative | W. Buchnar | 1,580 | 47.49 | |
| Total valid votes | | 3,327 | | |
| Liberal hold | | Swing | | −47.49 |
Source: History of the Electoral Districts, Legislatures and Ministries of the Province of Ontario

1875 Ontario general election
| Party | Candidate | Votes | % | ±% |
|---|---|---|---|---|
| Liberal | James Currie | 1,719 | 51.16 | −48.84 |
| Conservative | W. Buchner | 1,641 | 48.84 | |
| Total valid votes | | 3,360 | 69.48 | +8.40 |
| Eligible voters | | 4,836 | | |
Election voided
Source: Elections Ontario

1871 Ontario general election
| Party | Candidate | Votes | % | ±% |
|---|---|---|---|---|
| Liberal | James Currie | 1,182 | 53.12 | −1.10 |
| Liberal | William Beatty | 1,043 | 46.88 | −7.34 |
| Turnout | | 2,225 | 61.08 | −7.44 |
| Eligible voters | | 3,643 | | |
| Liberal hold | | Swing | | +3.12 |
Source: Elections Ontario

1867 Ontario general election
| Party | Candidate | Votes | % |
|---|---|---|---|
| Liberal | William Beatty | 1,298 | 54.22 |
| Conservative | E.A. Pew | 1,096 | 45.78 |
| Total valid votes | | 2,394 | 68.52 |
| Eligible voters | | 3,494 | |
| Liberal pickup new district. | | | |
Source: Elections Ontario

1879 Ontario general election
| Party | Candidate | Votes | % | ±% |
|---|---|---|---|---|
| Conservative | Daniel Near | 1,966 | 50.97 | +3.48 |
| Liberal | James Currie | 1,891 | 49.03 | −3.48 |
| Total valid votes | | 3,857 | 66.49 | |
| Eligible voters | | 5,801 | | |
| Conservative gain from Liberal | | Swing | | +3.48 |
Source: Elections Ontario

== 2007 electoral reform referendum ==
2007 Ontario electoral reform referendum
| Side | Votes | % |
|---|---|---|
| First Past the Post | 26,925 | 60.1 |
| Mixed member proportional | 17,859 | 39.9 |
| Total valid votes | 44,784 | 100.0 |

== See also ==
- List of Ontario provincial electoral districts
- Canadian provincial electoral districts
