= Fred Wilson (politician) =

Canadian politician

The Honourable Fred Wilson ECO

Ontario MPP
- In office 1990–1995
- Preceded by: Larry South
- Succeeded by: Bill Vankoughnet
- Constituency: Frontenac—Addington

Personal details
- Born: c. 1941 Toronto, Ontario, Canada
- Party: New Democrat
- Spouse: Ingrid

Fred Wilson (born c. 1941) is a former politician in Ontario, Canada. He served as a New Democratic Party member of the Legislative Assembly of Ontario from 1990 to 1995, and was a cabinet minister in the government of Bob Rae.

== Background ==
Wilson was born in Toronto. He went to school at Algonquin College and the University of Ottawa. After graduation, he joined the army where he was stationed in Kingston, Ontario. After leaving the army he worked at Bell Canada and then as a sector representative at the Workers' Compensation Board in Kingston.

== Politics ==
Wilson was elected to the Ontario legislature in the provincial election of 1990, defeating incumbent Liberal Larry South by 1,400 votes in the rural Eastern Ontario riding of Frontenac—Addington.

The NDP formed a majority government and Wilson was appointed as parliamentary assistant to the Minister of Correctional Services. On April 22, 1991 he was promoted to Minister of Government Services. On February 3, 1993, he was named a minister without portfolio and Chief Government Whip.

In 1994, Wilson was one of twelve NDP members to vote against Bill 167, a bill extending financial benefits to same-sex partners. Premier Bob Rae allowed a free vote on the bill which allowed members of his party to vote with their conscience.

The NDP were defeated in the provincial election of 1995, and Wilson was defeated in his own riding, finishing third against Progressive Conservative Bill Vankoughnet and a Liberal candidate.

Rae ministry, Province of Ontario (1990–1995)
Cabinet post (1)
| Predecessor | Office | Successor |
| Frances Lankin | Minister of Government Services; 1991–1993 | Brian Charlton |
Special Parliamentary Responsibilities
| Predecessor | Title | Successor |
| Shirley Coppen | Chief Government Whip; 1993–1995 | David Turnbull |
