= Ellis Morningstar =

Canadian politician

Ellis Price Morningstar

Ontario MPP
- In office 1951–1975
- Preceded by: Harold William Walker
- Succeeded by: Mel Swart
- Constituency: Welland

Personal details
- Born: August 9, 1902 Welland, Ontario
- Died: February 28, 1982 (aged 79) Welland, Ontario
- Party: Progressive Conservative

Ellis Price Morningstar (August 9, 1902 – February 28, 1982) was a politician in Ontario, Canada. He was a Progressive Conservative member of the Legislative Assembly of Ontario from 1951 until 1975 who represented the riding of Welland.

== Background ==
Morningstar was a lifelong resident of Welland, Ontario.

== Politics ==
Morningstar began his political career in 1934 when he became a city councilor for Crowland Township; later rising to the post of reeve. He was first elected in the general election in 1951 and was subsequently re-elected in the general elections in 1955, 1959, 1963, 1967 and 1971, winning by large margins. He served on a variety of Standing and Select Committees, as a Member of successive PC governments under Premiers Leslie Frost, John Robarts and Bill Davis. He retired from politics in 1975. He was the longest serving MPP from the riding of Welland.
