= Peter Kormos =

Canadian politician (1952–2013)

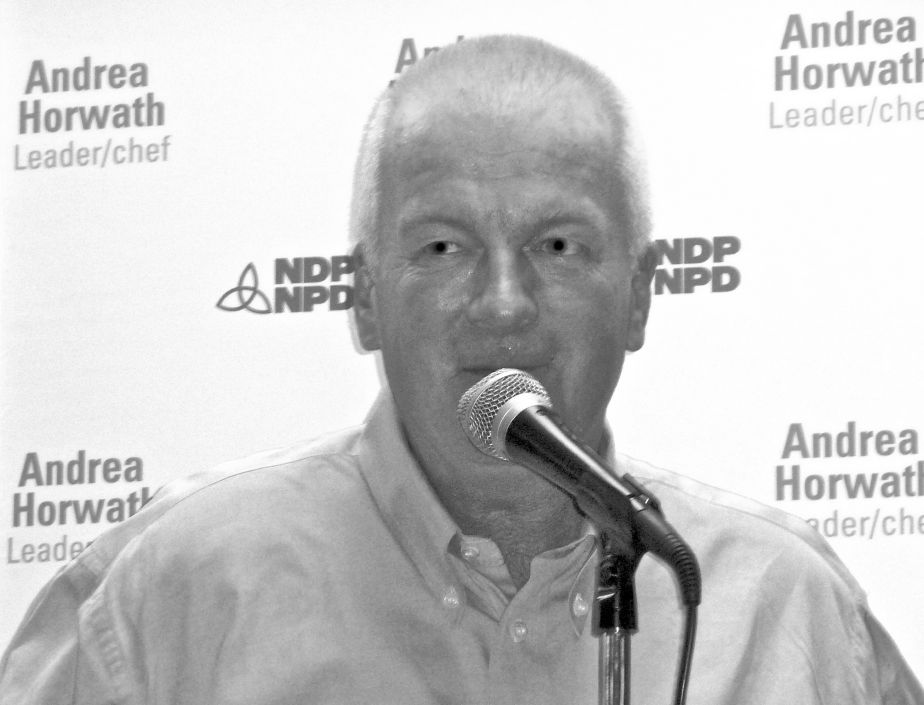
- Kormos at an ONDP event in August 2009

Minister of Consumer and Commercial Relations
- In office 1990–1991
- Preceded by: Greg Sorbara
- Succeeded by: Marilyn Churley

Ministry of Financial Institutions
- In office 1990–1991
- Preceded by: Murray Elston
- Succeeded by: Brian Charlton

Member of Provincial Parliament
- In office 2007–2011
- Preceded by: Constituency created
- Succeeded by: Cindy Forster
- Constituency: Welland
- In office 1999–2007
- Preceded by: Constituency created
- Succeeded by: constituency dissolved
- Constituency: Niagara Centre
- In office 1988–1999
- Preceded by: Mel Swart
- Succeeded by: Constituency dissolved
- Constituency: Welland—Thorold

Niagara Regional Councillor
- In office March 27, 2012 – March 30, 2013
- Preceded by: Cindy Forster
- Succeeded by: Daniel Fortier

Personal details
- Born: October 7, 1952 Welland, Ontario, Canada
- Died: March 30, 2013 (aged 60) Welland, Ontario, Canada
- Party: New Democratic Party
- Occupation: Lawyer

Peter Kormos (October 7, 1952 – March 30, 2013) was a politician in Welland, Ontario, Canada. A lawyer by profession, he was first elected as an Ontario New Democratic Party (ONDP) Member of Provincial Parliament (MPP) to the Legislative Assembly of Ontario in the Welland constituency in a 1988 provincial by-election. He replaced veteran NDP legislator Mel Swart. Kormos was re-elected in every subsequent Ontario general election until his retirement from provincial politics in 2011.

In 2012, he was elected to Niagara Regional Council in a by-election.

== Early life and education ==
Peter Eric Kormos had Slovak and Hungarian origins from his father, Michael, and Belgian origins from mother, Simone. Peter was the third of six children: Michael, Elaine, Peter, Nadine, Mark, and Sam.

Kormos first attained notoriety in the Welland area while still in high school, while president of his student council. Kormos led a sit-in student strike against local administration practices and students' rights. The week-long strike attracted a small minority of students while classes continued and resulted in Kormos's temporary expulsion. He was later educated at Niagara College, York University and Osgoode Hall in Toronto. Called to the bar in 1980, Kormos then worked as a barrister in the Niagara Region.

== Provincial politics ==
Kormos was a practicing criminal lawyer, and a local Welland city councillor in 1988, when long-time Welland Member of Provincial Parliament (MPP) Mel Swart decided to retire for health reasons. Swart was a populist ONDP MPP, in a heavily unionized constituency. The constituency had a long history of electing "populist" politicians, going back to 1951 to Swart's predecessor, Ellis Morningstar. The by-election occurred in the middle of two other major elections at the time: the Canadian General election known as the "Free Trade" election, and the Welland city council election. Kormos continued the "populist" approach pioneered by Morningstar and Swart, and won a heated – and what the Toronto Star called, "[a] vote as dirty as mudwrestling" – election on November 3, 1988.

=== In government 1990–1995 ===
The NDP won government under Bob Rae in the general election of 1990, and Kormos was appointed to cabinet as Minister of Consumer and Commercial Relations and Minister of Financial Institutions on October 1, 1990. Notably, he was expected to implement a public auto insurance system, one of the promises of the recent election campaign. Rae had mixed feelings about appointing Kormos to his cabinet. He said in his book, Protest to Power, "It was better to have him inside the tent pissing out than outside the tent pissing in. The problem was that he ended up inside the tent pissing in." Once in cabinet Rae described him as "an impossible colleague and even more difficult minister. He missed meetings, threw tantrums, and belittled his colleagues in cabinet committee."

At the same time Kormos launched a campaign against beer company advertising which he called sexist and exploitative. Somewhat inconsistently, he elicited controversy by appearing, fully clothed, as a "Sunshine Boy" model in the Toronto Sun tabloid. This was anathema to some in the party, because of the Sun's politically conservative position and because of the Sunshine Boy's place as a parallel to the "Sunshine Girl" franchise, pictures of scantily-clothed women given considerably more prominence than the Sunshine Boy. Due to the situation, Rae fired Kormos from cabinet on March 18, 1991, after he refused to resign.

Rae handed the auto insurance file to Brian Charlton but after considerable discussion, the party backed away from this goal, against considerable opposition from the outspoken Kormos and other party members, including Swart and Kormos' supporter and fellow MPP Mark Morrow.

For the remainder of Rae's term in office, Kormos acted as an unofficial "left opposition" within the NDP caucus, together with Morrow and, until his resignation, Anglican priest Dennis Drainville. In 1993, this group and former cabinet minister Karen Haslam were the only NDP MPPs to vote against the Rae government's Social Contract legislation.

The NDP were defeated in the 1995 provincial election, though Kormos's personal popularity was such that he was re-elected without difficulty.

=== In opposition 1995–2011 ===
After Rae's retirement, Kormos sought the leadership of the Ontario NDP at the convention held on June 22, 1996. He placed third, behind Frances Lankin and Howard Hampton. He played a 'dark horse' role by attacking Lankin over her support of the Social Contract. Even though he released his delegates after he lost on the third ballot, his behaviour during the convention was a significant factor in Hampton's victory.

In 1996, Kormos was charged with assaulting a security guard at the Family Support Services office in North York, Ontario. Kormos challenged the charges on the basis that the prosecution amounted to an abuse of the court’s process by the Attorney General, but his challenge was dismissed by the court. However, when the case came to trial, the judge dismissed the charges writing that there was only "some incidental contact by Mr. Kormos in order to divert Mr. Subedar's attention away from [a] cameraman's efforts to film the offices."

He was widely expected to contest the leadership in 2009, following Hampton's retirement, but instead supported the successful candidacy of Andrea Horwath.

Kormos served as House Leader for the Ontario NDP Caucus from 2001 until his retirement in 2011 and also held numerous critic portfolios in Opposition, including Justice, Community Safety and Correctional Services, Consumer and Business Services, Labour, and Democratic Renewal. On June 3, 2011, Kormos announced that he was retiring after 23 years in the legislature.

In 2005, the Big Brothers Big Sisters of Canada honoured several Ontario MPPs whose support of mentoring programs in their ridings have made a great difference in the organization's ability to provide one-on-one mentoring to children and youth. Peter Kormos was one of them.

== Niagara Regional Council ==
Kormos was elected to Niagara Regional Council in a municipal by-election on March 26, 2012, filling the seat vacated by Cindy Forster when she won election to succeed Kormos in the Legislative Assembly. He remained a member of the law firm Kormos and Evans. Kormos was an active member of the council until his death, taking part in arrangements for a public meeting, to be held in March 2013 to discuss whether Niagara's municipal governments should be amalgamated into a regional government.

== Death ==
Peter Kormos had some health problems in the years approaching his death. In 2011, he was absent from the legislature for several months just before the provincial election and he chose not to run again for MPP.

He collapsed in Toronto on Wednesday, March 27, 2013, and was taken to hospital. However, he checked himself out and returned to Welland. Kormos died on the morning of March 30, 2013 at his Welland, Ontario home. The cause of death was not immediately known, although he had been suffering Bell's palsy, back pain, and high blood pressure. An autopsy found that foul play was not a factor in his death. The cause of death was not released. Kormos was unmarried and left behind his mother and siblings.

Kormos' memorial, held in several rooms of a funeral home, attracted hundreds of attendees, including Ontario Liberal premier Kathleen Wynne and Conservative senator Bob Runciman. He was lauded by NDP leader Andrea Horwath for being a heretic in his own party.

== Views ==
Kormos represented socialist economic values with a populist, working-class presentation and genuine passion. He was notable for showing up in the provincial legislature in open-neck shirt and cowboy boots, which he stated were made locally under fair working conditions. He opposed the Third Way movement made famous by British Prime Minister Tony Blair.

== Biographical book ==
In July 2014, Brock University Professor Larry Savage published a biography of Kormos entitled Socialist Cowboy: The Politics of Peter Kormos.
