= Hollinghurst =

Hollinhurst is a surname. Notable people with the surname include:

- Alan Hollinghurst (born 1954), British author
- Anne Hollinghurst (born 1964), British Anglican bishop
- Leslie Hollinghurst (1895–1971), British World War I flying ace
