= Frontenac—Addington (provincial electoral district) =

Former provincial electoral district in Ontario, Canada

Frontenac-Addington
Ontario electoral district

Defunct provincial electoral district
- Legislature: Legislative Assembly of Ontario
- District created: 1955
- District abolished: 1996
- First contested: 1955
- Last contested: 1995

Frontenac-Addington was a provincial electoral district in Ontario, Canada. It was created in 1955 and was abolished in 1996 before the 1999 election.

== Members of Provincial Parliament ==
Frontenac-Addington
Assembly	Years	Member	Party
Created from Addington riding before the 1955 election
25th	1955–1959	David John Rankin	Progressive Conservative
26th	1959–1963	John Richard Simonett	Progressive Conservative
27th	1963–1967	John Richard Simonett	Progressive Conservative
28th	1967–1971	John Richard Simonett	Progressive Conservative
29th	1971–1975	Wilmer John Nuttall	Progressive Conservative
30th	1975–1977	Joseph Earl McEwen	Liberal
31st	1977–1981	Joseph Earl McEwen	Liberal
32nd	1981–1984	Joseph Earl McEwen	Liberal
32nd	1984–1985	Joseph Earl McEwen	Progressive Conservative
33rd	1985–1987	Larry South	Liberal
34th	1987–1990	Larry South	Liberal
35th	1990–1995	Fred Wilson	New Democratic
36th	1995–1999	Bill Vankoughnet	Progressive Conservative
Sourced from the Ontario Legislative Assembly
Merged into Hastings—Frontenac—Lennox and Addington before the 1999 election

== Election results ==
1995 Ontario general election
Party	Candidate	Votes	%	±%
Progressive Conservative	Bill Vankoughnet	12,211	38.52	+10.37
Liberal	Peter Walker	10,249	32.33	+4.13
New Democratic	Fred Wilson	7,302	23.03	–10.20
Family Coalition	Laurie Greenidge	1,404	4.43	–2.50
Independent	Ross Baker	416	1.31	–2.19
Natural Law	William Overall	121	0.38	–
Total valid votes		31,703	99.30	
Total rejected, unmarked and declined ballots		223	0.70	–0.06
Turnout		31,926	62.52	–2.63
Eligible voters		51,066		
Progressive Conservative gain from New Democratic		Swing		+10.29
Source: Elections Ontario

1990 Ontario general election
Party	Candidate	Votes	%	±%
New Democratic	Fred Wilson	9,696	33.24	+13.01
Liberal	Larry South	8,226	28.20	–18.88
Progressive Conservative	Jim Bennett	8,211	28.14	–1.85
Family Coalition	Gail Leonard	2,020	6.92	–
Independent	Ross Baker	1,021	3.50	+0.80
Total valid votes		29,174	99.24	
Total rejected, unmarked and declined ballots		222	0.76	+0.37
Turnout		29,396	65.15	+4.08
Eligible voters		45,122		
New Democratic gain from Liberal		Swing		+7.43
Source: Elections Ontario

1987 Ontario general election
Party	Candidate	Votes	%	±%
Liberal	Larry South	11,628	47.08	+1.52
Progressive Conservative	Bob Lucas	7,407	29.99	–6.26
New Democratic	Lars Thompson	4,996	20.23	+5.71
Independent	Ross Baker	667	2.70	–0.97
Total valid votes		24,698	99.61	
Total rejected ballots		96	0.39	–0.36
Turnout		24,794	61.07	+0.04
Eligible voters		40,599		
Liberal hold		Swing		+3.89
Source: Elections Ontario

1985 Ontario general election
Party	Candidate	Votes	%	±%
Liberal	Larry South	11,684	45.56	+1.35
Progressive Conservative	J. Earl McEwen	9,297	36.25	–6.53
New Democratic	Lars Thompson	3,723	14.52	+4.58
Independent	Ross Baker	941	3.67	+1.96
Total valid votes		25,645	99.26	
Total rejected ballots		192	0.74	+0.41
Turnout		25,837	61.03	–1.83
Eligible voters		42,337		
Liberal hold		Swing		+3.94
Source: Elections Ontario

1981 Ontario general election
Party	Candidate	Votes	%	±%
Liberal	J. Earl McEwen	10,558	44.21	–0.42
Progressive Conservative	Murray B. Gorham	10,218	42.79	+2.15
New Democratic	Vincent Maloney	2,374	9.94	–3.47
Independent	Ross Baker	409	1.71	+0.39
Libertarian	Sally Hayes	322	1.35	–
Total valid votes		23,881	99.66	
Total rejected ballots		81	0.34	–0.01
Turnout		23,962	62.85	–4.56
Eligible voters		38,124		
Liberal hold		Swing		–1.28
Source: Elections Ontario

1977 Ontario general election
Party	Candidate	Votes	%	±%
Liberal	J. Earl McEwen	10,505	44.63	+0.00
Progressive Conservative	William Cousins	9,565	40.63	+2.10
New Democratic	Bill Barnes	3,157	13.41	–1.08
Independent	Ross Baker	312	1.33	–1.02
Total valid votes		23,539	99.65	
Total rejected ballots		82	0.35	+0.13
Turnout		23,621	67.41	–3.33
Eligible voters		35,040		
Liberal hold		Swing		–1.05
Source: Elections Ontario

1975 Ontario general election
Party	Candidate	Votes	%	±%
Liberal	J. Earl McEwen	10,372	44.63	+15.19
Progressive Conservative	Wilmer John Nuttall	8,957	38.54	+0.49
New Democratic	Bill Barnes	3,368	14.49	+3.99
Independent	Ross Baker	545	2.34	–
Total valid votes		23,242	99.79	
Total rejected ballots		50	0.21	–0.35
Turnout		23,292	70.74	–0.93
Eligible voters		32,924		
Liberal gain from Progressive Conservative		Swing		+7.35
Source: Elections Ontario

1971 Ontario general election
Party	Candidate	Votes	%	±%
Progressive Conservative	Wilmer John Nuttall	7,539	38.05	–14.74
Liberal	Ken Keyes	5,833	29.44	–0.26
Independent	J. Earl McEwen	4,363	22.02	–
New Democratic	Vincent Maloney	2,081	10.50	–7.01
Total valid votes		19,816	99.43	
Total rejected ballots		113	0.57	–0.24
Turnout		19,929	71.67	+10.38
Eligible voters		27,806		
Progressive Conservative hold		Swing		–7.24
Source: Elections Ontario

1967 Ontario general election
Party	Candidate	Votes	%	±%
Progressive Conservative	John Richard Simonett	6,888	52.79	–2.32
Liberal	Lorne Lloyd	3,875	29.70	–8.91
New Democratic	Ian Stewart	2,285	17.51	+11.23
Total valid votes		13,048	99.19	
Total rejected ballots		106	0.81	+0.04
Turnout		13,154	61.29	+0.09
Eligible voters		21,462		
Progressive Conservative hold		Swing		+3.30
Source: Elections Ontario

1963 Ontario general election
Party	Candidate	Votes	%	±%
Progressive Conservative	John Richard Simonett	6,746	55.11	–1.70
Liberal	Armand Quintal	4,727	38.61	+0.41
New Democratic	Vincent Maloney	769	6.28	+1.29
Total valid votes		12,242	99.24	
Total rejected ballots		94	0.76	+0.04
Turnout		12,336	61.20	–6.17
Eligible voters		20,156		
Progressive Conservative hold		Swing		–1.06
Source: Elections Ontario

1959 Ontario general election
Party	Candidate	Votes	%	±%
Progressive Conservative	John Richard Simonett	6,834	56.81	–5.58
Liberal	Armand Quintal	4,596	38.20	+5.67
Co-operative Commonwealth	Morley Francis Mills	600	4.99	–0.08
Total valid votes		12,030	99.27	
Total rejected ballots		88	0.73	–0.17
Turnout		12,118	67.37	+1.70
Eligible voters		17,987		
Progressive Conservative hold		Swing		–5.62
Source: Elections Ontario

1955 Ontario general election
Party	Candidate	Votes	%
Progressive Conservative	David John Rankin	6,508	62.39
Liberal	Thomas W. Warner	3,394	32.54
Co-operative Commonwealth	Howard A. Minifie	529	5.07
Total valid votes		10,431	99.11
Total rejected ballots		94	0.89
Turnout		10,525	65.67
Eligible voters		16,027	
Progressive Conservative pickup new district.			
Source: Elections Ontario

== See also ==
- List of Ontario provincial electoral districts
- Canadian provincial electoral districts
