= Larry South =

Canadian politician (1925–2022)

Ontario MPP
- In office 1985–1990
- Preceded by: J. Earl McEwen
- Succeeded by: Fred Wilson
- Constituency: Frontenac—Addington

Personal details
- Born: February 26, 1925 Toronto, Ontario, Canada
- Died: October 28, 2022 (aged 97) near Gananoque, Ontario, Canada
- Party: Liberal

Laurence George South (February 26, 1925 – October 28, 2022) was a Canadian politician in Ontario. He served as a Liberal member of the Legislative Assembly of Ontario from 1985 to 1990.

== Background ==
South grew up in Toronto's East End. After serving in the army at the end of WWII, he was educated at the University of Toronto, received Bachelor of Science and Master of Science degrees. He worked as an engineer with the Ontario Water Resources Commission (later, Ministry of the Environment) in Toronto and then Kingston. On retirement, South entered political life.

== Politics ==
South was elected to the Ontario legislature in the 1985 provincial election, defeating Progressive Conservative incumbent J. Earl McEwen by about 2,500 votes in the eastern Ontario riding of Frontenac—Addington. He was re-elected by a greater margin in the 1987 election, but lost to Fred Wilson of the NDP by 1,400 votes in the 1990 election. He was a backbench supporter of David Peterson's government during his time in the legislature, and served as a parliamentary assistant in 1987 and 1988–1989. He was an opponent of nuclear energy during his time in office.

== Personal life and death ==
South died at his home near Gananoque, Ontario, on October 28, 2022, at the age of 97.
