= Cindy Forster =

Canadian politician

Member of the Ontario Provincial Parliament for Welland
- In office October 6, 2011 – June 7, 2018
- Preceded by: Peter Kormos
- Succeeded by: Jeff Burch

Mayor of Welland, Ontario
- In office 2000–2003
- Preceded by: Jon Reuter
- Succeeded by: Damian Goulborne

Personal details
- Born: 1953 (age 72–73)
- Party: New Democrat
- Occupation: Nurse

Cindy Forster (born c. 1953) is a politician in Ontario, Canada. She was a New Democratic member of the Legislative Assembly of Ontario who represented the riding of Welland as an MPP from 2011 until 2018.

== Background ==
Forster was born and raised in Welland, Ontario. She worked as a nurse before entering politics.

== Politics ==
Forster was mayor of Welland from 2000 to 2003, and later represented the city on Niagara Regional Council. She was succeeded on Niagara Regional Council by Peter Kormos, her predecessor as Welland's MPP.

She ran in the 2011 provincial election as the New Democratic candidate in the riding of Welland. She defeated Progressive Conservative candidate Domenic Ursini by 5,479 votes. She was re-elected in the 2014 provincial election defeating PC candidate Frank Campion by 8,334 votes.

She is the party's critic for Labour.

On January 3, 2017, Forster announced that she would not seek re-election in 2018.
