= Frances Lankin =

Canadian politician (born 1954)

The Honourable Frances Lankin PC CM ECO

Canadian Senator from Ontario
- In office March 18, 2016 – October 21, 2024
- Nominated by: Justin Trudeau
- Appointed by: David Johnston

Government Liaison in the Senate
- In office May 28, 2024 – October 20, 2024
- Leader: Marc Gold
- Preceded by: Michèle Audette
- Succeeded by: Iris Petten

Member of the Legislative Assembly of Ontario
- In office 1999–2001
- Preceded by: riding established
- Succeeded by: Michael Prue
- Constituency: Beaches—East York
- In office 1990–1999
- Preceded by: Marion Bryden
- Succeeded by: riding dissolved
- Constituency: Beaches—Woodbine

Personal details
- Born: April 16, 1954 (age 72) London, Ontario, Canada
- Party: Independent Senators Group (2016-2024, May - October 2024); Non-affiliated (February - May 2024)
- Other political affiliations: New Democratic (1990-2016)
- Spouse: Wayne Campbell (died November 2022)
- Occupation: Administrator

Frances Lankin PC CM (born April 16, 1954) is a former Canadian senator, former president and CEO of United Way Toronto, and a former Ontario MPP and cabinet minister in the NDP government of Bob Rae between 1990 and 1995. From 2010 to 2012, she co-chaired a government commission review of social assistance in Ontario. From 2009 to 2016, she was a member of the Security Intelligence Review Committee.

Lankin was appointed to the Senate on March 18, 2016, on the advice of Prime Minister Justin Trudeau. She sat with the Independent Senators Group until February 2024 when she accepted to become the Government Liaison in the upper chamber to table and help adopt a package of rule changes that increases the equity between the different groups in the Senate. Her time at the Government Representative's Office (GRO) changed her designation to non-affiliated. Following the adoption of the rules package modifications, she rejoined the ISG in May 2024. She retired from the Senate on October 21, 2024, prior to her mandatory retirement date.

== Background ==
Lankin was born in London, Ontario. She started her career as the executive director of a childcare centre before attending the University of Toronto to study criminology. Due to a provincial government hiring freeze, Lankin was unable to get a position in her desired field, working in probation and parole, so she accepted a position as a correctional officer. Lankin was one of the first women correctional officers to work at the Don Jail, an all-male institution. After four years, Lankin became a probation and parole officer before taking a position with the Ontario Public Service Employees Union (OPSEU).

Lankin was a very active member of OPSEU, where she focused on many issues of concern to women workers. She took a position as Equal Opportunity Coordinator with the union, working on such issues as paid maternity leave, pay equity and childcare. While at OPSEU, Lankin helped found the Ontario Coalition for Better Childcare and was provincial spokesperson for the Equal Pay Coalition. She eventually became an economic researcher and finally a full-time negotiator for the union. During her time at OPSEU, Lankin was appointed by the provincial government to the Workers' Compensation Appeals Tribunal for a 3-year term.

== Provincial politics ==
=== In government ===
In 1985, Lankin tried to be the NDP nomination candidate in the riding of Riverdale. She lost to David Reville who went on to win the seat.

Lankin was elected Member of Provincial Parliament (MPP) for the Toronto riding of Beaches—Woodbine in the 1990 provincial election, succeeding Marion Bryden who retired from politics. The NDP under Bob Rae won its first-ever majority government in this election, and Lankin, then thirty-six years old, was appointed to cabinet on October 1, 1990, as Minister of Government Services and Chair of the Management Board of Cabinet. She announced that same-sex spouses of civil servants would be eligible for insurance and medical benefits.

Lankin was promoted to Minister of Health on April 22, 1991. She soon developed a reputation as one of the most proficient ministers in Rae's government, and won praise for her attention to administrative detail. She managed to bring the $17 billion health budget under control by reducing out-of-province charges to OHIP and reducing costs for the province's drug benefit plan. She also increased funding for AIDS initiatives and made it easier for Ontario residents to receive treatment for drug and alcohol addiction. She also became one of Rae's most trusted ministers, and a part of his "inner circle".

On February 3, 1993, Lankin was shifted to the position of Minister of Economic Development and Trade.

The Rae government was defeated in the provincial election of 1995, although Lankin was re-elected in Beaches-Woodbine by about 3,000 votes over her nearest opponent. After the election she was named finance critic and party whip.

=== Cabinet positions ===
Rae ministry, Province of Ontario (1990–1995)
Cabinet posts (3)
Predecessor	Office	Successor
Ministry created (Note: The ministry was created from the old Ministry of Industry, Trade and Technology led by Ed Philip.)	Minister of Economic Development and Trade; 1993–1995; Also Responsible for telecommunications.	Bill Saunderson
Evelyn Gigantes	Minister of Health; 1991–1993	Ruth Grier
Chris Ward	Minister of Government Services; 1990–1991 also Chair of Management Board	Fred Wilson

=== Leadership race ===
When Rae resigned as NDP leader in 1996, Lankin declared herself a candidate to succeed him. She was regarded as the frontrunner in this race, and was strongly supported by senior members of the Rae government and the party establishment. However, this identification actually damaged her popularity among party delegates who were disappointed by the rightward shifts of the Rae government. Rival candidate Peter Kormos accused her in the leadership debate of bearing responsibility for the "social contract" — which forced open collective bargaining agreements with public sector unions and was deeply unpopular with labour — and for the Rae government's abandonment of a promise to institute a publicly run auto insurance system.

Lankin's actual position in relation to the "social contract" was somewhat complicated. She initially opposed the Rae government's plans to revisit existing labour contracts, and personally warned Rae of the fallout that would result from organized labour. She later considered resigning from cabinet over the issue on two separate occasions, but ultimately chose to remain because (she argued) it would give her the opportunity to moderate the legislation. She did, in fact, replace Rae's initial plans for outright wage rollbacks with requirements that workers above a certain income level take unpaid leave days. Even in this moderated form, however, the legislation was highly unpopular and strained the NDP's relations with the labour movement.

As a result of criticisms from Kormos and others, many of Lankin's potential supporters went to rival candidate Howard Hampton, who had also been a cabinet minister in the Rae government, but was not part of Rae's inner circle. Hampton defeated Lankin on the third ballot by fewer than 200 votes.

=== In opposition ===
While in opposition, she wrote and submitted a private-members' bill banning the use of restraints on elderly patients. Her bill was unanimously carried by all parties in the Legislature and became one of two private members bills submitted and passed by Lankin, a very rare accomplishment for a third-party opposition MPP. She was inspired to propose the bill after discovering that her own mother suffering from dementia had been tied to her bed in a Toronto area hospital.

In the 1999 Ontario election, which reduced the NDP to only nine seats, Lankin scored a convincing re-election victory in the redistributed riding of Beaches—East York. Lankin resigned her seat in June 2001 to accept a position as president and CEO of United Way Toronto.

== United Way Toronto ==
Lankin was the president and CEO of United Way Toronto from 2001 to 2011, guiding the organization through its transformation from a trusted fundraiser to an organization dedicated to addressing underlying root causes of social problems. Under Lankin's leadership, United Way Toronto engaged in a number of strategic initiatives that aimed to improve the lives of individuals, families and neighbourhoods in Toronto, including:

- a five-year plan to develop social infrastructure and engage residents in priority neighbourhoods identified in conjunction with the City of Toronto
- partnerships with government, business and labour to focus attention and resources on United Way Toronto's key priority areas: neighbourhoods, youth and newcomers
- development of social research reports such as Losing Ground: The Persistent Growth of Family Poverty in Canada's Largest City, Decade of Decline: Poverty and Income Inequality in the City of Toronto in the 1990s and Poverty by Postal Code: The Geography of Neighbourhood Poverty to identify and highlight challenges faced by the most underserved inner-suburbs of Toronto
- building and strengthening United Way Toronto's network of health and social service agencies through funding and development of agency capacity and leadership
- mobilization of the community's volunteer and financial resources

Lankin retired from the United Way in 2011.

== Other work ==
In addition to her role at United Way, Lankin has served on several Crown, not-for-profit, charitable and corporate boards. Over the years, she has served on the boards of Equal Voice, The Canadian Club, The Canadian Foundation for Economic Education (CFEE), Altruvest Charitable Services Seneca College, the Toronto City Summit Alliance, the University of Toronto's School of Public Policy Advisory Committee, the Board of the Ontario Hospital Association, the Board of the Literary Review of Canada, the Mowat Centre's Advisory Committee, the National NewsMedia Council, the Ontario Press Council, the Institute of Corporate Directors, the TELUS Toronto Community Board, Metrolinx, Hydro One and the Ontario Lottery and Gaming Corporation. She co-chaired the Toronto City Summit in June 2002 and 2003.

In 2006, she co-chaired a federal government Blue Ribbon Panel, which made recommendations for improving how the federal government distributes grants and contributions to charities and other organizations.

In 2009, Lankin was sworn into the Queen's Privy Council of Canada, appointed by prime minister Stephen Harper as a member of the Security Intelligence Review Committee, which provides an external review of the Canadian Security Intelligence Service.

In 2010, the provincial government of Ontario announced the appointment of Lankin and Munir Sheikh to lead the Commission for the Review of Social Assistance in Ontario, as part of the province's poverty reduction strategy. They released a report, Brighter Prospects: Transforming Social Assistance in Ontario, in 2012 with their findings.

In 2012, Lankin was named a Trudeau mentor by the Pierre Elliot Trudeau Foundation, and in 2013, she became a fellow at the Broadbent Institute.

In 2014, Lankin was appointed to the Ontario Premier's Advisory Council on Government Assets, whose mandate was to review and identify opportunities to modernize government business enterprises. Lankin also served as a member and chair of the Ontario Press Council and was the inaugural chair of the National NewsMedia Council.

== Awards ==
On June 29, 2012, Lankin was made a Member of the Order of Canada. Her citation reads, "For her contributions to social justice as a politician and as a social service administrator, championing the rights of women and the disadvantaged." She has received numerous awards including honorary Doctor of Laws degrees from Queen's University, Ryerson University and the University of Windsor, as well as a Doctor of Education from Nipissing University.

Other awards Lankin has received include:

- 2002 – Elizabeth Fry Society of Toronto – Rebel for a Cause
- 2003 – Queen's Golden Jubilee Medal
- 2004 – United Way Canada's - Award of Excellence
- 2006 – Carlton University, Arthur Kroger Award for Policy
- 2007 – Canadian Public Relations Society - CEO Award of Excellence in Public Relations
- 2008 – GTA Consumer's Choice - Women of the Year Award
- 2008 – CA-Queen's Centre for Governance Voluntary Sector Reporting Award For Excellence in Financial Reporting
- 2008 – Equal Voice's - EVE Award
- 2008 – More Magazine's - Top 40 over 40 Women in Canada
- 2009 - CA-Queen's Centre for Governance Voluntary Sector Reporting Award For Excellence in Financial Reporting
- 2009 – Italian Canadian Chamber of Commerce’ Community Building Award
- 2010 – Community Service Award – Black Action Defence Committee
- 2010 – Tropicanna President's Award
- 2010 – Herb Carnegie Foundation – Future Aces Lifetime Achievement Award
- 2010 - CA-Queen's Centre for Governance Voluntary Sector Reporting Award For Excellence in Financial Reporting
- 2011 – Toronto Community Social Planning Committee – Community Leadership Award
- 2012 – Queen's Diamond Jubilee Medal

== Federal politics ==
Lankin was appointed to the Senate on March 18, 2016, on the advice of Prime Minister Justin Trudeau.

During her time in the Senate, she has been a member of the National Security and Intelligence Committee of Joint Parliamentarians (NSICOP) since its inception in 2018, until today. She previously served on the Senate standing Committee on Legal and Constitutional Affairs, on the Aboriginal Peoples, the Senate standing Committee on Internal Economy, Budgets and Administration, the Senate special Committee on Senate Modernization, the Senate standing Committee on Rules, Procedures and the Rights of Parliament, the Senate standing committee on Social Affairs, science and technology and the Senate standing Committee on National Security and Defence.

Lankin has sponsored four bills in the Senate:

- Bill S-3: An Act to amend the Indian Act in response to the Superior Court of Quebec decision in Descheneaux c. Canada, which amended the Indian Act in response to concerns of sex-based discrimination in the Act.
- Bill C-210: An Act to amend the National Anthem Act, which made Canada's national anthem gender neutral.
- Bill C-375: An Act to amend the Criminal Code (presentence report), which sought to include information on mental health in pre-sentence reports.
- Bill C-101: An Act to amend the Customs Tariff and the Canadian International Trade Tribunal Act, which provided greater flexibility to the federal government to address trade surges.

== Electoral record ==
=== Provincial record ===
1999 Ontario general election
Party	Candidate	Votes	%	±%
New Democratic	Frances Lankin	19,703	45.9	+3.5
Progressive Conservative	Judy Burns	12,776	29.8	-1.1
Liberal	Bill Buckingham	9,332	21.8	-2.3
Green	Michael Schulman	431	1.0	-
Family Coalition	Dan Largy	264	0.6	-
Natural Law	Donalda G. Fredeen	230	0.5	-0.1
Independent	Steve Rutchinski	164	0.4	-

1995 Ontario general election
Party	Candidate	Votes	%	±%
New Democratic	Frances Lankin	10,862	42.4	-16.0
Progressive Conservative	Lynda Buffett	7,923	30.9	+16.6
Liberal	Stephen Lautens	6,158	24.1	-1.6
Independent	Brad Allen	319	1.2	-
Communist	Miguel Figueroa	169	0.7	–
Natural Law	Donalda G. Fredeen	162	0.6	-

1990 Ontario general election
Party	Candidate	Votes	%	±%
New Democratic	Frances Lankin	14,381	58.4	-
Liberal	Beryl Potter	6,329	25.7	-
Progressive Conservative	Kevin Forest	3,535	14.3	-
Independent	Sam Vitulli	400	1.6	-

=== 1996 leadership convention ===
Candidate	1st ballot		2nd ballot		3rd ballot	
Name	Votes cast	%	Votes cast	%	Votes cast	%
Howard Hampton	649	33.7	806	43.4	971	55.0
Frances Lankin	611	31.7	691	36.3	793	45.0
Peter Kormos	434	22.5	402	21.1		
Tony Silipo	232	12.0				
Total	1,926	100.0	1,899	100.0	1,764	100.0
