= Daniel Near =

Canadian politician

Daniel Near (January 24, 1825 – October 26, 1890) was an Ontario political figure. He represented Welland in the Legislative Assembly of Ontario from 1879 to 1883 as a Liberal member.

He was born in Humberstone Township in 1825, the son of John Near, and grew up there. He married Elizabeth Cronmiller in 1851 and then, in 1855, Mary Harwisch, after his first wife died. He served five years as reeve of Humberstone and was also a justice of the peace. He died at Humberstone in 1890 at the age of 65.
