= Marshall Vaughan =

Canadian politician

Marshall Vaughan (March 16, 1884 – 1959) was an Ontario merchant and political figure. He represented Welland in the Legislative Assembly of Ontario from 1923 to 1934 as a Conservative member.

He was born in Gainsborough Township, Lincoln County, Ontario, the son of Wilford Vaughan. He was a wholesale dealer in seeds. In 1911, he married Evelyn Maud House. Vaughan was the first mayor of Welland, serving in 1917 and 1918. He was a recruiter for the Royal Flying Corps during World War I. He was a Mason and a member of the Orange Order and the Knights of Pythias. He died in 1959 and was buried at Fonthill Cemetery.
