= Social Contract (Ontario) =

1993 government initiative in Ontario, Canada

The Social Contract Act was a statute passed by the Legislative Assembly of Ontario in 1993 as part of an initiative by the provincial government to mitigate the negative impact of the early 1990s recession and reduce the provincial deficit. Austerity measures included a wage freeze and mandatory unpaid days of leave for qualifying government employees, as well as the establishment of a job security fund. Introduced under the government of Premier Bob Rae, the unpaid days of leave became known colloquially as Rae Days.

== Overview ==
=== Background ===
During the early 1990s recession, Ontario faced an annual deficit of $12.4 billion in 1993. The government sought $2 billion in wage-concessions from public-sector workers to reduce the deficit. The social contract mandated that public-sector workers earning more than $30,000 take up to 12 unpaid days off a year.

Two of Ontario's largest unions, the Ontario Public Service Employees Union (OPSEU) and the Canadian Union of Public Employees (CUPE), initially boycotted the talks.. However, in May of 1993 they joined the tri-partite tables and worked to achieve Sector Agreements.

=== Provisions ===
1. To encourage employers, bargaining agents and employees to achieve savings through agreements at the sectoral and local levels primarily through adjustments in compensation arrangements.
2. To maximize the preservation of public sector jobs and services through improvements in productivity, including the elimination of waste and inefficiency.
3. To provide for expenditure reduction for a three-year period and to provide criteria and mechanisms for achieving the reductions.
4. To provide for a job security fund.

== Terms ==
The initiative included a measure that allowed for up to twelve days of mandatory unpaid leave per year for civil service workers, including (but not limited to) teachers, nurses, and accountants. These days of leave could be applied by leadership in sectors who were unable to otherwise meet the austerity goals set out by the province.

The measure excluded workers who earned less than $30,000 annually, or those whom a 4.6% decrease in wages would put them below that annual income.

== Aftermath ==
=== Results ===
The Social Contract Act was ultimately successful in what it had intended to do; the government saved $1.95 billion, and prevented public employee layoffs.

=== Political effects ===
The initiative was incredibly unpopular, however, and the labour-allied NDP lost a majority of its union support, including Buzz Hargrove and the Canadian Auto Workers union. Support for the provincial party fell to 6% and is thought to have negatively affected the federal NDP in the 1993 federal election. The provincial NDP was unable to recover its previous levels of support, and suffered an electoral wipeout in the 1995 Ontario general election. The Liberal Party was initially the main beneficiary of the opposition to the Social Contract, but, ultimately, the Progressive Conservatives won the election. In that campaign, the NDP was reduced from a majority to a third party, a position from which they were not able to recover from until the 2018 election, when it became the Official Opposition.

The Social Contract affected Rae during his 2006 run for leadership of the Liberal Party of Canada.
