= Frank de Jong =

Canadian politician and environmentalist

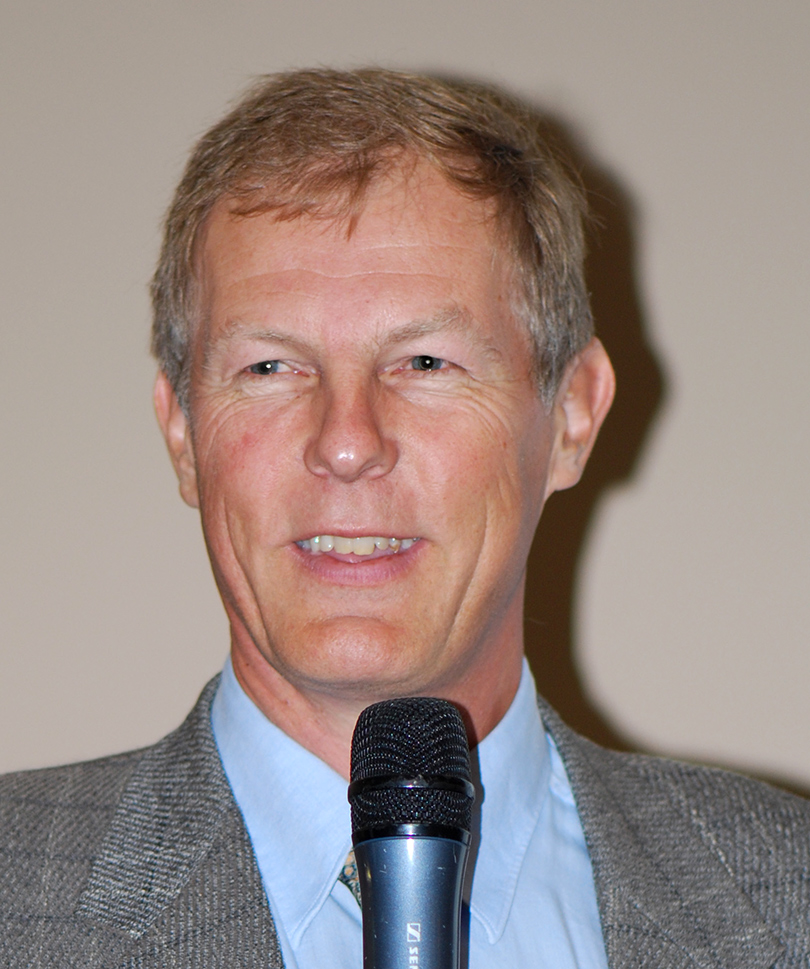
- Speaking at an economics forum in 2007

Leader of the Yukon Green Party
- In office 2016–2019
- Preceded by: Kristina Calhoun
- Succeeded by: Position abolished

Leader of the Green Party of Ontario
- In office 1993–2009
- Preceded by: Position established
- Succeeded by: Mike Schreiner

Personal details
- Born: October 16, 1955 (age 70) West Luther Township, Ontario, Canada
- Party: Green
- Other political affiliations: Ontario Green (1983–2014); Yukon Green (2016–2019)
- Occupation: Politician; environmentalist

Frank de Jong (born October 16, 1955) is a Canadian politician, Georgist, and environmentalist. He joined the Green Party of Ontario in 1987 and became the party's first official leader in 1993 – a position he held until November 14, 2009, when he was succeeded by Mike Schreiner. From 2016 to 2019 he was the leader of the Yukon Green Party. De Jong has also campaigned for federal office as a member of the Green Party of Canada.

== Education and activism ==
Born into a Dutch background, De Jong earned a Bachelor of Arts degree from the University of Western Ontario in 1978, and a Bachelor of Education from University of Ottawa in 1979. After graduating, he worked as an elementary school teacher. He developed an interest in environmental concerns during the mid-1980s, and became involved in campaigns to save Ontario's old growth forests. He was also involved in the anti-nuclear, renewable energy and pro-choice movements. De Jong now resides in Huntsville, Ontario with his partner Tove Christensen.

== Politics ==
The Ontario Green Party did not originally have a formal leadership structure, and was run in a very decentralized manner (nominal leaders were sometimes chosen for elections, but they had no personal authority over party decisions). De Jong and a broad coalition of chapters agreed to a new constitution in 1993. The legwork to facilitate the change was led by Ian Whyte in Ottawa and Jim Harris in Toronto. The actual rewriting of the constitution was led by policy coordinator Ken Toews who headed up a team to write the new constitution. The changes to the constitution were approved with an 88% majority. There is a direct line between these changes to our constitution and the eventual election of Mike Schreiner to the provincial legislature. A small number of chapters opposed this approach, and successfully campaigned for a formal leadership contest in 1993. De Jong himself entered this contest, and defeated Harris, who later became leader of the Green Party of Canada. De Jong supported Harris's leadership of the federal party until Harris stepped down in 2006, at which time de Jong supported David Chernushenko's leadership bid. He was challenged for the leadership of the Ontario Green Party by Judy Greenwood-Speers in 2001.

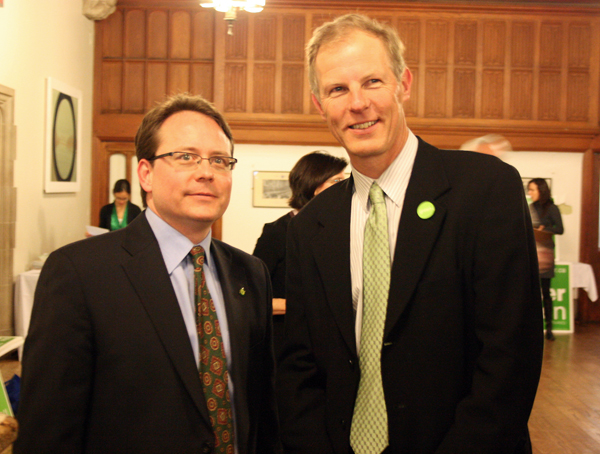
Frank De Jong (right), with his successor as Ontario Greens Leader, Mike Schreiner (left)

Like Harris, de Jong is an eco-capitalist. He defines his political philosophy as "socially progressive, fiscally conservative, and environmentally aware". He has long supported conservative economic policies, including a gradual shift from the taxation of incomes to the taxation of natural resources. He has also spoken against extensive government subsidies and funding for crown corporations.

At the October 2005 Green Party of Ontario Annual General Meeting, de Jong narrowly avoided a "leadership review" when 67% of voting members voted against it. The GPO constitution requires that a leadership review be held bi-annually; If more than one-third of voting members had opted for a review, a leadership race would have been held in 2006. At the 2007 AGM, de Jong survived the next scheduled review, this time with approximately 71% support from party members. This followed what was considered the strongest election performance by the GPO to date. Speaking at the Green Party of Ontario AGM in May 2009, de Jong announced that he would not be running for re-election as leader of the party.

In the September 14, 2006, Parkdale–High Park by-election, de Jong received 6.2 percent of the vote. On November 7, 2006, he was nominated as the GPO candidate in the riding of Davenport for the 2007 Ontario general election. In that election, de Jong captured 10.26 percent of the vote, his best showing as a member of the Green Party.

De Jong was a candidate for Ward 18 in Toronto's 2010 municipal election.

As of December 2014, de Jong was living in Faro, Yukon and was the Green Party of Canada candidate in the Yukon riding in the 2015 federal election, placing a distant fourth.

De Jong was elected leader of the Yukon Green Party in September 2016. He resigned as leader in 2019.

== Election campaigns ==
De Jong has campaigned for federal and provincial office several times. His best showing was in the provincial election of 2003, when he ran against sitting Premier Ernie Eves and finished third, ahead of the New Democratic Party candidate. On all other occasions, de Jong has finished well behind candidates of the major parties.

During the 1995 provincial campaign, de Jong cycled on a "leader's tour" from Ottawa to Sault Ste. Marie, Windsor and Niagara Falls before returning northward to Ottawa. Subsequently, he was involved in creating constituency contact lists throughout the province.

His electoral record is as follows:

1988 Canadian federal election: Rosedale
Party	Candidate	Votes	%	±%
Progressive Conservative	David MacDonald	22,704	41.36	-11.44
Liberal	Bill Graham	22,624	41.21	+15.08
New Democratic	Doug Wilson	8,266	15.06	-2.77
Libertarian	Chris Blatchly	411	0.75	+0.09
Green	Frank de Jong	397	0.72	-1.15
Rhinoceros	Liane McLarty	265	0.48	
Independent	Mike Constable	102	0.19	
Independent	Harry Margel	91	0.17	
Commonwealth of Canada	Paul Therrien	33	0.06	-0.27
Total valid votes		54,893	100	

1990 Ontario general election: Ottawa East
Party	Candidate	Votes	%	±%
Liberal	Bernard Grandmaître	16,363	62.41	−11.85
New Democratic	Lori Lucier	6,103	23.28	+7.07
Progressive Conservative	Diana Morin	2,203	8.40	−1.13
Family Coalition	Richard Hudon	826	3.15	
Green	Frank de Jong	723	2.76	
Total valid votes		26,218	98.78	
Total rejected ballots		324	1.22	
Turnout		26,542	55.23	
Eligible voters		48,055		
Liberal hold		Swing		-9.46

1991 Ottawa municipal election

Capital Ward
Candidate	Votes	%
Jim Watson	4,123	
Lynn Smyth (X)	1,817	
Michael Lynch	638	
Frank De Jong	482	

1993 Canadian federal election: Ottawa–Vanier
Party	Candidate	Votes	%	±%
Liberal	Jean-Robert Gauthier	31,216	70.46	+11.25
Progressive Conservative	Marie-Christine Lemire	4,486	10.13	-13.07
Reform	Sam Dancey	3,553	8.02	
New Democratic	Willie Dunn	2,935	6.62	-9.36
Green	Frank de Jong	606	1.37	
National	Raymond Samuels	497	1.12	
Independent	David Talbot	429	0.97	
Natural Law	Roger Bouchard	414	0.93	
Marxist–Leninist	Serge Lafortune	138	0.31	
Abolitionist	Steven Edward White	28	0.06	
Total valid votes		44,302	100	

Canadian federal by-election, February 13, 1995: Ottawa—Vanier
Party	Candidate	Votes	%	±%	Expenditures
Liberal	Mauril Bélanger	11,918	60.06	−10.41	$52,001
Reform	Kevin Gaudet	4,034	20.33	+12.44	$36,995
Progressive Conservative	Françoise Guenette	1,899	9.57	−0.96	$30,933
New Democratic Party	Bob Lawson	1,259	6.34	−0.16	$5,764
Christian Heritage	Gilles Gauthier	299	1.51		$1,751
Green	Frank de Jong	218	1.10	−0.24	$0
Natural Law	Ian A.G. Campbell	109	0.55	−0.35	$131
Marxist-Leninist	Serge Lafortune	61	0.31	+0.02	$136
Abolitionist	John Turmel	46	0.23	+0.17	$0
Total valid votes		19,843	100.00		
Total rejected ballots		201			
Turnout		20,004	30.39	−32.04	
Electors on the lists		65,824			

1995 Ontario general election: Nepean
Party	Candidate	Votes	%	Expenditures
Progressive Conservative	John Baird	17,510	49.66	$40,800.37
Liberal	Hans Daigeler	13,575	38.50	$45,021.83
New Democratic	John Sullivan	3,274	9.29	$15,380.57
Green	Frank de Jong	390	1.11	$0.00
Natural Law	Brian E. Jackson	259	0.73	$0.00
Freedom	Cathy Frampton	252	0.71	$2,307.70
Total valid votes		35,260	100.00	
Rejected, unmarked and declined ballots		363		
Turnout		35,623	64.97	
Electors on the lists		54,832		

1997 Canadian federal election: Ottawa Centre
Party	Candidate	Votes	%	±%
Liberal	Mac Harb	25,987	45.19	-6.71
New Democratic	Jamey Heath	13,646	23.73	+1.07
Progressive Conservative	Peter Annis	9,391	16.33	+4.45
Reform	John Perocchio	6,651	11.57	+2.03
Green	Frank de Jong	855	1.49	+0.30
Canadian Action	Howard Bertram	236	0.41	
Natural Law	Neil Paterson	211	0.37	-0.34
Independent	Susan Cumby	190	0.33	
Marxist–Leninist	Hardial Bains	150	0.26	+0.07
Independent	Malek Khouri	92	0.16	
Independent	Ray Joseph Cormier	91	0.16	
Total valid votes		57,500	100	

1999 Ontario general election: Parkdale—High Park
Party	Candidate	Votes	%
Liberal	Gerard Kennedy	23,022	54.92
Progressive Conservative	Annamarie Castrilli	12,647	30.17
New Democratic	Irene Atkinson	4,937	11.78
Green	Frank de Jong	500	1.19
Libertarian	Doug Burn	325	0.78
Family Coalition	Stan Grzywna	289	0.69
Independent	Jorge Van Schouwen	99	0.24
Natural Law	Lynne Hea	99	0.24
Total valid votes		41,918	100
Source: Elections Ontario

2003 Ontario general election: Dufferin—Peel—Wellington—Grey
Party	Candidate	Votes	%	±%
Progressive Conservative	Ernie Eves	29,222	56.64	-8.12
Liberal	Dan Yake	14,859	28.8	-0.03
Green	Frank De Jong	3,161	6.13	3.68
New Democratic	Mitchel Healey	3,148	6.1	+2.13
Family Coalition	Dave Davies	1,202	2.33	

2005 by-election: Dufferin—Peel—Wellington—Grey
Party	Candidate	Votes	%	±%
Progressive Conservative	John Tory	15,610	56.3	-
Liberal	Bob Duncanson	4,625	16.7	-
New Democratic	Lynda McDougall	3,881	14.0	
Green	Frank de Jong	2,767	10.0	
Family Coalition	Paul Micelli	479	1.7	-
Independent	William Cook	163	0.6	-
Libertarian	Philip Bender	135	0.5	-
Independent	John Turmel	85	0.3	-

Ontario provincial by-election, September 14, 2006: Parkdale—High Park
Party	Candidate	Votes	%	±%
New Democratic	Cheri DiNovo	11,677	41.04	+25.27
Liberal	Sylvia Watson	9,387	32.99	-24.84
Progressive Conservative	David Hutcheon	4,921	17.29	+1.11
Green	Frank De Jong	1,753	6.16	-0.77
Family Coalition	Stan Grzywna	367	1.29	-0.2
Libertarian	Jim McIntosh	162	0.57	
Freedom	Silvio Ursomarzo	111	0.39	-0.02
Independent	John Turmel	78	0.27	
Total valid votes		28,456	100	
Source: Elections Ontario

Ontario provincial by-election, January 12, 2007, by-election: Burlington
Party	Candidate	Votes	%	±%
Progressive Conservative	Joyce Savoline	11,143	48.98	+2.83
Liberal	Joan Lougheed	9,365	41.17	-1.01
New Democratic	Cory Judson	1,310	5.76	-2.46
Green	Frank de Jong	734	3.23	+0.90
Freedom	Barry Spruce	106	0.47	
Independent	John Turmel	90	0.40	
Total valid votes		22,748	100	

2007 Ontario general election: Davenport
Party	Candidate	Votes	%	±%
Liberal	Tony Ruprecht	12,467	41.82	-13.70
New Democratic	Peter Ferreira	10,880	36.49	+7.12
Green	Frank de Jong	3,047	10.22	*
Progressive Conservative	Antonio Garcia	2,805	9.41	+2.11
Communist	Dave McKee	191	0.64	
Family Coalition	Gustavo Valdez	157	0.53	
Libertarian	Nunzio Venuto	152	0.51	*
Independent	Annette Kouri	114	0.38	
Total valid votes		29,813	100	
Liberal hold		Swing	-10.41	

2010 Toronto municipal election, Ward 18: Davenport

Ward 18
Candidate	Votes	%
Ana Bailão	6,277	43.75%
Kevin Beaulieu	4,911	34.23%
Frank de Jong	869	6.06%
Hema Vyas	776	5.41%
Joe MacDonald	669	4.66%
Kirk Russell	326	2.27%
Nha Le	154	1.07%
Ken Wood	106	0.74%
Mohammad Muhit	94	0.66%
Joanna Teliatnik	70	0.49%
Doug Carroll	52	0.36%
Abdirazak Elmi	42	0.29%
Total	14,346	100%

2011 Ontario general election: Davenport
Party	Candidate	Votes	%	±%
New Democratic	Jonah Schein	14,367	45.93	+9.44
Liberal	Cristina Martins	12,953	41.41	-0.41
Progressive Conservative	Kirk Russell	2,480	7.93	-1.48
Green	Frank de Jong	855	2.73	-7.49
Independent	Mark Jagg	250	0.80	
Communist	Miguel Figueroa	163	0.52	-0.12
Freedom	Franz Cauchi	96	0.31	
Human Rights	Alix Thompson	82	0.26	
The Only Party	Kiros Ghiwot	33	0.11	
Total valid votes		31,279	100	
Total rejected, unmarked and declined ballots		178	0.57	
Turnout		31,457	45.59	
Eligible voters		68,998		
New Democratic gain from Liberal		Swing		+4.93
Source: Elections Ontario

2015 Canadian federal election: Yukon
Party	Candidate	Votes	%	±%	Expenditures
Liberal	Larry Bagnell	10,887	53.65	+20.70	$70,585.75
Conservative	Ryan Leef	4,928	24.29	–9.48	$162,394.24
New Democratic	Melissa Atkinson	3,943	19.43	+5.06	$79,988.15
Green	Frank de Jong	533	2.63	–16.28	$20,058.66
Total valid votes/expense limit		20,291	99.54	–	$210,779.30
Total rejected ballots		94	0.46	+0.04	
Turnout		20,385	75.84	+9.60	
Eligible voters		26,879			
Liberal gain from Conservative		Swing		+15.09	
Source: Elections Canada

2016 Yukon general election: Pelly-Nisutlin
Party	Candidate	Votes	%	±%
Yukon Party	Stacey Hassard	280	42.3%	-7.1%
NDP	Ken Hodgins	207	31.2%	-0.8%
Liberal	Carl Sidney	152	23.0%	+9.9%
Green	Frank de Jong	22	3.3%	+3.3%
Total		661	100%	–

== See also ==
- List of Green party leaders in Canada

Preceded by Kristina Calhoun	Leader of the Yukon Green Party; 2016 - 2019	Succeeded by Vacant
Preceded by Position established	Leader of the Green Party of Ontario; 1993 – November 2009	Succeeded by Mike Schreiner
