= Community-based economics =

Economic theories that favor localism

Community-based economics or community economics is an economic system that encourages local substitution. It is similar to the lifeways of those practicing voluntary simplicity, including traditional Mennonite, Amish, and modern eco-village communities. It is also a subject in urban economics, related to moral purchasing and local purchasing.

The community-based economy can refer to the various initiatives coordinated through multiple forms of interactions. These interactions may involve some form of work performance; project participation; and/or relationship exchange. The forms of interaction can exclude the need to contract; can do away with the need to include some form of monetisation; as well as be free from the need to establish a structure of hierarchy. Community-based economies have been seen to involve aspects of social bonding; value promotion; and establishing community-orientated social goals.

It has been suggested that communities that meet their own needs need the global economy less. "Local-economy theory" introduces insights into new economic development that honours ecological realities and finds efficiencies in small-scale, shared knowledge at the community level.

Community-based economies have been seen to focus on the idea that the “local community should be the focal point of development”. In addition, resources and skills which are sourced locally are seen to play a pivotal role in the community. A community economies approach is interested in diverse activities that contribute to the well-being of both people and the planet. Such actions seek to help people survive well; produce and distribute surplus; transact goods and services more fairly; and invest in ways to support a better future. A community economies approach involves identifying and acknowledging the economic activities that contribute to the well-being of people and the planet and considers ways that these activities may strengthen and multiply. Community-based economics starts by acknowledging the local context and valuing the diverse economic activities and possibilities already present.

In the Philippines, the Jenga Community Partnering Project involved working with groups of community members to build on existing individual and community assets. Community economies researchers point out that the 'community' in community economies is not about pre-existing communities (such as those based on a shared identity or location). Instead, the community is a process of being with others, including the world around.

== Investment and poverty alleviation ==
Community-based development is a form of decentralisation that "devolves authority to the most local community level". Economic development projects target the poor, often in developing countries. There have been mixed results from a limited number of studies endeavouring to explore the potential for success from community-based decentralised programs. The World Bank is on record to have increased funding for community-based development from a minimum of $325 million in 1996 to a minimum of $3 billion in 2003.

Community approaches to poverty reduction address social problems that governments and the voluntary sector usually address. However, these typically incorporate methods employed by the private sector.

Community-based tourism (CBT) has been advanced as a strategy associated with community development and poverty alleviation through tourism. CBT "has become one of the sector's fastest-growing segments globally...". It is a form of tourism that started in the 1970s and is explicitly aimed at disadvantaged communities. Common challenges are linked to the scarcity of material and non-material (such as skill and education) of poor community members.

=== China ===
In 2001, China began a community-driven program for the purpose of reducing poverty levels. “Participatory village planning” was seen to have been used to promote public investments in targeted villages with higher levels of poverty. There had been programs prior to 2001 in China where investments were made to try to reduce poverty, however, these did not include much participation from the communities themselves. In the current program, each village conducts a public investment plan where projects are voted on by the village residents themselves. The government-initiated program being run in China since 2001 is one of few examples of community-based economics at play, with limited to no participation from international donors.

=== Nepal ===
Cooperatives play a vital role in community-based poverty reduction programs. The first multipurpose cooperative in Nepal was established in 1956. The purpose of establishing the cooperative was to help support the rehabilitation of flood victims.

=== United States ===
The Amish community are an example of economic development being possible without complete modernisation. Profit is given less importance to religion and its values. Farmers in the Amish community refrain from using modern technological equipment and still find ways to sell their products at market prices and make profits. By engaging in the wider economy, the Amish community are better able to deal with population growth, land price increases, as well as rises in costs of goods and services not being produced by the Amish community itself. As such, the Amish still find themselves subject to the economic factors of supply and demand changes, rapid changes in legal and political environments, as well the impacts of globalisation.

== Environmental sustainability and natural resource preservation ==
Due to the hybrid nature of many community-based natural resource management approaches, governance actors from higher than just the local community level are often involved. As such, approaches can differ widely with respect to the composition of participants. Different governance functions can be performed by different actors from different societal spheres and at different levels.

Community-based approaches may overlook or neglect broader social processes. Some communities may be too poor or conflict-ridden to be able to help themselves; 'participation fatigue' can be present, and power differentials can lead to inequitable outcomes.

"Bioregional and ecological economics theory describes the growth of local economic linkages as vital to moving post-industrial economies toward sustainability". Growing economic links involves engaging local communities to the point where they have meaningful levels of ownership over their environmental and financial resources, in order to focus on the production of resources to meet localised needs. This pattern is becoming more familiar in many parts of North America and Europe. As currently practised, Green Community Economic Development (GCED) schemes involve extending ideas to finance local economic initiatives. These initiatives feature energy and other conservation measures and environmental remediation as an essential job creation focus".

=== Australia ===
Government agencies and community groups have protocols for engaging with Aboriginal communities. In regional Australia, resource management practitioners apply projects according to engagement protocols transferred from remote Australia. Various state governments in Australia devolve powers to regional organisations to decide how to invest public funds in environmental management. This model is an example of a community based economic approach to ecological management. This approach is one that the Australian state governments have justified based on the potential benefits of developing the capacities of landholders and other stakeholders. Stakeholders then respond self-reliantly (both as individuals and in groups) to the environmental challenges.

=== Nepal ===
The state government of Nepal set up the Community Forestry programme in 1978, an initiative that saw community members being given full rights for the protection of forests. Around twenty thousand community forest user groups, including under two and a half million households are involved in the management of around two million hectares of community forest in Nepal.

=== United States ===
In many rural communities across the west of the United States, (community-based organisations (CBO)), grassroots non-profit entities focusing on revitalising their respective communities through linked natural resource stewardship and rural economic development activities, have emerged to provide direction and practical solutions to natural resource management dilemmas and social conflict. CBOs seek to help communities cope with policy and economic transitions.

== Indigenous communities ==
=== Australia ===
Since the 1970s, Indigenous communities in Australia have played leading roles in building procuring community-based services in areas such as local governing; health; housing; as well as welfare.

In Australia, a five-year research project called 'People on Country (POC), Healthy Landscapes and Indigenous Economic Futures' was undertaken by the Centre for Aboriginal Economic Policy Research at the Australian National University. This project was collaborative in nature, where the University worked with a number of community-based Aboriginal land and sea management groups in northern Australia. Work was carried out on a number of cultural and resource management issues.

=== Malawi ===
Many community-based economies have been seen in the Kasungu district of Malawi. These economies have concerned themselves with the tasks of sustaining agriculture; managing natural resources; facilitating small and medium enterprises; as well as dealing with health problems in their communities such as HIV and AIDS.

The Ngolowindo Horticultural Cooperative Society (NHCS) is one such example of community-based economies at play. It is located in the “Maganga Traditional Authority in the Salima District of Malawi's Central Regions”. The NHCS includes members from the eleven villages surrounding it and was initially known as the “Ngolowindo Self Help Irrigation Scheme (NSHIS)”. The NSHIS had seen support from the areas’ indigenous leaders. Apart from seeking to implement subsistence farming, the NHCS deals with generational income issues by focusing on achieving stability at the household level.

=== New Zealand ===
The importance of relationships was seen in the early Māori economy. Concepts such as reciprocity; flexibility; sustainability and sharing (trade) underpinned these relationships. Not only were these relationships regarded as between people, but between people and the physical world, as well as between people and the spiritual world.

== See also ==
- Anarchist economics
- Distributism
- Eco-communalism
- Economic democracy
- Fiscal localism
- Fundamentals of economics
- J. K. Gibson-Graham
- Local Food Plus
- Local food
- WWOOF
