= Marit Stiles =

Canadian politician (born 1969)

Marit Stiles MPP
- Stiles in 2026

Leader of the Official Opposition in Ontario
- Incumbent
- Assumed office February 4, 2023
- Preceded by: Peter Tabuns

Leader of the Ontario New Democratic Party
- Incumbent
- Assumed office February 4, 2023
- Preceded by: Peter Tabuns (interim)

Member of Provincial Parliament for Davenport
- Incumbent
- Assumed office June 7, 2018
- Preceded by: Cristina Martins

President of the New Democratic Party
- In office April 9, 2016 – February 18, 2018
- Preceded by: Rebecca Blaikie
- Succeeded by: Mathieu Vick

Toronto District School Board Trustee for Ward 9 (Davenport)
- In office October 27, 2014 – June 7, 2018
- Preceded by: Maria Rodrigues
- Succeeded by: Stephanie Donaldson

Other roles
- 2018–2022: Opposition Critic for Education

Personal details
- Born: September 20, 1969 (age 57) St. John's, Newfoundland, Canada
- Party: Ontario New Democratic
- Spouse: Jordan Berger
- Children: Two
- Education: Carleton University (BA)
- Occupation: Politician; policy researcher
- Website: Campaign website; Constituency website

Marit Stiles (Note: /ˈmɑːrɪt/ MAR-it;) (born September 20, 1969) is a Canadian politician who has been the leader of the Ontario New Democratic Party (NDP) and the leader of the Official Opposition since 2023. Stiles was elected to the Legislative Assembly of Ontario in 2018 and serves as the member of Provincial Parliament (MPP) for Davenport.

Born in Newfoundland, Stiles moved to Ontario to attend Carleton University. She worked as a policy researcher before becoming research and policy director with ACTRA. Stiles served as a Toronto District School Board (TDSB) trustee in 2014 and was the president of the New Democratic Party of Canada from 2016 to 2018.

== Early life and career ==
Marit Stiles was born on September 20, 1969, in St. John's, Newfoundland, growing up in the communities of Long Pond and Logy Bay. The name Marit is of Norwegian origin, although Stiles does not have Norwegian ancestry, and the name was suggested by Norwegian family friends. Her parents were Americans who had moved from Pennsylvania to Newfoundland in 1967 and settled on a small organic farm outside St. John's, growing vegetables and raising goats, chickens, geese, rabbits and pigs. Her father was an anthropology professor at Memorial University, who later became an energy conservation consultant in Canada and Africa. She competed in synchronized swimming in her childhood, alongside her younger sister Enid.

While she first attended Memorial University, in 1988 Stiles moved to Ontario to attend university there. Her first political involvement was in 1990 when she canvassed for Evelyn Gigantes along with her future partner Jordan Berger, a childhood friend with whom she became reacquainted while attending university. She graduated with a Bachelor of Arts (BA) in political science from Carleton University in 1992. She then worked in the office of Timmins MPP Gilles Bisson. She worked for the Canadian Policy Research Networks in 1995, and as a researcher for the federal NDP's Ontario caucus from 1998 to 2004. Stiles went to work for the Alliance of Canadian Cinema, Television and Radio Artists (ACTRA) in 2005, where she was the director of research, public policy and communications.

== Political career ==
=== Early political career ===
Stiles served as a trustee for the Toronto District School Board from 2014 until 2018, for ward 9.

In 2016, Stiles was elected president of the federal NDP, defeating former NDP MPs Elaine Michaud and Djaouida Sellah. Following her election, party delegates at the 2016 convention voted to remove Tom Mulcair as leader. The party later held a leadership election in 2017, which was won by Jagmeet Singh.

=== Provincial politics ===
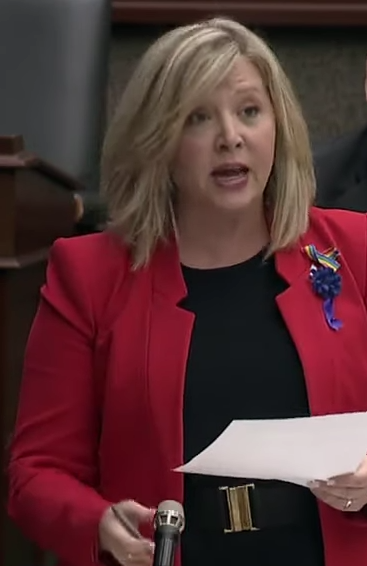
Stiles speaks during Question Period in the Legislative Assembly of Ontario, 2019

Contesting Davenport for the provincial NDP in the 2018 Ontario election, Stiles ran against Liberal incumbent Cristina Martins, who faced criticism for her government's handling of the Davenport Diamond rail overpass. Stiles campaigned for the electrification of the nearby GO Transit line and ensuring all "amenities" associated with the Davenport Diamond rail bridge are completed. She defeated Martins, becoming the riding's second NDP MPP.

Stiles was the party's education critic from 2018 to 2022.

==== Leader of the Ontario NDP ====
Following the 2022 provincial election, the NDP remained in opposition and party leader Andrea Horwath stepped down. MPP Peter Tabuns became interim leader until the party could hold a leadership election in 2023. Stiles announced that she would run for NDP leader on September 22, 2022. During her campaign, she received endorsements from eight fellow MPPs.

During her leadership campaign, Stiles outlined five priorities for the NDP and the province. She ran on climate action by creating jobs in sustainable industries and investing in green infrastructure. She called for "true reconciliation" by protecting Indigenous rights and addressing issues such as clean drinking water, treatment in the justice system and shelter. Labour was another one of her priorities, and she has stated that she would like to focus on creating jobs where workers' rights and safety are respected. Another commitment was reforming the province's electoral system and moving away from first-past-the-post. Stiles has also criticized what she perceives as the Conservatives' efforts to increase privatization of government services, and committed to improving public education, healthcare, and social security.

The NDP announced on December 5, 2022, that Stiles was the only candidate in the leadership election, and hence leader-designate. While several other MPPs had explored running for leader, none were able to meet the entry requirements—which included raising a $55,000 fee—before the December 5 deadline. She was scheduled to be acclaimed as leader on March 4, 2023, but the party's provincial council voted to move the date up to February 4. Premier Doug Ford congratulated Stiles in a brief statement posted to Twitter stating "I'm looking forward to many spirited debates as we both strive to make Ontario the best place to live, work and raise a family."

Stiles was formally confirmed on February 4, 2023, taking office as leader of the NDP and becoming the leader of the Official Opposition in Ontario.

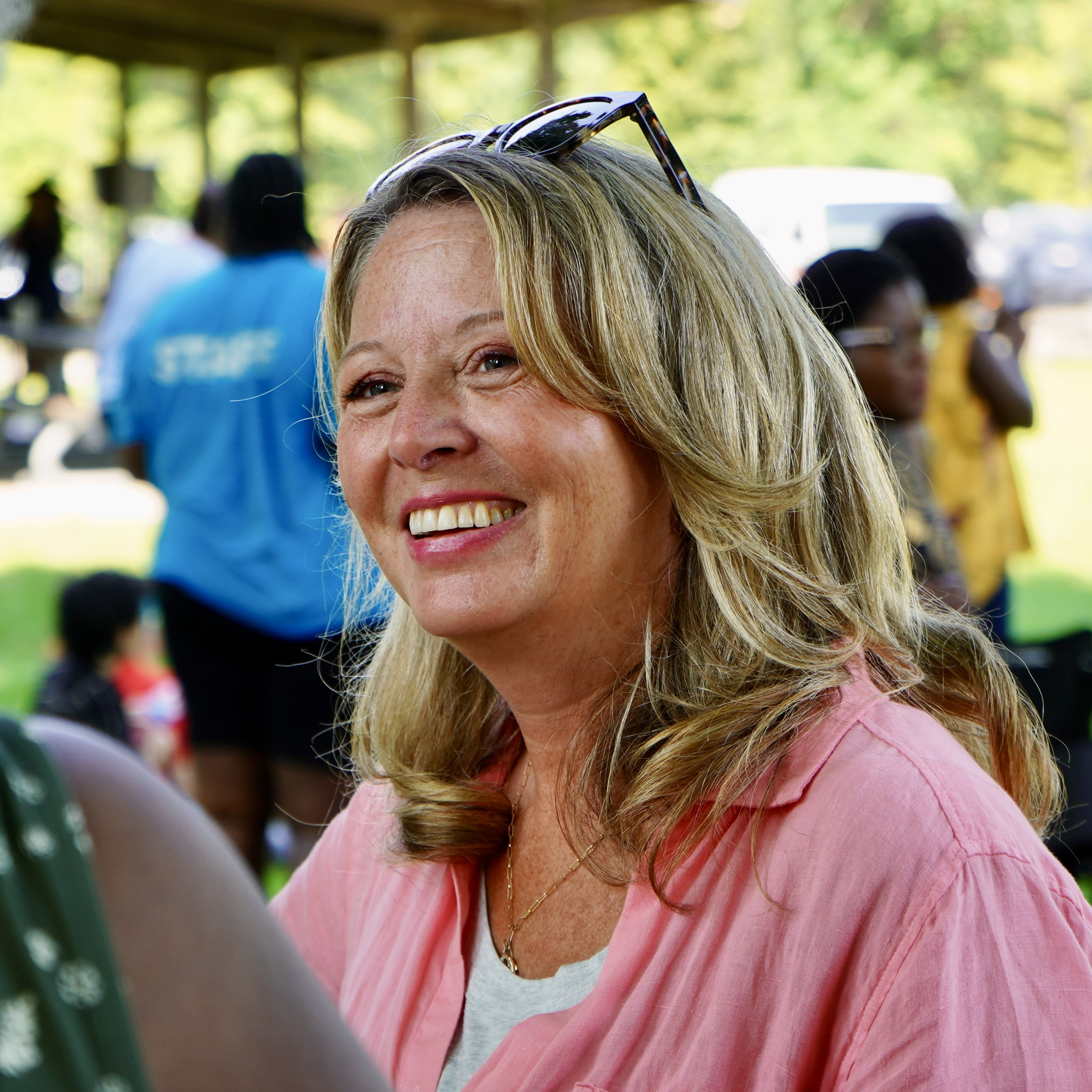
Stiles at an Emancipation Day event in Cambridge, Ontario, July 2024

In October 2023, Hamilton Centre MPP Sarah Jama was removed from the NDP caucus for allegedly failing to abide by the terms of an agreement between herself and Stiles. Jama was accused of taking a "number of unilateral actions" without party endorsement, which included making statements regarding the Gaza war; being uncooperative with NDP colleagues; and threatening Premier Doug Ford with legal action without first consulting her caucus. Stiles had originally defended Jama, and had met privately with Jama beforehand, asking her to remove her statement and apologize. Jama subsequently apologized for her posts but, in defiance of the party's directive, refused to remove the statement, instead pinning it to the top of her feed on X. Jama said: "I don't plan on apologizing..." The NDP was divided over the issue. Some in the NDP stated that Jama should have been ejected sooner for refusing to remove her statement; some were critical of the political damage that resulted from the delay in expelling Jama with one MPP having to be convinced not to quit the NDP over the delay; while others criticized Stiles for her decision to remove Jama from caucus including two constituency associations that demanded Stiles resign as leader. In January 2025, Jama was initially told she would be allowed to run for the NDP nomination in her riding, but then was barred by the party and forced to run as an independent.

Stiles led the party into the snap 2025 Ontario general election, winning 27 seats and forming the Official Opposition for the third consecutive time, a first in party history. However, the party's vote share slipped below 20 per cent. Following the election, Stiles began a tour of the province during the summer months of 2025. On September 20, 2025, Stiles received 68 percent support in a leadership review vote during the party's provincial convention.

On November 19, 2025, Stiles was ejected from the Legislative Assembly during question period, after she described Doug Ford's government as "corrupt," while criticizing them for the Skills Development Fund scandal. In January 2026, Scarborough Southwest MPP and the party's deputy leader Doly Begum resigned her seat to run for the federal Liberals in a by-election; the party held the seat in the 2026 Scarborough Southwest provincial by-election.

== Personal life ==
Stiles lives in Toronto, Ontario, with her husband Jordan Berger and their two daughters. Berger ran unsuccessfully for the NDP in Davenport in 2003, losing to the Liberal incumbent Tony Ruprecht. She has a younger sister named Enid who is a veterinarian near Montreal.

== Electoral record ==
=== Provincial elections ===
2025 Ontario general election: Davenport
Party	Candidate	Votes	%	±%	Expenditures
New Democratic	Marit Stiles	22,143	57.07	+0.00	$82,899
Liberal	Paulo Pereira	7,983	20.57	+1.36	$34,082
Progressive Conservative	Nick Pavlov	6,937	17.88	+3.80	$1,103
Green	Randi Ramdeen	1,184	3.05	–1.77	$0
Communist	Dave McKee	556	1.43	+0.51	$0
Total valid votes/expense limit		38,803	99.30	–	$136,245
Total rejected, unmarked and declined ballots		273	0.70	–0.06	
Turnout		39,076	46.18	+2.87	
Eligible voters		84,624			
New Democratic hold		Swing		–0.68	
Source: Elections Ontario

2022 Ontario general election: Davenport
Party	Candidate	Votes	%	±%	Expenditures
New Democratic	Marit Stiles	20,242	57.06	–3.20	$107,755
Liberal	Jerry Levitan	6,815	19.21	+0.53	$67,441
Progressive Conservative	Paul Spence	4,994	14.08	–2.01	$6,103
Green	Karen Stephenson	1,710	4.82	+1.28	$542
Ontario Party	Diti Coutinho	400	1.13	–	$4,541
New Blue	Mario Bilusic	395	1.11	–	$2,719
Libertarian	Nunzio Venuto	375	1.06	+0.60	$0
Communist	Jack Copple	326	0.92	+0.59	$0
Independent	Nicholas Alexander	139	0.39	–	$550
Independent	Simon Fogel	77	0.22	–	$300
Total valid votes/expense limit		35,473	99.24	–	$117,313
Total rejected, unmarked and declined ballots		272	0.76	–0.25	
Turnout		35,745	43.30	–12.52	
Eligible voters		82,547			
New Democratic hold		Swing		▼1.87	
Source: Elections Ontario

2018 Ontario general election: Davenport
Party	Candidate	Votes	%	±%
New Democratic	Marit Stiles	27,613	60.27	+20.12
Liberal	Cristina Martins	8,558	18.68	–26.94
Progressive Conservative	Federico Sanchez	7,370	16.09	+8.61
Green	Kirsten Snider	1,624	3.54	–1.46
Libertarian	Nunzio Venuto	210	0.46	–0.24
Communist	Dave McKee	152	0.33	–0.15
Freedom	Franz Cauchi	127	0.28	–0.03
People's Political Party	Troy Young	96	0.21	–0.07
No Affiliation	Chai Kalevar	69	0.15	–
Total valid votes		45,819	98.98	
Total rejected, unmarked and declined ballots		470	1.02	–0.18
Turnout		46,289	55.82	+6.26
Eligible voters		82,924		
New Democratic gain from Liberal		Swing		+23.53
Source: Elections Ontario

=== Municipal elections ===
2014 Toronto District School Board Trustee election: Ward 9
Candidate	Votes	%
Marit Stiles	8,467	54.59
Sandra Martins	3,906	25.19
Jacqueline McKenzie	3,202	20.65
Liz Jackson	2,201	14.19
Mary MacNeill	1,493	9.63
Marjolein Winterink	1,448	9.34
Dean Eyford	930	6.00
Kowser Omer Hashi	868	5.60
