= 2011 Ontario general election =

Canadian provincial election

- October 6, 2011

107 seats in the 40th Legislative Assembly of Ontario 54 seats needed for a majority
- Opinion polls
- Turnout: 48.2% (▼4.6pp)
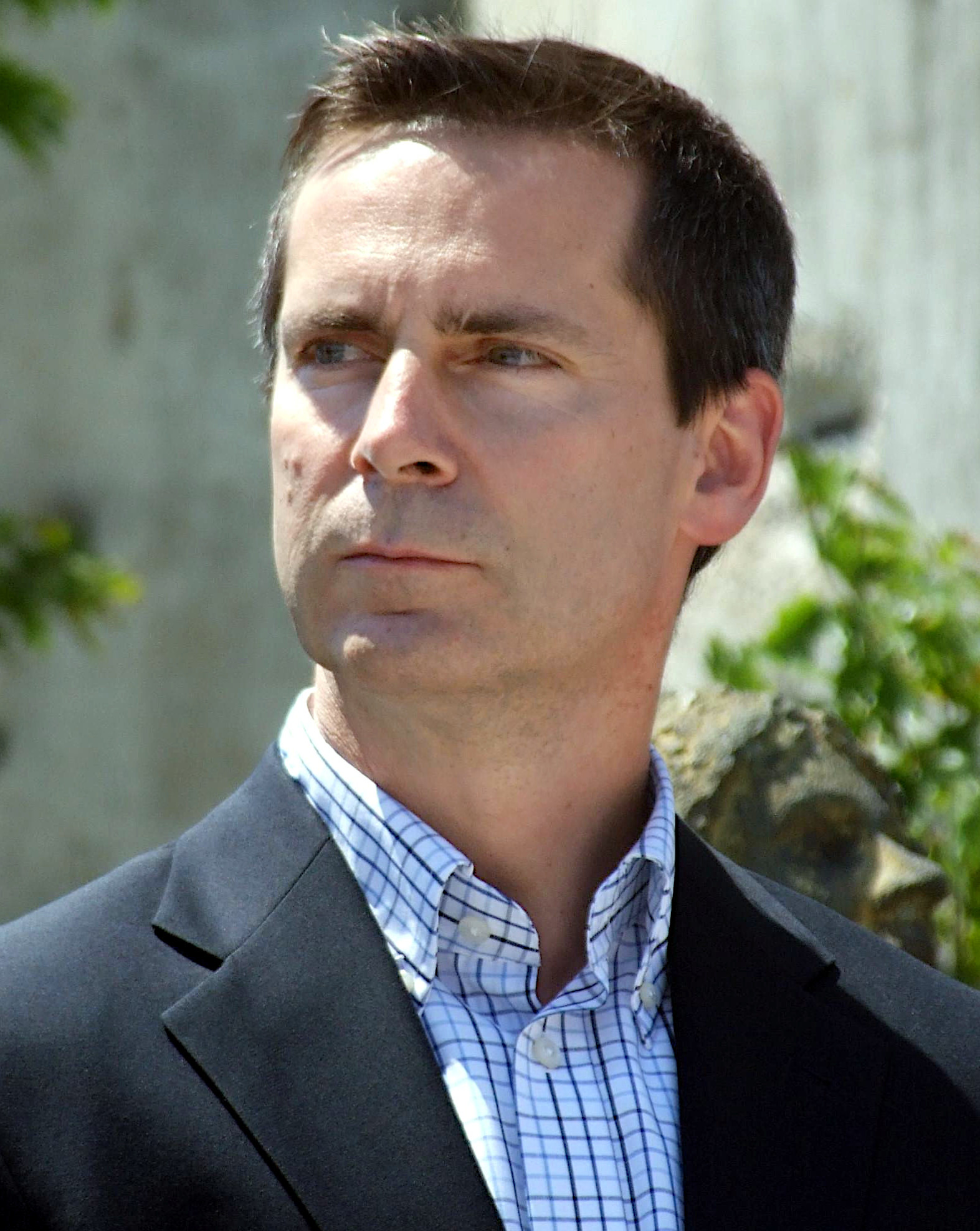

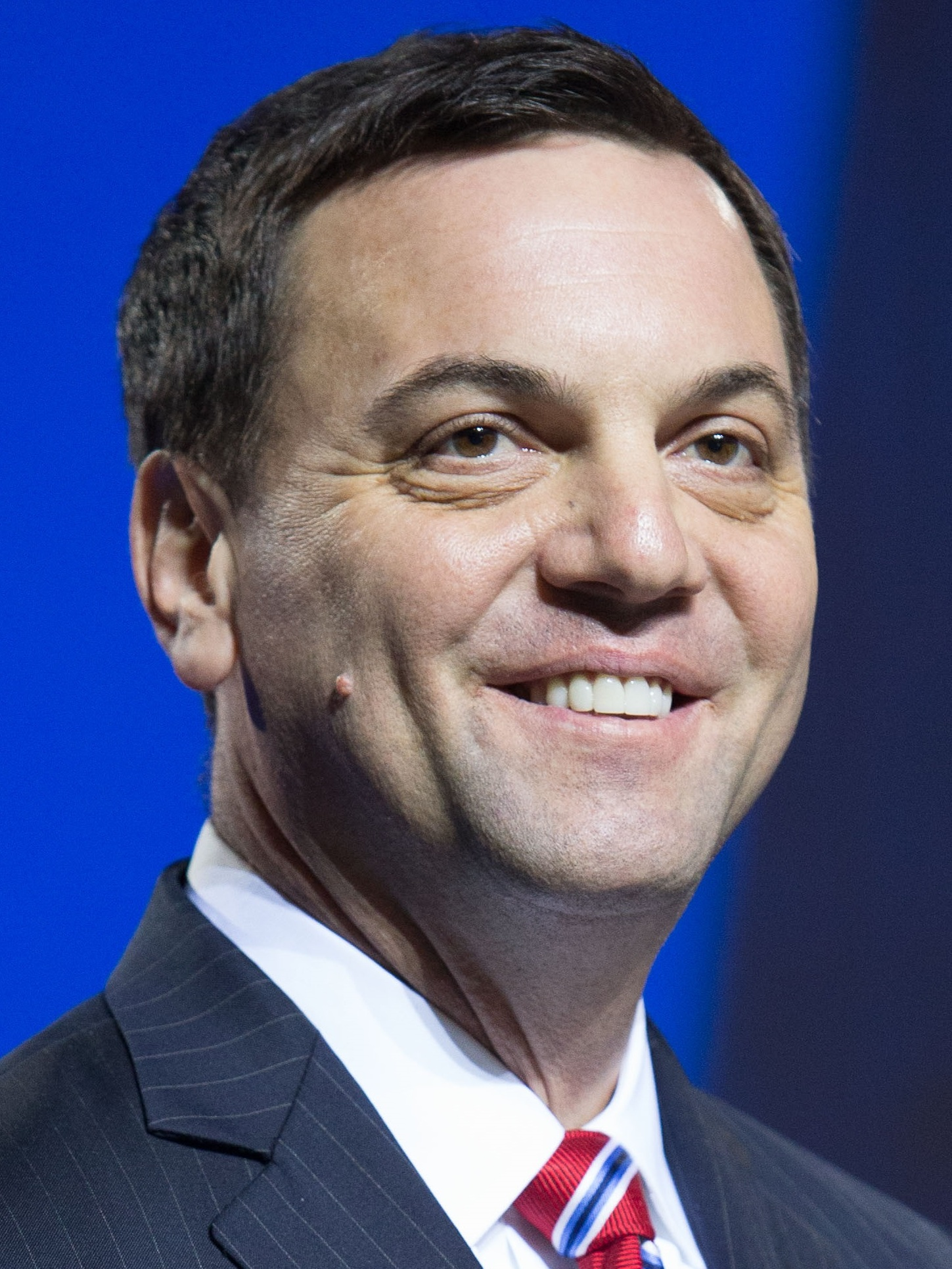

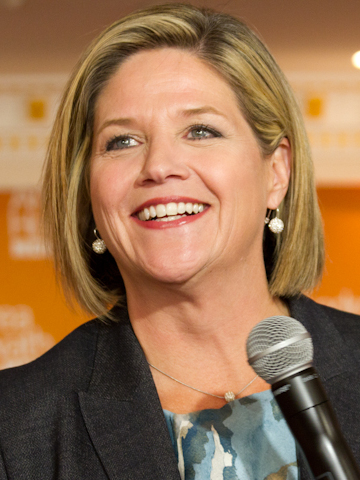
	First party	Second party	Third party
Leader	Dalton McGuinty	Tim Hudak	Andrea Horwath
Party	Liberal	Progressive Conservative	New Democratic
Leader since	December 1, 1996	June 27, 2009	March 7, 2009
Leader's seat	Ottawa South	Niagara West—Glanbrook	Hamilton Centre
Last election	71 seats, 42.25%	26 seats, 31.62%	10 seats, 16.76%
Seats before	70	25	10
Seats won	53	37	17
Seat change	▼17	▲12	▲7
Popular vote	1,625,102	1,530,076	981,508
Percentage	37.65%	35.45%	22.74%
Swing	▼4.60pp	▲3.83pp	▲5.98pp
- Popular vote by riding. As this is an FPTP election, seat totals are not determined by popular vote, but instead via results by each riding. Riding names are listed at the bottom.
Premier before election
Dalton McGuinty
Liberal
Premier after election
Dalton McGuinty
Liberal

General elections were held on October 6, 2011, to elect members of the 40th Legislative Assembly of Ontario. The Ontario Liberal Party was elected to a minority government, with the Progressive Conservative Party of Ontario (PC Party) serving as the Official Opposition and the Ontario New Democratic Party (NDP) serving as the third party. In the final result, Premier McGuinty's party fell one seat short of winning a majority government.

Under amendments passed by the Legislature in December 2005, Ontario elections were now held on fixed dates, namely the first Thursday of October every four years. The writ of election was issued by Lieutenant Governor David Onley on September 7, 2011.

The election saw a then–record low voter turnout of 48.2%, only to be surpassed by the 2022 Ontario general election with 44.06%.

== Timeline ==
2007

- October 10, 2007: Elections held for members of the Ontario Legislature in the 39th Legislative Assembly of Ontario.
- November 29, 2007: The 39th Legislative Assembly of Ontario officially opens with the Speech from the Throne.

2008

- February 23, 2008: John Tory's continued leadership of the Progressive Conservative party is endorsed by 66.9% of delegates at a leadership review.
- June 14, 2008: Premier Dalton McGuinty receives the support of 95.4% of delegates from the Ontario Liberal Party's mandatory leadership review.
- June 14, 2008: NDP leader Howard Hampton announces he will be stepping down as party leader at the March 7, 2009 NDP leadership convention.

2009

- January 9, 2009: Progressive Conservative MPP Laurie Scott announces her resignation from the legislature to allow party leader John Tory, who has been without a seat since his defeat in Don Valley West in the 2007 election, to re-enter the legislature.
- March 5, 2009: In the Haliburton—Kawartha Lakes—Brock by-election following Scott's resignation, Tory is defeated by Liberal candidate Rick Johnson.
- March 6, 2009: John Tory resigns as Progressive Conservative leader pending the selection of an interim party leader.
- March 7, 2009: Andrea Horwath is elected leader of the Ontario NDP at the party's 2009 leadership convention.
- June 27, 2009: Tim Hudak is elected leader of the Progressive Conservative party at its 2009 leadership election and also becomes the new Leader of the Opposition.
- September 17, 2009: Eric Hoskins is elected as the MPP for the riding of St. Paul's following the resignation of Michael Bryant on June 7, 2009.
- November 4, 2009: Mike Schreiner is affirmed as the new leader of the Green Party of Ontario, receiving 97% approval from the party membership defeating the None of the Above ballot option, in the 2009 leadership election.

2010

- January 29, 2010: Bob Runciman resigns his seat to accept appointment to the Senate of Canada.
- February 1, 2010: Jim Watson resigns his seat to run for Mayor in the 2010 Ottawa municipal election
- February 4, 2010: Glen Murray is elected as the MPP for the riding of Toronto Centre following the resignation of George Smitherman on January 4, 2010.
- March 4, 2010: Bob Chiarelli is elected as the MPP for the riding of Ottawa West—Nepean and Steve Clark is elected as the MPP for the riding of Leeds—Grenville.
- December 16, 2010: Peter Fonseca resigned from cabinet to run for the federal Liberals in the riding of Mississauga East—Cooksville in the 2011 federal election.

2011

- June 3, 2011: Essex MPP Bruce Crozier dies of an aortic aneurysm.
- September 7, 2011: Official election call, Premier McGuinty formally asks the Lt. Governor to dissolve the legislature. The campaign will be 29 days long.
- September 21–30, 2011: Advance polling stations open for early voting from 10:00 a.m. until 8:00 p.m.
- September 27, 2011: The televised Leaders debate aired on CBC, CHCH, CTV, Global, TVOntario and Sun News Network, with Liberal leader and Premier Dalton McGuinty, Progressive Conservative leader Tim Hudak and New Democratic Party leader Andrea Horwath.
- October 6, 2011: Ontario general election from 9:00 a.m. until 9:00 p.m. EDT (8:00 a.m. to 8:00 p.m. CDT in north-western part of the province).

=== Party leadership ===
In March 2009, PC Party leader John Tory stepped down as leader, with Tim Hudak elected to be his successor. Also in March 2009, Andrea Horwath replaced Howard Hampton as leader of the NDP at the leadership election. Thus, both the Progressive Conservatives and the NDP went into the election with a new leader. Green Party of Ontario leader Frank de Jong stepped down in November 2009; their leadership convention confirmed Mike Schreiner as their new leader. Dalton McGuinty won 95 per cent support for his leadership at an Ontario Liberal annual general meeting after the 2007 election, and ran again in 2011.

== Campaign ==
=== Contests ===
Candidate contests in the ridings
Candidates nominated	Ridings	Party										
Candidates nominated	Ridings	Lib	PC	NDP	Green	Free	Ltn	Ind	FCP	Comm	Oth (Note: Minor political parties fielding fewer than nine candidates are aggregated together.)	Totals
4	12	12	12	12	12							48
5	30	30	30	30	30	9	9	1	7		4	150
6	25	25	25	25	25	18	14	8	4		6	150
7	24	24	24	24	24	18	16	15	12	3	8	168
8	8	8	8	8	8	5	5	3	5	3	11	64
9	5	5	5	5	5	5	4	4	2	1	9	45
10	3	3	3	3	3	2	3	5	1	2	5	30
Total	107	107	107	107	107	57	51	36	31	9	43	655

=== Incumbents not running for reelection ===
Electoral district	Incumbent at dissolution and subsequent nominee		New MPP
Barrie	Aileen Carroll	Karl Walsh	Rod Jackson
Bruce—Grey—Owen Sound	Bill Murdoch	Bill Walker	Bill Walker
Burlington	Joyce Savoline	Jane McKenna	Jane McKenna
Cambridge	Gerry Martiniuk	Rob Leone	Rob Leone
Carleton—Mississippi Mills	Norm Sterling	Jack MacLaren	Jack MacLaren
Chatham-Kent—Essex	Pat Hoy	Paul Watson	Rick Nicholls
Davenport	Tony Ruprecht	Cristina Martins	Jonah Schein
Don Valley East	David Caplan	Michael Coteau	Michael Coteau
Elgin—Middlesex—London	Steve Peters	Lori Baldwin-Sands	Jeff Yurek
Glengarry—Prescott—Russell	Jean-Marc Lalonde	Grant Crack	Grant Crack
Kenora—Rainy River	Howard Hampton	Sarah Campbell	Sarah Campbell
Nipissing	Monique Smith	Catherine Whiting	Vic Fedeli
Pickering—Scarborough East	Wayne Arthurs	Tracy MacCharles	Tracy MacCharles
Scarborough—Agincourt	Gerry Phillips	Soo Wong	Soo Wong
Stormont—Dundas—South Glengarry	Jim Brownell	Mark A. Macdonald	Jim McDonell
Timiskaming—Cochrane	David Ramsay	Denis Bonin	John Vanthof
Welland	Peter Kormos	Cindy Forster	Cindy Forster
Windsor West	Sandra Pupatello	Teresa Piruzza	Teresa Piruzza

== Results ==
Summary of the Legislative Assembly of Ontario election results
Party	Party leader	Candidates	Seats				Popular vote		
Party	Party leader	Candidates	2007	Dissol.	2011	Change	#	%	Change
Liberal	Dalton McGuinty	107	71	70	53	18▼	1,625,102	37.65%	4.7%▼
Progressive Conservative	Tim Hudak	107	26	25	37	11▲	1,530,076	35.45%	3.8%▲
New Democratic	Andrea Horwath	107	10	10	17	7▲	981,508	22.74%	5.9%▲
Green	Mike Schreiner	107	–	–	–	–	126,021	2.92%	5.1%▼
Libertarian	Sam Apelbaum	51	–	–	–	–	19,447	0.45%	0.3%▲
Family Coalition	Phil Lees	31	–	–	–	–	9,524	0.22%	0.6%▼
Freedom	Paul McKeever	57	–	–	–	–	9,253	0.21%	0.1%▲
Independent		36	–	–	–	–	9,021	0.21%	–
Communist	Elizabeth Rowley	9	–	–	–	–	1,162	0.03%	0.01%▼
Northern Ontario Heritage	Edward Deibel	3	–	–	–	–	676	0.02%	–
Special Needs	Danish Ahmed	4	–	–	–	–	667	0.02%	0.01%▲
Reform	Bradley J. Harness	4	–	–	–	–	647	0.01%	0.01%▲
Paramount Canadians	Ranvir Dogra	4	–	–	–	–	562	0.01%	–
Confederation of Regions	vacant	3	–	–	–	–	559	0.01%	–
Socialist	Michael Laxer	5	–	–	–	–	519	0.01%	–
People's Political Party	Kevin Clarke	4	–	–	–	–	386	–	–
Vegan Environmental	Paul Figueiras	3	–	–	–	–	366	–	–
Republican	Trueman Tuck	3	–	–	–	–	232	–	–
The Only Party	Michael Green	3	–	–	–	–	188	–	–
Human Rights	Marilyn McCormick	2	–	–	–	–	170	–	–
Canadians' Choice	Bahman Yazdanfar	3	–	–	–	–	156	–	–
Paupers	John Turmel	2	–	–	–	–	140	< .01%	–
Vacant				2					
Total		655	107	107	107		4,316,382	100%	
Source: "40TH GENERAL ELECTION - SUMMARY OF VALID BALLOTS CAST" (PDF). Elections Ontario. Archived from the original (PDF) on May 1, 2014.

=== Vote and seat summaries ===
Ternary plots - shift of electoral support (2007-2011)
2007

2011
Electoral districts identified by colours of winning parties

Popular vote
Liberal	37.65%
PC	35.45%
New Democratic	22.74%
Others	4.16%

Seats summary
Liberal	49.53%
PC	34.58%
New Democratic	15.89%

=== Summary ===
Elections to the Legislative Assembly of Ontario - seats won/lost by party, 2007-2011
Party	2007	Gain from(loss to)			2011
Party	2007	Lib	PC	NDP	2011
Liberal	71		(11)	(7)	53
Progressive Conservative	26	11			37
New Democratic	10	7			17
Total	107	18	(11)	(7)	107

=== Regional analysis ===
Elections to the Legislative Assembly of Ontario - seats won by region (2011)
Party	Toronto	905 Belt	Ham/Niagara	Central	East	Midwest	Southwest	North	Total
Liberal	17	14	3	1	7	3	4	4	53
Conservative		3	3	10	7	8	4	2	37
New Democratic	5	1	4				2	5	17
Total	22	18	10	11	14	11	10	11	107

=== Synopsis of results ===
Results by riding - 2011 Ontario general election (Note: "2011 Ontario General Election". elections.on.ca. Elections Ontario. Error in EO report re Willowdale corrected: "Alexander Brown for Willowdale". willowdalendp.ca. November 7, 2011. Archived from the original on November 7, 2011.)
Riding	Winning party							Turnout (Note: including spoilt ballots)	Votes (Note: minor political parties receiving less than 1% of the popular vote are aggregated under "Other"; independent candidates are aggregated separately)						
Riding	2007	1st place	Votes	Share	Margin #	Margin %	2nd place	Turnout	Lib	PC	NDP	Green	Ind	Other	Total
Ajax—Pickering	Lib	Lib	19,606	47.34%	4,888	11.80%	PC	44.84%	19,606	14,718	5,952	843	–	299	41,418
Algoma—Manitoulin	Lib	NDP	11,585	44.52%	4,188	16.09%	Lib	49.43%	7,397	6,141	11,585	684	–	217	26,024
Ancaster—Dundas—Flamborough—Westdale	Lib	Lib	21,648	43.70%	4,516	9.12%	PC	56.45%	21,648	17,132	8,521	1,477	–	765	49,543
Barrie	Lib	PC	17,527	40.66%	2,521	5.85%	Lib	46.00%	15,006	17,527	8,171	1,909	–	497	43,110
Beaches—East York	NDP	NDP	17,925	46.82%	4,112	10.74%	Lib	51.64%	13,813	5,333	17,925	1,025	–	189	38,285
Bramalea—Gore—Malton	Lib	NDP	16,626	38.16%	2,277	5.23%	Lib	40.71%	14,349	9,896	16,626	1,091	491	1,119	43,572
Brampton—Springdale	Lib	Lib	15,663	44.43%	2,909	8.25%	PC	40.54%	15,663	12,754	5,378	900	–	562	35,257
Brampton West	Lib	Lib	19,224	43.76%	4,790	10.90%	PC	38.29%	19,224	14,434	8,331	1,432	–	509	43,930
Brant	Lib	Lib	16,867	37.08%	1,106	2.43%	PC	48.23%	16,867	15,761	11,006	957	244	649	45,484
Bruce—Grey—Owen Sound	PC	PC	19,567	47.37%	8,678	21.01%	Lib	54.70%	10,889	19,567	6,133	2,654	1,478	585	41,306
Burlington	PC	PC	20,061	40.41%	2,152	4.33%	Lib	54.83%	17,909	20,061	9,370	1,129	–	1,175	49,644
Cambridge	PC	PC	15,947	37.69%	1,954	4.62%	Lib	46.04%	13,993	15,947	10,414	1,056	271	629	42,310
Carleton—Mississippi Mills	PC	PC	28,246	50.29%	9,102	16.21%	Lib	53.50%	19,144	28,246	6,371	1,857	–	549	56,167
Chatham-Kent—Essex	Lib	PC	15,121	41.78%	3,490	9.64%	Lib	49.41%	11,631	15,121	8,415	1,027	–	–	36,194
Davenport	Lib	NDP	14,367	45.93%	1,414	4.52%	Lib	45.59%	12,953	2,480	14,367	855	250	374	31,279
Don Valley East	Lib	Lib	16,350	51.08%	7,645	23.88%	PC	46.08%	16,350	8,705	5,953	702	–	300	32,010
Don Valley West	Lib	Lib	24,444	58.32%	11,617	27.71%	PC	50.93%	24,444	12,827	3,621	718	–	307	41,917
Dufferin—Caledon	PC	PC	17,833	46.95%	7,671	20.19%	Lib	47.74%	10,162	17,833	4,200	5,540	–	250	37,985
Durham	PC	PC	22,393	49.07%	8,999	19.72%	Lib	49.74%	13,394	22,393	8,027	1,221	–	596	45,631
Eglinton—Lawrence	Lib	Lib	20,752	54.15%	7,895	20.60%	PC	51.81%	20,752	12,857	3,763	575	146	231	38,324
Elgin—Middlesex—London	Lib	PC	19,771	47.86%	8,696	21.05%	Lib	51.28%	11,075	19,771	9,201	981	–	283	41,311
Essex	Lib	NDP	17,417	37.99%	1,368	2.98%	PC	51.38%	11,518	16,049	17,417	860	–	–	45,844
Etobicoke Centre	Lib	Lib	21,916	51.48%	7,960	18.70%	PC	52.62%	21,916	13,956	5,099	837	–	761	42,569
Etobicoke—Lakeshore	Lib	Lib	22,169	51.02%	9,464	21.78%	PC	50.01%	22,169	12,705	6,713	1,164	226	471	43,448
Etobicoke North	Lib	Lib	12,081	48.46%	6,009	24.10%	PC	40.15%	12,081	6,072	5,426	541	–	811	24,931
Glengarry—Prescott—Russell	Lib	Lib	17,345	43.18%	1,372	3.42%	PC	47.81%	17,345	15,973	5,721	770	–	363	40,172
Guelph	Lib	Lib	19,815	42.43%	7,861	16.83%	PC	50.27%	19,815	11,954	11,150	3,234	100	444	46,697
Haldimand—Norfolk	PC	PC	25,203	60.81%	17,155	41.39%	NDP	53.31%	7,087	25,203	8,048	868	–	242	41,448
Haliburton—Kawartha Lakes—Brock	PC	PC	22,352	45.43%	5,830	11.85%	Lib	54.98%	16,522	22,352	8,517	1,562	–	245	49,198
Halton	PC	PC	26,228	44.47%	3,148	5.34%	Lib	45.99%	23,080	26,228	7,757	1,286	166	464	58,981
Hamilton Centre	NDP	NDP	20,586	61.33%	14,725	43.87%	Lib	42.43%	5,861	4,421	20,586	1,249	268	1,182	33,567
Hamilton East—Stoney Creek	NDP	NDP	20,442	51.72%	10,045	25.41%	Lib	46.26%	10,397	7,395	20,442	692	–	601	39,527
Hamilton Mountain	Lib	NDP	20,492	45.16%	5,798	12.78%	Lib	50.45%	14,694	8,641	20,492	748	–	798	45,373
Huron—Bruce	Lib	PC	19,138	42.76%	4,479	10.01%	Lib	59.23%	14,659	19,138	9,329	772	200	656	44,754
Kenora—Rainy River	NDP	NDP	10,949	49.62%	2,642	11.97%	PC	45.75%	2,202	8,307	10,949	391	–	216	22,065
Kingston and the Islands	Lib	Lib	21,028	48.84%	10,787	25.06%	NDP	45.03%	21,028	9,610	10,241	1,594	–	578	43,051
Kitchener Centre	Lib	Lib	15,392	39.23%	323	0.82%	PC	49.16%	15,392	15,069	7,385	938	137	317	39,238
Kitchener—Conestoga	Lib	PC	18,017	44.18%	3,541	8.68%	Lib	46.62%	14,476	18,017	7,165	1,121	–	–	40,779
Kitchener—Waterloo	PC	PC	21,665	43.77%	3,828	7.73%	Lib	50.54%	17,837	21,665	8,250	1,308	316	123	49,499
Lambton—Kent—Middlesex	Lib	PC	19,379	45.74%	6,956	16.42%	Lib	54.08%	12,423	19,379	8,882	987	–	701	42,372
Lanark—Frontenac—Lennox and Addington	PC	PC	22,457	50.12%	9,967	22.25%	Lib	50.43%	12,490	22,457	8,104	1,754	–	–	44,805
Leeds—Grenville	PC	PC	24,314	63.60%	17,651	46.17%	Lib	50.64%	6,663	24,314	5,822	1,319	–	111	38,229
London—Fanshawe	Lib	NDP	13,953	40.77%	4,275	12.49%	Lib	45.82%	9,678	9,075	13,953	852	192	475	34,225
London North Centre	Lib	Lib	19,167	43.91%	6,539	14.98%	PC	47.87%	19,167	12,628	9,914	1,451	–	492	43,652
London West	Lib	Lib	22,610	45.65%	8,007	16.17%	PC	53.01%	22,610	14,603	10,757	1,194	–	361	49,525
Markham—Unionville	Lib	Lib	19,579	52.58%	7,859	21.11%	PC	40.68%	19,579	11,720	4,575	1,104	–	259	37,237
Mississauga—Brampton South	Lib	Lib	15,579	46.04%	5,292	15.64%	PC	36.43%	15,579	10,287	5,420	1,247	616	691	33,840
Mississauga East—Cooksville	Lib	Lib	15,535	45.74%	4,238	12.48%	PC	40.50%	15,535	11,297	5,704	934	199	294	33,963
Mississauga—Erindale	Lib	Lib	20,552	45.03%	4,258	9.33%	PC	43.91%	20,552	16,294	7,768	853	–	176	45,643
Mississauga South	Lib	Lib	20,375	50.71%	5,876	14.62%	PC	51.25%	20,375	14,499	4,044	860	–	401	40,179
Mississauga—Streetsville	Lib	Lib	18,591	51.54%	7,936	22.00%	PC	41.46%	18,591	10,655	5,494	1,329	–	0	36,069
Nepean—Carleton	PC	PC	29,985	54.48%	15,141	27.51%	Lib	49.91%	14,844	29,985	8,127	1,641	–	440	55,037
Newmarket—Aurora	PC	PC	21,425	47.24%	5,271	11.62%	Lib	49.33%	16,154	21,425	6,514	1,256	–	–	45,349
Niagara Falls	Lib	Lib	16,794	35.89%	498	1.06%	PC	49.44%	16,794	16,296	12,304	759	231	408	46,792
Niagara West—Glanbrook	PC	PC	24,919	50.95%	12,211	24.97%	Lib	54.88%	12,708	24,919	9,070	1,372	–	837	48,906
Nickel Belt	NDP	NDP	16,876	54.86%	9,425	30.64%	Lib	49.55%	7,451	5,625	16,876	810	–	–	30,762
Nipissing	Lib	PC	15,381	50.11%	6,606	21.52%	Lib	51.86%	8,775	15,381	5,567	971	–	–	30,694
Northumberland—Quinte West	Lib	PC	19,279	39.80%	707	1.46%	Lib	51.88%	18,572	19,279	8,589	1,483	159	357	48,439
Oak Ridges—Markham	Lib	Lib	28,878	44.78%	4,928	7.64%	PC	42.70%	28,878	23,950	8,548	1,569	484	1,057	64,486
Oakville	Lib	Lib	21,711	48.09%	4,580	10.14%	PC	52.70%	21,711	17,131	4,625	878	498	303	45,146
Oshawa	PC	PC	16,719	42.25%	2,403	6.07%	NDP	44.26%	6,921	16,719	14,316	1,035	–	582	39,573
Ottawa Centre	Lib	Lib	23,646	46.81%	8,931	17.68%	NDP	53.73%	23,646	9,257	14,715	2,184	309	400	50,511
Ottawa—Orléans	Lib	Lib	21,857	46.44%	2,854	6.06%	PC	52.65%	21,857	19,003	4,979	886	–	337	47,062
Ottawa South	Lib	Lib	21,842	48.86%	6,897	15.43%	PC	51.19%	21,842	14,945	5,988	1,442	–	490	44,707
Ottawa—Vanier	Lib	Lib	19,619	51.51%	10,690	28.07%	PC	46.81%	19,619	8,929	7,466	1,719	–	352	38,085
Ottawa West—Nepean	Lib	Lib	18,492	41.62%	1,009	2.27%	PC	54.02%	18,492	17,483	6,576	1,485	–	396	44,432
Oxford	PC	PC	20,658	54.87%	11,248	29.88%	Lib	49.18%	9,410	20,658	5,885	1,336	–	359	37,648
Parkdale—High Park	NDP	NDP	18,365	46.20%	3,488	8.77%	Lib	51.79%	14,877	4,668	18,365	1,325	289	228	39,752
Parry Sound—Muskoka	PC	PC	19,417	54.09%	12,880	35.88%	Lib	51.79%	6,537	19,417	6,527	3,251	–	167	35,899
Perth—Wellington	Lib	PC	14,845	40.09%	210	0.57%	Lib	51.89%	14,635	14,845	5,836	918	–	791	37,025
Peterborough	Lib	Lib	19,430	39.93%	4,107	8.44%	PC	53.18%	19,430	15,323	12,460	1,235	–	210	48,658
Pickering—Scarborough East	Lib	Lib	18,201	46.66%	5,168	13.25%	PC	49.69%	18,201	13,033	6,424	1,096	–	252	39,006
Prince Edward—Hastings	Lib	PC	18,816	42.28%	3,130	7.03%	Lib	51.74%	15,686	18,816	7,379	2,049	–	573	44,503
Renfrew—Nipissing—Pembroke	PC	PC	27,594	70.78%	21,363	54.80%	Lib	52.69%	6,231	27,594	4,277	574	–	309	38,985
Richmond Hill	Lib	Lib	18,042	46.92%	4,279	11.13%	PC	42.49%	18,042	13,763	4,987	1,268	–	394	38,454
St. Catharines	Lib	Lib	17,166	40.21%	1,705	3.99%	PC	51.00%	17,166	15,461	8,624	1,066	–	378	42,695
St. Paul's	Lib	Lib	25,048	58.39%	16,076	37.48%	PC	50.41%	25,048	8,972	7,124	1,180	–	573	42,897
Sarnia—Lambton	PC	PC	19,570	48.32%	9,263	22.87%	NDP	51.75%	8,819	19,570	10,307	567	1,077	160	40,500
Sault Ste. Marie	Lib	Lib	16,109	54.95%	7,072	24.12%	NDP	49.35%	16,109	3,477	9,037	519	–	172	29,314
Scarborough—Agincourt	Lib	Lib	14,907	46.85%	4,685	14.73%	PC	43.57%	14,907	10,222	5,017	722	–	948	31,816
Scarborough Centre	Lib	Lib	16,142	51.43%	8,631	27.50%	PC	44.49%	16,142	7,511	6,876	558	–	301	31,388
Scarborough—Guildwood	Lib	Lib	15,607	48.93%	6,470	20.29%	PC	47.65%	15,607	9,137	6,194	413	–	543	31,894
Scarborough—Rouge River	Lib	Lib	15,237	41.87%	2,149	5.91%	NDP	42.89%	15,237	6,837	13,088	455	–	773	36,390
Scarborough Southwest	Lib	Lib	14,585	44.09%	4,181	12.64%	NDP	47.78%	14,585	7,061	10,404	777	–	250	33,077
Simcoe—Grey	PC	PC	25,339	54.33%	14,935	32.02%	Lib	48.12%	10,404	25,339	6,839	4,057	–	–	46,639
Simcoe North	PC	PC	25,081	55.16%	14,890	32.75%	Lib	50.98%	10,191	25,081	7,710	2,488	–	–	45,470
Stormont—Dundas—South Glengarry	Lib	PC	21,463	55.25%	13,050	33.60%	Lib	51.40%	8,413	21,463	8,021	551	–	396	38,844
Sudbury	Lib	Lib	13,735	42.37%	531	1.64%	NDP	49.94%	13,735	4,400	13,204	870	44	164	32,417
Thornhill	PC	PC	20,971	46.71%	2,598	5.79%	Lib	45.35%	18,373	20,971	4,024	756	–	772	44,896
Thunder Bay—Atikokan	Lib	Lib	10,319	38.97%	438	1.65%	NDP	46.61%	10,319	5,815	9,881	379	86	–	26,480
Thunder Bay—Superior North	Lib	Lib	11,765	45.00%	2,654	10.15%	NDP	48.20%	11,765	4,578	9,111	555	–	133	26,142
Timiskaming—Cochrane	Lib	NDP	12,633	50.12%	6,101	24.21%	Lib	50.01%	6,532	5,337	12,633	312	–	391	25,205
Timmins—James Bay	NDP	NDP	11,479	49.47%	2,964	12.77%	PC	46.84%	2,870	8,515	11,479	233	–	108	23,205
Toronto Centre	Lib	Lib	25,236	54.94%	13,665	29.75%	NDP	48.42%	25,236	7,186	11,571	1,123	–	820	45,936
Toronto—Danforth	NDP	NDP	20,062	54.01%	8,693	23.40%	Lib	49.30%	11,369	3,488	20,062	1,354	–	875	37,148
Trinity—Spadina	NDP	NDP	19,870	42.36%	1,139	2.43%	Lib	43.00%	18,731	5,420	19,870	2,415	–	470	46,906
Vaughan	Lib	Lib	26,174	53.02%	10,754	21.78%	PC	41.08%	26,174	15,420	5,594	694	169	1,316	49,367
Welland	NDP	NDP	19,527	44.66%	5,479	12.53%	PC	51.64%	8,638	14,048	19,527	1,005	–	505	43,723
Wellington—Halton Hills	PC	PC	23,495	55.62%	12,161	28.79%	Lib	51.11%	11,334	23,495	6,106	1,309	–	–	42,244
Whitby—Oshawa	PC	PC	24,499	48.17%	7,511	14.77%	Lib	49.69%	16,988	24,499	7,865	1,139	–	371	50,862
Willowdale	Lib	Lib	21,984	50.84%	7,456	17.24%	PC	45.40%	21,984	14,528	5,556	874	–	297	43,239
Windsor—Tecumseh	Lib	Lib	15,946	42.83%	3,718	9.99%	NDP	44.69%	15,946	7,751	12,228	830	–	476	37,231
Windsor West	Lib	Lib	14,127	41.31%	3,583	10.48%	NDP	41.57%	14,127	8,476	10,544	1,051	–	–	34,198
York Centre	Lib	Lib	14,694	45.36%	3,188	9.84%	PC	45.74%	14,694	11,506	4,579	535	127	954	32,395
York—Simcoe	PC	PC	20,425	52.78%	10,929	28.24%	Lib	42.91%	9,496	20,425	6,607	1,479	–	690	38,697
York South—Weston	Lib	Lib	13,805	44.55%	734	2.37%	NDP	44.86%	13,805	3,441	13,071	474	45	151	30,987
York West	Lib	Lib	11,455	50.49%	3,554	15.66%	NDP	39.24%	11,455	2,735	7,901	287	203	107	22,688

= open seat
= turnout is above provincial average
= incumbent re-elected
= incumbency arose from byelection gain

=== Comparative analysis for ridings (2011 vs 2007) ===
Summary of riding results by turnout and vote share for winning candidate (vs 2007) (Note: Summarized from "Data Explorer". Elections Ontario.)
Riding and winning party			Turnout		Vote share	
Riding and winning party			%	Change (pp)	%	Change (pp)
Ajax—Pickering	Lib	Hold	44.84	-4.49	47.34	-1.74
Algoma—Manitoulin	NDP	Gain	49.43	-5.06	44.52	7.57
Ancaster—Dundas—Flamborough—Westdale	Lib	Hold	56.45	-1.67	43.70	2.53
Barrie	PC	Gain	46.00	-5.95	40.66	1.44
Beaches—East York	NDP	Hold	51.64	-2.73	46.82	2.50
Bramalea—Gore—Malton	NDP	Gain	40.71	-2.95	38.16	25.82
Brampton—Springdale	Lib	Hold	40.54	-2.91	44.43	-6.24
Brampton West	Lib	Hold	38.29	-5.63	43.76	-2.43
Brant	Lib	Hold	48.23	-4.46	37.08	-12.08
Bruce—Grey—Owen Sound	PC	Hold	54.70	-5.25	47.37	0.76
Burlington	PC	Hold	54.83	-4.08	40.41	-0.93
Cambridge	PC	Hold	46.04	-3.65	37.69	-4.01
Carleton—Mississippi Mills	PC	Hold	53.50	-1.80	50.29	2.46
Chatham-Kent—Essex	PC	Gain	49.41	0.60	41.78	13.08
Davenport	NDP	Gain	45.59	-0.25	45.93	9.44
Don Valley East	Lib	Hold	46.08	-5.22	51.08	-4.55
Don Valley West	Lib	Hold	50.93	-8.27	58.32	7.88
Dufferin—Caledon	PC	Hold	47.74	-4.76	46.95	5.10
Durham	PC	Hold	49.74	-4.61	49.07	2.12
Eglinton—Lawrence	Lib	Hold	51.81	-3.82	54.15	10.92
Elgin—Middlesex—London	PC	Gain	51.28	-1.81	47.86	17.40
Essex	NDP	Gain	51.38	2.69	37.99	17.22
Etobicoke Centre	Lib	Hold	52.62	-6.78	51.48	1.41
Etobicoke—Lakeshore	Lib	Hold	50.01	-3.61	51.02	5.03
Etobicoke North	Lib	Hold	40.15	-5.04	48.46	-6.39
Glengarry—Prescott—Russell	Lib	Hold	47.81	-4.98	43.18	-17.33
Guelph	Lib	Hold	50.27	-6.77	42.43	1.52
Haldimand—Norfolk	PC	Hold	53.31	-2.94	60.81	-0.11
Haliburton—Kawartha Lakes—Brock	PC	Hold	54.98	-4.25	45.43	-4.56
Halton	PC	Hold	45.99	-5.54	44.47	2.63
Hamilton Centre	NDP	Hold	42.43	-6.20	61.33	16.61
Hamilton East—Stoney Creek	NDP	Hold	46.26	-5.10	51.72	14.07
Hamilton Mountain	NDP	Gain	50.45	-2.89	45.16	11.64
Huron—Bruce	PC	Gain	59.23	-0.57	42.76	12.22
Kenora—Rainy River	NDP	Hold	45.75	-0.41	49.62	-11.00
Kingston and the Islands	Lib	Hold	45.03	-8.93	48.84	1.61
Kitchener Centre	Lib	Hold	49.16	-0.42	39.23	-6.67
Kitchener—Conestoga	PC	Gain	46.62	-2.63	44.18	7.15
Kitchener—Waterloo	PC	Hold	50.54	-3.08	43.77	2.93
Lambton—Kent—Middlesex	PC	Gain	54.08	-1.10	45.74	9.43
Lanark—Frontenac—Lennox and Addington	PC	Hold	50.43	-1.65	50.12	9.54
Leeds—Grenville	PC	Hold	50.64	-4.47	63.60	7.36
London—Fanshawe	NDP	Gain	45.82	-2.39	40.77	14.45
London North Centre	Lib	Hold	47.87	-2.13	43.91	-3.26
London West	Lib	Hold	53.01	-4.82	45.65	-6.77
Markham—Unionville	Lib	Hold	40.68	0.17	52.58	-6.89
Mississauga—Brampton South	Lib	Hold	36.43	-6.04	46.04	-7.74
Mississauga East—Cooksville	Lib	Hold	40.50	-6.98	45.74	-13.19
Mississauga—Erindale	Lib	Hold	43.91	-3.17	45.03	-2.82
Mississauga South	Lib	Hold	51.25	-2.83	50.71	4.03
Mississauga—Streetsville	Lib	Hold	41.46	-4.17	51.54	-1.01
Nepean—Carleton	PC	Hold	49.91	-4.71	54.48	4.20
Newmarket—Aurora	PC	Hold	49.33	-5.88	47.24	4.53
Niagara Falls	Lib	Hold	49.44	-1.64	35.89	-11.64
Niagara West—Glanbrook	PC	Hold	54.88	-3.69	50.95	-0.10
Nickel Belt	NDP	Hold	49.55	-4.01	54.86	8.27
Nipissing	PC	Gain	51.86	-4.93	50.11	9.40
Northumberland—Quinte West	PC	Gain	51.88	-3.04	39.80	8.59
Oak Ridges—Markham	Lib	Hold	42.70	-5.07	44.78	-3.43
Oakville	Lib	Hold	52.70	-5.56	48.09	-1.72
Oshawa	PC	Hold	44.26	-4.67	42.25	3.23
Ottawa Centre	Lib	Hold	53.73	-4.52	46.81	11.90
Ottawa—Orléans	Lib	Hold	52.65	-5.21	46.44	-6.42
Ottawa South	Lib	Hold	51.19	-5.41	48.86	-1.28
Ottawa—Vanier	Lib	Hold	46.81	-4.69	51.51	0.55
Ottawa West—Nepean	Lib	Hold	54.02	-3.49	41.62	-9.02
Oxford	PC	Hold	49.18	-4.54	54.87	7.60
Parkdale—High Park	NDP	Hold	51.79	-5.65	46.20	1.49
Parry Sound—Muskoka	PC	Hold	51.79	-4.97	54.09	6.87
Perth—Wellington	PC	Gain	51.89	-2.73	40.09	8.29
Peterborough	Lib	Hold	53.18	-4.29	39.93	-7.79
Pickering—Scarborough East	Lib	Hold	49.69	-4.32	46.66	-1.96
Prince Edward—Hastings	PC	Gain	51.74	-2.42	42.28	9.46
Renfrew—Nipissing—Pembroke	PC	Hold	52.69	-4.86	70.78	8.44
Richmond Hill	Lib	Hold	42.49	-4.74	46.92	-0.91
St. Catharines	Lib	Hold	51.00	-2.82	40.21	-7.03
St. Paul's	Lib	Hold	50.41	-5.59	58.39	10.96
Sarnia—Lambton	PC	Hold	51.75	-3.45	48.32	10.16
Sault Ste. Marie	Lib	Hold	49.35	-6.21	54.95	-5.18
Scarborough—Agincourt	Lib	Hold	43.57	-2.44	46.85	-11.22
Scarborough Centre	Lib	Hold	44.49	-3.57	51.43	-2.24
Scarborough—Guildwood	Lib	Hold	47.65	-3.64	48.93	6.41
Scarborough—Rouge River	Lib	Hold	42.89	1.07	41.87	-23.18
Scarborough Southwest	Lib	Hold	47.78	-1.92	44.09	-2.06
Simcoe—Grey	PC	Hold	48.12	-6.75	54.33	3.68
Simcoe North	PC	Hold	50.98	-3.08	55.16	5.34
Stormont—Dundas—South Glengarry	PC	Gain	51.40	-0.41	55.25	16.52
Sudbury	Lib	Hold	49.94	-1.17	42.37	-16.40
Thornhill	PC	Hold	45.35	-6.82	46.71	0.79
Thunder Bay—Atikokan	Lib	Hold	46.61	-5.75	38.97	1.28
Thunder Bay—Superior North	Lib	Hold	48.20	-5.71	45.00	-1.78
Timiskaming—Cochrane	NDP	Gain	50.01	-4.79	50.12	9.57
Timmins—James Bay	NDP	Hold	46.84	-6.92	49.47	-2.14
Toronto Centre	Lib	Hold	48.42	-1.49	54.94	7.09
Toronto—Danforth	NDP	Hold	49.30	-3.88	54.01	8.16
Trinity—Spadina	NDP	Hold	43.00	-6.64	42.36	1.21
Vaughan	Lib	Hold	41.08	-5.23	53.02	-8.88
Welland	NDP	Hold	51.64	-3.64	44.66	-9.27
Wellington—Halton Hills	PC	Hold	51.11	-6.38	55.62	6.46
Whitby—Oshawa	PC	Hold	49.69	-3.85	48.17	4.16
Willowdale	Lib	Hold	45.40	-4.11	50.84	3.12
Windsor—Tecumseh	Lib	Hold	44.69	0.65	42.83	-6.51
Windsor West	Lib	Hold	41.57	0.55	41.31	-8.88
York Centre	Lib	Hold	45.74	-3.33	45.36	-3.37
York—Simcoe	PC	Hold	42.91	-6.81	52.78	6.55
York South—Weston	Lib	Hold	44.86	-1.48	44.55	1.61
York West	Lib	Hold	39.24	-5.21	50.49	-4.25

==== Maps ====
Support for Liberal Party candidates by riding

Support for Conservative Party candidates by riding

Support for New Democratic Party candidates by riding

Support for Green Party candidates by riding

=== Principal races ===
Party candidates in 2nd place
Party in 1st place	Party in 2nd place			Total
Party in 1st place	Lib	PC	NDP	Total
Liberal	–	40	13	53
Progressive Conservative	34	–	3	37
New Democratic	13	4	–	17
Total	47	44	16	107

Principal races, according to 1st and 2nd-place results
Parties		Seats
█ Liberal	█ Progressive Conservative	74
█ Liberal	█ New Democratic	26
█ Progressive Conservative	█ New Democratic	7
Total		107

Candidates ranked 1st to 5th place, by party
Parties	1st	2nd	3rd	4th	5th	Total
█ Liberal	53	47	7			107
█ Progressive Conservative	37	44	26			107
█ New Democratic	17	16	73	1		107
█ Green			1	101	5	107
█ Libertarian				3	36	39
█ Independent				1	10	11
█ Northern Ontario Heritage				1	1	2
█ Family Coalition					21	21
█ Freedom					18	18
█ Special Needs					2	2
█ Communist					1	1
█ Confederation of Regions					1	1
█ Socialist					1	1

=== Significant results among independent and minor party candidates ===
Those candidates not belonging to a major party, receiving more than 1,000 votes in the election, are listed below:

Riding	Party	Candidates	Votes	Placed
Bruce—Grey—Owen Sound	█ Independent	Shane Jolley	1,478	5th
Oak Ridges—Markham	█ Libertarian	Karl Boelling	1,057	4th
Sarnia—Lambton	█ Independent	Andy Bruziewicz	1,077	4th

=== Seats changing hands ===
There were 18 seats that changed allegiance from the 2007 election.

Liberal to PC

- Barrie
- Chatham-Kent—Essex
- Elgin—Middlesex—London
- Huron—Bruce
- Kitchener—Conestoga
- Lambton—Kent—Middlesex
- Nipissing
- Northumberland—Quinte West
- Perth—Wellington
- Prince Edward—Hastings
- Stormont—Dundas—South Glengarry

Liberal to NDP

- Algoma—Manitoulin
- Bramalea—Gore—Malton
- Davenport
- Essex
- Hamilton Mountain
- London—Fanshawe
- Timiskaming—Cochrane

Resulting composition of the 41st Legislative Assembly of Ontario
Source		Party			
Source		Lib	PC	NDP	Total
Seats retained	Incumbents returned	47	21	8	76
Seats retained	Open seats held	6	4	2	12
Seats retained	Byelection loss reversed		1		1
Seats changing hands	Incumbents defeated		6	4	10
Seats changing hands	Open seats gained		5	3	8
Total		53	37	17	107

== Opinion polls ==
Polling Firm	Date of Polling	Link	Liberal	PC	NDP	Green	Type of poll	Margin of error
Angus Reid	October 4–5, 2011	PDF	37	33	26	3	Online	3.6%
EKOS	October 3–5, 2011	PDF	37.7	31.5	23.3	5.9	Interactive voice response	2.0%
Forum Research	October 4, 2011	HTML	37	36	23	3	Interactive voice response	3.1%
Angus Reid	October 3–4, 2011	PDF	33	36	26	5	Online	2.1%
Abacus Data	October 3–4, 2011	HTML	37	34	24	4	Online	3.1%
EKOS	October 2–4, 2011	PDF	39.0	29.7	23.1	6.6	Interactive voice response	2.2%
Nanos Research	October 2–3, 2011	PDF	40.1	33.0	23.2	2.8	Telephone	4.2%
EKOS	October 2–3, 2011	PDF	39.1	29.1	24.5	6.0	Interactive voice response	2.9%
Nanos Research	October 1–3, 2011	PDF	37.7	33.2	25.8	2.1	Telephone	3.4%
Ipsos Reid	September 30 – October 3, 2011	PDF	41	31	25	3	Telephone	3.1%
Nanos Research	September 30 – October 2, 2011	PDF	35.9	36.4	25.7	1.2	Telephone	3.5%
EKOS	September 29 – October 2, 2011	PDF	37.8	30.6	22.7	7.3	Interactive voice response	2.8%
Nanos Research	September 29 – October 1, 2011	PDF	36.5	34	26.8	1.9	Telephone	3.5%
Nanos Research	September 28–30, 2011	PDF	38.0	35.3	24.6	1.8	Telephone	3.5%
Angus Reid	September 28–30, 2011	PDF	33	34	26	6	Online	3.1%
Leger Marketing	September 28–29, 2011	PDF	32	34	29	5	Online	3.1%
Nanos Research	September 28–29, 2011	PDF	37.7	34.4	25.5	2.0	Telephone	4.3%
Environics	September 26–28, 2011	HTML	35	36	25	3	Online	
Abacus Data	September 23–25, 2011	PDF	33	37	23	6	Online	2.9%
EKOS	September 21–25, 2011	PDF	34.9	31.4	24.7	7.6	Interactive voice response	2.3%
Forum Research	September 22–23, 2011	HTML	35	35	23	5	Interactive voice response	0.5%
Angus Reid	September 13–15, 2011	HTML	32	36	26	6	Online	3.1%
Leger Marketing	September 12–15, 2011	PDF	33	36	26	5	Online	3.1%
Abacus Data	September 9–12, 2011	HTML	32	41	20	6	Online	3.2%
Nanos Research	September 10–11, 2011	PDF	38.1	34.7	24.3	2.7	Telephone	4.9%
Ipsos Reid	September 7–11, 2011	HTML	38	37	24	1	Telephone	3.5%
Harris-Decima	August 25 – September 4, 2011	HTML	40	29	24	6	Telephone	3.8%
Nanos Research	August 30 – September 1, 2011	PDF	31.9	35.4	22.8	4.1	Telephone	3.1%
Forum Research	August 29–30, 2011	HTML	30	35	26	7	Interactive voice response	2.0%
Angus Reid	August 25–28, 2011	PDF	31	38	24	6	Online	3.1%
Nanos Research	August 10–13, 2011	PDF	37.6	42.1	16.2	3.4	Telephone	3.4%
Ipsos Reid	July 29 – August 4, 2011	HTML	36	38	23	3	Telephone	4.9%
Forum Research	July 27–28, 2011	HTML	28	38	24	7	Interactive voice response	2.1%
Ipsos Reid	June 7 – July 7, 2011	HTML	31	42	22	5	Telephone	3.5%
Forum Research	June 21–22, 2011	HTML	26	41	22	8	Interactive voice response	1.7%
Ipsos Reid	May 17 – June 9, 2011	HTML	34	40	20	6	Telephone	3.5%
Nanos Research	May 14–15, 2011	PDF	34	41	19	5	Telephone	4.7%
Nanos Research	March 8–11, 2011	PDF	35	44	16	4	Telephone	4.9%
Nanos Research	January 31 – February 3, 2011	PDF	39	43	13	5	Telephone	4.7%
Ipsos Reid	January 20, 2011	HTML	35	38	17	9	Telephone	
Ipsos Reid	November 18, 2010	HTML	32	41	20	7		
Angus Reid	September 28, 2010	PDF	29	41	22	8	Online	3.5%
Ipsos Reid	August 21, 2010	HTML	35	36	18	11		
Ipsos Reid	June 19, 2010	HTML	37	32	20	11		
Nanos Research	February 9–10, 2010	PDF	41.4	37.9	12.8	7.9	Telephone	4.9%
Ipsos Reid	December 13, 2009	HTML	38	34	15	10		
Angus Reid	December 4, 2009	PDF	27	41	20	11		
Nanos Research	October 24–25, 2009	PDF	36.6	35	17.2	9.8	Telephone	4.8%
Environics	October 2009	HTML	32	37	19	11		
Environics	June 2009	HTML	44	32	15	8		
Environics	April 2009	HTML	44	29	17	11		
Environics	January 2009	HTML	45	32	12	11		
Environics	November 2008	HTML	35	30	21	13		
Environics	June 2008	HTML	41	31	16	12		
Environics	March 2008	HTML	38	30	19	12		
Environics	January 2008	HTML	45	34	18	2		
Environics	November 2007	HTML	44	31	22	3		
Election 2007	October 10, 2007	PDF	42.3	31.6	16.8	8.0		

== Media endorsements ==
Liberals

- Barrie Advance
- The Globe and Mail
- Hamilton Spectator
- Ottawa Citizen
- Sudbury Star
- Toronto Star
- Waterloo Region Record
- Windsor Star

Progressive Conservatives

- Brampton Guardian
- Metroland Durham Region Media Group
- National Post

Did not endorse

- Toronto Sun, Ottawa Sun
