= Cristina Martins =

Canadian politician

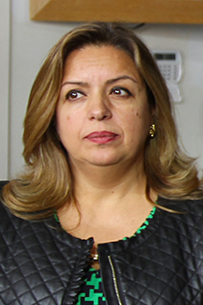
- Martins in 2015

Ontario MPP
- In office 2014–2018
- Preceded by: Jonah Schein
- Succeeded by: Marit Stiles
- Constituency: Davenport

Personal details
- Born: Portugal
- Party: Liberal
- Profession: Pharmacist

Isabel Cristina P. L. Bento Martins is a former politician in Ontario, Canada. She was a Liberal member of the Legislative Assembly of Ontario from 2014 to 2018 who represented the downtown Toronto riding of Davenport.

== Background ==
She emigrated with her family from Portugal in 1970. Prior to her election, she worked almost 15 years in the pharmaceutical industry.

== Politics ==
Martins ran in the 2011 provincial election as the Liberal candidate in the riding of Davenport. She was defeated by New Democratic Party candidate Jonah Schein by 1,414 votes. She ran again in the 2014 election this time defeating Schein by 1,950 votes.

She was Parliamentary Assistant to the Minister of Citizenship, Immigration and International Trade.

== Election results ==
2018 Ontario general election: Davenport
Party	Candidate	Votes	%	±%
New Democratic	Marit Stiles	27,613	60.27	+20.12
Liberal	Cristina Martins	8,558	18.68	-26.93
Progressive Conservative	Federico Sanchez	7,370	16.09	+8.62
Green	Kirsten Snider	1,624	3.54	-1.46
Libertarian	Nunzino Venuto	210	0.46	-0.24
Communist	Dave McKee	152	0.33	-0.15
Freedom	Franz Cauchi	127	0.28	-0.03
People's Political Party	Troy Young	96	0.21	-0.10
Independent	Chai Kalevar	69	0.15	N/A
Turnout		45,819	58.43	+8.83
Eligible voters		78,414		
New Democratic gain from Liberal		Swing		+23.53
Source: Elections Ontario

2014 Ontario general election
Party	Candidate	Votes	%	±%
Liberal	Cristina Martins	16,205	45.52	+4.11
New Democratic	Jonah Schein	14,164	39.79	-6.14
Progressive Conservative	Lan Daniel	2,619	7.36	-0.57
Green	Daniel Stein	1,974	5.55	+2.82
Libertarian	Nunzio Venuto	252	0.71	
Communist	Mariam Ahmad	174	0.49	-0.03
Freedom	Franz Cauchi	111	0.31	0
People's Political Party	Troy Young	99	0.28	
Liberal gain from New Democratic		Swing		+5.13
Source: Elections Ontario

2011 Ontario general election
Party	Candidate	Votes	%	±%
New Democratic	Jonah Schein	14,367	45.93	+9.44
Liberal	Cristina Martins	12,953	41.41	-0.41
Progressive Conservative	Kirk Russell	2,480	7.93	-1.48
Green	Frank de Jong	855	2.73	-7.49
Independent	Mark Jagg	250	0.80	
Communist	Miguel Figueroa	163	0.52	-0.12
Freedom	Franz Cauchi	96	0.31	
Human Rights	Alix Thompson	82	0.26	
The Only Party	Kiros Ghiwot	33	0.11	
Total valid votes		31,279	100.00	
Total rejected, unmarked and declined ballots		178	0.57	
Turnout		31,457	45.59	
Eligible voters		68,998		
New Democratic gain from Liberal		Swing		+4.93
Source: Elections Ontario
