= 2009 Green Party of Ontario leadership election =

Canadian political party leadership election

- November 14, 2009
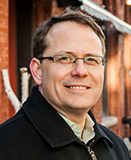

Candidate	Mike Schreiner	None of the above
Result	Winner	-
Leader before election
Frank de Jong
Elected Leader
Mike Schreiner

2009 Green Party of Ontario leadership election
- Date: November 13–15, 2009
- Convention: London, Ontario
- Resigning leader: Frank de Jong
- Won by: Mike Schreiner
- Ballots: 1
- Candidates: 1 (+ none of the above)

The 2009 Green Party of Ontario leadership election took place November 13–15, 2009 in London, Ontario.

Longtime Green Party of Ontario leader Frank de Jong told the GPO convention on May 16, 2009, that he would be stepping down as leader of the party. De Jong was the founding leader of the party,, and although he was never able to win a seat for the party, under his leadership its share of the vote rose from 0.34% in 1995 to 8.1% in 2007.

At the close of nominations, Mike Schreiner was the sole candidate who had submitted nomination documents. Per party rules, Schreiner still had to run in the leadership convention, however, his only opponent on the ballot was "none of the above". Schreiner's election was confirmed on November 14, 2009.

== Registered candidates ==
Mike Schreiner, policy director for the GPO, and the candidate for the Haliburton—Kawartha Lakes—Brock 2009 by-election, in which he finished in third.

== None of the above ==
The None of the above ballot option was available to members.

== Potential candidates who did not enter ==
- Shane Jolley, who at the time was the male deputy leader of the GPO. In the 2007 provincial election, Jolley was the Green Party's candidate in Bruce—Grey—Owen Sound and came in second place with more than 33 per cent of the vote, giving Jolley the best finish of any Green Party candidate in the election, and at the time, the best finish for a Green Party candidate across Canada.
- David Chernushenko, former Senior Deputy to the Leader of the Green Party of Canada, and a former federal Green leadership contestant, member of the National Round Table on Environment and the Economy. Ran for the federal Greens in the riding of Ottawa Centre in 2004 and 2006, getting some of the best results for the party in those elections, and in the riding of Ottawa South for the provincial Green Party in 2003.
- Mark MacKenzie, former Eastern Male Regional Representative on the Green Party of Ontario's Provincial Executive, 2007 election candidate in Renfrew—Nipissing—Pembroke, 2010 by-election candidate in Ottawa West-Nepean.
- Andrew James, author and 2007 election candidate in Eglinton—Lawrence.

== Timeline ==
- May 16, 2009 - De Jong tells the GPO AGM he will be stepping down as leader.
- September 1, 2009 - Nominations close.
- November 13–15, 2009 - GPO leadership convention.
  - November 14, 2009 - Schreiner affirmed as the party's new leader.
