= Davenport (provincial electoral district) =

Provincial electoral district in Ontario, Canada

Coordinates: 43.67°N 79.44°W

Ontario electoral district
- Location in Toronto

Provincial electoral district
- Legislature: Legislative Assembly of Ontario
MPP
Marit Stiles
New Democratic
- District created: 1996
- First contested: 1999
- Last contested: 2025

Demographics
- Population (2021): 105,946
- Electors (2025): 83,613
- Area (km²): 12
- Pop. density (per km²): 8,828.8
- Census division: Toronto
- Census subdivision: Toronto

Davenport is a provincial electoral district in Toronto, Ontario, Canada. It elects one member to the Legislative Assembly of Ontario.

It was created in 1999 from parts of Oakwood, Dovercourt, Parkdale, High Park—Swansea and a small part of York South.

When the riding was created, it included all of Metro Toronto within the following line: Dovercourt Road to the CN railway to the Old Toronto city limits to Old Weston Road to Rogers Road to another CN railway to Eglinton Avenue to Dufferin Street to Rogers Road to Oakwood Avenue to Holland Park Avenue to Winona Drive to Davenport Road to Ossington Avenue to the CP railway back to Dovercourt Road.

In 2007, the boundaries were extended in the east so that they continued along Ossington south of the CP railway until Dundas Street and in the northwest the boundary became Keele Street and Lavender Road instead of the old city limits.

== Members of Provincial Parliament ==
Davenport
Assembly	Years	Member	Party
Riding created from Oakwood, Dovercourt, Parkdale, High Park—Swansea and York South
37th	1999–2003	Tony Ruprecht	Liberal
38th	2003–2007	Tony Ruprecht	Liberal
39th	2007–2011	Tony Ruprecht	Liberal
40th	2011–2014	Jonah Schein	New Democratic
41st	2014–2018	Cristina Martins	Liberal
42nd	2018–2022	Marit Stiles	New Democratic
43rd	2022–2025	Marit Stiles	New Democratic
44th	2025–present	Marit Stiles	New Democratic
Sourced from the Ontario Legislative Assembly

== Election results ==
Winning party in each polling division of Davenport at the 2025 Ontario general election

2025 Ontario general election
Party	Candidate	Votes	%	±%	Expenditures
New Democratic	Marit Stiles	22,143	57.07	+0.00	$82,899
Liberal	Paulo Pereira	7,983	20.57	+1.36	$34,082
Progressive Conservative	Nick Pavlov	6,937	17.88	+3.80	$1,103
Green	Randi Ramdeen	1,184	3.05	–1.77	$0
Communist	Dave McKee	556	1.43	+0.51	$0
Total valid votes/expense limit		38,803	99.30	–	$136,245
Total rejected, unmarked and declined ballots		273	0.70	–0.06	
Turnout		39,076	46.18	+2.87	
Eligible voters		84,624			
New Democratic hold		Swing		–0.68	
Source: Elections Ontario

Winning party in each polling division of Davenport at the 2022 Ontario general election

2022 Ontario general election
Party	Candidate	Votes	%	±%	Expenditures
New Democratic	Marit Stiles	20,242	57.06	–3.20	$107,755
Liberal	Jerry Levitan	6,815	19.21	+0.53	$67,441
Progressive Conservative	Paul Spence	4,994	14.08	–2.01	$6,103
Green	Karen Stephenson	1,710	4.82	+1.28	$542
Ontario Party	Diti Coutinho	400	1.13	–	$4,541
New Blue	Mario Bilusic	395	1.11	–	$2,719
Libertarian	Nunzio Venuto	375	1.06	+0.60	$0
Communist	Jack Copple	326	0.92	+0.59	$0
Independent	Nicholas Alexander	139	0.39	–	$550
Independent	Simon Fogel	77	0.22	–	$300
Total valid votes/expense limit		35,473	99.24	–	$117,313
Total rejected, unmarked and declined ballots		272	0.76	–0.25	
Turnout		35,745	43.30	–12.52	
Eligible voters		82,547			
New Democratic hold		Swing		–1.87	
Source: Elections Ontario

2018 Ontario general election
Party	Candidate	Votes	%	±%
New Democratic	Marit Stiles	27,613	60.27	+20.12
Liberal	Cristina Martins	8,558	18.68	–26.94
Progressive Conservative	Federico Sanchez	7,370	16.09	+8.61
Green	Kirsten Snider	1,624	3.54	–1.46
Libertarian	Nunzio Venuto	210	0.46	–0.24
Communist	Dave McKee	152	0.33	–0.15
Freedom	Franz Cauchi	127	0.28	–0.03
People's Political Party	Troy Young	96	0.21	–0.07
No Affiliation	Chai Kalevar	69	0.15	–
Total valid votes		45,819	98.98	
Total rejected, unmarked and declined ballots		470	1.02	–0.18
Turnout		46,289	55.82	+6.26
Eligible voters		82,924		
New Democratic gain from Liberal		Swing		+23.53
Source: Elections Ontario

2014 Ontario general election
Party	Candidate	Votes	%	±%
Liberal	Cristina Martins	16,272	45.61	+4.20
New Democratic	Jonah Schein	14,322	40.15	–5.78
Progressive Conservative	Lan Daniel	2,665	7.47	–0.46
Green	Daniel Stein	1,784	5.00	+2.27
Libertarian	Nunzio Venuto	250	0.70	–
Communist	Mariam Ahmad	172	0.48	–0.04
Freedom	Franz Cauchi	110	0.31	+0.00
People's Political Party	Troy Young	99	0.28	–
Total valid votes		35,674	98.80	
Total rejected, unmarked and declined ballots		433	1.20	+0.63
Turnout		36,107	49.56	+3.97
Eligible voters		72,851		
Liberal gain from New Democratic		Swing		+4.99
Source: Elections Ontario

2011 Ontario general election
Party	Candidate	Votes	%	±%
New Democratic	Jonah Schein	14,367	45.93	+9.44
Liberal	Cristina Martins	12,953	41.41	–0.41
Progressive Conservative	Kirk Russell	2,480	7.93	–1.48
Green	Frank de Jong	855	2.73	–7.49
Independent	Mark Jagg	250	0.80	–
Communist	Miguel Figueroa	163	0.52	–0.12
Freedom	Franz Cauchi	96	0.31	–
Party for Human Rights	Allix Thompson	82	0.26	–
The Only Party	Kiros Ghiwot	33	0.11	–
Total valid votes		31,279	99.43	
Total rejected, unmarked and declined ballots		178	0.57	–0.80
Turnout		31,457	45.59	–0.25
Eligible voters		68,998		
New Democratic gain from Liberal		Swing		+4.92
Source: Elections Ontario

2007 Ontario general election
Party	Candidate	Votes	%	±%
Liberal	Tony Ruprecht	12,467	41.82	–16.99
New Democratic	Peter Ferreira	10,880	36.49	+9.17
Green	Frank de Jong	3,047	10.22	+6.80
Progressive Conservative	Antonio Garcia	2,805	9.41	+1.95
Communist	Dave McKee	191	0.64	–
Family Coalition	Gustavo Valdez	157	0.53	–
Libertarian	Nunzio Venuto	152	0.51	–0.37
Independent	Annette Kouri	114	0.38	–
Total valid votes		29,813	98.63	
Total rejected, unmarked and declined ballots		413	1.37	–0.11
Turnout		30,226	45.84	–3.22
Eligible voters		65,934		
Liberal hold		Swing		–13.08
Source: Elections Ontario

2003 Ontario general election
Party	Candidate	Votes	%	±%
Liberal	Tony Ruprecht	15,586	58.81	+9.09
New Democratic	Jordan Berger	7,243	27.33	–4.43
Progressive Conservative	Tom Smith	1,977	7.46	–8.37
Green	Mark O'Brien	907	3.42	+2.61
Independent	David Senater	293	1.11	–
Freedom	Franz Cauchi	264	1.00	–
Libertarian	Nunzio Venuto	233	0.88	+0.53
Total valid votes		26,503	98.52	
Total rejected, unmarked and declined ballots		398	1.48	–0.53
Turnout		26,901	49.06	–9.97
Eligible voters		54,828		
Liberal hold		Swing		+6.76
Source: Elections Ontario

1999 Ontario general election
Party	Candidate	Votes	%
Liberal	Tony Ruprecht	13,649	49.72
New Democratic	Tony Silipo	8,717	31.76
Progressive Conservative	Eduardo Marcos	4,346	15.83
Green	Paul Simas	224	0.82
Reform	Ken Kalopsis	174	0.63
Independent	Barbara Seed	164	0.60
Libertarian	Nunzio Venuto	95	0.35
Natural Law	Maurice F. Seguin	81	0.30
Total valid votes		27,450	97.99
Total rejected, unmarked and declined ballots		564	2.01
Turnout		28,014	59.04
Eligible voters		47,451	
Liberal pickup new district.			
Source: Elections Ontario

== 2007 electoral reform referendum ==
2007 Ontario electoral reform referendum
Side	Votes	%
First Past the Post	12,222	43.2
Mixed member proportional	15,973	56.7
Total valid votes	28,195	100.0

- This riding was one of five ridings where a majority of voters supported MMP.

== See also ==
- List of Ontario provincial electoral districts
- Canadian provincial electoral districts
