= I Met the Walrus =

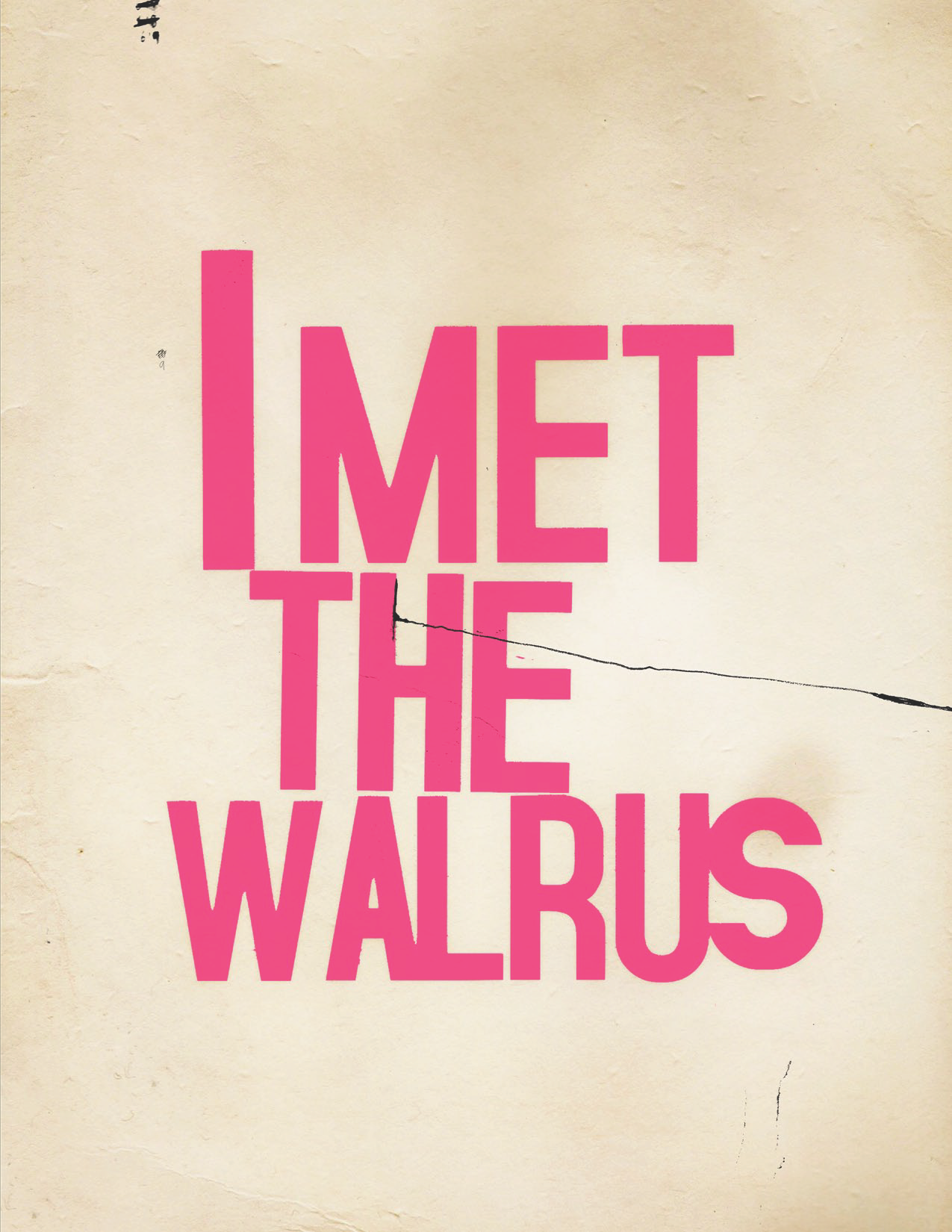
- Directed by: Josh Raskin
- Produced by: Jerry Levitan
- Starring: John Lennon; Jerry Levitan
- Release date: March 22, 2007
- Running time: 5 minutes
- Country: Canada
- Language: English

I Met the Walrus is an animated film directed by Josh Raskin (known for his musical project Kids & Explosions) and produced by Jerry Levitan. It stars Levitan and John Lennon. The film's pen illustration is by James Braithwaite and computer illustration is by Alex Kurina.

== Summary ==
The film is based on an interview of John Lennon by Jerry Levitan in 1969. Levitan, then 14 years old, tracked Lennon to his hotel room at Toronto's King Edward Hotel after hearing a rumour that Lennon had been sighted at the Toronto Airport. Jerry made his way into John Lennon's suite and persuaded John to agree to an interview. The animation is based on Levitan's 30-minute recording of the interview, which was edited down to 5 minutes.

== Production ==
The film was created in 2006-2007, produced by Jerry Levitan and supported by a grant from Bravo!FACT. It premiered March 22, 2007 at This is London, a Toronto nightclub. Since then, I Met the Walrus has appeared at film festivals around the world. I Met The Walrus has since been adapted as a book, authored by Jerry Levitan and published by HarperCollins.

== Accolades ==
It has won many awards including a 2009 Daytime Emmy in the New Approaches, Daytime Entertainment category, Best Animated Short awards for the American Film Institute and the Middle East International Film Festival. The film was nominated for an Academy Award for Best Animated Short Film by the Academy of Motion Picture Arts and Sciences. It was also included in the Animation Show of Shows. It was selected to be one of 25 YouTube videos to be part of the first Guggenheim Museum/YouTube Play "A Biennial of Creative Video".
