= Jerry Levitan =

Canadian writer

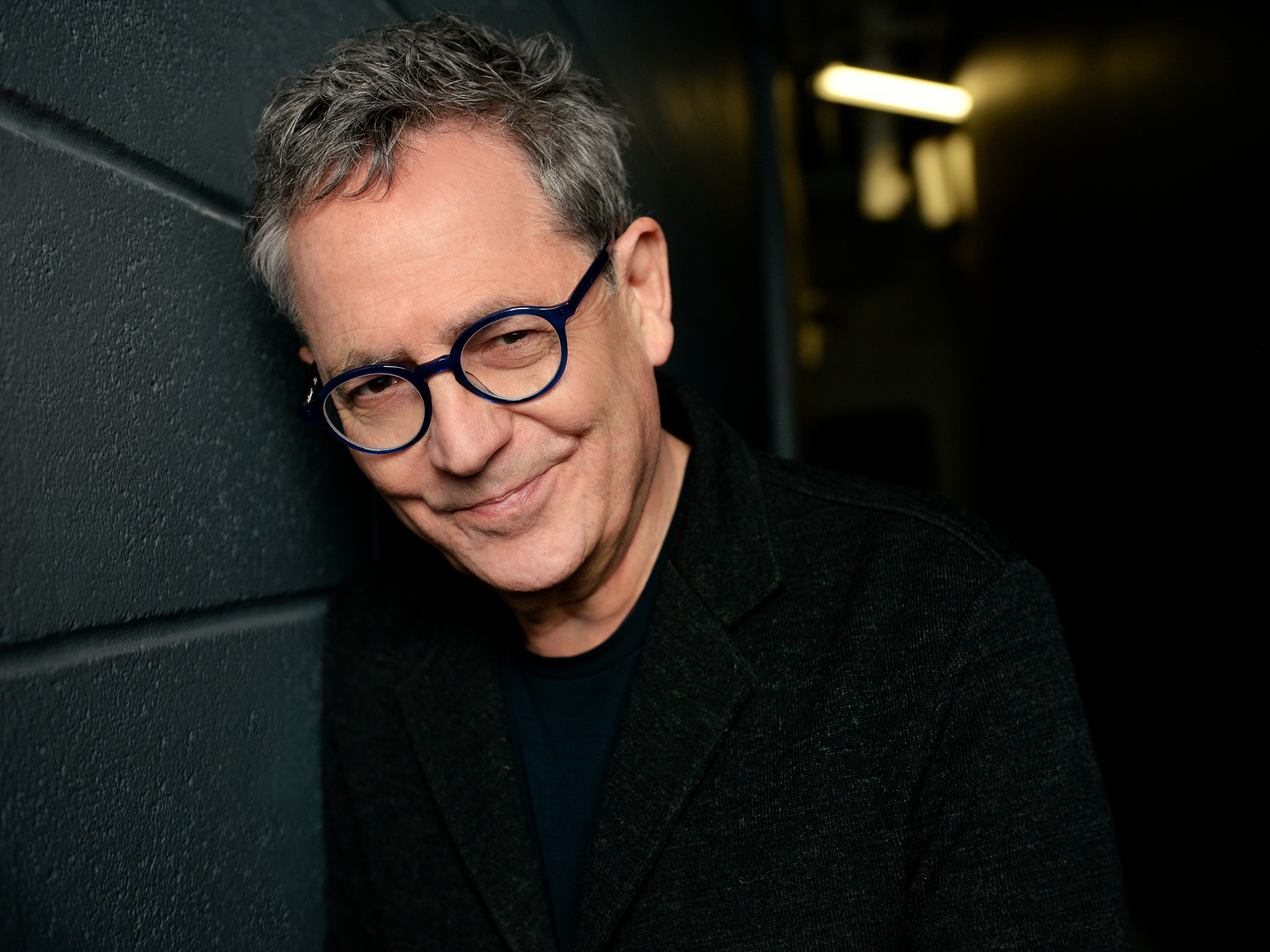
- Jerry Levitan in 2020
- Born: July 22, 1954 (age 72)
- Occupations: Politician, Lawyer, Writer, Film Maker, Actor, Musician
- Known for: I Met the Walrus

Jerry Levitan (born 1954) is a Canadian best known as "the kid who interviewed John Lennon". He produced and starred in the animated short I Met the Walrus about his meeting with John Lennon and Yoko Ono in Toronto, Ontario, Canada in 1969. Though only 14 years old, Levitan beat the world media and conducted an exclusive 30-minute interview with them about peace, The Beatles, and their music.

The film won a Daytime Emmy in 2009 in the category of New Approaches, Daytime Entertainment. It was also nominated for an Oscar in 2008 for best animated short, and won Best Animated at the Manhattan Short Film Festival, the American Film Festival and the Middle East International Film Festival. He is the author of the best selling, autobiographical book, I Met The Walrus published May 2009 by HarperCollins. It is the account of Levitan's childhood growing up in the sixties, his love for the Beatles, and traces in detail the day he spent with John Lennon and Yoko Ono.

In 2010, Levitan was honored by the Guggenheim Museum and YouTube when I Met The Walrus was selected in the first Biennial of Creative Video.

In July 2011 Levitan's animated film, Yoko Ono's My Hometown had its world premiere at the Without Borders (Senza Frontiere) Film Festival in Spoleto, Italy to widespread acclaim. Levitan co-produced and directed the film. Yoko Ono narrated her poem and provided her Remember Love song which was the B-Side to Give Peace A Chance, for the soundtrack.

Levitan produced "I Am the Egbert", an animated series of 14 Spotify canvasses written and directed by Sean Ono Lennon for the 2021 release of "John Lennon/Plastic Ono Band - The Ultimate Collection".

On May 26, 2021, Jerry Levitan was nominated as the 2022 Ontario Liberal Party Candidate for the Toronto riding of Davenport.

== Biography ==
Levitan graduated with a B.A. from York University in Toronto and an LL.B. from Osgoode Hall Law School at York University in 1979, and has been involved throughout his career with high-profile legal cases. He is the author of The Complete Idiot's Guide to Winning Everyday Legal Hassles in Canada (ISBN 0-13-575150-0).

Levitan is also an actor with roles in a string of Canadian and international films and television series, including a guest appearance in The West Wing, and one of Canada's pre-eminent children's entertainers. Performing under his alter-ego "Sir Jerry" (sir-jerry.com) and backed by a full band of rock musicians and performers, he has produced four CDs, "Bees, Butterflies & Bugs", "Sir Jerry's World", "Time Machine" and "Sir Jerry Scared Silly" and is developing a television series. He appeared as himself as a contestant on a 1980 episode of the CTV game show Definition. He played with celebrity panelist Martin Short.

== Electoral history ==
2022 Ontario general election: Davenport
Party	Candidate	Votes	%	±%	Expenditures
New Democratic	Marit Stiles	20,242	57.06	–3.20	$107,755
Liberal	Jerry Levitan	6,815	19.21	+0.53	$67,441
Progressive Conservative	Paul Spence	4,994	14.08	–2.01	$6,103
Green	Karen Stephenson	1,710	4.82	+1.28	$542
Ontario Party	Diti Coutinho	400	1.13	–	$4,541
New Blue	Mario Bilusic	395	1.11	–	$2,719
Libertarian	Nunzio Venuto	375	1.06	+0.60	$0
Communist	Jack Copple	326	0.92	+0.59	$0
Independent	Nicholas Alexander	139	0.39	–	$550
Independent	Simon Fogel	77	0.22	–	$300
Total valid votes/expense limit		35,473	99.24	–	$117,313
Total rejected, unmarked and declined ballots		272	0.76	–0.25	
Turnout		35,745	43.30	–12.52	
Eligible voters		82,547			
New Democratic hold		Swing		▼1.87	
Source: Elections Ontario
