= Mike Schreiner =

Canadian politician (born 1969)

Mike Schreiner MPP
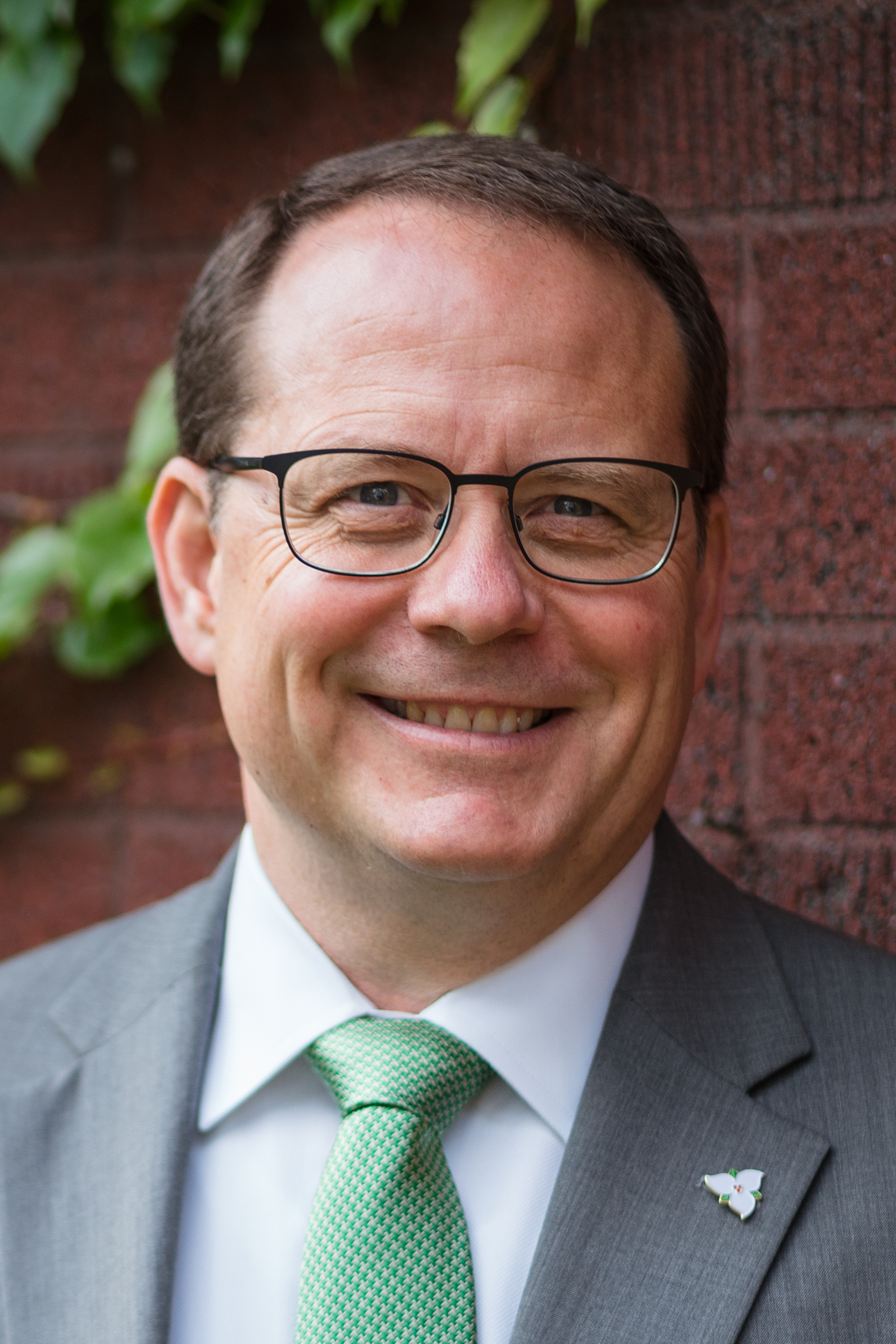
- Schreiner in 2021

Leader of the Green Party of Ontario
- Incumbent
- Assumed office 15 November 2009
- Preceded by: Frank de Jong

Member of Provincial Parliament for Guelph
- Incumbent
- Assumed office 7 June 2018
- Preceded by: Liz Sandals

Personal details
- Born: Michael John Schreiner; 9 June 1969 (age 57) WaKeeney, Kansas, U.S.
- Citizenship: Canada; United States
- Party: Ontario Green
- Children: 2
- Education: University of Kansas; Indiana University Bloomington
- Occupation: Politician; entrepreneur

Michael John Schreiner MPP (/ˈʃraɪnər/ SHRY-nər; born 9 June 1969) is a Canadian politician who has served as the leader of the Green Party of Ontario since 2009. Schreiner sits as a member of Provincial Parliament (MPP), representing Guelph; his 2018 election made him the first Green Party member elected to the Legislative Assembly of Ontario.

Prior to making politics a full-time career, Schreiner operated businesses that were food-related. He has been a small business advocate, entrepreneur, and food policy expert. Schreiner joined the Green Party of Ontario in 2005 and became leader in 2009, taking over from Frank de Jong. In 2018, Schreiner was elected with 45 per cent of the vote in the riding of Guelph. His election marked the first time that four different parties were elected to the Legislature since 1951. It was Schreiner's second time running in Guelph, after running in Haliburton—Kawartha Lakes—Brock and Simcoe—Grey previously.

== Early life and education ==
Michael John Schreiner is an American-born Canadian. He was born on 9 June 1969, in WaKeeney, Kansas, the son of Barbara and Ronald Schreiner (1949–2007). He grew up on the family grain farm, helping his parents. This is where his interest in food, agriculture and the environment began.

Schreiner earned bachelor's degrees in business administration and history from the University of Kansas in 1992. He earned his master's degree in history from Indiana University Bloomington in 1994. While at Indiana University, he met his future wife, Sandy Welsh, later a sociology professor and vice provost at the University of Toronto.

After graduating from Indiana University, Schreiner and his wife moved to Toronto in 1994; he became a Canadian citizen in 2007. Schreiner and his wife Sandy are the parents of two daughters.

== Early career ==
Schreiner has been an entrepreneur and small business owner whose ventures have focused on sustainable food production and the local food movement. His first business was Toronto Organics that specialized in delivering food to consumers.

After moving to the Guelph area, Schreiner continued operating food distribution businesses. One company – WOW Foods – was awarded the Citizens Bank of Canada Ethics in Action Award for socially responsible business and the Toronto Food Policy Council's Local Food Hero Award. He also co-founded Earthdance Organics, a Guelph-based food production business that supplied area health food stores and farmers' markets in the early 2000s.

In 2005 Schreiner co-founded Local Food Plus, which brought "farmers and consumers together to promote financially, socially and environmentally sustainable local food systems". According to the Green Party of Ontario, he has served as a volunteer with organizations including FarmStart, the Brewer's Plate, the Toronto Food Policy Council and the Green Enterprise Ontario Steering Committee, the Canadian International Peace Project, and Toronto's Campus Community Co-op Day Care Centre.

== Green Party leadership ==
Schreiner has been actively involved in the Green Party of Ontario (GPO) since 2004. He co-chaired the 2007 election platform committee and served as policy coordinator from 2008 to 2009. On 14 November 2009, Schreiner won the Ontario Green Party leadership election, having been acclaimed. According to the GPO, "Under Mike’s leadership the GPO has experienced substantial growth in its voters, fundraising, staff, volunteers and media exposure". Between 2009 and 2014, for example, fundraising increased from $50,000 to $500,000, all from individuals. Those achievements did not translate into success in terms of getting a seat until 2018.

Despite not holding a seat in the legislature at that time, Schreiner lobbied in favour of the price on carbon, protecting pollinators with a ban on neonicotinoids, and funding for the Experimental Lakes Area.

=== Early runs for office ===
Schreiner first ran as a candidate for the GPO in the Haliburton—Kawartha Lakes—Brock by-election in March 2009, losing to Rick Johnson.

In the 2011 election, Schreiner ran as a candidate for Simcoe—Grey, finishing fourth behind Progressive Conservative incumbent Jim Wilson.

Schreiner was nominated as the party's candidate for Guelph in the 2014 Ontario general election, where he finished third behind winner Liz Sandals of the Ontario Liberal Party, garnering over 19% of the vote.

=== 2018 election ===
In May 2018, the Toronto Star editorial board endorsed him as the best candidate in Guelph and said that he was "the most forthright leader in the campaign for the 7 June Ontario election". He was also endorsed by the Guelph Mercury's editorial board in an op-ed, "Mike Schreiner is the candidate most worthy of representing Guelph provincially", citing ten reasons to vote for Schreiner.

Schreiner's campaign proved successful in a four-party race, becoming the first ever Green MPP in Ontario history. He captured 45 per cent of the vote in the Guelph riding, more than doubling the previous percentage and nearly tripling the actual number of voters for him.

Schreiner's platform for the Green Party of Ontario included the following, as summarized by the Toronto Star.

- Implement more programs to help homeowners with green retrofits to save energy
- Offer universal dental care and pharmacare
- Set a date to phase out internal combustion engines to reduce greenhouse gas emissions
- Introduce carbon pricing to discourage use of greenhouse gas-producing goods and services, with revenues returned to Ontarians as dividends
- Focus health system more on illness prevention

Schreiner expanded on the platform with this comment: "I am fighting for a livable future for my children, I am fighting to tackle climate change and address income inequality, social justice issues and improving our democracy". During an interview in May 2018 he added that the Party proposed cutting payroll taxes for some small businesses to be made up for with an increased tax rate on larger businesses. Just prior to the election, he told the CBC that he hopes to see Ontario moving to 100 per cent renewable energy and was in favour of closing the nuclear power plant at Pickering. He also favoured adding mental health coverage into the Ontario Health Insurance Plan and a basic income program.

Despite efforts to convince them otherwise, Schreiner was excluded from televised leaders debates, a move the Toronto Star billed as "unfair". The publication's Ontario Politics Commentator made this comment: "This isn't the first time they have conspired to exclude the Greens, but this time the exclusion is more egregious than ever".

Following his win in the 2018 election, Schreiner was sworn into the Ontario Legislature on 5 July. Although he had been viewed by many as primarily a "green" candidate Schreiner said that his goal would be broader. "I'm going to do politics differently. I campaigned on a promise to create jobs, put people and planet first. I’m going to keep fighting for that."

=== Ontario Provincial Parliament ===
During the first three months of the 42nd Parliament, he was a frequent critic of Premier Doug Ford. As a party leader, Schreiner has been extensively quoted by the news media on issues such as the government's decisions to cancel the province's cap-and-trade legislation, scrapping the green energy programs and rebates, on the tactics used by Ford to reduce the size of Toronto City Council and on the provincial plan to allow marijuana smoking in numerous locations.

He was re-elected in the 2022 Ontario general election. In 2023, Aislinn Clancy became the second elected provincial Green in Ontario and joined Schreiner in Parliament. She was appointed deputy leader before her election.

He kept his seat in Guelph in the 2025 Ontario general election, along with Aislinn Clancy. Prior to the election, Bonnie Crombie declined to form an electoral alliance in select ridings with the Green Party of Ontario.

== Personal life ==
Schreiner lives with his wife Sandy and their two daughters in Toronto and in Guelph.

During 2012 to 2017, he was a contributor to HuffPost Canada, on topics such as water protection, healthy food systems, recycling, climate change, clean tech, transit, energy and carbon pricing.

Schreiner served on the steering committee for Green Enterprise Toronto, an association of over 350 small businesses, and on the Board of Directors of FarmStart, a non-profit that assists new farmers in Ontario, and he is a governor of the Canadian International Peace Project. He is a Rotarian and volunteer on many Guelph initiatives including Hillside Music Festival, Guelph Jazz Festival, Guelph Community Clean up, Guelph Coalition for Active Transportation, and Democracy Guelph.

== Electoral record ==
2025 Ontario general election: Guelph
Party	Candidate	Votes	%	±%	Expenditures
Green	Mike Schreiner	34,238	56.94	+2.49	$91,228
Progressive Conservative	Robert Coole	14,386	23.92	+3.52	$20,305
Liberal	Mustafa Zuberi	6,874	11.43	–1.86	$40,857
New Democratic	Cameron Spence	3,497	5.82	–2.24	$11,248
New Blue	Carina Fraser	1,137	1.89	–1.07	$658
Total valid votes/expense limit		60,132	99.55	–	$190,226
Total rejected, unmarked and declined ballots		270	0.45	–0.03	
Turnout		60,402	51.12	+1.73	
Eligible voters		118,153			
Green hold		Swing		–0.52	
Source: Elections Ontario

2022 Ontario general election: Guelph
Party	Candidate	Votes	%	±%	Expenditures
Green	Mike Schreiner	29,752	54.45	+9.42	$110,235
Progressive Conservative	Peter McSherry	11,149	20.41	–1.40	$3,934
Liberal	Raechelle Devereaux	7,263	13.29	+3.17	$76,859
New Democratic	James Parr	4,402	8.06	–13.51	$41,943
New Blue	Will Lomker	1,619	2.96	–	$2,919
Communist	Juanita Burnett	251	0.46	+0.29	$0
None of the Above	Paul Taylor	202	0.37	–0.18	$0
Total valid votes/expense limit		54,638	99.53	–	$155,606
Total rejected, unmarked and declined ballots		260	0.47	–0.30	
Turnout		54,898	49.39	–11.73	
Eligible voters		111,147			
Green hold		Swing		+5.41	
Source: Elections Ontario

2018 Ontario general election: Guelph
Party	Candidate	Votes	%	±%
Green	Mike Schreiner	29,082	45.03	+25.74
Progressive Conservative	Ray Ferraro	14,084	21.81	+0.97
New Democratic	Agnieszka Mlynarz	13,929	21.57	+3.87
Liberal	Sly Castaldi	6,537	10.12	–31.39
None of the Above	Paul Taylor	358	0.55	–
Libertarian	Michael Riehl	297	0.46	+0.14
Ontario Party	Thomas Mooney	181	0.28	–
Communist	Juanita Burnett	109	0.17	–0.17
Total valid votes		64,577	99.22	
Total rejected, unmarked and declined ballots		505	0.78	–0.27
Turnout		65,082	61.12	+5.65
Eligible voters		106,481		
Green gain from Liberal		Swing		+28.57
Source: Elections Ontario

2014 Ontario general election: Guelph
Party	Candidate	Votes	%	±%
Liberal	Liz Sandals	21,949	41.33	+18.84
Progressive Conservative	Anthony MacDonald	11,179	21.05	−33.54
Green	Mike Schreiner	10,181	19.17	+10.41
New Democratic	James Gordon	9,392	17.68	+3.22
Communist	Juanita Burnett	236	0.44	+0.44
Libertarian	Blair Smythe	168	0.31	+0.31
Source: Elections Ontario

2011 Ontario general election: Simcoe—Grey
Party	Candidate	Votes	%	±%
Progressive Conservative	Jim Wilson	25,396	54.49	13.42
Liberal	Donna Kenwell	10,386	22.49	−21.24
New Democratic	David Matthews	6,738	14.46	+8.48
Green	Mike Schreiner	4,084	8.76	+2.12
Total valid votes			100.0	

Haliburton—Kawartha Lakes—Brock by-election, 5 March 2009 resignation of Laurie Scott
Party	Candidate	Votes	%	±%
Liberal	Rick Johnson	15,482	43.73	+14.22
Progressive Conservative	John Tory	14,576	41.17	−8.73
Green	Mike Schreiner	2,352	6.64	−0.56
New Democratic	Lyn Edwards	2,117	5.98	−5.92
Independent	Jason Taylor	320	0.90	
Family Coalition	Jake Pothaar	258	0.73	−0.07
Freedom	Bill Denby	140	0.40	−0.4
Independent	John Turmel	92	0.26	
Libertarian	Paolo Fabrizio	71	0.20	
