= Local Food Plus =

Local Food Plus (LFP) was a Toronto-based non-profit organization that brought farmers and consumers together to build regional food economies. It created "LFP certified" farmers and processors in Ontario, Atlantic Canada, British Columbia and the Canadian Prairies who used sustainable practices, and helped connect farmers and buyers, in part through a "Buy to Vote" campaign, based on the notion of voting with one's money.

This certification is not as fully considered as, for example, organic certification, but because it considers a wide range of 'ethical' points, the consumer may be able to purchase a well-rounded and 'morally' sound item if it bears the LFP label.

The organization was founded in 2005 by Lori Stahlbrand and Mike Schreiner, and was run by the Land Food People Foundation from 2008. Local Food Plus ceased operation in 2014.

== See also ==
- Food Security
- Sustainable Agriculture
- Foodland Ontario
- Geography of food
- Right to food
- Food rescue
