= Jonah Schein =

Former provincial-level Canadian politician

Ontario MPP
- In office 2011–2014
- Preceded by: Tony Ruprecht
- Succeeded by: Cristina Martins
- Constituency: Davenport

Personal details
- Born: 1974 (age 51–52) Toronto, Ontario, Canada
- Party: New Democrat
- Occupation: Social Worker/Community Activist

Jonah Schein (born c. 1974) is a former politician in Ontario, Canada. He was a New Democratic Party member in the Legislative Assembly of Ontario in the Toronto Davenport riding from 2011 to 2014. Prior to winning the 2011 provincial election, he was also an unsuccessful candidate for municipal office in part of the same electoral district in the 2010 City of Toronto elections.

== Background ==
Schein was born in Toronto in 1974. He worked as a social worker and community organizer dealing with food issues as part of The Stop Community Food Centre between 2005 and 2010.

== Politics ==
In 2010 Schein ran as a candidate for Toronto City Council, finishing second to Cesar Palacio in Ward 17. He helped campaign for fellow New Democrat, Andrew Cash in the federal Davenport district during the winter and spring of 2011, leading up to the 2 May 2011 election, which saw Cash win, a first for the NDP in the federal district. With Cash's support, he ran for the provincial NDP's nomination and became their candidate. The incumbent MPP, Tony Ruprecht surprised the media and the district with his sudden announcement that he would not run in the 2011 provincial election. This left the seat wide-open, and Schein did not have to face the politician that held riding, or parts of it before it became Davenport, since 1981.

In the fall of 2011, Schein ran against Liberal candidate Cristina Martins. One of the main issues in the campaign was the airport rail link along the district's western border, and why it was not going to utilize electric trains. Schein campaigned for an immediate electrification against the Liberals idea of diesel first and electrification later. Schein won by 1,414 votes becoming the first New Democratic to win the provincial district under its current boundaries.

Since being elected, he came out in favour of re-establishing the Toronto Transit Commission's (TTC) provincial operating funding, which covered approximately 50 percent of the TTC's budget, prior to 1997. The subsidy was cut by former Premier Mike Harris's government, in the late 1990s, around the same time that his Conservative government downloaded services to the newly amalgamated City of Toronto.

In the 2014 election he ran against Martins again, this time being defeated by 2,041 votes.

On 18 August 2014, New Democratic Party Leader Andrea Horwath appointed Schein as Special Adviser on Urban Issues. Schein consulted on issues such as public transit, cycling, vulnerable workers and tenant protection. Critics argued that this was a move to shore up support in urban areas where they did poorly in the 2014 election.
