= Tony Ruprecht =

Canadian politician (born 1942)

The Honourable Tony Ruprecht ECO
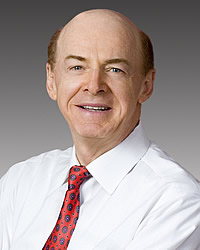
- MPP Tony Ruprecht circa 2007

Ontario MPP
- In office 1999–2011
- Preceded by: New riding
- Succeeded by: Jonah Schein
- Constituency: Davenport
- In office 1981–1999
- Preceded by: Jan Dukszta
- Succeeded by: Riding abolished
- Constituency: Parkdale

Alderman
- In office 1978–1981
- Preceded by: Tony O'Donohue
- Succeeded by: Chris Korwin-Kuczynski
- Constituency: Toronto City Council Ward 2

Personal details
- Born: 12 December 1942 (age 83) Konstantynów, Poland
- Party: Ontario Liberal Party
- Occupation: Teacher
- Portfolio: Minister without portfolio (1985–1987)

Tony Ruprecht (born 12 December 1942) is a Canadian former politician. His first elected position was as an alderman in the old Toronto City Council, in the late 1970s. He became a member of the Legislative Assembly of Ontario in 1981, and served in premier David Peterson's cabinet as minister without portfolio from 1985 to 1987. Ruprecht represented Toronto's Parkdale and then Davenport constituencies for the Liberal Party of Ontario for 30 years. On 5 July 2011, he announced that he was leaving politics and would not seek re-election in the October 2011 provincial election.

== Background ==
Born in Konstantynów, Poland on 12 December 1942, Ruprecht moved to Canada with his family in 1949 after attending school in Germany. He was educated at Laurentian University in Sudbury, Ontario (receiving a Bachelor of Arts degree in 1969), Wichita State University (1971) and Miami University, doing Ph.D. work at the latter institution from 1971 to 1973. He taught in the Political Science department at York University, teaching public administration and municipal governance.

He has authored two books: The Graduate School Game (1976) and Toronto's Many Faces (1990) now in its 5th edition. The latter book being an overview of Toronto's multicultural communities. Ruprecht is also a member of the Knights of Malta. He has received a number of honours from Portugal, Poland, Estonia and the Philippines.

== Toronto alderman ==
Ruprecht made his foray into politics by seeking the Liberal Party of Canada's nomination in the federal Parkdale electoral district, for the 16 October 1978 by-election. He lost the nomination to future Toronto mayor, Art Eggleton. He began his political career at the municipal level, when alderman Tony O'Donohue decided to run for mayor in the 1978 Toronto municipal election. His mayoral campaign meant that he would not seek re-election in his Ward 2 seat, in the Parkdale and Brockton part of Toronto's west-end. Ruprecht decided to run for the vacant alderman position in August. On 13 November 1978, he was elected as one of the Ward's two alderman from a field of ten candidates. By receiving the most votes, he became the senior alderman for Ward 2 on Toronto City Council and Metropolitan Toronto Council. He won re-election as the senior alderman in the 10 November, 1980 Toronto municipal election.

== Provincial politics ==
=== Parkdale constituency (1981–1999) ===
Ruprecht was first elected to the Ontario legislature in the 1981 provincial election, representing the Parkdale constituency defeating incumbent New Democratic Party MPP, Jan Dukszta, by nearly 1,000 votes. Ruprecht was re-elected by a margin of almost 7,000 votes in the 1985 election.

The Liberals formed government after the election, and on 26 June 1985, Ruprecht was appointed as a minister without portfolio responsible for Disabled Persons and Multiculturalism. He was re-elected by a landslide the 1987 election, but was subsequently dropped from cabinet.

The Liberal government called an early election and were defeated by the New Democratic Party (NDP), who formed the government following the 1990 provincial election. Ruprecht managed to retain Parkdale by 523 votes over NDP candidate Sheena Weir, even though most surrounding constituencies were won by the NDP on 6 September 1990. On 8 June 1995, he was re-elected by a greater margin in the 1995 election, as the NDP lost much of its support throughout the province. The Progressive Conservatives won the provincial election, and Ruprecht remained in opposition serving as critic for Citizenship. During his years on the Opposition bench Ruprecht also served variously as Critic for Tourism, Disabilities and Associate Critic for Labour.

In 1996, Ruprecht was the only Liberal MPP outside of Ottawa to support Dalton McGuinty's bid for party leader prior to the actual leadership convention. McGuinty was chosen leader after five ballots.

=== Davenport constituency (1999–2011) ===
Due to Premier Mike Harris' Progressive Conservative government changing Ontario's provincial electoral district boundaries to match the federal ones for the 1999 Ontario general election, the Legislature was reduced to 103 seats, from 130. This boundary change meant that the previous constituencies were redistributed into several of the new ones and incumbent MPPs would have to decide where they would stand for re-election as their old constituencies no longer existed. Ruprecht initially planned to run in the newly created Parkdale—High Park constituency in the 1999 provincial election, but stood aside for star candidate Gerard Kennedy. Kennedy was forced to step aside for former leadership rival Joseph Cordiano in the newly created York South–Weston constituency, because Liberal party leader McGuinty's policies dealing with redistribution and sitting MPPs was to give the senior MPP first choice, and Cordiano was the more senior of those two. Instead, Ruprecht ran in the neighbouring Davenport constituency which included the eastern portion of his old Parkdale constituency. He was not appointed as the Liberal candidate but had to defeat human-rights lawyer Rocco Galati at a nomination meeting on 21 July 1998 before he could run in the election. There was a controversy over the nomination process, and Galati unsuccessfully sued the Liberal party, the constituency association, and Ruprecht.

Ruprecht's main opponent in the 1999 campaign was another displaced incumbent MPP, the NDP's deputy leader, Tony Silipo. What the Toronto Star dubbed "The battle of the Tonys" was expected to be a very close race between Silipo and Ruprecht. Election night, 3 June, was anticlimactic, as Ruprecht easily won with a 4,932 vote plurality. The Progressive Conservatives managed to lose all their seats in the old city of Toronto, but nevertheless, won the provincial election, and Ruprecht remained in opposition.

Ruprecht was elected for a seventh time in the 2003 election, defeating NDP candidate Jordan Berger by over 8,000 votes on 2 October 2003. The McGuinty-lead Liberals formed government following this election after having been in Opposition for 13 years. Despite being the only MPP outside of Ottawa to support McGuinty's leadership campaign, Ruprecht was not appointed to cabinet, but he was appointed vice-chair of the legislature's Standing Committee on Regulations and Private Bills.

In April 2006, Ruprecht was criticized for being absent from the Ontario legislature for extended periods of time while vacationing in Cuba. The MPP acknowledged that since the previous fall he had made four trips to Cuba for a cumulative period of seven weeks. He defended these trips saying he was travelling to the island to receive lessons in Spanish and Portuguese in order to better be able to communicate with his constituents.

In the 2007 provincial election, Ruprecht's margin was reduced to less than 2,000 votes. On 5 July 2011, he announced that he was not running for re-election and would retire. He made this decision, partially because of the unexpected death of fellow Liberal MPP, Bruce Crozier, stating "I have not groomed a successor (in Davenport) simply because Bruce’s death shocked me." The Liberals lost his seat in the ensuing provincial election on 6 October 2011.

== Bibliography ==
- Ruprecht, Tony (2011). Toronto's many faces (5th ed.). Toronto: Dundurn Press. ISBN 978-1-55488-885-6.
