= Monte McNaughton =

Canadian politician (born 1977)

The Honourable Monte McNaughton ECO
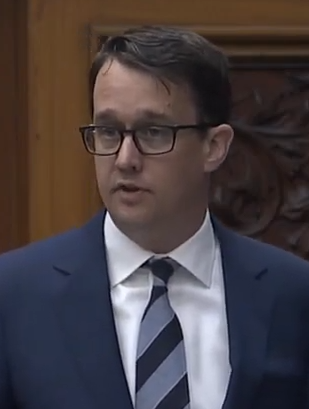
- McNaughton in 2021

Ontario Minister of Labour, Immigration, Training and Skills Development
- In office June 20, 2019 – October 6, 2023
- Premier: Doug Ford
- Preceded by: Laurie Scott
- Succeeded by: David Piccini

Ontario Minister of Infrastructure
- In office June 29, 2018 – June 20, 2019
- Premier: Doug Ford
- Preceded by: Bob Chiarelli
- Succeeded by: Laurie Scott

Member of the Ontario Provincial Parliament for Lambton—Kent—Middlesex
- In office October 6, 2011 – October 6, 2023
- Preceded by: Maria Van Bommel
- Succeeded by: Steve Pinsonneault

Personal details
- Born: Monte Gary McNaughton; March 11, 1977 (age 49) Newbury, Ontario, Canada
- Party: Progressive Conservative
- Spouse: Kate
- Children: 1
- Education: Westervelt College; Ivey Business School
- Occupation: Politician

Monte Gary McNaughton (born March 11, 1977) is a former Canadian politician who served as the minister of labour, immigration, training and skills development in Ontario from June 20, 2019 to September 22, 2023. A Progressive Conservative (PC), McNaughton sat as a member of Provincial Parliament (MPP) and represented the riding Lambton—Kent—Middlesex in the Legislative Assembly of Ontario since the 2011 provincial election. McNaughton first joined the provincial Cabinet in 2018 as the minister of infrastructure.

== Background ==
McNaughton was born in Newbury, Ontario, where his family owned and operated a local shopping centre.

McNaughton was inspired to pursue public service at a young age by his grandfather, Jack McNaughton, who successfully advocated for the construction of a local hospital.

He graduated from Westervelt College and completed executive programs at the Ivey Business School at Western University. From 2009 to 2010, he served as the president of the local chamber of commerce in Strathroy.

McNaughton and his wife Kate have a daughter and live in Mt. Brydges.

== Political career (1997 – 2023) ==
Monte McNaughton began his career in Newbury, Ontario at the age of twenty, as a town councillor. He was elected to that office three times, then running for the legislative assembly In the 2007 provincial election where he was the PC candidate in Lambton—Kent—Middlesex, ultimately losing to the incumbent, Maria Van Bommel of the Ontario Liberal Party. He ran again in the 2011 election, this time winning. He was re-elected in the 2014 election, and again in the 2018 election where his Progressive Conservatives formed government and he was named to newly-elected Premier Doug Ford's Cabinet.

=== In Opposition (2007 – 2018) ===
==== PC leadership campaign (2014 – 2015) ====
On September 17, 2014, McNaughton announced his candidacy for the leadership of the Progressive Conservative Party of Ontario. During his campaign McNaughton received endorsements from Rob Ford, former mayor of Toronto, who called McNaughton a "family man" and "the conservative in the PC leadership race." Ford added, "he will help the little guy and defend the taxpayer."

McNaughton criticized the Liberal government for not consulting with parents when they implemented a new sex education curriculum. He also supported a move to private liquor sales and opposed the LCBO retail model. He said, "If we were to build Ontario again, we wouldn't be building the same communist-style liquor system that we have here in the province."

==== Estate Administration Tax ====
In September 2015, McNaughton proposed legislation to reform the estate administration tax, also known as the death tax. The proposal would exempt low-income earners and charitable donations from the tax, as well as eliminating the related audit and verification authority the Ministry of Finance had recently taken on.

==== Debt Cap ====
In February 2016, McNaughton proposed a private member's bill that would implement a debt cap. The debt cap would stop the government from taking on debt exceeding 45 per cent of the province's gross domestic product (GDP) without the approval of the Legislature.

==== Transparency in Energy Pricing ====
In June 2017, in response to concerns about undisclosed taxation, McNaughton proposed a private member's bill which would mandate that the cost of the province's cap and trade program be disclosed to consumers as a separate line item on natural gas bills.

=== Minister of Infrastructure (2018 – 2019) ===
==== Massey Hall ====
In the fall of 2018, McNaughton announced that the province would support infrastructure investments to renovate and expand Massey Hall, Canada’s oldest concert hall. McNaughton and tourism minister Michael Tibollo announced a full restoration of the exterior and interior of the building, including 100 original stained-glass windows. As well, a new seven-storey tower addition will feature a live-music stage and performance studio. The second phase of the revitalization has a budget of up to $113 million. The renovations were completed in 2021.

==== Natural Gas ====
In the fall of 2018, McNaughton introduced Bill 32, the Access to Natural Gas Act. The legislation makes it possible to expand access to natural gas to more parts of rural and northern Ontario, as well as First Nations communities.

During the winter of 2019, McNaughton announced that Ontario will provide $27 million towards the Nipigon Natural Gas plant, which would convert natural gas into a liquid form, so it could be safely and economically trucked to customers. It would replace costlier fuel sources to more than 550 businesses and 5,000 homes – saving residents an estimated $181.3 million and businesses $65.3 million on energy bills over 40 years. The project will create between 700 and 2,800 jobs in the region.

=== Minister of Labour, Immigration, Training and Skills Development (2019 – 2023) ===
Premier Ford named McNaughton as the minister of labour on June 20, 2019. On October 21, 2019, the training and skills development role was transferred to McNaughton's portfolio from the Minister of Training, Colleges and Universities. McNaughton's new title became Minister of Labour, Training and Skills Development.

==== Labour shortage ====
The province faced a labour shortage during the COVID-19 pandemic. McNaughton sought to address the issue by increasing the number of people immigrating to Ontario, calling on the federal government to double the number of immigrants allowed in the province under the Ontario Immigrant Nominee Program from 9,000 to 18,000 a year.

==== Minimum wage ====
In October 2021, the provincial general minimum wage increased ten cents to $14.35 per hour, and the student and server minimum increased to $13.50 and $12.55 respectively. Amid rising inflation and cost of living, critics dismissed the ten cent increase as being so little, that it was meaningless. Deena Ladd, executive director of the Workers Action Centre pointed out "It's basically an adjustment to deal with inflation," and that "We have a minimum wage that is keeping people at poverty levels."

In response, McNaughton said that he did not want to "create an economy of minimum wage jobs", touting the need to get "people to get the training for in-demand jobs that are going to pay more so they can provide for their families".

The minimum wage was originally set to increase to $15 in 2019, however, the increase was cancelled by the PC government when they took office. Following continued criticism, McNaughton and Premier Ford announced on November 1 that the minimum wage would increase to $15 an hour in 2021. Ford acknowledged that "wages haven't kept up with the increasing cost of living, making it harder than ever to make ends meet".

Unifor president Jerry Dias, who was at the announcement welcomed the news, however, noted that the wage increase was still below a living wage, stating "I think we have to have a living wage. In order to get to a $22 living wage in Toronto, you are going to have to go through $15" further noting that "A living wage in London, Ont. is about $16.20. So do I think $15 is wonderful? The answer is ‘no.’ But do I think it is a good start? The answer is ‘yes’ as we continue to push and fight for a living wage." Opposition leader Andrea Horwath reacted by saying that the increase should be closer to $17 to $17.50 an hour to make up for the “$5,300 that Doug Ford stole” from minimum wage workers when his government cancelled the initial increase to $15 that was scheduled for 2019.

==== Working For Workers Act ====
McNaughton proposed legislation that was passed on November 30, 2021, which would ban non-compete clauses in employment contracts, and require employers with more than 24 employees to have a written policy about employees' rights when it comes to disconnecting from their job at the end of the day. Policies could include expectations about response time for emails. Ontario is the first jurisdiction in Canada to ban non-compete clauses.

==== Tim Hortons hiring issues ====
In December 2021, McNaughton shared his thoughts on difficulties faced by some Tim Hortons franchises in hiring staff. He called on employers, including Tim Hortons to step up and pay workers more. He noted that "businesses that are paying workers well, that are providing benefits and in some cases pensions, those businesses are going to have a competitive advantage".

=== Resignation ===
On October 6, 2023, McNaughton resigned in order to accept a job in the private sector at Woodbine Entertainment Group as executive vice-president of industry relations and people experience. A provincial by-election to replace him was held on May 2, 2024.

== Electoral record ==
2022 Ontario general election: Lambton—Kent—Middlesex
| Party | Candidate | Votes | % | ±% | Expenditures |
|---|---|---|---|---|---|
| Progressive Conservative | Monte McNaughton | 24,933 | 58.81 | +3.46 | $86,631 |
| New Democratic | Vanessa Benoit | 7,987 | 18.84 | –14.48 | $66,308 |
| Liberal | Bruce Baker | 4,063 | 9.58 | +3.35 | $0 |
| New Blue | David Barnwell | 2,701 | 6.37 | – | $3,090 |
| Green | Wanda Dickey | 1,688 | 3.98 | +0.69 | $381 |
| Ontario Party | Aaron Istvan Vegh | 727 | 1.71 | – | $0 |
| None of the Above | Dean Eve | 300 | 0.71 | – | $283 |
| Total valid votes/expense limit | | 42,399 | 99.41 | – | $126,309 |
| Total rejected, unmarked and declined ballots | | 253 | 0.59 | –0.63 | |
| Turnout | | 42,652 | 47.28 | –13.50 | |
| Eligible voters | | 90,221 | | | |
| Progressive Conservative hold | | Swing | | ▲8.97 | |
Source: Elections Ontario

2018 Ontario general election: Lambton—Kent—Middlesex
| Party | Candidate | Votes | % | ±% |
|---|---|---|---|---|
| Progressive Conservative | Monte McNaughton | 27,906 | 55.34 | +10.17 |
| New Democratic | Todd Case | 16,800 | 33.32 | +6.80 |
| Liberal | Mike Radan | 3,143 | 6.23 | -14.05 |
| Green | Anthony Li | 1,660 | 3.29 | -1.30 |
| Trillium | Brian Everaert | 555 | 1.10 | |
| Libertarian | Brad Greulich | 360 | 0.71 | +0.26 |
| Total valid votes | | 50,424 | 100.0 | |
| Progressive Conservative hold | | Swing | | |
Source: Elections Ontario

2014 Ontario general election: Lambton—Kent—Middlesex
| Party | Candidate | Votes | % | ±% |
|---|---|---|---|---|
| Progressive Conservative | Monte McNaughton | 20,609 | 45.06 | -0.67 |
| New Democratic | Joe Hill | 12,157 | 26.58 | +5.62 |
| Liberal | Mike Radan | 9,297 | 20.33 | -8.99 |
| Green | James Armstrong | 2,104 | 4.60 | +2.27 |
| Family Coalition | Marinus Vander Vloet | 560 | 1.22 | +0.39 |
| None of the Above | Bob Lewis | 522 | 1.21 | |
| Freedom | Tom Jackson | 242 | 0.53 | +0.25 |
| Libertarian | Matt Willson | 213 | 0.47 | |
| Total valid votes | | 45,733 | 100.00 | |

2011 Ontario general election: Lambton—Kent—Middlesex
| Party | Candidate | Votes | % | ±% |
|---|---|---|---|---|
| Progressive Conservative | Monte McNaughton | 19,379 | 45.73 | +9.41 |
| Liberal | Maria Van Bommel | 12,423 | 29.32 | -13.91 |
| New Democratic | Joe Hill | 8,882 | 20.96 | +10.21 |
| Green | James Armstrong | 987 | 2.33 | -5.57 |
| Family Coalition | Marinus Vander Vloet | 350 | 0.83 | -0.47 |
| Reform | Brad Harness | 232 | 0.55 | +0.06 |
| Freedom | Tom Jackson | 119 | 0.28 | |
| Total valid votes | | 42,372 | 100.00 | |

2007 Ontario general election: Lambton—Kent—Middlesex
| Party | Candidate | Votes | % | ±% |
|---|---|---|---|---|
| Liberal | Maria Van Bommel | 18,191 | 43.23 | -1.88 |
| Progressive Conservative | Monte McNaughton | 15,281 | 36.32 | -0.34 |
| New Democratic | Joyce Jolliffe | 4,522 | 10.75 | -0.26 |
| Green | James Armstrong | 3,326 | 7.90 | +5.14 |
| Family Coalition | Bill McMaster | 547 | 1.30 | |
| Reform | Brad Harness | 208 | 0.49 | |
| Total valid votes | | 42,075 | 100.00 | |
