= 39th Parliament of Ontario =

Parliamentary session of the Ontario Provincial Parliament

←	38th	40th	→
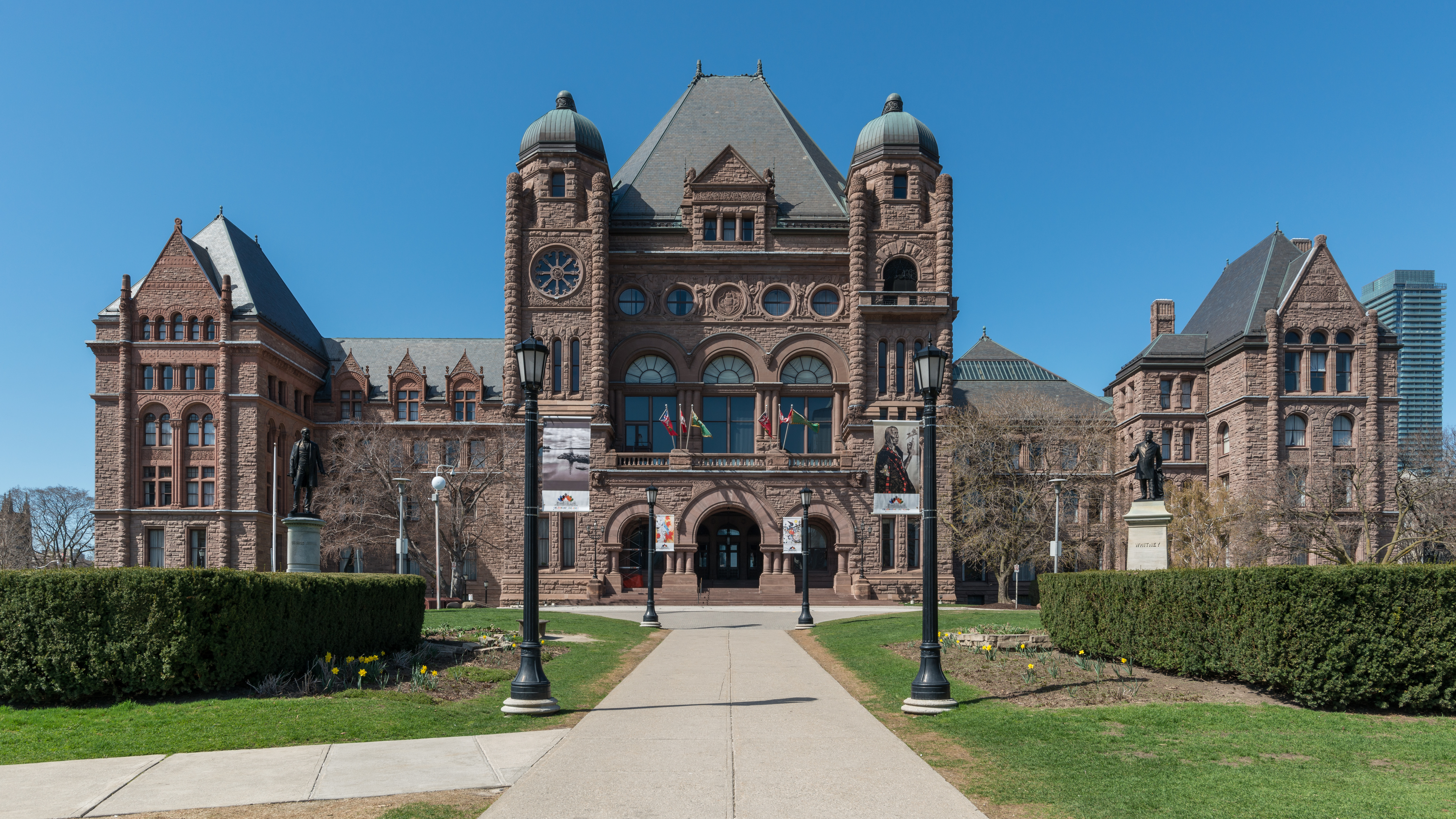
- Ontario Legislative Building, Toronto

Overview
- Legislative body: Legislative Assembly
- Jurisdiction: Ontario, Canada
- Meeting place: Ontario Legislative Building, Queen's Park, Toronto
- Term: October 10, 2007 – September 7, 2011
- Election: 2007 Ontario Election
- Government: McGuinty ministry, Liberal
- Opposition: Progressive Conservative; New Democratic Party
- Members: 107
- Speaker: Steve Peters
- Premier: Dalton McGuinty
- Leader of the Opposition: Bob Runciman (to 2009); Tim Hudak (from 2009)
- Leader, 3rd party: Howard Hampton (to 2009); Andrea Horwath (from 2009)
Party control
Liberal Majority: 71/107

Sessions
- 1st: November 29, 2007 – March 4, 2010
- 2nd: March 8, 2010 – June 1, 2011

The 39th Parliament of Ontario (or the 39th Ontario Legislature) was the provincial legislature of Ontario that was in office between October 2007 and September 2011. Its composition was initially determined by the Ontario general election held on October 10, 2007. The incumbent governing party from the 38th Parliament, the Ontario Liberal Party led by Dalton McGuinty, retained their majority position in the 39th Parliament with just over two-third of the seats in the legislature, enabling the McGuinty ministry to continue in office through the duration of the 39th Parliament.

The Progressive Conservative Party formed the Official Opposition, with veteran member Bob Runciman serving as leader of the opposition initially due to party leader John Tory failure in winning a seats in either the 2007 general election or the subsequent byelection. Tim Hudak was elected party leader in 2009 and became leader of the opposition. The New Democratic Party was also recognized as an opposition party, and its leadership also transitioned in 2009, from Howard Hampton to Andrea Horwath.

The 39th Parliament officially opened on November 29, 2007 and elected Steve Peters as its speaker. It was formally dissolved on September 7, 2011 following the prorogation of its second session on June 1, 2011.

== Sessions ==
The 39th parliament formally held two sessions.

- 1st session: November 29, 2007 – March 4, 2010
- 2nd session: March 8, 2010 – June 1, 2011

It however did not sit continuously through each session, but adjourned for extended period at various point. After ten days of sitting in later 2007, it did not sit until March 17 the following year. The legislature also stood adjourned from mid June to mid September in each of 2008, 2009, and 2010, and from mid December to later January or February each year.

It however recessed over only a weekend between the prorogation of the first session and the opening of the session session.

== Timeline of the 39th Parliament of Ontario ==
- November 28, 2007: The legislature conducted a secret vote to elect the Speaker of the legislature. Liberal Party of Ontario Member of Provincial Parliament (MPP) Steve Peters is elected as Speaker defeating incumbent Michael A. Brown. The former labour minister defeated Brown and three other candidates after four ballots.
- November 29, 2007: The session officially opened with the Speech from the Throne.
- February 23, 2008: John Tory's continued leadership of the Progressive Conservative party was endorsed by 66.9% of delegates at a leadership review.
- June 14, 2008: NDP leader Howard Hampton announced he would step down as party leader at the March 7, 2009 NDP leadership convention.
- June 20, 2008: A mini-cabinet shuffle of the Executive Council of Ontario saw David Caplan sworn in as Minister of Health and George Smitherman becoming Minister of Energy and Infrastructure.
- January 9, 2009: Progressive Conservative MPP Laurie Scott announced her resignation from the legislature to allow party leader John Tory, who had been without a seat since his defeat in Don Valley West in the 2007 election, to re-enter the legislature.
- March 5, 2009: In the Haliburton—Kawartha Lakes—Brock by-election following Scott's resignation, Tory was defeated by Liberal candidate Rick Johnson.
- March 6, 2009: John Tory resigned as Progressive Conservative leader pending the selection of an interim party leader.
- March 7, 2009: Andrea Horwath was elected leader of the Ontario NDP at the party's 2009 leadership convention.
- June 27, 2009: Tim Hudak was elected leader of the Progressive Conservative party at its 2009 leadership election and also became the new Leader of the Opposition.
- September 17, 2009: Eric Hoskins was elected as the MPP for the riding of St. Paul's following the resignation of Michael Bryant on June 7, 2009.
- February 4, 2010: Glenn Murray was elected as the MPP for the riding of Toronto-Centre following the resignation of George Smitherman on January 4, 2010.

== Party standings ==
Affiliation	Leader of the Party	Leader in the Legislature	OntLA Status	Members
Liberal	Dalton McGuinty		Government	71
Progressive Conservative	Tim Hudak		Official Opposition	25
New Democratic	Andrea Horwath		Third Party	10
Vacant				1
Total				107
Government Majority				37

=== Seating plan ===
			Murdoch	Martiniuk	Clark	Bailey	Shurman	Savoline	Jones	Ouellette	Gélinas	P. Miller			Pendergast	Johnson
		O'Toole	Hillier	Chudleigh	Arnott	Dunlop	Hardeman	MacLeod	Munro	Barrett	Prue	DiNovo	Tabuns	Bisson	Jaczek	Magnat	Moridi	Naqvi
			Wilson	Sterling	Witmer	N. Miller	Elliott	Hudak	Yakabuski	Klees	Kormos	Horwath	Marchese	Hampton	Balkissoon	Albanese	Carroll	Dickson
Peters
			Smith	Bradley	Dombrowsky	Philips	Duncan	McGuinty	Pupatello	Matthews	Wynne	Gerretsen	Ruprecht	Kwinter	Ramsay	Sorbara
	Leal	Brown	Takhar	Aggelonitis	Bentley	Bartolucci	Best	Duguid	Meilleur	Milloy	Hoskins	Gravelle	Crozier	Colle	Hoy	Lalonde
	Sergio	Caplan	Murray	Chiarelli	Jeffrey	Wilkinson	Mitchell	Broten	Chan	Sousa	McMeekin	Levac	Arthurs	Berardinetti	Brownell	Cansfield
	Craitor	Delaney	Dhillon	Flynn	Fonseca	Kular	Mauro	McNeely	Orazietti	Qaadri	Ramal	Rinaldi	Sandals	VanBommel	Zimmer		Peters

== List of members ==
Name	Party	Riding	First elected / previously elected	No. of terms	Notes
Joe Dickson	Liberal	Ajax—Pickering	2007	1st term	
Mike Brown	Liberal	Algoma—Manitoulin	1987	6th term	
Ted McMeekin	Liberal	Ancaster—Dundas—Flamborough—Westdale	2000	3rd term	
Aileen Carroll	Liberal	Barrie	2007	1st term	
Michael Prue	New Democrat	Beaches—East York	2001	3rd term	
Kuldip Kular	Liberal	Bramalea—Gore—Malton	2003	2nd term	
Linda Jeffrey	Liberal	Brampton—Springdale	2003	2nd term	
Vic Dhillon	Liberal	Brampton West	2003	2nd term	
Dave Levac	Liberal	Brant	1999	3rd term	
Bill Murdoch	Progressive Conservative	Bruce—Grey—Owen Sound	1990	5th term	Removed from caucus September 12, 2008; rejoined April 23, 2009; Suspended from the Legislature, November 30, 2009, pursuant to S.O. 15(c)
Bill Murdoch	Independent	Bruce—Grey—Owen Sound	1990	5th term	Removed from caucus September 12, 2008; rejoined April 23, 2009; Suspended from the Legislature, November 30, 2009, pursuant to S.O. 15(c)
Bill Murdoch	Progressive Conservative	Bruce—Grey—Owen Sound	1990	5th term	Removed from caucus September 12, 2008; rejoined April 23, 2009; Suspended from the Legislature, November 30, 2009, pursuant to S.O. 15(c)
Joyce Savoline	Progressive Conservative	Burlington	2007	2nd term	
Gerry Martiniuk	Progressive Conservative	Cambridge	1995	4th term	
Norm Sterling	Progressive Conservative	Carleton—Mississippi Mills	1977	9th term	
Pat Hoy	Liberal	Chatham-Kent—Essex	1995	4th term	
Tony Ruprecht	Liberal	Davenport	1981	8th term	
David Caplan	Liberal	Don Valley East	1997	4th term	
Kathleen Wynne	Liberal	Don Valley West	2003	2nd term	
Sylvia Jones	Progressive Conservative	Dufferin—Caledon	2007	1st term	
John O'Toole	Progressive Conservative	Durham	1995	4th term	
Mike Colle	Liberal	Eglinton—Lawrence	1995	4th term	
Steve Peters	Liberal	Elgin—Middlesex—London	1999	3rd term	Speaker
Bruce Crozier	Liberal	Essex	1993	5th term	Died June 3, 2011.
Donna Cansfield	Liberal	Etobicoke Centre	2003	2nd term	
Laurel Broten	Liberal	Etobicoke—Lakeshore	2003	2nd term	
Shafiq Qaadri	Liberal	Etobicoke North	2003	2nd term	
Jean-Marc Lalonde	Liberal	Glengarry—Prescott—Russell	1995	4th term	
Liz Sandals	Liberal	Guelph	2003	2nd term	
Toby Barrett	Progressive Conservative	Haldimand—Norfolk	1995	4th term	
Laurie Scott	Progressive Conservative	Haliburton—Kawartha Lakes—Brock	2003	2nd term	Resigned on January 9, 2009.
Rick Johnson (2009)	Liberal	Haliburton—Kawartha Lakes—Brock	2009	1st term	Elected March 5, 2009.
Ted Chudleigh	Progressive Conservative	Halton	1995	4th term	
Andrea Horwath	New Democrat	Hamilton Centre	2004	2nd term	Leader of the New Democratic Party from March 7, 2009.
Paul Miller	New Democrat	Hamilton East—Stoney Creek	2007	1st term	
Sophia Aggelonitis	Liberal	Hamilton Mountain	2007	1st term	
Carol Mitchell	Liberal	Huron—Bruce	2003	2nd term	
Howard Hampton	New Democrat	Kenora—Rainy River	1987	6th term	Leader of the New Democratic Party to March 7, 2009.
John Gerretsen	Liberal	Kingston and the Islands	1995	4th term	
John Milloy	Liberal	Kitchener Centre	2003	2nd term	
Leeanna Pendergast	Liberal	Kitchener—Conestoga	2007	1st term	
Elizabeth Witmer	Progressive Conservative	Kitchener—Waterloo	1990	5th term	
Maria Van Bommel	Liberal	Lambton—Kent—Middlesex	2003	2nd term	
Randy Hillier	Progressive Conservative	Lanark—Frontenac—Lennox and Addington	2007	1st term	Suspended from the Legislature, November 30, 2009, pursuant to S.O. 15(c)
Bob Runciman	Progressive Conservative	Leeds—Grenville	1981	8th term	Interim Leader of the Opposition until June 27, 2009. Resigned January 29, 2010 to accept appointment to the Senate of Canada.
Steve Clark (2010)	Progressive Conservative	Leeds—Grenville	2010	1st term	Elected March 4, 2010
Khalil Ramal	Liberal	London—Fanshawe	2003	2nd term	
Deb Matthews	Liberal	London North Centre	2003	2nd term	
Chris Bentley	Liberal	London West	2003	2nd term	
Michael Chan	Liberal	Markham—Unionville	2007	2nd term	
Amrit Mangat	Liberal	Mississauga—Brampton South	2007	1st term	
Peter Fonseca	Liberal	Mississauga East—Cooksville	2003	2nd term	
Harinder Takhar	Liberal	Mississauga—Erindale	2003	2nd term	
Charles Sousa	Liberal	Mississauga South	2007	1st term	
Bob Delaney	Liberal	Mississauga—Streetsville	2003	2nd term	
Lisa MacLeod	Progressive Conservative	Nepean—Carleton	2006	2nd term	
Frank Klees	Progressive Conservative	Newmarket—Aurora	1995	4th term	
Kim Craitor	Liberal	Niagara Falls	2003	2nd term	
Tim Hudak	Progressive Conservative	Niagara West—Glanbrook	1995	4th term	Leader of the Opposition and leader of the Progressive Conservatives from June 27, 2009
France Gélinas	New Democrat	Nickel Belt	2007	1st term	
Monique Smith	Liberal	Nipissing	2003	2nd term	
Lou Rinaldi	Liberal	Northumberland—Quinte West	2003	2nd term	
Helena Jaczek	Liberal	Oak Ridges—Markham	2007	1st term	
Kevin Flynn	Liberal	Oakville	2003	2nd term	
Jerry Ouellette	Progressive Conservative	Oshawa	1995	4th term	
Yasir Naqvi	Liberal	Ottawa Centre	2007	1st term	
Phil McNeely	Liberal	Ottawa—Orléans	2003	2nd term	
Dalton McGuinty	Liberal	Ottawa South	1990	5th term	Premier, leader of the Liberal Party.
Madeleine Meilleur	Liberal	Ottawa—Vanier	2003	2nd term	
Jim Watson	Liberal	Ottawa West—Nepean	2003	2nd term	Resigned February 1, 2010.
Bob Chiarelli (2010)	Liberal	Ottawa West—Nepean	1987, 2010	4th term*	Elected March 4, 2010
Ernie Hardeman	Progressive Conservative	Oxford	1995	4th term	
Cheri DiNovo	New Democrat	Parkdale—High Park	2006	2nd term	
Norm Miller	Progressive Conservative	Parry Sound-Muskoka	2001	3rd term	
John Wilkinson	Liberal	Perth Wellington	2003	2nd term	
Jeff Leal	Liberal	Peterborough	2003	2nd term	
Wayne Arthurs	Liberal	Pickering—Scarborough East	2003	2nd term	
Leona Dombrowsky	Liberal	Prince Edward—Hastings	1999	3rd term	
John Yakabuski	Progressive Conservative	Renfrew—Nipissing—Pembroke	2003	2nd term	
Reza Moridi	Liberal	Richmond Hill	2007	1st term	
Jim Bradley	Liberal	St. Catharines	1977	9th term	
Michael Bryant	Liberal	St. Paul's	1999	3rd term	Resigned June 7, 2009.
Eric Hoskins (2009)	Liberal	St. Paul's	2009	1st term	Elected September 17, 2009.
Bob Bailey	Progressive Conservative	Sarnia—Lambton	2007	1st term	
David Orazietti	Liberal	Sault Ste. Marie	2003	2nd term	
Gerry Phillips	Liberal	Scarborough—Agincourt	1987	6th term	
Brad Duguid	Liberal	Scarborough Centre	2003	2nd term	
Margarett Best	Liberal	Scarborough-Guildwood	2007	1st term	
Bas Balkissoon	Liberal	Scarborough—Rouge River	2005	2nd term	
Lorenzo Berardinetti	Liberal	Scarborough Southwest	2003	2nd term	
Jim Wilson	Progressive Conservative	Simcoe—Grey	1990	5th term	
Garfield Dunlop	Progressive Conservative	Simcoe North	1999	3rd term	
Jim Brownell	Liberal	Stormont—Dundas—South Glengarry	2003	2nd term	
Rick Bartolucci	Liberal	Sudbury	1995	4th term	
Peter Shurman	Progressive Conservative	Thornhill	2007	1st term	
Bill Mauro	Liberal	Thunder Bay—Atikokan	2003	2nd term	
Michael Gravelle	Liberal	Thunder Bay—Superior North	1995	4th term	
David Ramsay	Liberal (Note: First elected as a New Democrat)	Timiskaming—Cochrane	1985	7th term	
Gilles Bisson	New Democrat	Timmins—James Bay	1990	5th term	
George Smitherman	Liberal	Toronto Centre	1999	3rd term	Resigned January 4, 2010.
Glen Murray (2010)	Liberal	Toronto Centre	2010	1st term	Elected February 4, 2010.
Peter Tabuns	New Democrat	Toronto—Danforth	2006	2nd term	
Rosario Marchese	New Democrat	Trinity—Spadina	1990	5th term	
Greg Sorbara	Liberal	Vaughan	1985, (Note: York North/York Centre) 2002	6th term*	
Peter Kormos	New Democrat	Welland	1988	6th term	
Ted Arnott	Progressive Conservative	Wellington—Halton Hills	1990	5th term	
Christine Elliott	Progressive Conservative	Whitby—Oshawa	2006	2nd term	
David Zimmer	Liberal	Willowdale	2003	2nd term	
Dwight Duncan	Liberal	Windsor—Tecumseh	1995	4th term	
Sandra Pupatello	Liberal	Windsor West	1995	4th term	
Monte Kwinter	Liberal	York Centre	1985	7th term	
Julia Munro	Progressive Conservative	York—Simcoe	1995	4th term	
Laura Albanese	Liberal	York South—Weston	2007	1st term	
Mario Sergio	Liberal	York West	1995	4th term	

== Changes ==
=== Party standing ===
Number of members per party by date	2007	2008	2009					2010					2011	
Number of members per party by date	Oct 10	Sep 12	Jan 9	Mar 5	Apr 23	Jun 7	Sep 17	Jan 4	Jan 29	Feb 1	Feb 4	Mar 4	Mar 26	Jun 3
Liberal	71			72		71	72	71		70	71	72	71	70
Progressive Conservative	26	25	24		25				24			25		
NDP	10													
Independent	0	1			0									
Total members	107		106	107		106	107	106	105	104	105	107	106	105
Vacant	0		1	0		1	0	1	2	3	2	0	1	2
Government Majority	35		36	37		36	37	36	37	36	37		36	35

=== Changes of membership and party affiliations ===
seat changed hand after by-election
involuntary departure
Liberal
New Democratic
Progressive Conservative
Independent

39th Ontario Parliament (2007–11) - Membership and party affiliation changes
Electoral District	Before			Change	
Electoral District	Date	Reason	Member exited	New member	Date
Bruce—Grey—Owen Sound	Sep 12, 2008	Caucus suspension/re-admission	Bill Murdoch		April 23, 2009
Haliburton—Kawartha Lakes—Brock	Jan 9, 2009	Resignation: open seat for party leader (Note: PC party leader John Tory failed to win a seat in the preceding 2007 election. Scott vacated her seat to provide Tory an opportunity to enter the legislature and was appointed Tory's chief of staff. Tory however failed to win the by-election and resigned as leader)	Laurie Scott	Rick Johnson	March 5, 2009
St. Paul's	June 7, 2009	Resignation: for other employment (Note: CEO of Invest Toronto)	Michael Bryant	Eric Hoskins	Sep 17, 2009
Toronto Centre	Jan 4, 2010	Resignation: to contest Toronto Mayoralty	George Smitherman	Glen Murray	Feb 4, 2010
Leeds—Grenville	Jan 29, 2010	Appointment: Senator for Ontario	Bob Runciman	Steve Clark	March 4, 2010
Ottawa West—Nepean	Feb 1, 2010	Resignation: to contest Ottawa Mayoralty	Jim Watson	Bob Chiarelli	March 4, 2010
Mississauga East—Cooksville	Mar 26, 2011	Resignation: to contest federal election	Peter Fonseca	Vacant at dissolution	
Essex	June 3, 2011	Death (Note: Died from an aortic aneurysm)	Bruce Crozier	Vacant at dissolution	

== Office holders ==
- Speaker: Steve Peters
- Premier: Dalton McGuinty (Liberal)
- Government House Leader: Monique Smith (Liberal)
- Deputy Government House Leader: Gerry Phillips (Liberal)
- Leader of the Opposition: Tim Hudak (PC)
- Opposition House Leader: John Yakabuski
- Leader of the Third Party: Andrea Horwath (NDP)
- House Leader of the Third Party: Peter Kormos (NDP)

== Major legislation ==
- Bill 8, Food for Healthy Schools Act, 2008, Royal Assent April 27, 2008
- Bill 48, Payday Loans Act, 2008, Royal Assent June 18, 2008
- Bill 50, Provincial Animal Welfare Act, 2008, Second Reading, May 27, 20085,
- Bill 55, Ontario French-language Educational Communications Authority Act, 2008, Royal Assent June 18, 2008
- Bill 64, Cosmetic Pesticides Ban Act, 2008, Royal Assent June 18, 2008
- Bill 66, Toronto Public Transit Service Resumption Act, 2008, Royal Assent April 27, 2008
- Bill 90, Colleges Collective Bargaining Act, 2008, Second Reading June 12, 2008

== Committees ==
There are two forms which committees can take. The first, standing committees, are struck for the duration of the Parliament pursuant to Standing Orders. The second, select committees, are struck usually by a Motion or an Order of the House to consider a specific Bill or issue which would otherwise monopolize the time of the standing committees.

=== Standing Committees ===
Standing committees in the current Parliament

- Standing Committee on Estimates
- Standing Committee on Finance and Economic Affairs
- Standing Committee on General Government
- Standing Committee on Government Agencies
- Standing Committee on Social Policy
- Standing Committee on Justice Policy
- Standing Committee on Public Accounts
- Standing Committee on Regulations and Private Bills
- Standing Committee on the Legislative Assembly

Select committees in the current Parliament

The 39th Parliament had 3 select committees.

- The Select Committee on Elections was struck, by a motion of the House, on June 11, 2008. It completed its work on June 29, 2009.
- The Select Committee on Mental Health and Addictions was struck, by a motion of the House, on February 24, 2009. It completed its work on August 24, 2010.
- The Select Committee on the proposed transaction of the TMX Group and the London Stock Exchange Group was struck, by a motion of the House, on February 23, 2011. It completed its work on April 19, 2011.
