= Anderson University =

Anderson University may refer to:

- Anderson University (Indiana), in Anderson, Indiana, U.S.
- Anderson University (South Carolina), in Anderson, South Carolina, U.S.
- Anderson's University, a former name of the University of Strathclyde, Glascow, Scotland
- Anderson College of Health, Business and Technology, in Toronto, Ontario, Canada, formerly the National Academy of Health & Business
