= Lambton—Kent—Middlesex =

Lambton—Kent—Middlesex could refer to:

- Lambton—Kent—Middlesex (federal electoral district)
- Lambton—Kent—Middlesex (provincial electoral district)
