= Donald Abel =

Canadian politician

Don Abel

Ontario MPP
- In office 1990–1995
- Preceded by: Chris Ward
- Succeeded by: Toni Skarica
- Constituency: Wentworth North

Personal details
- Born: Donald Clarke Abel; February 4, 1952 (age 74) Hamilton, Ontario, Canada
- Party: New Democratic
- Spouse: Debra
- Children: 2
- Occupation: Business Owner, Retired Municipal Officer

Donald "Don" Clarke Abel (born February 4, 1952) is a former politician in Ontario, Canada. He was elected as an Ontario New Democratic Party MPP to the Legislative Assembly of Ontario representing the riding of Wentworth North from 1990 to 1995.

== Background ==
Abel studied economics, industrial sociology, political science, labour history and labour law at the Labour College of Canada in Ottawa. He worked in the purchasing and plant management department of the Wentworth County Board of Education and served 10 years as Local 1572 president of the Canadian Union of Public Employees (CUPE). He also served as a National Service Representative for CUPE prior to his election to the provincial legislature.

In 1992, while in office, Abel's teenaged son Mark was seriously injured in a skiing accident in New York State. He was left paralyzed from the chest down. The family was left with $50,000 in medical bills which was eventually paid with funds raised amongst the local community and donations from all three parties of the Legislative Assembly.

== Politics ==
In the 1990 provincial election Abel ran as the New Democrat candidate in the riding of Wentworth North defeating incumbent government house leader, Chris Ward. Later that same year, Abel introduced Bill 22, Deaf Persons' Rights Act, a private member's bill providing rights for hearing-ear dogs, similar to seeing-eye dogs. Although it received second reading and passage through the Social Development Committee the following year, it failed to pass through the legislature before the government was defeated in the 1995 election.

Abel served as both deputy whip and whip during his tenure. He also served as chair of the NDP's caucus personnel committee and as a member of the standing committees on general government, regulations and private bills, finance and economic affairs, estimates and the standing committee on the ombudsman.

In 1994, Abel was one of twelve NDP members to vote against Bill 167, a bill extending financial benefits to same-sex partners. Premier Bob Rae allowed a free vote on the bill which allowed members of his party to vote with their conscience. The bill was defeated by a vote of 68-59.

He ran for mayor of Dundas in the final municipal election before the amalgamation of Hamilton-Wentworth, but lost to incumbent mayor John Addison.

In the 2011 provincial election, Abel ran as the New Democratic candidate for the riding of Haliburton—Kawartha Lakes—Brock. This placed him in a race with two other candidates with parliamentary experience. Although finishing in third place, the Haliburton-Kawartha Lakes-Brock NDP received its highest number of votes since the 1990 provincial election with an 11.32% increase in popular vote from the previous provincial election.

He ran again in the 2014 provincial election with an additional 2.44% increase in popular vote.

== After politics ==
After his defeat in 1995, Abel established the Dundas Review, a weekly community newspaper in Dundas, Ontario. He later worked for the City of Kawartha Lakes as Senior Licensing Officer/Municipal Law Enforcement Officer and Deputy Division Registrar until his retirement in 2012.

== Electoral record ==
=== Wentworth North ===
1990 Ontario general election
Party	Candidate	Votes	%	±%
New Democratic	Don Abel	11,472	34.05	+11.85
Liberal	Chris Ward	11,384	33.79	-20.21
Progressive Conservative	Don Matthews	8,740	25.94	+2.14
Family Coalition	Rien Vanden Enden	1,236	3.67	0
Confederation of Regions	Eileen Butson	860	2.55	0
Total valid votes		33,692	100.00	

1995 Ontario general election
Party	Candidate	Votes	%	±%
Progressive Conservative	Toni Skarica	21,165	55.65	+29.71
Liberal	Chris Ward	10,393	27.33	-6.46
New Democratic	Don Abel	6,474	17.02	-17.03
Total valid votes		38,032	100.00	

=== Haliburton—Kawartha Lakes—Brock ===
2011 Ontario general election
Party	Candidate	Votes	%	±%
Progressive Conservative	Laurie Scott	22,357	45.4	+4.3
Liberal	Rick Johnson	16,522	33.6	-10.13
New Democratic	Don Abel	8,517	17.3	+11.32
Green	Anita Payne	1,562	3.2	+3.44
Freedom	Charles Olito	254	0.5	+0.1
Total valid votes		49,212	100.00	

2014 Ontario general election
Party	Candidate	Votes	%	±%
Progressive Conservative	Laurie Scott	21,641	40.96	-4.44
Liberal	Rick Johnson	18,512	35.03	+1.43
New Democratic	Don Abel	10,431	19.74	+2.44
Green	Arsalan Ahmad	2,255	4.27	+1.07
Total valid votes		52,839	100.00	
