= 2024 Lambton—Kent—Middlesex provincial by-election =

Provincial by-election in Ontario, Canada

- May 2, 2024

Riding of Lambton—Kent—Middlesex
- Turnout: 30.25% (▼17.08)
	First party	Second party
	PC	LIB
Candidate	Steve Pinsonneault	Cathy Burghardt-Jesson
Party	Progressive Conservative	Liberal
Last election	58.81%	9.58%
Popular vote	15,649	6,208
Percentage	56.85%	22.55%
Swing	▼1.96	▲12.97
	Third party	Fourth party
	NDP	NBP
Candidate	Kathryn Shailer	Keith Benn
Party	New Democratic	New Blue
Last election	18.84%	6.37%
Popular vote	2,973	1,513
Percentage	10.80%	5.50%
Swing	▼8.04	▼0.87
MPP before election
Monte McNaughton
Progressive Conservative
Elected MPP
Steve Pinsonneault
Progressive Conservative

A by-election was held in the provincial riding of Lambton—Kent—Middlesex in Ontario on May 2, 2024, to elect a new member of the Legislative Assembly of Ontario following the resignation of Progressive Conservative MPP and cabinet minister Monte McNaughton.

Monte McNaughton resigned for a private sector position as executive vice-president of industry relations and people experience for Woodbine Entertainment Group.

Advance voting took place from April 21-26, 2024 in Wallaceburg and Strathroy.

It was held the same day as the 2024 Milton provincial by-election.

== Candidates ==
=== Progressive Conservative ===
On 27 January 2024, Steve Pinsonneault, a Chatham-Kent councillor for 17 years in Ward 3 (Kent East) and businessman in Thamesville, beat Neal Roberts, chief of the Middlesex London Paramedic Service. Pinsonneault has received criticism from various media sources and the ultra conservative Campaign Life Coalition for his support of pay suspension of fellow Chatham-Kent councillor Rhonda Jubenville. This was in response to her conduct following her support of a ban on non-official flags, including pride flags, on municipal property.

=== New Democratic Party ===
Kathryn Shailer was elected in Watford on February 15th to take up the New Democratic Banner. Shailer is from Alvinston. In the fall of 2022, Shailer ran for Lambton-Kent District School Board trustee in Central Lambton. She was unsuccessful in that bid. Shailer, a mother of two, and has been involved with the Brooke-Alvinston Optimist Club, Friends of Campbell Park, the Lawrence House Centre for the Arts, Alvinston Arts and Music Festival and Community Friendship Meals at Bothwell United Church. Shailer opposes the Dresden, Ontario landfill expansion. Shailer supports keeping Strathroy hospitals labour and delivery program alive in Strathroy-Caradoc instead of forcing residents to go to St. Thomas, Ontario or London, Ontario.

=== Liberal ===
Cathy Burghardt-Jesson is running for the Liberal Party of Ontario. She currently serves as the mayor of Lucan-Biddulph and deputy warden for Middlesex County. She was first elected to be deputy mayor of Lucan-Biddulph in 2010, has been mayor since 2014 and was warden of Middlesex County for three one year terms until becoming deputy warden for 2024.

=== New Blue ===
Keith Benn, a geoscientist and local of Wallaceburg, is running an anti-establishment campaign with a reported focus on local issues, affordability, and providing a "classical conservative" approach to governance. Ben stated in an interview with My FM "Ontario really needed a true conservative party once again, the Progressive Conservative Party of Ontario are not conservative in any sense of the term they're on the left side of the political spectrum, more progressives and corporatists, not so different from the liberals".

He previously ran as a candidate for the New Blue Party in the Sarnia-Lambton riding during the 2022 Ontario General Election. Major topics discussed by Benn have included opposition to the dump being built in Dresden, ensuring clean well water, and promoting fiscal conservatism. Benn supports private clinics funded through the public healthcare system.

At his events, he has campaigned against the 'diversity, equity and inclusion' (DEI) focus of schools, opposes Critical Race Theory, and believes in meritocracy.

He was involved in investigating the safety of well water after turbine installations in Chatham-Kent.

=== Green ===
Andraena Tilgner, a registered Respiratory therapist is running a campaign with a focus on healthcare issues and Climate change. Tilgner is originally from British Columbia moving to Ontario in 1998. She gained a Bachelor of Health Sciences (BHSc.) from the University of Western Ontario in 2002.

=== None of The Above Party ===
Stephen R. Campbell is the candidate for the None of The Above Party, previously running with them as a candidate for MPP in London-Fanshawe. He is a technical support analyst with the Thames Valley District School Board. Campbell opposes the Dresden, Ontario dump plan, Carbon pricing in Canada and Transmission line which Campbell says "take up valuable farm land".

=== Ontario Party ===
Cynthia Workman, a resident of Thamesville and 2022 Ontario Party candidate in London West is running in this by-election. She was running as an independent until the Ontario Party was re-registered on April 10, 2024. The following year, she became the candidate for the People's Party of Canada in the federal riding of Middlesex-London.

=== Family Rights Party ===
Hilda Walton is the candidate running for the Family Rights Party.

== Polling ==
Polling firm	Last date of polling	Source	PC	NDP	Liberal	Green	Other	Margin of error	Sample size	Polling tye	Lead
Liaison Strategies	April 25, 2024		52%	14%	21%	8%	5%	±5.11%	367	IVR	31%
Mainstreet Research	April 16, 2024		58%	13%	18%	4%	7%	—N/a	270	Telephone	40%
Liaison Strategies	March 28, 2024		39%	14%	26%	12%	9%	±4.88%	403	IVR	13%

== Results ==
Ontario provincial by-election, May 2, 2024: Lambton—Kent—Middlesex Resignation of Monte McNaughton
Party	Candidate	Votes	%	±%
Progressive Conservative	Steve Pinsonneault	15,656	56.80	–2.01
Liberal	Cathy Burghardt-Jesson	6,289	22.82	+13.23
New Democratic	Kathryn Shailer	2,978	10.80	–8.03
New Blue	Keith Benn	1,515	5.50	–0.87
Green	Andraena Tilgner	429	1.56	–2.42
None of the Above	Stephen R. Campbell	360	1.31	+0.60
Ontario Party	Cynthia Workman	250	0.91	–0.81
Family Rights	Hilda Walton	87	0.32	–
Total valid votes		27,564	99.48	
Total rejected, unmarked and declined ballots		145	0.52	–0.07
Turnout		27,709	30.18	–17.10
Eligible voters		91,819		
Progressive Conservative hold		Swing		–7.62
Source: Elections Ontario

== See also ==
- 2024 Milton provincial by-election
- List of Ontario by-elections
