= Steve Pinsonneault =

Canadian politician

Steve Pinsonneault MPP
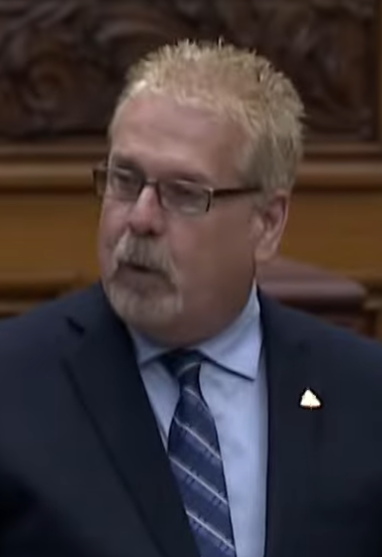
- Pinsonneault in 2024

Member of the Ontario Provincial Parliament for Lambton—Kent—Middlesex
- Incumbent
- Assumed office May 2, 2024
- Preceded by: Monte McNaughton

Personal details
- Party: Progressive Conservative

Steve Pinsonneault MPP is a Canadian politician who was elected to the Legislative Assembly of Ontario in a by-election on May 2, 2024. He represents the electoral district of Lambton—Kent—Middlesex as a member of the Ontario Progressive Conservative Party.

Prior to his election to the legislature, he was a municipal councillor in Chatham-Kent.

Pinsonneault was reelected in the 2025 general election. In May 2025, he stated his opposition to his own party's omnibus bill to cancel an environmental assessment of a proposed 30-fold expansion of a landfill in Dresden, Ontario in his riding. During his byelection win in 2024, he had campaigned on securing such an assessment.

== Electoral record ==
2025 Ontario general election: Lambton—Kent—Middlesex
Party	Candidate	Votes	%	±%	Expenditures
Progressive Conservative	Steve Pinsonneault	25,297	53.55	–3.25	$50,888
Liberal	Cathy Burghardt-Jesson	12,397	26.24	+3.43	$43,451
New Democratic	Kathryn Shailer	5,775	12.23	+1.42	$26,691
New Blue	Andy Fisher	2,093	4.43	–1.07	$0
Green	Andraena Tilgner	1,677	3.55	+1.99	$2,653
Total valid votes/expense limit		47,239	99.38	–	$149,975
Total rejected, unmarked and declined ballots		294	0.62	+0.10	
Turnout		47,533	51.03	+20.85	
Eligible voters		93,152			
Progressive Conservative hold		Swing		–3.34	
Source: Elections Ontario

Ontario provincial by-election, May 2, 2024: Lambton—Kent—Middlesex Resignation of Monte McNaughton
Party	Candidate	Votes	%	±%
Progressive Conservative	Steve Pinsonneault	15,656	56.80	–2.01
Liberal	Cathy Burghardt-Jesson	6,289	22.82	+13.23
New Democratic	Kathryn Shailer	2,978	10.80	–8.03
New Blue	Keith Benn	1,515	5.50	–0.87
Green	Andraena Tilgner	429	1.56	–2.42
None of the Above	Stephen R. Campbell	360	1.31	+0.60
Ontario Party	Cynthia Workman	250	0.91	–0.81
Family Rights	Hilda Walton	87	0.32	–
Total valid votes		27,564	99.48	
Total rejected, unmarked and declined ballots		145	0.52	–0.07
Turnout		27,709	30.18	–17.10
Eligible voters		91,819		
Progressive Conservative hold		Swing		–7.62
Source: Elections Ontario
