= Marcel Beaubien =

Canadian politician (born c.1942)

Ontario MPP
- In office 1999–2003
- Preceded by: New riding
- Succeeded by: Maria Van Bommel
- Constituency: Lambton—Kent—Middlesex
- In office 1995–1999
- Preceded by: Ellen MacKinnon
- Succeeded by: Riding abolished
- Constituency: Lambton

Personal details
- Born: 1942 (age 83–84)
- Party: Progressive Conservative
- Occupation: Insurance broker

Marcel Beaubien (born c. 1942) is a former politician in Ontario, Canada. He was a Progressive Conservative member of the Legislative Assembly of Ontario from 1995 to 2003 and unsuccessfully sought election to the House of Commons of Canada as the Conservative candidate in the federal riding of Sarnia-Lambton in 2004.

== Background ==
Beaubien was an insurance broker in private life, and served as President of the Sarnia United Way.

== Politics ==
He began his political career at the municipal level, serving as a councillor in Petrolia, of which he later became mayor. He also served as a regional councillor for Lambton County.

He was elected to the Ontario legislature for the provincial riding of Lambton in the provincial election of 1995, defeating Liberal candidate Larry O'Neill by over 4,000 votes. The Progressive Conservatives won the election, and Beaubien served as a government backbencher for the next four years. In 1995, Beaubien put pressure on the newly elected provincial government to intervene in the native protest at Ipperwash which culminated in the Ipperwash Crisis. From July 1995 to April 1997, Premier Mike Harris assigned him as the Parliamentary Assistant to the Minister of Agriculture, Food and Rural Affairs. In 1998, he was responsible for a spearheading a government decision to deny Ontario Health Insurance Plan (OHIP) coverage to patients seeking sex-change operations.

In the provincial election of 1999, Beaubien defeated O'Neill again by fewer than 1,000 votes in the redistributed riding of Lambton—Kent—Middlesex. As before, he was not appointed to cabinet and served as a government backbencher. On April 25, 2002, newly minted Premier Ernie Eves appointed him to the position of parliamentary assistant to the Minister of Finance, Janet Ecker.

The Progressive Conservatives were defeated in the provincial election of 2003, and Beaubien lost his seat to Liberal Maria Van Bommel by over 3,500 votes. The following year, he challenged long-serving Liberal MP Roger Gallaway in the federal riding of Sarnia—Lambton, and lost by over 5,000 votes.
