= Terri Crawford =

- Born: Montreal, Quebec, Canada
- Origin: Winnipeg, Manitoba
- Genres: Rock; children's
- Occupation: Singer
- Instrument: Vocals
- Years active: 1971–present

Terri Crawford, formerly billed as Terry Crawford, is a Canadian musician, most noted as a two-time Juno Award nominee for Most Promising Female Vocalist at the Juno Awards of 1982 and the Juno Awards of 1983.

== Background ==
Originally from Montreal, Quebec, she moved with her family at age 12 to Winnipeg, Manitoba, where she met her husband and musical collaborator Rick Johnson in high school. They formed the Terry Crawford Band, with Crawford on vocals and Johnson on guitar, in 1971 before marrying in 1975.

Crawford and Johnson moved to the Greater Toronto Area in 1979, settling at first in Oshawa. The couple remained the core of the Terry Crawford Band, although the supporting lineup changed at this time.

== Musical career ==
The Terry Crawford Band released their self-titled debut album on RCA Records in 1980.

The album Good Girl Gone Bad followed in 1982; although Crawford was now billed as a solo artist, her supporting musicians still included the same band lineup from the 1980 album. She followed up with the album Virgin Heart in 1983; this album included "One Time for Old Times", a song written by Gary O' which was Crawford's biggest hit in Canada and would later become a hit in the United States for the band .38 Special. In this era, Crawford earned the tag "Canada's Sexiest Female Rocker" in a music magazine's reader poll, although she herself disputed the characterization on the grounds that "I don't think I've done anything to earn it."

Crawford then moved to Attic Records for the 1986 album Total Loss of Control, which featured the singles "I'll Be Back" and "First Step". Crawford and Johnson retired the band in 1988 to concentrate on raising their family, although Crawford continued to do jingle and voice-over work in television and radio, the couple performed some shows with the cover band The Retro Rockets, and they recorded and toured behind several albums of children's music as Terri & Rick; this activity in turn led Johnson into politics, beginning on the local school board and culminating in his election to the Legislative Assembly of Ontario in 2009.

In 1989 songwriters Fred Mollin and Stan Meissner hired her to sing on the song "Broken Dream" which was used in the Vancouver based horror film Friday the 13th Part VIII: Jason Takes Manhattan. The song was not released for 32 years, having only appeared in the film as one of the tracks actress Saffron Henderson's character "J.J." jams along to on her electric guitar, the other being an instrumental. Despite never being released the song remained popular among Friday the 13th fans. Meissner responded to a fan query where he claimed that no complete versions of the songs were made as they were never intended for release outside the film. However, in 2021, the song was included on La-La-Land Records’ release of the film’s soundtrack which revealed a previously unheard chorus and lead guitar parts.

In 2011, she released Life Lines.

== Discography ==
- Terry Crawford Band (1980)
- Good Girl Gone Bad (1982)
- Virgin Heart (1983)
- Total Loss of Control (1986)
- Life Lines (2011)
- Friday the 13th Part VIII: Jason Takes Manhattan – Music From the Motion Picture (2021)
