= Haliburton—Kawartha Lakes—Brock (provincial electoral district) =

Provincial electoral district in Ontario, Canada

Coordinates: 44.414°N 78.344°W

Ontario electoral district
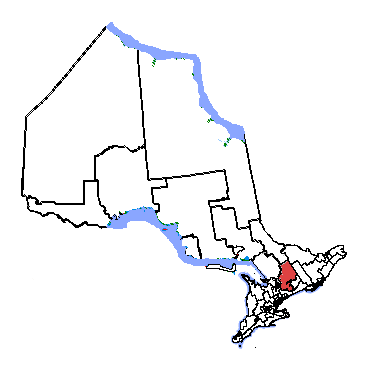
- Haliburton—Kawartha Lakes—Brock in relation to other electoral districts

Provincial electoral district
- Legislature: Legislative Assembly of Ontario
MPP
Laurie Scott
Progressive Conservative
- District created: 1999
- First contested: 1999
- Last contested: 2025

Demographics
- Population (2016): 113,960
- Electors (2018): 96,832
- Area (km²): 8,667
- Pop. density (per km²): 13.1
- Census division(s): Kawartha Lakes, Haliburton County, Peterborough County, Durham Region
- Census subdivision(s): Algonquin Highlands, Brock, Cavan-Monaghan, Kawartha Lakes, Trent Lakes

Haliburton—Kawartha Lakes—Brock (formerly Haliburton—Victoria—Brock) is a provincial electoral district in Central Ontario, Canada. It elects one member to the Legislative Assembly of Ontario. It was created in 1999 from parts of Victoria—Haliburton, Durham East, Durham—York and Hastings—Peterborough.

When the riding was created it was called Haliburton—Victoria—Brock, and included all of Victoria County, most of Haliburton County, the townships of Brock, Galway-Cavendish and Harvey, Burleigh and Anstruther, Chandos and Cavan, as well as the village of Millbrook.

In 2007 it was renamed Haliburton—Kawartha Lakes—Brock after Victoria County was renamed Kawartha Lakes. The riding also gained the municipality of Algonquin Highlands, plus the entire municipality of Cavan-Monaghan. It was identical to the federal riding of the same name until the boundaries changed before the 2025 Canadian federal election.

== 2009 by-election ==
The 2009 by-election in Haliburton—Kawartha Lakes—Brock unfolded as one of the more contentious and politically charged events in Ontario's recent electoral history. On February 4, 2009, a writ was issued for a by-election to be held on March 5, 2009. The contest was triggered by the resignation of sitting Progressive Conservative MPP Laurie Scott, who stepped down to make way for PC leader John Tory's return to the Ontario legislature—a controversial political maneuver that quickly became the focal point of the campaign.

Tory, a former leader without a seat, was attempting yet again to win elected office after losing his own seat in the 2007 provincial election. However, his attempt to return through Haliburton—Kawartha Lakes—Brock was fraught with challenges. Many local voters expressed strong opposition to Scott's resignation, with a February 9 local poll from the Lindsay Post showing that nearly 70 percent of respondents disapproved of her stepping down solely to enable Tory's candidacy. Almost half of those polled stated they were less inclined to vote PC as a result.

Tory's outsider status — he was based in Toronto and perceived as disconnected from rural concerns — only deepened local skepticism. His moderate stance on certain issues, including public funding for religious schools, further alienated parts of the traditionally conservative base, leading to decreased enthusiasm among PC voters and lower turnout for his campaign.

Challenging Tory was Rick Johnson, the Ontario Liberal Party candidate and former president of the Ontario Public School Boards' Association. Johnson had previously contested the riding in 2007 and resigned his presidency to oppose Tory's education policy, particularly his push for extending public funding to religious schools. In 2009, he returned with solid backing—the local Liberal riding association endorsed him unanimously.

The riding also saw interest from smaller parties. Brad Harness, leader of the marginal Reform Party of Ontario, criticized Tory as an "urbanite" unfit for rural representation, and declared plans to contest the by-election. However, despite the strong rhetoric, the party ultimately failed to register a candidate in time.

The Green Party of Ontario nominated Mike Schreiner, a well-regarded local food advocate, sustainable community champion, and entrepreneur, who would later become leader of the provincial Green Party.

In a surprising political upset, Rick Johnson defeated Tory, ending the latter's tenure as party leader shortly thereafter. The by-election is often remembered as a potent example of local voter backlash against perceived political opportunism and underestimation of rural political sentiment in Ontario.

== Members of Provincial Parliament ==
Assembly	Years	Member	Party
Haliburton—Victoria—Brock
37th	1999–2003	Chris Hodgson	Progressive Conservative
38th	2003–2007	Laurie Scott	Progressive Conservative
Haliburton—Kawartha Lakes—Brock
39th	2007–2009	Laurie Scott	Progressive Conservative
39th	2009–2011	Rick Johnson	Liberal
40th	2011–2014	Laurie Scott	Progressive Conservative
41st	2014–2018	Laurie Scott	Progressive Conservative
42nd	2018–2022	Laurie Scott	Progressive Conservative
43rd	2022–present	Laurie Scott	Progressive Conservative

== Election results ==
Winning party in each polling division of Haliburton—Kawartha Lakes—Brock at the 2025 Ontario general election

2025 Ontario general election
Party	Candidate	Votes	%	±%
Progressive Conservative	Laurie Scott	26,446	52.03	–0.28
Liberal	Alison Bennie	11,676	22.97	+9.50
New Democratic	Barbara Doyle	6,980	13.73	–1.99
Green	Tom Regina	2,593	5.10	–2.45
New Blue	Jacquie Barker	1,221	2.40	+0.59
Ontario Party	Brian Kerr	969	1.91	–6.17
Libertarian	Zachary Tisdale	384	0.76	–0.30
Independent	Gene Balfour	287	0.56	–0.49
Freedom	Bill Denby	275	0.54	–
Total valid votes		50,831	99.27	
Total rejected, unmarked and declined ballots		372	0.73	–0.02
Turnout		51,203	48.18	+0.05
Eligible voters		106,268		
Progressive Conservative hold		Swing		–4.89
Source: Elections Ontario

Winning party in each polling division of Haliburton—Kawartha Lakes—Brock at the 2022 Ontario general election

2022 Ontario general election
Party	Candidate	Votes	%	±%
Progressive Conservative	Laurie Scott	25,594	52.31	–4.40
New Democratic	Barbara Doyle	7,692	15.72	–10.78
Liberal	Don McBey	6,590	13.47	+3.57
Ontario Party	Kerstin Kelly	3,949	8.07	–
Green	Tom Regina	3,695	7.55	+3.09
New Blue	Ben Prentice	888	1.81	–
Libertarian	Gene Balfour	518	1.06	+0.26
Total valid votes		48,926	99.26	
Total rejected, unmarked and declined ballots		366	0.74	–0.34
Turnout		49,292	48.14	–11.52
Eligible voters		102,400		
Progressive Conservative hold		Swing		+3.19
Source: Elections Ontario

2018 Ontario general election
Party	Candidate	Votes	%	±%
Progressive Conservative	Laurie Scott	32,406	56.71	+16.41
New Democratic	Zac Miller	15,142	26.50	+6.36
Liberal	Brooklynne Cramp-Waldinsperger	5,655	9.90	–25.37
Green	Lynn Therien	2,551	4.46	+0.18
None of the Above	Thomas Rhyno	622	1.09	–
Libertarian	Gene Balfour	455	0.80	–
Consensus Ontario	Chuck Macmillan	312	0.55	–
Total valid votes		57,143	98.92	
Total rejected, unmarked and declined ballots		626	1.08	–
Turnout		57,769	59.66	–
Eligible voters		96,832		
Progressive Conservative hold		Swing		+11.39
Source: Elections Ontario

2014 general election redistributed results
Party	Vote	%
Progressive Conservative	19,278	40.30
Liberal	16,872	35.27
New Democratic	9,635	20.14
Green	2,048	4.28

2014 Ontario general election
Party	Candidate	Votes	%	±%
Progressive Conservative	Laurie Scott	21,641	40.96	–4.48
Liberal	Rick Johnson	18,512	35.03	+1.45
New Democratic	Donald Abel	10,431	19.74	+2.43
Green	Arsalan Ahmad	2,255	4.27	+1.09
Total valid votes		52,839	98.29	
Total rejected, unmarked and declined ballots		919	1.71	+1.33
Turnout		53,758	55.98	+1.00
Eligible voters		96,029		
Progressive Conservative hold		Swing		–2.96
Source: Elections Ontario

2011 Ontario general election
Party	Candidate	Votes	%	±%
Progressive Conservative	Laurie Scott	22,352	45.43	+4.23
Liberal	Rick Johnson	16,522	33.58	–10.29
New Democratic	Donald Abel	8,517	17.31	+11.35
Green	Anita Payne	1,562	3.17	–3.40
Freedom	Charles Olito	245	0.50	+0.10
Total valid votes		49,198	99.62	
Total rejected, unmarked and declined ballots		188	0.38	+0.05
Turnout		49,386	54.98	+15.64
Eligible voters		89,830		
Progressive Conservative gain from Liberal		Swing		+7.26
Source: Elections Ontario

Ontario provincial by-election, March 5, 2009 Resignation of Laurie Scott
Party	Candidate	Votes	%	±%
Liberal	Rick Johnson	15,542	43.88	+14.37
Progressive Conservative	John Tory	14,595	41.20	–8.79
Green	Mike Schreiner	2,330	6.58	–0.58
New Democratic	Lyn Edwards	2,112	5.96	–5.95
Independent	Jason Taylor	280	0.79	–
Family Coalition	Jake Pothaar	258	0.73	+0.11
Freedom	Bill Denby	140	0.40	–0.41
Independent	John Turmel	94	0.27	–
Libertarian	Paolo Fabrizio	72	0.20	–
Total valid votes		35,423	99.67	
Total rejected, unmarked and declined ballots		118	0.33	–0.03
Turnout		35,541	39.34	–19.89
Eligible voters		90,351		
Liberal gain from Progressive Conservative		Swing		+11.58
Source: Elections Ontario

2007 Ontario general election
Party	Candidate	Votes	%	±%
Progressive Conservative	Laurie Scott	24,273	49.99	+2.58
Liberal	Rick Johnson	14,327	29.51	–4.00
New Democratic	Joan Corrigan	5,785	11.92	–3.47
Green	Douglas Smith	3,475	7.16	+5.29
Freedom	Bill Denby	391	0.81	+0.27
Family Coalition	Jake Pothaar	301	0.62	–0.67
Total valid votes		48,552	99.63	
Total rejected, unmarked and declined ballots		178	0.37	–0.16
Turnout		48,730	59.22	–3.95
Eligible voters		82,283		
Progressive Conservative hold		Swing		+3.29
Source: Elections Ontario

2003 Ontario general election: Haliburton—Victoria—Brock
Party	Candidate	Votes	%	±%
Progressive Conservative	Laurie Scott	24,297	47.41	–15.40
Liberal	Jason D. Ward	17,171	33.51	+5.05
New Democratic	Earl Manners	7,884	15.39	+7.98
Green	Douglas Smith	956	1.87	–
Family Coalition	Paul Gordon	663	1.29	–
Freedom	Charles Olito	273	0.53	+0.15
Total valid votes		51,244	99.48	
Total rejected, unmarked and declined ballots		268	0.52	–1.03
Turnout		51,512	63.18	–0.62
Eligible voters		81,538		
Progressive Conservative hold		Swing		–10.22
Source: Elections Ontario

1999 Ontario general election: Haliburton—Victoria—Brock
Party	Candidate	Votes	%
Progressive Conservative	Chris Hodgson	32,125	62.82
Liberal	Sharon McCrae	14,556	28.46
New Democratic	Rick Denyer	3,786	7.40
Independent	Brad Bradamore	340	0.66
Freedom	Charles Olito	198	0.39
Natural Law	Maxim Newby	135	0.26
Total valid votes		51,140	98.45
Total rejected, unmarked and declined ballots		806	1.55
Turnout		51,946	63.80
Eligible voters		81,425	
Progressive Conservative pickup new district.			
Source: Elections Ontario

== 2007 electoral reform referendum ==
2007 Ontario electoral reform referendum
Side	Votes	%
First Past the Post	33,156	70.1
Mixed member proportional	14,166	29.9
Total valid votes	47,322	100.0

== See also ==
- List of Ontario provincial electoral districts
- Canadian provincial electoral districts

== Sources ==
- Elections Ontario Past Election Results
- Map of riding for 2018 election
