= Lambton—Kent—Middlesex (provincial electoral district) =

Provincial electoral district in Ontario, Canada

Coordinates: 42.8°N 81.8°W

Ontario electoral district
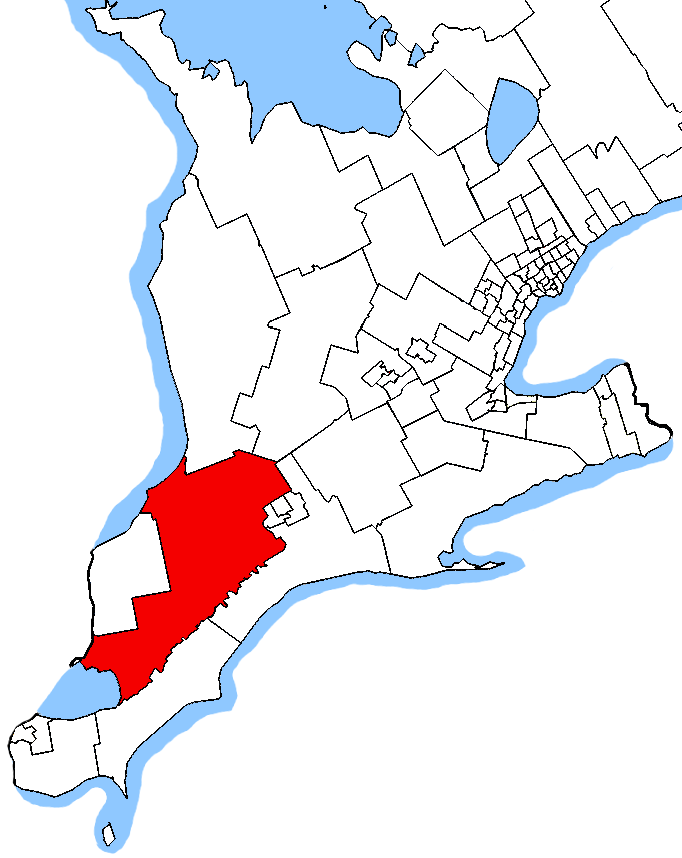

Provincial electoral district
- Legislature: Legislative Assembly of Ontario
MPP
Steve Pinsonneault
Progressive Conservative
- District created: 1999
- First contested: 1999
- Last contested: 2025

Demographics
- Population (2016): 105,335
- Electors (2018): 83,993
- Area (km²): 5,708
- Pop. density (per km²): 18.5
- Census division(s): Chatham-Kent, Lambton County, Middlesex County
- Census subdivision(s): Lambton Shores, Warwick, Brooke-Alvinston, Dawn-Euphemia, Southwest Middlesex, Newbury, Adelaide Metcalfe, Strathroy-Caradoc, Oneida 41, Chippewas of the Thames First Nation 42, Walpole Island 46, Chatham-Kent, North Middlesex, Lucan Biddulph, Middlesex Centre

Lambton—Kent—Middlesex is a provincial electoral district in southwestern Ontario, Canada. It elects one member to the Legislative Assembly of Ontario. It was created in 1999 from parts of Lambton, Chatham—Kent and Middlesex when ridings were redistributed to match their federal counterparts.

From 1999 to 2007 the riding consisted of the municipalities of Lambton Shores, Warwick, Brooke-Alvinston, Dawn-Euphemia, Southwest Middlesex, Newbury, Adelaide Metcalfe, Strathroy-Caradoc, Oneida 41, Chippewas of the Thames First Nation 42, Plympton-Wyoming, Enniskillen, Petrolia, Oil Springs, Walpole Island 46, Chatham-Kent north of the Thames River and not including the former city of Chatham, and the southwest third of North Middlesex.

In 2007, the riding was redistributed, and it lost Plympton-Wyoming, Enniskillen, Petrolia and Oil Springs while it gained the rest of North Middlesex, Lucan Biddulph and Middlesex Centre.

A rural riding by nature, the issues of gun control and abortion arise frequently during town-hall meetings and elections.

During the 1999 election, the riding attracted controversy as it included Ipperwash Provincial Park - the sight of a 1995 stand-off between the Ontario Provincial Police and native land protesters known as the Ipperwash Crisis. Political events in the riding became frequent targets for further protests by natives unhappy with the Conservative Government's handling of the Ipperwash Affair and the associated shooting death of protester Dudley George. Despite the controversy, Progressive Conservative MPP Marcel Beaubien was re-elected to the Legislative Assembly of Ontario, despite strong campaigns by Liberal former municipal politician Larry O'Neil and New Democratic candidate Jim Lee, then-President of United Automobile Workers Local 251.

== Members of Provincial Parliament ==
This riding has elected the following members of the Legislative Assembly of Ontario:

Lambton—Kent—Middlesex
Assembly	Years	Member	Party
Riding created from Lambton, Chatham—Kent and Middlesex
37th	1999–2003	Marcel Beaubien	Progressive Conservative
38th	2003–2007	Maria Van Bommel	Liberal
39th	2007–2011	Maria Van Bommel	Liberal
40th	2011–2014	Monte McNaughton	Progressive Conservative
41st	2014–2018	Monte McNaughton	Progressive Conservative
42nd	2018–2022	Monte McNaughton	Progressive Conservative
43rd	2022–2023	Monte McNaughton	Progressive Conservative
43rd	2024–2025	Steve Pinsonneault	Progressive Conservative
44th	2025–present	Steve Pinsonneault	Progressive Conservative

== Election results ==
Winning party in each polling division of Lambton—Kent—Middlesex at the 2025 Ontario general election

2025 Ontario general election
Party	Candidate	Votes	%	±%	Expenditures
Progressive Conservative	Steve Pinsonneault	25,297	53.55	–3.25	$50,888
Liberal	Cathy Burghardt-Jesson	12,397	26.24	+3.43	$43,451
New Democratic	Kathryn Shailer	5,775	12.23	+1.42	$26,691
New Blue	Andy Fisher	2,093	4.43	–1.07	$0
Green	Andraena Tilgner	1,677	3.55	+1.99	$2,653
Total valid votes/expense limit		47,239	99.38	–	$149,975
Total rejected, unmarked and declined ballots		294	0.62	+0.10	
Turnout		47,533	51.03	+20.85	
Eligible voters		93,152			
Progressive Conservative hold		Swing		–3.34	
Source: Elections Ontario

Ontario provincial by-election, May 2, 2024 Resignation of Monte McNaughton
Party	Candidate	Votes	%	±%
Progressive Conservative	Steve Pinsonneault	15,656	56.80	–2.01
Liberal	Cathy Burghardt-Jesson	6,289	22.82	+13.23
New Democratic	Kathryn Shailer	2,978	10.80	–8.03
New Blue	Keith Benn	1,515	5.50	–0.87
Green	Andraena Tilgner	429	1.56	–2.42
None of the Above	Stephen R. Campbell	360	1.31	+0.60
Ontario Party	Cynthia Workman	250	0.91	–0.81
Family Rights	Hilda Walton	87	0.32	–
Total valid votes		27,564	99.48	
Total rejected, unmarked and declined ballots		145	0.52	–0.07
Turnout		27,709	30.18	–17.10
Eligible voters		91,819		
Progressive Conservative hold		Swing		–7.62
Source: Elections Ontario

Winning party in each polling division of Lambton—Kent—Middlesex at the 2022 Ontario general election

2022 Ontario general election
Party	Candidate	Votes	%	±%	Expenditures
Progressive Conservative	Monte McNaughton	24,933	58.81	+3.46	$86,631
New Democratic	Vanessa Benoit	7,987	18.84	–14.48	$66,308
Liberal	Bruce Baker	4,063	9.58	+3.35	$0
New Blue	David Barnwell	2,701	6.37	–	$3,090
Green	Wanda Dickey	1,688	3.98	+0.69	$381
Ontario Party	Aaron Istvan Vegh	727	1.71	–	$0
None of the Above	Dean Eve	300	0.71	–	$283
Total valid votes/expense limit		42,399	99.41	–	$126,309
Total rejected, unmarked and declined ballots		253	0.59	–0.63	
Turnout		42,652	47.28	–13.50	
Eligible voters		90,221			
Progressive Conservative hold		Swing		+8.97	
Source: Elections Ontario

2018 Ontario general election
Party	Candidate	Votes	%	±%
Progressive Conservative	Monte McNaughton	27,906	55.34	+10.12
New Democratic	Todd Case	16,800	33.32	+6.87
Liberal	Mike Radan	3,143	6.23	–13.95
Green	Anthony Li	1,660	3.29	–1.30
Trillium	Brian Everaert	555	1.10	–
Libertarian	Brad Greulich	360	0.71	–
Total valid votes		50,424	98.78	
Total rejected, unmarked and declined ballots		622	1.22	–0.19
Turnout		51,046	60.77	+3.84
Eligible voters		83,993		
Progressive Conservative notional hold		Swing		+1.57
Source: Elections Ontario

^ Results are compared to redistributed results

2014 general election redistributed results
Party	Vote	%
Progressive Conservative	20,514	45.32
New Democratic	11,969	26.44
Liberal	9,136	20.19
Green	2,072	4.58
Others	1,570	3.47

2014 Ontario general election
Party	Candidate	Votes	%	±%
Progressive Conservative	Monte McNaughton	20,710	45.17	–0.56
New Democratic	Joe Hill	12,160	26.52	+5.56
Liberal	Mike Radan	9,298	20.28	–9.04
Green	James Armstrong	2,104	4.59	+2.26
Family Coalition	Marinus Vander Vloet	568	1.24	+0.41
None of the Above	Bob Lewis	558	1.22	–
Freedom	Dave Durnin	242	0.53	+0.25
Libertarian	Matt Willson	207	0.45	–
Total valid votes		45,847	98.60	
Total rejected, unmarked and declined ballots		653	1.40	+0.99
Turnout		46,500	56.93	+2.85
Eligible voters		81,678		
Progressive Conservative hold		Swing		–3.06
Source: Elections Ontario

2011 Ontario general election
Party	Candidate	Votes	%	±%
Progressive Conservative	Monte McNaughton	19,379	45.74	+9.43
Liberal	Maria Van Bommel	12,423	29.32	–13.95
New Democratic	Joe Hill	8,882	20.96	+10.23
Green	James Armstrong	987	2.33	–5.57
Family Coalition	Marinus Vander Vloet	350	0.83	–0.48
Reform	Brad Harness	232	0.55	+0.05
Freedom	Tom Jackson	119	0.28	–
Total valid votes		42,372	99.58	
Total rejected, unmarked and declined ballots		177	0.42	–0.16
Turnout		42,549	54.08	–1.10
Eligible voters		78,683		
Progressive Conservative gain from Liberal		Swing		+11.69
Source: Elections Ontario

2007 Ontario general election
Party	Candidate	Votes	%	±%
Liberal	Maria Van Bommel	18,228	43.27	–1.39
Progressive Conservative	Monte McNaughton	15,295	36.30	+0.63
New Democratic	Joyce Jolliffe	4,520	10.73	–1.21
Green	James Armstrong	3,329	7.90	–
Family Coalition	Bill McMaster	549	1.30	–
Reform	Brad Harness	209	0.50	–
Total valid votes		42,130	99.43	
Total rejected, unmarked and declined ballots		243	0.57	–0.24
Turnout		42,373	55.18	–4.57
Eligible voters		76,790		
Liberal notional hold		Swing		–1.01
Source: Elections Ontario

2003 general election redistributed results
Party	Vote	%
Liberal	17,804	44.65
Progressive Conservative	14,223	35.67
New Democratic	4,761	11.94
Others	3,085	7.74

2003 Ontario general election
Party	Candidate	Votes	%	±%
Liberal	Maria Van Bommel	18,533	45.11	+2.18
Progressive Conservative	Marcel Beaubien	15,060	36.66	–8.34
New Democratic	Joyce Jolliffe	4,523	11.01	+1.42
Green	Tim van Bodegom	1,133	2.76	–
Independent	James Armstrong	1,053	2.56	–
Freedom	Wayne Forbes	780	1.90	–0.58
Total valid votes		41,082	99.19	
Total rejected, unmarked and declined ballots		336	0.81	–0.19
Turnout		41,418	59.75	–0.71
Eligible voters		69,314		
Liberal gain from Progressive Conservative		Swing		+5.26
Source: Elections Ontario

1999 Ontario general election
Party	Candidate	Votes	%
Progressive Conservative	Marcel Beaubien	19,561	45.00
Liberal	Larry O'Neill	18,665	42.94
New Democratic	Jim Lee	4,170	9.59
Freedom	Wayne H. Forbes	1,076	2.48
Total valid votes		43,472	99.00
Total rejected, unmarked and declined ballots		440	1.00
Turnout		43,912	60.46
Eligible voters		72,630	
Progressive Conservative pickup new district.			
Source: Elections Ontario

== 2007 electoral reform referendum ==
2007 Ontario electoral reform referendum
Side	Votes	%
First Past the Post	28,144	68.8
Mixed member proportional	12,775	31.2
Total valid votes	40,919	100.0

== See also ==
- List of Ontario provincial electoral districts
- Canadian provincial electoral districts
