= Reform Party of Ontario =

Minor political party

- Former provincial party
- Leader: Bradley J. Harness
- President: Joshua E. Eriksen
- Founder: Bill Cook
- Founded: 1989
- Dissolved: 2014
- Headquarters: 415 Scott St. E. Strathroy, Ontario; N7G 3Y8
- Ideology: Populism; Right-wing populism Conservatism; Fiscal conservatism Social conservatism Libertarian conservatism Libertarianism; Grassroots Democracy; Localism
- Political position: Right-wing
- National affiliation: Reform Party of Canada
- Colours: Purple, Blue, Green

Website
- Official website

The Reform Party of Ontario (RPO) (PRO; French: Parti Réformiste de l'Ontario) was a minor political party in Ontario, Canada. Until the 1999 provincial election, the party ran one candidate each election in order to keep the party's name in the possession of supporters of the Reform Party of Canada.

Although a small group of candidates laid claim to the name, they had to run under the 'Independent Reform' label. After the federal Reform Party became defunct, several independent Reformers revived the RPO name, and the party ran two candidates in the 2007 provincial election and four in the 2011 provincial election.

The Reform Party of Ontario is not to be confused with the pre-Confederation Reform Party, which later became the Ontario Liberal Party, with the leftist progressive United Reform party of the 1940s, nor the defunct populist social conservative New Reform Party of Ontario (known as the Family Coalition Party of Ontario until it was renamed in 2015).

== Official Reform Party of Ontario ==
Supporters of the federal Reform Party registered the "Reform Party of Ontario" name in 1989, and re-registered it in 1994. This registration was made to prevent anyone else from using the 'Reform' name in Ontario politics; the party nominated one paper candidate in each election and did not campaign actively. Ken Kalopsis, the co-president of the Canadian Alliance, ran for the RPO in the 1999 provincial election in Davenport, as its first candidate to maintain registration and control the rights to the party name. Kalopsis won 174 votes without campaigning.

Federal Reform leader Preston Manning and Premier of Ontario Mike Harris had a good relationship, and it was agreed that the federal Reform Party would not campaign actively provincially in order to prevent vote splitting. The provincial Tories returned the favour by giving some unofficial support to Reform in federal politics.

Robert Beard was the party's leader for RPO in 2002. With the end of the federal Reform Party, the provincial Reform Party was deregistered in September 2003.

== Unofficial movement ==
In 1993, several strong supporters of the Reform Party of Canada started a movement that advocated for an active Reform party in Ontario. This movement was not affiliated with the federal Reform Party, and thus was prevented from using the Reform Party of Ontario name by Elections Ontario.

After the 1995 general election, the Ontario-based group founded "Grassroots United Against Reform's Demise" (GUARD) to lobby for the Reform Party's participation in provincial politics. "Focus Federally For Reform", which opposed an active party, was formed in response opposing participation. A vast majority of Ontario Reform supporters backed Focus Federally, and Grassroots United lost their bid to have the party enter Ontario politics.

The group supporting a Reform movement in Ontario formed the "Reform Association of Ontario" (Reform Ontario), cofounded by Kimble F. Ainslie of London and Reg Gosse of Kitchener in 1994. The association was denied party status by the Ontario Election Commission in 1995, and ran unsuccessfully in the 1995 election. Candidates were nominated in Huron—Bruce, Kitchener—Waterloo, London, Ontario district, and other ridings in the Greater Toronto Area for Reform Association of Ontario. The group's aim was to protest the undemocratic decision. The candidates gained very few votes and no candidate was elected.

The Reform Association of Ontario ran a candidate in the 1999 election in Prince Edward—Hastings and in the 2003 election in Bruce—Grey—Owen Sound. Both were credited as "Independent Reform" candidates, but gained very few votes and no candidate was elected. Running again as an Independent Reformer, the 2003 Reform Ontario candidate for Bruce—Grey—Owen Sound, Bill Cook, ran in the 2005 Dufferin—Peel—Wellington—Grey by-election, against the Ontario Progressive Conservative leader, John Tory, who won.

The Reform Association for Ontario was renamed the "Reform Ontario" movement and continued to promote its "Triple 'R' Government" agenda, including recall for removing unpopular politicians and fixed election dates, referendums on the issues such as electoral financing reform and preferential ballot voting, and "real responsible representation" through more free votes for MPPs instead of direction from party whips in the Legislative Assembly of Ontario.

== Official party ==
The "Representative Party of Ontario" was formed by and led by Bill Cook, a former Reform Ontario activist from Bruce—Grey—Owen Sound. The party never got beyond being a reserved provincial political party name in the province of Ontario, Canada. The party's request to register the name and abbreviation was submitted in early September 2004, verified in late October-early November, and reserved on Friday, December 17, 2004. The name was judged to be not acceptable by Elections Ontario on March 10, 2005. The party hoped to become the grassroot Reform-oriented alternative to the main Liberal, Progressive Conservative and New Democratic parties in the province. The party's traditional populist beliefs in representative and direct democracy followed those of the politics of pre-Confederation Reform Party leader William Lyon Mackenzie, former United Farmers of Ontario premier Ernest Charles Drury and former Ontario Cooperative Commonwealth Federation member Agnes Campbell Macphail.

When the name was rejected in 2005, the party was then intended to be revived as "Ontario Alternative", according to Elections Ontario, a name reserved by Joshua E. Eriksen, a student of political science at Redeemer College and McMaster University in Hamilton. As federal Reform Party supporters no longer had possession of the name "Reform Party of Ontario", the name was reclaimed by the provincial Reformers for the 2007 election. Bradley J. Harness, who cofounded the federal Ontario Party of Canada with George Burns in 2002, was selected as its party leader, Cook as its deputy leader and agriculture critic, and Eriksen as its provincial party president.

The RPO ran two candidates: Cook in Bruce—Grey—Owen Sound and Harness in Lambton—Kent—Middlesex. Eriksen was its campaign manager, but neither candidate gained many votes nor were elected.

Past party president Donn Korbin and chief financial officer Andrew Long pushed to keep the Reform Party of Ontario a true blueprint of the Common Sense Revolution era of the Ontario Progressive Conservatives. During that era, Mike Harris and the Ontario PCs had won two majority governments. Special interest groups like the Ontario Landowners Association (OLA) and its "Rural Revolution" members had maintained a hard right line with the RPO against the Ontario Tories, now led by Red Tory moderate John Tory.

Joining forces, the populist-based RPO and libertarian-based OLA agreed on many common principles to build a unified Northern Rural Ontario manifesto for the farmer and labourer. Three basic principles were identified: "property rights, deamalgamation, and less government yet better governance". RPO party leader Harness and president Eriksen met with OLA president and current Carleton—Mississippi Mills PC MPP Jack MacLaren and eight other senior leaders from the group to work out the details. Lanark—Frontenac—Lennox & Addington PC MPP Randy Hillier considered crossing over to Reform in the Ontario Legislature as its first member because of his dissatisfaction with Tory's leadership.

According to the press, Harness had worked out a side deal under which he would become the deputy under Hillier, if Hillier joined Reform Ontario. Hillier declined and then quickly denied any involvement with the side deal, and the strength of both organizations was greatly diminished.

=== 2009 and 2010 by-election campaigns ===
On February 4, Ontario Premier Dalton McGuinty announced that a by-election would be held on March 5, 2009, in Haliburton—Kawartha Lakes—Brock to fill the seat vacated by its PC MPP Laurie Scott, who stepped aside so that Progressive Conservative leader John Tory could seek a seat in the legislature.

Reform Party leader Brad Harness announced that Reform planned to run a candidate, and slammed Tory as an "urbanite" who would only appeal to "big C" Conservatives. However, Harness backed down, and the party did not field a candidate.

Harness announced that he would run a Reform candidate in the March 4, 2010 by-election in Ottawa West—Nepean, but then Harness backed down again and did not do so.

=== 2011–2015 ===
The party ran four candidates in the 2011 election: Robert Szajkowski in Hamilton Centre, Gerald Augustine in Niagara West–Glanbrook, David Natale in Vaughan, and the party leader Harness in Lambton—Kent—Middlesex. Former Hamilton Mountain PC MPP Trevor Pettit acted as a campaign manager and deputy leader of the party. None of the party's candidate were elected.

The party did not run candidates in the 2014 election, and was deregistered by Elections Ontario.

=== Subsequent activity ===
Some executives of the Reform Party of Ontario and some grassroots members, were approached to join the new expansion towards a broader base in time for the 2018 provincial election. Those actively involved include RPO president Joshua E. Eriksen, RPO deputy leader Bill Cook, as well as other RPO executives from the past.

At an annual general meeting in Burlington at the Crossroads Forum, the Family Coalition Party of Ontario leadership via its newly elected party leader James Gault, deputy leader and director of communications Eric Ames, president Lynne Scime led a move to combine the original traditional moral values of the FCP with the democratic reform principles of the RPO into a new rebranded party called the New Reform Party of Ontario.

However, the new party was deregistered by Elections Ontario as of January 2016, after only running once in the 2015 Simcoe North byelection, where Gault and New Reform placed fifth out of eight candidates with 197 votes (0.50%).

== Party ideology ==
The Reform Party of Ontario, like the Reform Association of Ontario and the Reform Ontario movement before it, was an Ontario provincial version of the federal Reform Party of Canada. Though populism makes up the main thrust of its political ideology, Reform Ontario focused on a mixture of fiscal, social, and libertarian conservatism.

RPO supported a reduction in the size of government. RPO would balance the budget and pay down the deficit and debt first before cutting taxes. Reform Ontario respect for life, freedom and liberty of the individual, and private ownership of property with limited yet effective government are key principles. They believed the family unit is the basic building block of society, in a stronger institution of marriage reduces cultural ills and increases labour productivity. RPO believed in more public involvement by the people using private investment for more effective and efficient service in areas of health care, education, and energy, which allow government limited control over personal decisions by its taxpayers.

Reform Ontario supported what it called "Triple 'R' government": (1) referendums on the issues such as electoral financing reform and preferential ballot voting, (2) a recall for removing unpopular politicians and fixed election dates, and (3) "real responsible representation" through more free publicly recorded and unwhipped votes for MPPs instead of direction by party whips in the Legislative Assembly of Ontario. The party also supported allowing municipalities that have been amalgamated the right to deamalgamate, and of strengthening of individual property rights.

== Election results ==
Election	Candidates nominated	Candidates elected	Total votes	% of popular vote
2007	2	-	354	0.01%
2011	4	-	647	0.01%

== See also ==
- List of Ontario general elections
- List of Ontario political parties
- Reform Party of Alberta
- Reform Party of Canada
