= Maria Van Bommel =

Canadian politician

Ontario MPP
- In office 2003–2011
- Preceded by: Marcel Beaubien
- Succeeded by: Monte McNaughton
- Constituency: Lambton—Kent—Middlesex

Personal details
- Political party: Liberal

Maria Van Bommel is a former Canadian politician in Ontario, Canada. From 2003 to 2011, she was a member of the Legislative Assembly of Ontario, representing the London area riding of Lambton—Kent—Middlesex for the Ontario Liberal Party.

== Politics ==
In the 2003 provincial election, she defeated incumbent Progressive Conservative Marcel Beaubien by about 3,500 votes in Lambton—Kent—Middlesex, a predominantly rural riding in the southwest region of the province.

She was defeated by Monte McNaughton in the 2011 provincial election by nearly 7,000 votes.
