= Rick Johnson (Canadian politician) =

Canadian politician and musician

Ontario MPP
- In office 2009–2011
- Preceded by: Laurie Scott
- Succeeded by: Laurie Scott
- Constituency: Haliburton—Kawartha Lakes—Brock

Personal details
- Party: Liberal
- Spouse: Terri Crawford
- Children: 2
- Occupation: Musician

Rick Johnson is a former Canadian politician and musician. He was a Liberal member of the Legislative Assembly of Ontario from 2009 to 2011 who represented the riding of Haliburton—Kawartha Lakes—Brock. He was elected in a by-election on March 5, 2009, defeating Progressive Conservative leader John Tory. He lost to Laurie Scott in the 2011 election who had previously held the riding.

== Background ==
Before entering politics, Johnson was a musician, working alongside his wife Terri Crawford both in the Terry Crawford Band of the 1970s and 1980s and later as a children's music duo billed as Terri & Rick.

== Politics ==
Johnson previously served as a public school trustee for, and chair of, the Trillium Lakelands District School Board and as president of the Ontario Public School Boards Association. In his term on the OPSBA, Johnson introduced breakfast, co-operative education and literacy programs for his district. He has also served on the Lindsay Chamber of Commerce.

Johnson was the Liberal candidate in Haliburton—Kawartha Lakes—Brock in the 2007 provincial election, losing to Laurie Scott. On January 9, 2009, Scott announced she was resigning her seat in order to provide Conservative Leader John Tory a seat in the legislature. Johnson capitalized on public anger from Scott's move and narrowly defeated Tory in the subsequent by-election.

Johnson served as the Parliamentary Assistant to the Minister of Infrastructure, Bob Chiarelli. He previously served as the Parliamentary Assistant to the Minister of Agriculture, Food and Rural Affairs. In the 2011 election, Johnson lost again to P.C. candidate Laurie Scott by 6,000 votes in the 2011 provincial election. He ran again in 2014 but lost again to Scott, this time by more than 3,000 votes.

== Electoral record ==
2011 Ontario general election
Party	Candidate	Votes	%	±%
Progressive Conservative	Laurie Scott	22,357	45.4	+4.3
Liberal	Rick Johnson	16,522	33.6	-10.13
New Democratic	Don Abel	8,517	17.3	+11.32
Green	Anita Payne	1,652	3.2	-3.44
Freedom	Charles Olito	254	0.5	+0.1
Total valid votes		48,942	100.00	

Haliburton—Kawartha Lakes—Brock by-election, March 5, 2009 resignation of Laurie Scott
Party	Candidate	Votes	%	±%
Liberal	Rick Johnson	15,482	43.73	+14.22
Progressive Conservative	John Tory	14,576	41.17	-8.73
Green	Mike Schreiner	2,352	6.64	-0.56
New Democratic	Lyn Edwards	2,117	5.98	-5.92
Independent	Jason Taylor	320	0.90	
Family Coalition	Jake Pothaar	258	0.73	-0.07
Freedom	Bill Denby	140	0.40	-0.4
Independent	John Turmel	92	0.26	
Libertarian	Paolo Fabrizio	71	0.20	

2007 Ontario general election
Party	Candidate	Votes	%	±%
Progressive Conservative	Laurie Scott	24,272	49.9	
Liberal	Rick Johnson	14,324	29.5	
New Democratic	Joan Corrigan	5,773	11.9	
Green	Douglas Smith	3,475	7.2	–
Freedom	Bill Denby	391	0.8	
Family Coalition	Jake Pothaar	364	0.8	
