= Newbury, Ontario =

Newbury
- Village (lower-tier)
- Village of Newbury
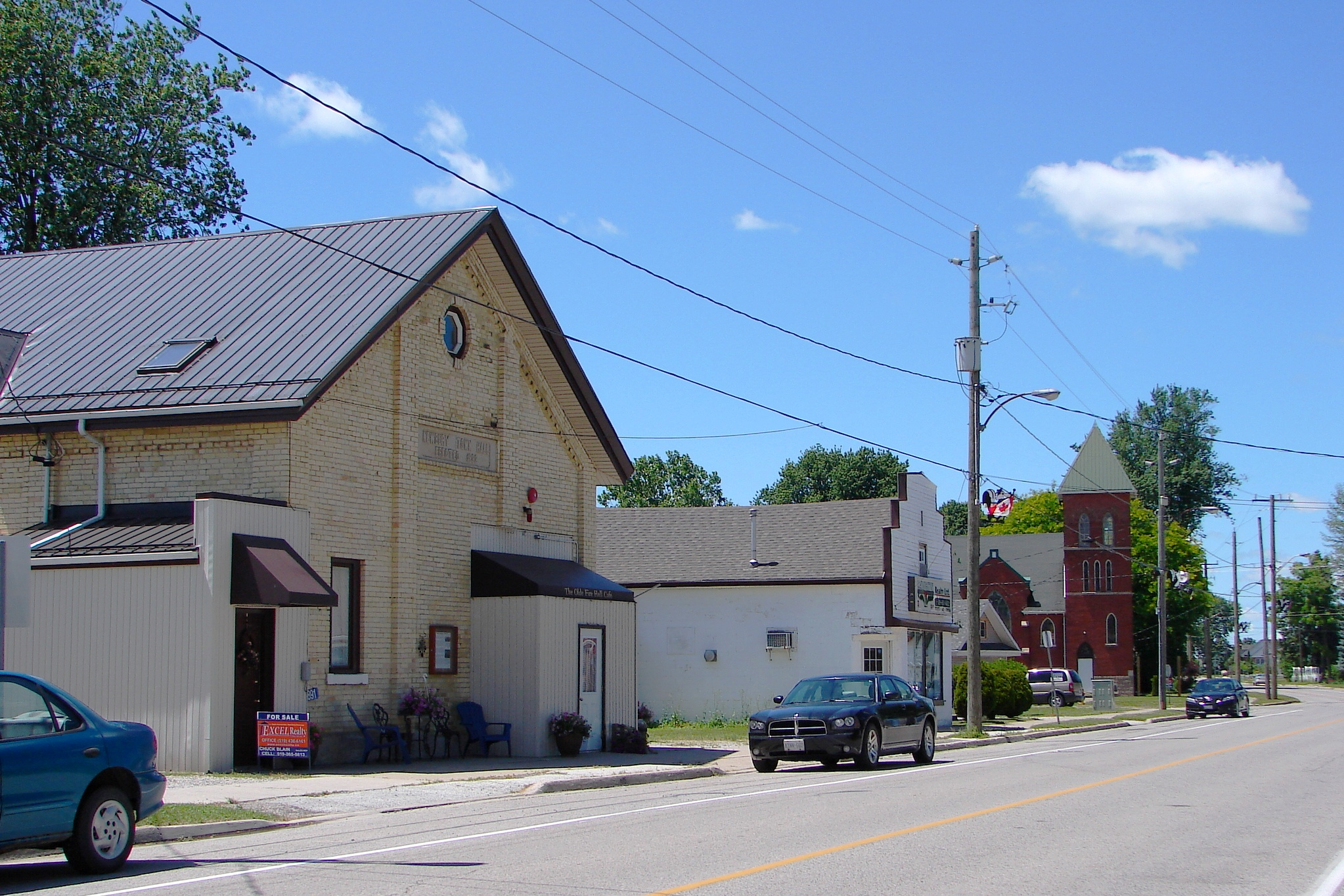

- Location within Middlesex County Location within Southern Ontario
- Coordinates: 42°41′00″N 81°47′50″W
- Country: Canada
- Province: Ontario
- County: Middlesex
- Settled: 1851
- Incorporated: 1873

Government
  - Reeve: Diane Brewer
  - Federal riding: Middlesex—London
  - Prov. riding: Lambton—Kent—Middlesex

Area
  - Land: 1.77 km^{2} (0.68 sq mi)

Population (2021)
  - Total: 440
  - Density: 248.6/km^{2} (644/sq mi)
- Time zone: UTC-5 (EST)
  - Summer (DST): UTC-4 (EDT)
- Postal Code: N0L
- Area codes: 519 and 226
- Website: www.newbury.ca

Newbury is an incorporated village in the Canadian province of Ontario, located in Middlesex County. As of the 2016 census, its population is 466. It is located in the southwestern corner of the county, entirely surrounded by the municipality of Southwest Middlesex. The Four Counties Health Services Hospital is based in Newbury and is part of the Middlesex Hospital Alliance. The hospital serves approximately 23,000 residents, primarily from the Village of Newbury, Lambton, Kent, Middlesex and Elgin Counties.

== History ==
The village got its start in 1851 when the Great Western Railway was built through the area. The first house built was located south of the railroad in 1851 by Robert Thompson. The settlement was originally known as Ward's Station, but was renamed in 1854 after the namesake town in England since most of the residents were of English and Irish origin. That same year, the post office opened with Robert Thompson as first postmaster.

By 1872, Newbury's population had reached 750 people. The following year it was incorporated as a village. During those early years, Newbury had a flourmill, seven hotels, three churches, a school, library, fire hall, and a basket factory. In January 1873, Newbury's first council was elected.

In 1967, the Four Counties General Hospital opened, followed by the Newbury Medical Clinic in 1972.

== Demographics ==
In the 2021 Census of Population conducted by Statistics Canada, Newbury had a population of 440 living in 187 of its 195 total private dwellings, a change of −5.6% from its 2016 population of 466. With a land area of 1.77 km^{2} (0.68 sq mi), it had a population density of 248.6/km^{2} (643.8/sq mi) in 2021.

Canada census – Newbury community profile

	2021	2016	2011
Population	440 (-5.6% from 2016)	466 (+4.3% from 2011)	447 (+1.8% from 2006)
Land area	1.77 km^{2} (0.68 sq mi)	1.77 km^{2} (0.68 sq mi)	1.85 km^{2} (0.71 sq mi)
Population density	248.6/km^{2} (644/sq mi)	263.3/km^{2} (682/sq mi)	241.0/km^{2} (624/sq mi)
Median age	47.2 (M: 46.4, F: 47.2)	43.5 (M: 40.8, F: 44.9)	43.7 (M: 43.5, F: 44.0)
Private dwellings	190 (total)	184 (total)	193 (total)
Median household income		$56,192

References: 2021 2016 2011

Historical population
Year	Pop.	±%
1991	419	—
1996	430	+2.6%
2001	422	−1.9%
2006	439	+4.0%
2011	447	+1.8%
2016	466	+4.3%
2021	440	−5.6%
