= Anderson College of Health, Business and Technology =

Career college in Canada

Coordinates: 43°34′38.3″N 79°37′14.0″W

- Type: Private
- Established: July 17, 1885
- Location: Mississauga, Hamilton and Toronto, Ontario, Canada
- Website: www.andersoncollege.com

Anderson College of Health, Business and Technology is an Ontario diploma-granting career college with 10 campuses in the province. Anderson College was founded in 1885 and is recognized for its courses on healthcare, business, technology and law enforcement.

Anderson College is registered as a Private Career College under the Private Career College Act, 2005.

== Programs of study ==
Though the courses available differ between campuses, Anderson College offers diplomas in the following:

- Accounting & Payroll
- Business Administration
- Business Management
- Cardiology Technologist
- Early Childcare Assistant
- English as a Second Language (ESL)
- Intra Oral Level I and II Dental Assistant
- Medical Office Administrator
- Pharmacy Assistant
- Personal Support Worker
- Medical Laboratory Technician
- Physiotherapy & Occupational Therapy Assistant
- Law Enforcement / Police Foundations
- Supply Chain and Logistics

== Accreditation ==
Anderson College is a member of Ontario Association of Career Colleges (OACC) and the National Association of Career Colleges (NACC).

The school has a number of certifications and recognitions, including:

- Ontario Dental Nurses and Assistants Association (ODAA)
- National Dental Assistants Examination Board (NDAEB)
- Ontario Society of Medical Technologists (OSMT)
- Laboratory Assistants Committee (CLA)
- Ontario Medical Secretaries Association-Health Care Associates (OMSA-HCA)
- Ontario College of Pharmacists (OCP)
- Canadian Council of Professional Certification (CCPC)

== Campus locations ==
Anderson College has ten campus locations in Ontario:

- Brampton
- Brantford
- Downtown Toronto campus, at 180 Bloor Street West
- Hamilton campus, at 31 King Street East
- Kitchener
- London
- Midtown Toronto campus, at 20 Eglinton Avenue East
- Mississauga campus, at 165 Dundas Street West
- North York campus, at 5734 Yonge Street
- Windsor

== History ==
=== Westervelt College ===
Westervelt College was a Southwestern Ontario private career college located in Brantford, Kitchener, London, and Windsor. The college offered the most career training programs across Ontario. Founded in 1885 (Canada's oldest career college), it offered diploma programs in the fields of Business, Healthcare, Law, Service, and Information Technology. The college provided career services for students and a job posting service for potential employers.

James Washington Westervelt Sr. founded Westervelt College in 1885 in downtown London, at the corner of Richmond Street and King Street West. In 1896, Westervelt assisted in founding the Business Educator's Association of Canada. Over the years, the vocational College expanded, moved and changed ownership several times before Donna and Allan Doerr purchased the College in 1991. In 1995, the college built a new, 4-storey, 40,000 square foot campus in London, Ontario, at the corner of Bradley Ave. and Wellington Rd. which served the college until September 2017, and became a Fanshawe College campus in 2019. In 1999, the Ontario Restaurant Hotel and Motel Association awarded Westervelt "Supplier of the Year" for supplying the best graduates for employment in the Hospitality Industry. In 2009, Westervelt College received the London Chamber of Commerce Outstanding Business Achievement Award.

By 2010, the college had over 48,000 graduates, and was acknowledged by the Prime Minister of Canada, Stephen Harper, and the Premier of Ontario, Dalton McGuinty, for the 125th anniversary of its founding.

In 2017, Westervelt College was acquired and merged with three of Medix College's locations in Brantford, London and Kitchener.

Anderson College later merged with Westervelt College in 2022, consolidating all campuses under the Anderson name.

== See also ==
- List of colleges in Ontario
- Higher education in Ontario
- Private Education in Canada
- Education in Ontario
