= Laurie Scott (politician) =

Canadian politician

Laurie Scott MPP
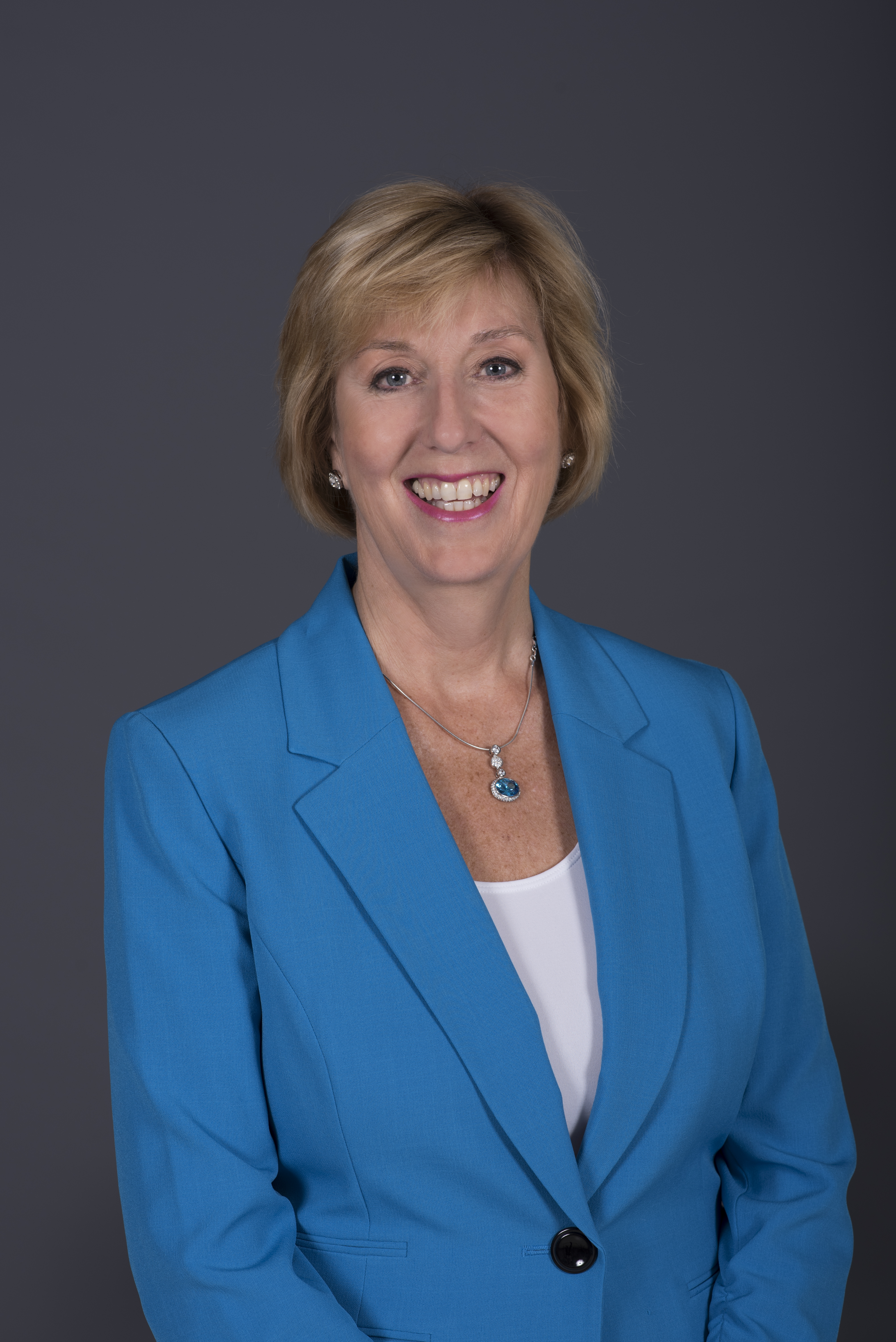
- Scott in 2017

Minister of Infrastructure
- In office June 20, 2019 – June 18, 2021
- Premier: Doug Ford
- Preceded by: Monte McNaughton
- Succeeded by: Kinga Surma

Minister of Labour
- In office June 29, 2018 – June 20, 2019
- Premier: Doug Ford
- Preceded by: Kevin Flynn
- Succeeded by: Monte McNaughton

Member of the Ontario Provincial Parliament for Haliburton—Kawartha Lakes—Brock
- Incumbent
- Assumed office October 6, 2011
- Preceded by: Rick Johnson
- In office October 2, 2003 – January 8, 2009
- Preceded by: Chris Hodgson
- Succeeded by: Rick Johnson

Personal details
- Born: 1962 (age 63–64) Kinmount, Ontario, Canada
- Party: Progressive Conservative
- Parent: Bill Scott (father)

Laurie J. Scott MPP (born 1962) is a Canadian politician who served as minister of Infrastructure from 2019 to 2021 and minister of Labour from 2018 to 2019 in the Doug Ford cabinet. She is a Progressive Conservative member of the Legislative Assembly of Ontario representing the riding of Haliburton—Kawartha Lakes—Brock since 2003, except for a break from 2009 to 2011.

== Background ==
Scott was born and raised in the village of Kinmount, Ontario, now part of the city of Kawartha Lakes. Her father, the late Bill Scott, was a federal Progressive Conservative MP from 1965 to 1993. She attended Loyalist College in Belleville where she obtained a degree in nursing. She worked as a Registered Nurse at the Ross Memorial Hospital and the Toronto General Hospital.

== Politics ==
In the Canadian general election of 2000, she ran in Haliburton—Victoria—Brock for the federal Progressive Conservative party, but finished behind Liberal John O'Reilly and Canadian Alliance candidate Pat Dunn in a close, three-way race. From 2000 to 2003, she worked as an assistant to Progressive Conservative Senator Consiglio Di Nino.

Scott was elected to the Ontario Legislature in the 2003 provincial election, defeating Liberal candidate Jason Ward in the riding of Haliburton—Kawartha Lakes—Brock by over 7,000 votes. Scott was appointed opposition critic for training, colleges and universities.

In the 2007 provincial election, Scott ran against Rick Johnson of the Ontario Liberal Party, and Joan Corrigan of the Ontario NDP. She defeated the Liberal candidate by almost 10,000 votes with 49.9% of the total vote. She then served as the official opposition critic for research and innovation and health promotion.

On January 8, 2009, it was announced that Scott would resign as MPP to allow PC leader John Tory to seek a seat in the legislature. However, Tory was defeated by Johnson in the by-election that followed. Scott subsequently served as chair of the Ontario PC party's election preparedness committee until the 2011 election.

In the 2011 election, in a rematch with Johnson, Scott regained her seat defeating Johnson by about 6,000 votes. She was re-elected in the 2014 election defeating Johnson again by about 3,000 votes. She then served as the Official Opposition Critic for Community Safety and Women's Issues until 2018.

In the 2018 Ontario provincial election, Laurie Scott was re-elected for a fifth-term as the MPP for Haliburton-Kawartha Lakes-Brock. She received 56.7% of the vote and won with a margin of victory of more than 17 000 votes over the second-place NDP candidate Zac Miller. When the PCs returned to government following the 2018 general election, Scott was appointed to cabinet as Minister of Labour by Premier Doug Ford. After a cabinet shuffle in 2020, she was demoted to Minister of Infrastructure, a portfolio she held until June 18, 2021. Since June 18, 2021, Scott holds no portfolio in the Ford cabinet and is currently a backbencher.

In the 2022 provincial general election, Scott won re-election in Haliburton-Kawartha-Lakes-Brock. She received 25,656 votes. NDP candidate Barbara Doyle received 7,677 votes and Liberal Don McBey 6,608.

She is a passionate advocate for victims of human sex trafficking and was recognized with the BOOST Champion for Children Award in 2017 for her work.

=== Cabinet positions ===
OntarFord ministry, Province of Ontario (2018–present)
Cabinet posts (2)
Predecessor	Office	Successor
Monte McNaughton	Minister of Infrastructure; June 20, 2019– June 18, 2021	Kinga Surma
Kevin Flynn	Minister of Labour; June 29, 2018 – June 20, 2019	Monte McNaughton

=== Electoral history ===
2025 Ontario general election: Haliburton—Kawartha Lakes—Brock
Party	Candidate	Votes	%	±%
Progressive Conservative	Laurie Scott	26,446	52.17	–0.14
Liberal	Alison Bennie	11,676	23.03	+9.56
New Democratic	Barbara Doyle	6,980	13.77	–1.95
Green	Tom Regina	2,593	5.12	–2.43
New Blue	Jacquie Barker	1,221	2.41	+0.60
Ontario Party	Brian Kerr	969	1.91	–6.16
Independent	Gene Balfour	424	0.84	N/A
Libertarian	Zachary Tisdale	384	0.76	–0.30
Freedom	Bill Denby	275	0.54	N/A
Total valid votes/expense limit		50,693	99.27	+0.01
Total rejected, unmarked, and declined ballots		372	0.73	–0.01
Turnout		51,065	48.95	+0.81
Eligible voters		104,325		
Progressive Conservative hold		Swing		–4.85
Source: Elections Ontario

2022 Ontario general election: Haliburton—Kawartha Lakes—Brock
Party	Candidate	Votes	%	±%
Progressive Conservative	Laurie Scott	25,594	52.31	−4.40
New Democratic	Barbara Doyle	7,692	15.72	−10.78
Liberal	Don McBey	6,590	13.47	+3.57
Ontario Party	Kerstin Kelly	3,949	8.07	
Green	Tom Regina	3,695	7.55	+3.09
New Blue	Ben Prentice	888	1.81	
Libertarian	Gene Balfour	518	1.06	+0.26
Total valid votes		48,926	100.0	
Total rejected, unmarked, and declined ballots		366		
Turnout		49,292	48.14	
Eligible voters		101,416		
Progressive Conservative hold		Swing		+3.19
Source(s): "Summary of Valid Votes Cast for Each Candidate" (PDF). Elections Ontario. 2022. Archived from the original on May 18, 2023.; "Statistical Summary by Electoral District" (PDF). Elections Ontario. 2022. Archived from the original on May 21, 2023.
