= 1935 Hamilton, Ontario, municipal election =

- Monday, December 2, 1935
Candidate	William Morrison	Septimus DuMoulin	William Wardrope
Party	Independent Conservative	Independent Conservative	Independent
Popular vote	12,910	9,069	7,883
Percentage	34.7%	24.4%	21.2%
Candidate	Edmund Goodfellow	John Hunter
Party	Independent	Communist
Popular vote	5,106	2,186
Percentage	13.7%	6%
Mayor before election
Herbert Wilton
Independent Conservative
Elected mayor
William Morrison
Independent Conservative

The 1935 Hamilton municipal election was held on December 2, 1935 to select one mayor, four controllers, and sixteen members of the Hamilton, Ontario, City Council, two from each of the city's eight wards. Voters also cast ballots for trustees for the public school board, and in three plebiscites that sought to restructure elections for both city council and the public school board.

== Campaign ==
The 1935 municipal campaign in Hamilton occurred at the height of the Great Depression, prompting municipal officials to consider cost-cutting measures in local government. In early November, 1935, Hamilton City Council began debating proposals to lengthen municipal campaigns and stagger elections so save on the cost of printing ballots and hiring polling workers. James Berry, the city clerk, advised council members that increasing the length of a city council term could save taxpayers $9,000 a year in election-related costs.

On Tuesday, November 5, council met to debate the matter. There was considerable confusion among members, who opted to submit a plebiscite question to the electorate asking if they were in favour of an increase in the term length for members of the Board of Control, city council, and school board from one year to two years. Almost immediately after passing the motion, the city's solicitor, A.J. Polson, informed Mayor Wilton that the motion was illegal, as it included wording regarding the Hamilton Board of Education. In passing this motion, it would have allowed supporters of Hamilton's Catholic School Board an opportunity to vote on the length of term of trustees for a school board other than the one they supported. At a follow-up meeting, council determined it would be appropriate to split the plebiscite into three questions, asking voters if they wanted a two-year term, if they preferred a staggered election, and asking public school supporters if they wanted to bring trustee elections in line with council's two-year plan.

Despite having been elected to Parliament, outgoing mayor Herbert Wilton inserted himself into the municipal campaign, giving a speech in late November, 1935, railing against council members who found themselves unable to deal with the financial stresses placed upon the city by the economic crisis in the country. "You complain about high taxation," Wilton said, addressing Hamilton's electorate, "and then vote to elect men who have never been able to successfully manage their own financial affairs." Wilton, a strong advocate for low taxes and classical liberal economic policy, implored voters to carefully manage municipal finances, which he referred to as a "$8,000,000 business concern." Wilton also took aim at members of the Communist Party, who were seeking election in the city's working-class north-end. Wilton spoke passionately against the atheism of their members and the economic problems in the Soviet Union at the time. "They preach and teach the doctrine of hate, place their dead in graves without Christian burial, and deny the existence of God," he argued.

The campaign was overtly partisan, with each political party's organization campaigning to elect candidates friendly to their platform. After the election, the Spectator declared that "Hamilton is still Tory Hamilton is the political affiliations of the new City Council may be taken as a criterion," Detailing the political affiliations of the members of council, the Spectator acknowledged that the mayor and 12 members of council were elected with the help of the local Conservative Party, five Liberals were returned, while Controller Nora-Frances Henderson and Ward 7 Alderman Donald Clark were members of the Reconstruction Party of Canada, with Ward 8 Alderman Agnes Sharpe serving as the only Cooperative Commonwealth Federation-affiliated member of council.

In addition to the efforts of the organized federal parties, there was a clandestine 'ghost' slate supported by local teachers who advocated for the election of William Morrison, and Board of Control candidates Don McFarlane, Thomas Lewington, and Andy Frame. This was in response to the affiliated candidates promising to press the Hamilton Board of Education to reverse pay cuts imposed on teachers thanks to the city's worsening economic situation.

== Mayor ==
The mayoral race in 1935 was marked by incumbent mayor Herbert Wilton's election earlier that year to Parliament for the constituency of Hamilton West. Soon after his election, incumbent Controller Septimus DuMoulin and former Hamilton East MLA William Morrison, who had been unseated by Sam Lawrence a year earlier, both expressed an interest in contesting the mayoralty.

The city's Cooperative Commonwealth Federation establishment, organized and energized by Sam Lawrence's election to the Ontario legislature, had originally entertained plans to run a candidate for mayor, though they opted to forego that strategy, instead aiming to put up at least one candidate for election to the Board of Control, city council, and the public school board. The Liberal Party as well originally considered running local real estate agent F. Kent Hamilton for the office to challenge DuMoulin and Morrison, who were both heavily involved in local Conservative politics. They ultimately decided against this strategy.

On nomination day, DuMoulin and Morrison were nominated, along with Communist Party candidate John Hunter, local baker Ed Goodfellow, and lawyer William H.W. Wardrope. In their nomination speeches, each candidate outlined core planks in their platform, with DuMoulin emphasizing his experience and a desire to see water-rates lowered, Goodfellow outlining a plan to reduce the city's debt, Wardrope advocating increasing taxes on the wealthy, Hunter proposing a graduated property tax with exemptions for those making less than $3,000 a year, and Morrison calling for a continuation of Wilton's program of keeping taxes and spending low.

Summary of the December 2, 1935 Hamilton, Ontario mayoral election
Candidate	Affiliation	Popular vote		Elected?
Candidate	Affiliation	Votes	%	Elected?
William Morrison	Independent Conservative	12,910	34.7%	
Septimus DuMoulin	Independent Conservative	9,069	24.4%	
William Wardrope	Independent	7,883	21.2%	
Edmund Goodfellow	Independent	5,106	13.7%	
John Hunter	Communist	2,186	6%	
Total votes		37,154		
Registered voters				
Note: Candidate campaign colours are used as a visual differentiation between candidates and to indicate affiliation.
Sources: "Morrison is Swept into Mayor's Chair," Hamilton Spectator, December 3, 1935, pp. 5.

== Board of Control ==
Summary of the December 2, 1935 Hamilton, Ontario Board of Control election
Candidate	Affiliation	Popular vote		Elected?
Candidate	Affiliation	Votes	%	Elected?
Freeman Treleaven (incumbent)	Independent Liberal	15,406	17.7%	
Samuel Nelson	Independent Conservative	14,939	17.2%	
Nora-Frances Henderson (incumbent)	Independent Reconstructionist	14,088	16.2%	
Donald McFarlane	Independent Conservative	12,747	14.65%	
Andy Frame	Independent	11,628	13.37%	
John Mitchell	Cooperative Commonwealth Federation	8,600	9.89%	
Thomas Lewington	Independent	11,628	9.4%	
Charles McCabe	Independent	7,197	8.78%	
George Jones	Independent	2,268	2.6%	
Total votes				
Registered voters				
Note: Candidate campaign colours are used as a visual differentiation between candidates and to indicate affiliation.
Sources: "Controllers' Recapitulation," Hamilton Spectator, December 3, 1935, pp. 15. "Conservative Majority in New City Council," Hamilton Spectator, December 3, 1935, pp. 7.

== Plebiscites ==
Hamilton, Ontario, municipal election 1935 plebiscites
Question	Yes		No	
Question	Votes	%	Votes	%
Are you in favour of electing members of Hamilton City Council to a term of two years?	10,028	32.13%	21,182	67.87%
Are you in favour of the Board of Control and aldermen being elected so that one-half the number are elected for a term of two years, the mayor to be elected for a term of two years?	7,973	28.2%	20,289	71.8%
Are you in favour of all the trustees of the Hamilton Board of Education being elected for a term of two years?	11,543	40.38%	17,043	59.62%
Total votes				
Registered voters				
Sources: "Plan to Change Voting System Junked," Hamilton Spectator, December 3, 1935, pp. 15.

== Aldermen ==
=== Ward One ===
Summary of the December 2, 1935 Hamilton, Ontario Ward 1 alderman election
Candidate	Affiliation	Popular vote		Elected?
Candidate	Affiliation	Votes	%	Elected?
William McFarland (incumbent)	Independent Conservative	4,194		
Orville Walsh (incumbent)	Independent Conservative	2,951		
Charles Turner	Cooperative Commonwealth Federation	996		
Total votes				
Registered voters				
Note: Candidate campaign colours are used as a visual differentiation between candidates and to indicate affiliation.
Sources: "Recapitulation for the aldermen", Hamilton Spectator, December 3, 1935, pp. 15. "Conservative Majority in New Council," Hamilton Spectator, December 3, 1935, pp. 7.

=== Ward Two ===
Summary of the December 2, 1935 Hamilton, Ontario Ward 2 alderman election
Candidate	Affiliation	Popular vote		Elected?
Candidate	Affiliation	Votes	%	Elected?
Beamer Hopkins	Independent Conservative	2,184		
William Ainslie (incumbent)	Independent Liberal	1,271		
James Phin	Independent	1,182		
Hugh Lennox	Independent	1,018		
Lawrence Gatenby	Independent	741		
Richard Griffith	Independent	583		
William Shaw	Independent	232		
Total votes				
Registered voters				
Note: Candidate campaign colours are used as a visual differentiation between candidates and to indicate affiliation.
Sources: "Recapitulation for the aldermen", Hamilton Spectator, December 3, 1935, pp. 15. "Conservative Majority in New Council," Hamilton Spectator, December 3, 1935, pp. 7.

=== Ward Three ===
Summary of the December 2, 1935 Hamilton, Ontario Ward 3 alderman election
Candidate	Affiliation	Popular vote		Elected?
Candidate	Affiliation	Votes	%	Elected?
Robert Evans (incumbent)	Independent Conservative	2,219		
Herbert Smye	Independent Conservative	2,110		
William Fick (incumbent)	Independent Conservative	1,740		
Austin MacAuley	Independent	1,633		
Total votes				
Registered voters				
Note: Candidate campaign colours are used as a visual differentiation between candidates and to indicate affiliation.
Sources: "Recapitulation for the aldermen", Hamilton Spectator, December 3, 1935, pp. 15. "Conservative Majority in New Council," Hamilton Spectator, December 3, 1935, pp. 7.

=== Ward Four ===
Summary of the December 2, 1935 Hamilton, Ontario Ward 4 alderman election
Candidate	Affiliation	Popular vote		Elected?
Candidate	Affiliation	Votes	%	Elected?
John Marsh	Independent Liberal	1,647		
Peter McCulloch	Independent Liberal	1,536		
George Hancock (incumbent)	Independent Conservative	1,298		
John Rowley	Independent	821		
Charles Pollicott	Independent Labour Party	647		
Total votes				
Registered voters				
Note: Candidate campaign colours are used as a visual differentiation between candidates and to indicate affiliation.
Sources: "Recapitulation for the aldermen", Hamilton Spectator, December 3, 1935, pp. 15. "Conservative Majority in New Council," Hamilton Spectator, December 3, 1935, pp. 7.

=== Ward Five ===
Summary of the December 2, 1935 Hamilton, Ontario Ward 5 alderman election
Candidate	Affiliation	Popular vote		Elected?
Candidate	Affiliation	Votes	%	Elected?
Thomas White (incumbent)	Independent Conservative	2,246		
Alexander Nelligan	Independent Conservative	1,163		
Charles Aitchison	Independent	1,114		
John Sherring	Independent	693		
William Ronald	Independent	479		
John Rae	Cooperative Commonwealth Federation	430		
Michael Hutchison	Communist Party	330		
Herbert Savage	Independent	124		
Total votes				
Registered voters				
Note: Candidate campaign colours are used as a visual differentiation between candidates and to indicate affiliation.
Sources: "Recapitulation for the aldermen", Hamilton Spectator, December 3, 1935, pp. 15. "Conservative Majority in New Council," Hamilton Spectator, December 3, 1935, pp. 7.

=== Ward Six ===
Summary of the December 2, 1935 Hamilton, Ontario Ward 6 alderman election
Candidate	Affiliation	Popular vote		Elected?
Candidate	Affiliation	Votes	%	Elected?
William Weir (incumbent)	Independent Conservative	2,774		
John Hodgson (incumbent)	Independent Conservative	2,369		
Archie Pollock	Independent	2,058		
Frank Thomson	Cooperative Commonwealth Federation	915		
Bruce Smith	Communist Party	383		
Total votes				
Registered voters				
Note: Candidate campaign colours are used as a visual differentiation between candidates and to indicate affiliation.
Sources: "Recapitulation for the aldermen", Hamilton Spectator, December 3, 1935, pp. 15. "Conservative Majority in New Council," Hamilton Spectator, December 3, 1935, pp. 7.

=== Ward Seven ===
Summary of the December 2, 1935 Hamilton, Ontario Ward 7 alderman election
Candidate	Affiliation	Popular vote		Elected?
Candidate	Affiliation	Votes	%	Elected?
Donald Clark	Independent Reconstructionist	1,776		
Archie Burton (incumbent)	Independent Conservative	1,305		
Sam Clarke	Independent	1,256		
James Morris	Independent	1,170		
John Watson	Independent	628		
John Doyle	Cooperative Commonwealth Federation	462		
James Newell	Cooperative Commonwealth Federation	358		
Total votes				
Registered voters				
Note: Candidate campaign colours are used as a visual differentiation between candidates and to indicate affiliation.
Sources: "Recapitulation for the aldermen", Hamilton Spectator, December 3, 1935, pp. 15. "Conservative Majority in New Council," Hamilton Spectator, December 3, 1935, pp. 7.

=== Ward Eight ===
Summary of the December 2, 1935 Hamilton, Ontario Ward 8 alderman election
Candidate	Affiliation	Popular vote		Elected?
Candidate	Affiliation	Votes	%	Elected?
Agnes Sharpe (incumbent)	Cooperative Commonwealth Federation	2,191		
Robert Elliott	Independent Conservative	1,871		
George Snyder	Independent	1,630		
Roy Aindow	Cooperative Commonwealth Federation	1,166		
Thomas Ellis	Independent	708		
Total votes				
Registered voters				
Note: Candidate campaign colours are used as a visual differentiation between candidates and to indicate affiliation.
Sources: "Recapitulation for the aldermen", Hamilton Spectator, December 3, 1935, pp. 15. "Conservative Majority in New Council," Hamilton Spectator, December 3, 1935, pp. 7.

== Board of education ==
=== Ward One ===
Summary of the December 2, 1935 Hamilton Board of Education Ward 1 trustee election
Candidate	Affiliation	Popular vote		Elected?
Candidate	Affiliation	Votes	%	Elected?
Russell William Treleaven (incumbent)	Independent	Acclaimed		
Total votes				
Registered voters				
Note: Candidate campaign colours are used as a visual differentiation between candidates and to indicate affiliation.
Sources: "Five School Trustees Are Not Opposed", Hamilton Spectator, November 22, 1935, pp. 7,17.

=== Ward Two ===
Summary of the December 2, 1935 Hamilton Board of Education Ward 2 trustee election
Candidate	Affiliation	Popular vote		Elected?
Candidate	Affiliation	Votes	%	Elected?
George Tweedle Inch (incumbent)	Independent	Acclaimed		
Total votes				
Registered voters				
Note: Candidate campaign colours are used as a visual differentiation between candidates and to indicate affiliation.
Sources: "Five School Trustees Are Not Opposed", Hamilton Spectator, November 22, 1935, pp. 7,17.

=== Ward Three ===
Summary of the December 2, 1935 Hamilton Board of Education Ward 3 trustee election
Candidate	Affiliation	Popular vote		Elected?
Candidate	Affiliation	Votes	%	Elected?
S.B. Russell (incumbent)	Independent	Acclaimed		
Total votes				
Registered voters				
Note: Candidate campaign colours are used as a visual differentiation between candidates and to indicate affiliation.
Sources: "Five School Trustees Are Not Opposed", Hamilton Spectator, November 22, 1935, pp. 7,17.

=== Ward Four ===
Summary of the December 5, 1927 Hamilton Board of Education Ward 4 trustee election
Candidate	Affiliation	Popular vote		Elected?
Candidate	Affiliation	Votes	%	Elected?
George R. Allan (incumbent)	Independent Conservative	Acclaimed		
Total votes				
Registered voters				
Note: Candidate campaign colours are used as a visual differentiation between candidates and to indicate affiliation.
Sources: "Five School Trustees Are Not Opposed", Hamilton Spectator, November 22, 1935, pp. 7,17.

=== Ward Five ===
Summary of the December 2, 1935 Hamilton Board of Education Ward 5 trustee election
Candidate	Affiliation	Popular vote		Elected?
Candidate	Affiliation	Votes	%	Elected?
Humphrey Mitchell	Independent Liberal-Labour	Acclaimed		
Total votes				
Registered voters				
Note: Candidate campaign colours are used as a visual differentiation between candidates and to indicate affiliation.
Sources: "Five School Trustees Are Not Opposed", Hamilton Spectator, November 22, 1935, pp. 7,17.

=== Ward Six ===
Summary of the December 2, 1935 Hamilton Board of Education Ward 6 trustee election
Candidate	Affiliation	Popular vote		Elected?
Candidate	Affiliation	Votes	%	Elected?
George Henry Wild (incumbent)	Independent Conservative	2,920		
John McGregor	Cooperative Commonwealth Federation	1,739		
Total votes				
Registered voters				
Note: Candidate campaign colours are used as a visual differentiation between candidates and to indicate affiliation.
Sources: "Five School Trustees Are Not Opposed", Hamilton Spectator, November 22, 1935, pp. 7,17. "Recapitulation for School Trustees", Hamilton Spectator, December 3, 1935, pp. 15.

=== Ward Seven ===
Summary of the December 2, 1935 Hamilton Board of Education Ward 7 trustee election
Candidate	Affiliation	Popular vote		Elected?
Candidate	Affiliation	Votes	%	Elected?
Henry Bickel (incumbent)	Independent	1,981		
Issac Armes	Cooperative Commonwealth Federation	1,531		
Total votes				
Registered voters				
Note: Candidate campaign colours are used as a visual differentiation between candidates and to indicate affiliation.
Sources: "Five School Trustees Are Not Opposed", Hamilton Spectator, November 22, 1935, pp. 7,17. "Recapitulation for School Trustees", Hamilton Spectator, December 3, 1935, pp. 15.

=== Ward Eight ===
Summary of the December 2, 1935 Hamilton Board of Education Ward 8 trustee election
Candidate	Affiliation	Popular vote		Elected?
Candidate	Affiliation	Votes	%	Elected?
Goldwin Henry (incumbent)	Independent	2,050		
Sara Doyle	Cooperative Commonwealth Federation	1,552		
Total votes				
Registered voters				
Note: Candidate campaign colours are used as a visual differentiation between candidates and to indicate affiliation.
Sources: "Five School Trustees Are Not Opposed", Hamilton Spectator, November 22, 1935, pp. 7,17. "Recapitulation for School Trustees", Hamilton Spectator, December 3, 1935, pp. 15.
