= Hamilton City Council (Ontario) =

Canadian municipal governing body

Type
- Type: Unicameral city council
- Established: 2000 (Amalgamated City of Hamilton); 1973 (Region of Hamilton-Wentworth); 1847 (City of Hamilton)

Leadership
- Mayor of Hamilton: Andrea Horwath since November 15, 2022
- Chair of Council: Rotating

Structure
- Seats: 16 (15 councillors and 1 mayor)
- Length of term: 4 years
- Salary: CA$184,662.66 (mayor); CA$97,357.26 (councillor)

Elections
- Last election: October 24, 2022 (15 seats)
- Next election: October 26, 2026 (15 seats)

Meeting place
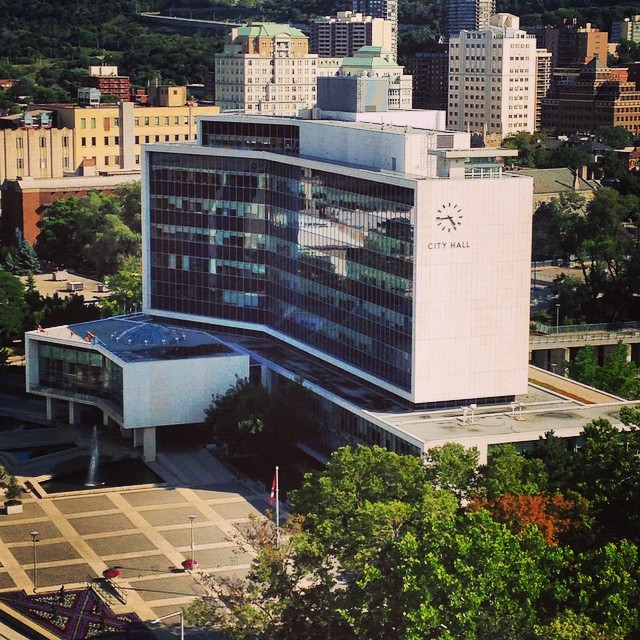
- Council Chamber; Hamilton City Hall; Hamilton, Ontario

Website
- www.hamilton.ca/city-council/council-committee/city-council-members

Hamilton City Council is the governing body of the City of Hamilton, Ontario, Canada. Since 21 November 1960, Council has met at Hamilton City Hall at 71 Main Street West.

The current council consists of the mayor plus fifteen councillors, one elected from each of the city's wards. The incumbent council was elected in a Hamilton municipal election on October 24, 2022.

== Council members ==
=== Hamilton City Councils Post Amalgamation (2000–present) ===
Hamilton City Councillors
Council	Election	Mayor	Ward 1	Ward 2	Ward 3	Ward 4	Ward 5	Ward 6	Ward 7	Ward 8	Ward 9	Ward 10	Ward 11	Ward 12	Ward 13	Ward 14	Ward 15
2026-2030	2026	Keanin Loomis	Maureen Wilson	Cameron Kroetsch	Nrinder Nann	Jason Farr	Matt Francis	Tom Jackson	Mark Daly	Dawn Danko	Johnathan Stathakos	Nicole Trombetta	Mark Tadeson	Fred Bennink	Rick Kunc	Mike Spadafora	Colleen Stewart
2022–2026	2022	Andrea Horwath	Maureen Wilson	Cameron Kroetsch	Nrinder Nann	Tammy Hwang	Matt Francis	Tom Jackson	Esther Pauls	Rob Cooper (from 2025); John-Paul Danko (2018-2025)	Brad Clark	Jeff Beattie (2022-2026)	Mark Tadeson	Craig Cassar	Alex Wilson	Mike Spadafora	Ted McMeekin
2018–2022	2018	Fred Eisenberger	Maureen Wilson	Jason Farr	Nrinder Nann	Sam Merulla	Russ Powers (from 2021); Chad Collins (2018-2021)	Tom Jackson	Esther Pauls	Rob Cooper (from 2025); John-Paul Danko (2018-2025)	Brad Clark	Maria Pearson	Brenda Johnson	Lloyd Ferguson	Arlene VanderBeek	Terry Whitehead	Judi Partridge
Ward Boundary Redistribution
2014–2018	2014	Fred Eisenberger	Aidan Johnson	Jason Farr	Matthew Green	Sam Merulla	Chad Collins	Tom Jackson	Terry Anderson (2018); Donna Skelly (2015-2018); Scott Duvall (2014-2015)	Terry Whitehead	Doug Connely	Maria Pearson	Brenda Johnson	Lloyd Ferguson	Arlene VanderBeek	Robert Patsuta	Judi Partridge
2010–2014	2010	Bob Bratina	Brian McHattie	Jason Farr	Bob Morrow (2014); Bernie Morelli (1991-2014)	Sam Merulla	Chad Collins	Tom Jackson	Scott Duvall	Terry Whitehead	Brad Clark	Maria Pearson	Brenda Johnson	Lloyd Ferguson	Russ Powers	Robert Patsuta	Judi Partridge
2006–2010	2006	Fred Eisenberger	Brian McHattie	Bob Bratina	Bernie Morelli	Sam Merulla	Chad Collins	Tom Jackson	Scott Duvall	Terry Whitehead	Brad Clark	Maria Pearson	David Mitchell	Lloyd Ferguson	Russ Powers	Robert Patsuta	Margaret McCarthy
2003–2006	2003	Larry Di Ianni	Brian McHattie	Bob Bratina (from 2004); Andrea Horwath (2003-2004)	Bernie Morelli	Sam Merulla	Chad Collins	Tom Jackson	Bill Kelly	Terry Whitehead	Phil Bruckler	Maria Pearson	David Mitchell	Murray Ferguson	Art Samson (from 2004); Russ Powers (2003- 2004)	Dave Braden	Margaret McCarthy
2000–2003	2000	Bob Wade	Marvin Caplan	Andrea Horwath	Bernie Morelli	Sam Merulla	Chad Collins	Tom Jackson	Bill Kelly	Frank D'Amico	Anne Bain	Larry Di Ianni	David Mitchell	Murray Ferguson	Russ Powers	Dave Braden	Margaret McCarthy

=== Hamilton City Councils Post Board of Control (1980–2000) ===
Hamilton City Councillors
Council	Election	Mayor	Ward 1		Ward 2		Ward 3		Ward 4		Ward 5		Ward 6		Ward 7		Ward 8	
1997–2000	1997	Bob Morrow	Mary Kiss	Marvin Caplan	Andrea Horwath	Ron Corsini	Bernie Morelli	Dennis Haining	Dave Wilson	Geraldine Copps	Chad Collins	Fred Eisenberger	Tom Jackson	Bob Charters	Terry Anderson	Bill Kelly	Frank D'Amico	Duke O'Sullivan
1994–1997	1994	Bob Morrow	Mary Kiss	Marvin Caplan	Vince Agro	Bill McCulloch	Bernie Morelli	Don Drury	Dave Wilson	Geraldine Copps	Chad Collins (from 1995); Dominic Agostino (to 1995)	Fred Eisenberger	Tom Jackson	Bob Charters	Terry Anderson	Henry Merling	Frank D'Amico	Don Ross
1991–1994	1991	Bob Morrow	Mary Kiss	Terry Cooke	Vince Agro	Bill McCulloch	Bernie Morelli	Don Drury	Dave Wilson	Geraldine Copps	Dominic Agostino	Fred Eisenberger	Tom Jackson	Bob Charters	Terry Anderson	Henry Merling	Frank D'Amico	Don Ross
1988–1991	1988	Bob Morrow	Mary Kiss	Terry Cooke	Vince Agro	Bill McCulloch	Brian Hinkley	Don Drury	David Christopherson	Geraldine Copps	Dominic Agostino	Fred Lombardo	Tom Jackson	Vince Formosi (from 1990); John Smith (to 1990)	John Gallagher	Henry Merling	Tom Murray	Don Ross
1985–1988	1985	Bob Morrow	Mary Kiss	Terry Cooke	Vince Agro	Bill McCulloch	Brian Hinkley	Pat Valeriano	David Christopherson	Geraldine Copps	Shirley Collins	Reg Wheeler	John Smith	Paul Cowell	John Gallagher	Henry Merling	Tom Murray	Don Ross
Ward Boundary Redistribution
1982–1985	1982	Bob Morrow	Mary Kiss	Peter Peterson	Vince Agro	Bill McCulloch	Brian Hinkley	Mike Davison	Don Gray	Vince Scott	Shirley Collins	Fred Lombardo	Ian Stout	Paul Cowell	Bruce Charlton	Henry Merling	Tom Murray	Jim Bethune
1980–1982	1980	Bill Powell	Paul Drage	Peter Peterson	Vince Agro	Bill McCulloch	Brian Hinkley	Pat Valeriano	Don Gray	David Lawrence	Reg Wheeler	Fred Lombardo	Ian Stout	Paul Cowell	Jim Bethune	Henry Merling	Ken Edge	James MacDonald

=== Hamilton City Councils and Boards of Control (1910–1980) ===
Hamilton City Councillors
Council	Election	Mayor	Board of Control				Ward 1		Ward 2		Ward 3		Ward 4		Ward 5		Ward 6		Ward 7		Ward 8	
1978–1980	1978	Jack MacDonald	Bob Morrow	Jim Bethune	Vince Agro	Pat Valeriano	Kay Drage	Peter Peterson	Ed Fisher	Bill McCulloch	Pat Ford	Brian Hinkley	Don Gray	Dave Lawrence	Fred Lombardo	Reg Wheeler	Olive Ritchie	Jim Stowe	Ted McMeekin	Henry Merling	Ken Edge	James MacDonald
1976–1978	1976	Jack MacDonald	Bob Morrow	Jim Bethune	Ian Stout	Pat Valeriano	Kay Drage	Dennis Carson	Ed Fisher	Bill McCulloch	Pat Ford	Brian Hinkley	Don Gray	Dave Lawrence	Fred Lombardo	Reg Wheeler	Olive Ritchie	Jim Stowe	Ted McMeekin	Henry Merling	Ken Edge	James MacDonald
1973–1976	1973	Vince Agro (from 1976); Victor Copps (to 1976)	Bob Morrow	Jim Bethune	Vince Agro	Jim Campbell	Kay Drage (by-election victor); Reg Swanborough (died in office)	Dennis Carson	Charles Cupido	Bill McCulloch	Pat Ford	Pat Valeriano	Don Gray	Dave Lawrence	Fred Lombardo	Reg Wheeler	Ian Stout	Jim Stowe	Bill Scandlan	Henry Merling	Ken Edge	James MacDonald
1972–1973	1972	Victor Copps	Bob Morrow	Jim Bethune	Anne Jones	Jim Custeau	Reg Swanborough	Dennis Carson	Vince Agro	Bill McCulloch	Pat Ford	Pat Valeriano	Don Gray	Dave Lawrence	Fred Lombardo	Reg Wheeler	Ian Stout	Jim Stowe	Bill Scandlan	Jim Kern	Ken Edge	James MacDonald
1970–1972	1970	Victor Copps	Herman Turkstra	Jim Bethune	Anne Jones	Jim Campbell	Bob Morrow	Malcolm (Mac) Cline	Vince Agro	Bill McCulloch	Aldo Poloniato	Pat Valeriano	Jim Custeau	Dave Lawrence	Fred Lombardo	Reg Wheeler	Robert Ford	Jim Stowe	Bill Scandlan	Jim Kern	Ken Edge	James MacDonald
Ward Boundary Redistribution
Council	Election	Mayor	Board of Control				Ward 1		Ward 2		Ward 3		Ward 4		Ward 5		Ward 6		Ward 7		Ward 8	
1968–1970	1968	Victor Copps	Anne Jones	Jim Campbell	Jack MacDonald	Bill Foley	Bob Morrow	Jim McKeon	Vince Agro	Bill McCulloch	Aldo Poloniato	Bill Scandlan	Joseph Kostyk	Bill Powell	Jim Custeau	Dave Lawrence	Reg Wheeler	Fred Whitehouse	Jim Stowe	Robert Ford	Jim Bethune	James MacDonald
1966–1968	1966	Victor Copps	Anne Jones	Jim Campbell	Jack MacDonald	Bill Foley	Malcolm (Mac) Cline	Jim McKeon	Vince Agro	Thomas Doyle	Stanley Dudzic	Bill Scandlan	Joseph Kostyk	Bill Powell	Jim Custeau	Dave Lawrence	Reg Wheeler	Fred Whitehouse	Jim Stowe	John Smith	Jim Bethune	James MacDonald
1964–1966	1964	Victor Copps	Archie McCoy	Jim Campbell	Brian Morison	Leslie Parker	Malcolm (Mac) Cline	Anne Jones	Vince Agro	Bill McCulloch	Stanley Dudzic	Bill Scandlan	Joseph Kostyk	Bill Powell	Jim Custeau	Dave Lawrence	Reg Wheeler	Fred Whitehouse	Bill Foley	John Smith	Jim Bethune	James MacDonald
1962–1964	1962	Victor Copps	Archie McCoy	Ada Pritchard	Brian Morison	Sam Parker	Malcolm (Mac) Cline	Anne Jones	Frank Dillon	Joseph Macaluso	Stanley Dudzic	Hugh Brown	Joseph Lanza	Bill Powell	Jim Custeau	Dave Lawrence	Reg Wheeler	Fred Whitehouse	Bill Foley	Jack McLaren	Jim Bethune	James MacDonald
1960–1962	1960	Lloyd Jackson	Archie McCoy	Ada Pritchard	Jack MacDonald	Victor Copps	Malcolm (Mac) Cline	Ross Fischer	Frank Dillon	Joseph Macaluso	John Munro	Hugh Brown	Joseph Kostyk	Bill Powell	Jim Custeau	Dave Lawrence	Reg Wheeler	Fred Whitehouse	Bill Foley	Jim Campbell	Brian Morison	James MacDonald
Ward Boundary Redistribution
Council	Election	Mayor	Board of Control				Ward 1		Ward 2		Ward 3		Ward 4		Ward 5		Ward 6		Ward 7		Ward 8	
1958-1960	1958	Lloyd Jackson	Archie McCoy	Ada Pritchard	Jack MacDonald	Sam Parker	Jack McLaren	Bill Thompson	John Munro	Hugh Brown	Ramsey Evans	Margaret Standen	Ross Fischer	Malcolm (Mac) Cline	Frank Dillon	Fred Partridge	Joseph Lanza	James Murdock	Dave Lawrence	Fred Whitehouse	Brian Morison	Ray Edwards
1956-1958	1956	Lloyd Jackson	Archie McCoy	Ada Pritchard	Samuel Baggs	Sam Parker	Jack McLaren	Joseph Dubeck (From June, 1958); Roy Aindow (To June, 1958)	John Munro	Hugh Brown	Ramsey Evans	David Duncan	Ross Fischer	Malcolm (Mac) Cline	Frank Dillon	Fred Partridge	Joseph Lanza	Malcolm Heddle	Dave Lawrence	Fred Whitehouse	Brian Morison	Ken Crockett
1954-1956	1954	Lloyd Jackson	Samuel Lawrence	Ada Pritchard	Jack MacDonald	Sam Parker	Bill Thompson	Roy Aindow	John Munro	Hugh Brown	Ramsey Evans	David Duncan	Charles McCabe	Malcolm (Mac) Cline	Frank Dillon	Archie McCoy	Joseph Lanza	Malcolm Heddle	Dave Lawrence	William Harris	Brian Morison	Ken Crockett
1953-1954	1953	Lloyd Jackson	Samuel Lawrence	Samuel Baggs	Jack MacDonald	Sam Parker	Bill Thompson	John Lewington	Marvin Farewell	Hugh Brown	Ramsey Evans	Ada Pritchard	Charles McCabe	Malcolm (Mac) Cline	Frank Dillon	Archie McCoy	Joseph Lanza	Malcolm Heddle	Dave Lawrence	William Harris	Brian Morison	Ken Crockett
1952-1953	1952	Lloyd Jackson	Samuel Lawrence	Samuel Baggs	Jack MacDonald	Sam Parker	Bill Thompson	John Lewington	Marvin Farewell	Hugh Brown	George Shaver	Ada Pritchard	Robert Purnell	Malcolm (Mac) Cline	Frank Dillon	Fred Partridge	Joseph Lanza	Bill Walsh	Dave Lawrence	William Harris	Brian Morison	Ken Crockett
1951-1952	1951	Lloyd Jackson	Samuel Lawrence	Samuel Baggs	Henry Arnott Hicks	Sam Parker	Bill Thompson	Russell Reinke	Charles McCabe	Hugh Brown	George Shaver	Ada Pritchard	Robert Purnell	Malcolm (Mac) Cline	Frank Dillon	Fred Partridge	Jack MacDonald	Lewis Ross	Dave Lawrence	William Harris	Ed Crockett	Ken Crockett
1950-1951	1950	Lloyd Jackson	Samuel Lawrence	William Warrender	Henry Arnott Hicks	Sam Parker	Bill Thompson	Russell Reinke	Charles McCabe	Hugh Brown	George Shaver	Samuel Baggs	Robert Purnell	Malcolm (Mac) Cline	Frank Dillon	Fred Partridge	Jack MacDonald	Lewis Ross	Roy Aindow	John Hancox	Ed Crockett	Ken Crockett
Ward Boundary Redistribution
Council	Election	Mayor	Board of Control				Ward 1		Ward 2		Ward 3		Ward 4		Ward 5		Ward 6		Ward 7		Ward 8	
1949-1950	1949	Lloyd Jackson	Ellen Fairclough	William Warrender	Henry Arnott Hicks	Sam Parker	Bessie Hughton	Ken Crockett	Charles McCabe	Hugh Brown	Warren Laird Jennings	Samuel Baggs	Robert Purnell	Malcolm (Mac) Cline	Doug Gordon	Fred Partridge	Malcolm Heddle	John Hodgson	Fred Hayward	Jack MacDonald	Roy Aindow	Russell Reinke
1948-1949	1948	Sam Lawrence	Andy Frame	Hugh McIntyre	Walter Chadwick	Sam Parker	Bessie Hughton	Henry Arnott Hicks	William Warrender	Hugh Brown	Warren Laird Jennings	Ellen Fairclough	Peter McCulloch	Malcolm (Mac) Cline	Doug Gordon	Frank Dillon	Malcolm Heddle	John Hodgson	Fred Hayward	Peter Dunlop	Roy Aindow	James Newell
1947-1948	1947	Sam Lawrence	Andy Frame	Hugh McIntyre	Walter Chadwick	Sam Parker	Bessie Hughton	Henry Arnott Hicks	William Warrender	Hugh Brown	John Stewart	Ellen Fairclough	Peter McCulloch	Thomas Marshall	Doug Gordon	Frank Dillon	Malcolm Heddle	John Hodgson	Fred Hayward	Peter Dunlop	Joseph Easton	James Newell
1946-1947	1946	Sam Lawrence	Andy Frame	Hugh McIntyre	Nora-Frances Henderson	Helen Anderson-Coulson	Sam Parker	Henry Arnott Hicks	William Warrender	Hugh Brown	John Stewart	Ellen Fairclough	Peter McCulloch	Warren Laird Jennings	Fred Partridge	Frank Dillon	Malcolm Heddle	John Hodgson	Fred Hayward	Peter Dunlop	Joseph Easton	James Newell
1945-1946	1945	Sam Lawrence	Andy Frame	Donald Clarke	Nora-Frances Henderson	William Weir	Sam Parker	Herbert Hannah	William Warrender	Hugh Brown	John Stewart	Ellen Fairclough (appointed 1945); Herbert Smye (resigned 1945)	Thomas Marshall	Warren Laird Jennings	Doug Gordon	Frank Dillon	Malcolm Heddle	John Hodgson	Fred Hayward	Helen Anderson-Coulson	Joseph Easton	James Newell
1944-1945	1944	Sam Lawrence	Hugh McIntyre	Donald Clarke	Nora-Frances Henderson	William Weir	Sam Parker	Herbert Hannah	Robert Elliott	Hugh Brown	Vernon Knowles	Herbert Smye	Thomas Marshall	Peter McCulloch	Doug Gordon	Frank Dillon	Malcolm Heddle	John Hodgson	Fred Hayward	Helen Anderson-Coulson	Joseph Easton	James Newell
1943-1944	1943	Sam Lawrence	Hugh McIntyre	Walter Chadwick	Nora-Frances Henderson	William Weir	William McFarland	Herbert Hannah	Robert Elliott	Hugh Brown	Vernon Knowles	Herbert Smye	Thomas Marshall	Peter McCulloch	Doug Gordon	Frank Dillon	Malcolm Heddle	John Hodgson	Fred Hayward	Harry Hunter	Joseph Easton	James Newell
1942-1943	1942	William Morrison	Sam Lawrence	Donald Clarke	Nora-Frances Henderson	William Weir	William McFarland	Sam Parker	Robert Elliott	Hugh Brown	Robert Evans	Herbert Smye	Thomas Marshall	Peter McCulloch	Doug Gordon	Frank Dillon	Malcolm Heddle	John Hodgson	Sam Clarke	Harry Hunter	Joseph Easton	Roy Aindow
1941-1942	1941	William Morrison	Sam Lawrence	Donald Clarke	Nora-Frances Henderson	Andy Frame	William McFarland	Walter Chadwick	William Warrender	Hugh Brown	Robert Evans	Herbert Smye	Hugh McIntyre	Peter McCulloch	Robert Thornberry	Frank Dillon	William Weir	John Hodgson	Sam Clarke	Harry Hunter	Robert Elliott	Roy Aindow
1940-1941	1940	William Morrison	Sam Lawrence	Donald Clarke	Nora-Frances Henderson	Andy Frame	William McFarland	Walter Chadwick	William Warrender	Hugh Brown	Robert Evans	Herbert Smye	William Kennedy	Peter McCulloch	Robert Thornberry	Frank Dillon	William Weir	John Hodgson	Sam Clarke	Archie Burton	Robert Elliott	Roy Aindow
1939-1940	1939	William Morrison	Sam Lawrence	Donald Clarke	Nora-Frances Henderson	Andy Frame	William McFarland	Walter Chadwick	Robert Inch	James Phin	Robert Evans	Herbert Smye	William Kennedy	Peter McCulloch	Robert Thornberry	Thomas White	William Weir	John Hodgson	Harry Hunter	Archie Burton	Robert Elliott	Roy Aindow
1938-1939	1938	William Morrison	Sam Lawrence	Beamer Hopkins	Nora-Frances Henderson	Freeman Treleaven	William McFarland	Walter Chadwick	Robert Inch	James Phin	Robert Evans	Herbert Smye	Hugh McIntyre	Peter McCulloch	Alexander Nelligan	Thomas White	William Weir	John Hodgson	Harry Hunter	Donald Clarke	Robert Elliott	Roy Aindow (appointed); Agnes Sharpe (resigned)
1937-1938	1937	William Morrison	Sam Lawrence	Andy Frame	Nora-Frances Henderson	Freeman Treleaven	William McFarland	Orville Walsh	Beamer Hopkins	James Phin	Robert Evans	Herbert Smye	Hugh McIntyre	Peter McCulloch	Alexander Nelligan	Thomas White	William Weir	John Hodgson	Archie Burton	Donald Clarke	Robert Elliott	Agnes Sharpe
1936-1937	1936	William Morrison	Donald McFarlane	Andy Frame	Nora-Frances Henderson	Freeman Treleaven	William McFarland	Orville Walsh	Beamer Hopkins	James Phin	Robert Evans	Herbert Smye	John Marsh	Peter McCulloch	Alexander Nelligan	Thomas White	William Weir	John Hodgson	Archie Burton	Donald Clarke	Robert Elliott	Agnes Sharpe
1935-1936	1935	William Morrison	Donald McFarlane	Sam Nelson	Nora-Frances Henderson	Freeman Treleaven	William McFarland	Orville Walsh	Beamer Hopkins	William Ainslie	Robert Evans	Herbert Smye	John Marsh	Peter McCulloch	Alexander Nelligan	Thomas White	William Weir	John Hodgson	Archie Burton	Donald Clarke	Robert Elliott	Agnes Sharpe
1934-1935	1934	Herbert Wilton	Donald McFarlane	Septimus Stuart DuMoulin	Nora-Frances Henderson	Freeman Treleaven	William McFarland	Orville Walsh	Franklin Turville	William Ainslie	Robert Evans	William Fick	George Hancock	Arthur Davidson	Alexander Nelligan	Thomas White	William Weir	John Hodgson	Archie Burton	Thomas Lewington	William Harrison	Agnes Sharpe
1933-1934	1933	Herbert Wilton	Donald McFarlane	Septimus Stuart DuMoulin	Sam Lawrence	Freeman Treleaven	William McFarland	Nora-Frances Henderson	Thomas Gallagher	William Ainslie	Robert Evans	William Fick	George Hancock	Arthur Davidson	Charles Aitchison	Thomas White	Archie Pollock	Andy Frame	Sam Clarke	Thomas Lewington	John Mitchell	James Reed
1932-1933	1932	John Peebles	Donald McFarlane	Septimus Stuart DuMoulin	Sam Lawrence	Freeman Treleaven	Andy Gaul	Nora-Frances Henderson	Thomas Gallagher	William Ainslie	Robert Evans	William Fick	George Hancock	Arthur Davidson	Charles Aitchison	Thomas White	Archie Pollock	Andy Frame	Sam Clarke	Thomas Lewington	John Mitchell	James Reed
1931-1932	1931	John Peebles	Donald McFarlane	John Bell	Sam Lawrence	Sam Manson	Andy Gaul	Nora-Frances Henderson	Septimus Stuart DuMoulin	William Ainslie	William Hutton	Austin Macauley	George Hancock	Arthur Davidson	Charles Aitchison	John Sherring	Archie Pollock	Andy Frame	Sam Clarke	Archie Burton	John Mitchell	William Dean
Ward Boundary Redistribution
Council	Election	Mayor	Board of Control				Ward 1		Ward 2		Ward 3		Ward 4		Ward 5		Ward 6		Ward 7		Ward 8	

Ran as a CCF candidate
Ran as a NDP candidate
Ran as a Labour or Labour's Voice candidate
Ran as a ILP candidate
Ran as a Communist Party/Labor-Progressive Party candidate
Ran as a Conservative Party candidate
Ran as a Liberal Party candidate
