= 1934 Hamilton, Ontario, municipal election =

1934 Hamilton municipal election
- Monday, December 3, 1934
Candidate	Herbert Wilton	Stuart Smith	John Hunter
Party	Independent	Independent	Communist
Popular vote	30,587	8,577	2,976
Percentage	71.55%	20.06%	7%
Candidate	Thomas Fox	John Cairney
Party	Independent	Independent
Popular vote	428	180
Percentage	1%	0.39%
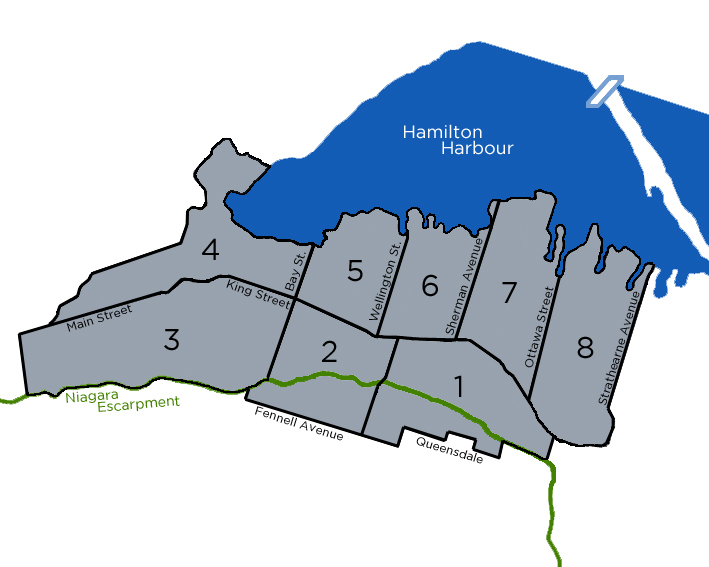
- Each of Hamilton's eight wards. Electors would send two aldermen per ward to City Hall in addition to four controllers and one mayor elected at-large.
Mayor before election
Herbert Wilton
Independent
Elected mayor
Herbert Wilton
Independent

The 1934 Hamilton municipal election was held on December 3, 1934, to select one mayor, four controllers, and sixteen members of the Hamilton, Ontario City Council, two from each of the city's eight wards. Voters also cast ballots for trustees for the public school board.

== Campaign ==
Candidates needed to fulfill a number of requirements to stand for office, namely be:

- An owner or tenant of a property in the city or within five miles of city-limits,
- Entered on the last revised voter's list,
- A British subject,
- Not liable for arrears of taxes.

The election of 1934 was marked by the large number of mayoral candidates, with Herbert Wilton, who had considerable support from the local Conservative political machine, facing challenges from local barrister Stuart Smith, Communist candidate John Hunter, and minor candidates Thomas Fox and John Cairney. While Wilton maintained that he would continue his policy of classical liberal economic policy, Smith campaigned on a platform of reform, advertising that he would "correct the many existing evils by substituting the much needed reforms," and calling for Hamilton's own New Deal.

Having run successfully as a slate for two terms, members of the Economy Slate made no effort to continue their electoral cooperation. Citizens and associations in the city campaigned aggressively against slates, writing letters to the editor to the Spectator and issuing advertisements warning voters to "Beware of Slates." Despite the negative public opinion regarding slates, the Spectator noted that members of the Conservative Party retained a majority of seats on council. The paper noted, "although it has never been a practice for either of the two old line parties to run slates, a check-up of next year's council representatives shows an overwhelming majority of members with Conservative leanings."

The city's branches of the CCF and ILP, who had cooperated in the election of 1933, had dissolved their electoral agreement. Strains caused by the election de facto slate leader Sam Lawrence's to the Ontario Legislature and ideological divisions between each party's local leadership were significant factors in the abandonment of the short-lived electoral cooperation. Both parties nominated candidates, in some occasions against candidates of the other party. Twelve CCF candidates and six ILP candidates contested the election, with only one member of each party being elected. Commenting on the election, the Spectator noted that only "Ward 8 along remains true to [the] divided party."

Also notable were the campaigns of official Liberal Party candidates in Wards 5 and 8. The party had normally avoided official involvement in municipal government, but nominated two candidates from a large pool of members who expressed interest in running. The Spectator reported that the candidates would "uphold Liberal principles in all municipal affairs."

== Mayor ==
Summary of the December 3, 1934 Hamilton, Ontario mayoral election
Candidate	Affiliation	Popular vote		
Candidate	Affiliation	Votes	%	±%
Herbert Wilton (incumbent)	Independent	30,587	71.55%	+14.14%
Stuart Smith	Independent	8,577	20.06%	n/a
John Hunter	Communist	2,976	7%	n/a
Thomas Fox	Independent	428	1%	n/a
John Cairney	Independent	180	0.39%	n/a
Total votes		42,748	100%	
Registered voters		n/a	n/a	n/a
Note: Candidate campaign colours are used as a visual differentiation between candidates and to indicate affiliation.
Sources: "Figures show Wilton given wide support", Hamilton Spectator, Tuesday, December 4, 1934, pp. 15–22.

== Board of Control ==
Summary of the December 3, 1934 Hamilton, Ontario Board of Control election
Candidate	Affiliation	Popular vote		
Candidate	Affiliation	Votes	%	±%
Nora-Frances Henderson	Women's Civic Club	21,545	n/a	n/a
Freeman Treleaven (incumbent)	Independent	19,154	n/a	n/a
Donald MacFarlane (incumbent)	Independent	14,984	n/a	n/a
Septimus DuMoulin (incumbent)	Independent	13,049	n/a	n/a
John Mitchell	CCF	9,799	n/a	n/a
Andy Frame	Independent	9,236	n/a	n/a
Archie Pollock	ILP	8,798	n/a	n/a
James Reed	CCF	8,441	n/a	n/a
Charles Aitchison	ILP	7,015	n/a	n/a
Wallace James	Independent	6,582	n/a	n/a
David Arnott	Communist Party	2,370	n/a	n/a
John Brewer	Independent	449	n/a	n/a
Total votes		n/a	n/a	
Registered voters		n/a	n/a	n/a
Note: Candidate campaign colours are used as a visual differentiation between candidates and to indicate affiliation.
Sources: "Board of Control Summary", Hamilton Spectator, Tuesday, December 4, 1934, pp. 15.

== Aldermen ==
=== Ward One ===
Summary of the December 3, 1934 Hamilton, Ontario Ward One aldermanic election
Candidate	Affiliation	Popular vote		
Candidate	Affiliation	Votes	%	±%
William MacFarland (incumbent)	Independent	4,632	n/a	n/a
Orville Walsh	Independent	3,094	n/a	n/a
Elizabeth Bagshaw	Women's Civic Club	2,278	n/a	n/a
Samuel Flint	CCF	619	n/a	n/a
Robert Sutton	Independent	334	n/a	n/a
Total votes		n/a	n/a	
Registered voters		n/a	n/a	n/a
Note: Candidate campaign colours are used as a visual differentiation between candidates and to indicate affiliation.
Sources: "How Aldermanic Candidates Ran", Hamilton Spectator, Tuesday, December 4, 1934, pp. 15.

=== Ward Two ===
Summary of the December 3, 1934 Hamilton, Ontario Ward Two aldermanic election
Candidate	Affiliation	Popular vote		
Candidate	Affiliation	Votes	%	±%
Franklin Turville	Independent	2,752	n/a	n/a
William Ainsley (incumbent)	Independent	2,411	n/a	n/a
Lorne Gatenby	Independent	1,520	n/a	n/a
Total votes		n/a	n/a	
Registered voters		n/a	n/a	n/a
Note: Candidate campaign colours are used as a visual differentiation between candidates and to indicate affiliation.
Sources: "How Aldermanic Candidates Ran", Hamilton Spectator, Tuesday, December 4, 1934, pp. 15.

=== Ward Three ===
Summary of the December 3, 1934 Hamilton, Ontario Ward Three aldermanic election
Candidate	Affiliation	Popular vote		
Candidate	Affiliation	Votes	%	±%
Robert Evans (incumbent)	Independent	2,412	n/a	n/a
William Fick (incumbent)	Independent	2,069	n/a	n/a
Austin Macaulay	Independent	1,443	n/a	n/a
D'Arcy Lee	Independent	1,230	n/a	n/a
Arthur Patrick	CCF	992	n/a	n/a
George Dunsmure	Independent	503	n/a	n/a
Total votes		n/a	n/a	
Registered voters		n/a	n/a	n/a
Note: Candidate campaign colours are used as a visual differentiation between candidates and to indicate affiliation.
Sources: "How Aldermanic Candidates Ran", Hamilton Spectator, Tuesday, December 4, 1934, pp. 15.

=== Ward Four ===
Summary of the December 3, 1934 Hamilton, Ontario Ward Four aldermanic election
Candidate	Affiliation	Popular vote		
Candidate	Affiliation	Votes	%	±%
George Hancock (incumbent)	Independent	1,829	n/a	n/a
Arthur Davidson (incumbent)	Independent	1,707	n/a	n/a
William Thompson	Independent	1,207	n/a	n/a
Peter McCulloch	Independent	1,032	n/a	n/a
Charles Pollicott	ILP	849	n/a	n/a
James Newell	CCF	433	n/a	n/a
Total votes		n/a	n/a	
Registered voters		n/a	n/a	n/a
Note: Candidate campaign colours are used as a visual differentiation between candidates and to indicate affiliation.
Sources: "How Aldermanic Candidates Ran", Hamilton Spectator, Tuesday, December 4, 1934, pp. 15.

=== Ward Five ===
Summary of the December 3, 1934 Hamilton, Ontario Ward Five aldermanic election
Candidate	Affiliation	Popular vote		
Candidate	Affiliation	Votes	%	±%
Thomas White (incumbent)	Independent	2,581	n/a	n/a
Alexander Nelligan	Independent	1,967	n/a	n/a
Albert Marck	Liberal	1,223	n/a	n/a
John Rae	CCF	678	n/a	n/a
Christopher Hennessy	Independent	372	n/a	n/a
Michael Hutchison	Independent	317	n/a	n/a
Total votes		n/a	n/a	
Registered voters		n/a	n/a	n/a
Note: Candidate campaign colours are used as a visual differentiation between candidates and to indicate affiliation.
Sources: "How Aldermanic Candidates Ran", Hamilton Spectator, Tuesday, December 4, 1934, pp. 15.

=== Ward Six ===
Summary of the December 3, 1934 Hamilton, Ontario Ward Six aldermanic election
Candidate	Affiliation	Popular vote		
Candidate	Affiliation	Votes	%	±%
William Weir	Independent	1,986	n/a	n/a
John Hodgson	Independent	1,867	n/a	n/a
William Snyder	Independent	1,325	n/a	n/a
James Morris	Independent	1,014	n/a	n/a
Frank Thompson	CCF	937	n/a	n/a
John Sherring	Independent	856	n/a	n/a
Thomas Barnes	Independent	650	n/a	n/a
Harold Harrison	CCF	628	n/a	n/a
John Wise	Independent	599	n/a	n/a
James Johnson	Independent	359	n/a	n/a
William Wardley	ILP	297	n/a	n/a
Charles Servos	Independent	286	n/a	n/a
Harvey Hunt	Independent	188	n/a	n/a
Edward Langley	Independent	93	n/a	n/a
Total votes		n/a	n/a	
Registered voters		n/a	n/a	n/a
Note: Candidate campaign colours are used as a visual differentiation between candidates and to indicate affiliation.
Sources: "How Aldermanic Candidates Ran", Hamilton Spectator, Tuesday, December 4, 1934, pp. 15.

=== Ward Seven ===
Summary of the December 3, 1934 Hamilton, Ontario Ward Seven aldermanic election
Candidate	Affiliation	Popular vote		
Candidate	Affiliation	Votes	%	±%
Thomas Lewington (incumbent)	Independent	2,332	n/a	n/a
Archie Burton	Independent	1,608	n/a	n/a
Samuel Clarke (incumbent)	ILP	1,567	n/a	n/a
William Clark	CCF	1,183	n/a	n/a
Joseph Morris	CCF	929	n/a	n/a
Total votes		n/a	n/a	
Registered voters		n/a	n/a	n/a
Note: Candidate campaign colours are used as a visual differentiation between candidates and to indicate affiliation.
Sources: "How Aldermanic Candidates Ran", Hamilton Spectator, Tuesday, December 4, 1934, pp. 15.

=== Ward Eight ===
Summary of the December 3, 1934 Hamilton, Ontario Ward Eight aldermanic election
Candidate	Affiliation	Popular vote		
Candidate	Affiliation	Votes	%	±%
Agnes Sharpe	CCF	3,042	n/a	n/a
William Harrison	ILP	1,810	n/a	n/a
Roy Aindow	CCF	1,319	n/a	n/a
Robert Elliot	Independent	1,238	n/a	n/a
William Hale	Liberal	979	n/a	n/a
Frank Stockdale	Independent	337	n/a	n/a
George Knowles	Independent	272	n/a	n/a
Total votes		n/a	n/a	
Registered voters		n/a	n/a	n/a
Note: Candidate campaign colours are used as a visual differentiation between candidates and to indicate affiliation.
Sources: "How Aldermanic Candidates Ran", Hamilton Spectator, Tuesday, December 4, 1934, pp. 15.
