= 1932 Hamilton, Ontario, municipal election =

Election in Canada

1932 Hamilton municipal election
- Monday, December 5, 1932
Candidate	John Peebles	John Bell
Party	Independent	Independent
Popular vote	24,499	18,238
Percentage	57.32%	42.68%
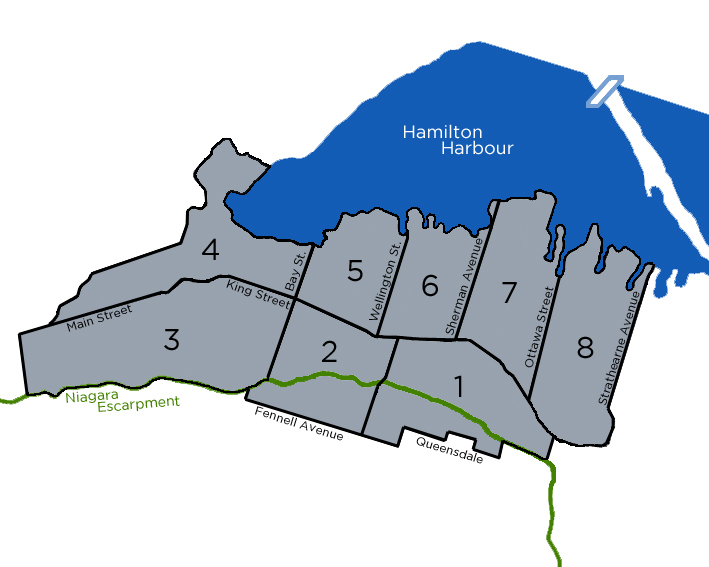
- Each of Hamilton's eight wards. Electors would send two aldermen per ward to City Hall in addition to four controllers and one mayor elected at-large.
Mayor before election
John Peebles
Independent
Elected mayor
John Peebles
Independent

The 1932 Hamilton municipal election was held on December 5, 1932, to select one mayor, four controllers, and sixteen members of the Hamilton, Ontario City Council, two from each of the city's eight wards. Voters also cast ballots for trustees for the public school board.

== Campaign ==
Held during the economic depression of the 1930s, the election was marked by differences between two ideologically different groups. The Hamilton-branch of the Independent Labour Party stood on a social-democratic platform of advancing the rights of working people and trade unionists in the light of the economic situation of the time. Alternately, a number of candidates stood on a platform that advocated a classical liberal economic policy and referred to themselves as the Policy For 1933 slate. Each group ran candidates for the Board of Control and aldermen, but neither mayoral candidate identified as a member of either slate. Two Communist Party candidates stood in the traditionally working class Wards Seven and Eight in the city's north-end.

The city's Home Owners' Association endorsed candidates based on their policies and opposition to a council-manager system of municipal government. As a group of property owners, the association endorsed right-leaning candidates of whom a majority were also affiliated with the Policy for 1933 group.

The election was notable for the loss of five incumbent aldermen. Four of the aldermen were independents, three of whom were defeated by Policy for 1933 candidates. One Policy for 1933 alderman was defeated by an Independent Labour Party candidate in Ward Eight, the only instance of the party defeating a sitting right-wing alderman.

== Mayor ==
Summary of the December 5, 1932 Hamilton, Ontario mayoral election
Candidate	Affiliation	Popular vote		
Candidate	Affiliation	Votes	%	±%
John Peebles (incumbent)	Independent	24,499	57.32%	-17.54%
John Bell	Independent	18,238	42.68%	n/a
Total votes		42,737	100%	
Registered voters		n/a	n/a	n/a
Note: Candidate campaign colours are used as a visual differentiation between candidates and to indicate affiliation.
Sources: "Peebles Re-Elected By Large Majority", Hamilton Spectator, Tuesday, December 6, 1932, pp. 7.

== Board of Control ==
Summary of the December 5, 1932 Hamilton, Ontario Board of Control election
Candidate	Affiliation	Popular vote		
Candidate	Affiliation	Votes	%	±%
Freeman Treleaven	Policy for 1933	23,309	n/a	n/a
Sam Lawrence (incumbent)	Independent Labour Party	21,323	n/a	n/a
Donald MacFarlane (incumbent)	Policy for 1933	19,816	n/a	n/a
Septimus DuMoulin	Policy for 1933	18,308	n/a	n/a
Cranmer Riselay	Independent	14,433	n/a	n/a
Samuel Weaver	Independent	8,243	n/a	n/a
Alexander McLennan	Independent	5,527	n/a	n/a
Thomas Morris	Independent	4,729	n/a	n/a
Total votes		n/a	n/a	
Registered voters		n/a	n/a	n/a
Note: Candidate campaign colours are used as a visual differentiation between candidates and to indicate affiliation.
Sources: "Board of Control Summary", Hamilton Spectator, Tuesday, December 6, 1932, pp. 16.

== Aldermen ==
=== Ward One ===
Summary of the December 5, 1932 Hamilton, Ontario Ward One aldermanic election
Candidate	Affiliation	Popular vote		
Candidate	Affiliation	Votes	%	±%
Andy Gaul (incumbent)	Policy for 1933	3,469	n/a	n/a
Nora Frances Henderson (incumbent)	Independent	3,448	n/a	n/a
William MacFarland	Independent	3,275	n/a	n/a
Herbert Wilton	Independent	1,789	n/a	n/a
Total votes		n/a	n/a	
Registered voters		n/a	n/a	n/a
Note: Candidate campaign colours are used as a visual differentiation between candidates and to indicate affiliation.
Sources: "How Aldermanic Candidates Ran," Hamilton Spectator, Tuesday, December 6, 1932, pp. 16.

=== Ward Two ===
Summary of the December 5, 1932 Hamilton, Ontario Ward Two aldermanic election
Candidate	Affiliation	Popular vote		
Candidate	Affiliation	Votes	%	±%
William Ainsley (incumbent)	Independent Liberal	2,365	n/a	n/a
Thomas Gallagher	Policy for 1933	1,576	n/a	n/a
Gordon Flett	Independent	1,265	n/a	n/a
William McClemont	Independent	1,262	n/a	n/a
John Halcrow	Independent Labour Party	1,234	n/a	n/a
Total votes		n/a	n/a	
Registered voters		n/a	n/a	n/a
Note: Candidate campaign colours are used as a visual differentiation between candidates and to indicate affiliation.
Sources: "How Aldermanic Candidates Ran," Hamilton Spectator, Tuesday, December 6, 1932, pp. 16.

=== Ward Three ===
Summary of the December 5, 1932 Hamilton, Ontario Ward Three aldermanic election
Candidate	Affiliation	Popular vote		
Candidate	Affiliation	Votes	%	±%
William Fick	Policy for 1933	2,643	n/a	n/a
Robert Evans	Policy for 1933	2,611	n/a	n/a
William Hutton (incumbent)	Independent	1,649	n/a	n/a
Austin Macaulay (incumbent)	Independent	1,568	n/a	n/a
Edward Bryan	Independent Labour Party	956	n/a	n/a
Total votes		n/a	n/a	
Registered voters		n/a	n/a	n/a
Note: Candidate campaign colours are used as a visual differentiation between candidates and to indicate affiliation.
Sources: "How Aldermanic Candidates Ran", Hamilton Spectator, Tuesday, December 6, 1932, pp. 16.

=== Ward Four ===
Summary of the December 5, 1932 Hamilton, Ontario Ward Four aldermanic election
Candidate	Affiliation	Popular vote		
Candidate	Affiliation	Votes	%	±%
George Hancock (incumbent)	Policy for 1933	2,103	n/a	n/a
Arthur Davidson (incumbent)	Policy for 1933	1,893	n/a	n/a
Thomas O'Heir	Independent	1,242	n/a	n/a
Henry Eickhoff	Independent Labour Party	1,101	n/a	n/a
John Brewer	Independent	281	n/a	n/a
Total votes		n/a	n/a	
Registered voters		n/a	n/a	n/a
Note: Candidate campaign colours are used as a visual differentiation between candidates and to indicate affiliation.
Sources: "How Aldermanic Candidates Ran", Hamilton Spectator, Tuesday, December 6, 1932, pp. 16.

=== Ward Five ===
Summary of the December 5, 1932 Hamilton, Ontario Ward Five aldermanic election
Candidate	Affiliation	Popular vote		
Candidate	Affiliation	Votes	%	±%
Thomas White	Policy for 1933	1,868	n/a	n/a
Charles Aitchison (incumbent)	Independent Labour Party	1,558	n/a	n/a
Alexander Nelligan	Independent	1,184	n/a	n/a
John Sherring (incumbent)	Independent	906	n/a	n/a
Pierce Somerville	Independent	621	n/a	n/a
David Atkins	Independent	504	n/a	n/a
Christopher Hennessy	Independent Labour Party	419	n/a	n/a
Thomas Allison	Independent	347	n/a	n/a
Michael Cummings	Independent	251	n/a	n/a
Michael Licata	Independent	241	n/a	n/a
Total votes		n/a	n/a	
Registered voters		n/a	n/a	n/a
Note: Candidate campaign colours are used as a visual differentiation between candidates and to indicate affiliation.
Sources: "How Aldermanic Candidates Ran", Hamilton Spectator, Tuesday, December 6, 1932, pp. 16.

=== Ward Six ===
Summary of the December 5, 1932 Hamilton, Ontario Ward Six aldermanic election
Candidate	Affiliation	Popular vote		
Candidate	Affiliation	Votes	%	±%
Archie Pollock (incumbent)	Independent Labour Party	2,656	n/a	n/a
Andy Frame (incumbent)	Independent	2,531	n/a	n/a
John Hodgson	Independent	2,338	n/a	n/a
Herbert Wise	Independent	1,283	n/a	n/a
Wilfred Bircher	Independent Labour Party	662	n/a	n/a
Michael Hutchison	Independent	470	n/a	n/a
Edward Fernside	Independent	422	n/a	n/a
Total votes		n/a	n/a	
Registered voters		n/a	n/a	n/a
Note: Candidate campaign colours are used as a visual differentiation between candidates and to indicate affiliation.
Sources: "How Aldermanic Candidates Ran", Hamilton Spectator, Tuesday, December 6, 1932, pp. 16.

=== Ward Seven ===
Summary of the December 5, 1932 Hamilton, Ontario Ward Seven aldermanic election
Affiliation	Candidate	Votes	Elected
Independent	Thomas Lewington	1,940	✓
Independent Labour	Samuel Clarke (incumbent)	1,905	✓
Independent	Archie Burton (incumbent)	1,635	
Communist	Elizabeth Graham	725	
Independent Labour	Arthur Williams	723	
Independent	Thomas Keith	553	
Independent	Melville Johnson	396	
Note: Candidate campaign colours are used as a visual differentiation between candidates and to indicate affiliation.
Sources: "How Aldermanic Candidates Ran", Hamilton Spectator, Tuesday, December 6, 1932, pp. 16.

=== Ward Eight ===
Summary of the December 5, 1932 Hamilton, Ontario Ward Eight aldermanic election
Candidate	Affiliation	Popular vote		
Candidate	Affiliation	Votes	%	±%
John Mitchell (incumbent)	Independent Labour Party	3,331	n/a	n/a
James Reed	Independent Labour Party	2,203	n/a	n/a
Archie Burton (incumbent)	Policy for 1933	2,089	n/a	n/a
James Walker	Communist Party	1,288	n/a	n/a
Nathaniel Moore	Independent	853	n/a	n/a
Total votes		n/a	n/a	
Registered voters		n/a	n/a	n/a
Note: Candidate campaign colours are used as a visual differentiation between candidates and to indicate affiliation.
Sources: "How Aldermanic Candidates Ran", Hamilton Spectator, Tuesday, December 6, 1932, pp. 16.
