= 1933 Hamilton, Ontario, municipal election =

1933 Hamilton municipal election
- Monday, December 4, 1933
Candidate	Herbert Wilton	John Peebles
Party	Independent	Independent
Popular vote	24,140	18,238
Percentage	57.41%	42.59%
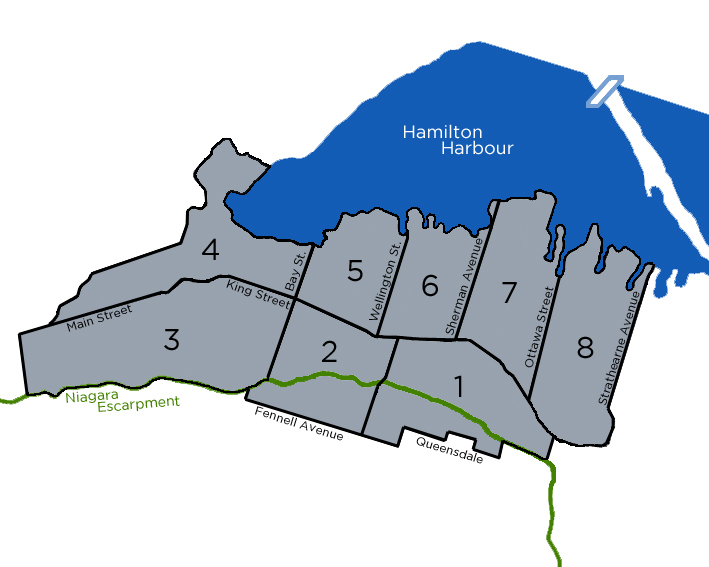
- Each of Hamilton's eight wards. Electors sent two aldermen per ward to City Hall, in addition to four controllers and one mayor elected at-large.
Mayor before election
John Peebles
Independent
Elected mayor
Herbert Wilton
Independent

The 1933 Hamilton municipal election was held on December 4, 1933, to select one mayor, four controllers, and sixteen members of the Hamilton, Ontario City Council, two from each of the city's eight wards. Voters also cast ballots for trustees for the public school board.

== Campaign ==
The civic election of 1933 saw a decline in support for sitting mayor John Peebles, who faced increasing attacks from both the right and left. In the months leading up to the vote, local communists sought municipal support for their campaign against discrimination. Peebles vocally opposed the campaign and objected to the 'tone' of the groups' communication. Having been heckled by protesters angry about hunger in the city during his nomination meeting, Peebles' popularity began to slip with the electorate. Despite this, the mayor received support from the Hamilton Spectator, highlighting his record on the economy and poverty in the city.

Stemming from their success in the previous election, the Policy for 1933 group changed their name to the Economy Slate, running fifteen candidates, twelve of whom were sitting controllers and aldermen. Advocating a smaller city budget and a low tax rate, the Economy Slate continued to press for classical liberal economic policies that were in line with the early policies of the Bennet government in Ottawa. Right-leaning alderman Nora-Frances Henderson, though not asked to join the Economy Slate, campaigned as an independent member of the slate, advertising that she would uphold their principles on council.

The local branch of the Independent Labour Party opted to join forces with the newly founded Cooperative Commonwealth Federation and run candidates on a unified ticket. Distancing themselves from radical unionists and right-leaning aldermen, the slate ran advertisements that attacked both candidates from the Communist Party and the newly constituted Economy Slate.

On election night, Wilton won the election with the help of area Conservatives with whom he was affiliated. Despite losing Andy Gaul of Ward One, the Economy Slate grew from ten members to twelve, with Nora-Frances Henderson and Andy Frame supporting the slate in principle, despite not receiving support from the group. The extension of endorsement to the Liberal-affiliated William Ainsley and Conservative Thomas Lewington gave the group a commanding majority on council.

Despite the unified CCF-ILP slate that contested the election, the group failed to secure more seats than the year prior. The party maintained its support in the city's working class wards and proved to be competitive in the west-end Ward Four where popular local unionist Charles Pollicott of the Strathcona neighbourhood was the party's candidate, but only elected six members to council, giving them a comparatively small opposition in relation to the strength of the Economy Slate.

== Mayor ==
Summary of the December 4, 1933 Hamilton, Ontario mayoral election
Candidate	Affiliation	Popular vote		
Candidate	Affiliation	Votes	%	±%
Herbert Wilton	Independent	24,140	57.41%	n/a
John Peebles (incumbent)	Independent	17,906	42.59	-14.73%
Total votes		42,046	100%	
Registered voters		n/a	n/a	n/a
Note: Candidate campaign colours are used as a visual differentiation between candidates and to indicate affiliation.
Sources: "How City Voted To Choose Mayor", Hamilton Spectator, Tuesday, December 5, 1933, pp. 17.

== Board of Control ==
Summary of the December 4, 1933 Hamilton, Ontario Board of Control election
Candidate	Affiliation	Popular vote		
Candidate	Affiliation	Votes	%	±%
Sam Lawrence (incumbent)	CCF	22,310	n/a	n/a
Freeman Treleaven (incumbent)	Economy Slate	20,914	n/a	n/a
Donald MacFarlane (incumbent)	Economy Slate	19,114	n/a	n/a
Septimus DuMoulin (incumbent)	Economy Slate	17,653	n/a	n/a
Wallace James	Independent	15,028	n/a	n/a
Charles Smith	CCF	13,695	n/a	n/a
Arthur Avery	Communist Party	3,848	n/a	n/a
Total votes		n/a	n/a	
Registered voters		n/a	n/a	n/a
Note: Candidate campaign colours are used as a visual differentiation between candidates and to indicate affiliation.
Sources: "Board of Control Summary", Hamilton Spectator, Tuesday, December 5, 1932, pp. 16.

== Aldermen ==
=== Ward One ===
Summary of the December 4, 1933 Hamilton, Ontario Ward One aldermanic election
Candidate	Affiliation	Popular vote		
Candidate	Affiliation	Votes	%	±%
Nora Frances Henderson (incumbent)	Independent Economy Slate	3,572	n/a	n/a
William MacFarland	Independent	3,105	n/a	n/a
Andy Gaul (incumbent)	Economy Slate	3,019	n/a	n/a
Charles Killip	CCF	1,166	n/a	n/a
Joseph Harris	Independent	504	n/a	n/a
Total votes		n/a	n/a	
Registered voters		n/a	n/a	n/a
Note: Candidate campaign colours are used as a visual differentiation between candidates and to indicate affiliation.
Sources: "How Aldermanic Candidates Ran", Hamilton Spectator, Tuesday, December 5, 1933, pp. 16.

=== Ward Two ===
Summary of the December 4, 1933 Hamilton, Ontario Ward Two aldermanic election
Candidate	Affiliation	Popular vote		
Candidate	Affiliation	Votes	%	±%
William Ainsley (incumbent)	Economy Slate	2,518	n/a	n/a
Thomas Gallagher (incumbent)	Economy Slate	2,123	n/a	n/a
Samuel Cotterell	Independent	1,489	n/a	n/a
John Halcrow	CCF	1,282	n/a	n/a
Total votes		n/a	n/a	
Registered voters		n/a	n/a	n/a
Note: Candidate campaign colours are used as a visual differentiation between candidates and to indicate affiliation.
Sources: "How Aldermanic Candidates Ran", Hamilton Spectator, Tuesday, December 5, 1933, pp. 16.

=== Ward Three ===
Summary of the December 4, 1933 Hamilton, Ontario Ward Three aldermanic election
Candidate	Affiliation	Popular vote		
Candidate	Affiliation	Votes	%	±%
Robert Evans (incumbent)	Economy Slate	2,446	n/a	n/a
William Fick (incumbent)	Economy Slate	2,156	n/a	n/a
William Hutton	Independent	1,496	n/a	n/a
Austin Macaulay	Independent	1,213	n/a	n/a
Henry Ferguson	CCF	934	n/a	n/a
Samuel Bailey	Independent	398	n/a	n/a
Total votes		n/a	n/a	
Registered voters		n/a	n/a	n/a
Note: Candidate campaign colours are used as a visual differentiation between candidates and to indicate affiliation.
Sources: "How Aldermanic Candidates Ran", Hamilton Spectator, Tuesday, December 5, 1933, pp. 16.

=== Ward Four ===
Summary of the December 4, 1933 Hamilton, Ontario Ward Four aldermanic election
Candidate	Affiliation	Popular vote		
Candidate	Affiliation	Votes	%	±%
George Hancock (incumbent)	Economy Slate	1,829	n/a	n/a
Arthur Davidson (incumbent)	Economy Slate	1,707	n/a	n/a
Charles Pollicott	CCF	1,388	n/a	n/a
William Brown	Independent	1,252	n/a	n/a
Total votes		n/a	n/a	
Registered voters		n/a	n/a	n/a
Note: Candidate campaign colours are used as a visual differentiation between candidates and to indicate affiliation.
Sources: "How Aldermanic Candidates Ran", Hamilton Spectator, Tuesday, December 5, 1933, pp. 16.

=== Ward Five ===
Summary of the December 4, 1933 Hamilton, Ontario Ward Five aldermanic election
Candidate	Affiliation	Popular vote		
Candidate	Affiliation	Votes	%	±%
Thomas White (incumbent)	Economy Slate	1,755	n/a	n/a
Charles Aitchison (incumbent)	CCF	1,616	n/a	n/a
Alexander Nelligan	Economy Slate	1,528	n/a	n/a
John Sherring	Independent	1,106	n/a	n/a
William Peters	CCF	894	n/a	n/a
Bruce Smith	Independent	535	n/a	n/a
David Atkins	Independent	458	n/a	n/a
Total votes		n/a	n/a	
Registered voters		n/a	n/a	n/a
Note: Candidate campaign colours are used as a visual differentiation between candidates and to indicate affiliation.
Sources: "How Aldermanic Candidates Ran", Hamilton Spectator, Tuesday, December 5, 1933, pp. 16.

=== Ward Six ===
Summary of the December 4, 1933 Hamilton, Ontario Ward Six aldermanic election
Candidate	Affiliation	Popular vote		
Candidate	Affiliation	Votes	%	±%
Archie Pollock (incumbent)	CCF	2,815	n/a	n/a
Andy Frame (incumbent)	Independent	2,399	n/a	n/a
John Hodgson	Independent	2,144	n/a	n/a
James Morris	Economy Slate	1,740	n/a	n/a
Frank Thompson	CCF	1,365	n/a	n/a
Edward Fernside	Independent	338	n/a	n/a
Total votes		n/a	n/a	
Registered voters		n/a	n/a	n/a
Note: Candidate campaign colours are used as a visual differentiation between candidates and to indicate affiliation.
Sources: "How Aldermanic Candidates Ran", Hamilton Spectator, Tuesday, December 5, 1933, pp. 16.

=== Ward Seven ===
Summary of the December 4, 1933 Hamilton, Ontario Ward Seven aldermanic election
Candidate	Affiliation	Popular vote		
Candidate	Affiliation	Votes	%	±%
Samuel Clarke (incumbent)	CCF	2,302	n/a	n/a
Thomas Lewington (incumbent)	Economy Slate	2,053	n/a	n/a
Archie Burton	Independent	1,639	n/a	n/a
Frank Reeves	CCF	1,357	n/a	n/a
Elizabeth Graham	Communist Party	642	n/a	n/a
Total votes		n/a	n/a	
Registered voters		n/a	n/a	n/a
Note: Candidate campaign colours are used as a visual differentiation between candidates and to indicate affiliation.
Sources: "How Aldermanic Candidates Ran", Hamilton Spectator, Tuesday, December 5, 1933, pp. 16.

=== Ward Eight ===
Summary of the December 4, 1933 Hamilton, Ontario Ward Eight aldermanic election
Candidate	Affiliation	Popular vote		
Candidate	Affiliation	Votes	%	±%
John Mitchell (incumbent)	CCF	3,751	n/a	n/a
James Reed (incumbent)	CCF	3,399	n/a	n/a
David Richardson	Economy Slate	2,249	n/a	n/a
James Walker	Communist Party	975	n/a	n/a
Total votes		n/a	n/a	
Registered voters		n/a	n/a	n/a
Note: Candidate campaign colours are used as a visual differentiation between candidates and to indicate affiliation.
Sources: "How Aldermanic Candidates Ran", Hamilton Spectator, Tuesday, December 5, 1933, pp. 16.
