= 1950 Hamilton, Ontario, municipal election =

1950 Hamilton municipal election
- December 6, 1950
Candidate	Lloyd Jackson	Helen Anderson Coulson
Party	Independent	Labor-Progressive Party
Popular vote	49,924	8,270
Percentage	85.79%	14.21%
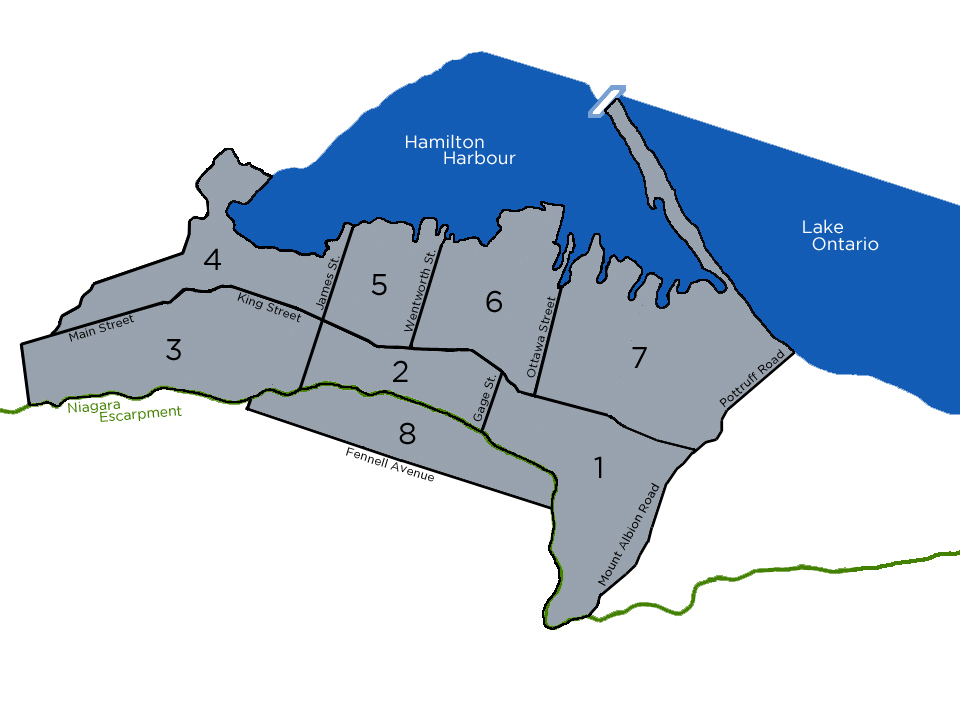
- The wards of the City of Hamilton. Each ward sent two aldermen to city hall, in addition to four controllers and one mayor elected at-large.
Mayor before election
Lloyd Jackson
Independent
Elected mayor
Lloyd Jackson
Independent

The 1950 Hamilton municipal election was held on December 6, 1950, to select one mayor, four controllers, and sixteen members of the Hamilton, Ontario City Council, as well as members of the local board of education. This election was accompanied by six referendums, each dealing with a major issue in the city at the time.

== Referendums ==
Hamilton, Ontario, Municipal referendums, 1950 (money related)
Question	Yes		No		Voter turnout	
Question	Votes	%	Votes	%	Votes	%
"By-law to raise $250,000.00 for a grant to Hamilton College."	13,863	44.03%	17,625	55.97%	31,488	52.75%
"By-law to borrow the sum of $850,000.00 by the issue of debentures for improvements on the Old Jolly Cut Road and to provide four-lane pavement."	19,492	61.73%	12,085	38.27%	31,577	52.90%
"By-law to authorize the issue of debentures for $1,750,000.00 for the purpose of erecting an arena adaptable for auditorium use."	12,107	38.36%	19,456	61.64%	31,563	52.88%
Total eligible voters					59,690	52.98%
Total voters					112,650	100%
Note: Vote totals for each question were different as voters did not need to vote on each question. Note: Only property owners in Hamilton were eligible to vote for money related referendums.

Hamilton, Ontario, Municipal referendums, 1950
Question	Yes		No		Voter turnout	
Question	Votes	%	Votes	%	Votes	%
"Voting on by-law to extend the terms of Council members to two years after the year 1951."	19,591	42.96%	26,015	57.04%	45,606	40.49%
"Are you in favour of the construction of an auditorium building and a gymnasium building upon the assent of the electors at a later date?"	20,665	43.04%	27,347	56.96%	48,012	46.62%
"Are you in favour of public games and sports on the Lord's Day to be regulated by municipal bylaw under the authority of the Lord's Day (Ontario) Act, 1950?"	20,004	37.29%	33,643	62.71%	53,647	47.62%
Total voters					112,650	100%
Note: Vote totals for each question were different as voters did not need to vote on each question. Note: All voters were eligible to vote for questions not related to money.

== Mayoral election ==
In the months before the vote, rumours circulated that the city's popular mayor, Lloyd Jackson, would face a serious contest from a number of prominent Controllers, namely William K. Warrender and Henry Arnott Hicks. Despite their amicable relationship with the mayor, their terms on council were widely viewed as having been spent establishing themselves for a mayoral run.

On November 17, Labor-Progressive Party executive member and former city Controller Helen Anderson Coulson announced her intention to stand against the mayor. Discussions concerning possible opponents for the mayor waned after Warrender and Hicks announced their intentions to stand for re-election to the Board of Control, and the possibility of an acclamation for the mayoralty seemed certain. Coulson made the announcement, stating, "In view of the urgent need for the labour movement to oppose a second term for the sitting incumbent mayor, I have decided...to contest the mayoralty.

Coulson's announcement brought both indignation and dismissal from prominent officials in the city, with Mayor Jackson simply quipping, "Let her come", while Controller Warrender pressed the fact that an avowed Communist was seeking the highest office in the city and the voters should rebuke her for her views. Hicks made a statement to the Spectator the following day, saying that the voters of Hamilton should be, "stirred out of their lethargy to realize that there are Communists in our midst making a bold bid for support.

"Certainly I will be opposed by the big business interests of this city. The Chamber of Commerce, the executives of big corporations of this city; their paid press and radio, will have no sympathy for the policies I am advocating...It is unfortunate that even within the ranks of the labour movement, they have their spokesmen who fall in line with their hysteria."

— Helen Anderson Coulson's nomination speech, November 23, 1950

The city's organized labour movement convened shortly after the close of nominations to study the issue of mayoral endorsement. Rather than take the side of Mayor Jackson, a conservative-minded politician or that of Coulson, an avowed Communist, the city's unions pushed for a stronger get-out-the-vote campaign and made individual endorsements for aldermanic and controller seats.

Jackson was endorsed by a number of groups, most prominently a taxpayers group called Hamiltonians for Sound Civic Government. Calling itself a group of 'public-spirited citizens', Hamiltonians for Sound Civic Government paid for a series of advertisements in the Hamilton Spectator, supporting the mayor and most of the sitting Board of Control.

Coulson was shut out of most advertising in the Spectator, while Jackson maintained a considerable presence, actively highlighting his platform points of reevaluating the city's tax assessment process, constructing more public recreation facilities, including outdoor pools and skating rinks, and improving traffic in the city core.

During the time of the election, Jackson found himself embroiled in controversy over comments made concerning potential annexation of land in Barton Township to the south of the city's limits at Fennell Avenue. City engineers noted that it would be appropriate for Hamilton to take control of lands as far south as Limeridge Road. Controllers debated the necessity of expanding farther onto the Mountain, urging the mayor to instead consider looking to lands along the shore of Lake Ontario.

On election night, Jackson told the Spectator, "I cannot tell you just what it means to one's faith, confidence, and courage to know that the great majority of the citizens are behind one", with the paper editorializing that the win was a "vote of confidence in the mayor's leadership, and a tribute to his vigorous administration of civic affairs."

Summary of the December 6, 1950 Hamilton, Ontario mayoral election
Candidate	Endorsing party	Popular vote	
Candidate	Endorsing party	%	±%
Lloyd Douglas Jackson (incumbent)	Independent	49,924	85.79%
Helen Anderson Coulson	Labor-Progressive	8,270	14.21%
Total votes		58,194	100%
Registered voters		n/a	n/a
Note: Candidate campaign colours are based on their supporting party's or group's colour.
Sources: "Vote for Mayor", Hamilton Spectator, Thursday, December 7, 1950, pg. 19.

== Board of Control ==
=== Candidates ===
Summary of the December 6, 1950 Hamilton, Ontario Board of Control election
Candidate	Endorsing party/group	Popular vote	
Candidate	Endorsing party/group	%	±%
William Kenneth Warrender (incumbent)	Independent	31,014	1
Samuel Leslie Parker (incumbent)	Independent	29,314	2
Henry Arnott Hicks (incumbent)	Liberal	27,723	3
Samuel Lawrence	CCF	24,763	4
Hugh John Sedgwick	Independent	18,730	5
Hugh McIntyre	Independent	18,558	6
Bessie Hughton	Women's Civic Club	15,786	7
Walter Biggs	Independent	11,636	8
Total votes		n/a	100%
Registered voters		n/a	n/a
Note: Candidate campaign colours are based on their supporting party's or group's colour.
Sources: "Hamilton Board of Control Results", Hamilton Spectator, December 11, 1946, News.
