= 1937 Ontario general election =

Canadian provincial election

- October 6, 1937

90 seats in the 20th Legislative Assembly of Ontario 46 seats were needed for a majority
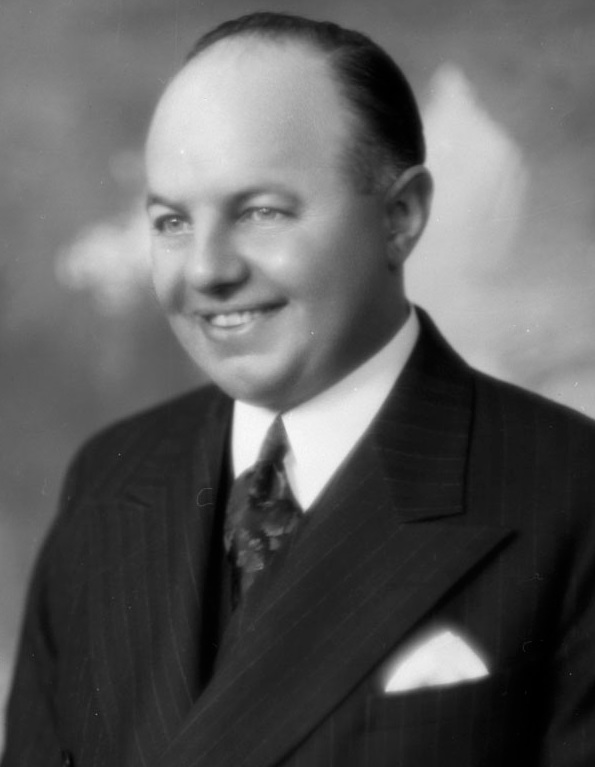

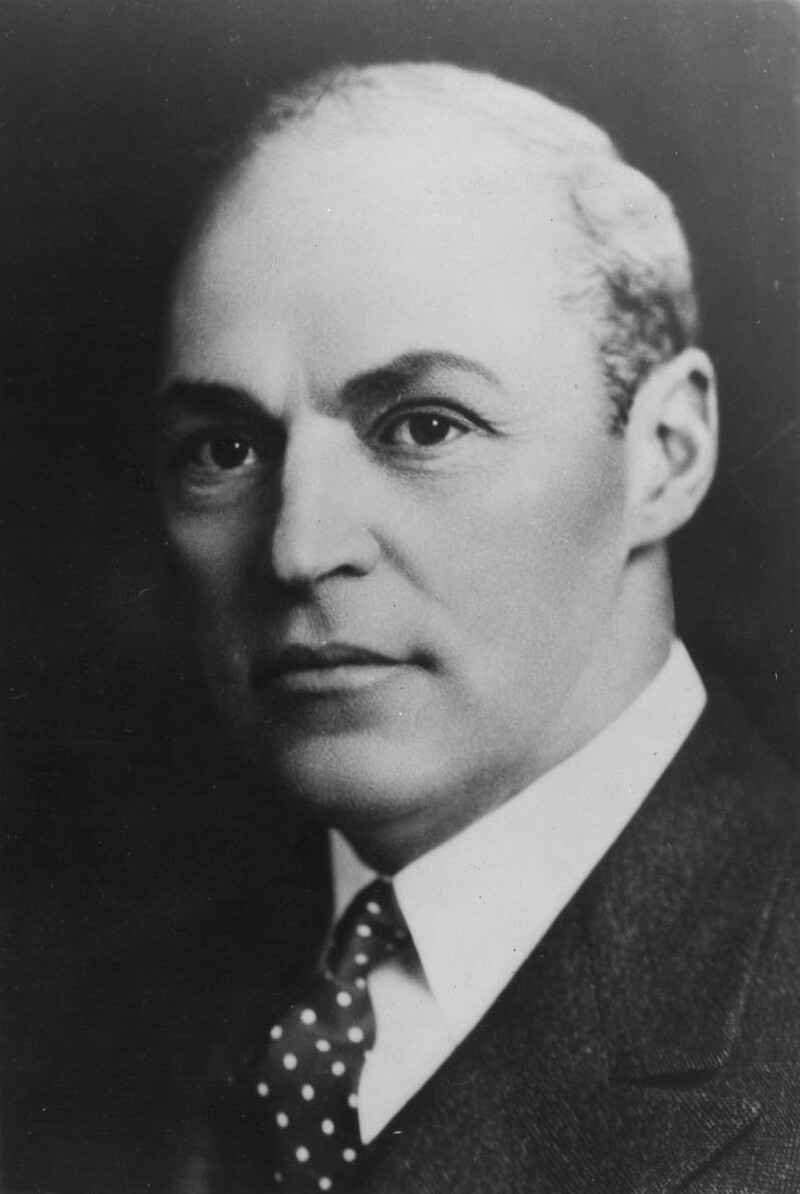

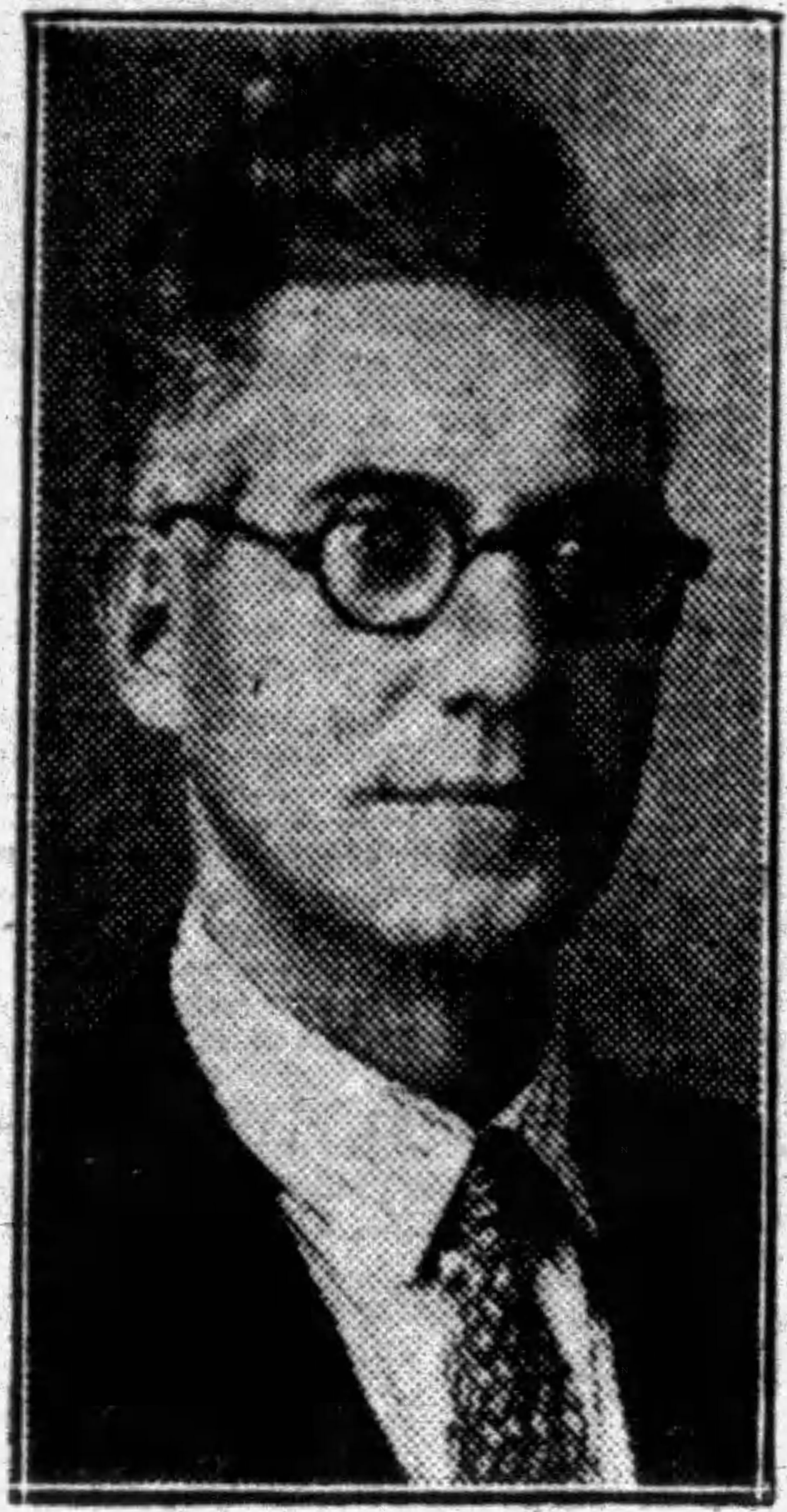
	First party	Second party	Third party
Leader	Mitchell Hepburn	William Earl Rowe	John Mitchell
Party	Liberal	Conservative	Co-operative Commonwealth
Leader since	December 17, 1930	May 28, 1936	April 14, 1934
Leader's seat	Elgin	Ran in Simcoe Centre (Lost)	Ran in Waterloo South (Lost)
Last election	65	17	1
Seats won	63	23	0
Seat change	▼2	▲6	▼1
Percentage	49.5%	39.4%	5.3%
Swing	▲2.4pp	▼0.3pp	▼1.7pp
Premier before election
Mitchell Hepburn
Liberal
Premier after election
Mitchell Hepburn
Liberal

The 1937 Ontario general election was held on October 6, 1937, to elect the 90 Members of the 20th Legislative Assembly of Ontario ("MLAs"). It was the 20th general election held in the province of Ontario.

== Campaign ==
The Ontario Liberal Party, led by Mitchell Hepburn, was re-elected for a second term in government, with a slightly reduced majority in the Legislature.

The Ontario Conservative Party, led by William Earl Rowe, was able to win six additional seats, and continued to form the official opposition.

Meanwhile, the fledgling democratic socialist Co-operative Commonwealth Federation (CCF) ran 37 candidates out of a possible 90, led by party president John Mitchell running in Waterloo South, who also campaigned throughout the province on the party's behalf. The election, however, resulted in a modest decline in popular vote and the loss of the party's sole MLA, Sam Lawrence in Hamilton East.

Incumbent MLA Farquhar Oliver was the last remaining United Farmers of Ontario MLA and ran as the party's sole candidate in the election. In practice, however, he had been a supporter of the Liberal government and would join Hepburn's cabinet in 1940, formally joining the Liberal Party.

Riding contests, by number of candidates (1937)
Candidates	Lib	Con	CCF	L-P	UFO	Lab	Frm-Lab	Ind	Ind-Lib	Ind-Con	Soc-Lab	Other	Total
2	32	34		1	1								68
3	30	31	20	1		1	3	3	4	1	1	1	96
4	17	18	14	1		3	2	3	4	2	6	2	72
5	6	6	5	1		3	1	1		2	4	1	30
Total	85	89	39	4	1	7	6	7	8	5	11	4	266

=== Outcome ===
In 1938, MLAs voted to adopt the title "Member of Provincial Parliament", and became known as "MPPs".

This Ontario election was the last to date in which the winning party (together with effective support from the Liberal-Progressives and UFO, against which they did not field opposing candidates) has won an absolute majority of the popular vote.

== Results ==
Elections to the 20th Parliament of Ontario (1937)
Political party	Party leader	MPPs					Votes		
Political party	Party leader	Candidates	1934	Dissol.	1937	±	#	%	± (pp)
Liberal	Mitchell Hepburn	85	64	66	62	2▼	769,747	48.99	2.43▲
Conservative	William Earl Rowe	89	17	17	23	6▲	619,610	39.44	0.34▼
Liberal–Progressive		4	5	4	3	2▼	24,752	1.58	1.31▼
Independent Liberal		8	–	1	1	1▲	20,776	1.32	0.53▲
United Farmers	Farquhar Oliver	1	1	1	1	Steady	7,296	0.46	0.09▼
Co-operative Commonwealth	John Mitchell (Note: party president)	37	1	1	–	1▼	77,833	4.95	1.66▼
CCF-Labour		2	–	–	–	–	5,746	0.37	1.66▼
Independent		7	1	1	–	1▼	4,039	0.26	0.96▼
Liberal–Labour		–	1	–	–	1▼	Did not campaign		
Farmer–Labour		6	–	–	–	–	14,675	0.93	0.89▲
Labour		7	–	–	–	–	11,807	0.75	0.74▲
Independent Conservative		5	–	–	–	–	8,270	0.53	0.50▲
Labor–Progressive		1	–	–	–	–	3,343	0.21	0.37%▼
Communist		1	–	–	–	–	408	0.03	0.37%▼
Socialist Labor		11	–	–	–	–	2,199	0.14	0.04▲
Social Credit		1	–	–	–	–	538	0.03	New
Independent Labour		1	–	–	–	–	94	0.01	0.02▼
Total		266	90	90	90		1,571,133	100.00%	
Blank and invalid ballots							17,271		
Registered voters / turnout							2,238,230	71.29%	2.32▼

=== Vote and seat summaries ===
Ternary plots - shift of electoral support (1934-1937)
1934

1937
Electoral districts identified by colours of winning parties

Seats and popular vote by party
Party	Seats	Votes	Change (pp)
█ Liberal	62 / 90	48.99%	2.43
█ Conservative	23 / 90	39.44%	-0.34
█ Liberal–Progressive	3 / 90	1.58%	-1.31
█ Co-operative Commonwealth	0 / 90	5.32%	-1.66
█ Other	2 / 90	4.67%	0.88

=== Synopsis of results ===
Results by riding - 1937 Ontario general election
Riding	Winning party						Turnout (Note: including spoilt ballots)	Votes												
Name (Note: order is as given in EO reports)	1934	Party	Votes	Share	Margin #	Margin %	Turnout	Lib	Con	CCF (Note: Includes CCf-Labour candidates)	L-Prog	UFO	Lab	F-Lab	Ind	Ind-Lab	Ind-Lib	Ind-Con	Other	Total
Addington	Con	Con	7,146	50.82%	230	1.64%	84.43%	6,916	7,146	–	–	–	–	–	–	–	–	–	–	14,062
Algoma—Manitoulin	Lib	Lib	7,092	50.94%	576	4.14%	74.61%	7,092	6,516	–	–	–	–	313	–	–	–	–	–	13,921
Brant	L-P	Lib	9,115	74.93%	6,065	49.86%	63.52%	9,115	3,050	–	–	–	–	–	–	–	–	–	–	12,165
Brantford	Ind	I-Lib	8,094	53.71%	2,602	17.27%	72.24%	–	5,492	1,483	–	–	–	–	–	–	8,094	–	–	15,069
Bruce	Lib	Lib	8,739	56.36%	1,972	12.72%	73.02%	8,739	6,767	–	–	–	–	–	–	–	–	–	–	15,506
Carleton	Con	Con	6,956	58.41%	3,262	27.39%	66.76%	3,694	6,956	–	–	–	–	–	–	–	1,258	–	–	11,908
Cochrane North	Lib	Lib	4,940	52.55%	480	5.11%	72.74%	4,940	4,460	–	–	–	–	–	–	–	–	–	–	9,400
Cochrane South	Lib	Lib	12,773	48.55%	5,709	21.70%	73.29%	12,773	7,064	–	–	–	–	6,473	–	–	–	–	–	26,310
Dufferin—Simcoe	Lib	Con	8,484	53.22%	1,027	6.44%	73.46%	7,457	8,484	–	–	–	–	–	–	–	–	–	–	15,941
Durham	Lib	Lib	7,183	52.23%	614	4.46%	79.19%	7,183	6,569	–	–	–	–	–	–	–	–	–	–	13,752
Elgin	Lib	Lib	12,361	62.53%	5,308	26.85%	78.08%	12,361	7,053	355	–	–	–	–	–	–	–	–	–	19,769
Essex North	Lib	Lib	7,449	51.85%	2,455	17.09%	73.71%	7,449	4,994	598	–	–	–	1,326	–	–	–	–	–	14,367
Essex South	Lib	Lib	7,755	63.51%	3,300	27.03%	64.95%	7,755	4,455	–	–	–	–	–	–	–	–	–	–	12,210
Fort William	Lib	Con	5,731	39.93%	495	3.45%	79.73%	5,236	5,731	1,542	–	–	–	–	–	–	1,845	–	–	14,354
Glengarry	Lib	Lib	6,737	67.20%	3,449	34.40%	72.00%	6,737	3,288	–	–	–	–	–	–	–	–	–	–	10,025
Grenville—Dundas	Con	Con	9,288	54.99%	1,685	9.98%	74.84%	7,603	9,288	–	–	–	–	–	–	–	–	–	–	16,891
Grey North	L-P	L-P	8,511	54.21%	2,339	14.90%	77.28%	–	6,172	1,016	8,511	–	–	–	–	–	–	–	–	15,699
Grey South	UFO	UFO	7,296	54.95%	1,314	9.90%	71.83%	–	5,982	–	–	7,296	–	–	–	–	–	–	–	13,278
Haldimand—Norfolk	Lib	Lib	12,638	56.44%	2,883	12.87%	76.53%	12,638	9,755	–	–	–	–	–	–	–	–	–	–	22,393
Halton	L-P	L-P	7,832	55.50%	1,874	13.28%	75.80%	–	5,958	238	7,832	–	–	–	83	–	–	–	–	14,111
Hamilton East	CCF	Lib	9,796	47.31%	3,859	18.64%	71.07%	9,796	5,937	4,858	–	–	–	–	–	–	–	–	116	20,707
Hamilton Centre	Lib	Lib	11,959	54.97%	5,839	26.84%	68.33%	11,959	6,120	–	–	–	–	–	–	–	–	–	3,676	21,755
Hamilton—Wentworth	Lib	Lib	11,559	60.83%	5,550	29.21%	73.01%	11,559	6,009	1,434	–	–	–	–	–	–	–	–	–	19,002
Hastings East	Con	Con	7,052	55.88%	1,484	11.76%	84.08%	5,568	7,052	–	–	–	–	–	–	–	–	–	–	12,620
Hastings West	Lib	Con	9,923	53.56%	1,319	7.12%	76.36%	8,604	9,923	–	–	–	–	–	–	–	–	–	–	18,527
Huron	Lib	Lib	7,042	50.86%	1,180	8.52%	76.42%	7,042	5,862	–	–	–	–	–	942	–	–	–	–	13,846
Huron—Bruce	Lib	Lib	8,587	61.08%	3,807	27.08%	74.03%	8,587	4,780	–	–	–	–	–	–	–	470	222	–	14,059
Kenora	L-L	Lib	6,597	59.27%	2,064	18.54%	67.40%	6,597	4,533	–	–	–	–	–	–	–	–	–	–	11,130
Kent East	L-P	L-P	8,250	71.45%	4,953	42.89%	71.04%	–	3,297	–	8,250	–	–	–	–	–	–	–	–	11,547
Kent West	Lib	Lib	10,991	77.72%	7,840	55.44%	55.16%	10,991	3,151	–	–	–	–	–	–	–	–	–	–	14,142
Kingston	Con	Con	8,014	50.59%	187	1.18%	82.28%	7,827	8,014	–	–	–	–	–	–	–	–	–	–	15,841
Lambton East	Lib	Lib	8,598	63.57%	3,670	27.13%	74.79%	8,598	4,928	–	–	–	–	–	–	–	–	–	–	13,526
Lambton West	Lib	Lib	8,341	61.28%	3,070	22.55%	75.29%	8,341	5,271	–	–	–	–	–	–	–	–	–	–	13,612
Lanark	Con	Con	9,103	54.37%	1,462	8.73%	74.22%	7,641	9,103	–	–	–	–	–	–	–	–	–	–	16,744
Leeds	Lib	Con	10,339	51.85%	736	3.69%	79.42%	9,603	10,339	–	–	–	–	–	–	–	–	–	–	19,942
Lincoln	Lib	Lib	12,547	48.40%	1,146	4.42%	72.76%	12,547	11,401	1,975	–	–	–	–	–	–	–	–	–	25,923
London	Lib	Lib	16,144	55.19%	5,287	18.07%	71.01%	16,144	10,857	2,124	–	–	–	–	–	–	–	–	129	29,254
Middlesex North	Lib	Lib	8,476	59.90%	2,801	19.79%	73.29%	8,476	5,675	–	–	–	–	–	–	–	–	–	–	14,151
Middlesex South	Lib	Lib	8,370	67.22%	4,289	34.45%	67.04%	8,370	4,081	–	–	–	–	–	–	–	–	–	–	12,451
Muskoka—Ontario	L-P	Lib	9,720	52.09%	781	4.19%	77.63%	9,720	8,939	–	–	–	–	–	–	–	–	–	–	18,659
Niagara Falls	Lib	Lib	10,225	60.39%	5,085	30.03%	68.83%	10,225	5,140	710	–	–	–	857	–	–	–	–	–	16,932
Nipissing	Lib	Lib	8,669	49.46%	2,140	12.21%	73.16%	8,669	6,529	–	–	–	–	–	209	–	2,121	–	–	17,528
Northumberland	Lib	Lib	8,873	51.83%	625	3.65%	82.55%	8,873	8,248	–	–	–	–	–	–	–	–	–	–	17,121
Ontario	Lib	Lib	9,834	44.13%	2,059	9.24%	77.73%	9,834	7,775	4,598	–	–	–	–	–	–	–	–	79	22,286
Ottawa East	Lib	Lib	16,920	79.65%	13,134	61.82%	67.75%	16,920	3,786	–	–	–	–	–	–	–	–	–	538	21,244
Ottawa South	Con	Con	17,443	50.20%	893	2.57%	69.41%	16,550	17,443	–	–	–	69	–	–	–	–	–	684	34,746
Oxford	Lib	Lib	11,812	53.84%	2,712	12.36%	74.87%	11,812	9,100	–	–	–	–	–	1,029	–	–	–	–	21,941
Parry Sound	Lib	Lib	6,168	53.46%	799	6.93%	75.43%	6,168	5,369	–	–	–	–	–	–	–	–	–	–	11,537
Peel	Lib	Con	8,228	48.88%	279	1.66%	78.68%	7,949	8,228	657	–	–	–	–	–	–	–	–	–	16,834
Perth	Lib	Lib	15,547	59.80%	5,097	19.61%	75.80%	15,547	10,450	–	–	–	–	–	–	–	–	–	–	25,997
Peterborough	Con	Lib	10,603	48.30%	1,102	5.02%	80.18%	10,603	9,501	1,849	–	–	–	–	–	–	–	–	–	21,953
Port Arthur	Lib	Lib	8,006	56.34%	3,066	21.58%	73.92%	8,006	4,940	1,263	–	–	–	–	–	–	–	–	–	14,209
Prescott	Lib	Lib	6,357	53.91%	1,788	15.16%	70.53%	6,357	865	–	–	–	–	–	–	–	4,569	–	–	11,791
Prince Edward—Lennox	Lib	Con	7,470	50.69%	202	1.37%	77.80%	7,268	7,470	–	–	–	–	–	–	–	0	–	–	14,738
Rainy River	Lib	Lib	3,460	50.45%	1,318	19.22%	73.47%	3,460	2,142	1,256	–	–	–	–	–	–	0	–	–	6,858
Renfrew North	Lib	Lib	6,219	51.16%	282	2.32%	76.19%	6,219	5,937	–	–	–	–	–	–	–	0	–	–	12,156
Renfrew South	Lib	Lib	5,887	47.27%	1,090	8.75%	75.82%	5,887	4,797	–	–	–	–	–	–	–	1,769	–	–	12,453
Russell	Lib	Lib	6,481	58.65%	3,415	30.90%	67.89%	6,481	3,066	–	–	–	–	–	1,504	–	–	–	–	11,051
Sault Ste. Marie	Lib	Lib	7,134	49.47%	646	4.48%	77.42%	7,134	6,488	798	–	–	–	–	–	–	–	–	–	14,420
Simcoe Centre	Lib	Lib	8,375	54.19%	1,294	8.37%	77.08%	8,375	7,081	–	–	–	–	–	–	–	–	–	–	15,456
Simcoe East	Lib	Con	7,606	50.34%	103	0.68%	71.31%	7,503	7,606	–	–	–	–	–	–	–	–	–	–	15,109
Stormont	Lib	Lib	10,409	64.33%	4,638	28.67%	71.94%	10,409	5,771	–	–	–	–	–	–	–	–	–	–	16,180
Sudbury	Lib	Lib	12,850	55.59%	5,470	23.66%	70.21%	12,850	7,380	–	–	–	2,236	–	–	–	650	–	–	23,116
Temiskaming	Lib	Lib	5,966	46.70%	210	1.64%	71.11%	5,966	5,756	1,053	–	–	–	–	–	–	–	–	–	12,775
Victoria	Lib	Con	9,372	50.92%	339	1.84%	82.42%	9,033	9,372	–	–	–	–	–	–	–	–	–	–	18,405
Waterloo North	Lib	Lib	13,466	62.64%	9,302	43.27%	62.02%	13,466	3,322	493	–	–	–	4,164	–	–	–	–	53	21,498
Waterloo South	Lib	Lib	9,064	53.63%	3,367	19.92%	71.69%	9,064	5,697	2,140	–	–	–	–	–	–	–	–	–	16,901
Welland	Lib	Lib	9,994	53.78%	2,946	15.85%	73.93%	9,994	7,048	–	–	–	–	1,542	–	–	–	–	–	18,584
Wellington North	Lib	Lib	8,704	55.19%	1,636	10.37%	75.62%	8,704	7,068	–	–	–	–	–	–	–	–	–	–	15,772
Wellington South	Lib	Lib	8,897	54.69%	2,091	12.85%	78.59%	8,897	–	566	–	–	–	–	–	–	–	6,806	–	16,269
Wentworth	Lib	Lib	10,068	54.08%	4,348	23.36%	69.59%	10,068	5,720	2,480	–	–	–	–	–	–	–	–	348	18,616
Windsor—Walkerville	Lib	Lib	10,090	58.02%	4,057	23.33%	71.88%	10,090	6,033	1,269	–	–	–	–	–	–	–	–	–	17,392
Windsor—Sandwich	Lib	Lib	9,155	61.79%	5,694	38.43%	61.08%	9,155	3,461	2,063	–	–	138	–	–	–	–	–	–	14,817
York East	Con	Con	11,260	39.43%	209	0.73%	63.90%	11,051	11,260	6,008	–	–	–	–	235	–	–	–	–	28,554
York North	Lib	Lib	10,867	53.11%	2,680	13.10%	71.89%	10,867	8,187	1,058	–	–	–	–	–	–	–	–	350	20,462
York South	Con	Con	10,348	38.20%	904	3.34%	66.95%	9,444	10,348	6,985	–	–	–	–	37	–	–	273	–	27,087
York West	Lib	Lib	11,607	44.55%	1,200	4.61%	57.90%	11,607	10,407	2,622	–	–	1,307	–	–	–	–	–	110	26,053
Beaches	Con	Con	7,915	42.29%	725	3.87%	68.09%	7,190	7,915	3,611	–	–	–	–	–	–	–	–	–	18,716
Bellwoods	Lib	Lib	11,772	68.72%	6,712	39.18%	65.34%	11,772	5,060	–	–	–	–	–	–	–	–	–	298	17,130
Bracondale	Con	Lib	7,558	44.24%	29	0.17%	69.41%	7,558	7,529	1,997	–	–	–	–	–	–	–	–	–	17,084
Dovercourt	Con	Con	10,396	47.47%	2,003	9.15%	63.24%	8,393	10,396	2,668	159	–	284	–	–	–	–	–	–	21,900
Eglinton	Lib	Lib	14,809	48.75%	1,104	3.63%	71.07%	14,809	13,705	1,861	–	–	–	–	–	–	–	–	–	30,375
High Park	Con	Con	9,443	46.95%	2,152	10.70%	64.43%	7,291	9,443	3,380	–	–	–	–	–	–	–	–	–	20,114
Parkdale	Con	Con	10,583	44.39%	127	0.53%	64.01%	10,456	10,583	2,802	–	–	–	–	–	–	–	–	–	23,841
Riverdale	Lib	Con	11,082	46.23%	2,761	11.52%	66.19%	8,321	11,082	4,477	–	–	–	–	–	94	–	–	–	23,974
St. Andrew	Lib	Lib	6,434	36.80%	151	0.86%	71.31%	6,434	3,888	878	–	–	6,283	–	–	–	–	–	–	17,483
St. David	Con	Lib	7,703	43.18%	839	4.70%	67.02%	7,703	6,864	2,315	–	–	–	–	–	–	–	850	107	17,839
St. George	Lib	Lib	10,071	49.81%	1,414	6.99%	62.63%	10,071	8,657	–	–	–	1,490	–	–	–	–	–	–	20,218
St. Patrick	Lib	Lib	6,161	48.45%	672	5.28%	64.58%	6,161	5,489	947	–	–	–	–	–	–	–	119	–	12,716
Woodbine	Con	Con	9,756	43.68%	2,331	10.44%	63.26%	7,425	9,756	5,152	–	–	–	–	–	–	–	–	–	22,333

= open seat
= turnout is above provincial average
= winning candidate was in previous Legislature
= incumbent switched allegiance for the election
= incumbency arose from byelection gain
= other incumbents renominated
= previously an MP in the House of Commons of Canada
= multiple candidates
= campaigned as CCF-Labour candidates

=== Analysis ===
Party candidates in 2nd place
Party in 1st place	Party in 2nd place						Total
Party in 1st place	Lib	Con	Lab	F-Lab	I-Lib	I-Con	Total
Liberal		58	1	1	1	1	62
Conservative	23						23
Liberal–Progressive		3					3
United Farmers		1					1
Independent Liberal		1					1
Total	23	63	1	1	1	1	90

Candidates ranked 1st to 5th place, by party
Parties	1st	2nd	3rd	4th	5th	Total
█ Liberal	62	23				85
█ Conservative	23	63	3			89
█ Liberal–Progressive	3				1	4
█ Independent Liberal	1	1	5	1		8
█ United Farmers	1					1
█ Farmer–Labour		1	5			6
█ Labour		1	2	3	1	7
█ Independent Conservative		1		4		5
█ Co-operative Commonwealth			32	5		37
█ Independent			3	3	1	7
█ CCF-Labour			2			2
█ Socialist Labor			1	7	3	11
█ Communist			1			1
█ Labor–Progressive			1			1
█ Social Credit			1			1
█ Independent Labour				1		1

=== Seats that changed hands ===
Elections to the 20th Parliament of Ontario – seats won/lost by party, 1934–1937
Party	1934	Gain from (loss to)																1937
Party	1934	Lib		Con		L-Pro		I-Lib		UFO		CCF		L-L		Ind		1937
Liberal	64			3	(9)	2						1		1				62
Conservative	17	9	(3)															23
Liberal–Progressive	5		(2)															3
Independent-Liberal	–															1		1
United Farmers	1																	1
Co-operative Commonwealth	1		(1)															–
Liberal–Labour	1		(1)															–
Independent	1								(1)									–
Total	90	9	(7)	3	(9)	2	–	–	(1)	–	–	1	–	1	–	1	–	90

There were 17 seats that changed allegiance in the election.

Liberal to Conservative

- Dufferin—Simcoe
- Fort William
- Hastings West
- Leeds
- Peel
- Prince Edward—Lennox
- Riverdale
- Simcoe East
- Victoria

Conservative to Liberal

- Bracondale
- Peterborough
- St. David

Liberal-Progressive to Liberal

- Brant
- Muskoka—Ontario

CCF to Liberal

- Hamilton East

Liberal-Labour to Liberal

- Kenora

Independent to Independent-Liberal

- Brantford

Resulting composition of the 20th Legislative Assembly of Ontario
Source		Party					
Source		Lib	Cons	Lib-Pr	UFO	I-Lib	Total
Seats retained	Incumbents returned	42	11	3	1		57
Seats retained	Open seats held	13	3				16
Seats changing hands	Incumbents defeated	4	9				13
Seats changing hands	Byelection gain held	1					1
Seats changing hands	Incumbent changed allegiance	2				1	3
Total		62	23	3	1	1	90

== See also ==
- Politics of Ontario
- List of Ontario political parties
- Premier of Ontario
- Leader of the Opposition (Ontario)
