= 1944 Hamilton, Ontario, municipal election =

1944 Hamilton municipal election
- December 4, 1944
Candidate	Samuel Lawrence
Party	Co-operative Commonwealth
Popular vote	Acclaimed
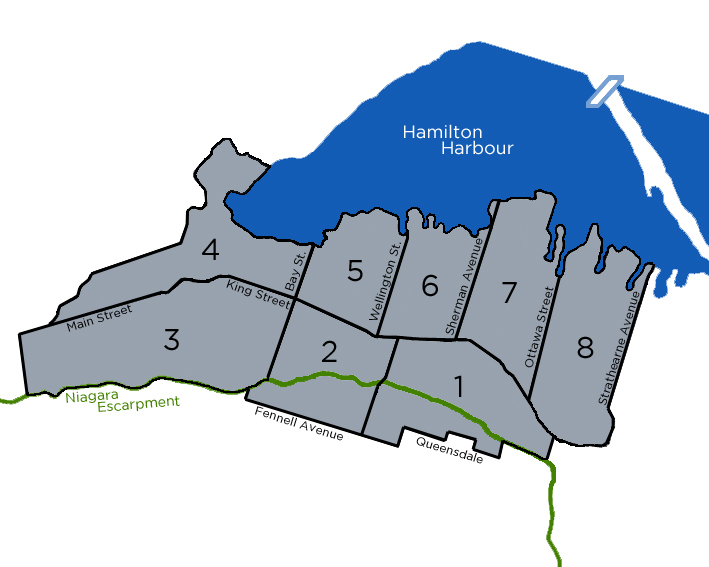
- Each of Hamilton's eight wards. Electors would send two Alderman per ward to City Hall in addition to four Controllers and one Mayor elected at-large.
Mayor before election
Samuel Lawrence
Co-operative Commonwealth Federation
Elected mayor
Samuel Lawrence
Co-operative Commonwealth Federation

The 1944 Hamilton municipal election was held on December 4, 1944 to select one Mayor, four Controllers, and sixteen members of the Hamilton, Ontario City Council. Voters also elected one member per-ward to the local Public School Board for a two-year term.

== Mayoral election ==
After enjoying a term free from major controversies, incumbent mayor Sam Lawrence was believed to receive a second term by acclamation. The Hamilton Spectator, one of Lawrence's chief opponents during his candidacy the year prior, noted that Lawrence's acclamation was virtually a guarantee as many civic politicians were focused on two 'money' bylaws that would be put to the voters in the form of referendums. Lawrence was the sole candidate for the office on nomination day and spoke briefly about his plans for the coming year, specifically implementing a planned economic program to ensure the city's financial stability by 1945.

Summary of the December 4, 1944 Hamilton, Ontario Mayoral Election
Candidate	Affiliation	Popular vote		
Candidate	Affiliation	#	%	±%
Samuel Lawrence (incumbent)	CCF-Labour	Acclaimed		
Total votes		n/a	n/a	n/a
Registered voters		93,374	100%	
Note: Candidate campaign colours are based on their supporting party's or group's colour.
Sources: "Mayor Samuel Lawrence Elected For Second Term", Hamilton Spectator, News, Friday, November 24, 1944, pp. 7.

== Board of Control election ==
Summary of the December 4, 1944 Hamilton, Ontario Board of Control Election
Candidate	Affiliation	Popular vote	
Candidate	Affiliation	%	Rank
Nora-Frances Henderson (incumbent)	Women's Civic Club	20,005	1
William Alfred Weir (incumbent)	Independent Conservative	16,536	2
Donald Clarke	Independent Conservative	15,487	3
Hugh McDermid McIntyre (incumbent)	Independent	14,013	4
Walter Chadwick (incumbent)	Independent	13,608	5
Harry Hunter	Labor-Progressive	12,226	6
Total votes		n/a	
Registered voters		93,374	
Note: Candidate campaign colours are based on their supporting party's or group's colour. Note: Voters could select up to 4 candidates for the office of Controller.
Sources: "Donald Clarke Regains Seat, Displacing Walter Chadwick", Hamilton Spectator, Tuesday, December 5, 1944, pg. 11.

== Aldermanic elections ==
=== Ward One (Delta-Blakely-Escarpment East) ===
The elections in Ward One saw the return of former alderman Samuel Leslie Parker after a year away from council following his defeat in the Board of Control elections the year prior. During the 1943-1944 term of office, incumbent alderman William MacFarland died suddenly, prompting council to appoint Frederick Slack, the runner-up in the previous year's election, to MacFarland's seat. Slack campaigned heavily on his incumbency and referred to himself as a "people's candidate" during the campaign. Despite his brief tenure in office, Slack was soundly defeated, with electors returning Parker and his fellow alderman Herbert Hannah to office.

One of the area's prominent organizers with the Liberal Party, Henry Arnott Hicks, made his first bid for public office in this election. The 37-year-old Hicks was ultimately unsuccessful, falling over 700 votes behind Hannah. Despite his close ties with the Liberals, Hicks campaigned as an independent. The central theme of his campaign literature, aimed at his CCF opponent, declared that "civic affairs should be free of politics."

The local CCF, attempting to boost their ranks on council to support Lawrence, nominated Bessie Mitchell to stand as their candidate in the ward. Campaigning on a platform of social justice and governmental efficiency, Mitchell appealed to Hamilton's women by pressing them to "make sure that women of Hamilton have representation!" Mitchell's candidacy was not covered by the Hamilton Spectator and the paper mistakenly referred to her as 'Mr. Mitchell' when reporting on the results the day after the election.

Summary of the December 4, 1944 Hamilton, Ontario Ward One Alderman Election
Candidate	Affiliation	Popular vote		
Candidate	Affiliation	#	%	±%
Samuel Parker	Independent	2,722	n/a	n/a
Herbert Hannah (Incumbent)	Independent	2,553	n/a	n/a
Henry Arnott Hicks	Independent Liberal	1,846	n/a	n/a
Bessie Mitchell	CCF-Labour	1,474	n/a	n/a
Frederick Slack (Incumbent)	Independent	1,097	n/a	n/a
Total votes		n/a	n/a	n/a
Registered voters		n/a	100%	
Note 1: Candidate campaign colours are based on their supporting party's or group's colour. Note 2: Each Ward elected two aldermen to represent them at City Council.
Sources: "Aldermen", Hamilton Spectator, Tuesday, December 5, 1944, pg. 11.

=== Ward Two (Corktown-Stinson-Escarpment West) ===
The aldermanic race in Ward Two pit sitting alderman Hugh Brown and Robert Elliot against former alderman William Warrender, who had returned to the city after active duty with the RCAF. Warrender, a fierce anti-Communist and opponent of the CCF, campaigned with support from the local Progressive Conservative establishment and succeeded in making military service a central theme of the campaign. Brown responded to Warrender by reminding voters of his military service during World War I in his political advertisements.

The local CCF candidate, Arthur Cole, did little campaigning in local media and was not considered likely to win the seat from either of the two incumbents.

Summary of the December 4, 1944 Hamilton, Ontario Ward Two Alderman Election
Candidate	Affiliation	Popular vote		
Candidate	Affiliation	#	%	±%
Hugh Brown (Incumbent)	Independent	1,997	n/a	n/a
Robert Elliott (Incumbent)	Independent	1,870	n/a	n/a
William Warrender	Independent Conservative	1,709	n/a	n/a
Arthur Cole	CCF-Labour	949	n/a	n/a
Total votes		n/a	n/a	n/a
Registered voters		n/a	100%	
Note 1: Candidate campaign colours are based on their supporting party's or group's colour. Note 2: Each Ward elected two aldermen to represent them at City Council.
Sources: "Aldermen", Hamilton Spectator, Tuesday, December 5, 1944, pg. 11.

=== Ward Three (Durand-Kirkendall-Ainslie Wood) ===
Summary of the December 4, 1944 Hamilton, Ontario Ward Three Alderman Election
Candidate	Affiliation	Popular vote		
Candidate	Affiliation	#	%	±%
Herbert Smye (Incumbent)	Independent Conservative	Acclaimed		
Vernon Knowles (Incumbent)	Independent Conservative	Acclaimed		
Total votes		n/a	n/a	n/a
Registered voters		n/a	100%	
Note 1: Candidate campaign colours are based on their supporting party's or group's colour. Note 2: Each Ward elected two aldermen to represent them at City Council.
Sources: "Aldermen", Hamilton Spectator, Tuesday, December 5, 1944, pg. 11.

=== Ward Four (Westdale-Strathcona) ===
Ward Four in the city's north-west, featured a battle between two prominent members of Hamilton's Liberal establishment and three diverse challengers. Aldermen Peter McCulloch, who was first elected in 1935, and two-term alderman Thomas Marshall fended off challenges from independent candidate Arthur Vickers and two distinct labour candidates. Running as an independent labour candidate, Al Campbell campaigned on a platform of replacing the city's slums with affordable housing. The CCF candidate, Frank Malloy, campaigned on his trade union credentials and his past service in World War I. On election night, McCulloch and Marshall won by considerable margins over their challengers.

Summary of the December 4, 1944 Hamilton, Ontario Ward Four Alderman Election
Candidate	Affiliation	Popular vote		
Candidate	Affiliation	#	%	±%
Peter McCulloch (Incumbent)	Independent Liberal	2,158	n/a	n/a
Thomas Marshall (Incumbent)	Independent Liberal	1,568	n/a	n/a
Arthur Vickers	Independent	901	n/a	n/a
Al Campbell	Independent Labour	667	n/a	n/a
Frank Malloy	CCF-Labour	559	n/a	n/a
Total votes		n/a	n/a	n/a
Registered voters		n/a	100%	
Note 1: Candidate campaign colours are based on their supporting party's or group's colour. Note 2: Each Ward elected two aldermen to represent them at City Council.
Sources: "Aldermen", Hamilton Spectator, Tuesday, December 5, 1944, pg. 11.

=== Ward Five (Beasley-Jamestowne) ===
Summary of the December 4, 1944 Hamilton, Ontario Ward Five Alderman Election
Candidate	Affiliation	Popular vote		
Candidate	Affiliation	#	%	±%
Douglas Gordon (Incumbent)	Independent	1,816	n/a	n/a
Frank Dillon (Incumbent)	Independent Liberal	1,791	n/a	n/a
John Dowling	CCF-Labour	1,437	n/a	n/a
Total votes		n/a	n/a	n/a
Registered voters		n/a	100%	
Note 1: Candidate campaign colours are based on their supporting party's or group's colour. Note 2: Each Ward elected two aldermen to represent them at City Council.
Sources: "Aldermen", Hamilton Spectator, Tuesday, December 5, 1944, pg. 11.

=== Ward Six (Landsdale-Gibson) ===
The race in Ward Six was a contest between two long-term alderman and two candidates who campaigned on their labour credentials. Alderman John Hodgson, a member of the local Progressive Conservative establishment, had served on council since 1934. His ward-mate, Malcolm Heddle, had held the second Ward Six seat on council since 1942.

The independent labour candidate, Alfred Stratford, campaigned under the slogan "A Labour Man For a Labour Ward!" and advocated for job security, slum clearance, and affordable housing for Hamiltonians. Frank Reeves, the CCF candidate, campaigned on a ticket with Ward Six trustee candidate Bob Tilbury.

In their post-election commentary, the Hamilton Spectator noted that Reeves and Stratford "were never in the picture."

Summary of the December 4, 1944 Hamilton, Ontario Ward Six Alderman Election
Candidate	Affiliation	Popular vote		
Candidate	Affiliation	#	%	±%
John Hodgson (Incumbent)	Independent Conservative	2,390	n/a	n/a
Malcolm Heddle (Incumbent)	Independent	2,381	n/a	n/a
Frank Reeves	CCF-Labour	1,413	n/a	n/a
Alfred Stratford	Independent Labour	1,012	n/a	n/a
Total votes		n/a	n/a	n/a
Registered voters		n/a	100%	
Note 1: Candidate campaign colours are based on their supporting party's or group's colour. Note 2: Each Ward elected two aldermen to represent them at City Council.
Sources: "Aldermen", Hamilton Spectator, Tuesday, December 5, 1944, pg. 11.

=== Ward Seven (Stipley) ===
One of the most closely watched races of the 1944 election was the aldermanic battle in Ward Seven. One-term incumbent alderman Harry Hunter of the Labor-Progressive Party had announced his intention to seek election to the Board of Control, leaving an open contest for the ward's second seat. The other seat was contested by incumbent Frederick Hayward, who sought reelection on an independent platform.

The city's LPP organization determined that best candidate to succeed Hunter on the party's ticket was Helen Anderson who placed second in the previous year's school board trustee race in the ward. Anderson campaigned as the natural successor to Hunter, even using the phrase "For continued labour representation in Ward 7" on her election advertisements.

Attempting a comeback in the ward was Sam Clarke, who had lost election the year prior by 50 votes. Clarke, believing his affiliation with the CCF-Labour slate was the reason for his defeat, publicly distanced himself from the party. In his election advertisements, Clarke went so far as to label himself a "Strictly Independent Candidate" to avoid any further associations between himself and the mayor's political slate. Clarke's 1944 campaign called for an increase in old-age pensions to $40 per-person, supports for affordable housing, and abolishing level crossings.

The CFF candidate was M. T. Montgomery, a local trade unionist. Montgomery's candidacy was not reported on by the Spectator, nor did they mention his name in their summary of the elections.

On election night, the ward was the closest, with Anderson and Clarke jockeying for support during the counting process. By the end of the night, Anderson had surpassed Clarke by 23 votes and the latter conceded defeat.

Summary of the December 4, 1944 Hamilton, Ontario Ward Seven Alderman Election
Affiliation	Candidate	Results	
Affiliation	Candidate	#	Elected?
Independent	Frederick Hayward (incumbent)	1,917	✓
Labour Progressive	Helen Anderson	1,628	✓
Independent	Sam Clarke	1,605	
CCF	M.T. Montgomery	1,196	
Note 1: Candidate campaign colours are based on their supporting party's or group's colour. Note 2: Each Ward elected two aldermen to represent them at City Council.
Sources: "Aldermen", Hamilton Spectator, Tuesday, December 5, 1944, pg. 11.

=== Ward Eight (Homeside-Bartonville) ===
Summary of the December 4, 1944 Hamilton, Ontario Ward Eight Alderman Election
Candidate	Affiliation	Popular vote		
Candidate	Affiliation	#	%	±%
James Newell (Incumbent)	CCF-Labour	2,714	n/a	n/a
Joseph Easton (Incumbent)	CCF-Labour	2,664	n/a	n/a
Ward Fawcett	Independent	1,811	n/a	n/a
Bernard Thompson	Independent	1,694	n/a	n/a
Total votes		n/a	n/a	n/a
Registered voters		n/a	100%	
Note 1: Candidate campaign colours are based on their supporting party's or group's colour. Note 2: Each Ward elected two aldermen to represent them at City Council.
Sources: "Aldermen", Hamilton Spectator, Tuesday, December 5, 1944, pg. 11.
