= Bill Warrender =

Canadian politician

William Kenneth Warrender

MPP for Hamilton Centre
- In office November 22, 1951 – November 21, 1962
- Preceded by: Robert Desmond Thornberry, CCF
- Succeeded by: Ada Mary Pritchard, PC

Controller on the City of Hamilton Board of Control
- In office December 1, 1949 – November 21, 1951
- Preceded by: Walter Chadwick, Women's Civic Club
- Succeeded by: Samuel Baggs, Independent Conservative

Alderman for Ward Two, City of Hamilton
- In office December 1, 1945 – November 31, 1949
- Preceded by: Robert Elliot, Independent
- Succeeded by: Charles McCabe, Independent

Alderman for Ward Two, City of Hamilton
- In office December 1, 1940 – November 31, 1942
- Preceded by: James Phin, Independent
- Succeeded by: Robert Elliot, Independent

Personal details
- Born: August 5, 1908 Stoney Creek, Ontario
- Died: April 6, 1997 (aged 88) Hamilton, Ontario
- Party: Progressive Conservative
- Occupation: Lawyer, Judge

William Kenneth Warrender (August 5, 1908 – April 6, 1997) was a Canadian politician, who represented Hamilton Centre in the Legislative Assembly of Ontario from 1951 to 1962 as a Progressive Conservative member. Prior to his service in the Legislature, Warrender was a lawyer and civic politician in Hamilton.

== Early life and political career ==
Warrender was born in Stoney Creek, Ontario in 1908. He attended the Hamilton Collegiate Institute, followed by post-secondary studies at both McMaster University and Osgoode Law School. Practicing as a lawyer in Hamilton, Warrender's first foray into politics saw him elected to Hamilton, Ontario City Council in 1940 as an alderman for Ward Two. He served in this position for two terms until the beginning of the Second World War.

After the beginning of hostilities, Warrender joined the Royal Canadian Air Force where he served as a Flight Lieutenant. Following his return from Europe, Warrender attempted a political comeback, but was defeated in Hamilton's 1944 municipal election. After winning an acclamation to City Council in 1945, Warrender served four terms as Ward Two's alderman before being elected to Hamilton's Board of Control in 1949. In 1950, he was re-elected and, after securing the greatest number of votes amongst the four Controllers, also served as the city's Vice-Mayor.

== Provincial offices ==
First elected in the general election in 1951, Warrender was re-elected in the provincial general elections in 1955 and 1959, serving in three majority Progressive Conservative governments under Premiers Leslie Frost and John Robarts.

In his first term, he served on as many as five Standing Committees of the Legislative Assembly simultaneously, until being appointed as the Minister of Planning and Development on January 20, 1953. After his second election, he was appointed as a Minister without Portfolio on August 17, 1955, and he served in that role until November 1, 1956, at which time he was appointed as Minister of Municipal Affairs. He served in that role until November 8, 1961, at which time he became Minister of Labour.

Warrender retired from office on November 21, 1962, at which time he was given the appointment of Provincial Judge. He served as a Small Claims Court and then District Court Judge for 21 years.

== Legacy ==
While serving as an MPP, Warrender was instrumental in the expansion of Mohawk College in Hamilton, and served as the institution's founding chairman. In recognition of his work, Mohawk College awards the "W.K. Warrender Award" annually for distinguished contributions to student affairs.

Warrender was involved in many local institutions following his retirement from politics, such as aiding in the founding of the Royal Botanical Gardens. Additionally, he served on the boards of the Hamilton Automobile Club, the Hamilton Tiger-Cats, the Royal Hamilton Military Institute, and the Presidents' Club at McMaster University.

In recognition of his public service, Warrender was awarded an Honorary Doctor of Laws degree from McMaster University in 1962.

Warrender was a father of two who lived in Hamilton until his death in 1997 at 88 from pneumonia.
