= John Mitchell (Ontario politician) =

Canadian politician and trade union leader

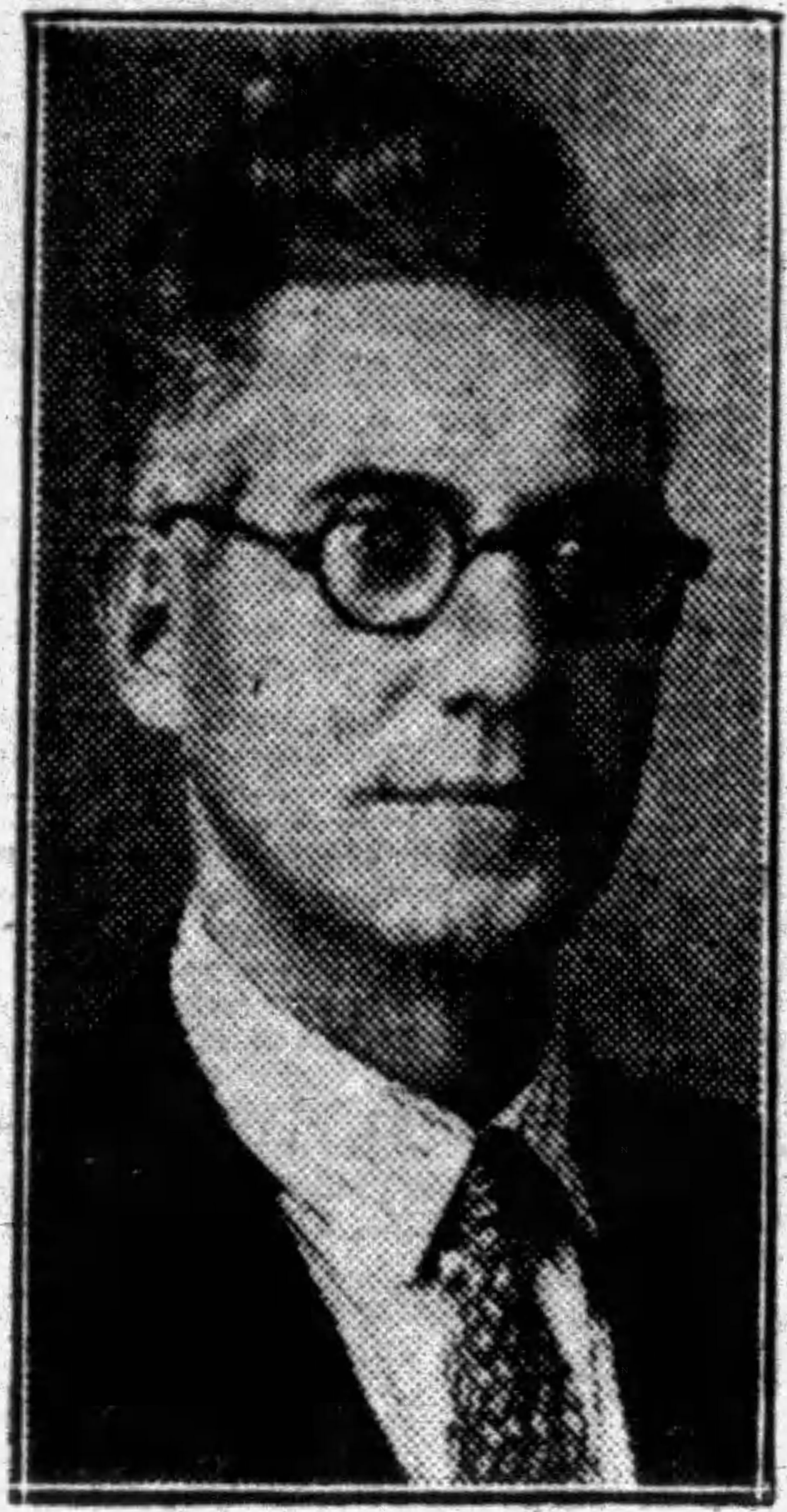
- Cover, Hamilton Spectator, April 13, 1936

Leader of the Ontario CCF de facto while Party President
- In office 1934–1941
- Preceded by: Agnes MacPhail (as CCF Ontario provincial council chair)
- Succeeded by: Ted Jolliffe (as party leader) Samuel Lawrence (as party president)

Personal details
- Born: Scotland
- Died: November 2, 1955 (aged 73) Toronto, Ontario, Canada
- Party: Ontario CCF

John Mitchell (unknown – November 2, 1955) was a trade unionist and politician in Ontario, Canada who served as president of the Ontario Co-operative Commonwealth Federation from 1934 to 1941, and as the de facto party leader during the new party's inaugural election campaigns in 1934 and 1937.

== Early life ==
Mitchell was born in Scotland and moved to Canada for the first time in 1908 to work in the Nova Scotia coal mines. He returned to Scotland after a few years, and returned Canada again in 1929 to work for National Steel Car in Hamilton, Ontario.

== Political career ==
=== Hamilton City Council ===
Mitchell was elected an alderman of Hamilton in the municipal election in December 1931 as an Independent Labour Party (ILP) candidate, joining a growing faction led by Controller Samuel Lawrence. He was reelected in 1932. In the 1933 election, the local branch of the Independent Labour Party opted to join forces with the newly founded Cooperative Commonwealth Federation (CCF) and run candidates on a unified ticket. Mitchell and Lawrence along with four other incumbent Labour aldermen were all re-elected. Despite the cooperation however, the slate were unable to expand their share of seats on council. Following Lawrence's election to the Ontario provincial legislature in the 1934 provincial election and the dissolution of the cooperation agreement between CCF and ILP, Mitchell was soundly defeated in his bid to take Lawrence's place on the Board of Control in the 1934 election.

=== Leader of the Ontario CCF ===
Mitchell was elected the first Ontario CCF president in 1934, succeeding Agnes MacPhail, a veteran MP affiliated with both the Progressive Party and the United Farmers of Ontario (UFO) who has been the de facto head of the CCF Ontario section since the party formation in 1932, but was compelled to resign from the CCF after the UFO withdrew from the party after alleging communist infiltration. The upheaval led to the suspension of the Ontario provincial council by CCF federal leader J. S. Woodsworth. As president, Mitchel was tasked to purge the party of affiliate organizations suspected of having been infiltrated by Communists and suspected Communists from senior party posts, and institute an internal structure with greater centralized control.

Mitchell was a leading campaigner for Humphrey Mitchell’s successful federal bid as a Labour candidate in the 1931 Hamilton East federal by-election, stood in for him in numerous reported campaign events. During that campaign, John Mitchell's radical fervent style coupled with the shared surname with the candidate attracted some controversy when a reporter mistakenly attributed his comment, “If he [Premier George Henry] strains the patience of the working class, will he be able to deal with them by machine guns?” to the candidate Humphrey Mitchell, prompting a prominent correction the day following. Following the election however, Humphrey Mitchell did not get along well with the three other Labour MPs, and refused to join them upon the formation of the CCF in 1932. The bad blood led to the two Mitchells running against each other in the 1935 federal election with John as the official CCF candidate. The vote split led to the Conservative Party regaining the seat despite a further reduced vote share. John came in last in that election with only 16% of the votes. The two Mitchells would cross paths again many times as both became consequential figures in the Canadian labour scene in years to come.

1935 Canadian federal election: Hamilton East
Party	Candidate	Votes
Conservative	Albert A. Brown	10,078
Labour	Humphrey Mitchell	7,288
Reconstruction	Donald A. Clarke	6,197
Co-operative Commonwealth	John Mitchell	4,506

As the president of the Ontario CCF from 1934 to 1941, Mitchell acted as the party's spokesperson and was broadly recognized in the press as party leader during the 1934 and 1937 provincial elections. He embarked on province-wide campaign tours both times. Hailing from the labour tradition of the federation, Mitchell's task to bring the remnant of the Progressive Party, then led by Harry Nixon, and of the UFO, then with Farquhar Oliver as its only remaining member in the legislature, was made even more difficult with the Ontario Liberals having elected the charismatic populist Elgin MP Mitchell Hepburn, a farmer and former UFO organizer, as its leader. Despite capturing 7% of the popular vote in the 1934 election, a vote share exceeding the combined Progressive, UFO, and Labour vote shares in the previous election, CCF under Mitchell's leadership was only able to elect one member, Mitchell's longtime ally Samuel Lawrence in Hamilton East. Mitchel himself contested Wentworth, capturing 31.7% of the votes in a heated three-way contest, the party's best results other than in Hamilton East.

1934 Ontario general election: Wentworth
Party	Candidate	Votes
Liberal	George Bethune	6,272
Conservative	Thomas Mahony	6,153
Co-operative Commonwealth	John Mitchell	5,771

Instead of joining the CCF, both Nixon and Oliver later took the remnant of their parties into the Liberal fold and served in the Hepburn ministry (and each succeeded Hepburn as leaders of the Ontario Liberals some time later). In the 1937 election, CCF saw its vote share receding to 5%, and was unable to preserve its only member. Mitchell himself contested Waterloo South, challenging Liberal Normal Hipel, the incumbent Speaker of the Legislative Assembly, and came in a distant third with just an eighth of the votes.

1937 Ontario general election: Waterloo South
Party	Candidate	Votes
Liberal	Norman Hipel	9,064
Conservative	F Scott	5,697
Co-operative Commonwealth	John Mitchell	2,140

Mitchell contested the 1938 Waterloo South federal by-election, and again came in a distant third behind Conservative victor Karl Homuth, a former Labour turn Conservative MPP, and Galt mayor Kenneth Serviss who ran as a Liberal.

Canadian federal by-election, November 14, 1938: Waterloo South Death of Alexander Edwards
Party	Candidate	Votes	%	±%
Conservative	Karl Homuth	7,776	51.67	+11.52
Liberal	R. Kenneth Serviss	3,730	24.78	-14.63
Co-operative Commonwealth	John Mitchell	3,544	23.55	–
Total valid votes		15,050	100.00	
Conservative hold		Swing		+13.08
Source(s) "Waterloo South, Ontario (1867-1968)". History of Federal Ridings Since 1867. Library of Parliament.

After a tenure remembered mostly for his brash, loud and angry style, Mitchell relinquished the party's presidency in 1941 to his longtime ally, the less radical Samuel Lawrence, who recommended that the party formally elect a leader in 1942.

== Trade union leader ==
Mitchel became head of United Steelworkers of America’s District 6, then with jurisdiction over all of Canada except the Atlantic provinces, in 1940 and served until his retirement in 1953. The role ensured many crossing of paths with his erstwhile ally and adversary Humphrey Mitchell from Hamilton, who joined the Liberal King ministry as labour minister in 1941, and remained as such for nine of John Mitchell's thirteen years as district director. During World War II, he was appointed by the federal Department of Munitions and Supply to the board of directors of Research Enterprises Limited, a short-lived Crown Corporation in Leaside, Ontario (now part of Toronto) that built electronics and optical instruments.
