= Lloyd Douglas Jackson =

Mayor of Hamilton, Ontario
- In office 1950–1962
- Preceded by: Samuel Lawrence
- Succeeded by: Victor Copps

Personal details
- Born: April 22, 1888 Sarnia, Ontario, Canada
- Died: September 11, 1973 (aged 85) Hamilton, Ontario, Canada
- Resting place: Woodland Cemetery
- Spouse: Susan Watson (m. 1913)

Lloyd Douglas Jackson (April 22, 1888 – September 11, 1973) was mayor of Hamilton, Ontario, Canada from 1950 to 1962.

Born near Sarnia, Ontario, Jackson attended McMaster University while it was still in Toronto, earning a bachelor's degree in Chemistry. He began his political career in Hamilton's Board of Education, whereupon he served as Mayor for 13 years. As mayor, he focused on the development of Hamilton's downtown area, including the construction of the new City Hall.

In 1970, a shopping and commercial centre, Lloyd D. Jackson Square (known as Jackson Square), was named in his honour.
