= John Peebles =

Canadian politician

John Peebles (1872 – January 5, 1948) was a Canadian politician. Peebles served as the mayor of Hamilton, Ontario from 1930 to 1933.

Born in Albion Corners, Ontario, Peebles moved to Hamilton as a small child, and eventually established a jewellery business. He was elected as an alderman covering the city at large in 1908. He ran for the Hamilton East seat in the House of Commons in 1911 as a Liberal, but was defeated by incumbent Samuel Barker. He received only 32.6% of the vote.

For several years, he sat on the cemetery board. In 1925, he was again elected, this time as alderman for Ward 3. From 1926 to 1929, he sat on the board of control.

In 1930, he was acclaimed as mayor. He subsequently won re-election three times, until he was defeated in 1934 by Herbert Earl Wilton.
