= Herbert Earl Wilton =

Canadian politician

Herbert Earl Wilton (October 28, 1869 – February 1, 1937) was a Canadian politician.

Born in New Sarum, Ontario, and first employed as a journalist with the Hamilton Spectator and later the Hamilton Herald, Wilton was served as Ward 1 alderman from 1926 to 1928, and then again in 1931. He was defeated for re-election in 1932. In 1933, he defeated incumbent John Peebles.

During his two terms as mayor, he strictly budgeted the city, decreased the debt and lowered taxes.

In 1935, he ran as the Conservative candidate for Member of Parliament for Hamilton West and won, receiving 33.6% of the vote in a five-candidate race. He died in office.

Parliament of Canada
Preceded by Charles William Bell	Member of Parliament for Hamilton West; 1935–1937	Succeeded by John Allmond Marsh
