= Freeman Ferrier Treleaven =

Freeman Ferrier Treleaven, QC (October 8, 1884 – October 30, 1952) was a lawyer and Canadian politician.

Born in London, Ontario, Treleaven graduated the University of Toronto and Osgoode Hall Law School. He subsequently moved to Hamilton, Ontario, where in 1919, he was elected as alderman for Ward 1. He served in this post until he was elected to the Board of Control in 1922. After four years on the Board of Control, he was elected mayor in 1926 and served two one-year terms.
