= Sherman Avenue (Hamilton, Ontario) =

Collector road in the lower portion of Hamilton, Ontario, Canada

Sherman Avenue is a collector road in the lower portion of Hamilton, Ontario, Canada. It begins at the Niagara Escarpment ('The Mountain') just south of Cumberland Avenue and is a one-way street bisecting the industrialized northern neighbourhoods of the city. It ends at Ship Street — the site of Steel Company of Canada (Stelco).

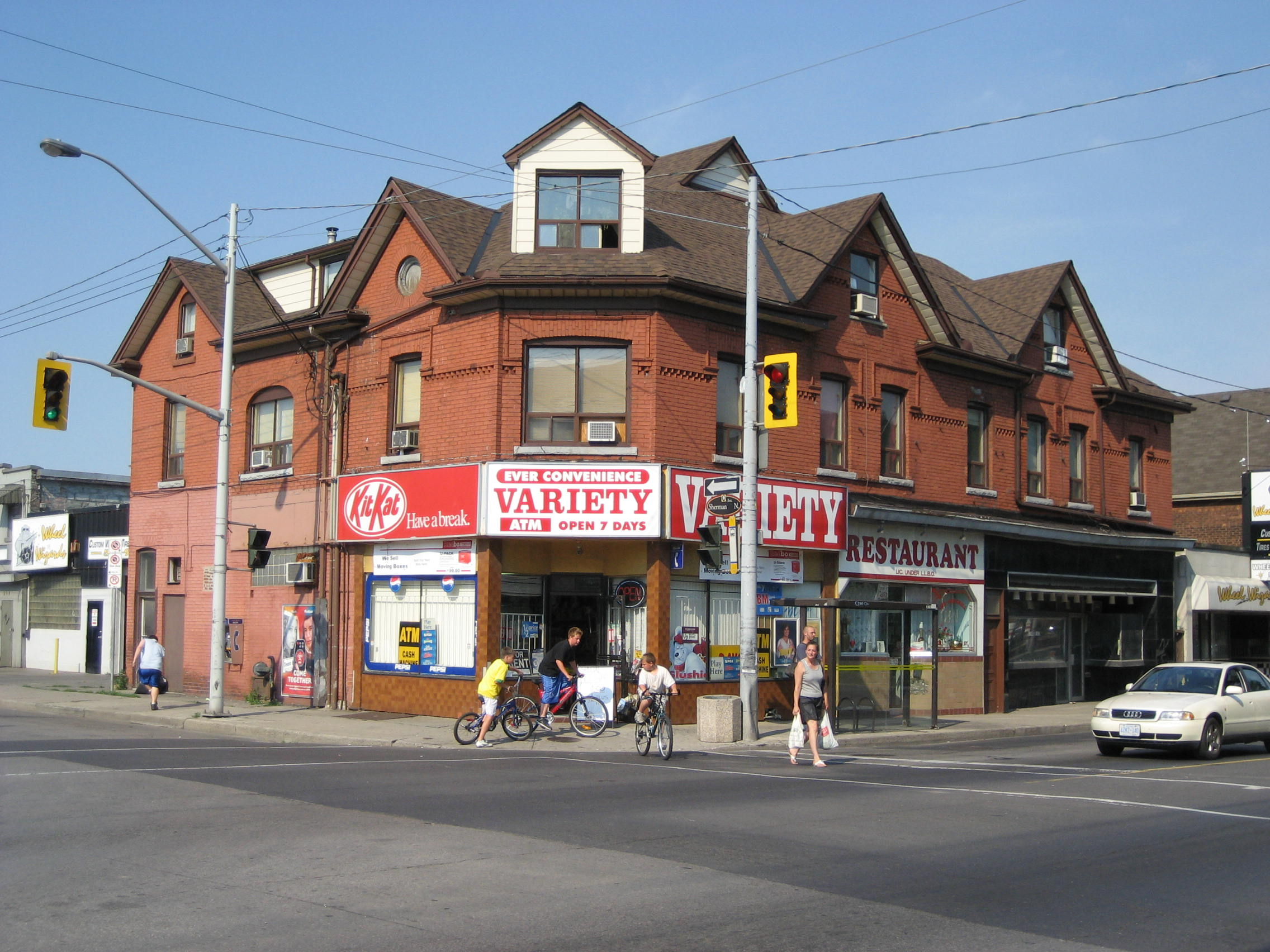
Corner of Sherman Avenue North & Barton Street

Upper Sherman Avenue is located on the top of escarpment, running roughly from North to South, starting from Concession Street to Rymal Road. It does not directly connect with Sherman Avenue below.

The two Shermans are a former sideroad between lots 8 and 9 of the former Barton Township. (Note: From an examination of the historical map of Barton Township)

The Sherman Cut is a rock cut through the brow of the escarpment. Beginning at Crockett Street, it runs downhill and north, parallel to Upper Sherman. It passes under Concession Street and Mountain Park Avenue, coming to an end at a tee-intersection with the Sherman Access. Photos Video. In 2019, the Cut handled 21,392 car trips per day.

The Sherman Access runs diagonally down the slope of the escarpment. From the base of the Sherman Cut, it has two legs. The west leg (originally known as Mountain Boulevard) proceeds downhill, and makes a sharp hairpin turn in the area of the Jolley Cut and the Claremont Access. It ends in a tee intersection with Charlton Avenue East. The east leg proceeds downhill until it intercepts the Kenilworth Access.

The Sherman Access has reversible lanes. It is the only mountain access with time restrictions. The northbound (downhill) is open to traffic for the morning rush; while the southbound (uphill) is open to traffic during the afternoon rush. The rest of the time, it operates as a regular two-lane road.

The Sherman Access was constructed in 1929, passing under the Wentworth Incline Railway. From 1937 to 1956, Highway 55 travelled over portions of Gage Road, Crockett Street, Sherman Cut, and the west leg of the Sherman Access.Map

Due to the continuing erosion of the escarpment, the Access has been closed several times due to rock falls: in 2012 2016 and 2018. Each rockfall costs (in 2016) between $25,000 to $500,000 for the city to clean up. Hamilton has 16 escarpment crossings, each of which is inspected daily. The Access was closed for major, half-year repairs in 2017 and for six weeks in 2021.

== History ==
Sherman Avenue, originally called Shearman Avenue which was named after the first land assessor of the district, nothing more is known of Shearman who remains a man of mystery in Hamilton's history books. Later the name was changed from Shearman to Sherman Avenue in honour of brothers Clifton Sherman (1872–1955) and Frank Sherman (1887–1967), who both founded Dominion Foundries and Steel (later called Dofasco) in 1912, creating a giant that would bring prosperity and identity to the city.

The steel industry continued to grow in the late 19th century through to the early 20th century and finally consolidate through this period, some combining to form the Steel Company of Canada (Stelco) in 1910. Dominion Steel Casting Company (Dofasco) was established two years later in 1912. Later named Dominion Foundries and Steel, the company merged with its subsidiary, Hamilton Steel Wheel Company in 1917. The name was officially changed to Dofasco Inc. in 1980.

On July 15, 1946, after a meeting at the Playhouse Theatre, on Sherman Avenue North, Local 1005 members of the United Steelworkers of America at Stelco marched to the plant gates to start the famous strike of 1946. The fight was over Union recognition, a 40-hour work week and wages. With the help of Hamilton's community this struggle changed Canadian Labour history. It forced employers to accept collective bargaining and helped start a mass trade union movement in Canada.

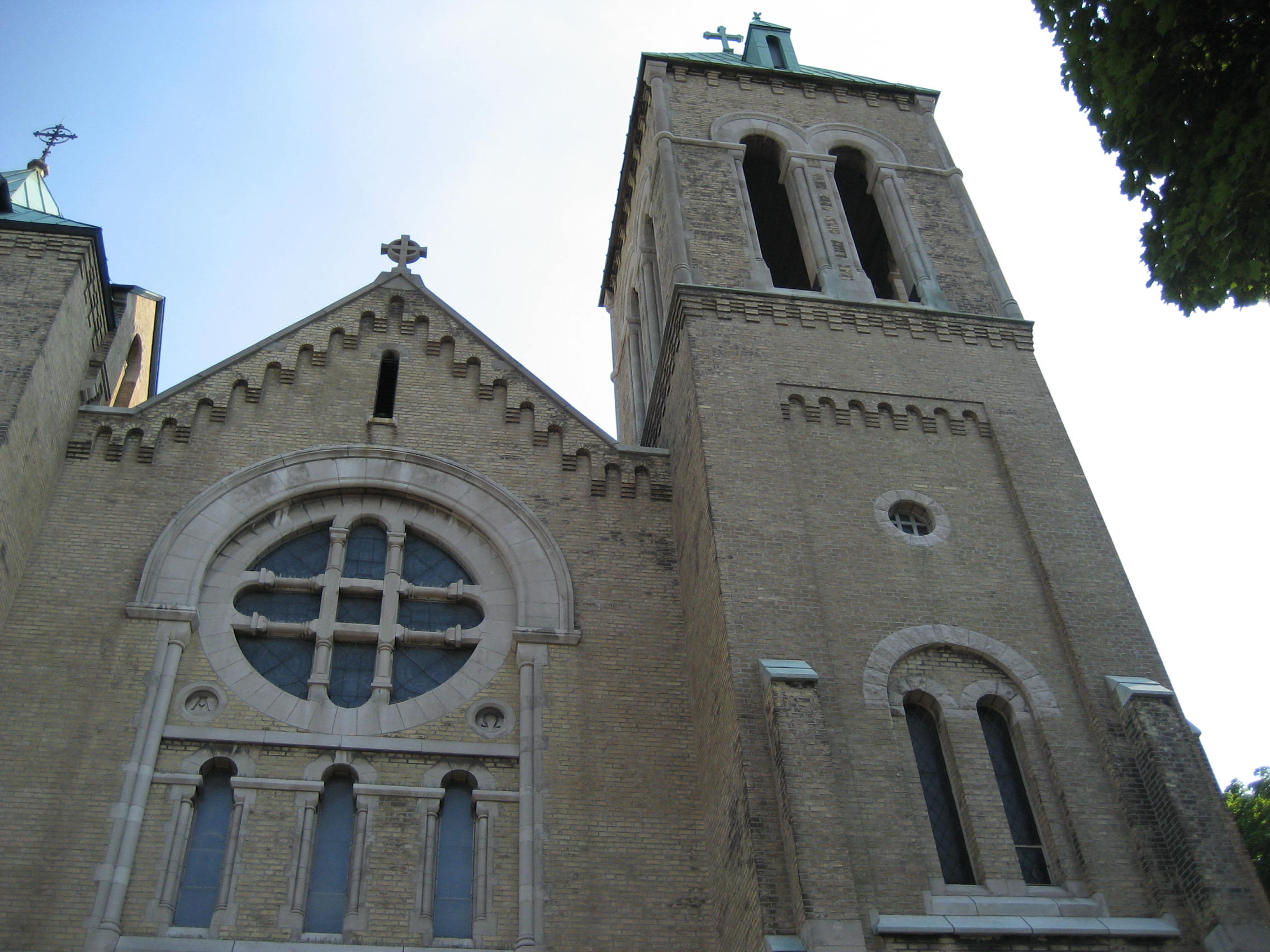
St. Anne's Roman Catholic Church

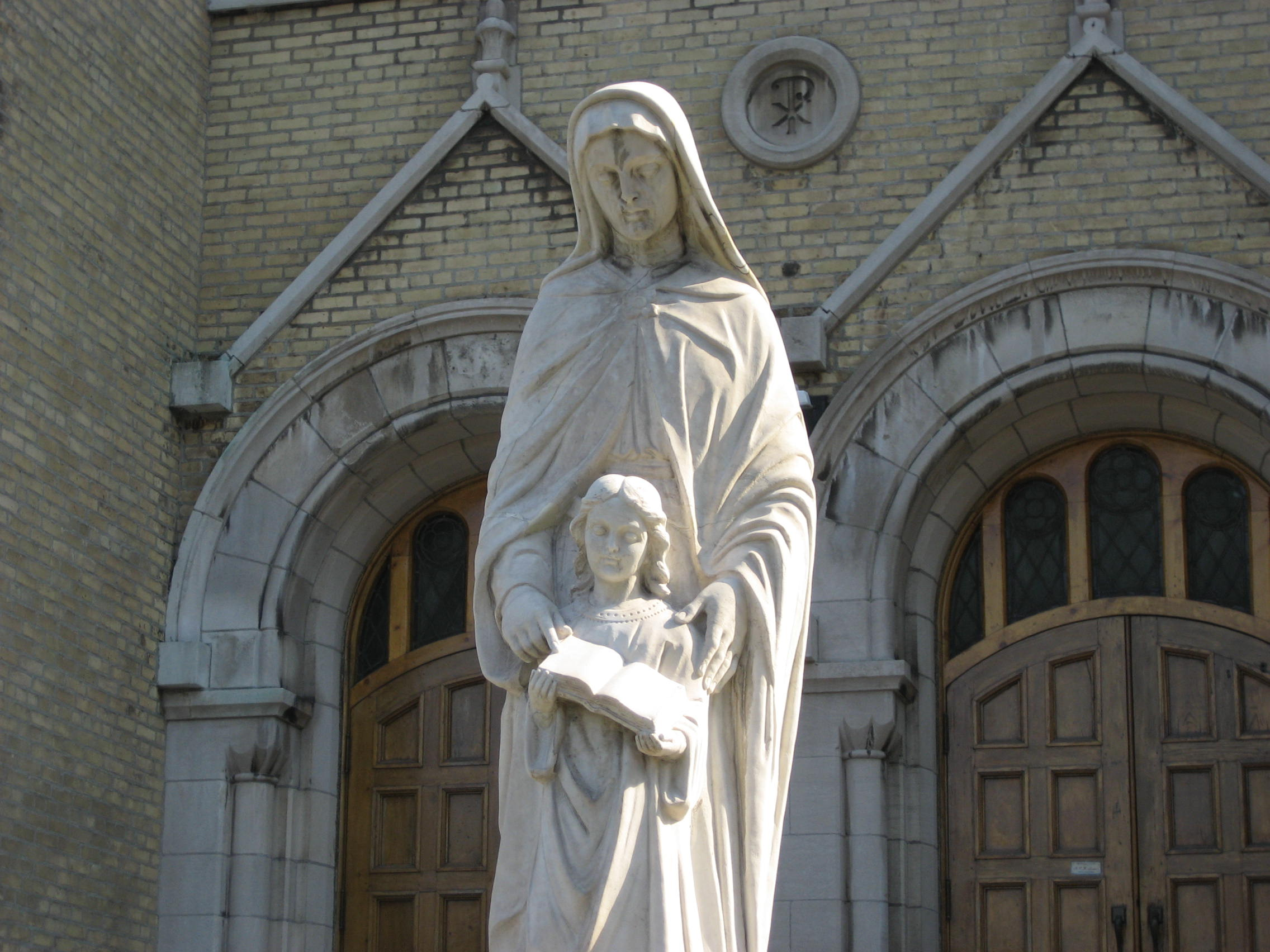
St. Anne's Roman Catholic Church

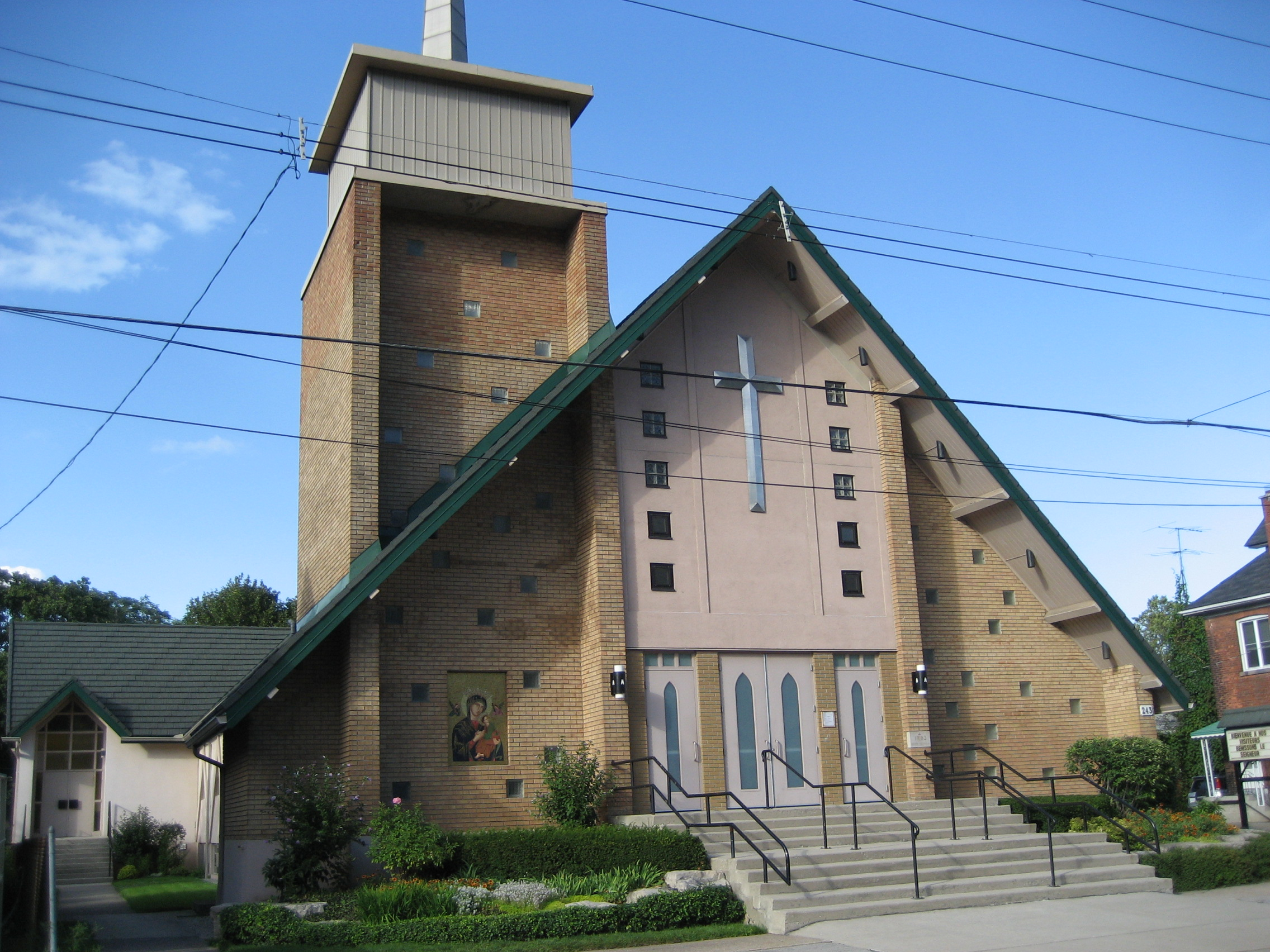
Cumberland Christian Assembly Church

St. Peter's Hospital is a 250-bed chronic care hospital located on Maplewood Avenue 3 blocks east of Sherman Avenue South in downtown Hamilton, Ontario specializing in the care of older adults. The hospital is a part of the St. Peter's Family of Services, which also includes home care, long-term care, and research branches. It was founded by the Anglican Church in 1890.

== Landmarks ==
Note: Listing of Landmarks from North to South.

- Pier 16
- Hamilton Port Authority
- Stelco (Steel Company of Canada), Piers 16, 17, 18 (Sherman Avenue to Ottawa Street)
- Fine Line Signs Company
- Barton Air Fabrications Inc.
- Szabo Carbidde Tooling, Precision tools and die manufacturing (formerly Italian Evangelical Church, 1910–1929)
- Newalta, (Canada's leading industrial waste management and environmental services company)
- Mermaid Limo Service
- Canadian National railway tracks
- Hamilton Hydro Electric System building
- Hamilton Specialty Bar Corporation (formerly Slater Steel)
- 270 Sherman (former Imperial Cotton Company cotton mill)
- The Wallace Barnes Company Limited building
- Metal Industrial Corp.
- Canadian National railway tracks
- Bethal Apostolic Church
- Playhouse Cinema
- St. Ann's Rectory
- St. Peter's Hospital, (off Sherman Avenue, 3 blocks east on Maplewood Avenue)
- Cumberland Christian Assembly Church
- Canadian National railway tracks
- Escarpment Rail Trail (abandoned railway path)
- Bruce Trail
- Mountain Face Park
- Niagara Escarpment (mountain)
- Mountain Face Park
- Escarpment Rail Trail

== Communities ==
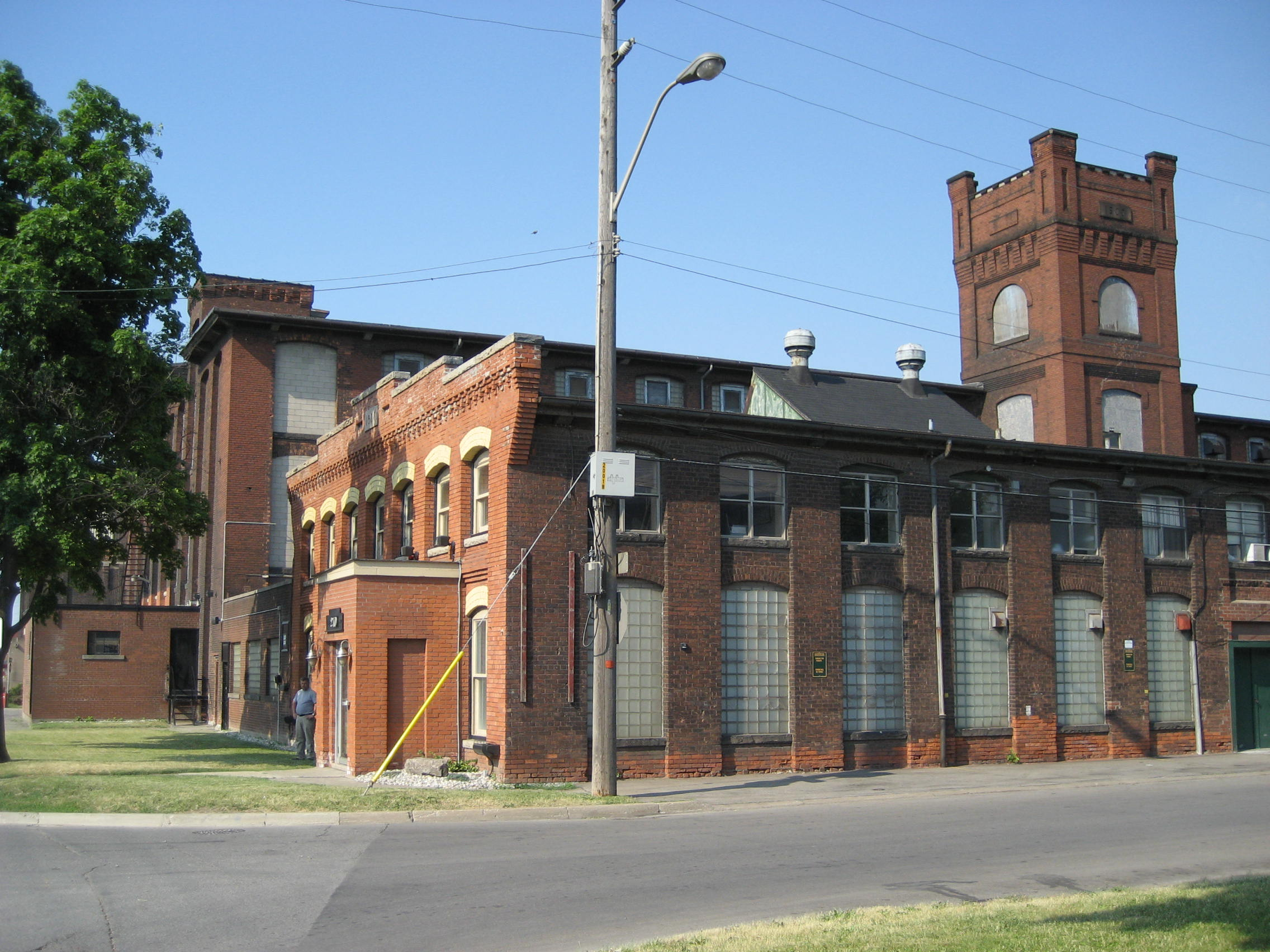
270 Sherman (former Imperial Cotton Company cotton mill), Sherman Ave. North

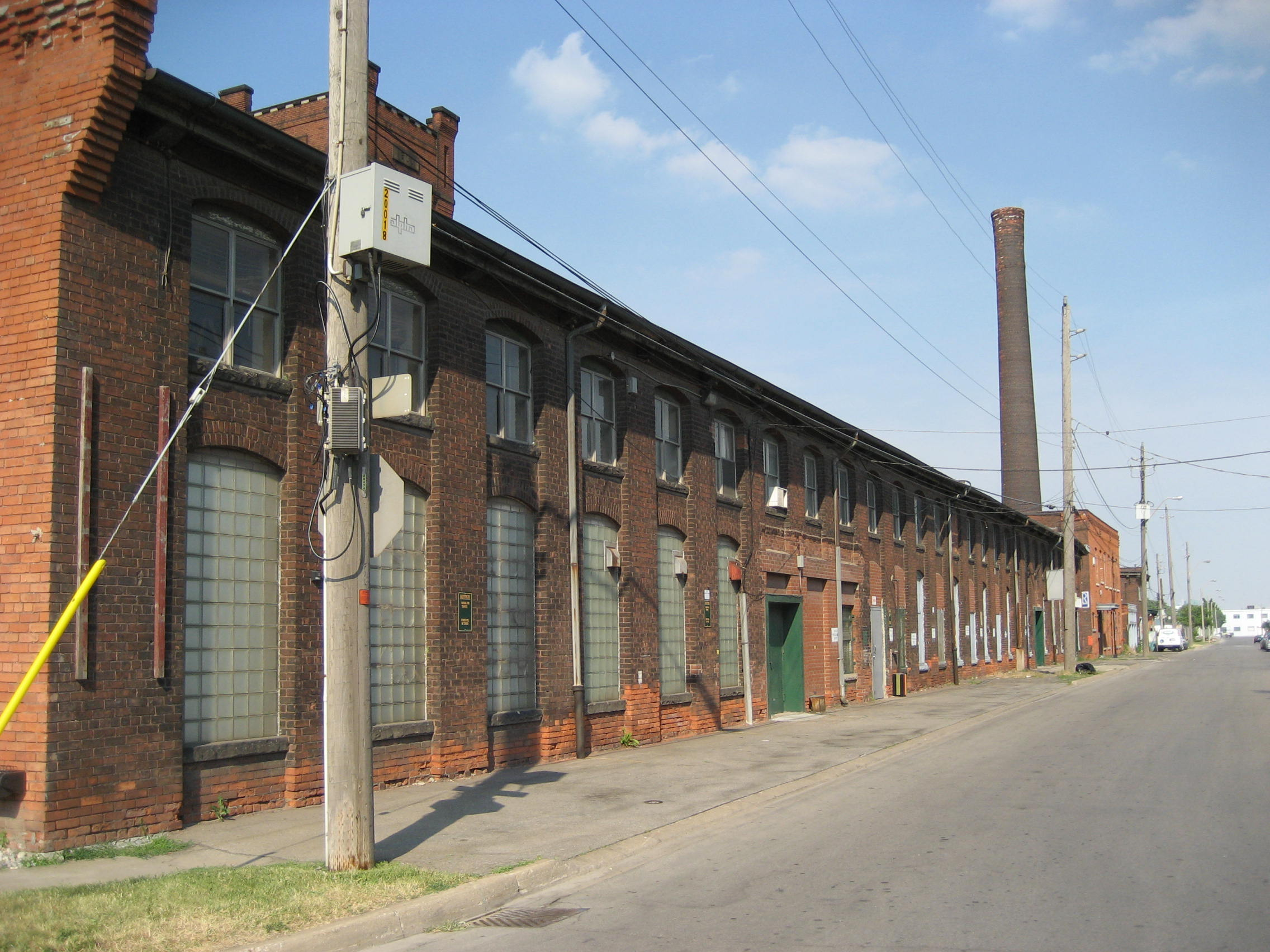
270 Sherman (former Imperial Cotton Company cotton mill), Sherman Ave. North

Note: Listing of neighbourhoods from North to South

- Northend - Everything north of the Canadian National Railway tracks
- Gibson/ Stipeley, Sherman Avenue is the division between these two neighbourhoods.
- St. Clair/ Blakeley, Sherman Avenue is the division between these two neighbourhoods.

== Gallery ==
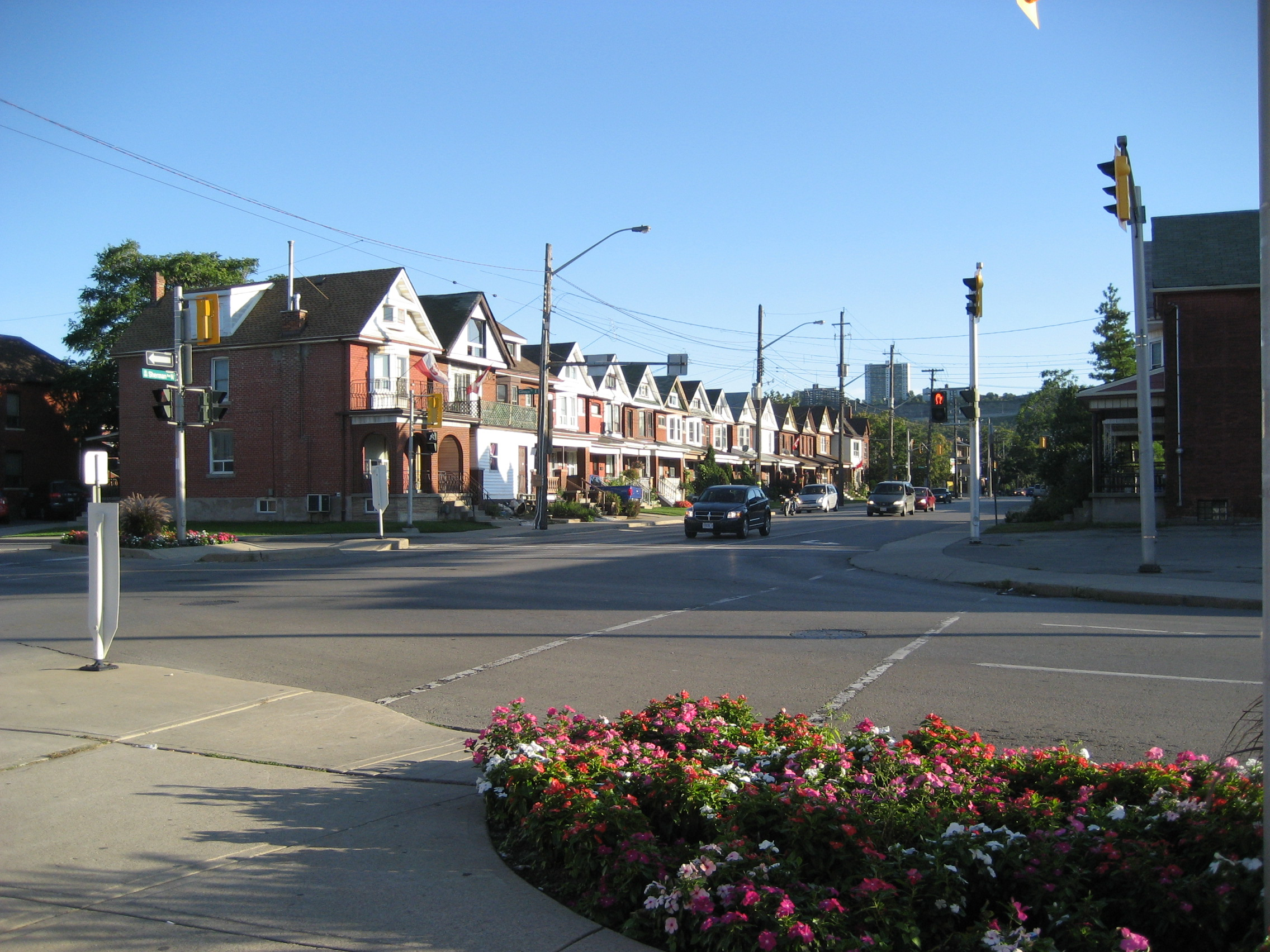
Sherman Avenue looking South

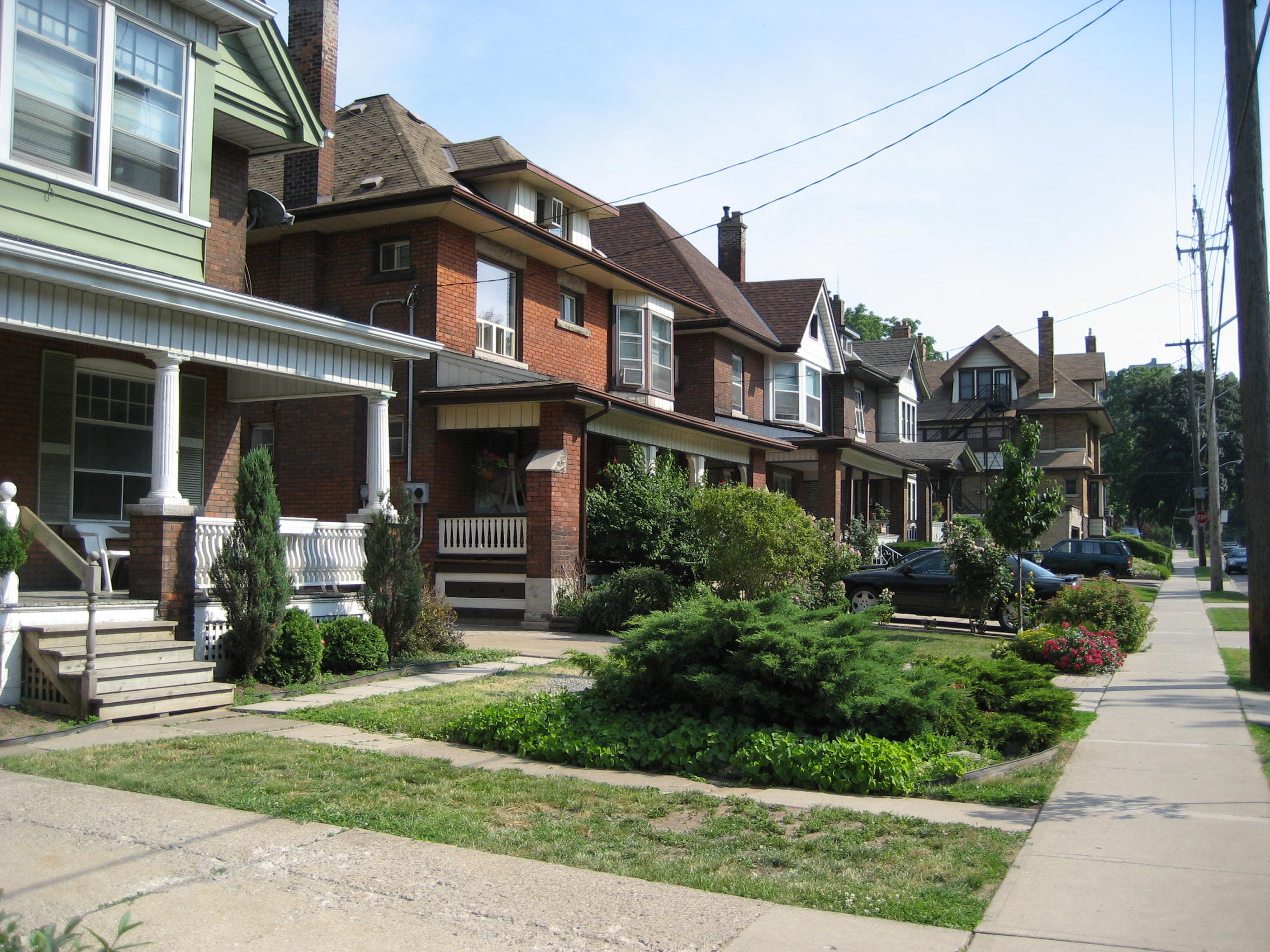
Sherman Avenue South

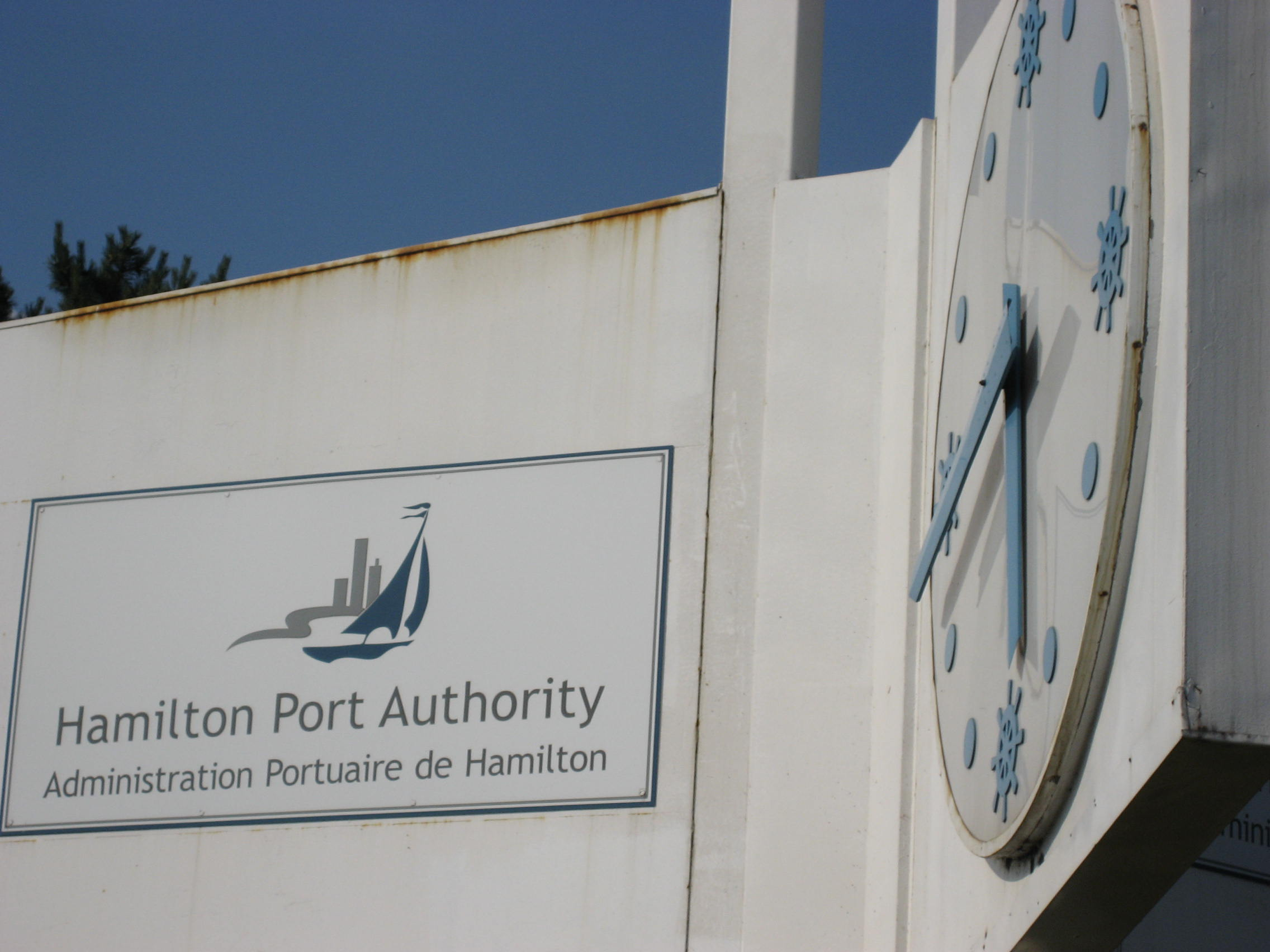
Hamilton Port Authority Sign/ Clock

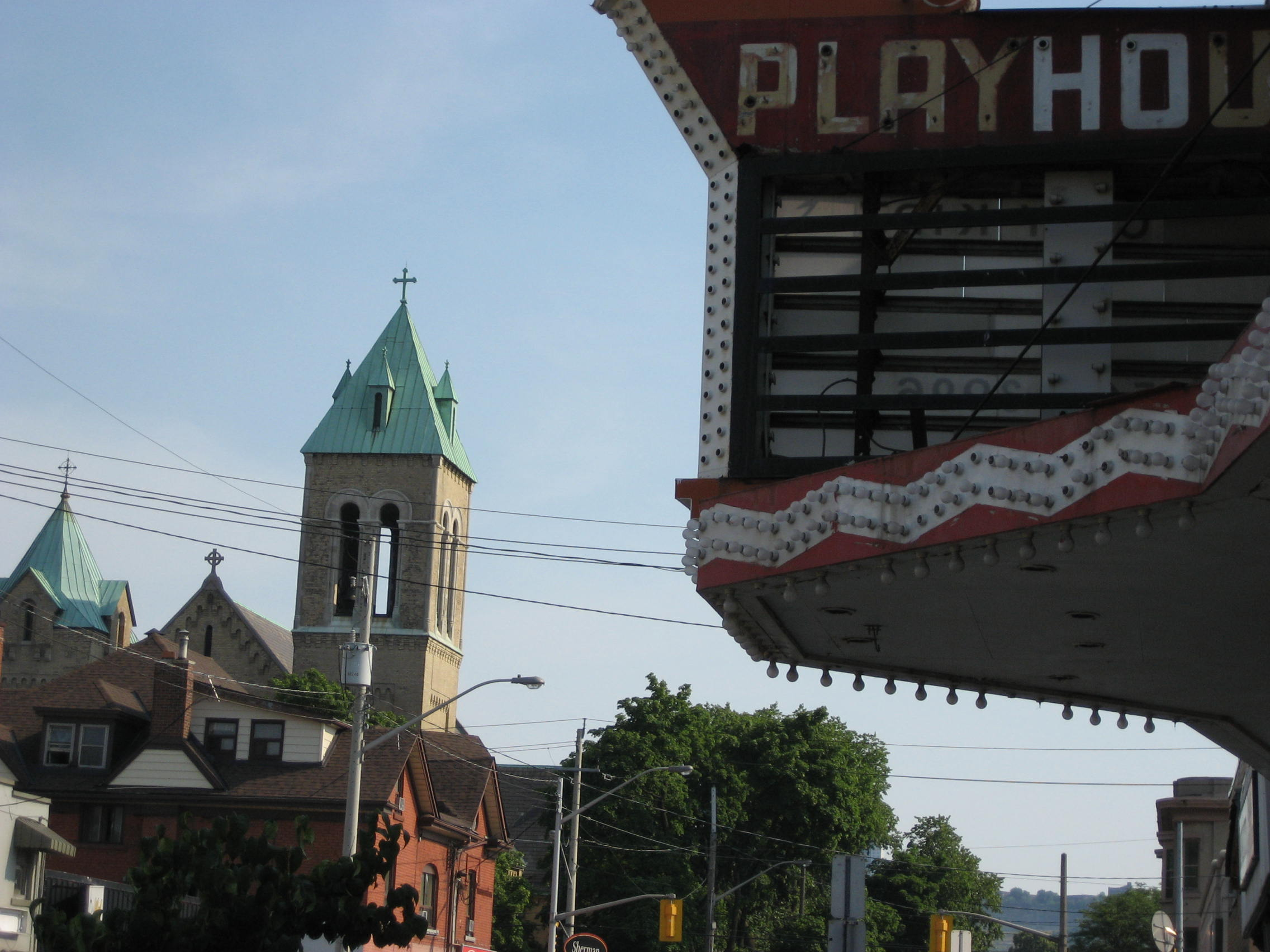
Playhouse Theatre sign, Sherman Ave. North

== See also ==
- Niagara Escarpment Commission
