= Lily Oddie =

Canadian politician (1937–2021)

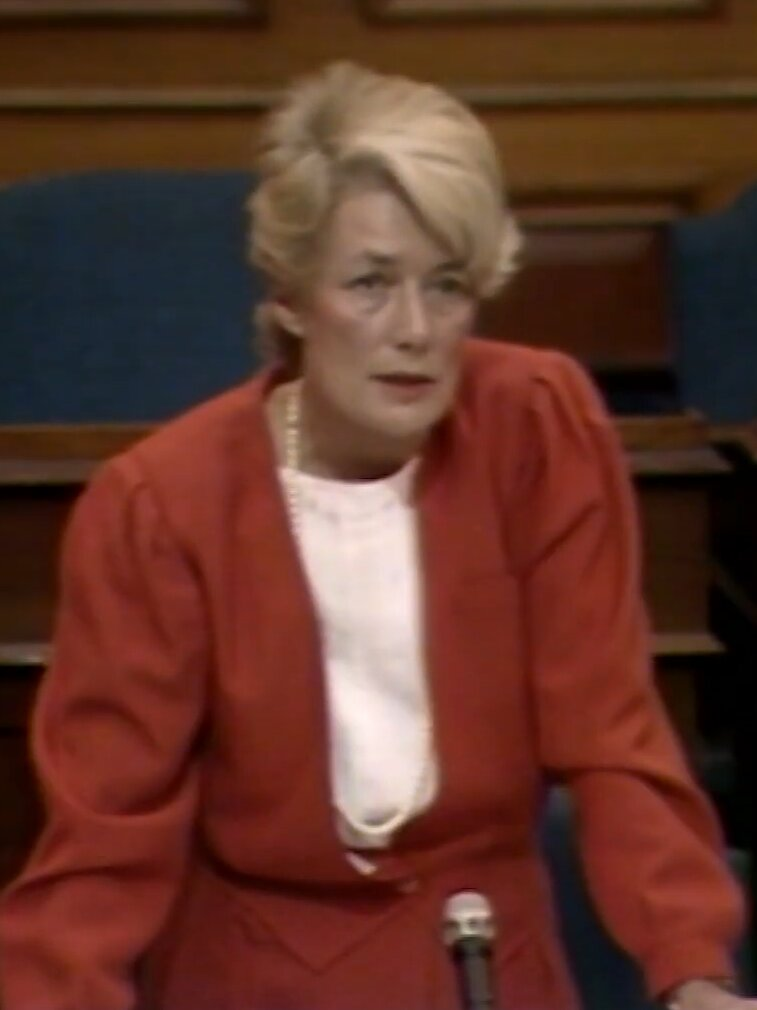
- Oddie in 1986

Ontario MPP
- In office 1985–1990
- Preceded by: Mike Davison
- Succeeded by: David Christopherson
- Constituency: Hamilton Centre

Personal details
- Born: September 27, 1937 England
- Died: April 6, 2021 (aged 83) St. Peter's Hospital, Hamilton, Ontario, Canada
- Party: Liberal
- Domestic partner: John Munro (divorced)
- Occupation: Psychologist

Lily Oddie (September 27, 1937 – April 6, 2021), formerly known as Lily Munro, was a former provincial politician in Ontario, Canada. She is best known for having been involved in a fundraising scandal involving Patti Starr.

Oddie married prominent Liberal politician John Munro on June 27, 1978, and took his surname. John Munro's career would also be undone by scandal in the 1980s, although he was later exonerated of any wrongdoing. The couple would later divorce, at which time Oddie returned to using her original name.

Oddie died at St. Peter's Hospital in Hamilton, Ontario, on April 6, 2021.

== Background ==
Lily Oddie was educated at the University of Alberta and Dalhousie University in Halifax, Nova Scotia, where she earned a Ph.D. She worked as a psychologist after her graduation and was a member of the Psychologists Association of Alberta, the American Education Research Association, the Canadian Association for Adult Education, the Hamilton Status of Women Committee, the Hamilton-Wentworth Industrial-Education Council, and Hamilton Chamber of Commerce Intern and the Year of the Child Committee. Oddie was involved with several organizations including the Hamilton Status of Women, the Canadian Association for Adult Education and the American Education Research Association.

Oddie was the director of the McMaster University School of Adult Education prior to her election to the Ontario Provincial Legislature.

== Politics ==
Oddie first ran for the Legislative Assembly of Ontario in a by-election on December 13, 1984. A Liberal, she lost Sheila Copps's former riding of Hamilton Centre to Mike Davison of the New Democratic Party by 55 votes.

She ran again for the Liberals in the 1985 provincial election. This election was a watershed moment in Ontario politics, as the Progressive Conservative Party which had governed Ontario since 1943 was brought to a precarious minority government status under Frank Miller's leadership. The Ontario Liberal Party under David Peterson dramatically increased the size of their caucus, and Oddie defeated Davison by 384 votes in a rematch from the previous year.

The Liberals formed a minority government after the election, with assistance from the Ontario NDP. Oddie was appointed Minister of Citizenship and Culture on June 26, 1985. She was re-elected with an increased majority in the 1987 provincial election, and was named Minister of Culture and Communications on September 29, 1987.

On August 2, 1989, Oddie was dropped from cabinet after being implicated in the Patti Starr affair. Starr had been accused of improperly diverting money from the Toronto section of the National Council of Jewish Women to the Liberal Party, following donations to the NCJW from corporations linked to the Tridel company of developers (to which Starr was also linked). In the course of investigations surrounding the scandal, it was revealed that Oddie had made use of such donations in her 1987 campaign.

Oddie was not formally accused of wrongdoing, and it is unclear if she had any involvement in the scandal beyond accepting contributions from Starr. Nonetheless, the controversy was deemed significant enough that she resign her portfolio.

She ran for re-election in the 1990 provincial election, but was defeated by David Christopherson of the NDP.

=== Peterson cabinet ===
Peterson ministry, Province of Ontario (1985–1990)
Cabinet posts (2)
Predecessor	Office	Successor
Ed Fulton	Minister of Culture and Communications; 1987–1989	Christine Hart
Susan Fish	Minister of Citizenship and Culture; 1985–1987	Gerry Phillips

== Later career ==
After leaving politics, Oddie worked at the St. Catharines, Ontario YWCA as well as Orlick Industries. She was then appointed an adjudicator to the Refugee Protection Division of the Immigration and Refugee Board. In 2008, she was appointed to the council of the Ontario College of Social Workers and Social Service Workers. Oddie was also on the board of governors for Mohawk College in Hamilton.
