= Thomas Jutten =

Thomas Jutten is the name of:

- Thomas William Jutten (1861–1955), mayor of Hamilton, Ontario, Canada
- Thomas Jutten (cricketer) (1758–1826), English cricketer
