= 2023 Hamilton Centre provincial by-election =

By-election in Ontario

- March 16, 2023

Riding of Hamilton Centre
- Turnout: 21.97%
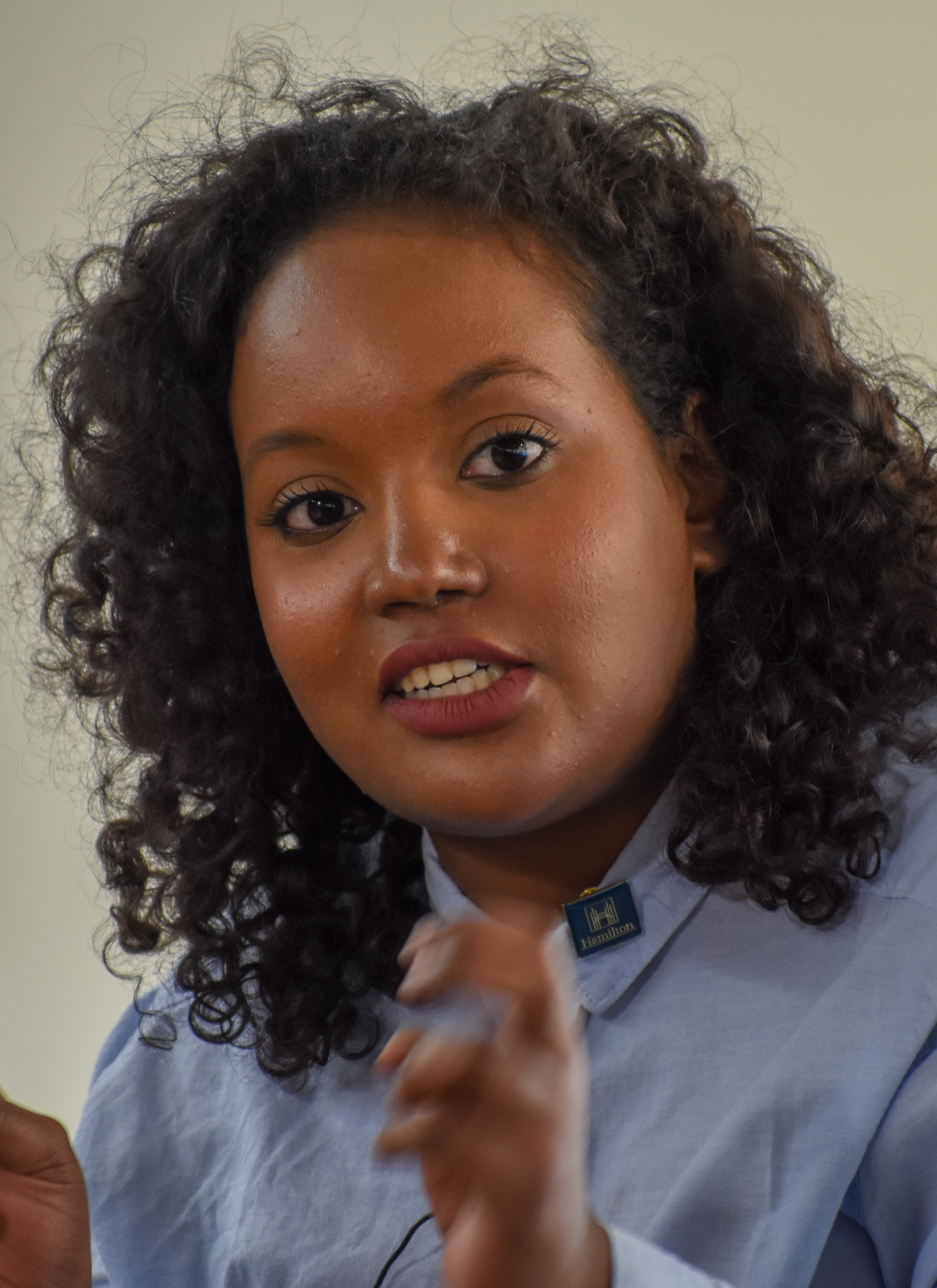

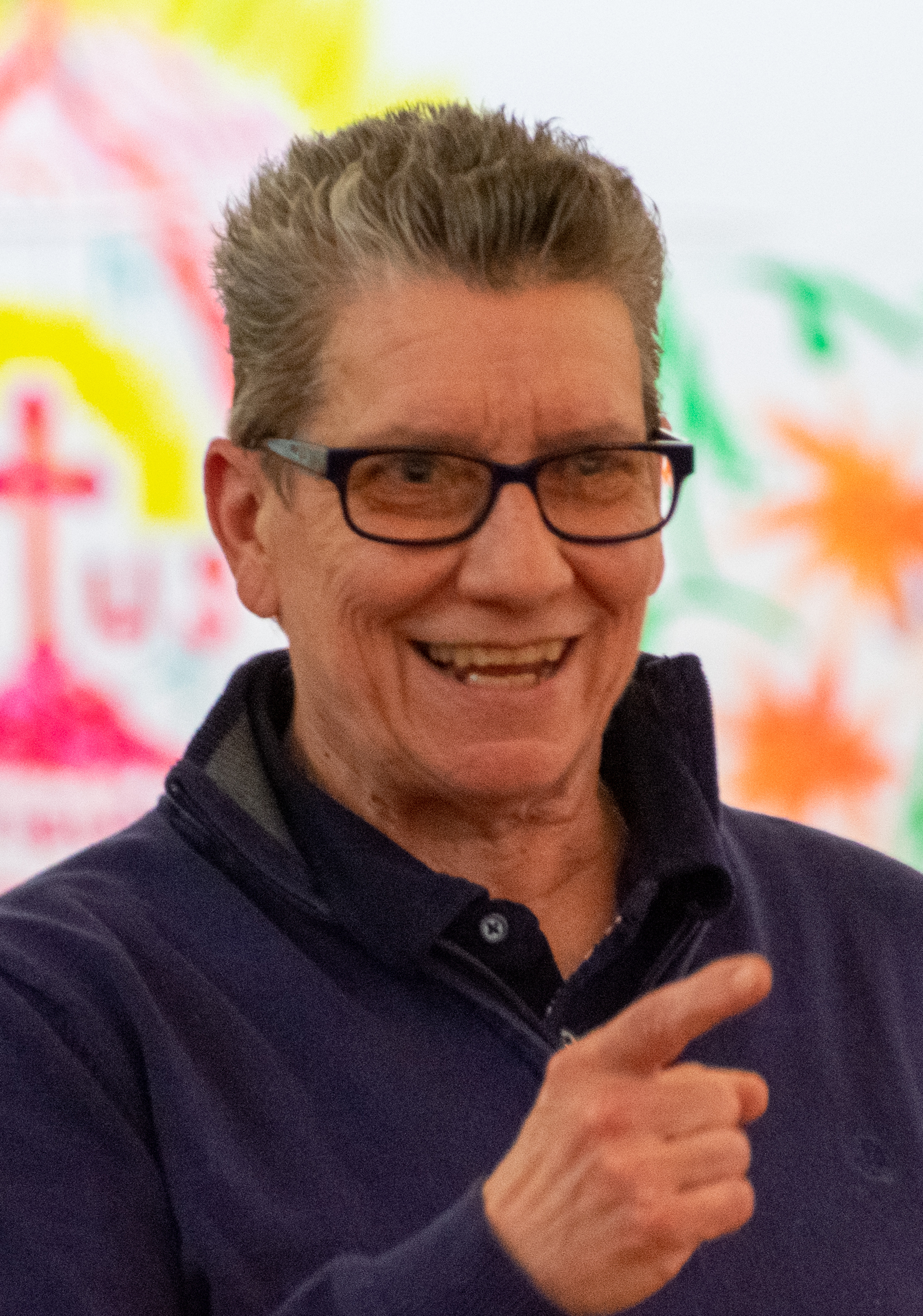
	First party	Second party
Candidate	Sarah Jama	Deirdre Pike
Party	New Democratic	Liberal
Popular vote	9,477	3,542
Percentage	54.28%	20.07%
Swing	▼2.98 pp	▲7.04 pp
	Third party	Fourth party
Candidate	Pete Wiesner	Lucia Iannantuono
Party	Progressive Conservative	Green
Popular vote	2,690	1,206
Percentage	15.52%	6.93%
Swing	▼0.95%	▼1.84 pp
MPP before election
Andrea Horwath
New Democratic
Elected MPP
Sarah Jama
New Democratic

Location of Hamilton Centre in the urban area of Hamilton.

The 2023 Hamilton Centre provincial by-election was held on March 16, 2023. The election was triggered by the resignation of Ontario New Democratic Party (ONDP) MPP Andrea Horwath. ONDP candidate Sarah Jama won the election, retaining the seat for the party.

== Background ==
=== Constituency profile ===
The Hamilton Centre constituency consists of the part of the City of Hamilton bounded by a line drawn south from the city limit along Ottawa Street, west along the Niagara Escarpment, southwest along James Mountain Road, south along West 5th Street, west along Lincoln M. Alexander Parkway, north along the hydroelectric transmission line situated west of Upper Horning Road, northeast along Highway No. 403, east along the Desjardins Canal to Hamilton Harbour.

=== Trigger and campaign ===
On July 26, 2022, incumbent MPP Andrea Horwath announced her candidacy for mayor of Hamilton, and resigned her seat in the provincial legislature on August 15, 2022. The ONDP was considered favoured to retain the seat in the days leading up to the March 2023 election.

== Candidates ==
- Peter House, Electoral Reform Party
- Lucia Iannantuono, Green Party of Ontario
- Sarah Jama, Ontario New Democratic Party
- Matthew Lingard, Independent
- Pete Wiesner, Progressive Conservative Party of Ontario
- Deirdre Pike, Ontario Liberal Party
- Mark Snow, Ontario Libertarian Party
- John Turmel, Independent
- Lee Weiss Vassor, New Blue Party of Ontario
- Nathalie Xian Yi Yan, Independent

== Result ==
Ontario provincial by-election, March 16, 2023: Hamilton Centre Resignation of Andrea Horwath
Party	Candidate	Votes	%	±%
New Democratic	Sarah Jama	9,477	54.22	–3.05
Liberal	Deirdre Pike	3,542	20.26	+7.23
Progressive Conservative	Pete Wiesner	2,690	15.39	–1.08
Green	Lucia Iannantuono	1,206	6.90	–1.86
New Blue	Lee Weiss Vassor	148	0.85	–0.81
Electoral Reform	Peter House	121	0.69	–
Libertarian	Mark Snow	109	0.62	–
Independent	Matthew Lingard	98	0.56	–
Independent	Nathalie Xian Yi Yan	51	0.29	–0.21
Independent	John Turmel	38	0.22	–
Total valid votes		17,480	99.48	
Total rejected, unmarked and declined ballots		91	0.52	–0.47
Turnout		17,571	21.81	–16.12
Eligible voters		80,555		
New Democratic hold		Swing		–5.14
Source: Elections Ontario
