= William Frederick Schwenger =

Canadian politician

MPP for Hamilton Centre
- In office 1934–1938
- Preceded by: Thomas William Jutten
- Succeeded by: John Newlands

Personal details
- Born: 1892
- Died: 1962 (aged 69–70)
- Party: Liberal

William Frederick Schwenger (1892 – 1962) was an Ontario lawyer and political figure. He represented Hamilton Centre in the Legislative Assembly of Ontario from 1934 to 1938 as a Liberal member.

He was born in Hamilton, Ontario, studied at Osgoode Hall Law School and set up practice in Hamilton. Schwenger was named King's Counsel in 1934. He resigned from his seat in 1938 to become a junior judge for Wentworth County, becoming a senior judge in the county court in 1949. He served in that post until his death. He was named to the Hamilton Board of Parks Management in 1948 and became its chairman in 1951. Schwenger was also chairman for the Royal Botanical Gardens from 1949 to 1956.
