= Sarah Jama =

Canadian politician and activist

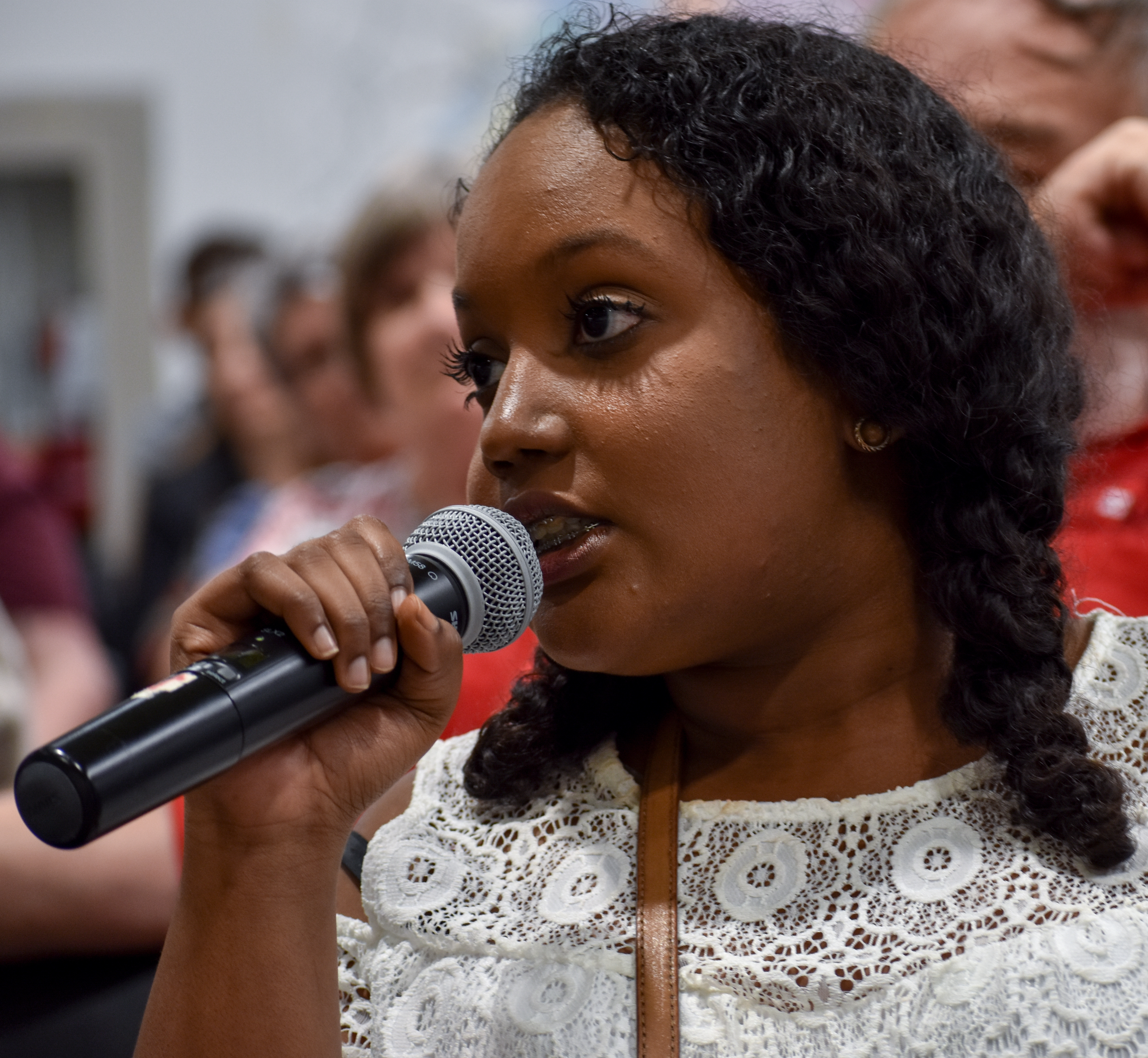
- Jama in 2017

Member of Provincial Parliament for Hamilton Centre
- In office March 16, 2023 – February 27, 2025
- Preceded by: Andrea Horwath
- Succeeded by: Robin Lennox

Personal details
- Born: 1994/1995 (age 31–32)
- Party: Independent (2023–present)
- Other political affiliations: New Democratic (2022–2023)
- Education: McMaster University
- Occupation: Politician; activist
- Website: www.votesarahjama.ca

Sarah Jama (born 1994 or 1995) is a Canadian activist and former politician who was the member of Provincial Parliament (MPP) for Hamilton Centre from 2023 to 2025. Jama was elected as a member of the Ontario New Democratic Party (NDP), but was ejected from the party in 2023 and served as an independent for the remainder of the session.

Jama became involved in accessibility advocacy and pro-Palestine advocacy as a student at McMaster University. She later co-founded the Disability Justice Network Ontario in 2018 and the Hamilton Encampment Support Network in 2021, focusing on affordable housing access. In 2021, Jama was arrested by police in Beasley Park in central Hamilton at a protest against homeless encampment evictions in the city, but the charges against her were dropped.

On October 10, 2023, three days after the Gaza war began, Jama made a social media post criticizing the conflict and calling for an end to the occupation; she did not directly mention the Hamas October 7 attack that killed hundreds of Israelis and saw approximately 1200 people taken hostage. She later apologised for any possible offense to Jewish or Israeli Canadian constituents, but did not retract the post. On October 23, 2023, the NDP removed Jama from its caucus, with party leader Marit Stiles stating that Jama had taken a "number of unilateral actions that have undermined our collective work and broken the trust of her colleagues." The legislature voted to censure Jama on the same day.

Jama served out her term as an independent MPP and was defeated in her re-election attempt in the 2025 Ontario general election.

== Background ==
Jama, a Somali Canadian Muslim, was born with cerebral palsy and uses a walker or wheelchair for mobility.

She attended McMaster University, where she obtained a social sciences degree. At McMaster, she ran for student union presidency, and was disqualified for exceeding campaign spending limits and retweeting a "Bad Taste" article. Her disqualification was lifted on appeal, and she came in second upon re-tabulation of the votes.

== Activism ==
In 2014 she wrote on disability justice issues for the magazine of the Young Communist League of Canada, Rebel Youth. In 2016 she served as Ontario director for the National Educational Association of Disabled Students, and was named one of Hamilton's "most interesting people" by the CBC for her work in organizing an "Anti-Racism Action Initiative" and her disability justice activism. Jama was involved in accessibility advocacy and pro-Palestine advocacy at McMaster University.

Jama co-founded the Disability Justice Network Ontario in September 2018 and co-founded the Hamilton Encampment Support Network in 2021, focusing on affordable housing access. In February 2021, she appeared before the Senate of Canada's legal and constitutional affairs committee to argue against the proposed Bill C-7, which she said made euthanasia more accessible for people with mental health disabilities, rather than providing mental health support.

In 2021, Jama was arrested by police in Beasley Park in central Hamilton at a protest against homeless encampment evictions in the city. She was charged with obstructing police and assaulting a police officer. Charges against her were later withdrawn after she entered into a peace bond. The peace bond prohibited her from crossing police caution tape, interfering with police operations related to homeless people, and participating in illegal or violent demonstrations.

== Politics ==
=== 2022 ===
Jama sought the provincial NDP nomination for run in an upcoming by-election to represent Hamilton Centre in the Legislative Assembly of Ontario, after former MPP and NDP leader Andrea Horwath resigned to run for mayor. Jama was named the NDP candidate in October 2022.

=== 2023 ===
Jama's campaign drew controversy over a statement she made in 2021 that Israel is funding "the killing of people here locally and globally", for which she later apologized.

On March 16, 2023, Jama was elected as the MPP for Hamilton Centre, garnering 9,477 votes, comprising 54% of the vote.

==== Khader Adnan controversy ====
In May 2023, Jama retweeted a post about the death of Palestinian prisoner and hunger-striker Khader Adnan, a former spokesperson for of the Palestinian Islamic Jihad, which is listed as a terrorist entity in Canada. The post called him a "martyr for freedom". Both B’nai Brith Canada and the Centre for Israel and Jewish Affairs criticized Jama for sharing the post, B'nai Brith noting that he was a convicted terrorist. Canadians for Justice and Peace in the Middle East opined that Jama was being "unfairly attacked" for retweeting the statement and noted "It would be wrong for the ONDP [Ontario NDP] to punish their MPP for drawing attention to a powerful example of non-violent struggle against Israeli apartheid".

==== Censure by the Legislature ====
On October 10, 2023, two days after the Gaza war began, Jama generated controversy by posting a statement under Ontario NDP letterhead referring to the "apartheid" and writing about what she described as "continued violation of human rights in Gaza" by Israel, without mentioning either Hamas or the killing three days earlier by Hamas of hundreds of Israelis. She also called for the "end [of] all occupation of Palestinian land" and offered her sympathies to people mourning on both sides.

Her statement was criticized by Ontario NDP leader Marit Stiles, and prompted Ontario Liberal leader John Fraser, Premier Doug Ford, and Jewish organizations such as Holocaust education group Friends of Simon Wiesenthal Center, and the Centre for Israel and Jewish Affairs to call for her resignation from caucus. Ford also publicly stated that Jama had a "long and well-documented history of antisemitism" and "hateful views", and that she "publicly support[ed] the rape and murder of innocent Jewish people", and called for her to resign. In response to Ford's statement, Jama served Ford's office a cease and desist letter and threatened to sue him for libel; she never did, however, and her timeframe to do so expired. Although Jama released her statements under NDP letterhead, the party was not made aware of the pending statement, and had not endorsed Jama's positions. Stiles privately met with Jama asking her to remove the statement and apologize; Jama subsequently apologized for her posts in a reply to them about 24 hours later on Twitter, but refused to remove the statements and instead pinned her statement to the top of her feed on X.

On October 23, 2023, the legislature voted 63–23 to censure Jama in response to her comments. The NDP voted against the censure, with Stiles noting that it was an "extreme motion" and that "We do not believe the government should use its majority to strip a member of their right to speak and vote. This is an extreme step that will disenfranchise the voters of Hamilton Centre". As a result, she is banned from speaking in the chamber until and unless she retracts and deletes her original statement and formally apologizes.

On May 23, 2024, the Ontario Superior Court of Justice, by way of a three-justice panel, dismissed her request for a judicial review of her censure.

==== Removal from the NDP caucus ====
On the day of the censure vote, Jama was removed from the NDP caucus. In an official party statement, Stiles noted that Jama had been uncooperative with NDP colleagues, making unilateral decisions without party endorsement and endangering the work environment of NDP staff, and had broken the terms of an agreement Stiles had made with Jama, which would have kept her affiliated with the party following Jama's statements on the Israel–Hamas war. Officials said that staff had worked with Jama on a statement, but it differed from what she said instead publicly in the moments preceding her expulsion. She also had not informed the party about her intention to threaten the Premier with legal action.

==== Letter denying rapes by Hamas ====
In November 2023, Jama signed an open letter denying that Israeli women were subjected to rape and sexual violence during 2023 Hamas attack on Israel. On November 21, her office stated that Jama had removed her name from the letter.

=== 2024 ===
==== Keffiyeh controversy ====
In April 2024, House Speaker Ted Arnott introduced a keffiyeh ban in the Ontario legislature, saying it was being worn to make an overt political statement, which is against the rules of the legislature. In the days following the ban, she refused to remove her keffiyeh, and Arnott ordered Jama to leave the chamber and she was subsequently banned from legislature for the rest of the day. This event repeated itself numerous times at Queen's Park, and two other members of the NDP followed in her footsteps. On May 6, 2024, Ted Arnott loosened the rules surrounding the keffiyeh to allow it to be worn in the Queen's Park assembly building legislative precinct except inside the house legislative chamber and galleries. On May 6, 2024, Jama was ordered to leave the chambers. Jama said she had no intention of ending her stand of solidarity with the Palestinian people.

==== Support for intifada ====
In May 2024, Jama speaking to a pro-Palestine protest encampment at McMaster University yelled: "Globalize the intifada." This prompted concern from a number of quarters, including B’nai Brith and the Centre for Israel and Jewish Affairs.

=== 2025 ===
In early January 2025, Jama filed paperwork to run for the NDP in the 2025 general election. Her candidacy to run for the NDP was supported by Hamilton Centre Member of Parliament Matthew Green and by the Ontario NDP riding executive. On January 27, 2025, her candidacy was rejected by the party, with Jama deciding to run as an independent in the 2025 Ontario general election. She placed fourth, with Robin Lennox retaking the riding for the NDP.

== Electoral record ==
2025 Ontario general election: Hamilton Centre
Party	Candidate	Votes	%	±%	Expenditures
New Democratic	Robin Lennox	12,839	38.36	–15.86	$91,418
Liberal	Eileen Walker	7,132	21.31	+1.05	$23,776
Progressive Conservative	Sarah Bokhari	6,331	18.92	+3.53	$31,595
Independent	Sarah Jama	4,977	14.87	–39.35	$123,287
Green	Lucia Iannantuono	1,642	4.91	–1.99	$6,292
New Blue	Mitch Novosad	441	1.32	+0.47	$0
Independent	Nathalie Xian Yi Yan	107	0.32	+0.03	$0
Total valid votes/expense limit		33,469	99.66	–	$127,836
Total rejected, unmarked and declined ballots		113	0.34	–0.18	
Turnout		33,582	42.29	+20.48	
Eligible voters		79,401			
New Democratic gain from Independent		Swing		–8.46	
Source: Elections Ontario

Ontario provincial by-election, March 16, 2023: Hamilton Centre Resignation of Andrea Horwath
Party	Candidate	Votes	%	±%
New Democratic	Sarah Jama	9,477	54.22	–3.05
Liberal	Deirdre Pike	3,542	20.26	+7.23
Progressive Conservative	Pete Wiesner	2,690	15.39	–1.08
Green	Lucia Iannantuono	1,206	6.90	–1.86
New Blue	Lee Weiss Vassor	148	0.85	–0.81
Electoral Reform	Peter House	121	0.69	–
Libertarian	Mark Snow	109	0.62	–
Independent	Matthew Lingard	98	0.56	–
Independent	Nathalie Xian Yi Yan	51	0.29	–0.21
Independent	John Turmel	38	0.22	–
Total valid votes		17,480	99.48	
Total rejected, unmarked and declined ballots		91	0.52	–0.47
Turnout		17,571	21.81	–16.12
Eligible voters		80,555		
New Democratic hold		Swing		–5.14
Source: Elections Ontario

== See also ==
- Somali Canadians
