= George Charles Coppley =

George Charles Coppley (March 18, 1858 – October 15, 1936) was the mayor of Hamilton, Ontario, Canada from 1921 to 1922.

Born in Chelmsford, Essex, England, Coppley came to Canada in 1879. In 1921, he was elected mayor. Again elected in 1922, he restructured Hamilton's government. He was defeated in 1923 by Thomas William Jutten.
