= John Newlands (Canadian politician) =

Canadian politician

John Newlands was a salesman and politician in Ontario, Canada. He represented Hamilton Centre in the Legislative Assembly of Ontario from 1938 to 1943 as a Liberal.

The son of David Newlands and Elizabeth Cargeghan, he was born in Hamilton and was educated there. In 1915, he married Elizabeth Bradwell Mitchell. Newlands served as Hamilton harbour commissioner from 1921 to 1939 and as Hamilton hydro commissioner from 1934 to 1938. He was a freemason.

Newlands ran unsuccessfully for the Hamilton East seat in the Canadian House of Commons in 1921 and again in 1925. He was elected to the Ontario assembly in a 1938 by-election held after William Frederick Schwenger was named a judge for Wentworth County.
