= St. Peter's Hospital (Hamilton) =

- Hamilton Health Sciences

Geography
- Location: Hamilton, Ontario, Canada
- Coordinates: 43°14′40″N 79°50′13″W

Organization
- Care system: Public Medicare (Canada) (OHIP)
- Type: Specialist
- Affiliated university: Michael G. DeGroote School of Medicine, Mohawk College

Services
- Emergency department: No
- Beds: 250
- Speciality: Elderly care, Long-term care

History
- Founded: 1890

Links
- Website: http://www.hhsc.ca/body.cfm?id=1575
- Lists: Hospitals in Canada

St. Peter's Hospital is a 250-bed chronic care hospital located in East Hamilton, Ontario specializing in the care of older adults. The hospital became a part of Hamilton Health Sciences in 2008.

== Overview ==
St. Peter’s Hospital is specializing in the delivery of complex care for adults with chronic illness. St. Peter’s provides inpatient, outpatient, and community-based programs and services that focus on Dementia, Aging, Palliative Care and Rehabilitation. It is also home to St. Peter’s Juravinski Research Centre where an interdisciplinary research team is focused on dementia.

St. Peter's main campus is located at 88 Maplewood Avenue 3-blocks east of Sherman Avenue. Founded at this site by the Anglican Church in 1890 as "St. Peter's Home for the Incurables", St. Peter's now also oversees a long-term care facility on Hamilton Mountain. Construction work began in August 2007 on the new "Alexander Pavilion", so-named for the financial contributions made by The Hon. Lincoln Alexander, above the western end of the main building. This structure will replace the aging south wing which housed the Behavioural Health unit. The relatively modern east and west wings house the remainder of Behavioural Health and the entirety of the Complex Continuing Care, Palliative Care, Rehabilitation, and day hospital programs.

As a chronic care facility, St. Peter's admits patients by referral and has no emergency department accessible to the public.

505 staff members support and deliver care to patients; clinical staff include nurses, physiotherapists, occupational therapists, social workers, other specialized therapists, and physicians.

Hamilton Health Sciences Foundation raises funds to support St. Peter's Hospital including: equipment, facilities, research and staff education.
