= Vernon Charles Knowles =

Canadian politician

- Born: December 20, 1897; St. Thomas, Ontario
- Died: 1985 (aged 87–88)
- Years active: 1945–1948
- Political party: Conservative
- Spouse: Ina Jean McVittie
- Parents: Robert C. Knowles (father); Caroline Mary Buck (mother)

Vernon Charles Knowles (December 20, 1897 – 1985) was a politician in Ontario, Canada. He represented Hamilton Centre in the Legislative Assembly of Ontario from 1945 to 1948 as a Conservative.

The son of Robert C. Knowles and Caroline Mary Buck, he was born in St. Thomas and was educated in Toronto and New York City. His mother was a direct descendant of Laura Secord. In 1930, Knowles married Ina Jean McVittie. He worked as a sales manager and served on Hamilton city council from 1943 to 1945.
