= Robert Desmond Thornberry =

Canadian politician and businessman

Robert Desmond Thornberry (November 8, 1907 – 1969) was a businessperson and politician in Ontario, Canada. He represented Hamilton Centre in the Legislative Assembly of Ontario from 1943 to 1945 and from 1948 to 1951 as a Co-operative Commonwealth Federation (CCF) member.

The son of William Thornberry and Lydia Hall, both natives of Ireland, he came to Canada in 1921. Thornberry attended technical school in Hamilton. In 1931, he married Violet Con. He was employed as the vice-president of a dairy company. Thornberry served on Hamilton city council from 1940 to 1942, prior to being elected to the provincial legislature.

In 1951, Thornberry introduced a private member's bill to reduce the maximum work week from 48 hours to 40 hours but the Conservative majority voted to delay discussion on the bill until after the end of the current session of the legislature, in effect killing any further action on the bill.
