= Hamilton Centre (provincial electoral district) =

Provincial electoral district in Ontario, Canada

Coordinates: 43.250°N 79.854°W

Ontario electoral district
- Hamilton Centre in relation to the other Hamilton ridings

Provincial electoral district
- Legislature: Legislative Assembly of Ontario
MPP
Robin Lennox
New Democratic
- First contested: 2007
- Last contested: 2025

Demographics
- Population (2021): 106,439
- Electors (2025): 78,879
- Area (km²): 47
- Pop. density (per km²): 2,264.7
- Census division: Hamilton
- Census subdivision: Hamilton

Hamilton Centre is a provincial electoral district in Ontario, Canada, that is represented in the Legislative Assembly of Ontario.

It was created for the 1926 provincial election but abolished with the 1999 provincial election when the number of constituencies represented in the legislature was reduced. It was re-created for the 2007 election from parts of Hamilton East, Hamilton West ridings. It consists of the part of the city of Hamilton bounded by a line drawn south from the city limit along Kenilworth Avenue, west along the Niagara Escarpment, northeast along Highway No. 403, east along the Desjardins Canal to Hamilton Harbour.

== Members of Provincial Parliament ==
Hamilton Centre
Assembly	Years	Member	Party
Riding re-created from Hamilton East, and Hamilton West
17th	1926–1929	Thomas William Jutten	Conservative
18th	1929–1934	Thomas William Jutten	Conservative
19th	1934–1937	William Frederick Schwenger	Liberal
20th	1937–1938	William Frederick Schwenger	Liberal
20th	1938–1943	John Newlands	Liberal
21st	1943–1945	Robert Desmond Thornberry	Co-operative Commonwealth
22nd	1945–1948	Vernon Charles Knowles	Progressive Conservative
23rd	1948–1951	Robert Desmond Thornberry	Co-operative Commonwealth
24th	1951–1955	Bill Warrender	Progressive Conservative
25th	1955–1959	Bill Warrender	Progressive Conservative
26th	1959–1963	Bill Warrender	Progressive Conservative
27th	1963–1967	Ada Pritchard	Progressive Conservative
28th	1967–1971	Norman Davison	New Democratic
29th	1971–1975	Norman Davison	New Democratic
30th	1975–1977	Mike Davison	New Democratic
31st	1977–1981	Mike Davison	New Democratic
32nd	1981–1984	Sheila Copps	Liberal
32nd	1984–1985	Mike Davison	New Democratic
33rd	1985–1987	Lily Oddie Munro	Liberal
34th	1987–1990	Lily Oddie Munro	Liberal
35th	1990–1995	David Christopherson	New Democratic
36th	1995–1999	David Christopherson	New Democratic
Riding dissolved into Hamilton East, and Hamilton West
Riding re-created from Hamilton East, and Hamilton West
39th	2007–2011	Andrea Horwath	New Democratic
40th	2011–2014	Andrea Horwath	New Democratic
41st	2014–2018	Andrea Horwath	New Democratic
42nd	2018–2022	Andrea Horwath	New Democratic
43rd	2022–2022	Andrea Horwath	New Democratic
43rd	2023–2023	Sarah Jama	New Democratic
43rd	2023–2025	Sarah Jama	Independent
44th	2025–present	Robin Lennox	New Democratic

== Election results ==
=== Hamilton Centre, 2007–present ===
Winning party in each polling division of Hamilton Centre at the 2025 Ontario general election

2025 Ontario general election
Party	Candidate	Votes	%	±%	Expenditures
New Democratic	Robin Lennox	12,839	38.36	–15.86	$91,418
Liberal	Eileen Walker	7,132	21.31	+1.05	$23,776
Progressive Conservative	Sarah Bokhari	6,331	18.92	+3.53	$31,595
Independent	Sarah Jama	4,977	14.87	–39.35	$123,287
Green	Lucia Iannantuono	1,642	4.91	–1.99	$6,292
New Blue	Mitch Novosad	441	1.32	+0.47	$0
Independent	Nathalie Xian Yi Yan	107	0.32	+0.03	$0
Total valid votes/expense limit		33,469	99.66	–	$127,836
Total rejected, unmarked and declined ballots		113	0.34	–0.18	
Turnout		33,582	42.29	+20.48	
Eligible voters		79,401			
New Democratic gain from Independent		Swing		–8.46	
Source: Elections Ontario

Ontario provincial by-election, March 16, 2023 Resignation of Andrea Horwath
Party	Candidate	Votes	%	±%
New Democratic	Sarah Jama	9,477	54.22	–3.05
Liberal	Deirdre Pike	3,542	20.26	+7.23
Progressive Conservative	Pete Wiesner	2,690	15.39	–1.08
Green	Lucia Iannantuono	1,206	6.90	–1.86
New Blue	Lee Weiss Vassor	148	0.85	–0.81
Electoral Reform	Peter House	121	0.69	–
Libertarian	Mark Snow	109	0.62	–
Independent	Matthew Lingard	98	0.56	–
Independent	Nathalie Xian Yi Yan	51	0.29	–0.21
Independent	John Turmel	38	0.22	–
Total valid votes		17,480	99.48	
Total rejected, unmarked and declined ballots		91	0.52	–0.47
Turnout		17,571	21.81	–16.12
Eligible voters		80,555		
New Democratic hold		Swing		–5.14
Source: Elections Ontario

Winning party in each polling division of Hamilton Centre at the 2022 Ontario general election

2022 Ontario general election
Party	Candidate	Votes	%	±%	Expenditures
New Democratic	Andrea Horwath	16,690	57.26	–7.99	$91,582
Progressive Conservative	Sarah Bokhari	4,800	16.47	+0.80	$11,970
Liberal	Ekaterini Dimakis	3,799	13.03	+2.15	$11,923
Green	Sandy Crawley	2,554	8.76	+3.02	$591
New Blue	John Chroust	483	1.66	–	$0
Ontario Party	Brad Peace	451	1.55	–	$589
Communist	Nigel Cheriyan	225	0.77	+0.41	$0
Independent	Nathalie Xian Yi Yan	145	0.50	–	$0
Total valid votes/expense limit		29,147	99.01	–	$108,893
Total rejected, unmarked and declined ballots		291	0.99	–0.19	
Turnout		29,438	37.94	–10.97	
Eligible voters		77,599			
New Democratic hold		Swing		–4.40	
Source: Elections Ontario

2018 Ontario general election
Party	Candidate	Votes	%	±%	Expenditures
New Democratic	Andrea Horwath	23,866	65.25	+10.70	$54,049
Progressive Conservative	Dionne Duncan	5,730	15.67	+3.00	$15,966
Liberal	Deirdre Pike	3,982	10.89	−11.04	$30,349
Green	Jason Lopez	2,102	5.75	−3.46	$3,408
None of the Above	Tony Lemma	320	0.87	–	$0
Libertarian	Robert Young	285	0.78	–	none listed
Independent	Maria Anastasiou	156	0.43	–	none listed
Communist	Mary Ellen Campbell	134	0.37	–	none listed
Total valid votes		36,575	98.82		
Total rejected, unmarked and declined ballots		436	1.18	–0.94	
Turnout		37,011	48.91	+4.15	
Eligible voters		75,672			
New Democratic hold		Swing		+3.85	
Source: Elections Ontario

^ Results are compared to redistributed results

2014 general election redistributed results
Party	Vote	%
New Democratic	16,248	54.55
Liberal	6,532	21.93
Progressive Conservative	3,773	12.67
Green	2,741	9.20
Others	489	1.64

2014 Ontario general election
Party	Candidate	Votes	%	±%
New Democratic	Andrea Horwath	18,697	52.01	–9.32
Liberal	Donna Tiqui-Shebib	8,450	23.50	+6.04
Progressive Conservative	John Vail	5,173	14.39	+1.22
Green	Peter Ormond	3,067	8.53	+4.81
Freedom	Peter Melanson	334	0.93	+0.54
Communist	Bob Mann	229	0.64	+0.27
Total valid votes		35,950	97.88	
Total rejected, unmarked and declined ballots		778	2.12	+1.59
Turnout		36,728	44.76	+2.32
Eligible voters		82,062		
New Democratic hold		Swing		–7.68
Source: Elections Ontario

2011 Ontario general election
Party	Candidate	Votes	%	±%
New Democratic	Andrea Horwath	20,586	61.33	+16.61
Liberal	Donna Tiqui-Shebib	5,861	17.46	–11.43
Progressive Conservative	Don Sheppard	4,421	13.17	–1.60
Green	Peter Ormond	1,249	3.72	–5.68
Libertarian	Robert Kuhlmann	634	1.89	–
Independent	Michael Baldasaro	268	0.80	–
Family Coalition	Steven Passmore	229	0.68	–0.75
Freedom	Chris Lawson	130	0.39	–
Communist	Anthony Gracey	122	0.36	–0.42
Reform	Robert Szajkowski	67	0.20	–
Total valid votes		33,567	99.48	
Total rejected, unmarked and declined ballots		177	0.52	–0.54
Turnout		33,744	42.43	–6.20
Eligible voters		79,524		
New Democratic hold		Swing		+14.02
Source: Elections Ontario

2007 Ontario general election
Party	Candidate	Votes	%	±%
New Democratic	Andrea Horwath	17,176	44.72	+11.27
Liberal	Steve Ruddick	11,096	28.89	–13.45
Progressive Conservative	Chris Robertson	5,673	14.77	–3.56
Green	Peter Ormond	3,610	9.40	–
Family Coalition	Lynne Scime	550	1.43	–
Communist	Bob Mann	302	0.79	–
Total valid votes		38,407	98.93	
Total rejected, unmarked and declined ballots		415	1.07	–0.61
Turnout		38,822	48.63	–6.08
Eligible voters		79,828		
New Democratic notional gain from Liberal		Swing		+12.36
Source: Elections Ontario

2003 general election redistributed results
Party	Vote	%
Liberal	15,116	42.34
New Democratic	11,942	33.45
Progressive Conservative	6,544	18.33
Others	2,099	5.88

=== Hamilton Centre (1926–1999) ===
1995 Ontario general election
Party	Candidate	Votes	%	±%	Expenditures
New Democratic	David Christopherson	8,012	36.81	–18.51	$40,543.33
Liberal	Filomena Tassi	7,322	33.64	+2.83	$34,483.85
Progressive Conservative	Angie Tomasic	5,723	26.30	+17.95	$18,222.88
Family Coalition	Tom Wigglesworth	376	1.73	+0.29	$1,548.28
Natural Law	Monique Poudrette	331	1.52	–	$0
Total valid votes		21,764	98.32		
Total rejected, unmarked and declined ballots		372	1.68	–0.05	
Turnout		22,136	54.71	–5.07	
Eligible voters		40,459			
New Democratic hold		Swing		–10.67	
Source: Elections Ontario

1990 Ontario general election
Party	Candidate	Votes	%	±%
New Democratic	David Christopherson	14,029	55.32	+16.43
Liberal	Lily Oddie	7,814	30.81	–20.51
Progressive Conservative	Graham F. Snelgrove	2,116	8.34	–1.44
Green	Brent J. A. Monkley	605	2.39	–
Libertarian	Julien M. Frost	429	1.69	–
Family Coalition	Jewell Wolgram	365	1.44	–
Total valid votes		25,358	98.27	
Total rejected, unmarked and declined ballots		446	1.73	+0.80
Turnout		25,804	59.78	+1.16
Eligible voters		43,166		
New Democratic gain from Liberal		Swing		+18.47
Source: Elections Ontario

1987 Ontario general election
Party	Candidate	Votes	%	±%
Liberal	Lily Oddie	13,636	51.32	+7.31
New Democratic	Brian Hinkley	10,333	38.89	–3.28
Progressive Conservative	Gerald Fruehwirth	2,600	9.79	–4.03
Total valid votes		26,569	99.08	
Total rejected ballots		248	0.92	+0.20
Turnout		26,817	58.62	+1.93
Eligible voters		45,745		
Liberal hold		Swing		+5.30
Source: Elections Ontario

1985 Ontario general election
Party	Candidate	Votes	%	±%
Liberal	Lily Oddie	9,184	44.01	+6.49
New Democratic	Mike Davison	8,800	42.17	+4.25
Progressive Conservative	John Ankers	2,883	13.82	–9.86
Total valid votes		20,867	99.27	
Total rejected ballots		153	0.73	–0.24
Turnout		21,020	56.69	+18.03
Eligible voters		37,076		
Liberal gain from New Democratic		Swing		+1.12
Source: Elections Ontario

Ontario provincial by-election, December 13, 1984 Resignation of Sheila Copps to run federally
Party	Candidate	Votes	%	±%
New Democratic	Mike Davison	5,308	37.92	+4.44
Liberal	Lily Oddie	5,253	37.52	–9.49
Progressive Conservative	Sandi Bell	3,314	23.67	+4.16
Communist	Kerry Wilson	124	0.89	–
Total valid votes		13,999	99.03	
Total rejected ballots		137	0.97	+0.24
Turnout		14,136	38.66	–16.75
Eligible voters		36,561		
New Democratic gain from Liberal		Swing		+6.97
Source: Elections Ontario

1981 Ontario general election
Party	Candidate	Votes	%	±%
Liberal	Sheila Copps	9,734	47.02	+9.22
New Democratic	Mike Davison	6,930	33.47	–4.39
Progressive Conservative	Brenda Riis	4,039	19.51	–3.96
Total valid votes		20,703	99.27	
Total rejected ballots		153	0.73	–1.04
Turnout		20,856	55.41	–2.71
Eligible voters		37,637		
Liberal gain from New Democratic		Swing		+6.80
Source: Elections Ontario

1977 Ontario general election
Party	Candidate	Votes	%	±%
New Democratic	Mike Davison	8,216	37.86	–0.57
Liberal	Sheila Copps	8,202	37.80	+2.14
Progressive Conservative	Bill McCulloch	5,092	23.47	–1.43
Communist	Art Walling	189	0.87	–0.14
Total valid votes		21,699	98.23	
Total rejected ballots		391	1.77	+0.85
Turnout		22,090	58.13	+1.56
Eligible voters		38,003		
New Democratic hold		Swing		–1.36
Source: Elections Ontario

1975 Ontario general election
Party	Candidate	Votes	%	±%
New Democratic	Mike Davison	8,114	38.43	+0.11
Liberal	Bob Monte	7,528	35.66	+5.50
Progressive Conservative	Maurice Carter	5,256	24.90	–6.63
Communist	Art Walling	214	1.01	–
Total valid votes		21,112	99.08	
Total rejected ballots		196	0.92	–0.59
Turnout		21,308	56.57	–5.04
Eligible voters		37,667		
New Democratic hold		Swing		–2.69
Source: Elections Ontario

1971 Ontario general election
Party	Candidate	Votes	%	±%
New Democratic	Norman Davison	8,018	38.32	–7.15
Progressive Conservative	David A. Stevenson	6,596	31.52	+10.70
Liberal	Ed Di Cesare	6,310	30.16	–3.55
Total valid votes		20,924	98.49	
Total rejected ballots		321	1.51	+0.06
Turnout		21,245	61.61	–0.28
Eligible voters		34,482		
New Democratic hold		Swing		–8.93
Source: Elections Ontario

1967 Ontario general election
Party	Candidate	Votes	%	±%
New Democratic	Norman Davison	8,922	45.47	+11.97
Liberal	Joseph Kostyk	6,613	33.70	+5.33
Progressive Conservative	Patricia Ford	4,086	20.82	–15.46
Total valid votes		19,621	98.55	
Total rejected ballots		289	1.45	+0.30
Turnout		19,910	61.89	+6.35
Eligible voters		32,168		
New Democratic gain from Progressive Conservative		Swing		+13.72
Source: Elections Ontario

1963 Ontario general election
Party	Candidate	Votes	%	±%
Progressive Conservative	Ada Pritchard	7,533	36.29	–3.47
New Democratic	William Scandlan	6,955	33.50	+0.91
Liberal	Jerry G. Ingrassia	5,890	28.37	+3.26
Communist	William Devine	382	1.84	–
Total valid votes		20,760	98.85	
Total rejected ballots		241	1.15	–0.65
Turnout		21,001	55.55	+5.57
Eligible voters		37,807		
Progressive Conservative hold		Swing		–2.19
Source: Elections Ontario

1959 Ontario general election
Party	Candidate	Votes	%	±%
Progressive Conservative	Bill Warrender	7,287	39.76	–4.96
Co-operative Commonwealth	William Scandlan	5,973	32.59	+1.56
Liberal	Dennis F. O'Leary	4,602	25.11	+5.54
Labor–Progressive	Malcolm Dougan	467	2.55	–2.13
Total valid votes		18,329	98.21	
Total rejected ballots		335	1.79	–0.73
Turnout		18,664	49.97	+2.89
Eligible voters		37,347		
Progressive Conservative hold		Swing		–3.26
Source: Elections Ontario

1955 Ontario general election
Party	Candidate	Votes	%	±%
Progressive Conservative	Bill Warrender	8,427	44.72	+2.28
Co-operative Commonwealth	Alfred H. Collingdon	5,847	31.03	–2.78
Liberal	May Elizabeth Webb	3,688	19.57	–4.19
Labor–Progressive	Donald A. Stewart	882	4.68	–
Total valid votes		18,844	97.48	
Total rejected ballots		488	2.52	+1.24
Turnout		19,332	47.08	–4.61
Eligible voters		41,062		
Progressive Conservative hold		Swing		+2.53
Source: Elections Ontario

1951 Ontario general election
Party	Candidate	Votes	%	±%
Progressive Conservative	Bill Warrender	7,753	42.44	+7.02
Co-operative Commonwealth	Robert Desmond Thornberry	6,176	33.80	–8.35
Liberal	Douglas B. Gordon	4,341	23.76	+1.33
Total valid votes		18,270	98.71	
Total rejected ballots		238	1.29	–0.21
Turnout		18,508	51.69	–14.98
Eligible voters		35,805		
Progressive Conservative gain from Co-operative Commonwealth		Swing		+7.68
Source: Elections Ontario

1948 Ontario general election
Party	Candidate	Votes	%	±%
Co-operative Commonwealth	Robert Desmond Thornberry	10,561	42.15	+8.48
Progressive Conservative	Vernon Charles Knowles	8,873	35.42	–0.81
Liberal	Francis Godfrey Dillon	5,619	22.43	–0.02
Total valid votes		25,053	98.51	
Total rejected ballots		380	1.49	+0.01
Turnout		25,433	66.67	–7.04
Eligible voters		38,148		
Co-operative Commonwealth gain from Progressive Conservative		Swing		+4.64
Source: Elections Ontario

1945 Ontario general election
Party	Candidate	Votes	%	±%
Progressive Conservative	Vernon Charles Knowles	9,091	36.23	+8.63
Co-operative Commonwealth	Robert Desmond Thornberry	8,451	33.68	–13.62
Liberal	John Newlands	5,633	22.45	–2.65
Labour Progressive	Harold Paikin	1,919	7.65	–
Total valid votes		25,094	98.52	
Total rejected ballots		378	1.48	+0.39
Turnout		25,472	73.71	+19.74
Eligible voters		34,558		
Progressive Conservative gain from Co-operative Commonwealth		Swing		+11.12
Source: Elections Ontario

1943 Ontario general election
Party	Candidate	Votes	%	±%
Co-operative Commonwealth	Robert Desmond Thornberry	8,592	47.30	–
Progressive Conservative	Charles Edward Purnell	5,014	27.60	–
Liberal	John Newlands	4,560	25.10	–52.49
Total valid votes		18,166	98.91	
Total rejected ballots		201	1.09	+1.09
Turnout		18,367	53.97	–
Eligible voters		34,032		
Co-operative Commonwealth gain from Liberal		Swing		–
Source: Elections Ontario

Ontario provincial by-election, March 2, 1938 Resignation of William Frederick Schwenger to become a judge
Party	Candidate	Votes	%	±%
Liberal	John Newlands	8,447	77.59	+22.62
Communist	Philip Luck	1,986	18.24	–
Socialist-Labour	Stewart Woods	454	4.17	+2.64
Total valid votes		10,887	100.00	
Total rejected ballots		–		
Turnout		10,887	–	–
Eligible voters				
Liberal hold		Swing		+11.31
Source: Elections Ontario

1937 Ontario general election
Party	Candidate	Votes	%	±%
Liberal	William Frederick Schwenger	11,959	54.97	+3.26
Conservative	B. William Hopkins	6,120	28.13	–8.77
Labor–Progressive	Robert Lorne McTavish	3,343	15.37	–
Socialist-Labour	Stewart Woods	333	1.53	–
Total valid votes		21,755	98.05	
Total rejected ballots		432	1.95	–0.57
Turnout		22,187	68.33	–2.01
Eligible voters		32,471		
Liberal hold		Swing		+6.02
Source: Elections Ontario

1934 Ontario general election
Party	Candidate	Votes	%	±%
Liberal	William Frederick Schwenger	11,250	51.71	+27.25
Conservative	Thomas William Jutten	8,028	36.90	–38.64
Co-operative Commonwealth	Robert D. Rowatt	2,478	11.39	–
Total valid votes		21,756	97.48	
Total rejected ballots		562	2.52	+1.16
Turnout		22,318	70.34	+23.90
Eligible voters		31,731		
Liberal gain from Conservative		Swing		+32.94
Source: Elections Ontario

1929 Ontario general election
Party	Candidate	Votes	%	±%
Conservative	Thomas William Jutten	7,568	75.54	–0.37
Liberal	Frank Morison	2,451	24.46	+3.59
Total valid votes		10,019	98.64	
Total rejected ballots		138	1.36	+0.44
Turnout		10,157	46.44	–15.87
Eligible voters		21,873		
Conservative hold		Swing		–1.98
Source: Elections Ontario

1926 Ontario general election
Party	Candidate	Votes	%
Conservative	Thomas William Jutten	9,784	75.90
Liberal	Harry D. Petrie	2,690	20.87
Labour	Albert Edward Smith	416	3.23
Total valid votes		12,890	99.09
Total rejected ballots		119	0.91
Turnout		13,009	62.30
Eligible voters		20,880	
Conservative pickup new district.			
Source: Elections Ontario

== 2007 electoral reform referendum ==
2007 Ontario electoral reform referendum
Side	Votes	%
First Past the Post	20,969	56.7
Mixed member proportional	16,027	43.3
Total valid votes	36,996	100.0

== See also ==
- List of Ontario provincial electoral districts
- Canadian provincial electoral districts
