= Robin Lennox =

Canadian politician and activist

Robin Lennox MPP
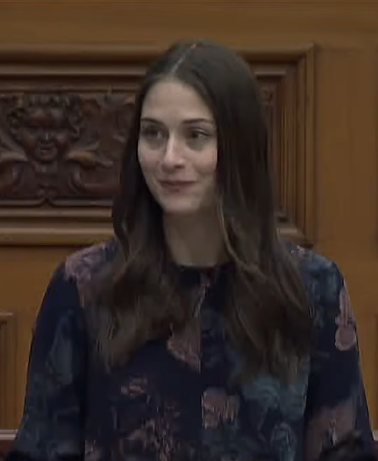
- Lennox in 2025

Member of the Ontario Provincial Parliament for Hamilton Centre
- Incumbent
- Assumed office February 27, 2025
- Preceded by: Sarah Jama

Personal details
- Party: Ontario New Democratic
- Education: McMaster University (M.D., 2015)
- Profession: Family physician

Robin Barbara Bateman Lennox is a Canadian physician and politician who was elected as a member of Provincial Parliament (MPP) in the 2025 Ontario general election. A member of the Ontario New Democratic Party (NDP), Lennox represents Hamilton Centre in the Legislative Assembly. Prior to entering politics, Lennox practised family medicine.

== Medical career ==
Lennox graduated from the DeGroote School of Medicine at McMaster University in 2015 and completed her residency in family medicine in 2017. Lennox specializes in addiction medicine. She has worked with the Shelter Health Network and was medical director for the supervised consumption site at the YWCA, as well as co-head of the substance use service at St. Joseph's Healthcare Hamilton. She served on the City of Hamilton's public health sub-committee.

== Political career ==
Lennox was nominated to be the Ontario NDP candidate in Hamilton Centre on February 3, 2025, shortly before the election. Hamilton Centre was the riding of former NDP leader Andrea Horwath, who went on to become Mayor of Hamilton. In the general election, she defeated incumbent Sarah Jama, who won the riding for the NDP in a by-election in 2023. Jama ran as an independent, after being removed from the party.

With the Ontario NDP Caucus, Lennox is the Shadow Minister for Mental Health and Addiction, with responsibility for Primary Care. She also serves as a member of the Social Policy Committee.

As an advocate for universal pharmacare, Lennox put forward a Private Members' Motion in 2025 to expand the Ontario Drug Benefit eligibility to include all Ontarians, regardless of age or employment status. Lennox also tabled legislation including the Save a Life Act (Bill 121) to co-locate naloxone kits with automated external defibrillators in public spaces.

== Electoral record ==
2025 Ontario general election: Hamilton Centre
Party	Candidate	Votes	%	±%	Expenditures
New Democratic	Robin Lennox	12,839	38.36	–15.86	$91,418
Liberal	Eileen Walker	7,132	21.31	+1.05	$23,776
Progressive Conservative	Sarah Bokhari	6,331	18.92	+3.53	$31,595
Independent	Sarah Jama	4,977	14.87	N/A	$123,287
Green	Lucia Iannantuono	1,642	4.91	–1.99	$6,292
New Blue	Mitch Novosad	441	1.32	+0.47	$0
Independent	Nathalie Xian Yi Yan	107	0.32	+0.03	$0
Total valid votes/expense limit		33,469	99.66	+0.18	$127,836
Total rejected, unmarked, and declined ballots		113	0.34	–0.18	
Turnout		33,582	42.57	+20.60	
Eligible voters		78,879			
New Democratic gain from Independent		Swing		–8.46	
Source: Elections Ontario
