= Mike Davison (politician) =

Canadian politician

Ontario MPP
- In office 1984–1985
- Preceded by: Sheila Copps
- Succeeded by: Lily Munro
- Constituency: Hamilton Centre
- In office 1975–1981
- Preceded by: Norm Davison
- Succeeded by: Sheila Copps
- Constituency: Hamilton Centre

Personal details
- Born: March 31, 1950 (age 76) Hamilton, Ontario
- Party: New Democrat
- Occupation: Journalist

Michael Norman Davison (born March 31, 1950) is a former politician in Ontario, Canada. He was a New Democratic member in the Legislative Assembly of Ontario from 1975 to 1981 and again from 1984 to 1985 who represented the riding of Hamilton Centre.

== Background ==
Davison was born in Hamilton, Ontario, and attended Hamilton Collegiate Institute.

== Politics ==
He was elected to the Ontario legislature in the 1975 provincial election, succeeding his father Norm Davison in Hamilton Centre. He was re-elected over Liberal candidate Sheila Copps by 14 votes in the 1977 election. A recount was ordered which confirmed the win for Davison. In 1981, Davison lost to Copps in a rematch.

Davison won a seat on the Hamilton, Ontario City Council in 1982. He returned to the provincial politics when he won a by-election on December 13, 1984 which was held to replace Copps who moved on to Federal politics. He defeated Liberal candidate Lily Munro by 100 votes. Munro requested a recount which confirmed Davison's win by a narrow margin of 55 votes. He never actually returned to sit in the legislature, however, as it was not convened before the writs were dropped five months later. In the 1985 election Davison lost to Oddie in a rematch by 384 votes.

He tried to regain a Hamilton council seat again in November 1985, but failed in his attempt.

== Later life ==
He opened a consulting firm after leaving politics. Davison wrote a column for the Hamilton Spectator newspaper until it was cancelled in 2002. Following his column's cancellation, he became a political commentator for CHCH News and, in 2003, sought appointment to the Hamilton Police Services Board.

In 2004, Davison was arrested on three counts of criminal harassment and one count of attempting to lure a 16-year-old girl into prostitution. He rejected the terms of his bail agreement in July 2004, and chose to remain in jail during the pre-trial period. A number of Davison's former associates indicated that they had lost touch with him prior to his arrest, and sometimes saw him "wandering downtown streets" in an aimless manner. Future HWDSB Trustee Bob Barlow, then active in local NDP politics, noted that Davison had gone to Andrea Horwath's by-election headquarters and made a number of strange statements. "It was almost like a fantasyland. That's not the Mike I know. I thought that's odd," Barlow told the Hamilton Spectator. Political columnist Eric Dowd wrote that heavy drinking played a significant role in Davison's downfall.

Davison eventually pleaded guilty, and was given a conditional discharge and probation. An addiction to alcohol was a contributing factor.
