= Thomas William Jutten =

Canadian politician

MPP for Hamilton Centre
- In office 1926–1934
- Preceded by: new riding
- Succeeded by: William Frederick Schwenger

Mayor of Hamilton, Ontario
- In office 1923–1925
- Preceded by: George Charles Coppley
- Succeeded by: Freeman Ferrier Treleaven

Personal details
- Born: June 15, 1861 London, England
- Died: April 10, 1955 (aged 93)
- Party: Conservative
- Domestic partner: Suzanne Keil

Thomas William Jutten (June 15, 1861 – April 10, 1955) was a Canadian politician.

Born in London, England, Jutten moved to Canada with his family in 1871, settling in Hamilton, Ontario. In 1881, he married Suzanne Keil. He owned a boatbuilding business. Juttern served as an alderman from 1906 to 1913 and on the Board of Control from 1914 to 1920. In 1921, he unsuccessfully ran for mayor of the city, losing to George Charles Coppley. He tried again in 1923 and was elected. He served in this post until 1925.

In 1926, he became the Conservative Member of Provincial Parliament for Hamilton Centre and served until he was defeated in 1934.
