= Hamilton Incline Railway =

Funicular railway in Hamilton, Ontario

Hamilton Incline Railway (Wentworth Street Incline Railway/Mount Hamilton Railway)

Overview
- Locale: Hamilton, Ontario, Canada
- Transit type: Funicular railway
- Number of stations: 2

Operation
- Began operation: 1895
- Ended operation: 1936
- Operator: The Peninsula Hotels

Technical
- System length: 721 feet (220 m)
- Track gauge: 12 ft 1 1/2 in (3,696 mm)

The Mount Hamilton Incline Railway was a funicular railway in Hamilton, Ontario, Canada, climbing the Niagara Escarpment. It opened August 26, 1895 in Hamilton, Ontario. It was the second Hamilton funicular, after the Hamilton and Barton.

The site was on the concession road which became Wentworth Street, climbing the Niagara Escarpment, though it remains impassible to this day. In 1906 a new owner renamed it Wentworth Incline Railway (although many city residents called it the East-End Incline.

The system had two tracks with two car operation with second generation cars used after 1910. The original cars were wood. The cars were quite wide (20.5 feet by 30 feet), so that small streetcars could have been carried, but this was never followed through. A number of structures were associated with the incline. The Superintendent's home and Ticket Office were at the lower level. The Engineer's home with the Engine house and Boiler house behind were at the upper level, 90 degrees from the line of the track.

The incline was operated by two horizontal steam engines of 75 horsepower, working a single drum. The cable of the west car went over the top of the drum and the east cable went under the drum, with no break in the cable. There was only one working cable of 1.625 inches (41.3 mm) but there was a safety cable identical to it which worked the huge safety brake under the upper landing. The standard operation allowed trips of 120 seconds. The cable was replaced every five years.

On April 24, 1906 the Engineer's house burned down, with damage to the engine house. In November 1913 a landslide took out half the track. The incline was rebuilt on a steel trestle with new steel cars, though the 1910 passenger shelters were still in use. In 1915 the steam engines were retired and a new electric motor of 180 hp (with a spare) was installed with four drums (so it could handled the working and safety cables better) located in a new building on the south side of Mountain Park Ave. Two tunnels carried the cables to the upper platform then over the sheaves. The upgrade allowed trips of 90 seconds. The old steam engines and boilers were sold for scrap (in the middle of The Great War) but the buildings remained.

Many proposals were put forth about getting the incline over or under the two steam railway lines at the bottom, but they never came to pass. A double lane road was built by the City of Hamilton which had to duck beneath the track in 1926, but it also removed 80% of the incline's traffic. The railway stopped running in 1936 when the company went bankrupt. The historic structure was vandalized and finally demolished 1949-50. The new electric motor house was sold in 1949 and converted to small apartments. This was demolished in 1983 and a new condo built, called Incline Place.

Today, the site of the railway is covered by trees, and the Wentworth Stairs connecting from Wentworth Street South and Charlton Avenue East up to Sherman Access and then again up to Upper Wentworth Street and Mountain Park Avenue. Most of these stairs are built on the original trestle foundations (1914). There are 498 steps, and they are informally rated as the most difficult of the Hamilton stairs.

== See also ==
- List of funicular railways
- List of Ontario railways
