= Chronic care =

Medical care addressing long-term illness

Chronic care refers to medical care which addresses pre-existing or long-term illness, as opposed to acute care which is concerned with short term or severe illness of brief duration. Chronic medical conditions include asthma, diabetes, emphysema, chronic bronchitis, congestive heart disease, cirrhosis of the liver, hypertension and depression. Without effective treatment chronic conditions may lead to disability.

The incidence of chronic disease has increased as mortality rates have decreased. It is estimated that by 2030 half of the population of the US will have one or more chronic conditions.

According to the CDC, 6 out of 10 adults in the U.S. are managing at least one chronic disease and 42% of adults have two or more chronic conditions.

Conditions, injuries and diseases which were previously fatal can now be treated with chronic care. Chronic care aims to maintain wellness by keeping symptoms in remission while balancing treatment regimes and quality of life. Many of the core functions of primary health care are central to chronic care. Chronic care is complex in nature because it may extend over a pro-longed period of time, requires input from a diverse set of health professionals, various medications and possibly monitoring equipment.

== Policy making ==
According to 2008 figures from the Centers for Disease Control and Prevention chronic medical care accounts for more than 75% of health care spending in the US. In response to the increased government expenditure in dealing with chronic care policy makers are searching for effective interventions and strategies. These strategies can broadly be described within four categories. These are disease prevention and early detection, new providers, settings and qualifications, disease management programs and integrated care models.

== Challenges ==
One of the major problems from a health care system which is poorly coordinated for people with chronic conditions is the incidence of patients receiving conflicting advice from different providers. Patients will often be given prescriptions for medication that adversely interact with one another. One recent study estimated that more than 20% of older patients in the US took at least one medication which could negatively impact another condition. This is referred to as therapeutic competition.

Effective chronic care requires an information platform to track patients' status and ensure appropriate treatments are given.

There is a recognised gap between treatment guidelines and current practice for chronic care. Individualised treatment plans are critical in treating chronic conditions because patients will place varying important on health outcomes. For example, some patients will fore-go complex, inconvenient medication regimes at the expense of quality of life.

=== Multiple conditions ===
One of the greatest challenges in this field of health care is dealing with the co-existence of multiple long-term conditions, also known as multimorbidity. There are few incentives within current health care systems to coordinate care across multiple providers and varying services. A 2001 survey by Mathematica Policy Research found that physicians feel they have inadequate training to deal with multiple chronic conditions. An increase in the number of chronic conditions correlates with an increase in the number of inappropriate hospitalizations. Self-management can be challenging because recommended activities for one condition may be made difficult because of another condition.

== Approach ==
Chronic care is a patient-based approach to provide chronically ill patients with the knowledge and resources to help them better understand their conditions and to help them to adhere with treatment for better outcomes. Chronic care patients may require the services of a variety of care providers, including dietitians, nutritionists, occupational therapists, nurses, behavioral care, pain management, surgery, and pastoral care. Working in collaboration with the patient, the chronic care provider coordinates care these and other specialist providers. Additionally, the patient may require palliative or hospice care, especially at end of life.

== See also ==
- Chronic pain
