= Niagara Escarpment =

Escarpment in Canada and the United States

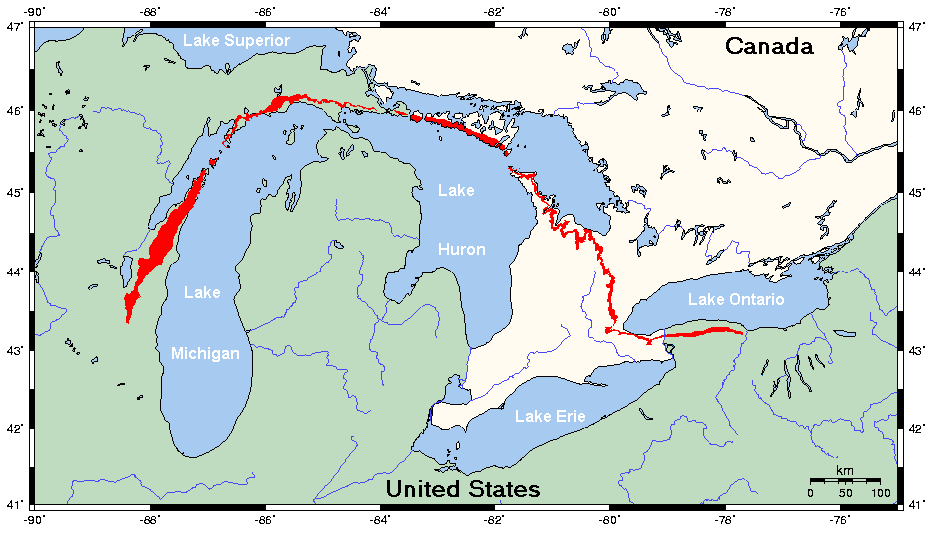
Niagara Escarpment (in red)

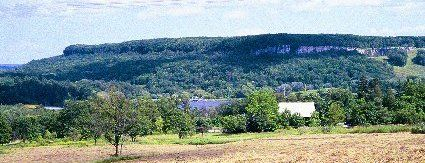
Rattlesnake Point near Milton, Ontario

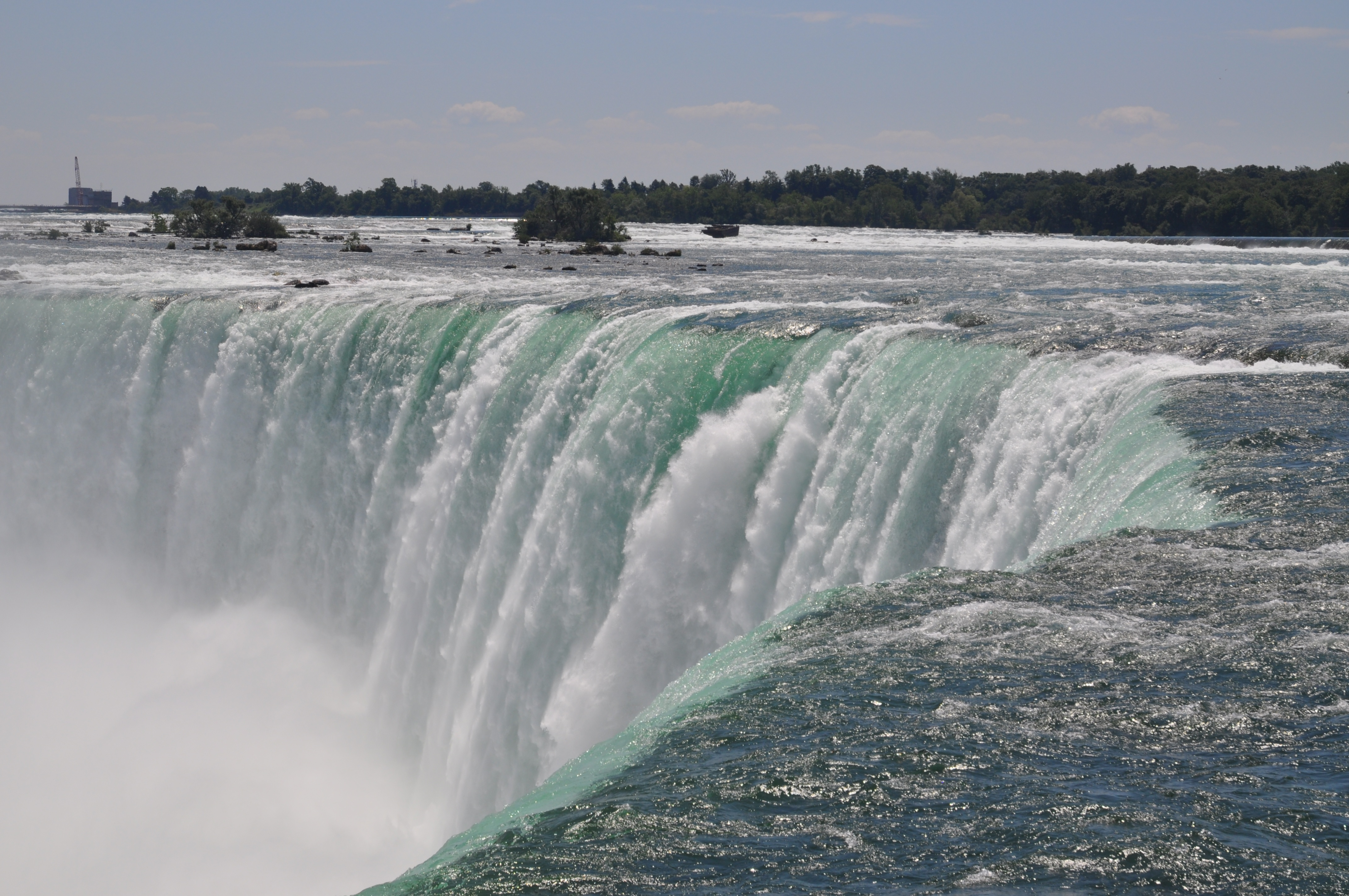
The Niagara River has carved the Niagara Gorge through the Niagara Escarpment over thousands of years.

The Niagara Escarpment is an approximately 1,050-kilometre-long (650-mile) discontinuous, arc-shaped, but generally northward-facing escarpment, or cuesta, in Canada and the United States. The escarpment begins south of Lake Ontario and circumscribes the top of the Great Lakes Basin running from New York through Ontario, Michigan, and Wisconsin. The escarpment is the cliff over which the Niagara River plunges at Niagara Falls, for which it is named.

The escarpment is a UNESCO World Biosphere Reserve. The reserve has the oldest forest ecosystem and trees in eastern North America.

The Niagara Escarpment is not a fault line but the result of unequal erosion. The cliff-forming rock exposed along the escarpment is a belt of limestone and dolomite of the Lockport Formation of Silurian age. The Niagara Escarpment is the most prominent of several escarpments formed in the bedrock of the Great Lakes Basin. For example, the Onondaga Formation, which runs in a parallel outcrop belt just to the south of the Lockport Formation through western New York and southern Ontario, forms a separate escarpment. The Niagara Escarpment traces, and in part shapes, the individual basins and landforms of Lake Ontario, Lake Huron, and Lake Michigan.

In Rochester, New York, the Genesee River flows through the city in three waterfalls over the scarp face. The escarpment thence runs westward to the Niagara River, forming a deep gorge north of Niagara Falls, which itself cascades over the scarp face. In Southern Ontario, it spans the Niagara Peninsula, closely following the Lake Ontario shore through the cities of St. Catharines and Hamilton, where it takes a sharp turn north in the town of Milton toward Georgian Bay. It then follows the Georgian Bay shore northwestwards to form the spine of the Bruce Peninsula and Manitoulin Island, as well as several smaller islands in northern Lake Huron, where it turns westwards into the Upper Peninsula of northern Michigan, south of Sault Ste. Marie. It extends down the Garden Peninsula and Potawatomi Islands into Wisconsin following the Door Peninsula and then continues more inland from the western coast of Lake Michigan until ending in the southeastern corner of Dodge County north of Chicago, Illinois.

== Formation ==
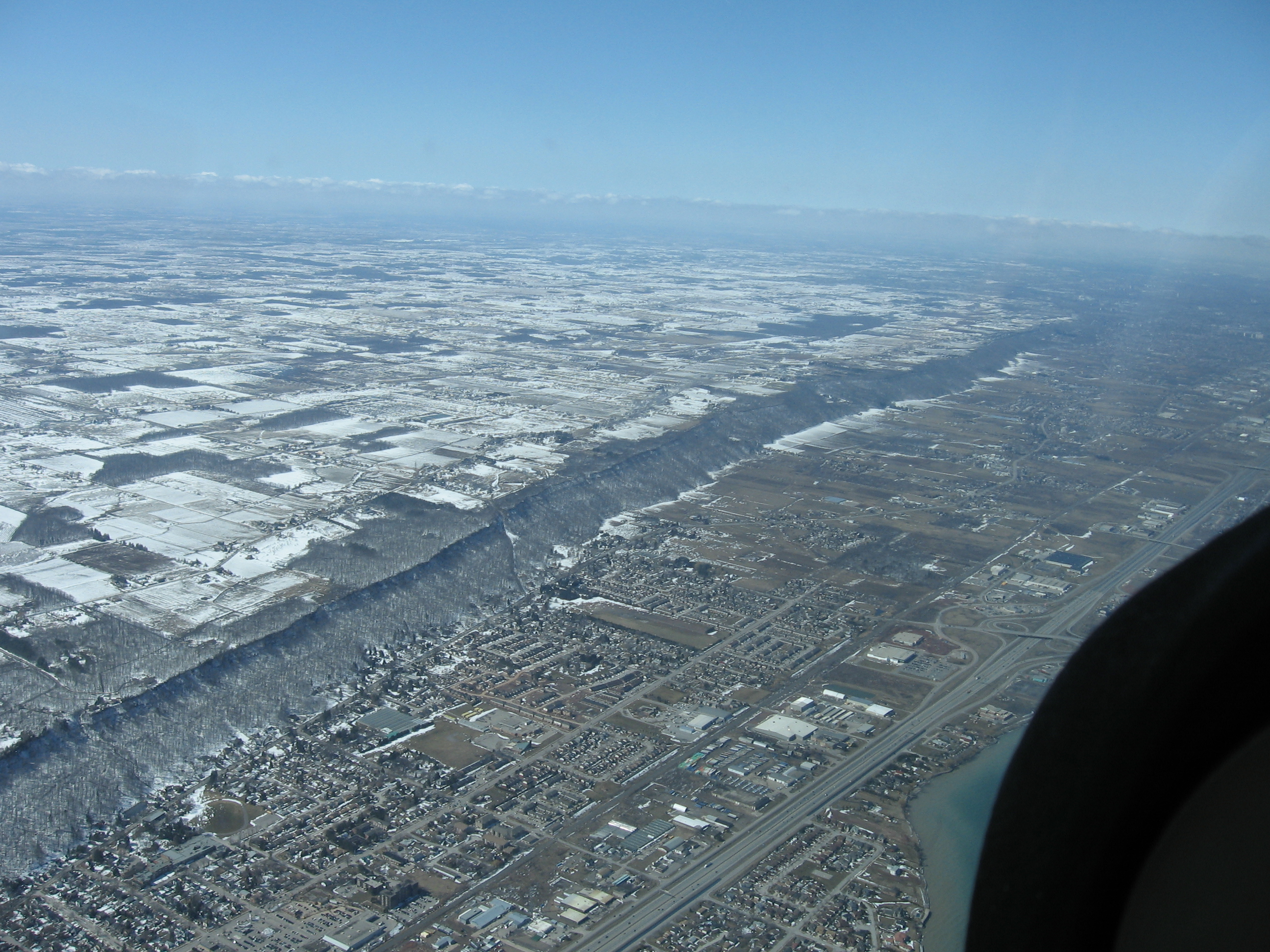
Niagara Escarpment in Grimsby, Ontario, from about 1060 metres (3,500 feet) above sea level

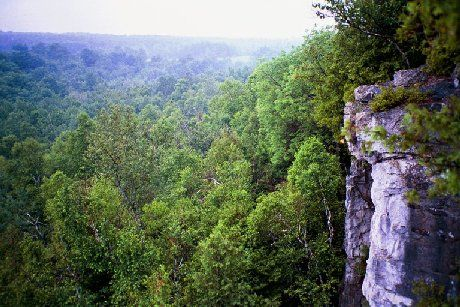
A section of escarpment cliff, seen from the Bruce Trail in Ontario

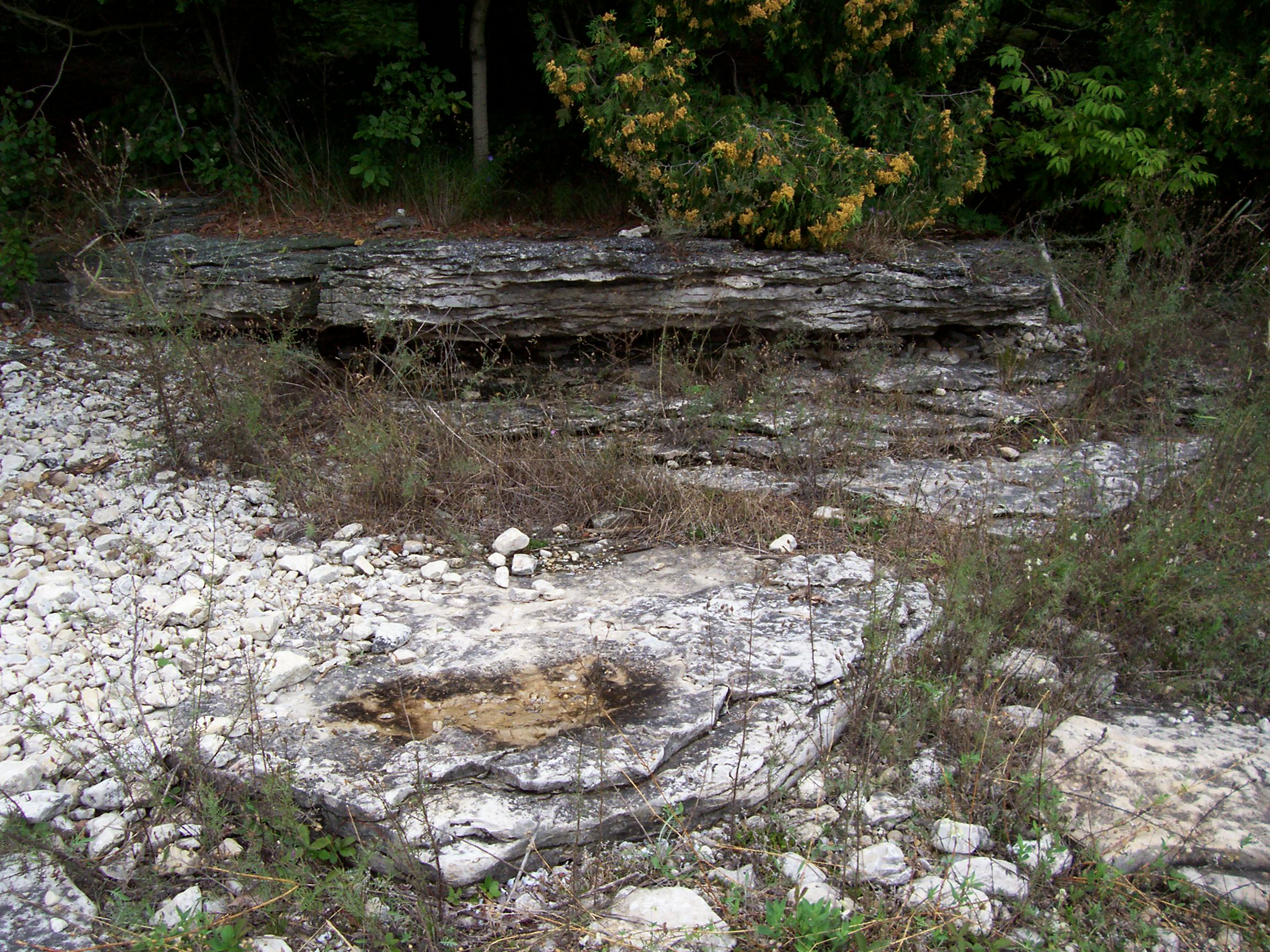
Outcropping of the escarpment in Door County, Wisconsin approximately 10 feet (3 m) from Lake Michigan

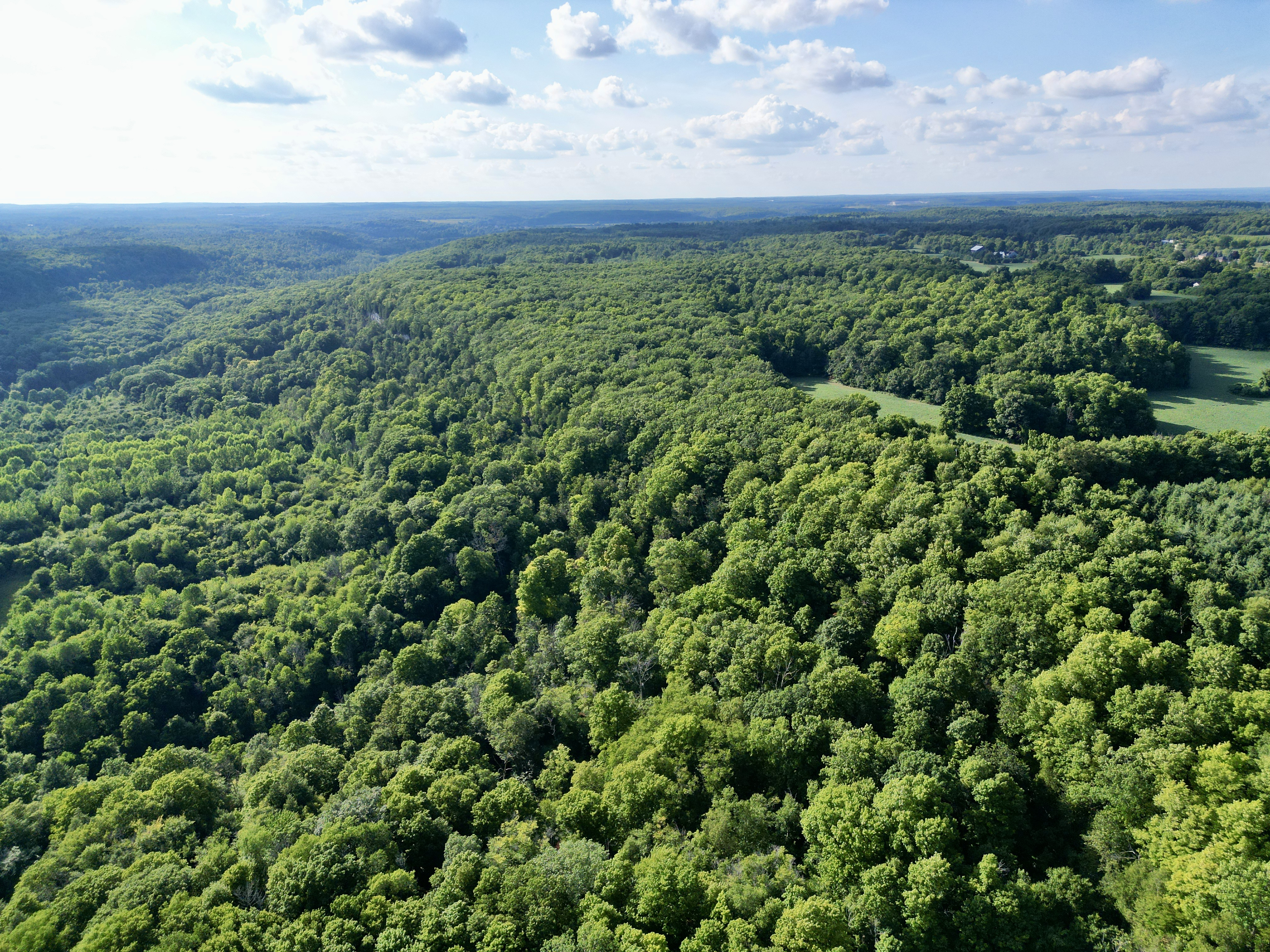
Niagara Escarpment from above Rattlesnake Point, Milton, Ontario

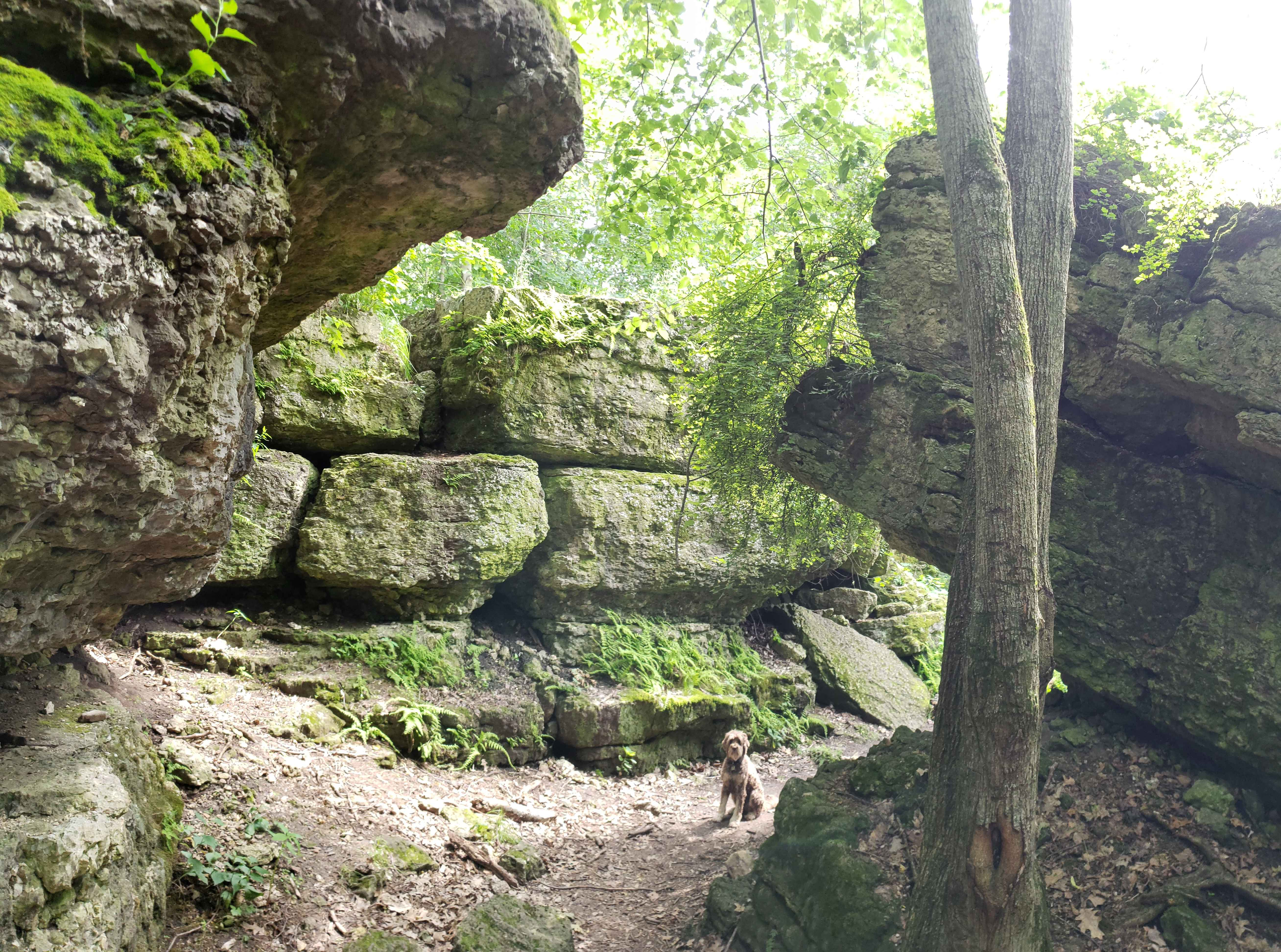
Exposure of the escarpment at Dodge County Ledge Park, Dodge County, Wisconsin.

Study of rock exposures and drillholes demonstrates that no displacement of the rock layers occurs at the escarpment, which is not a fault line but the result of unequal erosion. The escarpment's caprock is dolomitic limestone, also known as dolostone, which is more resistant and overlies weaker, more easily eroded shale as a weathering-resistant "cap". The escarpment formed over millions of years through a process of differential erosion of these rocks of different hardnesses. Through time the soft rocks weather away or erode by the action of streams. The gradual removal of the soft rocks undercuts the resistant caprock, leaving a cliff or escarpment. The erosional process is most readily seen at Niagara Falls, where the river has quickened the process. It can also be seen at the three waterfalls of the Genesee River at Rochester (additional resistant rock layers make more than one escarpment in some places). Also, in some places thick glacial deposits, such as the Oak Ridges Moraine, conceal the Niagara Escarpment, such as north of Georgetown, Ontario, where it actually continues under glacial till and reappears farther north.

The dolomite cap was laid down as sediment on the floor of a marine environment. In Michigan, behind (south of) the escarpment, the cuesta capstone slopes gently to form a wide basin, the floor of an Ordovician-Silurian-age tropical sea. (The escarpment is essentially the remnant shoreline of that sea.) There the constant deposition of minute shells and fragments of biologically generated calcium carbonate, mixed with sediment washed in by erosion of the virtually lifeless landmasses, eventually formed a limestone layer. During the Silurian period, some magnesium substituted for some of the calcium in the carbonates, slowly forming harder dolomite layers in the same fashion. This dolomite basin contains Lakes Michigan, Huron, and Erie. Worldwide sea levels were at their all-time maximum in the Ordovician; as the sea retreated, erosion inevitably began.

== Human geography ==
The Niagara Escarpment was the steepest part of the historic Niagara Portage. In 1763 Captain John Montresor constructed a gravity railway up the escarpment to ease portaging, creating the first railroad in North America.

The escarpment was a major obstacle in the construction of the Erie Canal in New York and was traversed by a series of locks; the community which grew up at the site thus became known as Lockport, New York.

The Welland Canal allows ships to traverse the escarpment between Lake Erie and Lake Ontario on the Niagara Peninsula of Ontario. The canal also allowed Sea Lamprey, an invasive species native to Northern Atlantic Ocean, to enter Lake Erie and became a concern for the lake's ecosystem.

In southern Ontario, the Bruce Trail runs the length of the escarpment from Queenston on the Niagara River to Tobermory on the Bruce Peninsula. Highway 401, Canada's busiest, also crosses the Niagara Escarpment, beginning its long descent through rolling hills, farmland, and towns west of Milton. Rock exposed on the face of the escarpment can be seen along Highway 26 from Owen Sound eastwards towards Meaford, Ontario.

Hamilton, Ontario is on the escarpment in such a way that the north end of the city is below and the south part above. Commonly referred to as "The Mountain" by its residents, many roads or "mountain accesses" join the urban core below with the suburban expansion above. From 1892 to 1936, the Hamilton Incline Railway transported people up and down "The Mountain."

High Cliff State Park in Wisconsin shows how modern and prehistoric humans used the escarpment for not only cultural reasons, but economic gains, as well. A number of different animal and geometric effigy mounds and the remains of an early 20th-century limestone quarry and kiln are within the park.

The relief and exposed edge are used by several wind farms stretching from Pipe to Brownsville in Wisconsin. Wind speeds average 18 miles per hour (about 29 km/h) along this stretch.

The Niagara Escarpment is a prominent Wisconsin feature in Dodge County, southwest of Fond du Lac, Wisconsin; it is known there as "The Ledge" and is in Ledge County Park between Horicon and Mayville, Wisconsin. Some local organizations take their name from it, including The Ledgers, the sports teams at St. Mary's Springs Academy, which is perched on the side of the escarpment.

Many resorts and ski areas in Ontario, Michigan, Wisconsin, and New York are along the escarpment.

== Vineyard land ==
Niagara County, New York, near the eastern end of the escarpment, is the site of the 18,000 acres (7,284 ha) Niagara Escarpment AVA (American Viticultural Area). Wines produced in this region include traditional grape varieties such as Merlot, Cabernet Franc, Cabernet Sauvignon, Chardonnay, and Riesling, and fruit wines.

Ontario's Niagara Peninsula is the site of the largest wine-producing appellation (region) in Canada. Cool-climate varieties such as Riesling, Chardonnay, Gamay Noir, Pinot Noir, and Cabernet Franc are among the more than 30 varietals produced across 13,600 hectares (33,606 acres). Three subappellations lie along the benchlands of the Niagara Escarpment: Short Hills Bench, Twenty Mile Bench, and Beamsville Bench.

Northeastern Wisconsin, at the western end of the escarpment, is the site of the 3,800-square-mile (9,800 km^{2}) Wisconsin Ledge AVA. Most of the region's vineyards lie upon the escarpment's eastern-facing slope that rises gently upward from the shores of Lake Michigan to the top of the Ledge, before dropping sharply off into Green Bay, and benefit greatly from constant air movement from Lake Michigan, which stores warmth during the summer. The presence of the lake produces a vacuum of sorts during the growing season: warm air over the lake rises, sucking colder air off the land and creating offshore breezes. Cold air cannot settle over the vineyards and a constant flow of warmer air makes the growing season here longer than in other parts of the state. The escarpment's glacial soils are made up of gravel, sand, and clay over limestone bedrock. An aquifer provides mineral-rich ground water to the vines, encouraging deep root growth.

== World Biosphere Reserve ==
In February 1990, the Niagara Escarpment was a designated World Biosphere Reserve by UNESCO, making it one of 12 in Canada. Development and land use on and adjacent to the escarpment is regulated by the Niagara Escarpment Commission, an agency of the Ontario government.

Cliffs along the scarp face have the oldest forest ecosystem in eastern North America. The oldest tree in Ontario is an eastern white cedar from 688 AD. The oldest known tree in Wisconsin, a 1,300 year-old eastern white cedar, was found in Brown County.

== See also ==
- Bayshore Blufflands
- Canadian Shield
- Cheltenham Badlands
- Ontario Greenbelt
- Golden Horseshoe
- List of escarpments
- Hamilton Mountain
