= List of mayors of Hamilton, Ontario =

List of mayors of Hamilton

Mayor of Hamilton
- Flag of Hamilton

- Incumbent; Keanin Loomis since November 15, 2026
- Style: His Worship; Mayor (informal)
- Member of: City Council
- Reports to: Hamilton City Council
- Residence: Hamilton, Ontario
- Seat: Hamilton City Hall
- Appointer: Directly elected by residents of Hamilton
- Term length: Four years, renewable
- Inaugural holder: Colin Campbell Ferrie
- Formation: 1847; 179 years ago
- Website: www.hamilton.ca

The mayor of Hamilton is head of Hamilton City Council. The current mayor is Keanin Loomis.

== Indirectly-elected mayors, 1847 to 1858 ==
List of Indirectly-elected Mayors of Hamilton, Ontario from 1847 to 1859
No.	Photo	Name (Birth–Death)	Term	Council Election
1	Lithograph of Colin Campbell Ferrie	Colin Campbell Ferrie (1808–1856)	1847	1847
2		George Sylvester Tiffany (1805–1856)	1848	1848
3		William L. Distin (1789–1879)	1849	1849
4	John Fisher	John Fisher (1806–1882)	1850	1850
5		John Rose Holden (1821–1879)	1851	1851
6		Nehemiah Ford (?) (Note: Ford's birth and death years are unknown.)	1852	1852
7		William G. Kerr (1814/1815-1861)	1853	1853
8		James Cummings (1815–1894)	January to March 1854	1854
9		Charles Magill (1816–1898)	April 1854 to December 1855	1854 1855
10		James Cummings (1815–1894)	1856	1856
11		John Francis Moore (1816–1870)	1857	1857
12		George Hamilton Mills (1827–1901)	1858	1858

== Mayors of the City of Hamilton (pre-amalgamation), 1859 to 2000 ==
List of Mayors of Hamilton, Ontario from 1859 to 2000
No.	Photo	Name (Birth–Death)	Term	Election
13		Henry McKinstry (1805–1871)	1859–1861	1859 1860 1861
14		Robert McElroy (?)	1862–1864	1862 1863 1864
15		Charles Magill (1816–1898)	1865–1866	1865 1866
16		Benjamin Ernest Charlton (1835–1901)	1867	1867
17		Hutchison Clark (1806–1877)	1868	1868
18		James Edwin O'Reilly (1833–1907)	1869	1869
19		George Murison (1819–1889)	1870	1870
20		Daniel Black Chisholm (1832–1898)	1871–1872	1871 1872
21		Benjamin Ernest Charlton (1835–1901)	1873–1874	1873 1874
22		George Roach (?)	1875–1876	1875 1876
23		Francis Edwin Kilvert (1838–1910)	1877–1878	1877 1878
24		James Edwin O'Reilly (1833–1907)	1879–1881	1879 1880 1881
25		Charles Magill (1816–1898)	1882–1883	1882 1883
26		John James Mason (1842–1903)	1884–1885	1884 1885
27		Alexander McKay (1843–1912)	1886–1887	1886 1887
28		William Doran (1834–1903)	1888–1889	1888 1889
29		David McLellan (1841–1892)	1890–1891	1890 1891
30		Peter Campbell Blaicher (1835–1900)	1892–1893	1892 1893
31	Alexander David Stewart	Alexander David Stewart (1852–1899)	1894–1895	1894 1895
32		George Elias Tuckett (1835–1900)	1896	1896
33		Edward Alexander Colquhoun (1844–1904)	1897–1898	1897 1898
34		James Vernall Teetzel (1853–1926)	1899–1900	1899 1900
35	John Strathearn Hendrie	John Strathearn Hendrie (1857–1923)	1901–1902	1901 1902
36		Wellington Jeffers Morden (1837–1928)	1903–1904	1903 1904
37		Sanford Dennis Biggar (1861–1920)	1905–1906	1905 1906
38		Thomas Joseph Stewart (1848–1926)	1907–1908	1907 1908
39		John Inglis McLaren (1865–1948)	1909–1910	1909 1910
40		George Harmon Lees (1860–1936)	1911–1912	1911 1912
41		John Allan (1856–1922)	1913–1914	1913 1914
42		Chester Samuel Walters (1878–1958)	1915–1916	1915 1916
43		Charles Goodenough Booker (1859–1926)	1917–1920	1917 1918 1919 1920
44		George Charles Coppley (1858–1936)	1921–1922	1921 1922
45		Thomas William Jutten (1861–1955)	1923–1925	1923 January 1924 (Note: A referendum was held during the January 1, 1924 election which resulted in the electors of Hamilton approving a change in the municipal election date to early December. Subsequent elections were held early December with inaugurations in early January of the following year.) December 1924
46		Freeman Ferrier Treleaven (1884–1952)	1926–1927	1925 1926
47		William Burton (1888–1944)	1928–1929	1927 1928
48		John Peebles (1872–1948)	1930–1933	1929 1930 1931 1932
49		Herbert Earl Wilton (1869–1937)	1934–1935	1933 1934
50		William Robert Morrison (1878–1947)	1936–1943	1935 1936 1937 1938 1939 1940 1941 1942
51	Sam Lawrence in 1937	Samuel Lawrence (1879–1959)	1944–1949	1943 1944 1945 1946 1947 1948
52		Lloyd Douglas Jackson (1888–1973)	1950–1962	1949 1950 1951 1952 1953 1954 (Note: Following 1954, municipal terms were extended to two-years.) 1956 1958 1960
53		Victor Kennedy Copps (1919–1988)	1963–1976	1962 1964 1966 1968 1970 1972 1973 (Note: A special election was held in 1973 upon the creation of the Region of Hamilton-Wentworth.) 1976
54		Vince Agro (1936–2020)	1976–1977 (as acting mayor) (Note: Agro served as acting mayor following Copps' incapacitation due to a heart attack but lost an election-bid to serve a full term in 1976.)	–
55		Jack MacDonald (1927–2010)	1977–1980	1976 1978
56		Bill Powell (1907–1992)	1981–1982	1980
57		Bob Morrow (1946–2018)	1983–2000	1982 (Note: Municipal terms were extended to three years in 1982.) 1985 1988 1991 1994 1997

== Mayors of the City of Hamilton, 2000–present ==
List of Mayors of Hamilton, Ontario from 2000 to the present
No.	Photo	Name (Birth–Death)	Term	Election
58		Robert E. Wade (1933–2023)	2000–2003	2000
59		Larry Di Ianni (born 1948)	2003–2006	2003
60	Eisenberger in 2010	Fred Eisenberger (born 1952)	2006–2010	2006
61	Bratina in 2010	Bob Bratina (born 1944)	2010–2014	2010
62	Eisenberger in 2017	Fred Eisenberger (born 1952)	2014–2022	2014 2018
63	Eisenberger in 2022	Andrea Horwath (born 1962)	2022–2026	2022
64	Loomis in 2026	Keanin Loomis (born 1975)	2026–	2026
