= Hamilton Cemetery =

Cemetery in Hamilton, Ontario, Canada

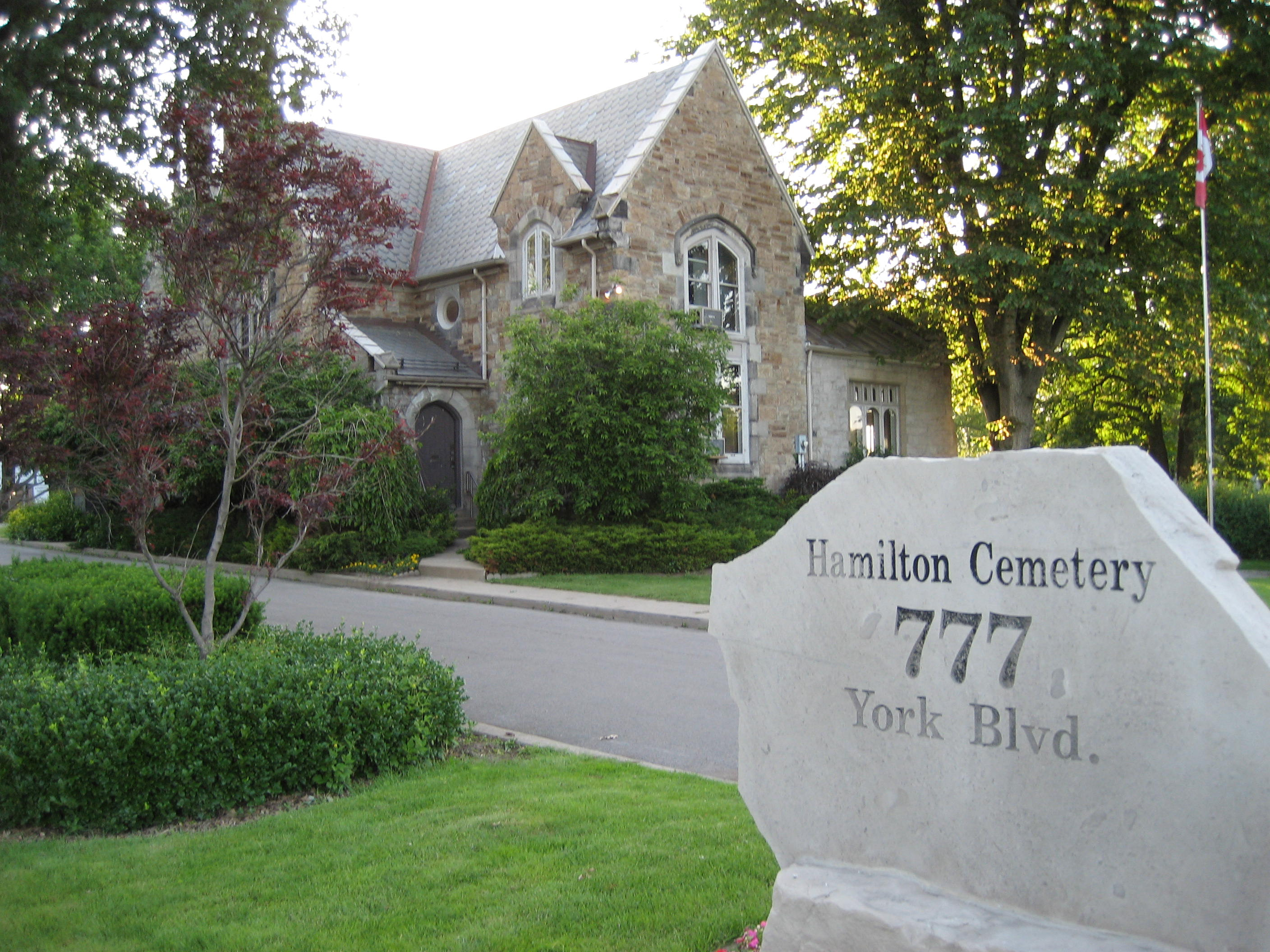
- Entrance
- Interactive map of Hamilton Cemetery

Details
- Established: 1847
- Location: 777 York Boulevard, Hamilton, Ontario
- Country: Canada
- Coordinates: 43°16′36″N 79°53′25″W
- Type: Cemetery
- Owned by: Hamilton, Ontario
- Size: ~100 acres
- No. of graves: 21500
- No. of interments: ~20
- No. of cremations: ~30
- Find a Grave: Hamilton Cemetery

Hamilton Cemetery on York Boulevard in Hamilton, Ontario, is the oldest public burial ground in the city. It is located on Burlington Heights, a high sand and gravel isthmus that separates Hamilton's harbor on the east from Cootes Paradise on the west.

== History ==
Historically, the cemetery consists of three, separate burial grounds over 100 acres: Burlington Heights Cemetery, the Christ Church Grounds, and the Church of Ascension Grounds. It has been a contentious issue whether a flood, which around the 1860s inundated the city, necessitated the recollection of gravestones to be amassed in one place.

From 1850 until 1892, each burial ground was administered separately, but by the beginning of the 1890s, the church wardens had difficulty paying for the maintenance and upkeep of their areas. In 1892, the City of Hamilton agreed to assume responsibility for all the grounds, which were renamed "Hamilton Cemetery".

== Notable plots ==
=== Mayors ===
Thirty-three mayors of Hamilton are buried/interred here, including:

- Colin Campbell Ferrie (1808–1856)
- John Rose Holden (1821–1879)
- James Cummings (1815–1894)
- Charles Magill(1816-1898)
- John Francis Moore (1816–1870)
- George Hamilton Mills
- Benjamin Ernest Charlton (1835–1901)
- Hutchison Clark (1806–1877)
- James Edwin O'Reilly (1833–1907)
- George Murison
- George Roach
- Francis Edwin Kilvert
- John James Mason
- Alexander McKay
- William Doran
- David McLellan
- Peter Campbell Blaicher
- George Elias Tuckett (1835–1900)
- Edward Alexander Colquhoun
- John Strathearn Hendrie
- Wellington Jeffers Morden
- Sanford Dennis Biggar
- Thomas Joseph Stewart
- George Harmon Lees
- John Allan
- Charles Goodenough Booker
- George Charles Coppley
- Thomas William Jutten
- Freeman Ferrier Treleaven
- William Burton
- John Peebles
- Herbert Earl Wilton
- Samuel Lawrence

=== Others ===
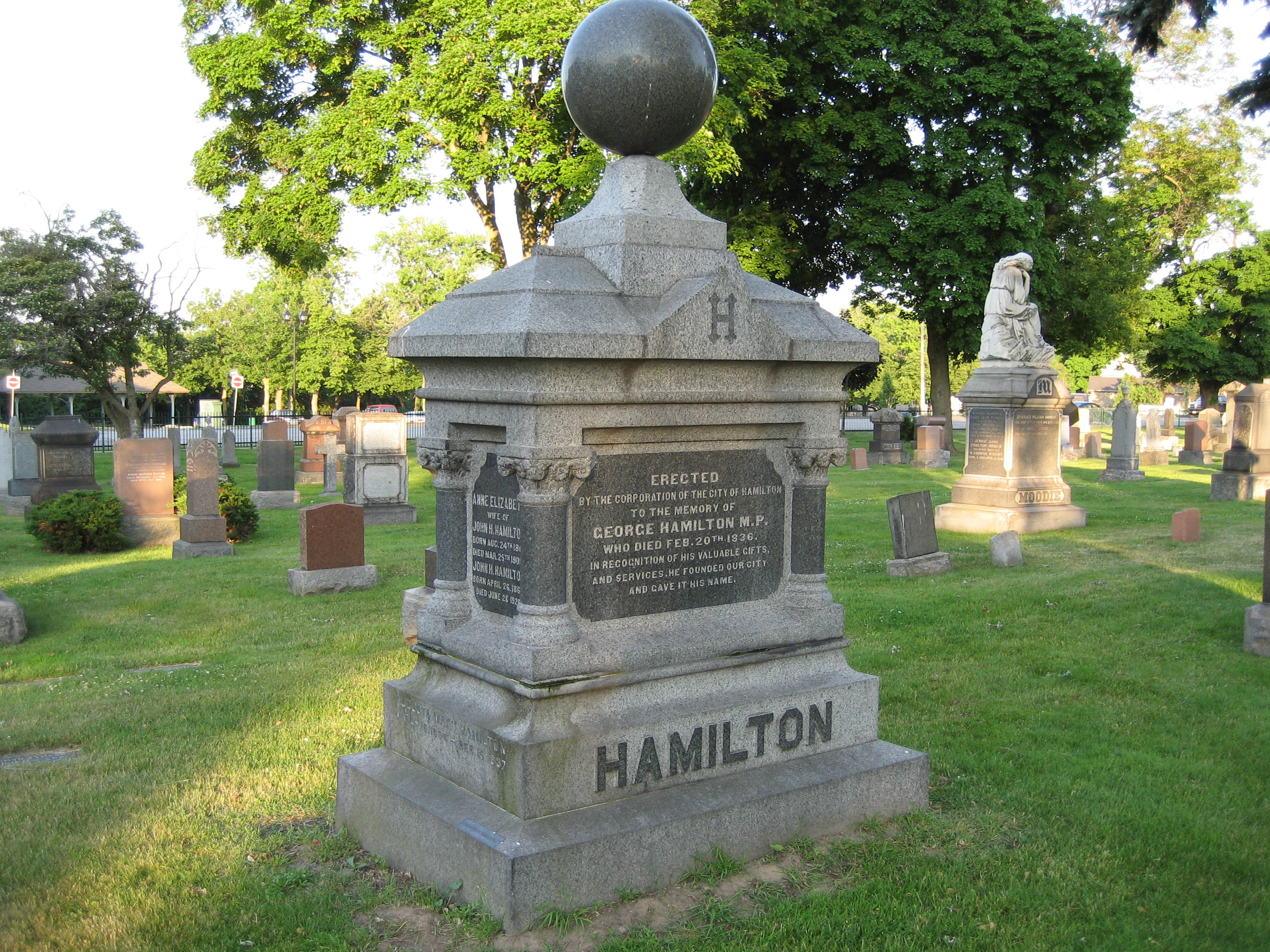
George Hamilton's monument

- George Hamilton (1788–1836, cenotaph – buried at family plot at Mountainside Park)
- James Gage (1774–1854)
- Peter Hunter Hamilton
- Peter Hess
- Richard Butler
- James Jolley
- Andrew Ross
- William W. Cooke

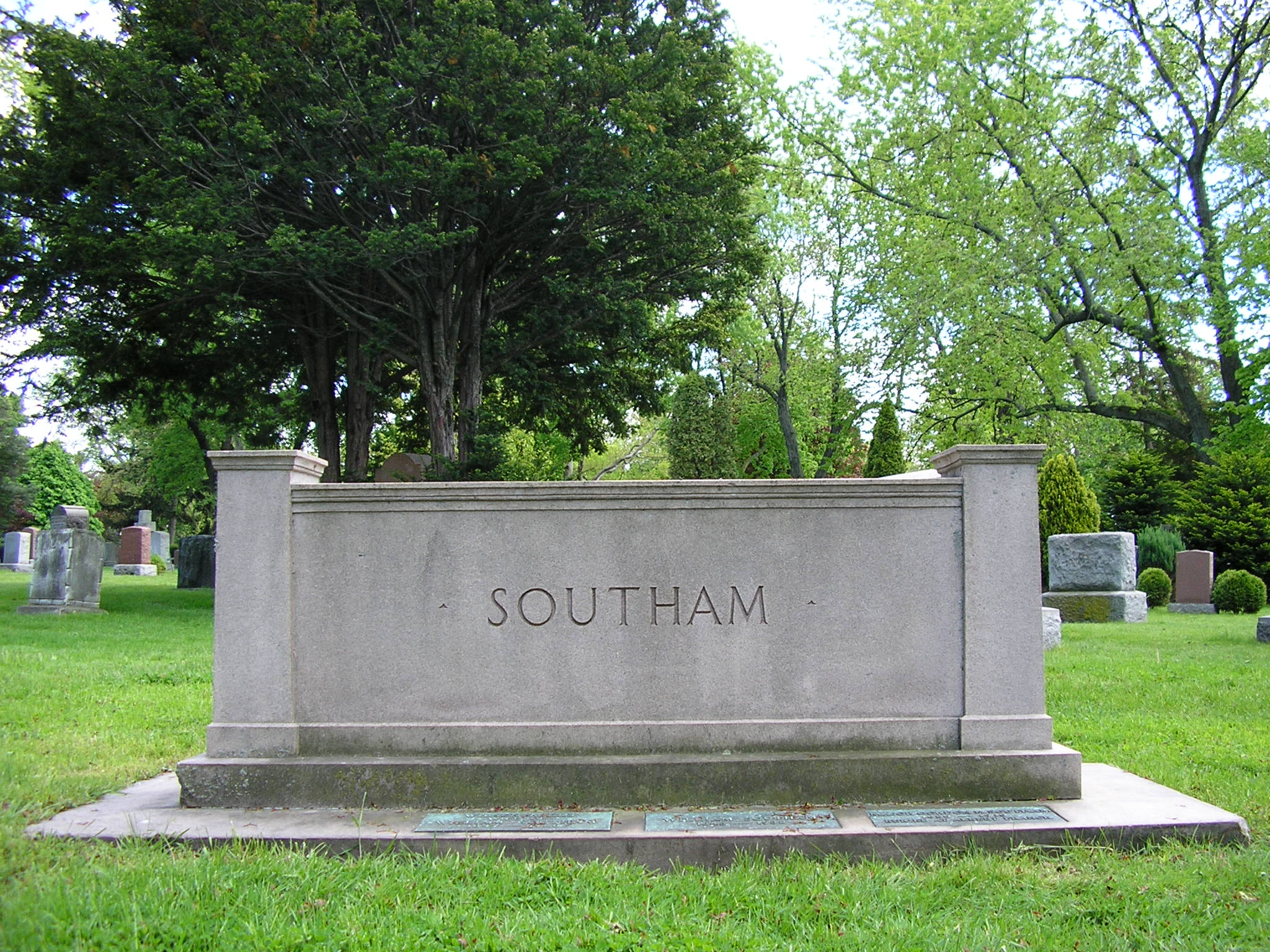
Southam family memorial

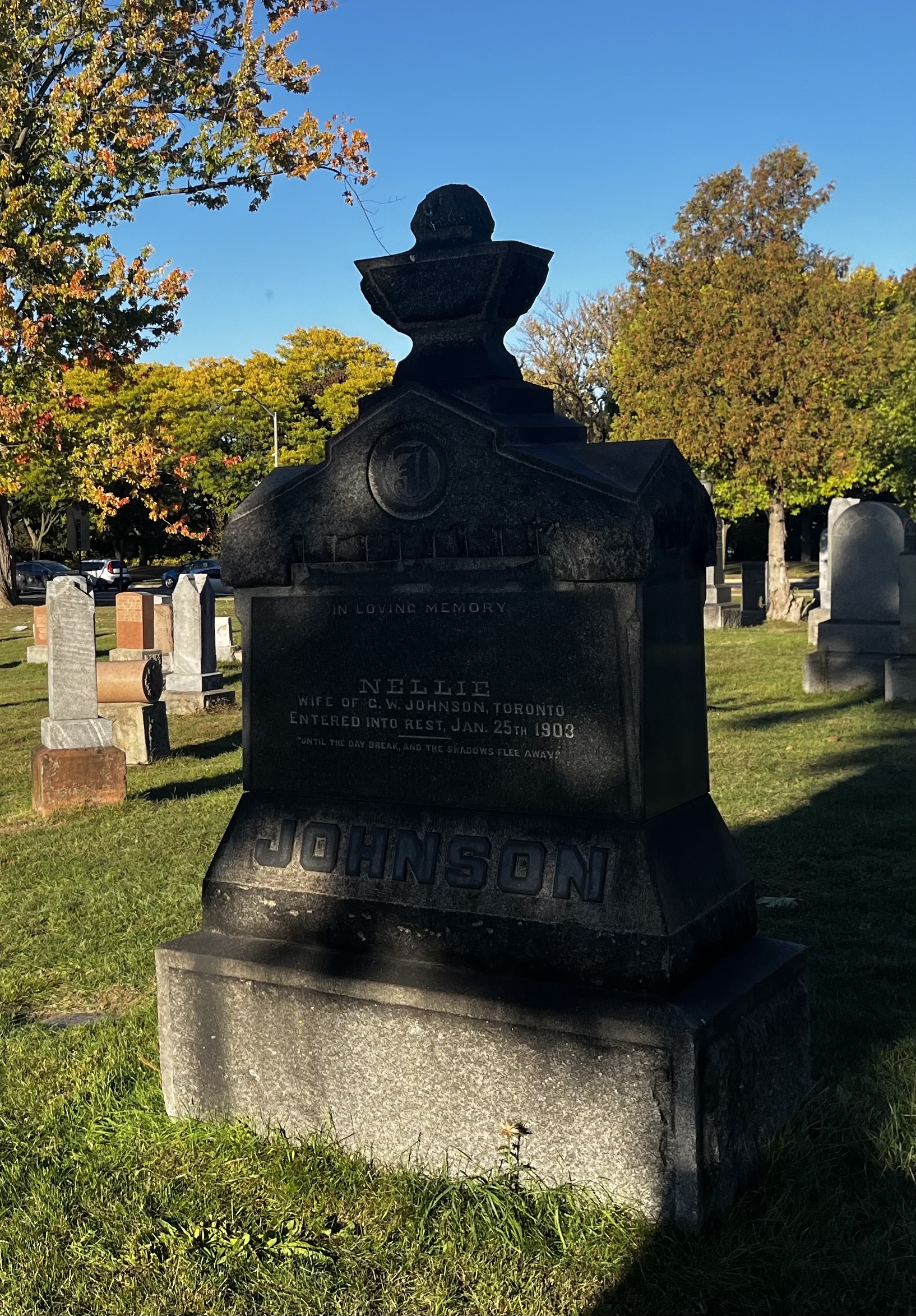
Tomb of George Washington Johnson, who was buried with his third wife Nellie Johnson

- Adam Beck – founded the Hydro-Electric Power Commission of Ontario
- Adelaide Hoodless (1858–1910) – founded the Women's Institute
- William Eli Sanford – Senator
- Harcourt Burland Bull – Senator
- Andrew Trew Wood – Senator
- Donald MacInnes – Senator
- Adam Hope – Senator
- John Milne – Senator
- Martha Julia Cartmell – founder of Toyo Eiwa Jogakuin Private Academy for Girls, Japan
- Thomas Stinson
- Hugh Cossart Baker Sr. – founder of the first life insurance company in Canada, the Canada Life Assurance Company
- Hugh Cossart Baker Jr. – telephone pioneer
- Sir John Strathearn Hendrie – 11th Lieutenant Governor of Ontario
- John Charles Fields – mathematician, founder of the Fields Medal
- Thomas McQuesten – politician
- Allan Studholme – politician
- Arthur Crisp – artist
- Hortense Gordon – artist
- George Washington Johnson – lyricist for the popular folk song When You and I Were Young, Maggie

== Common stones ==
A large number of the stones contain masonic symbols, as well as a number of carved tree-stumps. Several family vaults are also found here, including the Sanford Vault, the Tuckett vault, the Thomas C Watkins vault, the Col. Land Family Vault and the Stinson Family Mausoleum. Oddly, there is indication that these crypts are renovations of an existing (ancient) stone building. Even more curious, is that these crypts are half-buried in a mound of earth.

== War graves ==
The cemetery contains the war graves of 139 Commonwealth service personnel, 127 from World War I and 12 from World War II.
