= William Distin =

William Distin may refer to:

- William G. Distin, Adirondack Great Camp architect
- William L. Distin, Canadian municipal politician
