= Alexander David Stewart =

Canadian politician

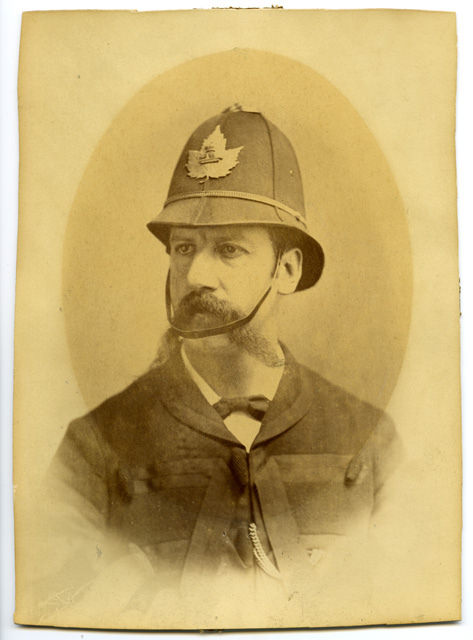

Mayor of Hamilton, Ontario
- In office 1894–1895
- Preceded by: Peter Campbell Blaicher
- Succeeded by: George Elias Tuckett

Personal details
- Born: September 19, 1852 Leghorn, Grand Duchy of Tuscany
- Died: March 13, 1899 (aged 46) Somewhere Island, Yukon
- Resting place: Somewhere Island, Yukon
- Spouse: Emily Mary Otter (1878)
- Education: University of Edinburgh
- Profession: Chief of Police

Alexander David Stewart (September 19, 1852 – March 13, 1899) was mayor of Hamilton, Ontario, from 1894 to 1895.

== Biography ==
Stewart was born in Leghorn, Grand Duchy of Tuscany. He trained as a medical doctor at University of Edinburgh, but he never practiced as a doctor. He also studied with Joseph Lister at Aberdeen.

He married Emily Mary Otter in 1878.

He served as Chief of Hamilton Police in Hamilton for six years. In 1885, he was sent to act as Marshall of the Court for the Trial of Louis Riel. Electricity was installed in City Hall during his two-year term. In 1898, he joined an expedition to the Yukon gold fields. He died of scurvy on Somewhere Island, Yukon, at the confluence of the Peel and Beaver Rivers, March 13, 1899, and was buried there.
