= John Fisher (North American politician) =

American politician (1806–1882)

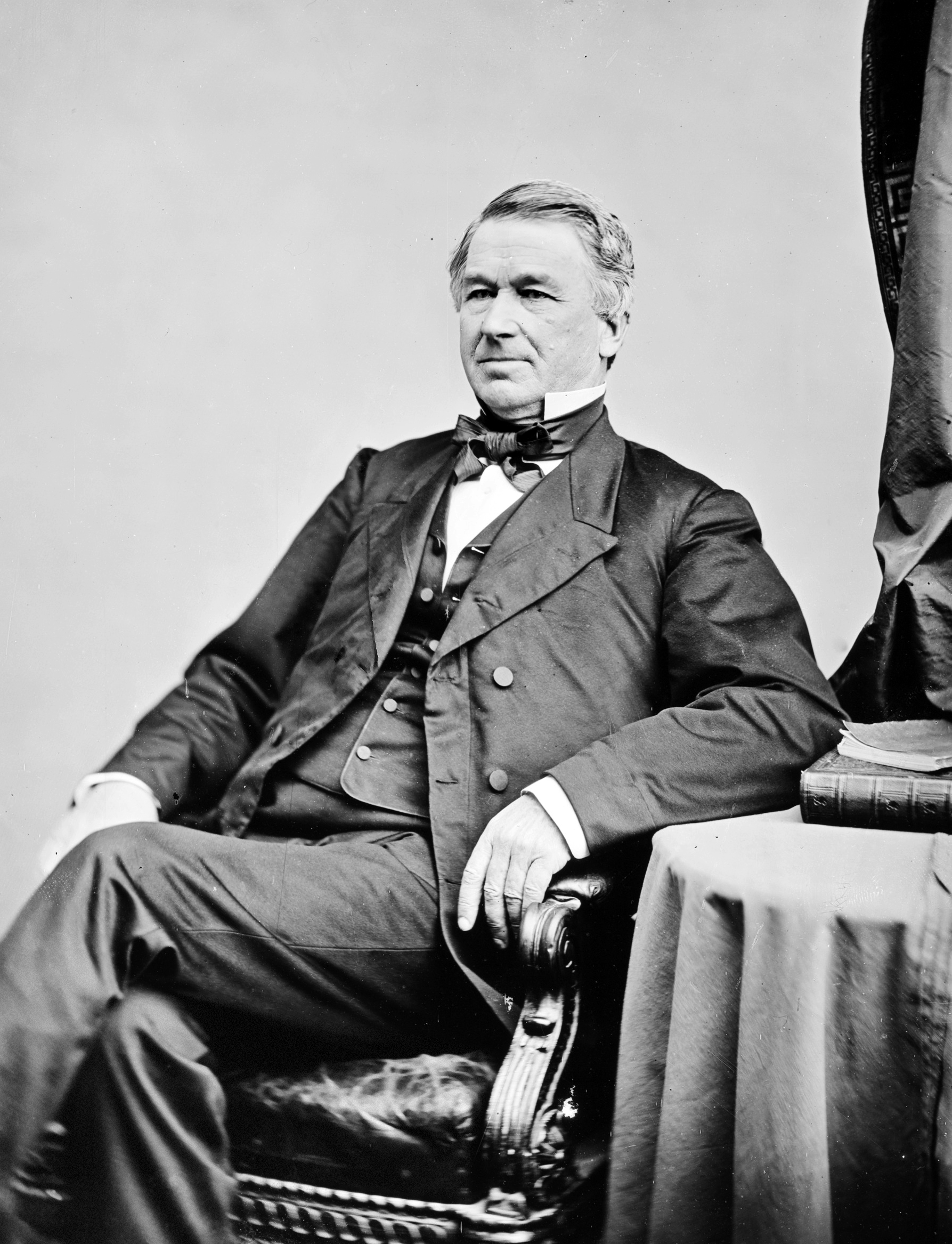

Member of the U.S. House of Representatives from New York's 29th district
- In office March 4, 1869 – March 3, 1871
- Preceded by: Burt Van Horn
- Succeeded by: Seth Wakeman

4th Mayor of Hamilton, Ontario
- In office 1850–1850
- Preceded by: William L. Distin
- Succeeded by: John Rose Holden

Personal details
- Born: March 13, 1806 Londonderry, New Hampshire
- Died: March 28, 1882 (aged 76) Batavia, New York
- Party: Republican

John Fisher (March 13, 1806 – March 28, 1882), iron founder, manufacturer, was a politician, both in Canada and the United States. He had one son.

Born in Londonderry, New Hampshire, Fisher moved to Hamilton, Ontario, Canada in 1835, when he established what is believed to have been the first foundry in the city, on the northwest corner of James and Merrick streets, Fisher designed and manufactured the first threshing machines in Canada, basing his ideas on a 1786 model designed by a Scot. He expanded the business with his cousin Calvin McQuesten (who himself would found a powerful Hamilton family), they formed a partnership with two other men, to manage the foundry, with McQuesten remaining in the United States to gain additional necessary funds.

The firm experienced difficulties getting established In 1836 Fisher was forced to sell some assets, lay off workers, and seek loans. In the following year, anti-American sentiment was high, owing to the support given by the United States to William Lyon Mackenzie, and it found expression in a refusal to pay bills and threats to burn the foundry. Fisher was ready to leave, but McQuesten convinced him to remain. The latter settled in Hamilton in 1839, and the two partners, by now the sole proprietors of the business, were determined to make it prosper. The foundry expanded during the 1840s, producing a variety of agricultural equipment. In the 1850s, Fisher, in partnership with other foundries, was a contractor for the Great Western Railway in the manufacture of railway cars. The firm of Fisher and McQuesten was moved to Wellington Street in 1855 after a fire destroyed the original premises. Six years later (1857), he sold his interest in the foundry and moved from Hamilton to Batavia, New York. He was elected as a Republican representative to the 41st Congress (1869–1871), but was unsuccessful in his subsequent re-election bid.

During his years in Hamilton, Fisher was an active participant in the civic life of the community. In 1843 he built a fire engine which he donated to the city and which was housed at the James Street Foundry. Fisher also served on the Hamilton city council as an alderman from 1848 to 1849, and became the city's fourth mayor (for a one-year term) in 1850. He helped build an orphan asylum donating in 1851 £100 (which according to some sources was his salary as mayor) to the Hamilton Ladies' Benevolent Society for the costs of construction. He served on the building committee with Edward Jackson and Edward Cartwright Thomas, and the asylum (Barton Street Jail) on Wellington Street opened in June 1853.

U.S. House of Representatives
Preceded by Burt Van Horn	Member of the U.S. House of Representatives from New York's 29th congressional district 1869–1871	Succeeded by Seth Wakeman
