= John Francis Moore (politician) =

Mayor of Hamilton, Ontario
- In office 1857–1857
- Preceded by: James Cummings
- Succeeded by: George Hamilton Mills

Personal details
- Born: 1816 Wiltshire, England
- Died: 1870 (aged 53–54) Montreal, Quebec
- Resting place: Hamilton Cemetery
- Spouse(s): Jane Loughry (1817-1849); Elizabeth Donnelly (1828-1857)
- Profession: lumber merchant

John Francis Moore (1816 Wiltshire, England- April 5, 1870, Montreal, Quebec) was a lumber merchant and politician. He was mayor of Hamilton, Ontario in 1857. He was married twice, first to Jane Loughry, and secondly to Elizabeth Donnelly.

Little is known of the life of John Francis Moore, who came to Hamilton about 1840. He and his brother Edward formed J. and F. Moore Lumber Merchants and Nursery, located at Rebecca Street; south side of market square. The brothers also owned a planing and veneering mill on Wellington Street between King William and Rebecca streets, and constructed many houses on Cathcart Street. The business apparently lasted until 1865, when it ceased to appear in the city directory.

Moore was elected alderman to represent St. Lawrence's Ward and was chosen as Mayor in 1857 by the council. In this capacity, he proclaimed a day of 'humiliation and prayer' following the train accident known as the Desjardins Canal disaster on 12 March 1857. (March 12 - Desjardins Canal Bridge train disaster, Ontario, Canada: Ninety passengers boarded a train from Toronto, Ontario en route to Hamilton, Ontario. As the train approached its final destination, the bridge spanning the Desjardins Canal collapsed as the train derailed. 70 passengers died from trauma or drowning and exposure after being thrown into Cootes Paradise.) During his tenure he was the first mayor to adopt a system of borrowing money by debentures. His first venture was $20,000 for a complete system of sewerage. He also inaugurated the planning for the waterworks that were subsequently opened in 1860, by Prince Edward.

He left the city to live in Montreal where he died in 1870. His remains were returned to Hamilton for burial and the City Council attended the funeral in a body.
