= Distin Cottage =

Historic house in New York, United States

- U.S. National Register of Historic Places
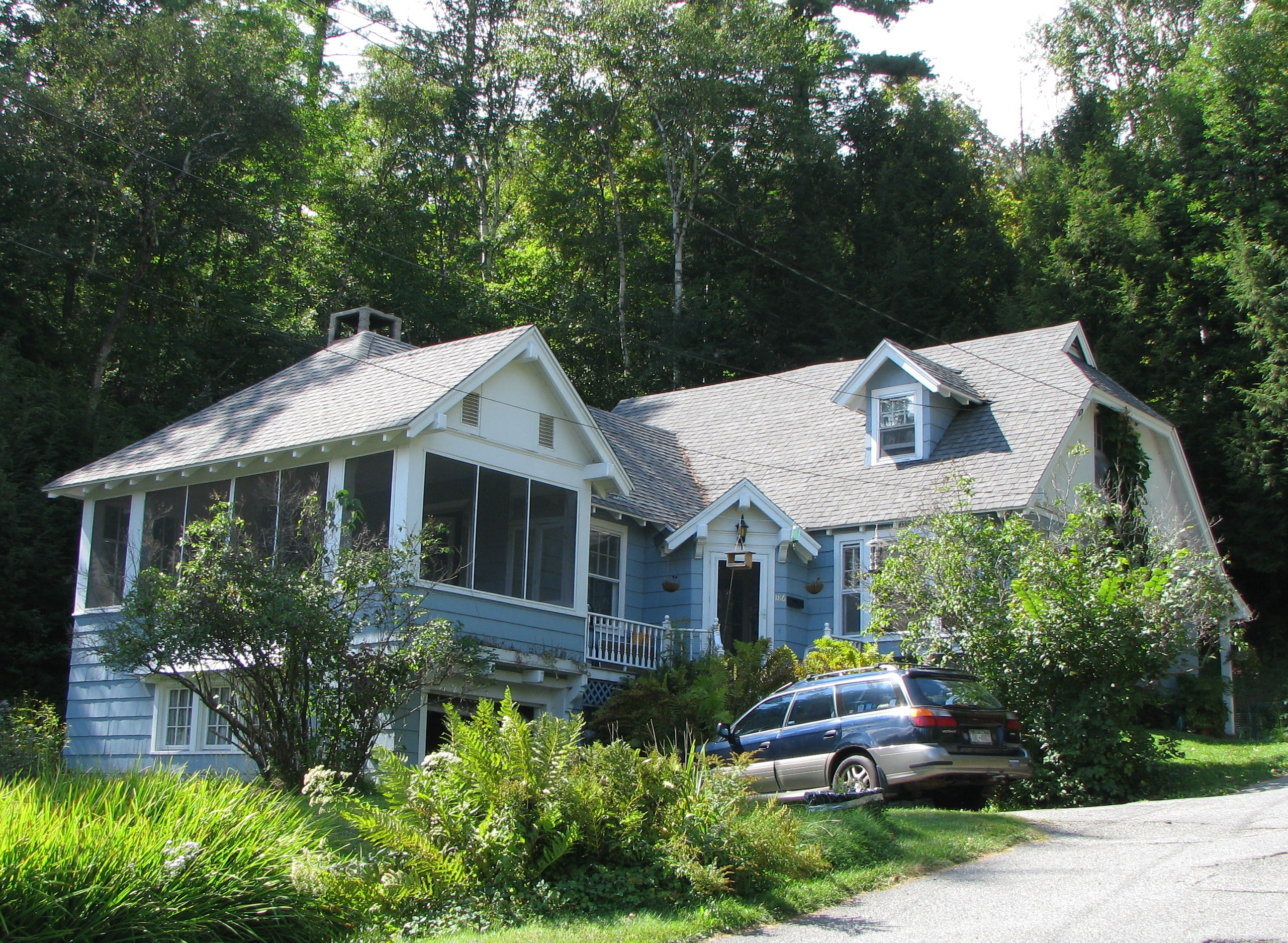
- Distin Cottage, September 2008

- Location within New York Location within the United States
- Location: 11 Kiwassa Rd., Saranac Lake, Harrietstown, New York, U.S.
- Coordinates: 44°19′10″N 74°7′48″W
- Area: less than one acre
- Built: 1920
- Architect: Distin, William G.; Branch & Callahan
- Architectural style: Colonial Revival
- MPS: Saranac Lake MPS
- NRHP reference No.: 92001416
- Added to NRHP: November 6, 1992

Distin Cottage is a historic cure cottage located at Saranac Lake in the town of Harrietstown, Franklin County, New York. It was built about 1920 and is a two-story, L-shaped wood frame single-family dwelling with Colonial Revival style details. It has a hipped roof with a clipped gable and dormers. It features a cure porch measuring 8 feet by 10 feet. It was designed by architect William G. Distin for his father, photographer William L. Distin.

The cottage was rented by Albert Einstein when he first came to Saranac Lake the summers of 1936 and 1937.

It was listed on the National Register of Historic Places in 1992.
