= Robert McElroy =

Robert McElroy may refer to:

- Robert McElroy (Ontario politician) (c. 1810–1881), mayor of Hamilton, Ontario, Canada
- Robert Herbert McElroy (1860–1920), Ontario merchant and political figure
- Robert McNutt McElroy (1872–1959), American historian
- Robert R. McElroy (1928–2012), American photographer
- Robert W. McElroy (born 1954), American Catholic cardinal
