= Nehemiah Ford =

Canadian politician and painter

Mayor of Hamilton
- In office 1852
- Preceded by: John Rose Holden
- Succeeded by: William G. Kerr

Personal details
- Died: between 1858 & 1862
- Spouse: Keziah Beasley
- Children: at least 2
- Profession: politician, painter

Nehemiah Ford was a Canadian politician and painter. He was mayor of Hamilton, Ontario in 1852.

== Biography ==
Little is known of the life of Nehemiah Ford. His presence in Hamilton is recorded in 1839, when he was a member of the executive of the first Mechanics' Institute of Wentworth County. He served as its recording secretary for several years, and was made an honorary member on February 25, 1848, as a reward for his services. A painter by trade, as well as a freemason, Ford was also a member of both Barton Lodge and the Church of St. Thomas.

He married Keziah Beasley in 1835, the daughter of one of Hamilton's earliest settlers, Richard Beasley. They had at least two sons together. The date of Ford's death is not certain, but is believed to be between 1858 and 1862.

== Controversy in office ==
Ford was elected mayor in 1852, and his term of office was unusual. Problems arose when Ford agreed to allow John Gamble Geddes to use the James Street council chambers for a meeting of the Gore and Wellington Church Society. Unfortunately, the time chosen coincided with a scheduled council meeting, and, when Ford agreed to change the time of the municipal meeting, he caused considerable friction. The council criticized his conduct but agreed to vote him the £100 salary for his year's services as mayor. Ford refused to accept the salary with censure and brought the affair to public attention. Although the matter was later smoothed over, Ford refused to run for a second term.
