= Mayor of Hamilton =

Mayor of Hamilton may refer to:

- Mayor of Hamilton, New Zealand
- Mayor of Hamilton, Ontario, Canada
