= Seth Wakeman =

American politician (1811–1880)

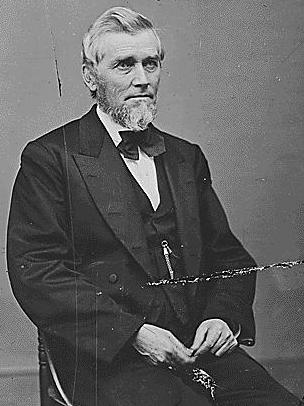

Member of the U.S. House of Representatives from New York's 29th district
- In office March 4, 1871 – March 3, 1873
- Preceded by: John Fisher
- Succeeded by: Freeman Clarke

Town Supervisor of Batavia, New York
- In office 1861–1862
- Preceded by: Martin F. Robertson
- Succeeded by: Harry Backus

Member of the New York State Assembly
- In office January 1, 1856 – December 31, 1857
- Preceded by: Ambrose Stevens
- Succeeded by: Franklin G. Kingman (Genesee County at-large)
- Constituency: Genesee County 1st District

District Attorney of Genesee County, New York
- In office 1850–1855
- Preceded by: John H. Martindale
- Succeeded by: George Brown

Treasurer of Genesee County, New York
- In office 1845–1846
- Preceded by: Pardon C. Sherman
- Succeeded by: Brannan Young

Personal details
- Born: January 15, 1811 Franklin, Vermont, U.S.
- Died: January 4, 1880 (aged 68) Batavia, New York, U.S.
- Resting place: Elmwood Cemetery, Batavia, New York
- Party: Whig (before 1855); Republican (from 1855)
- Spouse(s): Demis Powers (m. 1832–1836, her death); Laura Winans (m. 1856–1880, his death)
- Children: 6
- Profession: Attorney

Seth Wakeman (January 15, 1811 – January 4, 1880) was an American attorney and politician from Batavia, New York. Initially a Whig, and later a Republican, he was most notable for his service in the New York State Assembly from 1856 to 1857 and the United States House of Representatives from 1871 to 1873.

== Early life ==
Wakeman was born in Franklin, Vermont on January 15, 1811, the son of Nathan Wakeman and Phoebe Johnston. The Wakeman family soon moved to Pembroke, New York, where Nathan Wakeman joined the New York Militia for the War of 1812. He died in Malone, New York while on military duty. Seth Wakeman attended the local schools of Pembroke and became a farmer. He served in local offices including constable and justice of the peace, and studied law.

In 1844, Wakeman was admitted to the bar and commenced practice in Batavia, New York. Originally a Whig, he served as Genesee County Treasurer (1845 to 1846), and Genesee County District Attorney (1850 to 1855). He was also active in several business ventures, including serving as secretary of the Batavia and Lancaster Plank Road Company. He was also a member of the board of directors of the Batavia and Oakfield Plank Road Company. In 1852, Wakeman was appointed secretary of the Buffalo and Batavia Plank Road Company.

== Continued career ==
Wakeman became a Republican when the party was founded in the mid-1850s. He was a member of the New York State Assembly (Genesee Co., 1st D.) in 1856 and 1857. Wakeman was also a delegate to the State constitutional convention of 1867 and 1868.

In 1868, Wakeman was a candidate for the Republican nomination for a seat in the United States House of Representatives, which was won by John Fisher, who went on to win the general election. In 1870, Wakeman was elected to the 42nd United States Congress. He served one term, March 4, 1871 to March 3, 1873.

== Later life ==
After leaving Congress, Wakeman resumed practicing law. In 1875 his health began to decline, and he retired from most of his legal and business interests. For the last few years of his life, Wakeman was nearly invalid and largely confined to his home.

Wakeman died in Batavia on January 4, 1880. He was interred at Elmwood Cemetery in Batavia.

== Family ==
In 1832, Wakeman married Demis Powers of Pembroke. They were the parents of two children, Eugene (b. 1834) and Demie (1836–1904). In 1856, Wakeman married Laura Winans of Cleveland. They were the parents of Mary Emma (1860–1919), Bryan Seth (b. 1862), Henry Clay (1864–1870), and William Sprague (1868–1954).

New York State Assembly
Preceded by Ambrose Stevens	New York State Assembly; Genesee County, 1st District; 1856–1857	Succeeded by Franklin G. Kingman (Genesee County at-large)
U.S. House of Representatives
Preceded by John Fisher	Member of the U.S. House of Representatives from New York's 29th congressional district 1871–1873	Succeeded by Freeman Clarke
