= George Sylvester Tiffany =

Canadian lawyer and politician

2nd Mayor of Hamilton, Ontario
- In office 1848–1848
- Preceded by: Colin Campbell Ferrie
- Succeeded by: William L. Distin

Personal details
- Born: 1805 Ancaster, Upper Canada
- Died: 1856 (aged 51) Hamilton, Upper Canada
- Spouse: Eliza Anne Strange
- Parent(s): Esq. George Tiffany; Polly Frieze
- Education: Dartmouth College

George Sylvester Tiffany (1805–1856) was a Canadian lawyer and politician. He was born in 1805 at Ancaster, Upper Canada. He married Eliza Anne Strange, and they had one son and four daughters. He was mayor of Hamilton, Ontario in 1848 and died in 1856. He is buried at St. John's Anglican Churchyard in Ancaster.

The Tiffany family was prominent in Ancaster. His father George was a lawyer, his uncle Oliver a physician, and his uncles Sylvester and Gideon were the publishers of the Upper Canada Gazette from 1794 to 1798 and the Canada Constellation, the first independent newspaper in Upper Canada, from 1799 to 1800. Tiffany was educated at Dartmouth College, New Hampshire, prior to opening a large practice in Hamilton on Hughson Street S. In 1845 he became a director of the Great Western Railway, whose president was Sir Allan MacNab. He borrowed heavily from his uncle Oliver's estate to finance speculation in real estate related to the railway line and, along with MacNab, profited by buying land along the waterfront where the Great Western yards were established. Tiffany Street, named after him, is located in this area. He was also a stockholder in the London and Gore Railway.

Tiffany participated in the community in several capacities. He was commissioned a lieutenant in the 3rd Regiment of Gore Militia 13 December 1838. Tiffany was a Reformer and took prominent role in an 1839 meeting of Hamilton Reformers that recommended more self-government for the colony. In 1843 he was a member of the board of examiners appointed by Hamilton's board of police to find suitable teachers and temporary schoolhouses in the town's five common school districts, in accordance with the requirement of the Common School Act of 1843. Tiffany served as mayor of Hamilton in 1848, and in 1855 was a trustee of a corporation which tried unsuccessfully to establish a college in Hamilton. An Anglican, he was at first a pew-holder in St. Andrew's Presbyterian Church but left it in 1837 after the construction of Christ's Church, the first Anglican place of worship in Hamilton.

A freemason, he became affiliated with Barton Lodge 9 September 1846.
