= 1847 Hamilton, Ontario, municipal election =

1847 Hamilton municipal election
- January 12, 1847
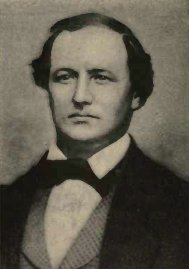
Nominee	Collin Ferrie
Party	Independent
Electoral vote	9
Percentage	90%
Mayor before election
office created
Elected mayor
Collin Ferrie
Independent

The 1847 Hamilton municipal election was the first election held to the newly incorporated Town of Hamilton. The vote was held on January 12, 1847 to select ten members to represent each of the city's five wards on the Hamilton, Ontario, City Council. Those councillors would, in turn, elect one mayor from their ranks and an additional councillor to represent the seat they vacated on Saturday, January 16, 1847.

== Mayoral election ==
The first council of the City of Hamilton met on Saturday, 16 January 1847, to elect a mayor from among their ranks. The Hamilton Spectator and Journal of Commerce reported that "after some discussion", St. Mary's ward councillor Colin Ferrie was proposed and a vote was held, where only one councillor voted against Ferrie's assuming the office. Following the election of Ferrie as mayor, councillors selected Alexander Carpenter as Ferrie's replacement on city council.

Summary of the January 16, 1847 Hamilton, Ontario mayoral election
Candidate	Affiliation	Council vote		Elected?
Candidate	Affiliation	For	Against	Elected?
Colin Ferrie	Independent	9	1	
Total votes		10		
Note: The mayor was elected by councillors from among their ranks.

== Councillors ==
=== St. Andrew's Ward ===
Summary of the January 12, 1847 Hamilton, Ontario St. Andrew's Ward election
Candidate	Affiliation	Popular vote	Elected?
Candidate	Affiliation	Votes	Elected?
H.B. Wilson	Independent	156	
(?) Gunn	Independent	126	
Thomas Gillesby	Independent	59	
Total votes			
Registered voters			
Note: Candidate campaign colours are used as a visual differentiation between candidates and to indicate affiliation.

=== St. George's Ward ===
Summary of the January 12, 1847 Hamilton, Ontario St. George's Ward election
Candidate	Affiliation	Popular vote	Elected?
Candidate	Affiliation	Votes	Elected?
(?) Freeman	Independent	86	
(?) Mills	Independent	84	
(?) Walker	Independent	39	
Total votes			
Registered voters			
Note: Candidate campaign colours are used as a visual differentiation between candidates and to indicate affiliation.

=== St. Patrick's Ward ===
Summary of the January 12, 1847 Hamilton, Ontario St. Patrick's Ward election
Candidate	Affiliation	Popular vote	Elected?
Candidate	Affiliation	Votes	Elected?
(?) Kelly	Independent	131	
(?) O'Reilly	Independent	107	
(?) Clemeat	Independent	86	
Total votes			
Registered voters			
Note: Candidate campaign colours are used as a visual differentiation between candidates and to indicate affiliation.

=== St. Lawrence Ward ===
Summary of the January 12, 1847 Hamilton, Ontario St. Lawrence Ward election
Candidate	Affiliation	Popular vote	Elected?
Candidate	Affiliation	Votes	Elected?
(?) Ford	Independent	113	
(?) Counsel	Independent	75	
(?) Winer	Independent	71	
Total votes			
Registered voters			
Note: Candidate campaign colours are used as a visual differentiation between candidates and to indicate affiliation.

=== St. Mary's Ward ===
Summary of the January 12, 1847 Hamilton, Ontario St. Mary's Ward election
Candidate	Affiliation	Popular vote	Elected?
Candidate	Affiliation	Votes	Elected?
Colin Ferrie	Independent	110	
Andrew "Yankee" Miller	Independent	88	
(?) Webster	Independent	68	
Total votes			
Registered voters			
Note: Candidate campaign colours are used as a visual differentiation between candidates and to indicate affiliation.
