= Chester Samuel Walters =

Canadian politician (1878–1958)

Chester Samuel Walters (August 24, 1878 – December 10, 1958) was a Canadian politician and administrator.

Born in Waterford, Ontario, Walters, a public accountant, founded the Certified Public Accountants' Association. He was elected as mayor of Hamilton in 1915 at age 36. He served until 1916.

In 1934, Walters became deputy minister of public works for the province of Ontario. The next year, he became deputy minister of the Ontario treasury. He served in this post until 1953.
