= Andrew Ross (businessman) =

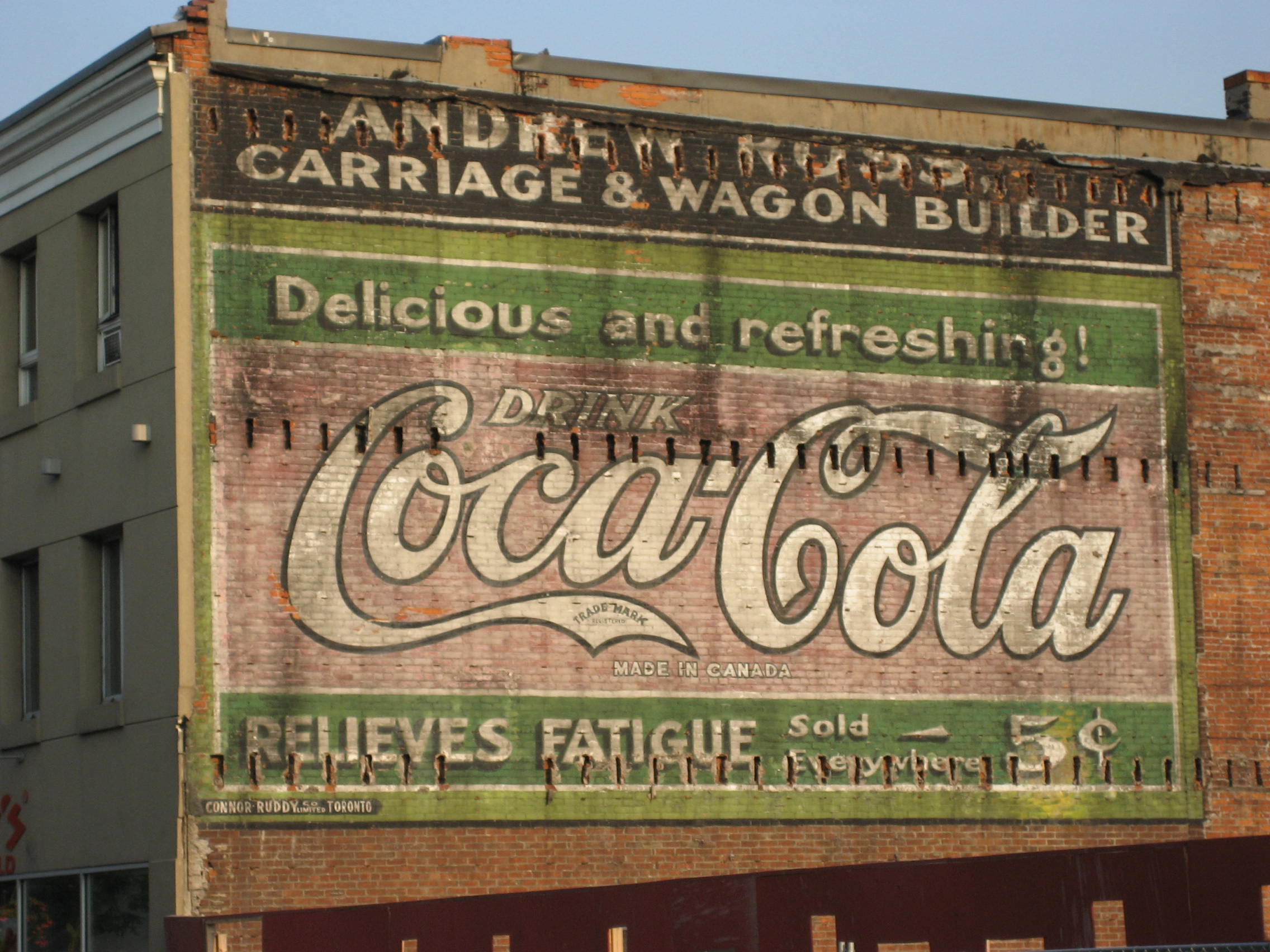
Andrew Ross, carriage and wagon builder signage

Andrew Ross (1857 – December 29, 1941) was a Canadian businessperson closely associated with the city of Hamilton, Ontario.

Ross founded a carriage and wagon factory in 1888 that expanded several times in the years that followed, occupying, by 1912, numbers 281 through 288 on King Street East. With the advent of the motor vehicle, Ross branched into trucks, supplying the Canadian, Dominion and American Express Companies with trucks and wagons by 1910, as well as providing many Hamilton businesses with delivery vehicles. His company also built the Tivoli Theatre and the Barton Street Arena, and he was involved in professional ice hockey (Hamilton Tigers of the NHL) and softball. In 1905, the Scoundrel softball team became world champions under his management.

Ross is buried in Hamilton Cemetery.
