= 1927 Hamilton, Ontario municipal election =

Mayor, Hydro Commissioner, Controllers, and City Council members chosen

1927 Hamilton, Ontario, municipal election
- Monday, December 5, 1927
Candidate	William Burton	Calvin Davis
Party	Independent Conservative	Independent Liberal
Popular vote	15,052	8,382
Mayor before election
Freeman Treleaven
Independent
Elected mayor
William Burton
Independent Conservative

The 1927 Hamilton municipal election was held on December 5, 1927 to select one Mayor, one Hydro Commissioner, four Controllers, and sixteen members of the Hamilton, Ontario, City Council, two from each of the city's eight wards. Voters also cast ballots for trustees for the public school board, and in two bylaw referendum questions regarding an expansion to Hamilton's General Hospital and the city's sewer system.

== Mayor ==
The 1927 Mayoral contest in Hamilton saw the retirement of sitting two-term mayor Freeman Treleaven. On Nomination Day, Treleaven was nominated for a third term by two of his supporters, George Wild and T.H. Simpson. Speaking at city hall, Treleaven indicated he felt his two terms in office had been successful and expressed discomfort at potentially being elected to a third term, as only three other mayors in the city's history up to that point had served more than two terms in office.

With Treleaven declining to seek office, the race for the mayoralty became a two-candidate contest between sitting Controller Calvin Davis and former Controller William Burton. Prior to his nomination for the office of mayor, Burton had been considered a contender for the Hydro Commissioner's seat until November 21, when the Hamilton Spectator confirmed through a campaign supporter that the former Controller's political ambitions had shifted Burton's campaign was affiliated with the local Conservative Party establishment, despite assertions that partisan politics did not play a role in local government. Burton's campaign focused on lower taxes as an incentive to business, keeping municipal spending low, and improving local business façades to present a better local image.

Davis' campaign began much earlier, with speculation of his mayoral ambitions appearing in the Spectator on November 2. At the time of his candidacy, Davis was the dean of Hamilton City Council, having been elected as Ward 1 Councillor in 1918 and moving to the Board of Control the following year, which was a record for continuous service on council. Davis' campaign focused on continuing outgoing mayor Treleaven's work and highlighted the close working relationship between the two.

Despite providing various levels of support to candidates in the past, the city's largest newspaper, the Spectator, opted to not endorse either candidate, rather encouraging electors to consider each candidate's administrative abilities and personal political history.

On Election Day, despite campaigning for a single week, Burton secured a commanding majority, winning every ward in the city.

Summary of the December 5, 1927 Hamilton, Ontario Mayoral Election
Candidate	Affiliation	Popular vote		Elected?
Candidate	Affiliation	Votes	%	Elected?
William Burton	Independent Conservative	15,052	64.24%	
Calvin Davis	Independent Liberal	8,382	35.76%	
Total votes		23,432		
Registered voters				
Note: Candidate campaign colours are used as a visual differentiation between candidates and to indicate affiliation.
Sources: "Burton for Mayor; Demand of the People, Hamilton Spectator, December 6, 1927, 5,11. "Herald Results as Victory for Party," Hamilton Spectator, December 6, 1927, 5,23.

== Hydro Commissioner ==
Summary of the December 5, 1927 Hamilton, Ontario Hydro Commissioner Election
Candidate	Affiliation	Popular vote		Elected?
Candidate	Affiliation	Votes	%	Elected?
Willoughby Ellis	Independent	11,960	54.08%	
George Henry Evoy	Independent	10,157	45.92%	
Total votes		22,117		
Registered voters				
Note: Candidate campaign colours are used as a visual differentiation between candidates and to indicate affiliation.
Sources: "Burton for Mayor; Demand of the People, Hamilton Spectator, December 6, 1927, 5,11.

== Board of Control ==
Summary of the December 5, 1927 Hamilton, Ontario Board of Control Election
Candidate	Affiliation	Popular vote		Elected?
Candidate	Affiliation	Votes	%	Elected?
John Peebles (incumbent)	Independent Liberal	12,926		
William Morrison (incumbent)	Independent Conservative	11,535		
John Henry Bell (incumbent)	Independent Conservative	11,248		
Herbert Arthur Burrell	Independent Conservative	9,896		
John George Sherring	Independent	9,048		
C. Herbert MacKay	Independent	8,395		
Total votes				
Registered voters				
Note: Candidate campaign colours are used as a visual differentiation between candidates and to indicate affiliation.
Sources: "Burton for Mayor; Demand of the People, Hamilton Spectator, December 6, 1927, 5,11. "Herald Results as Victory for Party," Hamilton Spectator, December 6, 1927, 5,23.

== Referendums ==
Hamilton, Ontario, municipal Election 1927 Bylaw Referendums
Question	Yes		No	
Question	Votes	%	Votes	%
A by-law regarding an expansion to Hamilton's General Hospital	5,765	46.44	6,648	53.56
A by-law regarding improvements to Hamilton's storm sewer system	6,262	53.65	5,411	46.35
Total votes				
Registered voters				
Sources: "Burton for Mayor; Demand of the People, Hamilton Spectator, December 6, 1927, 5,11.

== Aldermen ==
=== Ward One ===
Summary of the December 5, 1927 Hamilton, Ontario Ward 1 Alderman Election
Candidate	Affiliation	Popular vote		Elected?
Candidate	Affiliation	Votes	%	Elected?
Herbert Wilton (incumbent)	Independent Conservative	1,904		
Alastan Polson	Independent Conservative	1,871		
Richard Evan Jones (incumbent)	Independent	1,590		
Robert Currie Gardner	Independent	1,509		
Total votes				
Registered voters				
Note: Candidate campaign colours are used as a visual differentiation between candidates and to indicate affiliation.
Sources: "Aldermanic Vote", Hamilton Spectator, December 6, 1927, 11. "Herald Results as Victory for Party," Hamilton Spectator, December 6, 1927, 5,23.

=== Ward Two ===
Summary of the December 5, 1927 Hamilton, Ontario Ward 2 Alderman Election
Candidate	Affiliation	Popular vote		Elected?
Candidate	Affiliation	Votes	%	Elected?
Gordon Flett	Independent Conservative	1,451		
Thomas Wright (incumbent)	Independent Conservative	1,245		
Robert Spera (incumbent)	Independent	1,009		
Henry Lloyd George Westland	Independent Conservative	888		
Total votes				
Registered voters				
Note: Candidate campaign colours are used as a visual differentiation between candidates and to indicate affiliation.
Sources: "Aldermanic Vote", Hamilton Spectator, December 6, 1927, 11. "Herald Results as Victory for Party," Hamilton Spectator, December 6, 1927, 5,23.

=== Ward Three ===
Summary of the December 5, 1927 Hamilton, Ontario Ward 3 Alderman Election
Candidate	Affiliation	Popular vote		Elected?
Candidate	Affiliation	Votes	%	Elected?
Argue Martin (incumbent)	Independent Conservative	Acclaimed		
Cranmer Riselay (incumbent)	Independent Conservative	Acclaimed		
Total votes				
Registered voters				
Note: Candidate campaign colours are used as a visual differentiation between candidates and to indicate affiliation.
Sources: "Aldermanic Vote", Hamilton Spectator, December 6, 1927, 11. "Herald Results as Victory for Party," Hamilton Spectator, December 6, 1927, 5,23.

=== Ward Four ===
Summary of the December 5, 1927 Hamilton, Ontario Ward 4 Alderman Election
Candidate	Affiliation	Popular vote		Elected?
Candidate	Affiliation	Votes	%	Elected?
Donald McFarlane (incumbent)	Independent Conservative	1,513		
Thomas O'Heir	Independent Conservative	666		
William Ronald (incumbent)	Independent	624		
William Thompson	Independent	524		
Edward Hughes	Independent	409		
Percy Wright	Independent	371		
Henry Roberts	Canadian Labour Party	149		
Total votes				
Registered voters				
Note: Candidate campaign colours are used as a visual differentiation between candidates and to indicate affiliation.
Sources: "Aldermanic Vote", Hamilton Spectator, December 6, 1927, 11. "Herald Results as Victory for Party," Hamilton Spectator, December 6, 1927, 5,23.

=== Ward Five ===
Summary of the December 5, 1927 Hamilton, Ontario Ward 5 Alderman Election
Candidate	Affiliation	Popular vote		Elected?
Candidate	Affiliation	Votes	%	Elected?
Charles Aitchison (incumbent)	Canadian Labour Party	1,368		
Albert Marck	Independent Conservative	1,309		
George Halcrow	Independent	1,139		
Total votes				
Registered voters				
Note: Candidate campaign colours are used as a visual differentiation between candidates and to indicate affiliation.
Sources: "Aldermanic Vote", Hamilton Spectator, December 6, 1927, 11. "Herald Results as Victory for Party," Hamilton Spectator, December 6, 1927, 5,23.

=== Ward Six ===
Summary of the December 5, 1927 Hamilton, Ontario Ward 6 Alderman Election
Candidate	Affiliation	Popular vote		Elected?
Candidate	Affiliation	Votes	%	Elected?
John Hodgson (incumbent)	Independent Conservative	1,834		
Fred Brooks	Independent Conservative	1,564		
Archie Pollock	Canadian Labour Party	864		
Total votes				
Registered voters				
Note: Candidate campaign colours are used as a visual differentiation between candidates and to indicate affiliation.
Sources: "Aldermanic Vote", Hamilton Spectator, December 6, 1927, 11. "Herald Results as Victory for Party," Hamilton Spectator, December 6, 1927, 5,23.

=== Ward Seven ===
Summary of the December 5, 1927 Hamilton, Ontario Ward 7 Alderman Election
Candidate	Affiliation	Popular vote		Elected?
Candidate	Affiliation	Votes	%	Elected?
Archie Burton (incumbent)	Independent Conservative	2,222		
Charles Brayley	Independent Conservative	1,122		
Samuel Clark	Independent	1,052		
Stanley Marriner	Canadian Labour Party	299		
Total votes				
Registered voters				
Note: Candidate campaign colours are used as a visual differentiation between candidates and to indicate affiliation.
Sources: "Aldermanic Vote", Hamilton Spectator, December 6, 1927, 11. "Herald Results as Victory for Party," Hamilton Spectator, December 6, 1927, 5,23.

=== Ward Eight ===
Summary of the December 5, 1927 Hamilton, Ontario Ward 8 Alderman Election
Candidate	Affiliation	Popular vote		Elected?
Candidate	Affiliation	Votes	%	Elected?
Sam Lawrence (incumbent)	Canadian Labour Party	2,222		
Alfred Smees	Independent Conservative	1,641		
Thomas Lewington	Independent	1,571		
Henry Dirks	Independent	434		
George Jones	Independent	372		
Total votes				
Registered voters				
Note: Candidate campaign colours are used as a visual differentiation between candidates and to indicate affiliation.
Sources: "Aldermanic Vote", Hamilton Spectator, December 6, 1927, 11. "Herald Results as Victory for Party," Hamilton Spectator, December 6, 1927, 5,23.

== Board of education ==
=== Ward One ===
Summary of the December 5, 1927 Hamilton Board of Education Ward 1 Trustee Election
Candidate	Affiliation	Popular vote		Elected?
Candidate	Affiliation	Votes	%	Elected?
John Pearson MacKay (incumbent)	Independent	Acclaimed		
Total votes				
Registered voters				
Note: Candidate campaign colours are used as a visual differentiation between candidates and to indicate affiliation.
Sources: "Nominations for School Trustee", Hamilton Spectator, November 28, 1927, 5.

=== Ward Two ===
Summary of the December 5, 1927 Hamilton Board of Education Ward 2 Trustee Election
Candidate	Affiliation	Popular vote		Elected?
Candidate	Affiliation	Votes	%	Elected?
Wallace William Lees (incumbent)	Independent	Acclaimed		
Total votes				
Registered voters				
Note: Candidate campaign colours are used as a visual differentiation between candidates and to indicate affiliation.
Sources: "Nominations for School Trustee", Hamilton Spectator, November 28, 1927, 5.

=== Ward Three ===
Summary of the December 5, 1927 Hamilton Board of Education Ward 3 Trustee Election
Candidate	Affiliation	Popular vote		Elected?
Candidate	Affiliation	Votes	%	Elected?
S.B. Russell (incumbent)	Independent	Acclaimed		
Total votes				
Registered voters				
Note: Candidate campaign colours are used as a visual differentiation between candidates and to indicate affiliation.
Sources: "Nominations for School Trustee", Hamilton Spectator, November 28, 1927, 5.

=== Ward Four ===
Summary of the December 5, 1927 Hamilton Board of Education Ward 4 Trustee Election
Candidate	Affiliation	Popular vote		Elected?
Candidate	Affiliation	Votes	%	Elected?
George R. Allan (incumbent)	Independent Conservative	Acclaimed		
Total votes				
Registered voters				
Note: Candidate campaign colours are used as a visual differentiation between candidates and to indicate affiliation.
Sources: "Nominations for School Trustee", Hamilton Spectator, November 28, 1927, 5.

=== Ward Five ===
Summary of the December 5, 1927 Hamilton Board of Education Ward 5 Trustee Election
Candidate	Affiliation	Popular vote		Elected?
Candidate	Affiliation	Votes	%	Elected?
Thomas McIlwraith (incumbent)	Independent	Acclaimed		
Total votes				
Registered voters				
Note: Candidate campaign colours are used as a visual differentiation between candidates and to indicate affiliation.
Sources: "Nominations for School Trustee", Hamilton Spectator, November 28, 1927, 5.

=== Ward Six ===
Summary of the December 5, 1927 Hamilton Board of Education Ward 6 Trustee Election
Candidate	Affiliation	Popular vote		Elected?
Candidate	Affiliation	Votes	%	Elected?
George Armstrong (incumbent)	Independent	Acclaimed		
Total votes				
Registered voters				
Note: Candidate campaign colours are used as a visual differentiation between candidates and to indicate affiliation.
Sources: "Nominations for School Trustee", Hamilton Spectator, November 28, 1927, 5.

=== Ward Seven ===
Summary of the December 5, 1927 Hamilton Board of Education Ward 7 Trustee Election
Candidate	Affiliation	Popular vote		Elected?
Candidate	Affiliation	Votes	%	Elected?
George Wild (incumbent)	Independent Conservative	Acclaimed		
Total votes				
Registered voters				
Note: Candidate campaign colours are used as a visual differentiation between candidates and to indicate affiliation.
Sources: "Nominations for School Trustee", Hamilton Spectator, November 28, 1927, 5.

=== Ward Eight ===
Summary of the December 5, 1927 Hamilton Board of Education Ward 8 Trustee Election
Candidate	Affiliation	Popular vote		Elected?
Candidate	Affiliation	Votes	%	Elected?
Harold Stanley Burns (incumbent)	Independent	Acclaimed		
Total votes				
Registered voters				
Note: Candidate campaign colours are used as a visual differentiation between candidates and to indicate affiliation.
Sources: "Nominations for School Trustee", Hamilton Spectator, November 28, 1927, 5.
