= Adam Ferrie =

Canadian businessman (1777–1863)

Adam Ferrie (15 April 1777 – 24 December 1863) was a Canadian businessman and political figure who lived much of his life in Scotland.

== Biography ==
Ferrie was born in Irvine, Ayrshire, Scotland, in 1777 and set up a cotton printing shop there in 1792. He moved to Glasgow in 1799. After expanding rapidly until around 1815. After that, his business declined due to the failures of associates he invested in. To improve his sales in Canada and establish his sons, he set up an import-export firm with William Cormack in Montreal. He moved to Montreal with his family in 1829 so that he could keep better control of the business. Ferrie opened a branch in Hamilton; his sons, Colin Campbell and Adam Jr., managed the operation there. Additional branches were opened in Preston, Brantford, Nelson and Dundas.

Adam Ferrie played a central role in keeping the banks of the Clyde River open as a public right of way. He and four other people were awarded "The Reward of Public Spirit" for their efforts.

Ferrie was a member of the Montreal Committee of Trade and helped form its successor, the Montreal Board of Trade, in 1842. He was appointed to the municipal council for Montreal in 1840 and, in 1841, to the Legislative Council of the Province of Canada. Besides his involvement with politics, he also invested his time in the less fortunate members of the community, helping to aid victims of cholera, mainly new immigrants, and forming a cooperative bakery so that bread could be purchased at reasonable prices.

Ferrie helped form the City Bank of Montreal and held shares in the Gore Bank at Hamilton. He left Montreal for Hamilton in 1853 and died there in 1863.
