= St. John's in the Wilderness Episcopal Church =

Church in the New York Adirondacks

Coordinates: 44°26′26″N 74°14′49″W

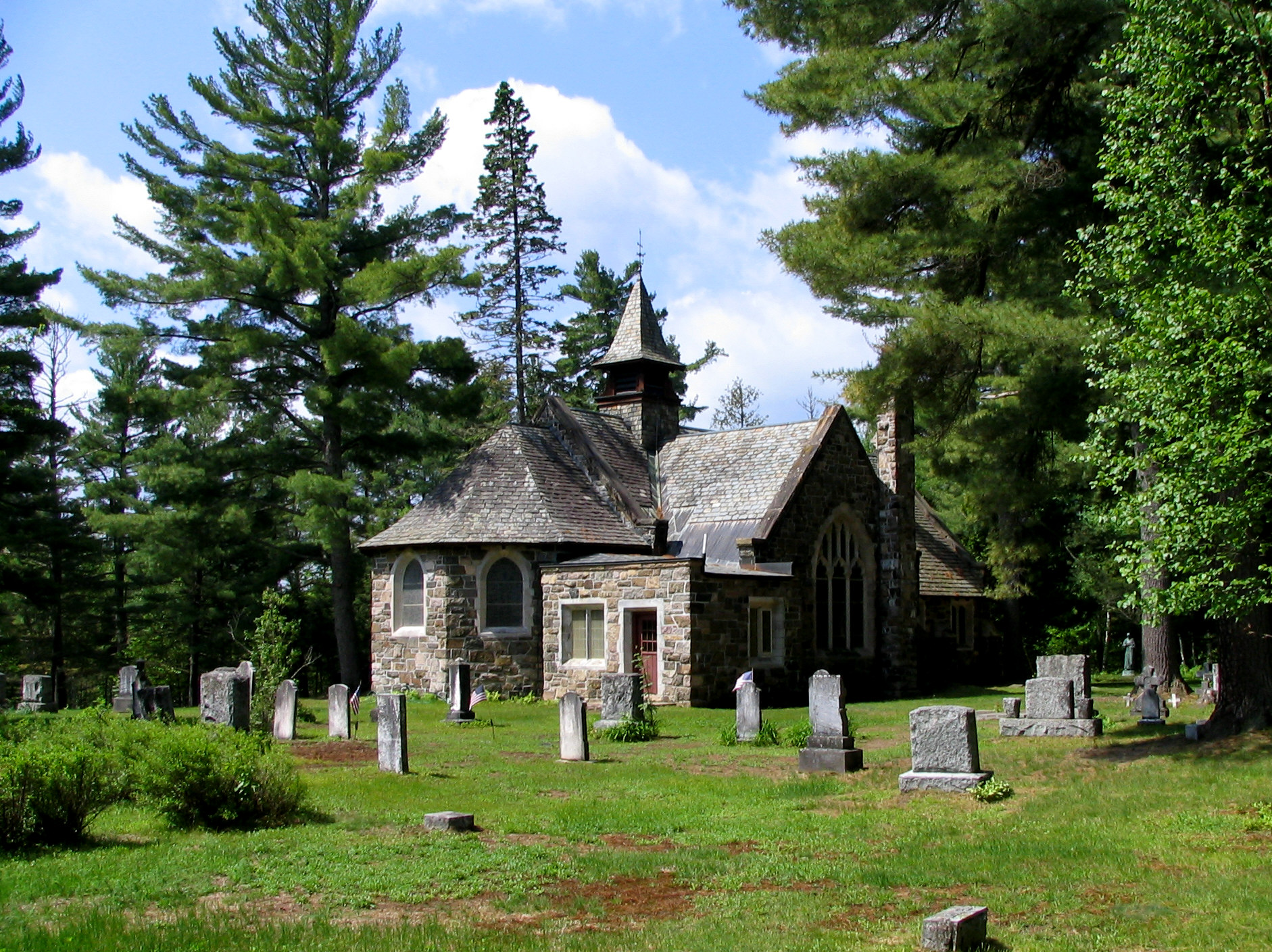
St. Johns in the Wilderness

St. John's in the Wilderness Episcopal Church is an Episcopal church in Paul Smiths in the Adirondacks, New York State, United States. It was founded in 1876 by Dr. Edward Livingston Trudeau with the help of Paul Smith and many of the wealthy camp owners around Spitfire, Upper, and Lower Saint Regis Lakes. The original log building burned in 1928, and was replaced by the present structure, designed by William G. Distin, in 1930. The non-denominational cemetery surrounding the church contains the graves of Dr. Trudeau, Paul Smith, Charles Minot Dole(founder of the National Ski Patrol), Clifford R. Pettis (the father of reforestation) and several other notable residents of the area.

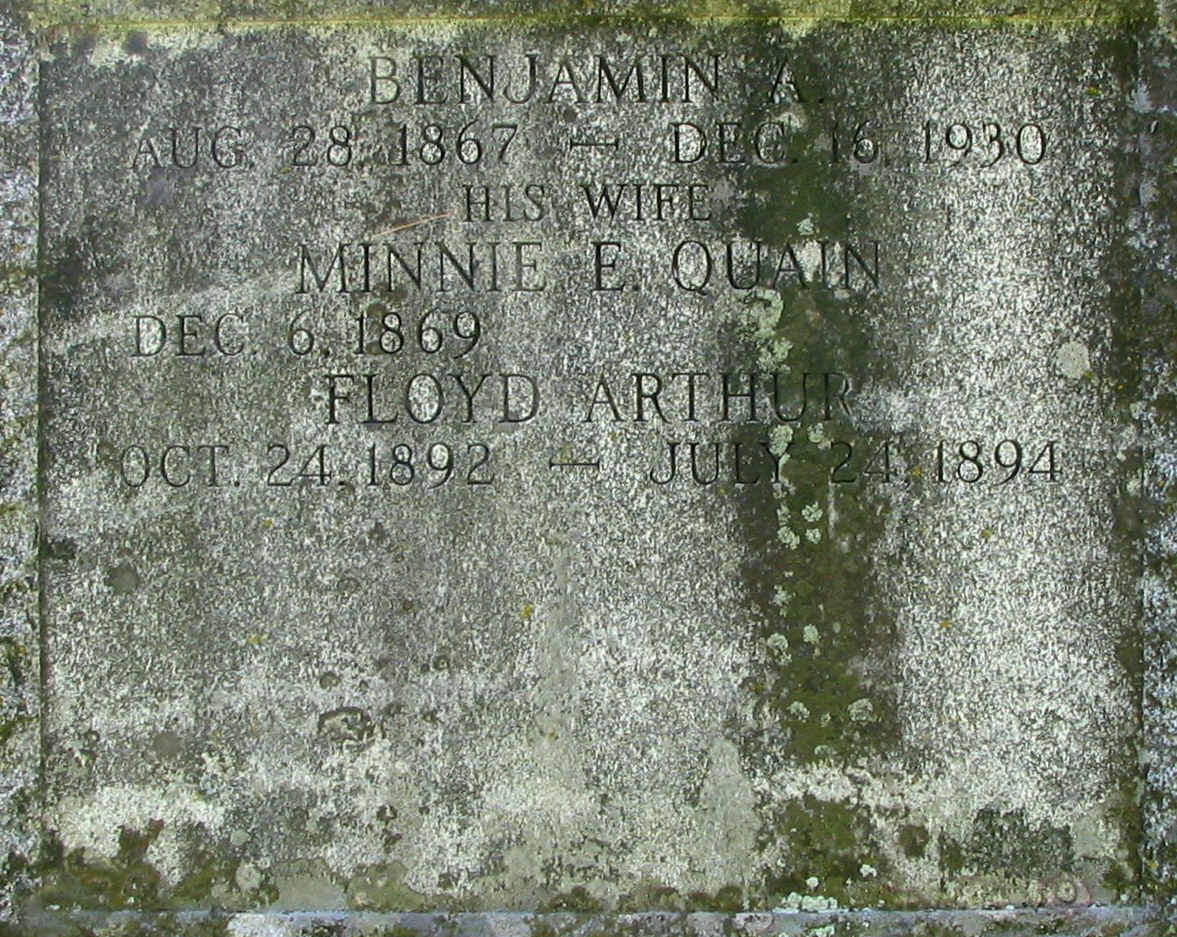
Benjamin A. Muncil's gravestone

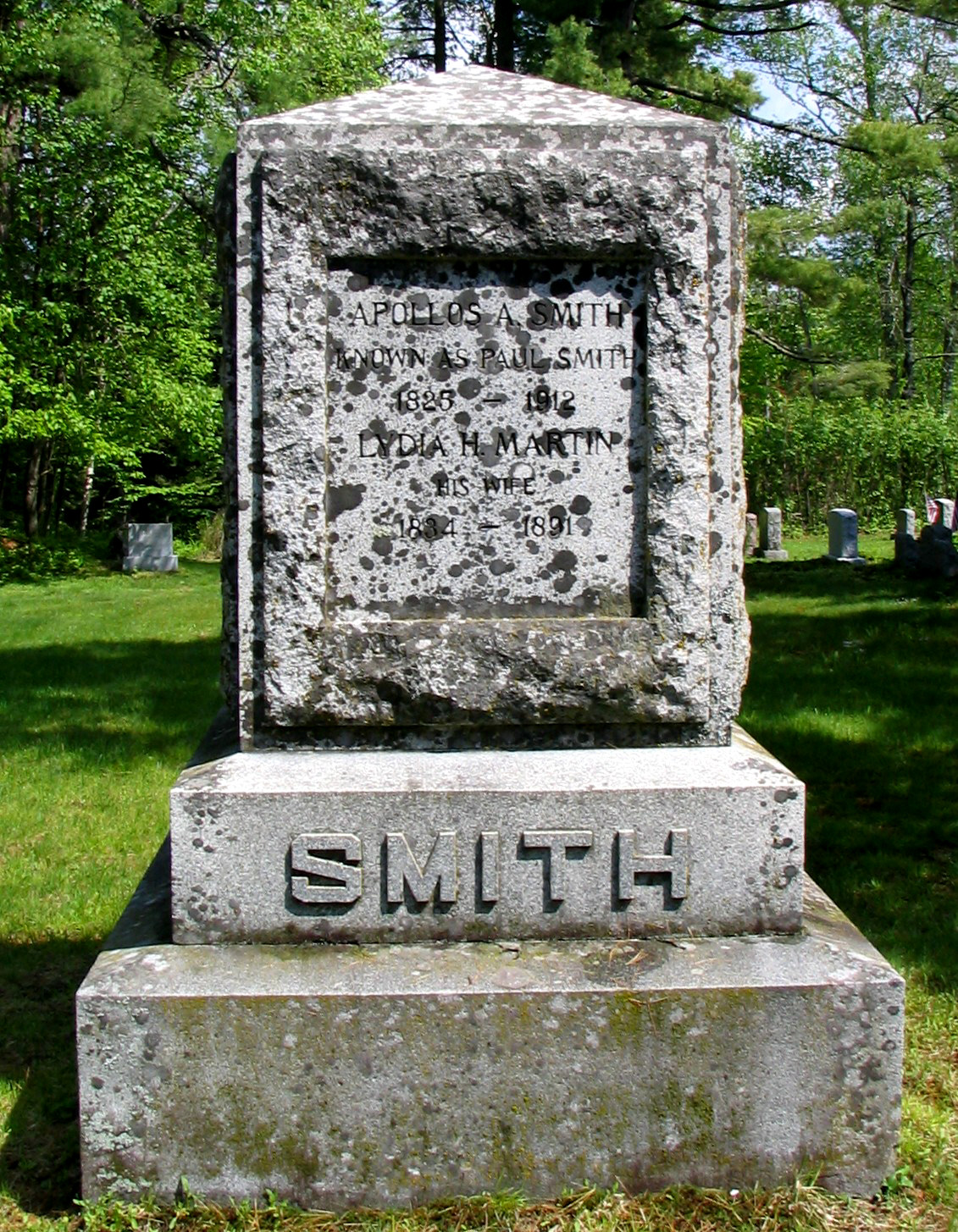
Paul Smith's gravestone

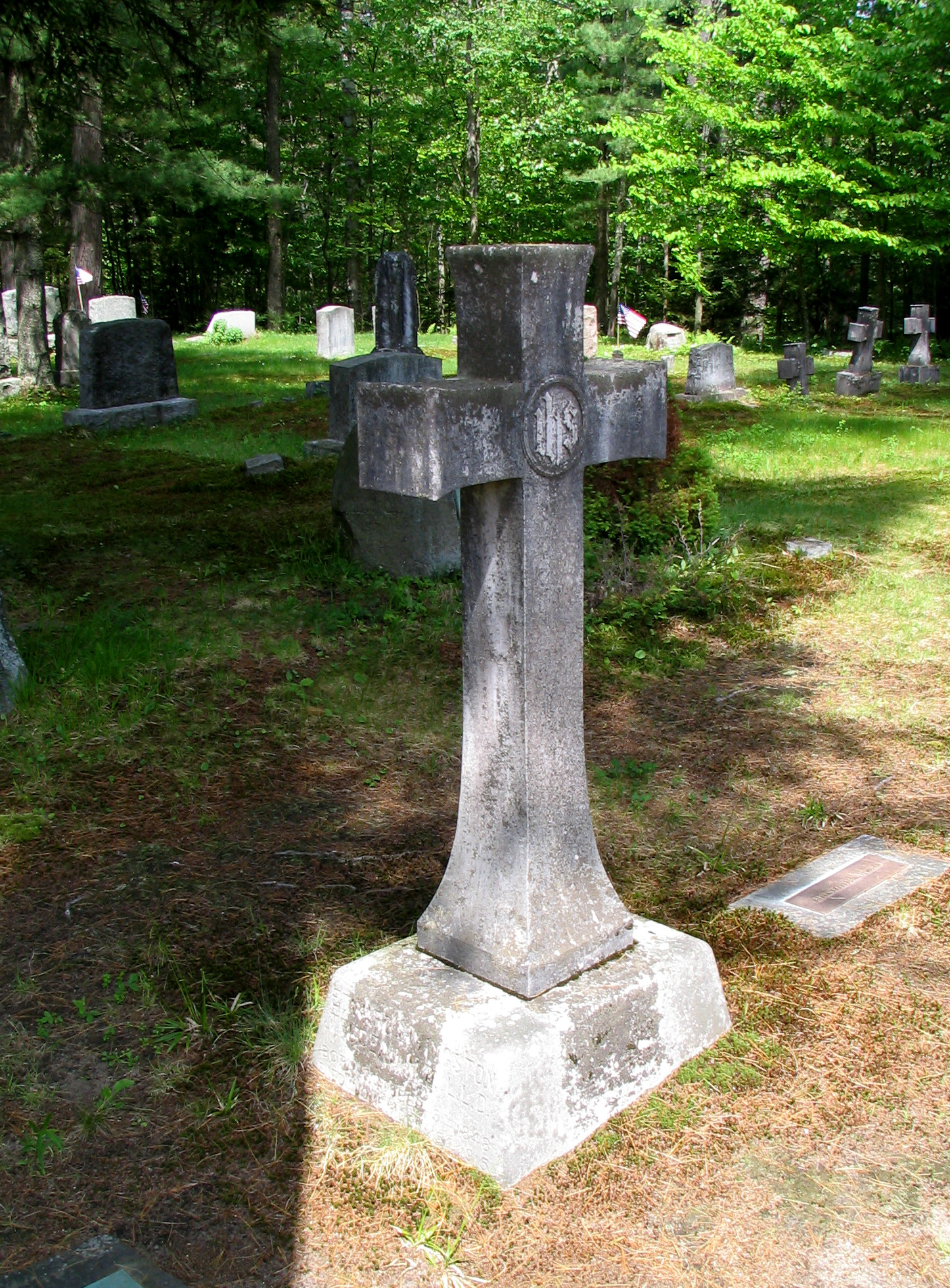
Dr. E L Trudeau gravestone

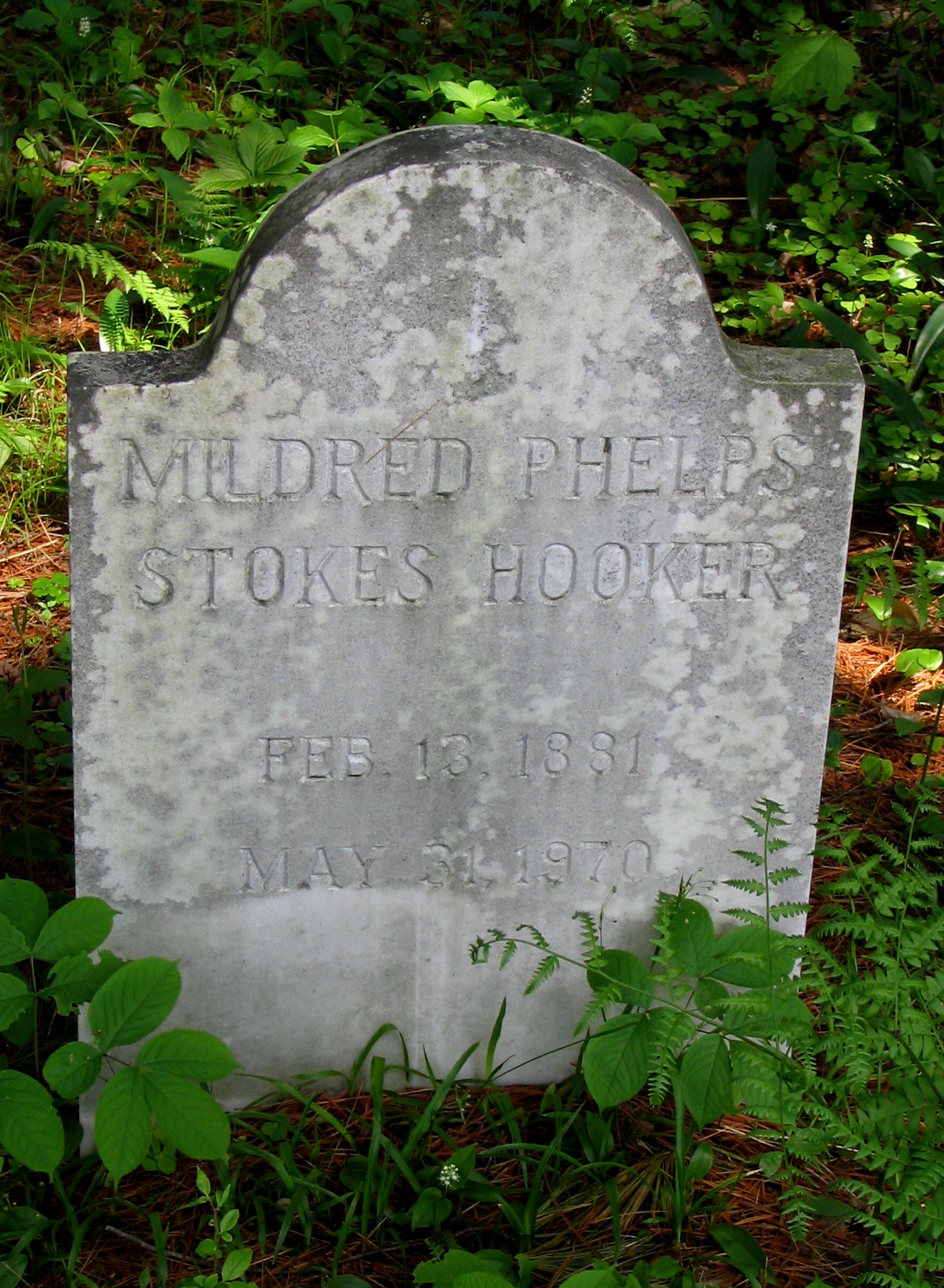
Mildred Phelps Stokes Hooker, daughter of Anson Phelps Stokes

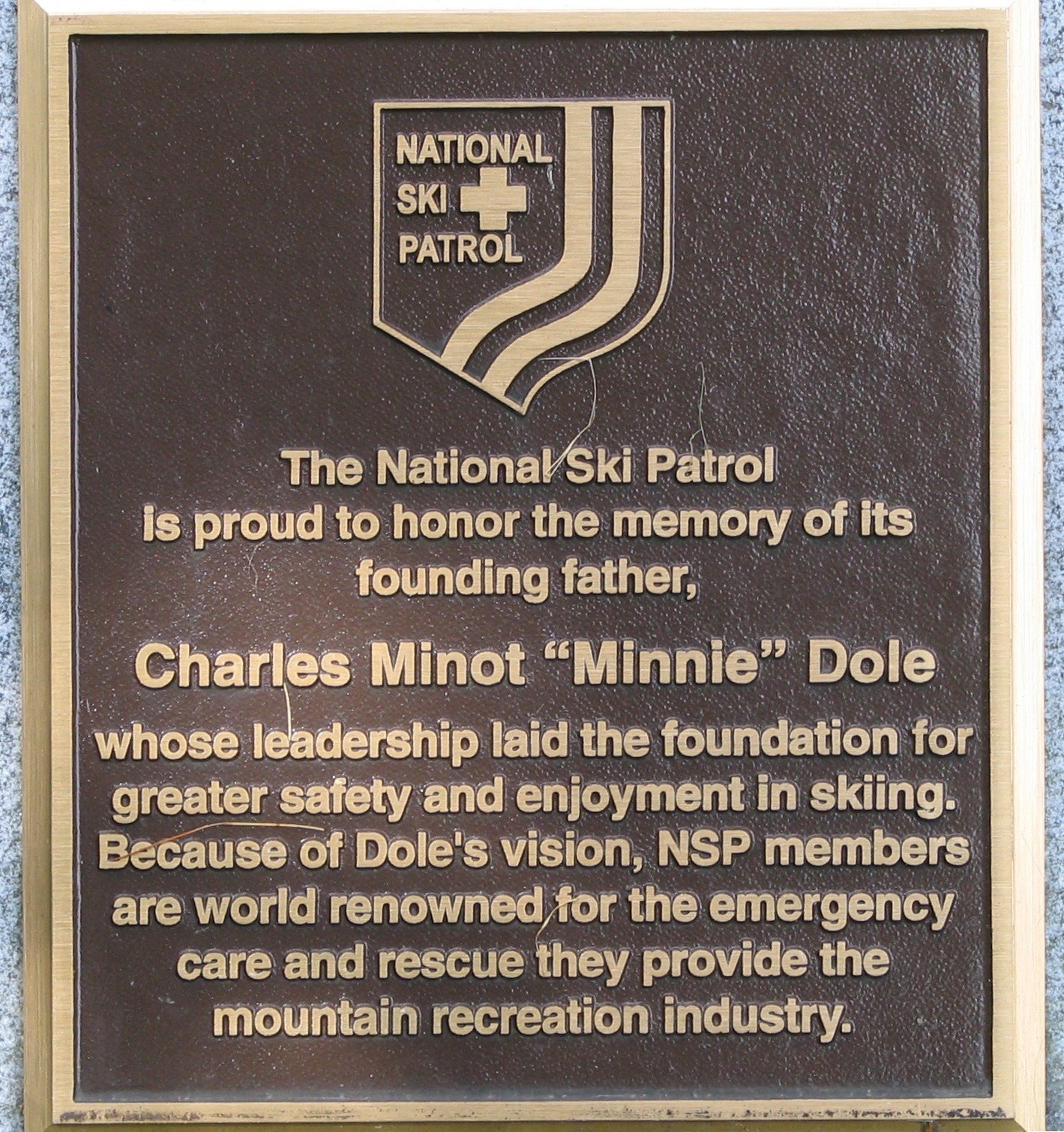
Charles Minot Dole grave marker
