= James Jolley =

James Jolley (c. 1813 – 28 November 1892) was a Scottish-born Canadian saddler, harnessmaker, and politician. He funded construction of the Jolley Cut, a mountain/lower city-access road in Hamilton, Ontario.

Born in Argyll, Scotland, Jolley first arrived Canada in about 1823, living first in Montreal for about twelve years before settling in Hamilton in about 1835. In 1843, he opened a shop selling saddles and harnesses on King Street East. Two years later, he expanded and moved to John Street South. By 1855, Jolley had one of the best equipped stores in western Ontario, selling saddles, horse-collars, harnesses, trunks, valises, whips, and horse-blankets. His son Charles became president of the firm in 1896.

Jolley died in 1892 in Hamilton at the age of 79. He is buried in Hamilton Cemetery.
