= William G. Distin =

American architect

- Born: February 25, 1884; Montreal, Quebec
- Died: March 23, 1970 (aged 86); Saranac Lake, New York
- Spouse: Ethel Evelyn Brown

William George Distin (February 25, 1884 – March 23, 1970), an architect of Saranac Lake, New York, was an early associate of Great Camp designer William L. Coulter who went on to design a number of Adirondack Great Camps.

Born in Plattsburgh, his family moved to Saranac Lake in 1889. After graduation from Saranac Lake High School in 1900, he was hired by William Coulter as a draftsman; his apprenticeship lasted six or seven years. After Coulter's death in 1907, Distin attended Columbia University, graduating in 1910. After a short period in Chicago, working for S. S. Beekman designing houses, he traveled for a time in Europe. Returning to Saranac Lake about 1912, he joined the successor to Coulter's architectural firm, run by Max H. Westhoff, Coulter's former partner. In 1917, Distin worked for the Army building hospitals in Washington, D.C. After the war, he returned to Saranac Lake to reopen Westhoff's firm, the latter having moved to Springfield, Massachusetts. In 1920, he designed Distin Cottage for his father, photographer William L. Distin.

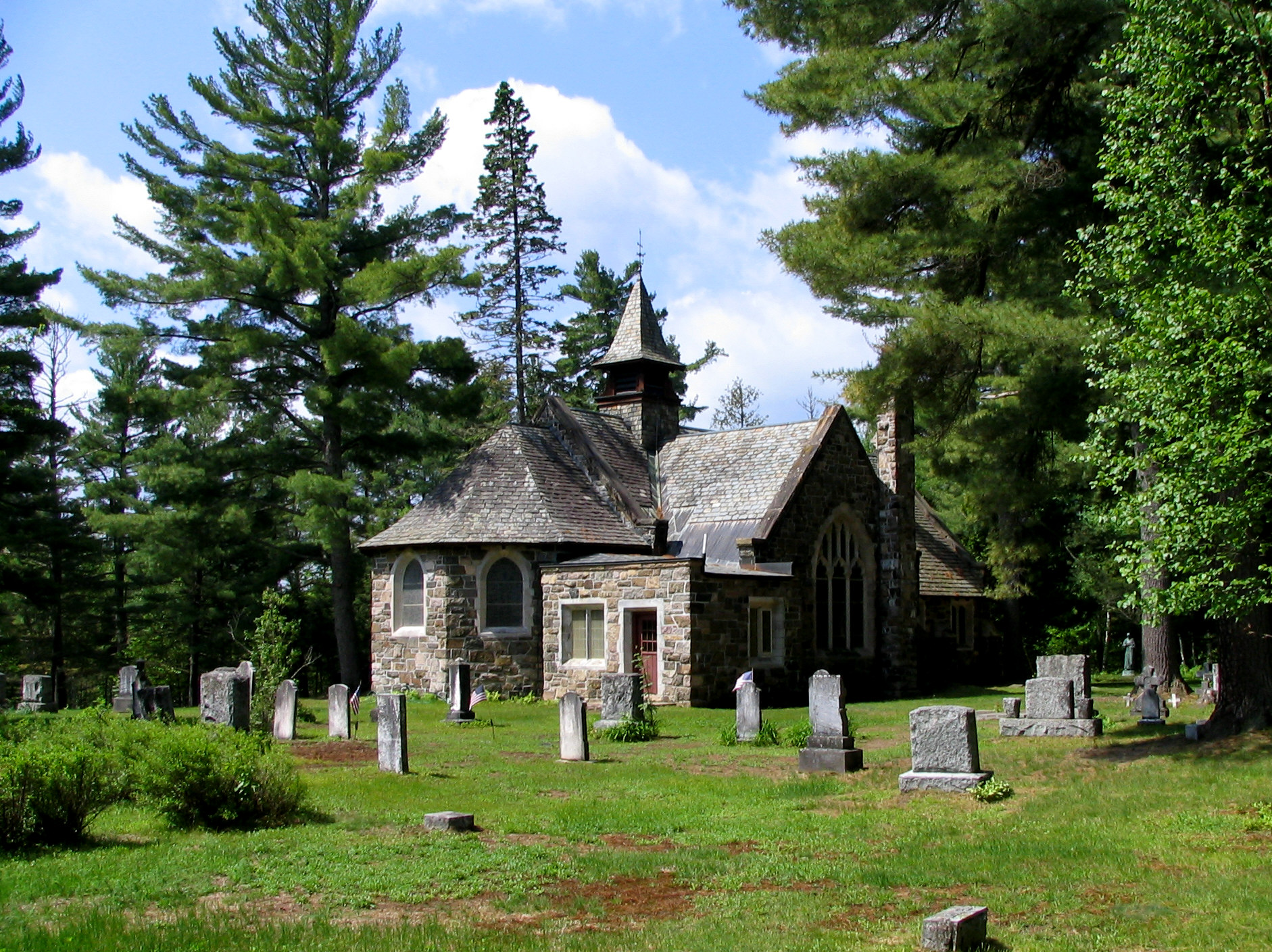
St. John’s in the Wilderness Episcopal Church, Paul Smiths, New York

He and his firm, Distin Wilson, designed the ice arena in Lake Placid for the 1932 Winter Olympics.

After some smaller commissions for camps on Upper Saranac Lake such as Camp Intermission, he designed Camp Wonundra for William Rockefeller in 1934. In 1937 he built "Eagle Nest" at Blue Mountain Lake for Walter Hochschild, in 1940 Debar Pond Lodge, and in 1948, Camp Minnowbrook, in the same area, for R.M. Hollingshead. There were also seven smaller great camps on Lake Placid, and work on the Lake Placid Club.

Distin also designed a number of notable churches, including St. John’s in the Wilderness Episcopal Church in Paul Smiths, Saint Barnards Catholic Church in Saranac Lake, Saint Eustace Episcopal Church in Lake Placid, and the Island Chapel, on Upper Saranac Lake. He also designed the replacement of the original Adirondak Loj, which burned in a catastrophic fire that swept Essex County in 1903.
