= William Doran =

Canadian politician

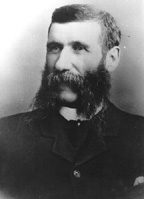
Mayor of Hamilton 1888–1889

William Doran (13 November 1834 – 12 November 1903) was a Canadian politician and businessman who served as mayor of Hamilton, Ontario, from 1888 to 1889.

== Early life ==
William Doran was born on 13 November 1834, in Grimsby, Ontario. His parents, Sylvester Doran and Elizabeth Doyle, had immigrated from Carlow, Ireland, in 1821. Sylvester was a stonemason and built their family home at 470 Main Street and later the Irish Roman Catholic Church on Patton Street. The family also began a farm where Doran had seven brothers and sisters: Michael, Edward, James, Peter, John, Eliza, and a sister who took the married name Hewitt.

Doran worked on the family farm and as a teacher, before moving to Hamilton with his brother Michael.

== Businesses ==
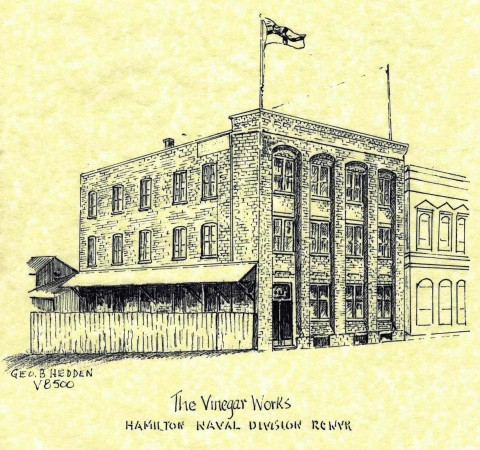
Dominion Vinegar Works

Doran and Michael started a grocery store on King Street East in Hamilton. In 1875, the brothers purchased the Dominion Vinegar Works at 41 Stuart Street. Newspaper records indicate that he also dealt in the sale and rental of properties from the 1860s through the 1890s.

== Politics ==
Doran displayed an interest in politics when he placed a local newspaper advertisement endorsing a Ward 5 Alderman in 1877. In 1879, Doran was elected to Hamilton City Council. He served as chairman of the hospital committee and continued as Alderman through 1882.

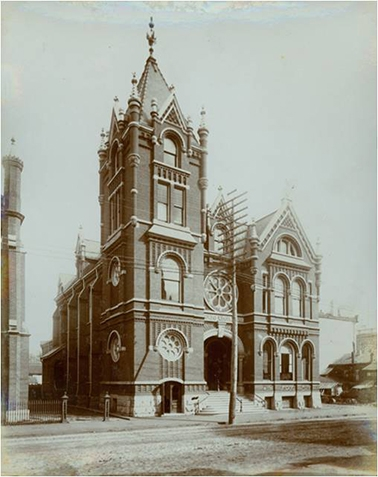
Hamilton Public Library

Doran was elected as chairman of the sewers committee in 1886. He was then elected Mayor of Hamilton, serving 1888–89. As mayor, he declared a half-holiday to allow workers to attend the city's 1889 Great Central Fair, which was reported to draw attendance in excess of 35,000 that day (This was the last such fair, the Crystal Palace exhibition ground being demolished in 1891). That year, he laid the cornerstone of the first Hamilton Public Library, the first purpose-built municipally funded public library in Canada. He served on the library committee in 1894 and was a member of the public library board in 1896.

In 1896, Doran made an unsuccessful campaign for the Dominion Parliament.

In 1894, Doran was elected to Hamilton city council as chairman of the board of works.

Doran retired from politics on 27 August 1901.

== Personal life ==
William Doran married Sarah Cecilia Morse (4 January 1848 – 28 February 1928) on September 16, 1868. Their children were Ethel M, Dr. William Doran of Detroit, Reginald M. (Peanial) of the Bank of Hamilton, Abishai (died 20 August 1873), Eveline, D. W. Alton (Berwick, ND), and Amy Cecilia.

Doran's brother James inherited their father's land and sold it in 1884. James built properties at 81, 83 and 85 Main Street East, and headed the Grimsby Manufacturing Company. He was appointed as high school trustee. Doran Avenue in Grimsby is named for their family.

== Death ==
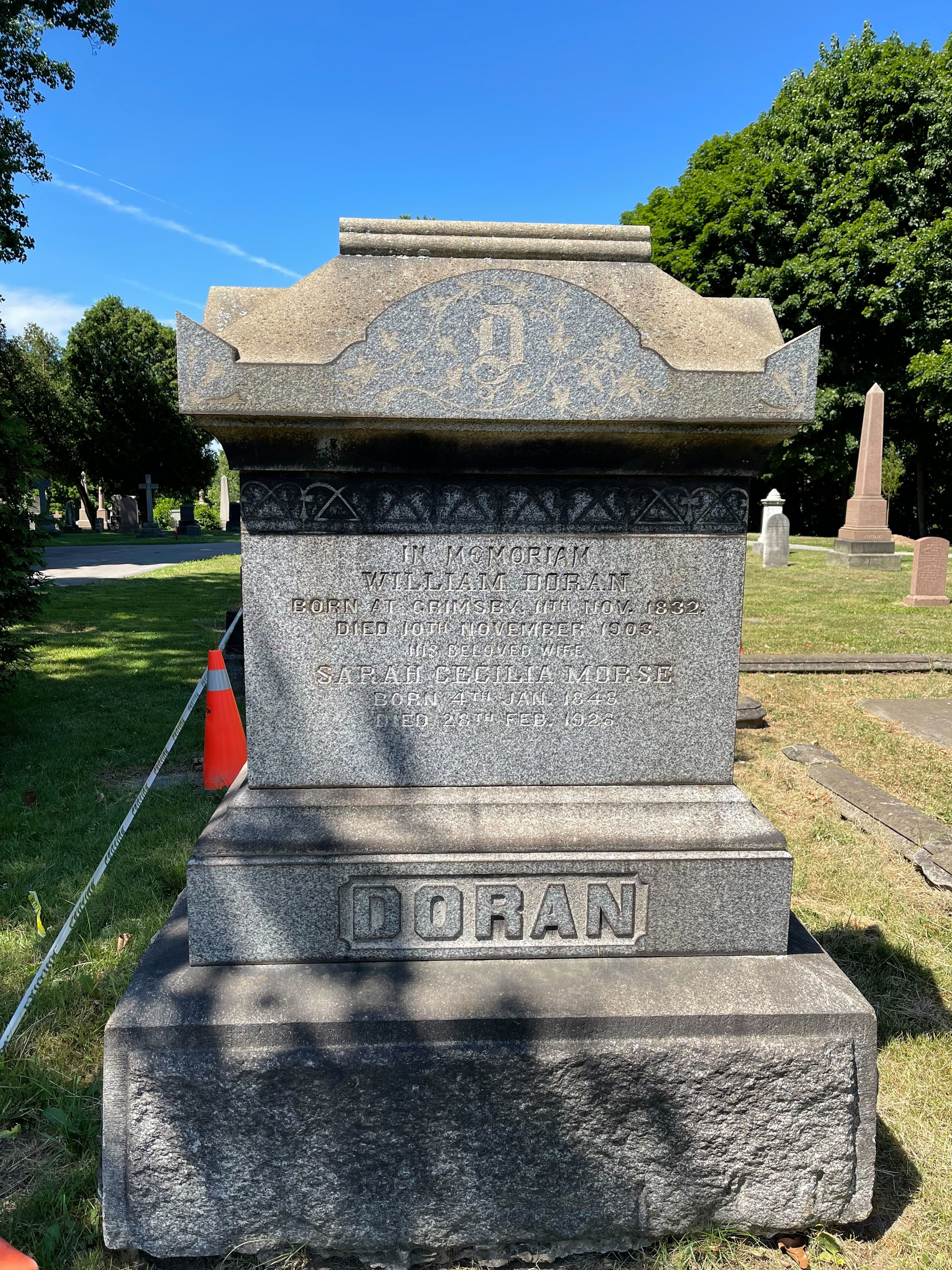
William Doran gravesite

In February 1903, Doran was diagnosed with stomach cancer. On 11 November 1903, he died from stomach cancer and pneumonia at this residence. His pallbearers were Adam Rutherford, Col. Moore, Horace Davis, Jas McClary, William Burkholder, and J. B. Turner. He was buried at the Hamilton Cemetery.
