= James Vernall Teetzel =

James Vernall Teetzel (March 6, 1853 - August 25, 1926) was mayor of Hamilton, Ontario, from 1899 to 1900.

Teetzel was born on March 6, 1853, in Fingal, Elgin County. He attended Woodstock College, Galt Collegiate Institute and Osgoode Hall, articling with Osler, Wink & Gwyn. In 1877, after four years in Hamilton, he was called to the bar and entered partnership with Britton Bath Osler.

He married Priscilla Grace Darling in 1880.

He was created Queen's Counsel in 1890 and on May 16, 1903, was elevated to the bench as Judge of the High Court, Common Pleas Division. In 1910 he became chairman of the Ontario Parole Board. Teetzel served as alderman in 1884, 1885 and 1896 and became mayor in 1899 and was returned by acclamation in 1900. During his term of office Dundurn Park was acquired and the Public Parks Act was put into effect in Hamilton establishing the Board of Parks Management. He retired from public life after a stroke in 1912 and traveled extensively until his death on August 25, 1926, in Barbados.
