= 1930 Hamilton, Ontario, municipal election =

Canadian municipal election

- Monday, December 1, 1930
Candidate	John Peebles
Party	Independent
Popular vote	Acclaimed
Mayor before election
John Peebles
Independent
Elected mayor
John Peebles
Independent

The 1930 Hamilton municipal election was held on December 1, 1930, to select one mayor, four controllers, and sixteen members of the Hamilton, Ontario, City Council, two from each of the city's eight wards. Voters also cast ballots for trustees for the public school board.

== Campaign ==
The 1930 campaign was marked by two major occurrences. The first was the absence of a vote on the city's Hydro Commissioner. Unlike in past elections, voters in Hamilton would not have the option to elect their representative to the publicly owned hydro-electric company for the city due to changes in provincial legislation that created an appointed board of three individuals to replace the single elected office of Commissioner. Attempting to de-politicize the office, Ontario's provincial government abolished the elected position and created a three-person board with appointees to be chosen by Queen's Park, city council, and the mayor.

The second event was the surprise nomination of local athlete Sam Manson for a seat on the Board of Control. Unbeknownst to any more than a dozen of Manson's closest friends, his nomination caught the city's local political establishment by surprise. When rumours of a last-minute entry began circulating city hall at 10:00 the morning of Friday, November 21, the city's sitting aldermen and controllers began questioning the city clerk. Refusing to reveal who the candidate was until five minutes before the close of nominations, the city clerk reportedly faced a "barrage of questioning" from local politicians.

Overall, interest in the election of 1930 was low, in part because of the worsening economic situation faced by Hamiltonians due to the Great Depression. The Hamilton Spectator reported that less than 30 people attended the traditional post-nomination speeches by candidates at city hall.

== Mayor ==
"Last, but not least, we must congratulate Mayor Peebles on the signal honour accorded him. Of course, it was never expected that any one would contest the mayoralty this year. Not only is it an unwritten law that a mayor must have a second term unopposed, but his worship has displayed so much acumen and foresight in his conduct of civic affairs during one of the worst periods of the city's history, that there is a general feeling that no other hand but his could as successfully pilot the civic ship out of the shoals of depression."

—

Mayor John Peebles, who had been acclaimed to his first term in 1929, was returned to a second-term by acclamation once more in 1930. In his nomination speech, Peebles spoke at length about the successes of his administration over the previous year, including the opening of McMaster University in Hamilton, improvements to the city's waterworks, and new facilities for the Canadian National Railway. In their summary of the city's nominations, the Spectator noted that "no other hand but [Peebles'] could as successfully pilot the civic ship out of the shoals of depression."

Summary of the December 1, 1930 Hamilton, Ontario mayoral election
Candidate	Affiliation	Popular vote		
Candidate	Affiliation	Votes	%	±%
John Peebles (incumbent)	Independent	Acclaimed		
Total votes		n/a	n/a	
Registered voters		n/a	n/a	n/a
Note: Candidate campaign colours are used as a visual differentiation between candidates and to indicate affiliation.
Sources: "Sam R. Manson is real dark horse", Hamilton Spectator, Friday, November 21, 1930, pg. 7.

== Board of Control ==
Summary of the December 1, 1930 Hamilton, Ontario Board of Control election
Candidate	Affiliation	Popular vote		
Candidate	Affiliation	Votes	%	±%
Sam Manson	Independent	15,413	n/a	n/a
Donald MacFarlane (incumbent)	Independent Conservative	14,866	n/a	n/a
Cranmer Riselay	Independent	13,033	n/a	n/a
Sam Lawrence (incumbent)	Independent Labour Party	12,639	n/a	n/a
John Henry Ball	Independent	12,302	n/a	n/a
Thomas O'Heir	Independent	7,235	n/a	n/a
Total votes		n/a	n/a	
Registered voters		n/a	n/a	n/a
Note: Candidate campaign colours are used as a visual differentiation between candidates and to indicate affiliation.
Sources: "Board of Control Summary", Hamilton Spectator, Tuesday, December 2, 1930, pp. 10.

== Aldermen ==
=== Ward One ===
Summary of the December 1, 1930 Hamilton, Ontario Ward One aldermanic election
Candidate	Affiliation	Popular vote		
Candidate	Affiliation	Votes	%	±%
William MacFarland (incumbent)	Independent	3,601	n/a	n/a
Herbert Wilton	Independent	2,055	n/a	n/a
Fred Brooks	Independent	1,903	n/a	n/a
Total votes		n/a	n/a	
Registered voters		n/a	n/a	n/a
Note: Candidate campaign colours are used as a visual differentiation between candidates and to indicate affiliation.
Sources: "How Aldermanic Candidates Ran", Hamilton Spectator, Tuesday, December 2, 1930, pp. 10.

=== Ward Two ===
Summary of the December 1, 1930 Hamilton, Ontario Ward Two aldermanic election
Candidate	Affiliation	Popular vote		
Candidate	Affiliation	Votes	%	±%
Thomas Wright (incumbent)	Independent	1,834	n/a	n/a
Gordon Flett (incumbent)	Independent	1,719	n/a	n/a
William Ainsley	Independent Liberal	1,508	n/a	n/a
Total votes		n/a	n/a	
Registered voters		n/a	n/a	n/a
Note: Candidate campaign colours are used as a visual differentiation between candidates and to indicate affiliation.
Sources: "How Aldermanic Candidates Ran", Hamilton Spectator, Tuesday, December 2, 1930, pp. 10.

=== Ward Three ===
Summary of the December 1, 1930 Hamilton, Ontario Ward Three aldermanic election
Candidate	Affiliation	Popular vote		
Candidate	Affiliation	Votes	%	±%
William Hutton (incumbent)	Independent	2,369	n/a	n/a
D'Arcy Argue Martin (incumbent)	Independent	2,313	n/a	n/a
Austin Macaulay	Independent	1,264	n/a	n/a
Henry Bush	Independent	604	n/a	n/a
Total votes		n/a	n/a	
Registered voters		n/a	n/a	n/a
Note: Candidate campaign colours are used as a visual differentiation between candidates and to indicate affiliation.
Sources: "How Aldermanic Candidates Ran", Hamilton Spectator, Tuesday, December 2, 1930, pp. 10.

=== Ward Four ===
Summary of the December 1, 1930 Hamilton, Ontario Ward Four aldermanic election
Candidate	Affiliation	Popular vote		
Candidate	Affiliation	Votes	%	±%
William Thompson (incumbent)	Independent	1,284	n/a	n/a
Arthur Davidson	Independent	1,194	n/a	n/a
George Hancock	Independent	1,191	n/a	n/a
Peter Cheeseman	Independent	822	n/a	n/a
Percy Wright	Independent	448	n/a	n/a
Harry Penton	Independent Labour Party	393	n/a	n/a
Frederick Flatman	Independent	153	n/a	n/a
Henry Roberts	Independent	141	n/a	n/a
Total votes		n/a	n/a	
Registered voters		n/a	n/a	n/a
Note: Candidate campaign colours are used as a visual differentiation between candidates and to indicate affiliation.
Sources: "How Aldermanic Candidates Ran", Hamilton Spectator, Tuesday, December 2, 1930, pp. 10.

=== Ward Five ===
Summary of the December 1, 1930 Hamilton, Ontario Ward Five aldermanic election
Candidate	Affiliation	Popular vote		
Candidate	Affiliation	Votes	%	±%
John Sherring (incumbent)	Independent	1,500	n/a	n/a
Charles Aitchison (incumbent)	Independent Labour Party	1,482	n/a	n/a
Albert Marck	Independent	993	n/a	n/a
Michael Cummings	Independent	490	n/a	n/a
Fred Amos	Independent	293	n/a	n/a
Total votes		n/a	n/a	
Registered voters		n/a	n/a	n/a
Note: Candidate campaign colours are used as a visual differentiation between candidates and to indicate affiliation.
Sources: "How Aldermanic Candidates Ran", Hamilton Spectator, Tuesday, December 2, 1930, pp. 10.

=== Ward Six ===
Summary of the December 2, 1930 Hamilton, Ontario Ward Six aldermanic election
Candidate	Affiliation	Popular vote		
Candidate	Affiliation	Votes	%	±%
Archie Pollock (incumbent)	Independent Labour Party	2,030	n/a	n/a
John Hodgson (incumbent)	Independent	1,669	n/a	n/a
Vernon Barker	Independent	1,035	n/a	n/a
Charles Avery	Independent	339	n/a	n/a
William Wardley	Independent	294	n/a	n/a
Total votes		n/a	n/a	
Registered voters		n/a	n/a	n/a
Note: Candidate campaign colours are used as a visual differentiation between candidates and to indicate affiliation.
Sources: "How Aldermanic Candidates Ran", Hamilton Spectator, Tuesday, December 2, 1930, pp. 10.

=== Ward Seven ===
Summary of the December 1, 1930 Hamilton, Ontario Ward Seven aldermanic election
Candidate	Affiliation	Popular vote		
Candidate	Affiliation	Votes	%	±%
Samuel Clarke (incumbent)	Independent Labour Party	2,091	n/a	n/a
Archie Burton (incumbent)	Independent	1,694	n/a	n/a
Paul Oliveri	Independent	600	n/a	n/a
William Patterson	Independent	365	n/a	n/a
Total votes		n/a	n/a	
Registered voters		n/a	n/a	n/a
Note: Candidate campaign colours are used as a visual differentiation between candidates and to indicate affiliation.
Sources: "How Aldermanic Candidates Ran", Hamilton Spectator, Tuesday, December 2, 1930, pp. 10.

== Board of education ==
=== Ward One ===
Summary of the December 1, 1930 Hamilton, Ontario Board of Education Ward One trustee election
Candidate	Affiliation	Popular vote		
Candidate	Affiliation	Votes	%	±%
George Cameron Gage (incumbent)	Independent	3,595	80.2%	n/a
George Thornewell	Independent Labour Party	887	19.8%	n/a
Total votes		4,482	n/a	
Registered voters		n/a	n/a	n/a
Note: Candidate campaign colours are used as a visual differentiation between candidates and to indicate affiliation.
Sources: "School Trustees", Hamilton Spectator, Tuesday, December 2, 1930, pg. 10.

=== Ward Two ===
Summary of the December 1, 1930 Hamilton, Ontario Board of Education Ward Two trustee election
Candidate	Affiliation	Popular vote		
Candidate	Affiliation	Votes	%	±%
Dr. J. W. Bell	Independent	Acclaimed		
Total votes		n/a	n/a	
Registered voters		n/a	n/a	n/a
Note: Candidate campaign colours are used as a visual differentiation between candidates and to indicate affiliation.
Sources: "School Trustees", Hamilton Spectator, Tuesday, December 2, 1930, pg. 10.

=== Ward Three ===
Summary of the December 1, 1930 Hamilton, Ontario Board of Education Ward Three trustee election
Candidate	Affiliation	Popular vote		
Candidate	Affiliation	Votes	%	±%
George Ballard	Independent	Acclaimed		
Total votes		n/a	n/a	
Registered voters		n/a	n/a	n/a
Note: Candidate campaign colours are used as a visual differentiation between candidates and to indicate affiliation.
Sources: "School Trustees", Hamilton Spectator, Tuesday, December 2, 1930, pg. 10.

=== Ward Four ===
Summary of the December 1, 1930 Hamilton, Ontario Board of Education Ward Four trustee election
Candidate	Affiliation	Popular vote		
Candidate	Affiliation	Votes	%	±%
Emerson Mealley	Independent	Acclaimed		
Total votes		n/a	n/a	
Registered voters		n/a	n/a	n/a
Note: Candidate campaign colours are used as a visual differentiation between candidates and to indicate affiliation.
Sources: "School Trustees", Hamilton Spectator, Tuesday, December 2, 1930, pg. 10.

=== Ward Five ===
Summary of the December 1, 1930 Hamilton, Ontario Board of Education Ward Five trustee election
Candidate	Affiliation	Popular vote		
Candidate	Affiliation	Votes	%	±%
Thomas Binkley (incumbent)	Independent	1,418	61.76%	n/a
Charles Levinson	Independent	878	38.24%	n/a
Total votes		2,296	n/a	
Registered voters		n/a	n/a	n/a
Note: Candidate campaign colours are used as a visual differentiation between candidates and to indicate affiliation.
Sources: "School Trustees", Hamilton Spectator, Tuesday, December 2, 1930, pg. 10.

=== Ward Six ===
Summary of the December 1, 1930 Hamilton, Ontario Board of Education Ward Six trustee election
Candidate	Affiliation	Popular vote		
Candidate	Affiliation	Votes	%	±%
Frank Robbins	Independent	Acclaimed		
Total votes		n/a	n/a	
Registered voters		n/a	n/a	n/a
Note: Candidate campaign colours are used as a visual differentiation between candidates and to indicate affiliation.
Sources: "School Trustees", Hamilton Spectator, Tuesday, December 2, 1930, pg. 10.

=== Ward Seven ===
Summary of the December 1, 1930 Hamilton, Ontario Board of Education Ward Seven trustee election
Candidate	Affiliation	Popular vote		
Candidate	Affiliation	Votes	%	±%
Orville Walsh	Independent	1,483	58.36%	n/a
James Reed	Independent Labour Party	1,058	41.64%	n/a
Total votes		2,541	n/a	
Registered voters		n/a	n/a	n/a
Note: Candidate campaign colours are used as a visual differentiation between candidates and to indicate affiliation.
Sources: "School Trustees", Hamilton Spectator, Tuesday, December 2, 1930, pg. 10.

=== Ward Eight ===
Summary of the December 1, 1930 Hamilton, Ontario Board of Education Ward Eight trustee election
Candidate	Affiliation	Popular vote		
Candidate	Affiliation	Votes	%	±%
Agnes Sharpe	Independent Labour Party	2,375	70.12%	n/a
Emmett Scarlett	Independent	1,012	29.88%	n/a
Total votes		3,387	n/a	
Registered voters		n/a	n/a	n/a
Note: Candidate campaign colours are used as a visual differentiation between candidates and to indicate affiliation.
Sources: "School Trustees", Hamilton Spectator, Tuesday, December 2, 1930, pg. 10.
