= John Milne (Canadian politician) =

Canadian politician

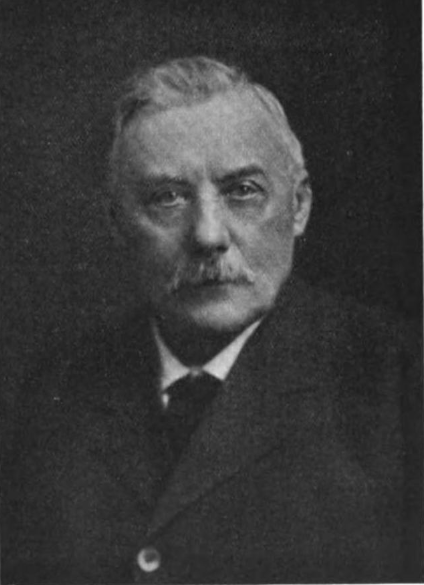

Canadian Senator from Ontario
- In office 1915–1922

Personal details
- Born: January 22, 1839 Aberdeen, Scotland
- Died: March 4, 1922 (aged 83) Hamilton, Ontario, Canada
- Party: Conservative
- Occupation: Businessman; politician

John Milne (January 22, 1839 – March 4, 1922) was a Canadian iron moulder, businessman and Senator.

Milne was president and managing director of Burrow, Stewart and Milne, a Hamilton, Ontario foundry company that manufactured stoves and was also president or director of several other Hamilton area concerns. He was also involved with municipal governance as one of the city's first hydro commissioners and also served as an appointee on various other municipal boards.

He was appointed to the Senate in 1915 by Sir Robert Borden and sat as a Conservative.

== Background ==
Milne was born in Aberdeen, Scotland. He left school at the age of 14 to apprentice as an iron moulder. In 1854, he immigrated with his family to Ontario and Milne joined Gurneys and Carpenter where he continued his training.

After attempting to establish his own business, he joined Hamilton Malleable Iron Works in 1867 as a moulder and became partner in 1872 in what became Burrow, Stewart, and Milne. In the early years the company made castings for harness equipment and saddlery gear such as curry-combs, but soon shifted focus shifted to scales and stoves producing the Jewel and Victory lines of stoves and ranges which were sold across Canada.

In order to support his business, he became involved with the steel industry and is credited with bringing about the merger of several steel companies to found the Steel Company of Canada (Stelco).

Milne also supported the construction of public libraries in Hamilton serving on the library board from 1903 to 1921 and as chairman of the building and finance committee from 1911 to 1912.

Milne was a supporter of Sir John A. Macdonald's National Policy, believing in protectionism for Canadian industries, and joined the Conservative Party in 1876 and served as president of Hamilton's Conservative Association for 23 years.

During his seven years in the Senate, Milne spoke on the issues of manufacturing, supported tariffs against foreign imports, and spoke against trade unionism.
