= Henry McKinstry =

Henry McKinstry (born 1805, County Antrim, Ireland – died April 17, 1871) was mayor of Hamilton, Ontario from 1859 to 1861. He presided over the arrangements for the visit of Edward, Prince of Wales to the city in 1860, the first royal visit in Hamilton's history.
