= Colin Campbell Ferrie =

Canadian politician (1808–1856)

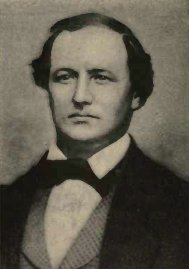

1st Mayor of Hamilton, Ontario
- In office 1847–1847
- Succeeded by: George Sylvester Tiffany

Member of the Legislative Assembly of Upper Canada for Hamilton
- In office 1836–1841

Personal details
- Born: May 1, 1808 Glasgow, Scotland
- Died: November 9, 1856 (aged 48) Hamilton, Upper Canada
- Resting place: Hamilton Cemetery
- Spouse: Catherine Beasley (1836)
- Relations: Adam Ferrie, father Richard Beasley, father-in-law

Colin Campbell Ferrie (May 1, 1808 – November 9, 1856) was a Canadian merchant, banker, and politician.

Born in Glasgow, the son of Adam Ferrie and Rachel Campbell, he came to Montreal from Scotland in 1824 to work in his father's new wholesale and forwarding company. By 1829, Colin, his brother Adam and his father had joined forces to supply and run a store in Hamilton, Upper Canada, under the name of Colin Ferrie and Company. He married Catherine Beasley in 1836, and they had two sons.

From 1829 to 1833, additional stores were opened in places such as Brantford, Preston, Nelson, Dundas, and Waterloo. A founder of the Gore Bank, Ferrie was its second president from 1839 until his death in 1856. He was the first mayor of Hamilton and served in 1847. Ferrie also represented Hamilton in the Legislative Assembly of Upper Canada from 1836 to 1841.

He died in Hamilton, Canada West in 1856 and was buried in Hamilton Cemetery.

== Hamilton Spectator Article ==
The following appeared in the Hamilton Spectator's 170th anniversary special edition. See more from the project .

Hamilton businessman Colin Campbell Ferrie (1808-1856) was appointed Hamilton's first mayor in 1847 and served for one year. Ferrie was also known for his sprawling estate at Queen and York that was called West Lawn. It was built in 1836 and demolished in 1957 by Tuckett Tobacco Co. Ltd. According to an article in The Spectator from Jan. 21, 1947, "The old York street trail was selected by several prominent citizens of Hamilton as the site for their fine new homes. Crowning the height, Dundurn Castle eclipsed them all, but another palatial residence to the east ran a close second. At York and Queen streets was West Lawn, the home of Colin C. Ferrie, Hamilton's first mayor."

=== Significance ===
Ferrie was a major player in local commerce and was a founding member of the Hamilton Board of Trade that was formed in 1845. As mayor, he is remembered for focusing his attention on improving the local economy. He arranged civic financing from the Gore Bank and tried to prepare the city for an anticipated wave of poor and sick Irish immigrants fleeing the Great Famine of Ireland.

=== Timeline ===
1808: Born in Glasgow, moving to Montreal in 1824 to work at his father's wholesale business.

1929: Formed his own company with his brother Adam in Hamilton, called Colin Ferrie and Company. The business expanded and opened several stores in communities around Hamilton.

1836-1841: He became a founder of the Gore Bank and represented Hamilton in the Legislative Assembly of Upper Canada.

Jan. 16, 1847: Ferrie began his one-year appointment as the newly incorporated city's first mayor. (The first elected mayor in Hamilton was William McKinstry in 1859. Only men were allowed to vote because women's suffrage didn't happen until more than 50 years later).

1850s: After his mayoral term, he ran into financial problems after a series of setbacks that included two vessels carrying company goods sinking in Lake Ontario.

1856: After a meeting with officials from the Gore Bank, he collapsed and later died of "an enlargement of the heart." He was 48. Many at the time attributed his demise to the stress he was under from his failing business interests.

=== Ferrie Street ===
Ferrie Street is named after Colin Campbell Ferrie. It runs in sections between Cheever and Bay streets.
