= William G. Kerr =

Canadian politician

William G. Kerr grocer, politician; born in 1814 or 1815 in the United States; married Martha - died between 1858 and 1862. He was mayor of Hamilton, Ontario in 1853.

By the early 1850s William G. Kerr was a grocer in Hamilton with a store on King Street W., between MacNab and Charles streets.

Kerr was elected alderman for St. George's ward in 1853. He became Hamilton's seventh mayor in the same year under unusual circumstances. When the previous mayor, Nehemiah Ford, refused to stand for a second term, Milton Davis moved that the alderman choose Kerr as mayor; Kerr himself seconded the motion. The council vote resulted in a tie, so Andrew Miller, the councillor listed highest on the assessment rates, cast the deciding vote in favour of Kerr. Kerr also served on the board of trustees for Common Schools in 1855 and 1858. He was Methodist.

Kerr died on May 20, 1861.
