= Benjamin Ernest Charlton =

Canadian politician

Benjamin Ernest Charlton (April 12, 1835 - March 12, 1901) was born in Brant County, Upper Canada. He was the mayor of Hamilton, Ontario twice; in 1867 and from 1873 to 1874. In addition to his activities as a politician, Charlton was also a teacher and manufacturer.

Charlton is buried in Hamilton Cemetery.

== Tribute ==
Charlton Avenue, a street in the lower city of Hamilton, Ontario, was named after him.
