= Adam Hope =

Canadian politician

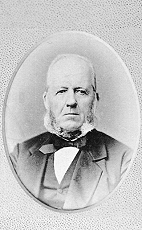
Adam Hope

Adam Hope (8 January 1813 – 7 August 1882) was a Canadian businessman and senator. Born to a prosperous Scottish tenant farming family in Dirleton parish, Adam Hope worked as a clerk in a sawmill in Leith, the port of Edinburgh, from 1828 until emigrating to North America. He migrated from Scotland in 1834, settling in Upper Canada. Adam Hope sent his father sixty-six letters, vivid and detailed, which trace Hope's passage across the Atlantic and efforts to settle in Upper Canada. A Liberal, he was appointed to the Senate of Canada on 3 January 1877 on the recommendation of Alexander Mackenzie. He represented the senatorial division of Hamilton, Ontario until his death. In 2007, Adam Crerar edited the selected letters of Adam Hope, written to his father in Scotland between 1834 and 1845. This collection of letters totals approximately 200,000 words, and represents one of the single richest accounts of Upper Canada in the 1830s and 1840s, touching on telling aspects of colonial politics, religion, society, economics, and communications. This edited compilation was published as part of the Champlain Society's General Series.
