= Hutchison Clark =

Canadian politician

Hutchison Clark (August 29, 1806 – February 17, 1877) was mayor of Hamilton, Ontario, in 1868.
