= John James Mason =

Canadian politician

John James Mason (4 February 1842 – 15 June 1903) was mayor of Hamilton, Ontario from 1884 to 1885. As mayor, he created a registry of those seeking work in order to connect them to potential employers, supported the establishment of a free library, and said he "personally reviewed almost every application for relief [for the poor], and [had] succeeded in bestowing charity where it was needed and been able to refuse those who were undeserving of it". After his term as mayor, he remained involved in politics, securing funding from the Minister of Education for the trial implementation of home economics classes in a local school in 1897, arguing that it would help decide whether to include it in the curriculum. The Minister of Education allowed school boards to teach home economics later that year. Mason was also connected with the movement establish a branch of the Victorian Order of Nurses in Hamilton, in order to provide healthcare to those who could not afford private care, in 1899. He strongly opposed prohibition, saying he preferred a liquor license law because outright prohibition would result in outright disregard for the law, and because he saw nothing wrong with the sale of alcohol in public spaces (he was even the treasurer and a principal shareholder of the Grant-Lottridge Brewing Company). Mason was also involved with the Anglican church, being a delegate to the General Synod of the Anglican Church of Canada and honorary lay secretary of the provincial synod. He was the head of his own accounting firm from 1966 to 1874, after which he sold his share to his partner Ralph Leeming Gunn.

== Freemasonry ==
Mason was an active freemason.

In 1874, he was voted Grand Secretary of the Masonic Grand Lodge of Canada.

He was also the Provincial Warden for Canada of the Royal Order of Scotland, First Principal of the Grand Chapter, and Grand Registrar of the Great Priory of Canada.
