= James Cummings (Ontario politician) =

Canadian politician

James Cummings businessman, politician; born in 1815 in Ireland; married Anne Morrison, and they had three children; died 13 April 1894 at Hamilton, Ontario, buried at Hamilton Cemetery. He was mayor of Hamilton, Ontario, Canada for three months in 1854 and in 1856.

James Cummings emigrated to Canada as a young man. He lived briefly in Montreal, Quebec before coming to Hamilton in the 1830s and 1840s where he established a successful wholesale crockery business. Cummings had other business interests. He was president of the Canadian Oil Company in 1870 and was in partnership with J.M. Williams.

Cummings was elected to city council as an alderman in 1854. Following a rather bizarre election in which all ten aldermen were successfully nominated and defeated, Cummings was chosen as mayor. The election was declared invalid, however, and he served for only three months. In 1875, he was appointed tax collector, a position he filled until his death.

A self-educated man with a fondness for literature, Cummings devoted himself to the public school system. He was a school trustee and acted as chairman of the Board of Education from 1863 to 1875. During his tenure the two-hour recess and the monthly fee system to purchase free school supplies were introduced. He also carefully supervised the construction and repair of school buildings. Cummings served on the Board of Education for over thirty years.

Cummings was a member of the Irish Protestant Benevolent Society and of Central Presbyterian Church. He died at his residence.
