= Robert McElroy (Ontario politician) =

Robert McElroy was mayor of Hamilton, Ontario from 1862 to 1864.
