= George Roach =

Canadian politician

George Roach was a Canadian politician and the mayor of Hamilton, Ontario from 1875 to 1876.
