= Wellington Jeffers Morden =

Canadian politician (1837–1928)

Wellington Jeffers Morden (September 28, 1837 – December 26, 1928) was mayor of Hamilton, Ontario, Canada, from 1902 to 1903.
