= James Edwin O'Reilly =

Canadian mayor of Hamilton (1833–1907)

James Edwin O'Reilly was mayor of Hamilton, Ontario in 1869, and from 1879 to 1881. He lived from 1833-1907, and was a lay leader at Christ's Church Cathedral, an Anglican church, by the year 1899. He belonged to a temperance organisation, the Royal Templars of Temperance, but was not an active member.
