= William Burton (Canadian politician) =

Canadian politician (1888–1944)

William Burton (December 25, 1888 – October 16, 1944) was a Canadian politician who served as mayor of Hamilton, Ontario, from 1928 to 1929. During the First World War, he served as an officer in the Canadian Expeditionary Force.

== Early life ==
Born in Derby, England, Burton trained and qualified as a surveyor and architect. He emigrated to Hamilton, Canada, in 1907.

== Career ==
He subsequently established the Burton Coal Company.

Enlisting in the 120th City of Hamilton Battalion upon the outbreak of World War I, he became the first private in his unit to be commissioned, and rose to the rank of captain. He later joined the 2nd Battalion of the Royal Hamilton Light Infantry.

In 1924, he was elected as the alderman for Ward 6. He was re-elected to that post in 1925. He served the following two years on the Board of Control.

In December 1927, Burton was elected mayor with one of the largest majorities ever achieved by a mayoral candidate in Hamilton in a two-way race. His victory over long-time board of control member Calvin Davis, following only one week of campaigning, was widely regarded as an "upset". The following year, he was returned to office uncontested.

He served as mayor of Hamilton in 1928 and 1929. During his second year in office, he supported a program to employ war veterans who were amputees as school traffic officers.

== Personal life and death ==
Burton was elected president of the Victoria Curling Club in March 1944. He died on October 16 of that year in the Hamilton General Hospital.

He was a member of the choir at St. Paul's Anglican Church in Westdale. Prior to that, he had been a member of the Church of St. Thomas for many years.
