= William L. Distin =

Canadian politician

3rd Mayor of Hamilton, Ontario
- In office 1849–1849
- Preceded by: George Sylvester Tiffany
- Succeeded by: John Fisher

Personal details
- Born: August 1789 England
- Died: September 30, 1879 (aged 90) Hamilton, Upper Canada

William L. Distin (August 1789 – September 30, 1879) was a Canadian municipal politician. He was mayor of Hamilton, Ontario in 1849.

Born in England, little is known of the life of William L. Distin. He first appears as an active member of the Hamilton community in 1849, when he was elected mayor and served on the building committee of Christ's Church. From 1849 until 1853 he was chairman of the board of trustees for Common Schools, and in that capacity he presided at the opening of Central School 2 May 1853. A supporter of Sir Allan MacNab, he is believed to have lived on King Street West, until his death in 1858.
