= Peter Campbell Blaicher =

Mayor of Hamilton, Ontario

Peter Campbell Blaicher (August 1, 1835 – March 20, 1900) was mayor of Hamilton, Ontario from 1892 to 1893.
