= George Hamilton Mills =

Canadian politician

George Hamilton Mills (November 20, 1827 – August 16, 1901) was Mayor of Hamilton, Province of Canada in 1858.

Mills was lawyer and was called to the bar in 1851. He was elected as alderman for St. George's Ward in 1857, 1858, 1869 to 1872 and 1877. In 1858, he was chosen to serve as Mayor and served one term only.

As Mayor, Mills was instrumental in securing a loan to maintain the city's credit.
