= John Rose Holden =

Canadian politician and lawyer

John Rose Holden (sometimes called Rose-Holden) (27 September 1821 – 25 February 1879) was a Canadian politician and lawyer. He was mayor of Hamilton, Canada West in 1851.

Born in Daventry, Northamptonshire, England, John Rose Holden was the son of a wealthy Church of England clergyman. Little is known of his early life, but he is believed to have come to Canada at an early age. He was well educated in both English and French, and studied law with Judge Campbell at Niagara, Upper Canada. After being called to the bar, he entered a partnership with Richard Oliver Duggan (for whom Whitehern was built) in Hamilton, enjoying a lucrative practice. He was married to Mary Emily Roach and had two sons and three daughters.

Holden served on the city council for many years. He was elected mayor in 1851, the year in which a new system of elections was introduced; two aldermen, two councillors, one inspector of houses of public entertainment, and one school trustee were elected for each ward. As mayor, Holden represented Hamilton at the Boston Jubilee. A freemason, Holden became affiliated with Barton Lodge on 27 November 1844. He was active, along with his wife, in the Wentworth Historical Society. He was also a member of St. Mark's Church (Anglican), donating its first communion vessels. The church contains a plaque to him and his wife.

He died in Hamilton, Ontario in 1879.
