= 1988 Hamilton, Ontario, municipal election =

Municipal election in Canada

1988 Hamilton municipal election
- November 14, 1988
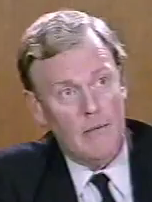
Candidate	Robert Morrow	Michael Baldasaro
Popular vote	74,969	7,528
Percentage	90.87%	9.12%
Mayor before election
Robert Morrow
Elected mayor
Robert Morrow

The 1988 Hamilton municipal election was held on November 14, 1988 to elect a Regional Chairman, a Mayor, sixteen members to Hamilton, Ontario City Council, seventeen members to the Hamilton Board of Education and thirteen members to the Hamilton-Wentworth Roman Catholic Separate School Board.

== Regional chairman election ==
Summary of the November 14, 1988, Hamilton, Ontario regional chairman election
Candidate	Popular vote		
Candidate	Votes	%	±%
Reg Whynott	45,417	35.03%	n/a
Reg Wheeler	38,203	29.47%	n/a
Pat Valeriano	21,116	16.29%	n/a
Paul Cowell	21,116	12.70%	n/a
Ian Stout	21,116	6.52%	n/a
Total votes	129,655	100%	
Registered voters	n/a	n/a	n/a
Note: The 1988 election was the first in which voters elected the regional chairman. Note: All Hamilton municipal elections are officially non-partisan. Note: Candidate campaign colours are based on the prominent colour used in campaign items (signs, literature, etc.) and are used as a visual differentiation between candidates.
Sources: LeFaive, Doug. "New chairman tackles province," Hamilton Spectator, Tuesday, November 15, 1988, Metro, B1

== Mayoral election ==
The 1988 mayoral race was overshadowed by a number of events, namely aldermanic contests, the 1988 federal election and the first general election for the Hamilton-Wentworth regional chairman. The two-person race drew little attention from local media, with reporters and commentators noting that Church of the Universe minister Michael Baldasaro had little chance of defeating incumbent mayor Bob Morrow.

On election night, Morrow said that his return with over 90% of the vote was nearly an acclamation, while Baldasaro indicated that he would not stop contesting elections and advancing the use of marijuana.

Candidates for the November 14, 1988 Hamilton, Ontario mayoral election
Candidate	Popular vote		
Candidate	Votes	%	±%
Robert Morrow (incumbent)	74,969	90.87%	n/a
Michael Baldasaro	7,528	9.12%	n/a
Total votes	82,497	Note 1	
Registered voters	n/a	n/a	n/a
Note 1: Each ward elected two aldermen and percentages are specific to each candidate, not for the overall total. Note 2: All Hamilton municipal elections are officially non-partisan. Note 3: Candidate campaign colours are based on the prominent colour used in campaign items (signs, literature, etc.) and are used as a visual differentiation between candidates.
Sources: Christmas, Brian. "Morrow swept back in with over 90% of the vote," The Hamilton Spectator, November 15, 1988, Metro, B2.

== City council election ==
=== Ward One (West Hamilton-McMaster) ===
The 1988 election in Ward One saw tensions between homeowners and student residents come to the forefront of the campaign. In the summer of 1988, Hamilton, Ontario City Council passed a bylaw aimed at reducing the prominence of student houses in the area by limiting the number of unrelated tenants in a single family home to five. This decision angered the McMaster Students Union and prompted a concentrated effort on behalf of the undergraduate representative body to find a pro-student candidate to challenge incumbent aldermen Terry Cooke and Mary Kiss. Ultimately, the attempt was unsuccessful. MSU President Cyrus Barucha noted that "Our real hope was to find someone respected by both the community and the students...we had several people in mind, but none of them were willing to come forward."

While student housing in the area was a main issue, the incumbent candidates stood firmly on a platform of their track records. Cooke, a one-term alderman and, at the time, the youngest member of council, pushed for more affordable housing and improvements to the area's roads while fighting for fiscal responsibility. The Spectator noted that Cooke had attempted to secure over $250,000 in budget cuts in 1988. Cooke's campaign slogan in 1988 was Practical Progressive Representation.

Kiss maintained her track record of a champion for the people, while highlighting the importance of preserving both the unique neighbourhoods and environmental characteristics of Ward One. A two-term alderman at the time, Kiss faced considerable criticism from members of the community over her opposition to the construction of two three-storey apartment buildings on Broadway Avenue near McMaster University. A small group of residents disapproved of the proposal to change the site's zoning from light industrial to residential and stormed a meeting of city council where the issue was to be discussed. Kiss championed their cause, but was ultimately unsuccessful thanks to a ruling against their stand by the Ontario Municipal Board.

Challenger Neil Hughes was a local businessman and political activist, having worked on the campaigns of Lincoln Alexander and Victor Copps. Hughes was upset about a perceived attitude of favourability toward special interest groups by members of council and the handling of the student housing bylaw that he called "unenforceable". Hughes mentioned during the campaign that if he was unable to unseat either Kiss or Cooke, he would seek election once more in 1991, which he ultimately did not do.

On election night, Cooke and Kiss were returned to council by a comfortable margin over Hughes. Cooke joked with Spectator reporter Mike Hanley that, if early results showed he was losing, people should look for him at the high-level bridge. Kiss commented that, despite placing second to Cooke for a second time, she was merely humbled to be elected to a third term.

Summary of the November 14, 1988 Hamilton, Ontario Ward One alderman election
Candidate	Popular vote		
Candidate	Votes	%	±%
Terry Cooke (incumbent)	7,723	43.09%	n/a
Mary Kiss (incumbent)	6,567	36.64%	n/a
C. Neil Hughes	3,633	20.27%	n/a
Total votes	11,067	Note 1	
Registered voters	n/a	41.65%	n/a
Note 1: Each ward elected two aldermen and percentages are specific to each candidate, not for the overall total. Note 2: All Hamilton municipal elections are officially non-partisan. Note 3: Candidate campaign colours are based on the prominent colour used in campaign items (signs, literature, etc.) and are used as a visual differentiation between candidates.
Sources: Hanley, Mike. "No need for trip to the High Level Bridge", The Hamilton Spectator, November 15, 1988, Metro, B2.

=== Ward Two (Downtown) ===
Of the major issues facing Ward Two in the 1988 election, high-rise development, an aging population and the actions of the incumbent aldermen were at the forefront of the campaign. Traffic and parking issues were prominent as well, but more pressing were issues relating to the ward's long-time representatives.

Incumbent alderman Vince Agro had served in his capacity as one of Ward Two's two representatives at city hall since 1964, with only three years off from 1976 to 1979 after a failed mayoralty bid. The former teacher had come under fire for his campaign against the city's executive committee and was widely critiqued in the area for his support of a high-density senior's building near a popular local landmark, the Thistle Club. Agro also cited the completion of a park on the harbourfront and maintaining the Durand neighbourhood's character in the face of proposed high-rise developments. His main opposition came from residents of the city's Corktown and Stinson neighbourhoods, who were, "less than impressed with his efforts at ward healing." Agro was a prominent Hamilton-area Liberal, garnering the support of Culture and Communications Minister Lily Munro and CHCH-TV reporter Stan Keyes, who would represent Hamilton West in Parliament from 1988 until 2004.

Agro's seatmate, Bill McCulloch, sought his eleventh term on council, and was, at the time, the longest-serving alderman in the city. His decision to seek another term surprised many in the city, as he had indicated he would not be running in the 1988 election. This announcement placed him in the most objective position to review the pay of alderman, which was completed during his tenth term at city hall and recommended increasing the pay of municipal representatives by 24%. McCulloch was chairman of the city's Hamilton–Scourge Project, which sought to raise two schooners from the War of 1812 from Lake Ontario, which was a priority for the former naval officer.

William Laidlaw, a Canada Post worker, challenged Agro and McCulloch for a second time, running on a platform of open communication. Laidlaw noted that he was frustrated the city spent considerable amounts of money on improving the Gore Park area and then allowed 'peep shows' to open up around it. Laidlaw was supported in his bid by the local New Democratic Party, the Hamilton and District Labour Council and the Letter Carriers Union of Canada, Local 3.

Retiree Joe Gaul sought election, running on an anti-incumbency platform, challenging McCulloch's plan to raise the Hamilton and Scourge. Gaul was active with the Royal Canadian Legion Branch 163. Gaul ran with the slogan Go For Gaul! during the campaign.

Summary of the November 14, 1988 Hamilton, Ontario Ward Two alderman election
Candidate	Popular vote		
Candidate	Votes	%	±%
Vince Agro (incumbent)	4,372	49.78%	±0%
Bill McCulloch (incumbent)	4,229	48.16%	+0.9%
William Laidlaw	3,110	35.41	n/a
Joe Gaul	2,287	26.04	n/a
Total votes	8,782	Note 1	
Registered voters	28,848	30.44%	n/a
Note 1: Each ward elected two aldermen and percentages are specific to each candidate, not for the overall total. Note 2: All Hamilton municipal elections are officially non-partisan. Note 3: Candidate campaign colours are based on the prominent colour used in campaign items (signs, literature, etc.) and are used as a visual differentiation between candidates.
Sources: Morrison, Suzanne. "McCulloch, Agro team re-elected in Ward 2", The Hamilton Spectator, November 15, 1988, Metro, B2.

=== Ward Three (East Hamilton-Stipley) ===
Ward Three was a hotly contested race, with incumbent alderman Pat Valeriano seeking the office of Regional Chairman over another term as East Hamilton-Stipley's representative. A working-class ward, the area faced the problem of slum landlords failing to maintain neighbourhoods, heavy trucks posing safety problems and industrial-residential mixing that negatively impacted the health of residents.

Incumbent alderman Brian Hinkley had considered seeking the office of Regional Chairman, but after unsuccessfully standing as a New Democratic candidate against Liberal Lily Munro in Hamilton Centre during the 1987 Ontario Provincial Election, he found his resources drained and threw his energies into retaining his Ward Three seat. Hinkley, a long-time labour activist, focused his campaign on moving trucks from local roads to larger thoroughfares and improving access to the waterfront.

The highest profile contender for the open Ward Three seat was Don Drury, campaign manager and assistant to Liberal MP Sheila Copps. Drury was a candidate in 1985, finishing fourth, and ran on a similar platform in 1988, focusing on affordable housing and attracting clean industry to the city.

Marketing consultant Doreen Johnson was a community activist, serving on the Status of Women subcommittee at the city level and volunteering with the Immigrant Action Committee and the Hamilton and District Multicultural Centre. Tim Nolan also sought the seat, pushing for economic development and repairing sewers through the ward.

Summary of the November 14, 1988 Hamilton, Ontario Ward Three alderman election
Candidate	Popular vote		
Candidate	Votes	%	±%
Brian Hinkley (incumbent)	6,848	64.8%	n/a
Don Drury	4,673	44.22%	n/a
Doreen Johnson	2,779	26.3%	n/a
Tim Nolan	2,210	21%	n/a
Total votes	10,568	Note 1	
Registered voters	30,323	34.85%	n/a
Note 1: Each ward elected two aldermen and percentages are specific to each candidate, not for the overall total. Note 2: All Hamilton municipal elections are officially non-partisan. Note 3: Candidate campaign colours are based on the prominent colour used in campaign items (signs, literature, etc.) and are used as a visual differentiation between candidates.
Sources: Milton, Steve. "Drury vows he won't be meek voice", Hamilton Spectator November 15, 1988, Metro, B2.

=== Ward Four (East Hamilton-Barton) ===
Following the defeats of both incumbent alderman in Ward Four during the 1985 election, only one challenger entered the race against David Christopherson and Geraldine Copps. Road upgrades, improving sewers and the environmental impact of sewage treatment plants and the regional garbage incinerator were all cited as major concerns by the residents of the ward during the election.

Wife of former mayor Victor and the mother of MP Sheila, Copps had built a record on supporting local residents against business interests. Early in her first term, she fought against a proposal to have food waste from Pearson International Airport in Toronto incinerated in Hamilton and stood with workers at the Hamilton's water treatment plant in their fight to prevent PCBs from being stored at their facility. During the 1988 campaign, she fought for improvements to local traffic and lower taxes. Copps' campaign was adversely effected by the death of her husband during her first term, saying "It blew the wind out of our sails."

Christopherson earned a reputation as a diligent committee chairman and advocate for the ward's disadvantaged. He championed changes to the city's subsidized bus pass for seniors, but attempts to broker a similar deal for Hamilton's unemployed failed. After a vote of council approved a 24% pay increase for aldermen, Christopherson refused to accept his, saying he disagreed with the process.

The only challenger to Copps and Christopherson was right-leaning plumber Bob Fanjoy, who ran last in the 1985 election. Fanjoy ran on a campaign of increasing the number of retirement homes in the ward, as well as pushing to clean up pollution and improving transportation in the area.

Summary of the November 14, 1988 Hamilton, Ontario Ward Four alderman election
Candidate	Popular vote		
Candidate	Votes	%	±%
Geraldine Copps (incumbent)	8,174	69.38%	n/a
David Christopherson (incumbent)	8,055	68.38%	n/a
Bob Fanjoy	2,319	19.67%	n/a
Total votes	11,787	Note 1	
Registered voters	28,764	40.90%	n/a
Note 1: Each ward elected two aldermen and percentages are specific to each candidate, not for the overall total. Note 2: All Hamilton municipal elections are officially non-partisan. Note 3: Candidate campaign colours are based on the prominent colour used in campaign items (signs, literature, etc.) and are used as a visual differentiation between candidates.
Sources: Benedetti, Paul. "Clean campaign for a dirty job in Ward 4", The Hamilton Spectator, November 15, 1988, Metro, B2.

=== Ward Five (Red Hill-Rosedale) ===
Issues for the residents of Ward Five nearly all centered around traffic, as the ward was to play host to the controversial Red Hill Valley Expressway. The ward's political makeup was altered between the 1985 and 1988 elections, with incumbent alderman Shirley Collins stepping down in 1987 to successfully stand as Liberal candidate for MPP for Hamilton East. A 1987 by-election brought Catholic school board trustee Dominic Agostino to council, who had only 11 months of experience as alderman before contesting the 1988 election. The ward's second alderman, Reg Wheeler, announced he would not be seeking reelection to council, rather entering the race for regional chairman instead.

Agostino, for his part, ran on a platform of building more affordable housing, reducing local taxes and increasing voter connection to city hall. During his short tenure on council, Agostino angered some of his colleagues who criticized him of opportunism, after he created a bingo task force to examine how the industry operated in Hamilton, became the chairman of it and subsequently disbanded it.

After the Wheeler's announcement that he would be seeking higher office, former alderman Fred Lombardo, whom Wheeler defeated in 1985, announced his intention to contest his old seat. After a failed attempt in 1985 to become MPP for Hamilton East as a Progressive Conservative, Lombardo ran on a platform of improving transportation and increasing police presence in the area.

Shipping foreman Tom Rusich sought election for the third time in 1988, after contesting both the 1985 election and 1987 by-election in the ward. Rusich supported the Red Hill Valley Expressway and campaigned on better parks for local residents.

Elizabeth Savelli was an expressway opponent and campaigned on a platform of better planning and bringing down taxes though one-tier local government. Local actress Vera Raiser also contested the election, promoting a citywide anti-drug program and using abandoned local factories as uniform manufacturers for school children.

Summary of the November 14, 1988 Hamilton, Ontario Ward Five alderman election
Candidate	Popular vote		
Candidate	Votes	%	±%
Dominic Agostino (incumbent)	7,120	60.89%	n/a
Fred Lombardo	3,828	32.73%	n/a
Tom Rusich	3,505	29.97%	n/a
Elizabeth Savelli	3,165	27.07%	n/a
Vera Raiser	1,307	11.18%	n/a
Total votes	11,694	Note 1	
Registered voters	28,848	30.44%	n/a
Note 1: Each ward elected two aldermen and percentages are specific to each candidate, not for the overall total. Note 2: All Hamilton municipal elections are officially non-partisan. Note 3: Candidate campaign colours are based on the prominent colour used in campaign items (signs, literature, etc.) and are used as a visual differentiation between candidates.
Sources: McNeil, Mark. "Long night's vigil for Lombardo", The Hamilton Spectator, November 15, 1988, Metro, B2.

=== Ward Six (East Mountain) ===
Ward Six faced issues characteristic of the city's mountain wards in 1988, with older neighbourhoods close to the Escarpment requiring significant road repairs, senior citizens demanding more services and new families in suburban developments to the south expecting low taxes. Neglect of sidewalks, parks and other municipal services were major issues, with challengers proposing to fix the problems and keep taxes low to appease the ward's diverse communities. Three-term alderman Paul Cowell declined to seek election in Ward Six, opting to contest the regional chairman's position instead. A controversial figure, Cowell was forced to resign as chairman of a regional committee after allegations that he was promoting his own business interests surfaced in 1987. A Progressive Conservative who unsuccessfully sought his party's nomination to stand as MPP for Hamilton Mountain, Cowell was also threatened with a slander lawsuit in 1988 after making allegations about illegal dumping against a local waste management company.

Incumbent alderman John Smith, who served as Hamilton Mountain's Progressive Conservative MPP from 1967 until being defeated by New Democrat Brian Charlton in 1977, fought the 1988 race on improving water quality and improving council conduct.

Of the challengers, Tom Jackson ran the most aggressive campaign, noted in local media as appearing as if he was seeking federal or provincial office. A local businessman and McMaster graduate, Jackson ran third in the 1985 race. During the 1988 campaign, he called for the city to curb its spending habits, referred to the pay increase approved by alderman as 'disgusting' and was quoted as saying "I sense a yearning for a return to politicians who have honour, integrity, decency and accessibility."

Ken Stone, a local Canada Post employee and activist, worked with the Hamilton-Wentworth Social Planning and Research Council, the Hamilton and District Labour Council and the local New Democratic Party. Stone fought for more openness in government and improved services for the residents of the ward.

Two-time candidate and high school gym teacher Vince Formosi sought election once more in 1988, fought for Escarpment beautification, opening City Hall on Saturdays and proposed a south-Mountain superpark with a wave pool, golf course, hotel and shopping mall.

Peter O'Hagan was an opponent of the Red Hill Valley Expressway and ran on a conservative platform of reducing alderman's pay, dropping council's responsibilities to a part-time and cutting most civic spending. University of Waterloo urban planning student Allan McDiarmid ran a very low-key campaign, pushing for all-day GO Train service, a quick completion of the Red Hill Valley Expressway and one-tier local government.

Summary of the November 14, 1988 Hamilton, Ontario Ward Six alderman election
Candidate	Popular vote		
Candidate	Votes	%	±%
John Smith (incumbent)	7,448	53.72%	n/a
Tom Jackson	6,706	48.37%	n/a
Ken Stone	3,785	27.3%	n/a
Vince Formosi	3,311	23.88%	n/a
Peter O'Hagan	1,689	12.18%	n/a
Allan McDiarmid	482	3.48%	n/a
Total votes	13,864	Note 1	
Registered voters	27,676	50.09%	n/a
Note 1: Each ward elected two aldermen and percentages are specific to each candidate, not for the overall total. Note 2: All Hamilton municipal elections are officially non-partisan. Note 3: Candidate campaign colours are based on the prominent colour used in campaign items (signs, literature, etc.) and are used as a visual differentiation between candidates.
Sources: Holt, Jim. "Void left by Cowell filled by Jackson", The Hamilton Spectator, November 15, 1988, Metro, B2.

=== Ward Seven (Central Mountain) ===
Ward Seven faced a 20% population jump between the 1983 and the 1988 election, quickly cementing its status as the city's most populated ward. In addition to a major flood in the summer of 1988 following a heavy storm, the growing senior population necessitated the construction of more retirement homes.

Incumbent alderman Henry Merling was one of city hall's most controversial characters, gaining wide support among residents while earning the ire of his colleagues. Merling took on developers who were building new subdivisions to the south of the ward over issues residents had with their foundations and called for better sewage treatment facilities in the face of the flooding issues in the summer of 1988. Alternately, Merling was embroiled in controversy after he physically attacked his Ward Seven seat-mate, John Gallagher, choking him after a dispute at city hall. Later, he accused Ward One alderman Mary Kiss of promoting nepotism over what he viewed as unfair hiring processes.

Gallagher was a one-term incumbent at the time of the election and faced sharp criticism from local media over a number of controversial incidents. Early in his term, Gallagher demanded a management review of HSR commissioner Heinz Schweinbenz and attacked administrative officer Mac Carson over allegedly understating a report that critiqued aldermen for interfering in the operations of the city's bus service. Following those incidents, Gallagher was accused of attempting to remove the city's director of culture, Audell Schimmel. During the 1988 election, Gallager fought for the Red Hill Valley Expressway and promised to help improve sewage issues in the ward.

Among those challenging the incumbent aldermen were HSR operator Andy Asselin, who stood on a platform of improving the physical infrastructure of the ward and dealing with sewage issues. Asselin was endorsed by the local New Democratic Party, sporting their party colours on his campaign literature and signs. The party lent Asselin their support after he stood as their federal candidate in the 1979 election. At the time of the election, Asselin was the Treasurer of the Amalgamated Transit Union Local 107.

Stelco lab analyst Steve Cooper sought election a second time after placing fifth in the 1985 election. Cooper ran on a platform of zero-based budgeting, where the city would view expenditures on a program by program basis and ending secrecy at city hall.

Blair O'Halloran styled himself as a one-issue candidate, fighting back against the pay increase issued to aldermen. O'Halloran posted flyers across the ward shaming the sitting aldermen with the slogan "Don't Forget! Don't Elect!" Local Communist Bob Mann sought election in Ward 7, following bids for Ward 2 alderman in 1978, Ward 4 alderman in 1980 and federal office in 1984 as a representative of the Communist Party of Canada. Mann called for higher corporate taxes and an end to downloading of services to the municipality. Sheet-metal apprentice Stephen Jones called for the renovation of the abandoned Inverness School into a seniors centre and day care, the only issue noted as a campaign plank in local media.

Summary of the November 14, 1988 Hamilton, Ontario Ward Seven alderman election
Candidate	Popular vote		
Candidate	Votes	%	±%
Henry Merling (incumbent)	9,667	65.89%	n/a
John Gallagher (incumbent)	7,397	50.42%	n/a
Andy Asselin	3,557	24.24%	n/a
Steve Cooper	1,955	13.32%	n/a
Blair O'Halloran	924	6.3%	n/a
Bob Mann	771	5.3%	n/a
Steven Jones	630	4.3%	n/a
Total votes	14,670	Note 1	
Registered voters	31,783	46.16%	n/a
Note 1: Each ward elected two aldermen and percentages are specific to each candidate, not for the overall total. Note 2: All Hamilton municipal elections are officially non-partisan. Note 3: Candidate campaign colours are based on the prominent colour used in campaign items (signs, literature, etc.) and are used as a visual differentiation between candidates.
Sources: Dreschel, Andrew. "'The people' return the favour at ballot box", The Hamilton Spectator, November 15, 1988, Metro, B2.

=== Ward Eight (West Mountain) ===
Summary of the November 14, 1988 Hamilton, Ontario Ward Eight alderman election
Candidate	Popular vote		
Candidate	Votes	%	±%
Don Ross (incumbent)	6,541	46.61%	n/a
Tom Murray (incumbent)	6,320	45.04%	n/a
Lindsay Nelson	3,650	26.01%	n/a
Ed Herechuk	3,254	23.19%	n/a
Mike Oddi	2,569	18.30%	n/a
John Lewis	1,358	9.7%	n/a
Total votes	14,031	Note 1	
Registered voters	30,076	46.65%	n/a
Note 1: Each ward elected two aldermen and percentages are specific to each candidate, not for the overall total. Note 2: All Hamilton municipal elections are officially non-partisan. Note 3: Candidate campaign colours are based on the prominent colour used in campaign items (signs, literature, etc.) and are used as a visual differentiation between candidates.
Sources: MacPhail, Wayne. "Arena battle fails to hurt Murray", The Hamilton Spectator, November 15, 1988, Metro, B2.

== See also ==
- List of Hamilton, Ontario, municipal elections
