= Fanjoy =

Fanjoy is a surname. Notable people with the surname include:

- Bob Fanjoy, a candidate in the 1988 Hamilton, Ontario, municipal election
- Bruce Fanjoy, Canadian politician
- Harold Fanjoy (1939–2008), Canadian businessman and politician
- Trey Fanjoy, American music video director
