= Ward 8 (Hamilton, Ontario) =

Municipal ward in Canada

- Constituency for the Hamilton City Council
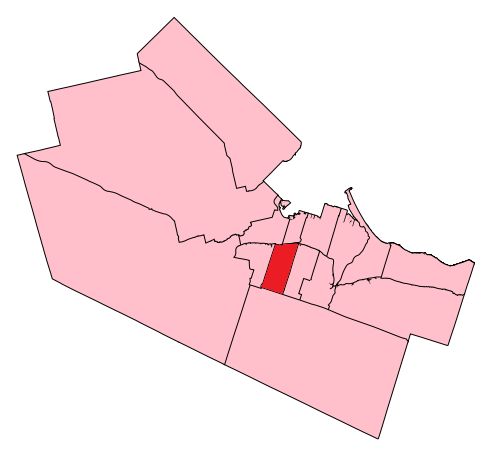
- Location of Ward 8 in Hamilton
- City: Hamilton
- Population: 36,130

Current constituency
- Councillor: Dawn Danko

Ward 8 is a municipal ward in Hamilton, Ontario, Canada, located on Hamilton Mountain. It elects one member to Hamilton City Council.

Ward 8 is bounded on the north by the Niagara Escarpment, on the west by Garth Street, on the south by a hydroelectric corridor, and on the east by Upper Wellington Street.

The ward includes the neighbourhoods of Allison, Balfour, Bonnington, Buchanan, Centremount, Greeningdon, Gourley, Jerome, Kennedy, Kerrighan, Mewburr, Mohawk, Rolston, Ryckmans, Sheldon, Southam, and Yeoville.

== History ==
Ward 8 has existed in the western part of Hamilton Mountain since the 1950 election. Prior to that, it was based in the city's east end.

=== Councillors ===
The ward was represented by two councillors until the city's amalgamation in 2000. Since then, it has been represented by one councillor.

Council	Member	
1951	Ed Crockett	Ken Crockett
1952	Ed Crockett	Ken Crockett
1953	Brian Morison	Ken Crockett
1954	Brian Morison	Ken Crockett
1955–56	Brian Morison	Ken Crockett
1957–58	Brian Morison	Ken Crockett
1959–60	Brian Morison	Ray Edwards
1961–62	Brian Morison	James MacDonald
1963–64	Jim Bethune	James MacDonald
1965–66	Jim Bethune	James MacDonald
1967–68	Jim Bethune	James MacDonald
1969–70	Jim Bethune	James MacDonald
1971–72	Ken Edge	James MacDonald
1973	Ken Edge	James MacDonald
1973–76	Ken Edge	James MacDonald
1977–78	Ken Edge	James MacDonald
1978–80	Ken Edge	James MacDonald
1980–82	Ken Edge	James MacDonald
1982–85	Tom Murray	Jim Bethune
1985–88	Tom Murray	Don Ross
1988–91	Tom Murray	Don Ross
1991–94	Frank D'Amico	Don Ross
1994–97	Frank D'Amico	Don Ross
1997–2000	Frank D'Amico	Duke O'Sullivan
2001–03	Frank D'Amico	
2003–06	Terry Whitehead	
2006–10	Terry Whitehead	
2010–14	Terry Whitehead	
2014–18	Terry Whitehead	
2018–22	John-Paul Danko	
2022–25	John-Paul Danko	
2025–26	Rob Cooper	
2026–30	Dawn Danko	

== Election results ==
=== 2026 ===
2026 Hamilton, Ontario municipal election: Ward 8 - West/Central Mountain
Candidate	Popular vote			Expenditures
Candidate	Votes	%	±%	Expenditures
Dawn Danko	3,945	43.64		
Terry Whitehead	2,173	24.04		
Jacob Tenbrinke	1,630	18.03		
Adlan Taramov	570	6.31		
Nenos Damerchie	326	3.61		
Pat Piro	198	2.19		
Jonathan Morris	197	2.19		
Total valid votes	9,039			
Total rejected, unmarked and declined votes				
Turnout				
Eligible voters				
Note: Candidate campaign colours are based on the prominent colour used in campaign items (signs, literature, etc.) and are used as a visual differentiation between candidates.
Sources: City of Hamilton, "Nominated Candidates"

=== 2025 by-election ===
A by-election was held in the ward on September 22, 2025, following the election of John-Paul Danko as Liberal Member of Parliament for Hamilton West—Ancaster—Dundas in the 2025 Canadian federal election.

The race saw a record number of candidates run at 26.

Candidates

- Lohifa Pogoson Acker: Business owner, hair artist and Hamilton Chamber board member.
- Ralph Agostino: Former Halton Catholic District School Board trustee; Realtor.
- Waleed Ali: Entrepreneur and real estate developer.
- Alex Ballagh: Coordinator at the National Overdose Response Service and co-chair of ACORN Hamilton.
- Caleb Bosveld: Business student at Redeemer University.
- Philip Bradshaw: Community advocate.
- Sonia Brown: Retirement home owner, and runner up in 2022 Ward 8 election.
- Rob Cooper: Hamilton Mountain Progressive Conservative Party riding association executive
- Joshua Czerniga: Educator and community advocate.
- Glen Davies: Retired systems analyst.
- Scott Duvall: Former city councillor for Ward 7 (2006–2015) and New Democratic Party MP for Hamilton Mountain (2015–2021).
- Andrew Fedurko: Mohawk College program coordinator.
- Anthony Frisina: Accessibility and inclusion advocate and student service representative at Mohawk College.
- Kevin Gonci: Retired army reservist, Ford Motor employee and CANUSA Games organizer.
- Read Hansen
- Asuf Khokhar: Hamilton police officer and Canadian Armed Forces veteran.
- Frank Lenarduzzi
- Michael T. Loomans
- Michael Marson
- Dale Murphy: Former General Electric employee.
- Marlon Picken: Equity activist
- Ray Polawski
- Sebastian Popovici
- Barry Quinn: Former Burlington and Halton Regional councillor, justice of the peace and president of the Ontario police services board.
- Terry Whitehead: Former Ward 8 city councillor (2013–2018)
- Colleen Wicken: Former staffer for Whitehead. Ran in Ward 7 in 2022.

==== Results ====
Candidate	Vote	%
Rob Cooper	1,129	19.35
Terry Whitehead	1,042	17.86
Barry Quinn	917	15.72
Lohifa Pogoson Acker	806	13.81
Asuf Khokhar	396	6.79
Sonia Brown	334	5.72
Scott Duvall	322	5.52
Caleb Bosveld	215	3.68
Alex D. Ballagh	115	1.97
Colleen Wicken	104	1.78
Anthony Frisina	69	1.18
Kevin Gonci	63	1.08
Philip Bradshaw	51	0.87
Marlon Picken	46	0.79
Ralph Agostino	36	0.62
Joshua Czerniga	29	0.50
Andrew Fedurko	25	0.43
Frank Lenarduzzi	22	0.38
Michael Marson	22	0.38
Ray Polawski	19	0.33
Waleed Ali	18	0.31
Glenn Davies	17	0.29
Dale Murphy	15	0.26
Sebastian Popovici	15	0.26
Read Hansen	4	0.07
Michael T. Loomans	4	0.07

=== 2022 ===
Ward 8's incumbent councillor, John-Paul Danko, was first elected in 2018, and told the Hamilton Mountain News he would seek re-election in 2022. Danko registered for re-election on 26 May.

On 16 May, Antony Frisina, a member of the city's Advisory Committee for Persons with Disabilities, filed to run for Ward 8 councillor. Frisina, a previous winner of the Order of Hamilton, told CBC Hamilton he is not unhappy with Danko's work, but wants to see the city do more for those living with disabilities.

Candidates for the 24 October 2022 Hamilton Ward 8 Councillor Election
Candidate	Popular vote			Expenditures
Candidate	Votes	%	±%	Expenditures
John-Paul Danko (Incumbent)	5,274	62.18	+20.51%	
Sonia Brown	1,936	22.82	-	
Anthony Frisina	634	7.47	-	
Joshua Czerniga	413	4.87	-	
Daniel Veltri	225	2.65	-	
Total votes	8,482			
Registered voters				
Note: All Hamilton Municipal Elections are officially non-partisan. Note: Candidate campaign colours are based on the prominent colour used in campaign items (signs, literature, etc.) and are used as a visual differentiation between candidates.
Sources: City of Hamilton, "Nominated Candidates"

=== 2018 ===
Christopher Climie, a local real estate agent, was the first candidate to register on May 8, 2018. Despite Climie's early entry into the race, he made no effort to campaign, not responding to any questions from local media, maintaining any campaign website or infrastructure, or appearing at any debates.

John-Paul Danko, runner up in the 2016 Ward 7 by-election, registered to run in Ward 8 on May 11, 2018. Danko, the husband of Ward 7 Public School Trustee Dawn Danko, began to publicly campaign for an appointment to city council after the winner of the 2016 by-election, Donna Skelly, was elected Progressive Conservative MPP for Flamborough—Glanbrook.

Colleen Wicken registered to seek the seat on June 28, 2018. Wicken, a staffer with Ward 8 Councillor Terry Whitehead and former chair of the Bonnington-Buchanan-Mohawk-Southam Neighbourhoods Association, had previously advocated for more police presence in student neighbourhoods and against the city's ward boundary changes. Danko ran on a platform of supporting the city's LRT project, reducing speeds on local streets, investing in infrastructure, and planning for intensification along Upper James Street.

On the final day of registrations, former Mississauga City Councillor and MP for Mississauga-Brampton South, Eve Adams, registered to seek the Ward 8 seat. Adams, who was elected as a Conservative in 2011 and crossed the floor to the Liberals prior to the 2015 election before losing a nomination battle to Marco Mendicino in the Toronto-area riding of Eglinton-Lawrence, had served on Mississauga City Council representing Ward 5 from 2003 to her election to Parliament in 2011. Adams, who has family in Hamilton, noted that she wanted to widen the Red Hill Valley Expressway and the 403, cancel the city's LRT project, and attract more businesses to Hamilton.

During the campaign, Ward 8 councillor Terry Whitehead, who was seeking election in Ward 14, mass-emailed constituents, accusing Wicken of stealing a contact list meant for Christmas cards for personal political gain and encouraging residents to report Wicken to the police. Wicken denied the accusation. Whitehead, who had endorsed Ruddick, requested the Hamilton Police open an investigation into the matter.

Candidates for the October 22, 2018 Hamilton, Ontario Ward 8 Councillor Election
Candidate	Popular vote			Expenditures
Candidate	Votes	%	±%	Expenditures
John-Paul Danko	3,752	41.67%	+23% Note 1	$25,906.54
Eve Adams	2,097	23.29%	-	$19,800.00
Steve Ruddick	1,905	21.16%	-	$7,988.23
Colleen Wicken	911	10.12%	-	$9,872.08
Anthony Simpson	288	3.20%	-	-^{1}
Christopher Climie	50	0.56%	-	-^{1}
Total votes	9,003			
Registered voters	21,694	41.5%	+5.21%	
^{1} These candidates did not submit official Financial Statements and are, therefore, ineligible to run in the 2022 election Note 1: Results compared to 2016 By-Election; Note: All Hamilton Municipal Elections are officially non-partisan. Note: Candidate campaign colours are based on the prominent colour used in campaign items (signs, literature, etc.) and are used as a visual differentiation between candidates.
Sources: City of Hamilton, "Nominated Candidates"

=== 2014 ===

The first candidate to register in the West Mountain race was Jimmy Dean, who filed his nomination papers on March 21. Speaking with the Mountain News, Dean indicated that he opposed the city's proposed LRT, wanted to see better road maintenance, and expressed a desire to examine community snow-removal for seniors.

Candidates for the October 27, 2014 Hamilton, Ontario Ward Eight Councillor Election
Candidate	Popular vote			Expenditures
Candidate	Votes	%	±%	Expenditures
Terry Whitehead (incumbent)	9,364	76.54%	+9.17%	$29,517.87
Joshua Peter Czerniga	2,870	23.46%	–	n/a^{1}
Total votes	12,554	36.29%		
Registered voters				
^{1} These candidates did not submit official Financial Statements and are, therefore, ineligible to run in the 2018 Municipal election Note: All Hamilton Municipal Elections are officially non-partisan. Note: Candidate campaign colours are based on the prominent colour used in campaign items (signs, literature, etc.) and are used as a visual differentiation between candidates.
Sources: City of Hamilton, "Nominated Candidates" Archived 2010-08-20 at the Wayback Machine

=== 2010 ===
Ward Eight's council race was marked by the unofficial withdrawal of two candidates, namely Jeff Bonner for personal reasons and Bruce Whitelaw in support of incumbent Councillor Terry Whitehead's campaign.

Whitehead's last campaigning opponent, Kim Jenkinson, wrote a post-election reflection for The Hamilton Spectator, where she outlined her reasons for running and the process by which she campaigned. In the article, she noted, "I've had my say, I've played fair, and I have met some interesting people, and had my family and friends at my back the whole way."

Summary of the October 25, 2010 Hamilton, Ontario Ward Eight Councillor Election
Candidate	Popular vote		
Candidate	Votes	%	±%
Terry Whitehead (incumbent)	9,908	67.37%	+11.65%
Kim Jenkinson	3,877	26.36%	n/a
Bruce Whitelaw	471	3.20%	n/a
Jeff Bonner	451	3.07%	n/a
Total votes	15,135	100%	
Registered voters	34,259	44.2%	+1.19%
Note: All Hamilton Municipal Elections are officially non-partisan. Note: Candidate campaign colours are based on the prominent colour used in campaign items (signs, literature, etc.) and are used as a visual differentiation between candidates.
Sources: Hamilton, Ontario, City Clerk's Office Archived 2010-08-20 at the Wayback Machine, Hamilton Election Results

- Realtor and Mohawk College alumnus Jeff Bonner filed to run for council on July 8. On Sept. 23, Bonner announced he would be ceasing all campaign activities thanks to issues of a "personal nature".
- Kim Jenkinson, BA, CGA is currently the controller for a children's charity. Jenkinson ran what she called a 'back to basics' campaign, highlighting a platform of accountability and action.
- Incumbent Councillor Terry Whitehead filed for re-election on July 21, 2010.
- A pipe fitter on disability, Bruce Whitelaw focused on senior care, saying that it was an issue that, "lit my fire.... We're not maintaining their dignity." On October 15, 2010, Whitelaw announced that would step down from the campaign and throw his support behind incumbent Terry Whitehead.

=== 2006 ===
Summary of the November 13, 2006 Hamilton, Ontario Ward Eight Councillor Election
Candidate	Popular vote		
Candidate	Votes	%	±%
Terry Whitehead (Incumbent)	7,829	55.72	+28.59%
Frank D'Amico	3,614	25.72	-
Peter Martin	2,387	16.99	+2.03%
Wayne Boychuk	221	1.57	+0.52%
Total votes	14,190	100%	
Registered voters	32,996	43.01%	
Note: All Hamilton Municipal Elections are officially non-partisan. Note: Candidate campaign colours are based on the prominent colour used in campaign items (signs, literature, etc.) and are used as a visual differentiation between candidates.
Sources: Hamilton, Ontario, City Clerk's Office

=== 2003 ===
Candidates for the November 10, 2003 Hamilton, Ontario Ward 8 Councillor Election
Candidate	Popular vote		
Candidate	Votes	%	±%
Terry Whitehead	4,135	27.13%	-
Jamie West	3,816	24.62%	-
George Morasse	3,081	20.22%	+5.41%
Peter Martin	2,280	14.96%	-
Naseem Jamil	978	6.42%	-
Roman Sarachman	789	5.18%	-
Wayne Boychuk	160	1.05%	-0.45%
Total votes	15,501	100%	
Registered voters	34,607	44.79%	
Note: All Hamilton Municipal Elections are officially non-partisan. Note: Candidate campaign colours are based on the prominent colour used in campaign items (signs, literature, etc.) and are used as a visual differentiation between candidates.

=== 2000 ===
Candidates for the November 13, 2000 Hamilton, Ontario Ward 8 Councillor Election
Candidate	Popular vote		
Candidate	Votes	%	±%
Frank D'Amico (Incumbent)	6,826	41.27%	
Duke O'Sullivan (Incumbent)	5,161	31.2%	-
George Morasse	2,750	14.81%	-
Mike Oddi	1,555	9.45%	-
Wayne Boychuk	248	1.5%	-
Total votes	16,540	100%	
Registered voters			
Note: All Hamilton Municipal Elections are officially non-partisan. Note: Candidate campaign colours are based on the prominent colour used in campaign items (signs, literature, etc.) and are used as a visual differentiation between candidates.

=== 1997 ===
Candidates for the November 10, 1997 Hamilton, Ontario Ward 8 Councillor Election
Candidate	Popular vote		
Candidate	Votes	%	±%
Frank D'Amico (incumbent)	8,400		-
Duke O'Sullivan	6,155		-
Tom Murray	3,463		-
Mike Oddi	2,230		-
Judith Preston	1,904		-
Tony Di Prospero	749		-
Chris Kiriakopoulos	696		-
Vish Bagal	632		-
Total votes			
Registered voters			
Note: All Hamilton Municipal Elections are officially non-partisan. Note: Candidate campaign colours are based on the prominent colour used in campaign items (signs, literature, etc.) and are used as a visual differentiation between candidates.

=== 1994 ===
Summary of the November 14, 1994 Hamilton, Ontario Ward Eight Alderman Election
Candidate	Popular vote		
Candidate	Votes	%	±%
Don Ross (incumbent)	7,171	50.4%	-5.27%
Frank D'Amico (incumbent)	5,890	41.4%	+1.8%
Tom Murray	4,422	31.07%	-0.8%
Ron Bowman	2,641	18.6%	n/a
Mike Oddi	1,813	12.7%	-3.44%
Janice Tomkins	1,269	8.9%	n/a
Chris Kiriakopoulos	803	5.6%	n/a
Total votes	14,233	Note 1	
Registered voters	31,279	45.5%	+-%
Note 1: Each ward elected two aldermen and percentages are specific to each candidate, not for the overall total. Note 2: All Hamilton Municipal Elections are officially non-partisan. Note 3: Candidate campaign colours are based on the prominent colour used in campaign items (signs, literature, etc.) and are used as a visual differentiation between candidates.
Sources: Oosthoek, Sharon. "Ward 8 voters wield a big stick: There'll be one new alderman for sure, so candidates have to pay attention", The Hamilton Spectator, November; 7, 1997, Local News, A6.

=== 1991 ===
Summary of the November 12, 1991 Hamilton, Ontario Ward Eight Alderman Election
Candidate	Popular vote		
Candidate	Votes	%	±%
Don Ross (incumbent)	8,407	55.67%	+9.06%
Frank D'Amico	6,524	43.20%	n/a
Tom Murray (incumbent)	4,813	31.87%	-13.17%
Mike Oddi	2,438	16.14%	-2.16%
John Ross	2,128	14.09%	n/a
John Lewis	546	3.62%	-6.08%
Total votes	15,102	Note 1	
Registered voters	n/a	n/a	n/a
Note 1: Each ward elected two aldermen and percentages are specific to each candidate, not for the overall total. Note 2: All Hamilton Municipal Elections are officially non-partisan. Note 3: Candidate campaign colours are based on the prominent colour used in campaign items (signs, literature, etc.) and are used as a visual differentiation between candidates.
Sources: Benedetti, Paul. "'Political bully' gets a sound thrashing", The Hamilton Spectator, November 13, 1991, Metro, B2.

=== 1988 ===
Summary of the November 14, 1988 Hamilton, Ontario Ward Eight Alderman Election
Candidate	Popular vote		
Candidate	Votes	%	±%
Don Ross (incumbent)	6,541	46.61%	n/a
Tom Murray (incumbent)	6,320	45.04%	n/a
Lindsay Nelson	3,650	26.01%	n/a
Ed Herechuk	3,254	23.19%	n/a
Mike Oddi	2,569	18.30%	n/a
John Lewis	1,358	9.7%	n/a
Total votes	14,031	Note 1	
Registered voters	30,076	46.65%	n/a
Note 1: Each ward elected two aldermen and percentages are specific to each candidate, not for the overall total. Note 2: All Hamilton Municipal Elections are officially non-partisan. Note 3: Candidate campaign colours are based on the prominent colour used in campaign items (signs, literature, etc.) and are used as a visual differentiation between candidates.
Sources: MacPhail, Wayne. "Arena battle fails to hurt Murray", The Hamilton Spectator, November 15, 1988, Metro, B2.

=== 1985 ===
Summary of the November 12, 1985 Hamilton, Ontario Ward Eight Alderman Election
Candidate	Popular vote		Elected?
Candidate	Votes	%	Elected?
Tom Murray(incumbent)	4,883	41.12%	
Don Ross	4,419	37.21%	
Jim Bethune (incumbent)	4,291	36.14%	
Vince Curtis	2,696	22.7%	
Bruce Aikman	2,536	21.36%	
Lorna Kippen	1,892	15.93%	
Total votes	11,875	41.88%	
Registered voters	28,354		
Note 1: Each ward elected two aldermen and percentages are specific to each candidate, not for the overall total. Note 2: All Hamilton Municipal Elections are officially non-partisan. Note 3: Candidate campaign colours are based on the prominent colour used in campaign items (signs, literature, etc.) and are used as a visual differentiation between candidates.
Sources: Dreschel, Andrew. "Newcomer Don Ross upsets veteran Jim Bethune", Hamilton Spectator, November 13, 1985, A7.

=== 1982 ===
Council Candidate	Vote	%
Jim Bethune	7,027	23.74
Tom Murray	6,686	22.58
Ken Edge	6,457	21.81
Tom Radigan	4,473	15.11
Kent Hines	3,276	11.07
Albert Arnold	912	3.08
Hans Jensen	773	2.61

=== 1980 ===
Council Candidate	Vote	%
Ken Edge	6,462	30.71
James MacDonald	5,112	24.29
Tom Murray	4,010	19.05
Walt Galdenzi	2,192	10.42
Albert Arnold	1,634	7.76
Joe McRoberts	948	4.50
Robert Hickey	687	3.26

=== 1978 ===
Council Candidate	Vote	%
Ken Edge	7,498	34.38
James MacDonald	6,181	28.34
Kent James Hines	3,556	16.31
Johnny Barron	2,466	11.31
John Wordock	1,067	4.89
Sam Hammonds	1,039	4.76

=== 1976 ===
Council Candidate	Vote	%
Ken Edge	7,781	31.47
James MacDonald	6,584	26.63
Allan Calvert	5,448	22.03
Kent Hines	2,887	11.68
Johnny Barron	1,158	4.68
Sam Hammond	870	3.52

=== 1973 ===
Council Candidate	Vote	%
Ken Edge	5,424	35.16
James MacDonald	5,258	34.08
Richard Leppert	1,799	11.66
Doug Francis	1,531	9.92
Sam Hammond	850	5.51
Michael Godwin	565	3.66

=== 1972 ===
Council Candidate	Vote	%
James MacDonald	5,218	43.57
Ken Edge	4,943	41.27
Michael Godwin	1,815	15.16

=== 1970 ===
Council Candidate	Vote	%
James MacDonald	6,329	35.41
Ken Edge	5,783	32.25
Bernard Long	3,309	18.51
Richard Leppert	2,453	13.72

=== 1968 ===
Council Candidate	Vote	%
Jim Bethune	7,263	32.42
James MacDonald	5,874	26.22
Ken Edge	3,288	14.68
Michael Paul Ginglo	2,448	10.93
John Edward Cooper	2,240	10.00
Audrey Margaret Johnstone	1,289	5.75

=== 1966 ===
Council Candidate	Vote	%
Jim Bethune	9,326	38.58
James MacDonald	6,100	25.24
John E. Cooper	3,020	12.49
Larry Alford	2,748	11.37
Audrey Johnstone	1,882	7.79
William MacDonald	1,096	4.53

=== 1964 ===
Council Candidate	Vote	%
Jim Bethune	4,190	36.51
James MacDonald	3,938	29.29
Gerry Griffin	2,634	19.59
John Voortman	1,965	14.61

=== 1962 ===
Council Candidate	Vote	%
Jim Bethune	6,274	30.55
James MacDonald	6,153	29.96
Arthur Child	4,873	23.73
Gordon Brown	3,237	15.76

=== 1960 ===
Council Candidate	Vote	%
Brian Morison	4,161	23.67
James MacDonald	3,769	21.44
Art Child	3,692	21.00
Gordon Brown	2,589	14.73
John Charlton	1,937	11.02
Charles Clarke	1,431	8.14

=== 1958 ===
Council Candidate	Vote	%
Brian Morison	4,742	24.22
Ray Edwards	4,645	23.73
Ken Crockett	3,296	16.84
Nellie Howell	1,948	9.95
Jack Luckman	1,589	8.12
Mel Coleman	1,321	6.75
Maurice Best	882	4.51
Robert Barnard	670	3.42
Thomas Barnard	331	1.69
George Harrett	152	0.78

=== 1956 ===
Council Candidate	Vote	%
Brian Morison	6,208	33.97
Ken Crockett	5,970	32.67
John W. Luckman	2,755	15.08
John C. McCullough	2,182	11.94
John W. Paton	1,158	6.34

=== 1954 ===
Council Candidate	Vote	%
Brian Morison	4,184	30.54
Ken Crockett	3,627	26.47
Ed Crockett	2,160	15.76
John Luckman	1,878	13.71
Grant Phinney	1,853	13.52

=== 1953 ===
Council Candidate	Vote	%
Brian Morison	3,750	30.54
Ken Crockett	2,763	22.50
Ed Crockett	2,020	16.45
Melville H. Coleman	1,741	14.18
John William Luckman	1,080	8.79
Grant Wellesley Phinney	926	7.54

=== 1952 ===
Council Candidate	Vote	%
Brian Morison	3,429	29.04
Ken Crockett	2,887	24.45
Melville H. Coleman	2,867	24.28
Ed Crockett	2,626	22.24

=== 1951 ===
Council Candidate	Vote	%
Ken Crockett	2,982	28.80
Ed Crockett	2,588	24.99
Charles D. Clarke	1,416	13.67
Brian Morison	1,207	11.66
William Neff (CCF)	890	8.59
Eileen Stuebing	745	7.19
Ozzie DeGrow	527	5.09

=== 1950 ===
Council Candidate	Vote	%
Ken Crockett	3,470	33.55
Ed Crockett	2,005	19.39
C. L. Harrington	1,123	10.86
W. G. Neff (Lab.)	1,051	10.16
Eileen A. Stuebing	1,045	10.10
Julia Dilks	701	6.78
W. H. Cartwright	453	4.38
Donald Stewart	366	3.54
John Pryke	129	1.25
