= 1994 Hamilton, Ontario, municipal election =

Canadian municipal election

Hamilton Municipal Election, 1994
- November 14, 1994
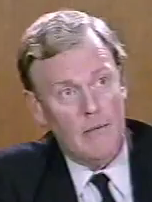

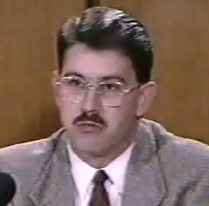
| Candidate | Bob Morrow | Paul Decker |
| Popular vote | 69,638 | 3,599 |
| Percentage | 87.3% | 4.5% |
Mayor before election
Bob Morrow
Elected mayor
Bob Morrow

The 1994 Hamilton municipal election was held on November 14, 1994, to elect municipal officials for the City of Hamilton. Hamiltonions selected one mayor, one regional chairman, and sixteen alderman to the Hamilton City Council (two from each ward), as well as members of both English and French public and Catholic school boards. Voters in the municipality also had the opportunity to cast a ballot for the regional chairman of the Hamilton-Wentworth region.

== Regional chairman election ==
=== Candidates ===
- Terry Cooke, 35, ran his campaign on the central issues that were raised by voters in time for the election, namely reforming government, improving policing, and redeveloping the downtown core.
- Bill Sears was formerly the mayor of Stoney Creek and served as the regional chairman prior to seeking the spot in a political comeback.
- Janice Wilson was a high-school teacher who ran a campaign that sought to curb hunting in the area and wanted to slow development to preserve the region's natural spaces.

=== Campaign ===
Following the retirement of Reg Whynott, three candidates entered the race to succeed him. Sitting Hamilton Alderman Terry Cooke faced off against former Stoney Creek mayor and regional chairman Bill Sears, and high school teacher Janice Wilson.

Summary of the November 14, 1994 Hamilton, Ontario regional chairman election
| Candidate | Popular vote | | |
| Candidate | Votes | % | ±% |
|---|---|---|---|
| Terry Cooke | 59,740 | 50.02% | n/a |
| Bill Sears | 48,143 | 40.18% | n/a |
| Janice Wilson | 11,559 | 9.8% | n/a |
| Total votes | 119,442 | 100% | |
| Registered voters | n/a | n/a | n/a |
Note: All Hamilton municipal elections are officially non-partisan. Note: Candidate campaign colours are based on the prominent colour used in campaign items (signs, literature, etc.) and are used as a visual differentiation between candidates.
Sources: Poling, Jim. "Policing, reform are top priorities, Cooke vows; 'There's a lot of work ahead,' jubilant victor tells supporters," Hamilton Spectator, November 15, 1994, News, A1.

== Mayoral election ==
=== Candidates ===
- Michael Baldasaro, 45, spent the early portions of the campaign in the Barton Street Jail, having been convicted of marijuana trafficking. During the 1991 campaign, he advocated reducing the number of councillors per ward to one, the establishment of a police services board and a civic referendum on the legalization of prostitution and marijuana use.
- Steve Bunn, 25, was an exterminator with a local pest control company at the time of the 1991 mayoral election. He openly admitted to being a fringe candidate, but claimed that he wanted to "present to the people of Hamilton a civic strategy touching on the various key aspects of municipal operations such as the economy, environment, commerce, tourism, etc," He campaigned on a platform of building a giant slide down Hamilton mountain, placing a tax on carp caught from Cootes Paradise and establishing a "Hamilton Hall of Fame Wax Museum".
- Paul Decker, 34, was a retail manager at a local Canadian Tire store, and presented a moderate alternative to Mayor Morrow. His platform included the creation of a six lane Red Hill Creek Expressway, increased police visibility and starting an aggressive marketing campaign promoting the city as a place of investment.
- Robert Morrow, 48, was the sitting mayor. Formerly a teacher, he had been elected to council in 1968, and won the mayoralty in 1982. His campaign focused on his experience in civic politics, redevelopment of the waterfront and reducing the size of Hamilton's city government.
- Allen Robert Skedden, 51, was the oldest candidate in the five-man race and had been on disability for a number of years thanks to his severe asthma. His platform included refusing the mayor's $85,000 salary and establishing a free breakfast and lunch program citywide. "When I was raised, a lot of us went to school hungry and that's a terrible feeling," he said in the early days of campaigning.
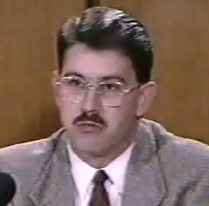
Retail manager Paul Decker

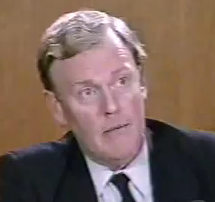
Sitting Mayor Robert Morrow

=== Results ===
A poll released by the Hamilton Spectator and CHCH News days before the vote showed that 69% percent of respondents supported Mayor Morrow, while Baldasaro, Decker and Bunn each received 1% support. 27% were undecided or refused to answer. Skedden received no support in the pre-election poll and, despite Mayor Morrow's high support rating, his approval rating sat at only 45%.

Summary of the November 14, 1994 Hamilton, Ontario mayoral election
| Candidate | Popular vote | | |
| Candidate | Votes | % | ±% |
|---|---|---|---|
| Robert Morrow | 69,638 | 87.3% | n/a |
| Paul Decker | 3,599 | 4.5% | n/a |
| Michael Baldasaro | 3,521 | 4.4% | n/a |
| Allen Robert Skedden | 1,569 | 1.9% | n/a |
| Steve Bunn | 1,518 | 1.9% | n/a |
| Total votes | 79,845 | 100% | |
| Registered voters | 233,000 | 34.27% | n/a |
Note: All Hamilton municipal elections are officially non-partisan. Note: Candidate campaign colours are based on the prominent colour used in campaign items (signs, literature, etc.) and are used as a visual differentiation between candidates.
Sources: Sumi, Craig. "Nice guys do finish first; Morrow back for fifth term after convincing victory", The Hamilton Spectator, November 15, 2010, Metro Section, B1.

== City council election ==
=== Ward One (West Hamilton-McMaster) ===
Incumbent Alderman Mary Kiss sought a fifth term, which would have made her the longest-serving female councillor in the city's history. Kiss made public safety her priority, seeking to put at least 60 new officers on the streets. She told the Spectator that, "Public safety and security is the No. 1 issue out there."

The ward's other incumbent alderman, Terry Cooke, gave up his seat to seek the office of regional chairman, sparking a race between seven other challengers to fill the vacancy.

Local businessman Marvin Caplan decided to run in the election to try to reverse some of the negative perceptions people had about municipal politicians and stayed away from making specific promises in the election. Where he did provide specifics was on the issue of McMaster University students, who make up a large portion of the renters in the area. He wanted to bring students and residents of the area together to pressure university administration to crack down on absentee landlords.

Cam Nolan took the step of drawing up position papers on different issues, placing fiscal prudence at the top of the list. He also put a priority on municipal reform, telling the Spectator, "I support a reduction in the number of aldermen because that shows leadership and responds to the needs of residents."

Charles Renaud, a local Liberal activist and candidate in the 1991 municipal election, ran to encourage more participation among citizens in municipal government.

Among the other candidates, Evelyn Myrie, a social activist, focused on policing. Myrie was a notable member of the community at the time, raising money for the local St. Joseph's Hospital by running the 1993 London Marathon and was the chairwoman of the city's Status of Women subcommittee. Ray Paquette wanted to encourage more business development in the city, Pat Ielasi advocated fiscal responsibility and slimming the size of local government, and social worker Emmy Weisz campaigned on long-term planning.

Summary of the November 14, 1994 Hamilton, Ontario Ward One alderman election
| Candidate | Popular vote | | |
| Candidate | Votes | % | ±% |
|---|---|---|---|
| Mary Kiss (incumbent) | 5,168 | 50% | -1.93% |
| Marvin Caplan | 3,706 | 35.84% | n/a |
| Cam Nolan | 2,500 | 24.18% | n/a |
| Charles (Chuck) Renaud | 2,892 | 21.35% | -2.19% |
| Evelyn Myrie | 1,406 | 13.6% | n/a |
| Ray Paquette | 1,070 | 10.35% | n/a |
| Pat Ielasi | 830 | 8.03% | -1.07% |
| Emmy Weisz | 379 | 3.67% | n/a |
| Total votes | 10,340 | Note 1 | |
| Registered voters | 25,473 | 40.59% | -1.59% |
Note 1: Each ward elected two aldermen, and percentages are specific to each candidate, not for the overall total. Note 2: All Hamilton municipal elections are officially non-partisan. Note 3: Candidate campaign colours are based on the prominent colour used in campaign items (signs, literature, etc.) and are used as a visual differentiation between candidates.
Sources: Herron, Shaun. "Only one new face elected to city council; Marvin Caplan is the new kid in town", The Hamilton Spectator, November 15, 1994, Metro, B1.

=== Ward Two (Downtown) ===
Sitting Alderman Vince Agro made an issue of parking in the downtown core following a parking ticket he received prior to the campaign's start at the corner of Augusta Street and James Street South. Agro told the Hamilton Spectator that "Free parking won't solve our downtown woes, but it's a small measure of help. Parking meters were originally installed as a way of turning that space over. We've lost sight of that." The issue of parking was tied into the overall theme of downtown revitalization that was a major issue during the campaign.

Summary of the November 14, 1994 Hamilton, Ontario Ward Two alderman election
| Candidate | Popular vote | | |
| Candidate | Votes | % | ±% |
|---|---|---|---|
| Vince Agro (incumbent) | 3,346 | 44.5% | ±0% |
| Bill McCulloch (incumbent) | 2,605 | 34.63% | +0.9% |
| Helaine Ortmann | 1,621 | 21.55% | n/a |
| Peter Hill | 1,465 | 19.48% | -9.68% |
| Joel Luke | 857 | 11.3% | n/a |
| Daniel Ribeiro | 669 | 8.9% | n/a |
| Jeffrey Peller | 518 | 6.9% | n/a |
| Robert Clark | 348 | 4.6% | n/a |
| Tim A. Yates | 172 | 2.3% | n/a |
| Total votes | 7,522 | Note 1 | |
| Registered voters | 26,598 | 28.8% | -1.08% |
Note 1: Each ward elected two aldermen, and percentages are specific to each candidate, not for the overall total. Note 2: All Hamilton municipal elections are officially non-partisan. Note 3: Candidate campaign colours are based on the prominent colour used in campaign items (signs, literature, etc.) and are used as a visual differentiation between candidates.
Sources: Herron, Shaun. "Only one new face elected to city council; Marvin Caplan is the new kid in town", The Hamilton Spectator, November 15, 1994, Metro, B1.

=== Ward Three (East Hamilton-Stipley) ===
Summary of the November 14, 1994 Hamilton, Ontario Ward Three alderman election
| Candidate | Popular vote | | |
| Candidate | Votes | % | ±% |
|---|---|---|---|
| Bernie Morelli (incumbent) | 4,849 | 60.63% | +24.83% |
| Don Drury (incumbent) | 4,673 | 58.63% | +6.63% |
| Ron Monahan | 792 | 9.94% | n/a |
| John Crawford | 758 | 9.51% | +2.11% |
| Ted Grizzly | 626 | 7.85% | n/a |
| Roger Lavoie | 269 | 3.38% | +0.48 |
| James Steven Faner | 159 | 2% | +0.78 |
| Total votes | 7,971 | Note 1 | |
| Registered voters | 28,994 | 27.5% | -5.85% |
Note 1: Each ward elected two aldermen, and percentages are specific to each candidate, not for the overall total. Note 2: All Hamilton municipal elections are officially non-partisan. Note 3: Candidate campaign colours are based on the prominent colour used in campaign items (signs, literature, etc.) and are used as a visual differentiation between candidates.
Sources: Longbottom, Ross. "Grizzly growls but results bear out winners' popularity", The Hamilton Spectator, November 15, 1994, Metro, B2.

=== Ward Four (East Hamilton-Barton) ===
Summary of the November 14, 1994 Hamilton, Ontario Ward Four alderman election
| Candidate | Popular vote | | |
| Candidate | Votes | % | ±% |
|---|---|---|---|
| Geraldine Copps (incumbent) | 5,535 | 65.5% | -0.61% |
| Dave Wilson (incumbent) | 4,272 | 50.5% | +0.44% |
| Murray Kilgour | 1,652 | 19.5% | +2.7% |
| Sheldon Taylor | 1,165 | 13.77% | n/a |
| Total votes | 8,456 | Note 1 | |
| Registered voters | 27,502 | 30.7% | -4.55% |
Note 1: Each ward elected two aldermen, and percentages are specific to each candidate, not for the overall total. Note 2: All Hamilton municipal elections are officially non-partisan. Note 3: Candidate campaign colours are based on the prominent colour used in campaign items (signs, literature, etc.) and are used as a visual differentiation between candidates.
Sources: Dehart, Nancy. "Ward 4: Hard to find signs of a vote", The Hamilton Spectator, November 7, 1997, Election Review, S10.

=== Ward Five (Red Hill-Rosedale) ===
In early October, Chad Collins, the son of one of the ward's former aldermen, announced he would seek his mother's former seat. Shirley Collins held the seat from 1982 until being elected to the provincial legislature in 1987. She served as the Liberal MPP for the riding of Wentworth East until being defeated in 1990. A 23-year-old student at the time, Collins made completing the Red Hill Creek Expressway, restructuring the municipal government and providing support for community-based policing his top priorities.

Summary of the November 14, 1994 Hamilton, Ontario Ward Five alderman election
| Candidate | Popular vote | | |
| Candidate | Votes | % | ±% |
|---|---|---|---|
| Dominic Agostino (incumbent) | 7,804 | 70.43% | +8.03% |
| Fred Eisenberger (incumbent) | 4,803 | 43.35% | +17.5% |
| Chad Collins | 3,661 | 33.04% | n/a |
| Total votes | 11,080 | Note 1 | |
| Registered voters | 28,265 | 39.2% | -3.67% |
Note 1: Each ward elected two aldermen, and percentages are specific to each candidate, not for the overall total. Note 2: All Hamilton municipal elections are officially non-partisan. Note 3: Candidate campaign colours are based on the prominent colour used in campaign items (signs, literature, etc.) and are used as a visual differentiation between candidates.
Sources: Wells, Jon. "Ward 5: A silence over the valley", The Hamilton Spectator, November 7, 1997, Election Review, S11.

=== Ward Six (East Mountain) ===
Summary of the November 14, 1994 Hamilton, Ontario Ward Six alderman election
| Candidate | Popular vote | | |
| Candidate | Votes | % | ±% |
|---|---|---|---|
| Tom Jackson (incumbent) | 7,956 | 65.1% | +6.55% |
| Bob Charters (incumbent) | 5,766 | 47.2% | +19.6% |
| John Smith | 4,130 | 33.8% | n/a |
| Charles Eleveld | 1,360 | 11.13% | +1.33% |
| Frederick Charles White | 396 | 3.2% | n/a |
| Edward Findlay | 342 | 2.8% | n/a |
| Total votes | 12,221 | Note 1 | |
| Registered voters | 29,110 | 41.9% | -4.55% |
Note 1: Each ward elected two aldermen, and percentages are specific to each candidate, not for the overall total. Note 2: All Hamilton municipal elections are officially non-partisan. Note 3: Candidate campaign colours are based on the prominent colour used in campaign items (signs, literature, etc.) and are used as a visual differentiation between candidates.
Sources: Wheeler, Carolynne. "Ward 6: Hot to finish expressway", The Hamilton Spectator, November; 7, 1997, Election Review, S11.

=== Ward Seven (Central Mountain) ===
Summary of the November 14, 1994 Hamilton, Ontario Ward Seven alderman election
| Candidate | Popular vote | | |
| Candidate | Votes | % | ±% |
|---|---|---|---|
| Henry Merling (incumbent) | 8,091 | 56.12% | +5.46% |
| Terry Anderson (incumbent) | 6,991 | 48.5% | +3.5% |
| John Gallagher | 3,019 | 20.94% | -4.44% |
| Carol O'Hagen | 1,896 | 13.15% | -5.39% |
| Warren Ellis | 1,701 | 11.8% | n/a |
| Alex Lolua | 978 | 6.8% | n/a |
| Mark Bulbrook | 969 | 6.7% | n/a |
| Mark Alan Whittle | 382 | 2.7% | n/a |
| Total votes | 14,418 | Note 1 | |
| Registered voters | 36,319 | 39.7% | +-% |
Note 1: Each ward elected two aldermen, and percentages are specific to each candidate, not for the overall total. Note 2: All Hamilton municipal elections are officially non-partisan. Note 3: Candidate campaign colours are based on the prominent colour used in campaign items (signs, literature, etc.) and are used as a visual differentiation between candidates.
Sources: Mentek, John. "Mixed concerns: Urban, rural issues go hand in hand for many Ward 7 voters", The Hamilton Spectator, November; 6, 1997, Local News, A6.

=== Ward Eight (West Mountain) ===
Summary of the November 14, 1994 Hamilton, Ontario Ward Eight alderman election
| Candidate | Popular vote | | |
| Candidate | Votes | % | ±% |
|---|---|---|---|
| Don Ross (incumbent) | 7,171 | 50.4% | -5.27% |
| Frank D'Amico (incumbent) | 5,890 | 41.4% | +1.8% |
| Tom Murray | 4,422 | 31.07% | -0.8% |
| Ron Bowman | 2,641 | 18.6% | n/a |
| Mike Oddi | 1,813 | 12.7% | -3.44% |
| Janice Tomkins | 1,269 | 8.9% | n/a |
| Chris Kiriakopoulos | 803 | 5.6% | n/a |
| Total votes | 14,233 | Note 1 | |
| Registered voters | 31,279 | 45.5% | +-% |
Note 1: Each ward elected two aldermen, and percentages are specific to each candidate, not for the overall total. Note 2: All Hamilton municipal elections are officially non-partisan. Note 3: Candidate campaign colours are based on the prominent colour used in campaign items (signs, literature, etc.) and are used as a visual differentiation between candidates.
Sources: Oosthoek, Sharon. "Ward 8 voters wield a big stick: There'll be one new alderman for sure, so candidates have to pay attention", The Hamilton Spectator, November; 7, 1997, Local News, A6.

== See also ==
- List of Hamilton, Ontario, municipal elections
