= John-Paul Danko =

Canadian politician

John-Paul Danko MP

Member of Parliament for Hamilton West—Ancaster—Dundas
- Incumbent
- Assumed office April 28, 2025
- Preceded by: Filomena Tassi

Hamilton City Councillor
- In office December 1, 2018 – April 28, 2025
- Preceded by: Terry Whitehead
- Succeeded by: Rob Cooper
- Constituency: Ward 8

Personal details
- Party: Liberal
- Spouse: Dawn Danko
- Website: johnpauldanko.ca

John-Paul Danko MP is a Canadian politician from the Liberal Party of Canada. He was elected Member of Parliament for Hamilton West—Ancaster—Dundas in the 2025 Canadian federal election. He also was a city council member in Hamilton, Ontario.

== Electoral record ==
=== Federal ===
2025 Canadian federal election: Hamilton West—Ancaster—Dundas
Party	Candidate	Votes	%	±%	Expenditures
Liberal	John-Paul Danko	38,970	56.10	+11.60	$102,866.37
Conservative	Erika Alexander	25,547	36.78	+7.71	$56,239.38
New Democratic	Roberto Henriquez	3,648	5.25	–14.46	$49,466.01
Green	Georgia Beauchemin	829	1.19	–1.42	$6,605.00
People's	Ava Sharavi	307	0.44	–3.66	$532.87
Christian Heritage	Jim Enos	163	0.23	N/A	$1,663.68
Total valid votes/expense limit		69,464	99.49	+0.09	$139,838.24
Total rejected ballots		356	0.51	–0.09	
Turnout		69,820	74.18	+2.98	
Eligible voters		94,124			
Liberal hold		Swing		+1.96	
Source: Elections Canada

=== Municipal ===
Candidates for the 24 October 2022 Hamilton Ward 8 Councillor Election
Candidate	Popular vote			Expenditures
Candidate	Votes	%	±%	Expenditures
John-Paul Danko (Incumbent)	5,274	62.18	+20.51%	
Sonia Brown	1,936	22.82	-	
Anthony Frisina	634	7.47	-	
Joshua Czerniga	413	4.87	-	
Daniel Veltri	225	2.65	-	
Total votes	8,482			
Registered voters				
Note: All Hamilton Municipal Elections are officially non-partisan. Note: Candidate campaign colours are based on the prominent colour used in campaign items (signs, literature, etc.) and are used as a visual differentiation between candidates.
Sources: City of Hamilton, "Nominated Candidates"

Candidates for the October 22, 2018 Hamilton, Ontario Ward 8 Councillor Election
Candidate	Popular vote			Expenditures
Candidate	Votes	%	±%	Expenditures
John-Paul Danko	3,752	41.67%	+23% Note 1	$25,906.54
Eve Adams	2,097	23.29%	-	$19,800.00
Steve Ruddick	1,905	21.16%	-	$7,988.23
Colleen Wicken	911	10.12%	-	$9,872.08
Anthony Simpson	288	3.20%	-	-^{1}
Christopher Climie	50	0.56%	-	-^{1}
Total votes	9,003			
Registered voters	21,694	41.5%	+5.21%	
^{1} These candidates did not submit official Financial Statements and are, therefore, ineligible to run in the 2022 election Note 1: Results compared to 2016 By-Election; Note: All Hamilton Municipal Elections are officially non-partisan. Note: Candidate campaign colours are based on the prominent colour used in campaign items (signs, literature, etc.) and are used as a visual differentiation between candidates.
Sources: City of Hamilton, "Nominated Candidates"

Candidates for the March 21, 2016 Hamilton, Ontario Ward Seven Councillor By-Election
Candidate	Popular vote			Expenditures
Candidate	Votes	%	±%	Expenditures
Donna Skelly	1,967	19.59%	-	$30,524.46
John-Paul Danko	1,875	18.67%	-	$21,530.03
Uzma Qureshi	1,521	15.14%	-	$28,621.86
Shaun Burt	881	8.77%	-	n/a^{1}
Doug Farraway	785	7.82%	-	$12,657
Geraldine McMullen	720	7.17%	-	$27,112.84
Tom Gordon	468	4.66%	-	$2,681.09
Howard Rabb	376	3.74%	-	$17,696.61
Bob Charters	354	3.52%	-	n/a^{1}
Glenn Murphy	255	2.54%	-	$5,840.09
Chelsey Heroux	172	1.71%	-	n/a^{1}
Hans Zuriel	133	1.32%	-	$8,531.42
Philip Bradshaw	110	1.10%	-	$1,450.12
Robert Bolton	95	0.95%	-	n/a^{1}
Jeanne Pacey	95	0.95%	-	n/a^{1}
Louis Vecchioni	64	0.64%	-	$0
Anthony Nicholl	62	0.62%	-	n/a^{1}
Mohammad Shahrouri	48	0.48%	-	$160
Robert Young	22	0.22%	-	$930.87
Paul Nagy	17	0.17%	-	$0
Damin Starr	17	0.17%	-	$7,886.76
Luc Hetu	6	0.06%	-	n/a^{1}
Total votes	10,063	24.35%	=7.4%	$40,005.55
Registered voters	41,332			
^{1} These candidates did not submit official Financial Statements and are, therefore, ineligible to run in the 2018 Municipal election Note: All Hamilton Municipal Elections are officially non-partisan. Note: Candidate campaign colours are based on the prominent colour used in campaign items (signs, literature, etc.) and are used as a visual differentiation between candidates.
Sources: City of Hamilton, "Nominated Candidates"; Archived 2010-08-20 at the Wayback Machine City of Hamilton, "2016 Candidate Financial Statements; Archived September 5, 2018, at the Wayback Machine
