= Filomena Tassi =

Canadian politician

The Honourable Filomena Tassi PC
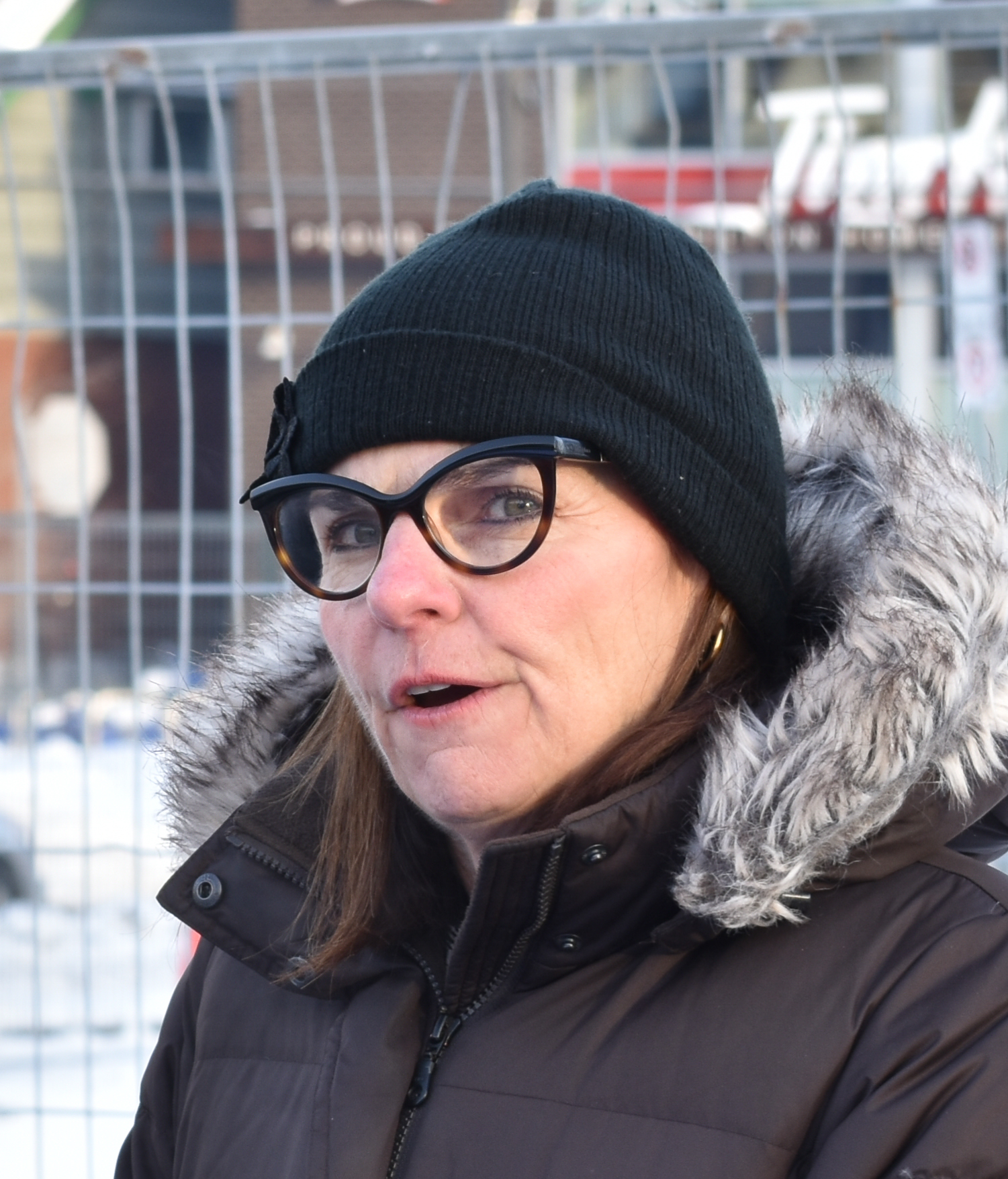
- Tassi in 2019

Minister responsible for the Federal Economic Development Agency for Southern Ontario
- In office August 31, 2022 – December 20, 2024
- Prime Minister: Justin Trudeau
- Preceded by: Helena Jaczek
- Succeeded by: Ruby Sahota

Minister of Public Services and Procurement Receiver General for Canada
- In office October 26, 2021 – August 31, 2022
- Prime Minister: Justin Trudeau
- Preceded by: Anita Anand
- Succeeded by: Helena Jaczek

Minister of Labour
- In office November 20, 2019 – October 26, 2021
- Prime Minister: Justin Trudeau
- Preceded by: Patty Hajdu
- Succeeded by: Seamus O'Regan

Minister of Seniors
- In office July 18, 2018 – November 20, 2019
- Prime Minister: Justin Trudeau
- Preceded by: Office re-established
- Succeeded by: Deb Schulte

Deputy Government Whip
- In office January 30, 2017 – August 31, 2018
- Prime Minister: Justin Trudeau
- Preceded by: Ginette Petitpas Taylor
- Succeeded by: Linda Lapointe

Member of Parliament for Hamilton West—Ancaster—Dundas
- In office October 19, 2015 – March 23, 2025
- Preceded by: David Sweet
- Succeeded by: John-Paul Danko

Personal details
- Born: 1962 (age 63–64) Hamilton, Ontario, Canada
- Party: Liberal
- Education: University of Waterloo; University of Western Ontario
- Profession: Attorney; chaplain

Filomena Tassi PC is a Canadian politician who served as the Minister responsible for the Federal Economic Development Agency for Southern Ontario from 2022 to 2024. A member of the Liberal Party, Tassi represented the riding of Hamilton West—Ancaster—Dundas in the House of Commons, taking office following the 2015 federal election. She served as the Minister of Public Services and Procurement and Receiver General for Canada from 2021 to 2022, as the Minister of Labour from 2019 to 2021, and as the Minister of Seniors from 2018 to 2019. She did not seek re-election in 2025.

== Education and early career ==
Tassi is of Italian descent, from the regions of Marche and Abruzzo, and was raised Catholic. She studied law at the University of Western Ontario, and then practised corporate law for six years. She subsequently left the legal profession and studied philosophy and religious education at the University of Waterloo, and began working as the chaplain at St. Mary Catholic Secondary School and Bishop Tonnos Catholic Secondary School, a job she held until her election to the House of Commons.

== Political career ==
Tassi's first run for elective office was as a candidate for the Ontario Liberal Party in the 1995 provincial election, where she finished a narrow second to NDP incumbent David Christopherson. Two decades later, she became the federal Liberal candidate in Hamilton during the 2015 federal election. Her candidacy attracted some media controversy, as she had made statements in the past suggesting that her Roman Catholic faith made her personally opposed to abortion, which seemingly put her in conflict with Liberal leader Justin Trudeau's requirement that all candidates agree to vote in favour of abortion rights. Trudeau clarified that Tassi had agreed to support the legal right to abortion.

Prior to entering federal politics, Tassi was a Catholic school board trustee.

After previously serving as Deputy Government Whip, Tassi was appointed to cabinet as Minister of Seniors on July 18, 2018, becoming the first minister responsible for the portfolio since 2015. After being re-elected in 2019, Tassi was named Minister of Labour, a job she held for just under two years until she was named Minister of Public Services and Procurement and Receiver General for Canada in the cabinet shuffle held following the 2021 federal election. Tassi served in that job until August 31, 2022, when she was named Minister responsible for the Federal Economic Development Agency for Southern Ontario, having requested to be moved to a portfolio with a lighter workload in order to deal with a family health matter.

Tassi did not seek re-election in the 2025 Canadian federal election. Liberal John-Paul Danko succeeded her as Member of Parliament for Hamilton West-Ancaster-Dundas.

== Electoral record ==
=== Federal ===
2021 Canadian federal election: Hamilton West—Ancaster—Dundas
Party	Candidate	Votes	%	±%	Expenditures
Liberal	Filomena Tassi	27,845	44.3	-2.3	$96,671.26
Conservative	Bert Laranjo	18,162	28.9	+2.2	$48,851.38
New Democratic	Roberto Henriquez	12,432	19.8	+2.0	$17,974.69
People's	Dean Woods	2,584	4.1	+2.7	$14,813.36
Green	Victoria Galea	1,661	2.6	-4.8	7,901.50
Rhinoceros	Spencer Rocchi	137	0.2	±0.0	$0.00
Total valid votes		62,821	99.4		
Total rejected ballots		387	0.6		
Turnout		63,208	71.2		
Eligible voters		88,781			
Liberal hold		Swing		-2.8	
Source: Elections Canada

2019 Canadian federal election: Hamilton West—Ancaster—Dundas
Party	Candidate	Votes	%	±%	Expenditures
Liberal	Filomena Tassi	30,214	46.55	-1.13	$77,474.77
Conservative	Bert Laranjo	17,340	26.72	-5.11	none listed
New Democratic	Yousaf Malik	11,527	17.76	+1.49	$35,360.66
Green	Victoria Galea	4,770	7.35	+3.12	none listed
People's	Daniel Ricottone	894	1.38	–	none listed
Rhinoceros	Spencer Rocchi	156	0.24	–	$0.00
Total valid votes/expense limit		64,901	99.36		
Total rejected ballots		415	0.64	+0.20	
Turnout		65,316	72.83	+0.29	
Eligible voters		89,679			
Liberal hold		Swing		+1.99	
Source: Elections Canada

2015 Canadian federal election: Hamilton West—Ancaster—Dundas
Party	Candidate	Votes	%	±%	Expenditures
Liberal	Filomena Tassi	29,694	47.68	+22.76	–
Conservative	Vincent Samuel	19,821	31.83	-10.57	–
New Democratic	Alex Johnstone	10,131	16.27	-11.92	–
Green	Peter Ormond	2,633	4.23	+0.5	–
Total valid votes/Expense limit		62,279	100.0		$221,675.78
Total rejected ballots		272	–	–	
Turnout		62,551	74.1%	–	
Eligible voters		84,350			
Liberal notional gain from Conservative		Swing		+16.66%	
Source: Elections Canada

=== Provincial ===
1995 Ontario general election: Hamilton Centre
Party	Candidate	Votes	%	±%	Expenditures
New Democratic	David Christopherson	8,012	36.81	-18.49	$40,543.33
Liberal	Filomena Tassi	7,322	33.64	+2.84	$34,483.85
Progressive Conservative	Angie Tomasic	5,723	26.29	+17.99	$18,222.88
Family Coalition	Tom Wigglesworth	376	1.72	+0.32	$1,548.28
Natural Law	Monique Poudrette	331	1.53	–	$0.00
Total valid votes		21,764	100.0		–
Total rejected ballots		372	1.68	-0.04	
Turnout		22,136	54.71	-5.07	
Eligible voters		40,459			
New Democratic hold		Swing		-10.66	

29th Canadian Ministry (2015–2025) – Cabinet of Justin Trudeau
Cabinet posts (4)
Predecessor	Office	Successor
Helena Jaczek	Minister responsible for the Federal Economic Development Agency for Southern Ontario; August 31, 2022 – present	Incumbent
Anita Anand	Minister of Public Services and Procurement; October 26, 2021 – August 31, 2022	Helena Jaczek
Patty Hajdu	Minister of Labour; November 20, 2019 – October 26, 2021	Seamus O'Regan
Alice Wong	Minister of Seniors; July 18, 2018 – November 20, 2019	Deb Schulte
