= Hamilton West—Ancaster—Dundas (federal electoral district) =

Federal electoral district in Ontario, Canada

Coordinates: 43.237°N 79.963°W

Ontario electoral district
- Interactive map of riding boundaries from the 2025 federal election

Federal electoral district
- Legislature: House of Commons
MP
John-Paul Danko
Liberal
- District created: 2013
- First contested: 2015
- Last contested: 2021
- District webpage: profile, map

Demographics
- Population (2011): 109,535
- Electors (2015): 82,929
- Area (km²): 110
- Pop. density (per km²): 995.8
- Census division: Hamilton
- Census subdivision: Hamilton (part)

Hamilton West—Ancaster—Dundas (French: Hamilton-Ouest—Ancaster—Dundas) is a federal electoral district in Ontario.

== History ==
Hamilton West—Ancaster—Dundas was created by the 2012 federal electoral boundaries redistribution and was legally defined in the 2013 representation order. It came into effect upon the call of the 42nd Canadian federal election, on October 19, 2015. It was created out of parts of Ancaster—Dundas—Flamborough—Westdale, Hamilton Centre and Hamilton Mountain.

Following the 2022 Canadian federal electoral redistribution, the riding will gain the Carpenter neighbourhood from Flamborough—Glanbrook, and will lose its territory in Strathcona (comprising the uninhabited section of Woodlands Cemetery) to Hamilton Centre.

== Demographics ==
According to the 2021 Canadian census

Languages: 71.1% English, 2.7% Arabic, 2.4% Mandarin, 2.3% Italian, 1.5% Spanish, 1.0% Portuguese, 1.0% Polish

Religions: 54.6% Christian (27.2% Catholic, 4.4% United Church, 4.1% Anglican, 2.5% Christian Orthodox, 2.1% Presbyterian, 1.6% Baptist, 1.0% Pentecostal, 11.7% Other), 7.3% Muslim, 1.9% Hindu, 1.5% Jewish, 1.0% Sikh, 32.4% None

Median income: $44,000 (2020)

Average income: $69,000 (2020)

Panethnic groups in Hamilton West—Ancaster—Dundas (2011−2021)
Panethnic group	2021		2016		2011	
Panethnic group	Pop.	%	Pop.	%	Pop.	%
European (Note: Statistic includes all persons that did not make up part of a visible minority or an indigenous identity.)	82,710	71.9%	85,575	77.98%	86,670	81.96%
South Asian	7,355	6.39%	5,205	4.74%	4,075	3.85%
East Asian (Note: Statistic includes total responses of "Chinese", "Korean", and "Japanese" under visible minority section on census.)	6,540	5.69%	5,630	5.13%	4,470	4.23%
Middle Eastern (Note: Statistic includes total responses of "West Asian" and "Arab" under visible minority section on census.)	5,805	5.05%	4,020	3.66%	3,120	2.95%
African	4,355	3.79%	3,485	3.18%	2,610	2.47%
Southeast Asian (Note: Statistic includes total responses of "Filipino" and "Southeast Asian" under visible minority section on census.)	2,865	2.49%	1,840	1.68%	1,650	1.56%
Latin American	2,035	1.77%	1,390	1.27%	1,140	1.08%
Indigenous	1,485	1.29%	1,475	1.34%	1,215	1.15%
Other/multiracial (Note: Statistic includes total responses of "Visible minority, n.i.e." and "Multiple visible minorities" under visible minority section on census.)	1,885	1.64%	1,120	1.02%	800	0.76%
Total responses	115,035	97.85%	109,740	97.09%	105,750	96.54%
Total population	117,565	100%	113,024	100%	109,535	100%
Notes: Totals greater than 100% due to multiple origin responses. Demographics based on 2012 Canadian federal electoral redistribution riding boundaries.

== Members of Parliament ==
This riding has elected the following members of Parliament:

Parliament	Years	Member	Party
Hamilton West—Ancaster—Dundas; Riding created from Ancaster—Dundas—Flamborough—Westdale, Hamilton Centre and Hamilton Mountain
42nd	2015–2019	Filomena Tassi	Liberal
43rd	2019–2021	Filomena Tassi	Liberal
44th	2021–2025	Filomena Tassi	Liberal
45th	2025–present	John-Paul Danko	Liberal

== Election results ==
View source data.
Graph of election results in Hamilton West—Ancaster—Dundas (minor parties that never got 2% of the vote or didn't run consistently are omitted)

2025 Canadian federal election
Party	Candidate	Votes	%	±%	Expenditures
Liberal	John-Paul Danko	38,970	56.10	+11.60	$102,866.37
Conservative	Erika Alexander	25,547	36.78	+7.71	$56,239.38
New Democratic	Roberto Henriquez	3,648	5.25	–14.46	$49,466.01
Green	Georgia Beauchemin	829	1.19	–1.42	$6,605.00
People's	Ava Sharavi	307	0.44	–3.66	$532.87
Christian Heritage	Jim Enos	163	0.23	N/A	$1,663.68
Total valid votes/expense limit		69,464	99.49	+0.09	$139,838.24
Total rejected ballots		356	0.51	–0.09	
Turnout		69,820	74.18	+2.98	
Eligible voters		94,124			
Liberal hold		Swing		+1.96	
Source: Elections Canada

2021 federal election redistributed results
Party	Vote	%
Liberal	28,561	44.30
Conservative	18,744	29.07
New Democratic	12,708	19.71
People's	2,645	4.10
Green	1,683	2.61
Others	137	0.21

2021 Canadian federal election
Party	Candidate	Votes	%	±%	Expenditures
Liberal	Filomena Tassi	27,845	44.3	-2.3	$96,671.26
Conservative	Bert Laranjo	18,162	28.9	+2.2	$48,851.38
New Democratic	Roberto Henriquez	12,432	19.8	+2.0	$17,974.69
People's	Dean Woods	2,584	4.1	+2.7	$14,813.36
Green	Victoria Galea	1,661	2.6	-4.8	7,901.50
Rhinoceros	Spencer Rocchi	137	0.2	±0.0	$0.00
Total valid votes		62,821	99.4		
Total rejected ballots		387	0.6		
Turnout		63,208	71.2		
Eligible voters		88,781			
Liberal hold		Swing		-2.8	
Source: Elections Canada

2019 Canadian federal election: Hamilton West—Ancaster—Dundas
Party	Candidate	Votes	%	±%	Expenditures
Liberal	Filomena Tassi	30,214	46.55	-1.13	$77,474.77
Conservative	Bert Laranjo	17,340	26.72	-5.11	none listed
New Democratic	Yousaf Malik	11,527	17.76	+1.49	$35,360.66
Green	Victoria Galea	4,770	7.35	+3.12	none listed
People's	Daniel Ricottone	894	1.38	–	none listed
Rhinoceros	Spencer Rocchi	156	0.24	–	$0.00
Total valid votes/expense limit		64,901	99.36		
Total rejected ballots		415	0.64	+0.20	
Turnout		65,316	72.83	+0.29	
Eligible voters		89,679			
Liberal hold		Swing		+1.99	
Source: Elections Canada

2015 Canadian federal election
Party	Candidate	Votes	%	±%	Expenditures
Liberal	Filomena Tassi	29,694	47.68	+22.76	$74,750.50
Conservative	Vincent Samuel	19,821	31.83	-10.57	$111,228.74
New Democratic	Alex Johnstone	10,131	16.27	-11.92	$50,321.97
Green	Peter Ormond	2,633	4.23	+0.50	$16,800.92
Total valid votes/Expense limit		62,279	99.57		$221,675.78
Total rejected ballots		272	0.43	–	
Turnout		62,551	72.55	–	
Eligible voters		86,222			
Liberal notional gain from Conservative		Swing		+16.67	
Source: Elections Canada

2011 federal election redistributed results
Party	Vote	%
Conservative	22,557	42.40
New Democratic	14,996	28.19
Liberal	13,257	24.92
Green	1,986	3.73
Others	409	0.77

== See also ==
- List of Canadian electoral districts
- Historical federal electoral districts of Canada
