= Hamilton–Scourge survey expedition =

Search for two shipwrecks in Lake Ontario

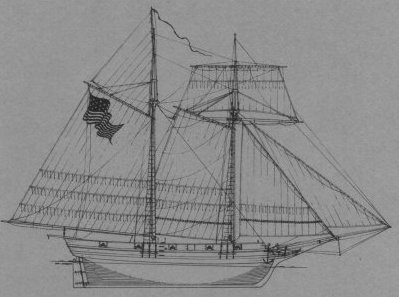
Sail plan of the USS Scourge

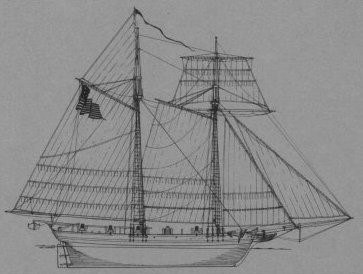
Sail plan of the USS Hamilton

The Hamilton–Scourge survey expedition was launched in May 1982, sponsored by the Hamilton-Scourge Foundation and the National Geographic Society. It was an underwater exploration of Lake Ontario intended to locate, confirm the identities of, film, and photograph two American schooners that had sunk in a violent storm on August 8, 1813, during the War of 1812. The mission was successful.

Searching for the two small ships 160 years later, even with their approximate location known, was like looking for a needle in a hay stack. The search had ended unsuccessfully in the autumn of 1973 when Hamilton resident Capt. Archie Hodge, turned his research vessel, Porte Dauphine, for home at Canada Centre for Inland Waters. Hodge, a Second World War naval veteran who had spent the war searching for submarines in the North Atlantic, decided to put down his sonar one last time.

A likely location for the USS Hamilton and the USS Scourge had been proposed in 1973 by Daniel A. Nelson, a dentist and amateur archeologist from St. Catharines, Ontario, Canada. Nelson's initial side-scan sonar assessment was confirmed using sonar recordings in July 1975 by Canadian Coast Guard research vessel R/V Limnos, based at the Canada Centre for Inland Waters.

The 1982 project, spearheaded by Nelson, used a remotely operated underwater vehicle that was designed, built and piloted by Chris Nicholson of Deep Sea Systems International. Nicholson was assisted by co-pilot Martin Bowen of the Woods Hole Oceanographic Institution.

The expedition provided clear photographs of the wrecks that confirmed their identities, collecting more than 1,500 photographs and 23 hours of video overall. These were the first pictures taken of the Scourge. The ships had sunk to the bottom, still upright, about 1,500 feet (460 m) apart and at a depth of around 300 feet (91 m) of icy water. The wrecks were well-preserved, with masts and topmasts intact and cannonballs still neatly stacked on the decks.

The 45-ton Scourge was armed with four 6-pounder and four 4-pounder deck guns, while the 76-ton Hamilton was armed with eight 18-pounder carronades and one 12-pounder long gun on a pivot mount. The ships' guns remain in position on deck.
