= 1985 Hamilton, Ontario, municipal election =

1985 Hamilton municipal election
- November 12, 1985
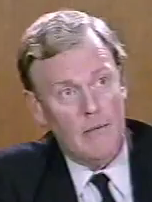
		JC
Candidate	Bob Morrow	Jim Campbell
Popular vote	51,305	31,956
Percentage	59.03%	36.77%
Mayor before election
Robert Morrow
Independent
Elected mayor
Robert Morrow
Independent

The 1985 Hamilton municipal election was held on November 12, 1985, to elect a mayor, sixteen members to the Hamilton, Ontario City Council, fourteen members to the Hamilton Board of Education and sixteen members to the Hamilton-Wentworth Roman Catholic Separate School Board. This election was accompanied by a referendum question asking voters if they wanted to directly elect individuals to the office of regional chairman.

== Campaign ==
The 1985 municipal election campaign came in the wake of the year's earlier provincial election that saw a Liberal minority government, supported by the Ontario NDP, come to power after the swift defeat of Frank Miller's Progressive Conservatives in a confidence motion in the weeks following the vote.

The change in government had impacted the city's local politics, as Premier Miller had vowed to extend GO Train commuter rail service to the city and supported the rapid transit GO-ALRT project. Following the election of the Liberals, both GO-ALRT and extended GO service to Hamilton were cancelled. Due to the fluctuating transit situation in the area, candidates ran on platforms that, in some way, addressed transit.

Prior to the 1985 vote, an advocacy group calling itself Concerned Citizens for Hamilton (CCH) formed to endorse candidates for office with a pro-business perspective. CCH solicited donations, eventually collecting approximated $25,000 to support candidates through third-party advertisements. The group's donations came under fire when the advertisements they printed in the Hamilton Spectator were investigated by the city as potentially contravening the Hamilton's election financing bylaw. Ultimately, CCH was cleared of any wrongdoing by the city. Though CCH solicited donations and campaigned on behalf of candidates, members denied they were a political party and lamented the fact they needed to organize. The organizers noted the 1985 vote was the most important in the city since the election of 1949 and one commented to the Hamilton Spectator that the organization was necessary to protect the city, adding "I hope we never have to do this again. This time was an exceptional circumstance."

== Referendum ==
Hamilton, Ontario, municipal election 1985 Regional Chairman referendum
Question	Yes		No	
Question	Votes	%	Votes	%
Are you in favour of direct-elections for the office of Hamilton-Wentworth Regional Chairman?	77,991	85.7	13,013	14.3
Total votes	91,005			
Registered voters	229,741			
Sources: Estok, David. "Voters want to elected regional leadership", Hamilton Spectator, Wednesday, November 13, 1985, A6.

== Mayoral election ==
The 1985 mayoral contest saw incumbent Mayor Bob Morrow, then 39, defend his three-year administration under the pressure of the lingering economic recession that had decimated the city's steel industry. By the election campaign, the city's unemployment rate had dropped to 5.8% and Morrow campaigned on his record of attracting new jobs to the region. Additionally, Morrow sought to expand GO Transit service to the city and bring more suburban services under the central administration of the municipality. Unlike during his first campaign, Morrow was endorsed by the Hamilton Spectator.

Morrow faced two challengers: former Board of Control member Jim Campbell and small business owner Marvin Sommer. Campbell, who retired from council in 1976, had sought political comebacks in 1980 and 1982, running for Ward 1 and Ward 7 councillor respectively. Campbell, then 64, was a millionaire who operated a concrete manufacturing plant on Hamilton mountain who campaigned on a small-business platform. Seeking a completion to the Red Hill Valley Expressway and a perimeter road to create a highway ring-road around Hamilton, Campbell proposed to tackle unemployment by creating a mayor's advisory panel consisting of local business and labour leaders. He additionally proposed reinstating the abolished Board of Control and reducing council's term of office to two years.

Sommer, a 49-year old James Street merchant at the time of the election, also ran on a pro-business platform, though promoted few specific policies. In an interview with a Spectator reporter, Sommer admitted he had not paid business taxes to the city in two years and his business was in danger of being shut down.

The campaign generated a moderate amount of interest among members of the electorate. At a CHCH-TV-sponsored call-in debate, only six local residents telephoned with questions for the candidates.

On election night, Morrow topped the polls, holding a lead of over 19,000 votes on Campbell.

Summary of the November 12, 1985 Hamilton, Ontario mayoral election
Candidate	Popular vote		
Candidate	Votes	%	±%
Robert Morrow (incumbent)	51,305	59.03%	+28.02
Jim Campbell	31,956	36.77%	n/a
Marvin Sommer	3,650	4.20%	n/a
Total votes	86,911	37.83%	
Registered voters	229,741	100%	
Note 1: All Hamilton municipal elections are officially non-partisan. Note 2: Candidate campaign colours are based on the prominent colour used in campaign items (signs, literature, etc.) and are used as a visual differentiation between candidates.
Sources: Estok, David. "'Nice guy' Bob Morrow jubilant", The Hamilton Spectator, November 13, 1985, News, A6.

== City council election ==
=== Ward 1 (Chedoke-Cootes) ===
The race for Ward One alderman was the third time in as many years that electors would go to the polls to select a new member of city council. In early 1985, incumbent alderman Peter Peterson was elected to the Ontario legislature as a Progressive Conservative, triggering a by-election in which former alderman Paul Drage recaptured a seat on council. This came after his loss to Peterson and Mary Kiss in 1982, after capturing the seat vacated after his wife and the area's alderman, Kay Drage, died in 1979.

Drage and Kiss campaigned on their record of standing in opposition to the city's proposed GO-ALRT plan due to proposals that would have expropriated property along York Boulevard in the ward's north end. As sitting members of council, they instead rested their transit hopes on the promise of expanded GO Train service.

Drage, 61 at the time of the election, stood on a platform called for an expansion of the area's highways, including completing the Red Hill Valley Expressway and the mid-mountain expressway, as well as advocating for more supermarkets in the area. Kiss, who refused to give her age to the Hamilton Spectator, opposed GO Transit expansion and promoted investment in local industry.

Terry Cooke, a candidate in the by-election that occurred earlier in the year, promoted a rapid transit link to Toronto using existing heavy rail infrastructure and advocated reinstating the Board of Control. Joanne Gallacher, a 31-year-old business owner, promoted a rapid transit solution and improvements to the city's bayfront. David Gava, a 22-year-old student, called for dismantling regional government and improving rental accommodations. Two law-enforcement officials, 54-year-old Frank Preston and Victor Zwirewich, 61 at the time of the vote, both ran on conservative platforms, with Preston calling for an end to city council 'freeloading' and Zwirewich promoting a law-and-order platform.

The Hamilton Spectator endorsed Cooke and Zwirewich for the two aldermanic positions. Cooke was CCH's preferred candidate for election.

Summary of the November 12, 1985 Hamilton, Ontario Ward One alderman election
Candidate	Popular vote		Elected?
Candidate	Votes	%	Elected?
Terry Cooke	5,970	55.79%	
Mary Kiss (incumbent)	4,384	40.97%	
Paul Drage (incumbent)	3,410	31.87%	
Vic Zwirewich	2,822	26.37%	
Joanne Gallacher	1,053	9.84%	
Frank Preston	587	5.80%	
David Gava	481	4.76%	
Total votes	10,701		
Registered voters	28,533	37.50%	
Note 1: Each ward elected two aldermen and percentages are specific to each candidate, not for the overall total. Note 2: All Hamilton municipal elections are officially non-partisan. Note 3: Candidate campaign colours are based on the prominent colour used in campaign items (signs, literature, etc.) and are used as a visual differentiation between candidates.
Sources: Coutts, Jane. "Result in Ward 1 seen as strong call for change", Hamilton Spectator, November 13, 1985, A7.

=== Ward 2 (Downtown) ===
Summary of the November 12, 1985 Hamilton, Ontario Ward Two alderman election
Candidate	Popular vote		Elected?
Candidate	Votes	%	Elected?
Vince Agro (incumbent)	3,998		
Bill McCulloch (incumbent)	3,407		
John Roy	2,086		
William Laidlaw	1,647		
Peter Rhodes	1,363		
Catherine Macinnis	1,363		
Joe Chiarelli	589		
Jim Travale	394		
John McCabe	212		
Total votes			
Registered voters	28,834		
Note 1: Each ward elected two aldermen and percentages are specific to each candidate, not for the overall total. Note 2: All Hamilton municipal elections are officially non-partisan. Note 3: Candidate campaign colours are based on the prominent colour used in campaign items (signs, literature, etc.) and are used as a visual differentiation between candidates.
Sources: MacNeil, Mark. "Agro, McCulloch buck the trend for change", Hamilton Spectator, November 13, 1985, News, A7.

=== Ward 3 (Hamilton Centre) ===
Summary of the November 12, 1985 Hamilton, Ontario Ward Three alderman election
Candidate	Popular vote		Elected?
Candidate	Votes	%	Elected?
Pat Valeriano	5,169		
Brian Hinkley (incumbent)	4,318		
Mike Davidson	4,084		
Don Drury	2,603		
Peter Boldrini	1,890		
Bill Dickens	1,052		
Frank MacDonald	547		
Caesar Tam	317		
Total votes			
Registered voters	30,317		
Note 1: Each ward elected two aldermen and percentages are specific to each candidate, not for the overall total. Note 2: All Hamilton municipal elections are officially non-partisan. Note 3: Candidate campaign colours are based on the prominent colour used in campaign items (signs, literature, etc.) and are used as a visual differentiation between candidates.
Sources: Porter, Brian. "Valeriano stages comeback", Hamilton Spectator, November 13, 1985, A7.

=== Ward 4 (East Hamilton) ===
Summary of the November 12, 1985 Hamilton, Ontario Ward Four alderman election
Candidate	Popular vote		Elected?
Candidate	Votes	%	Elected?
Geraldine Copps	5,992	48.33%	
David Christopherson	4,958	40%	
Don Gray (incumbent)	3,069	24.75%	
Vince Scott (incumbent)	2,883	23.25%	
John Ellis	2,373	19.14%	
Gaspare Bonomo	878	7.08%	
Larry Wheaton	535	4.32%	
Bob Fanjoy	289	2.33%	
Total votes	12,398		
Registered voters			
Note 1: Each ward elected two aldermen and percentages are specific to each candidate, not for the overall total. Note 2: All Hamilton municipal elections are officially non-partisan. Note 3: Candidate campaign colours are based on the prominent colour used in campaign items (signs, literature, etc.) and are used as a visual differentiation between candidates.
Sources: Wilson, Paul. "That old Copps magic still works", Hamilton Spectator, November 13, 1985, A7.

=== Ward 5 (Red Hill) ===
Summary of the November 12, 1985 Hamilton, Ontario Ward Five alderman election
Candidate	Popular vote		Elected?
Candidate	Votes	%	Elected?
Shirley Collins (incumbent)	6,238		
Reg Wheeler	3,608		
Fred Lombardo (incumbent)	2,439		
Mark Campbell	1,588		
Ralph Musitano	1,421		
Tom Rusich	1,377		
Ozzie Ferguson	572		
Total votes			
Registered voters			
Note 1: Each ward elected two aldermen and percentages are specific to each candidate, not for the overall total. Note 2: All Hamilton municipal elections are officially non-partisan. Note 3: Candidate campaign colours are based on the prominent colour used in campaign items (signs, literature, etc.) and are used as a visual differentiation between candidates.
Sources: Pettapiece, Mike. "Collins won the most votes of any alderman", Hamilton Spectator, November 13, 1985, A7.

=== Ward 6 (East Mountain) ===
Summary of the November 12, 1985 Hamilton, Ontario Ward Six alderman election
Candidate	Popular vote		Elected?
Candidate	Votes	%	Elected?
John Smith	5,718		
Paul Cowell (incumbent)	5,320		
Tom Jackson	4,384		
David Bach	2,153		
Bob Fasching	1,754		
Vince Formosi	1,655		
Fred White	437		
Gerald Marchildon	289		
Total votes			
Registered voters	27,735		
Note 1: Each ward elected two aldermen and percentages are specific to each candidate, not for the overall total. Note 2: All Hamilton municipal elections are officially non-partisan. Note 3: Candidate campaign colours are based on the prominent colour used in campaign items (signs, literature, etc.) and are used as a visual differentiation between candidates.
Sources: Howard, Rob. "John Smith back after 18-year absence", Hamilton Spectator, November 13, 1985, A7.

=== Ward 7 (Central Mountain) ===
Summary of the November 12, 1985 Hamilton, Ontario Ward Seven alderman election
Candidate	Popular vote		Elected?
Candidate	Votes	%	Elected?
John Gallagher	5,574		
Henry Merling (incumbent)	5,224		
Ken Edge	4,755		
Bruce Charlton (incumbent)	4,341		
Steven Cooper	1,285		
Danny Stanidis	459		
Fred Jongeling	438		
Total votes			
Registered voters			
Note 1: Each ward elected two aldermen and percentages are specific to each candidate, not for the overall total. Note 2: All Hamilton Municipal Elections are officially non-partisan. Note 3: Candidate campaign colours are based on the prominent colour used in campaign items (signs, literature, etc.) and are used as a visual differentiation between candidates.
Sources: Von Appen, Kevin. "Victorious barber will take polls on issues", Hamilton Spectator, November 13, 1985, A7.

=== Ward 8 (West Mountain) ===
Summary of the November 12, 1985 Hamilton, Ontario Ward Eight alderman election
Candidate	Popular vote		Elected?
Candidate	Votes	%	Elected?
Tom Murray(incumbent)	4,883	41.12%	
Don Ross	4,419	37.21%	
Jim Bethune (incumbent)	4,291	36.14%	
Vince Curtis	2,696	22.7%	
Bruce Aikman	2,536	21.36%	
Lorna Kippen	1,892	15.93%	
Total votes	11,875	41.88%	
Registered voters	28,354		
Note 1: Each ward elected two aldermen and percentages are specific to each candidate, not for the overall total. Note 2: All Hamilton municipal elections are officially non-partisan. Note 3: Candidate campaign colours are based on the prominent colour used in campaign items (signs, literature, etc.) and are used as a visual differentiation between candidates.
Sources: Dreschel, Andrew. "Newcomer Don Ross upsets veteran Jim Bethune", Hamilton Spectator, November 13, 1985, A7.

== See also ==
- List of Hamilton, Ontario, municipal elections
