= 1991 Hamilton, Ontario, municipal election =

Canadian municipal election

Hamilton Municipal Election, 1991
- November 12, 1991
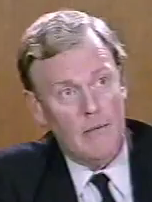
		BH
Candidate	Bob Morrow	Brian Hinkley
Popular vote	68,374	17,143
Percentage	75.35%	18.89%
Mayor before election
Bob Morrow
Elected mayor
Bob Morrow

The 1991 Hamilton municipal election was a municipal election held on November 12, 1994, to select one regional chairman, one mayor, two aldermen for each of the city's eight wards for a total of sixteen members of the Hamilton, Ontario City Council, and members of both English and French public and Catholic school boards. This election marked one of the most stunning turnovers in local history, with four incumbent aldermen being defeated by political newcomers, and Ward 3 Alderman Brian Hinkley being soundly defeated in his bid for the mayoralty against incumbent Mayor Bob Morrow.

== Regional chairman election ==
Summary of the November 12, 1991, Hamilton, Ontario regional chairman election
Candidate	Popular vote		
Candidate	Votes	%	±%
Reg Whynott (incumbent)	54,464	64.77%	+29.74%
Janice Wilson	12,139	14.44%	n/a
Julie Tozzi	9,340	11.11%	n/a
Eiflon Ivor Wynne	4,632	5.51%	n/a
Gerard Marchildon	3,516	4.18%	n/a
Total votes	84,091	100%	
Registered voters	n/a	n/a	n/a
Note: All Hamilton municipal elections are officially non-partisan. Note: Candidate campaign colours are based on the prominent colour used in campaign items (signs, literature, etc.) and are used as a visual differentiation between candidates.
Sources: Poling, Jim. "Whynott strolls to easy win in race for chair," Hamilton Spectator, Wednesday, November 13, 1991, Metro, B1.

== Mayoral election ==
In late October, an article ran in the Hamilton Spectator critiquing the mayor for what was perceived as political self-aggrandizing while noting that his 1988–1991 term was marked by successes for the city. In the piece, Morrow noted that he felt his strongest competition would come from Ward 3 Alderman Brian Hinkley, a New Democrat with an extensive record at city hall.

In early debates, most notably one hosted by Hamilton's Junior Chamber of Commerce, Hinkley was an aggressive opponent of Morrow's leadership style, accusing the mayor of "over-promising and under-delivering to the community." Morrow attacked Hinkley for his ties to the New Democrats and his stance on the Red Hill Valley Parkway.

Hinkley focused his campaign on the lack of real choice offered to Hamiltonian voters in past elections, even running with the slogan, "This time you have a real choice." Widely critiqued in local media for leading what was known as the "Gang of Four" New Democratic caucus on council, Hinkley gained a reputation as a strong worker with community-based issues, relating well with constituents and ensuring that Hamilton's marginalized people had a voice at the decision making table.

For his part in the race, Michael Baldasaro attempted to repeat his 1988 success, garnering over 7,500 votes against Morrow. Baldasaro announced he would be creating political trading cards for his campaign, though there was no follow-up as to the status of the project. Though he was contesting the mayoral election, a disciple of his Church of the Universe sought election in Ward 6, dividing Baldasro and campaign manager Walter Tucker's attention.

Political newcomer Bill Jones as, at the time, a 30-year-old employee of Dofasco, was less than enthusiastic about his chances, telling the Spectator he did not expect to win, rather make a statement about the state of Hamilton's politics at the time. Jones was not affiliated with any political party, and had not sought elected office before entering the race for mayor. An advocate of more direct democracy, Jones wanted to cut the mayor's salary and put constituent needs ahead of political goals. When asked why he did not seek the open aldermanic seat in Ward 3 where he lived, Jones said that he felt the mayor would have more say.

Summary of the November 11, 1991 Hamilton, Ontario mayoral election
Candidate	Popular vote		
Candidate	Votes	%	±%
Robert Morrow (incumbent)	68,374	75.35%	n/a
Brian Hinkley	17,143	18.89%	n/a
Bill Jones	2,723	3.0%	n/a
Michael Baldasaro	2,507	2.8%	n/a
Total votes	90,747	100%	
Registered voters	n/a	n/a	n/a
Note: All Hamilton municipal elections are officially non-partisan. Note: Candidate campaign colours are based on the prominent colour used in campaign items (signs, literature, etc.) and are used as a visual differentiation between candidates.
Sources: Peters, Ken. "Morrow took freeway to victory", Hamilton Spectator, Wednesday, November 13, 1991, Metro, B1.

== City council election ==
=== Ward One (West Hamilton-McMaster) ===
Summary of the November 12, 1991 Hamilton, Ontario Ward One alderman election
Candidate	Popular vote		
Candidate	Votes	%	±%
Terry Cooke (incumbent)	6,969	64.53%	+21.44%
Mary Kiss (incumbent)	5,608	49.15%	+12.51%
Charles Renauld	2,542	23.54%	n/a
Joyce Lowe	1,409	13.05%	n/a
Pat Ielasi	983	9.1%	n/a
Total votes	10,799	Note 1	
Registered voters	n/a		n/a
Note 1: Each ward elected two aldermen, and percentages are specific to each candidate, not for the overall total. Note 2: All Hamilton municipal elections are officially non-partisan. Note 3: Candidate campaign colours are based on the prominent colour used in campaign items (signs, literature, etc.) and are used as a visual differentiation between candidates.
Sources: Morrison, Suzanne. "Incumbents win in a cakewalk", Hamilton Spectator, Wednesday, November 13, 1991, Metro, B1.

=== Ward Two (Downtown) ===
Summary of the November 12, 1991 Hamilton, Ontario Ward Two alderman election
Candidate	Popular vote		
Candidate	Votes	%	±%
Vince Agro (incumbent)	3,643	44.15%	-5.63%
Bill McCulloch (incumbent)	2,851	34.55%	-13.61%
Peter Hill	2,408	29.18%	n/a
William Laidlaw	1,938	23.49%	-11.92%
Brian Morris	763	9.25%	n/a
Dolores Marks	617	7.48%	n/a
Bob Mann	505	6.12%	n/a
Total votes	8,252	Note 1	
Registered voters	28,848	30.44%	n/a
Note 1: Each ward elected two aldermen, and percentages are specific to each candidate, not for the overall total. Note 2: All Hamilton municipal elections are officially non-partisan. Note 3: Candidate campaign colours are based on the prominent colour used in campaign items (signs, literature, etc.) and are used as a visual differentiation between candidates.
Sources: MacPhail, Wayne. "Veteran savours 'last' victory", Hamilton Spectator, Wednesday, November 13, 1991, Metro, B2.

=== Ward Three (East Hamilton-Stipley) ===
Summary of the November 12, 1991 Hamilton, Ontario Ward Three alderman election
Candidate	Popular vote		
Candidate	Votes	%	±%
Don Drury (incumbent)	5,123	51.98%	n/a
Bernie Morelli	3,505	35.56%	n/a
Doreen Johnson	1,868	18.95%	n/a
Alan Whittle	1,271	12.90%	n/a
Fabio Chiapetta	906	9.51%	n/a
John Crawford	731	9.20%	n/a
Edward Partito	668	6.78%	n/a
Danny Stanidis	525	5.33%	n/a
Roger Lavoie	290	2.94%	n/a
James Steven Faner	120	1.22%	n/a
Total votes	9,856	Note 1	
Registered voters	n/a	n/a	n/a
Note 1: Each ward elected two aldermen, and percentages are specific to each candidate, not for the overall total. Note 2: All Hamilton municipal elections are officially non-partisan. Note 3: Candidate campaign colours are based on the prominent colour used in campaign items (signs, literature, etc.) and are used as a visual differentiation between candidates.
Sources: Lefaive, Doug. "Newcomer pledges 'vitality, teamwork" Hamilton Spectator, November 13, 1991, Metro, B1.

=== Ward Four (East Hamilton-Barton) ===
Summary of the November 12, 1991 Hamilton, Ontario Ward Four alderman election
Candidate	Popular vote		
Candidate	Votes	%	±%
Geraldine Copps (incumbent)	6,554	66.20%	-3.15%
Dave Wilson (incumbent)	4,964	50.14%	(Note 2) n/a
Murray Kilgour	1,669	16.86%	n/a
James Monahan	1,453	14.68%	n/a
Total votes	9,900	Note 1	
Registered voters	n/a	n/a	n/a
Note 1: Each ward elected two aldermen, and percentages are specific to each candidate, not for the overall total. Note 2: Wilson was elected in a 1990 by-election. Note 3: All Hamilton municipal elections are officially non-partisan. Note 4: Candidate campaign colours are based on the prominent colour used in campaign items (signs, literature, etc.) and are used as a visual differentiation between candidates.
Sources: Holt, Jim. ""Copps, Wilson sweep back into office", Hamilton Spectator, November 13, 1991, Metro, B2.

=== Ward Five (Red Hill-Rosedale) ===
Summary of the November 12, 1991 Hamilton, Ontario Ward Five alderman election
Candidate	Popular vote		
Candidate	Votes	%	±%
Dominic Agostino (incumbent)	7,697	62.35%	+1.46%
Fred Eisenberger	3,191	25.85%	n/a
Reg Wheeler	3,159	25.59%	n/a
Fred Lombardo (incumbent)	2,984	24.17%	-8.56%
Tommy Tarpos	2,178	17.64%	n/a
Fiore Manganiello	347	2.81%	n/a
Total votes	12,344	Note 1	
Registered voters	n/a	n/a	n/a
Note 1: Each ward elected two aldermen, and percentages are specific to each candidate, not for the overall total. Note 2: All Hamilton municipal elections are officially non-partisan. Note 3: Candidate campaign colours are based on the prominent colour used in campaign items (signs, literature, etc.) and are used as a visual differentiation between candidates.
Sources: Elliot, James. "Newcomer Eisenberger wins squeaker", Hamilton Spectator, Wednesday, November 13, 1991, Metro, B2.

=== Ward Six (East Mountain) ===
Summary of the November 12, 1991 Hamilton, Ontario Ward Six alderman election
Candidate	Popular vote		
Candidate	Votes	%	±%
Tom Jackson (incumbent)	7,916	58.55%	+4.83%
Bob Charters	3,733	27.61%	(Note 2) n/a
Vince Formosi (incumbent)	3,519	26.03%	(Note 2) n/a
Don Clarke	2,894	21.40%	n/a
Greg Peitchinis	2,224	16.45%	n/a
Charles Eleveld	1,355	10.02%%	(Note 2) n/a
Peter O'Hagan	686	5.07%	-7.11%
Daniel Henry Morgan	191	1.41%	n/a
Total votes	13,521	Note 1	
Registered voters	n/a	n/a	n/a
Note 1: Each ward elected two aldermen, and percentages are specific to each candidate, not for the overall total. Note 2: Formosi, Charters, and Eleveid all contested a 1990 November by-election. Note 3: All Hamilton municipal elections are officially non-partisan. Note 4: Candidate campaign colours are based on the prominent colour used in campaign items (signs, literature, etc.) and are used as a visual differentiation between candidates.
Sources: Humphreys, Adrian. "Jackson sweeps field in landslide win", The Hamilton Spectator, November 13, 1991, Metro, B2.

=== Ward Seven (Central Mountain) ===
Summary of the November 12, 1991 Hamilton, Ontario Ward Seven alderman election
Candidate	Popular vote		
Candidate	Votes	%	±%
Henry Merling (incumbent)	8,218	50.66%	-15.23%
Terry Anderson	7,298	45.00%	n/a
John Gallagher (incumbent)	4,118	25.38%	-25.04%
Michael Ecker	3,609	22.25%	n/a
Carol O'Hagan	3,008	18.54%	n/a
Total votes	16,223	Note 1	
Registered voters	n/a	n/a	n/a
Note 1: Each ward elected two aldermen, and percentages are specific to each candidate, not for the overall total. Note 2: All Hamilton municipal elections are officially non-partisan. Note 3: Candidate campaign colours are based on the prominent colour used in campaign items (signs, literature, etc.) and are used as a visual differentiation between candidates.
Sources: Morison, Jill. "'Gallagher blames media for humbling defeat", The Hamilton Spectator, November 13, 1991, Metro, B2.

=== Ward Eight (West Mountain) ===
Summary of the November 12, 1991 Hamilton, Ontario Ward Eight alderman election
Candidate	Popular vote		
Candidate	Votes	%	±%
Don Ross (incumbent)	8,407	55.67%	+9.06%
Frank D'Amico	6,524	43.20%	n/a
Tom Murray (incumbent)	4,813	31.87%	-13.17%
Mike Oddi	2,438	16.14%	-2.16%
John Ross	2,128	14.09%	n/a
John Lewis	546	3.62%	-6.08%
Total votes	15,102	Note 1	
Registered voters	n/a	n/a	n/a
Note 1: Each ward elected two aldermen, and percentages are specific to each candidate, not for the overall total. Note 2: All Hamilton municipal elections are officially non-partisan. Note 3: Candidate campaign colours are based on the prominent colour used in campaign items (signs, literature, etc.) and are used as a visual differentiation between candidates.
Sources: Benedetti, Paul. "'Political bully' gets a sound thrashing", The Hamilton Spectator, November 13, 1991, Metro, B2.

== See also ==
- List of Hamilton, Ontario, municipal elections
