= Brebeuf (disambiguation) =

Jean de Brébeuf (1593–1649) was a Jesuit missionary who was martyred in Canada.

Brebeuf or Jean de Brébeuf may also refer to:

== Places ==
- Brébeuf, Quebec
- Saint-Jean-de-Brébeuf, Quebec
- Brébeuf Lake, Quebec

== People ==
- Georges de Brébeuf (1618–1661), French poet and translator

== Schools ==
- Brebeuf College School, Toronto, Ontario
- Brebeuf Jesuit Preparatory School, Indianapolis, Indiana
- St. Jean de Brebeuf Catholic High School, Woodbridge, Ontario
- St. Jean de Brébeuf Catholic Secondary School, Hamilton, Ontario
- St. John Brebeuf Regional Secondary, Abbotsford, British Columbia
- St. Jean de Brebeuf Elementary School, Brantford, Ontario
- Collège Jean-de-Brébeuf, Montreal, Quebec

== Churches ==
- St. John Brebeuf Catholic Church, Niles, Illinois
