= 2018 Hamilton, Ontario, municipal election =

Canadian municipal election

2018 Hamilton municipal election
- October 22, 2018
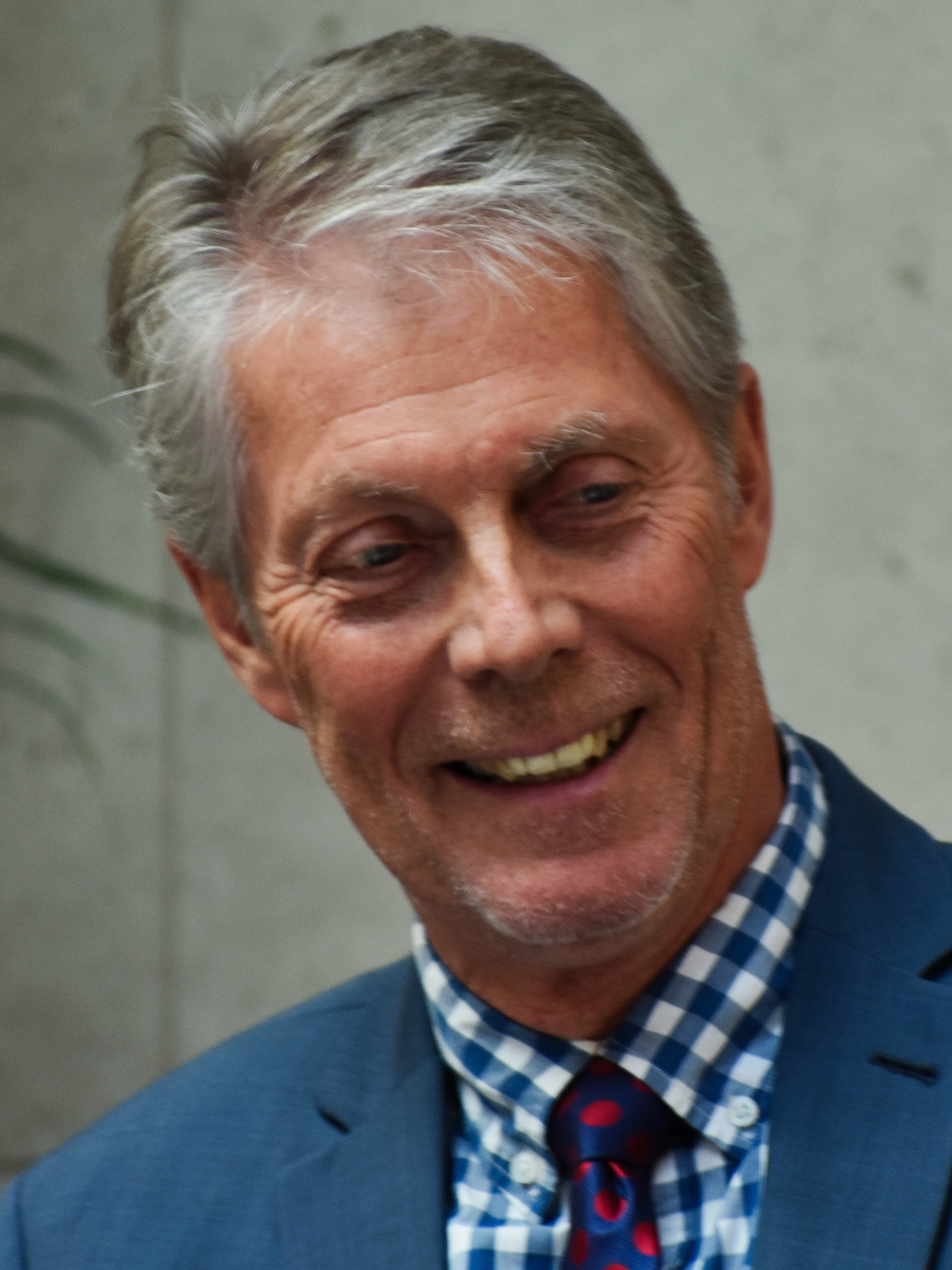

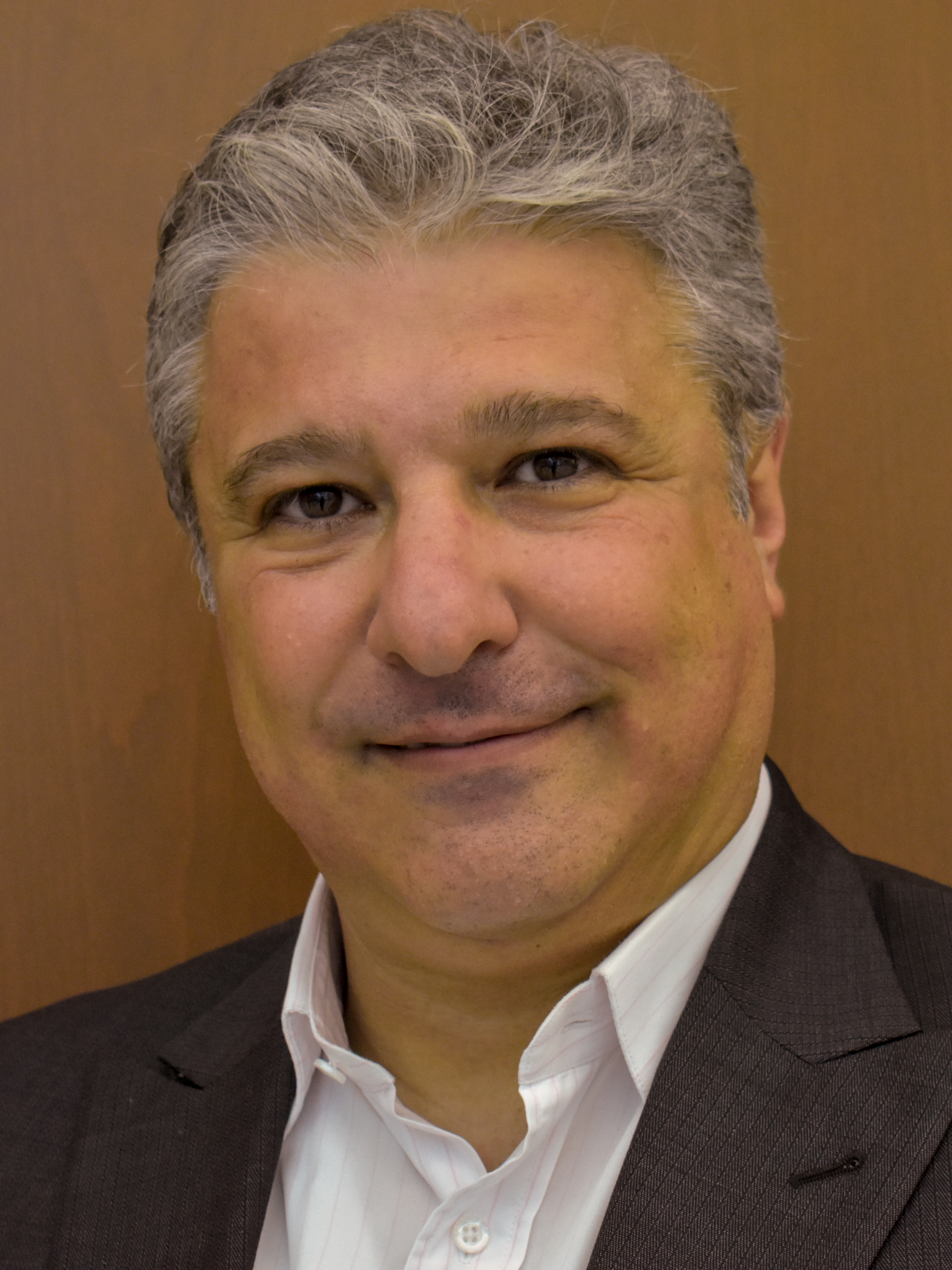
Candidate	Fred Eisenberger	Vito Sgro
Popular vote	74,093	52,190
Percentage	54.03%	38.06%
Swing	▲14.1pp	n/a
Mayor before election
Fred Eisenberger
Elected mayor
Fred Eisenberger

The 2018 Hamilton municipal election occurred on October 22, 2018, as per the Ontario Municipal Elections Act, 1996. Residents of Hamilton selected one mayor, members of the Hamilton City Council, and members of both the English and French public and Catholic school boards.

On election day, Hamiltonians re-elected Fred Eisenberger to serve his third term as mayor of the City of Hamilton. He is the first mayor since amalgamation to be re-elected for two consecutive terms.

== Issues ==
=== Council ward boundary reform ===
In June 2012, councillors committed $260,000 to conduct a study that would examine boundary reform in 2015, with a proposal to come forward regarding changes for the 2018 municipal election. This was following the 2006–2010 and 2010–2014 councils opting to push an examination of ward boundaries into the next council term.

The issue arose during the 2014 municipal election, with Hamilton's three top mayoral contenders supporting ward boundary reform during their campaigns. In early 2015, councillors approved city staff's request to put out a call for proposals for the consultants who would examine ward boundaries. The successful bidders, Watson and Associates Economists Ltd., then began a process of public consultation and examination. Throughout February 2016, community consolation meetings were held across Hamilton to inform the public and collect feedback from residents.

The final report presented a number of options for changing the city's existing boundaries. On February 8, 2017, councillors voted to reject the consultant reports and redraw the city's ward boundaries themselves, opting to avoid any substantial boundary changes, except for a minor ascetic alteration to the boundary between Ward 6 and Ward 7 on the East Mountain. The change was controversial, with community tensions flaring at the approval meeting. Robert Williams, one of the consultants the city hired to study the boundaries told council Watson and Associates could not support the changes, saying, "I've told you in black and white, we couldn't endorse it." Ward 3 Councillor Matthew Green stated that he believed the approved wards were councillors 'gerrymandering' boundaries.

In response to the controversy, local residents appealed council's decision to the Ontario Municipal Board (OMB). After holding a series of hearings in October, the OMB struck down the city's redrawn boundaries and imposed a new electoral map for the 2018 election. The new map eliminated a distinct ward for the former municipality of Wentworth, and significantly altered boundaries across the city, most notably providing another ward to the city's West Mountain.

In January, 2018, local media reported that a group of residents from Hamilton's suburbs, working under the name "Free Flamborough", had taken issue with the imposed boundaries and council's decision to not pursue an appeal. The group, led by Flamborough resident Roman Sarachman, had begun exploring options such as launching legal action against the municipal government, or pressuring the provincial government for the right to de-amalgamate from Hamilton

=== School board ward boundary reform ===
The Hamilton-Wentworth District School Board's (HWDSB) attempt to reallocate the ward boundaries for trustees in 2013 also resulted in the decision to task the 2014–2018 Board with examining ward boundary reform after city council redraws boundaries. Following the OMB decision on Hamilton's council wards, the HWDSB and Hamilton-Wentworth Catholic District School Board (HWCDSB) sought relief from a provincially-imposed March 31, 2018 deadline to update their respective ward boundaries, but were denied a stay by the provinces' Ministry of Municipal Affairs and Ministry of Education

The HWCDSB was the first board to meet the provincially-imposed deadline, with Catholic trustees opting to abandon their long-standing practice of having two trustees elected for Ward 9, 10, and 11, and instead establishing single trustee seats for Ward 1, 2, and 15, Ward 8 and 14, Ward 9 and 11, and Ward 12 and 13. In mandating a single trustee for Ward 1, 2, and 15, the HWCDSB created the first non-contiguous electoral ward in the city's history.

The HWDSB initially proposed merging the newly constituted West Mountain Wards 8 and 14, as well as considering options that would blend Wards 5 and 10, and 9 and 11. Following a public survey in which 47 percent of respondents approved of the board's proposed changes, trustees voted 9–1 to pair Wards 8 and 14.

=== Ranked ballots ===
Following the 2014 provincial election, the Minister of Municipal Affairs and Housing, Ted McMeekin, announced the province would be reexamining the Municipal Elections Act, 1996 to determine if the length and voting systems of Ontario's municipal elections needed alterations. Part of the reexamination was a proposal that would have allowed municipalities to adopt a ranked ballot system for the 2018 municipal elections.

In June 2015, Hamilton's manager of elections, Tony Fallis, commented that the system would confuse electors, while Ward 3 councillor Matthew Green called the system a "fantastic opportunity." The following month, Green invited ranked ballot-advocate Dave Meslin to speak in Hamilton on the issue, sparking a call for a citizen's group to promote the proposed electoral system. Mayor Eisenberger spoke favourably about the new system and indicated he was willing to consider it for the 2018 election.

Despite this, in November, 2016, councillors rejected an attempt by Ward 3 Councillor Matthew Green to initiate a study into the feasibility of ranked balloting. Opponents of the plan called ranked ballots 'confusing' and worried they would hinder voter turnout. Council ultimately voted 9–5 against making any moves toward the change.

=== Light rail transit ===
Beginning in 2008, city council and Metrolinx, the transit agency responsible for projects across the Toronto and Hamilton areas, developed plans for a new rapid transit system in Hamilton to ease congestion on the city's Hamilton Street Railway (HSR) system. In September, 2008, a city-commissioned survey found that 94% of Hamiltonians surveyed supported investment in rapid transit with 66% supporting light rail transit (LRT), 8% favouring bus rapid transit (BRT), and 20% endorsing either option.

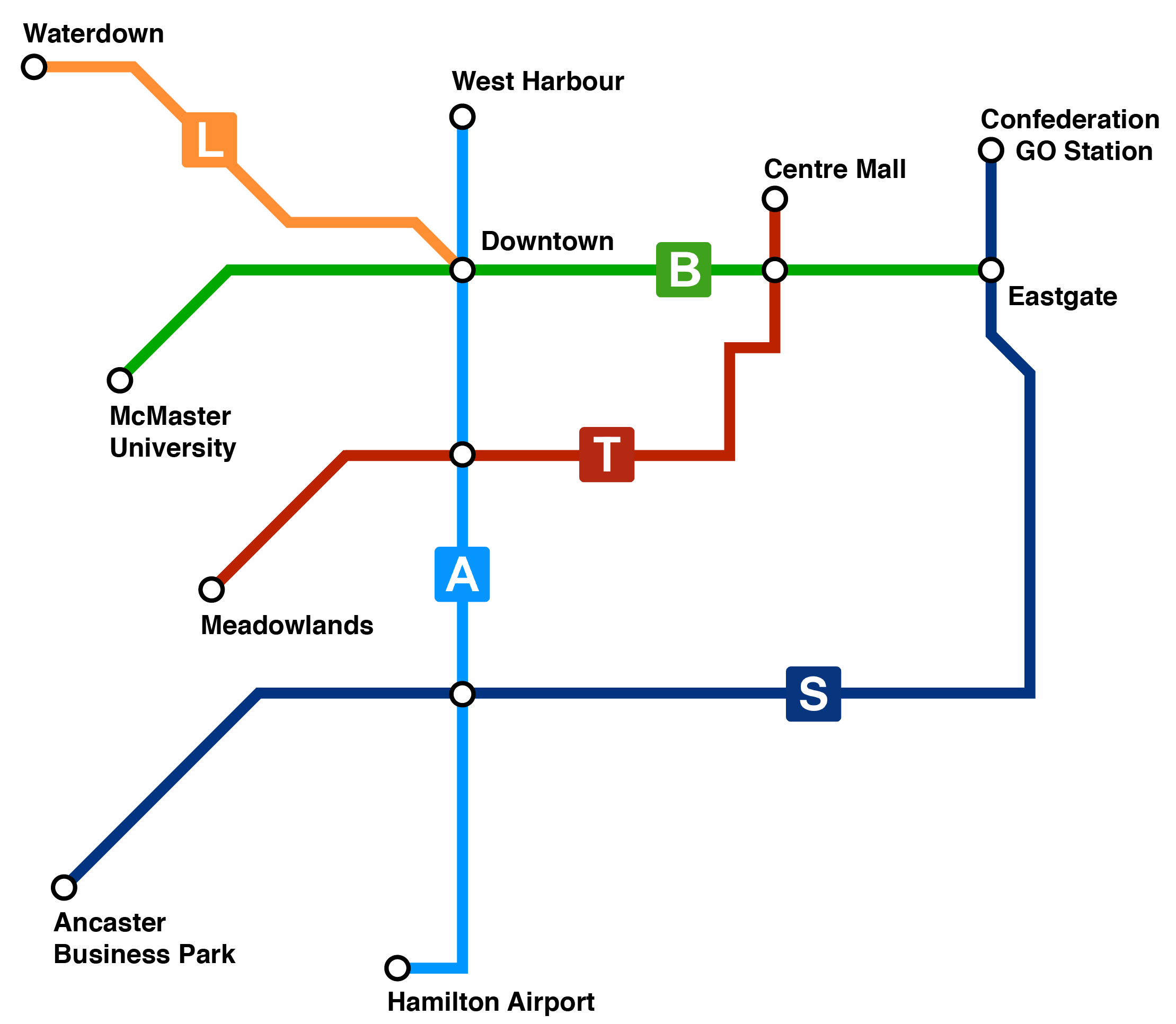
The proposed BLAST Network in Hamilton

Hamilton City Council endorsed the BLAST network plan in 2008, which called for five rapid transit lines to be constructed across the city.

In 2014, the city's mayoral campaign focused heavily on the light rail issue, with Eisenberger and challenger Brian McHattie taking a position in favour of light rail while candidate Brad Clark opposed the project. Eisenberger won the race with 39.93%, while McHattie took 20.38%. Clark, who placed second, received 31.53% of the vote. Across Hamilton, pro-LRT councillors were elected with the express goal of supporting the project.

In early 2015, activists feared the HSR had abandoned hope the project would be successful, as the agency's new director, Dave Dixon, had submitted for council's approval a request for new express buses totaling $302 million.

Fears were abated in May, 2015, when Premier Kathleen Wynne and Transportation Minister Steven Del Duca announced the provincial government would fund the city's LRT project at 100% and invest in the construction of a new GO Train station in Stoney Creek at Centennial Parkway.

While the initial plan announced by the provincial government was to construct the city's B-Line LRT line with a 'spur' line to the West Harbour GO Station, in 2017, Metrolinx announced the 'spur' would be dropped from the project in favour of express bus service that would feed into the city's existing A-Line express bus line.

During the 2018 Ontario Provincial Election campaign, the Progressive Conservative Party sought to attract the support of anti-LRT advocates by suggesting the party would be open to disbursing the earmarked $1 billion for LRT to the city for use on general infrastructure. This caused Ward 6 councillor Tom Jackson, Ward 8 councillor Terry Whitehead, and Ward 12 councillor Lloyd Ferguson to openly discuss changing their votes in favour of LRT if the Progressive Conservatives won the June 7 vote.

== Mayoral election ==
Incumbent mayor Fred Eisenberger announced his intention to seek a third term in January 2018, aiming to continue the projects begun under his second administration. Speaking with CBC Hamilton, Eisenberger emphasized his commitment to a platform of economic development, improved public transit, and looking to public/private partnerships to build more affordable housing.

Edward Graydon, who sought the city's mayoralty in 2010, registered to run for mayor on the first day of nominations. Graydon was a vocal opponent of the city's planned LRT project, interjecting himself into a press conference held by Ward 8 Councillor Terry Whitehead and Ward 3 Councillor Matthew Green in 2017, interrupting Green by shouting "If you don't want LRT in this community, in 2018 vote for me, Edward Graydon, and I'll make this city the best city you've ever seen," and "Here's a motion: Get rid of Matthew Green. He's a terrible politician. You've got to get rid of him. You're only going to make the city great when I'm in." Graydon and Green have scuffled publicly in the time since the incident, with Graydon taking to social media in profanity-laced posts demanding apologies from the Ward 3 councillor.

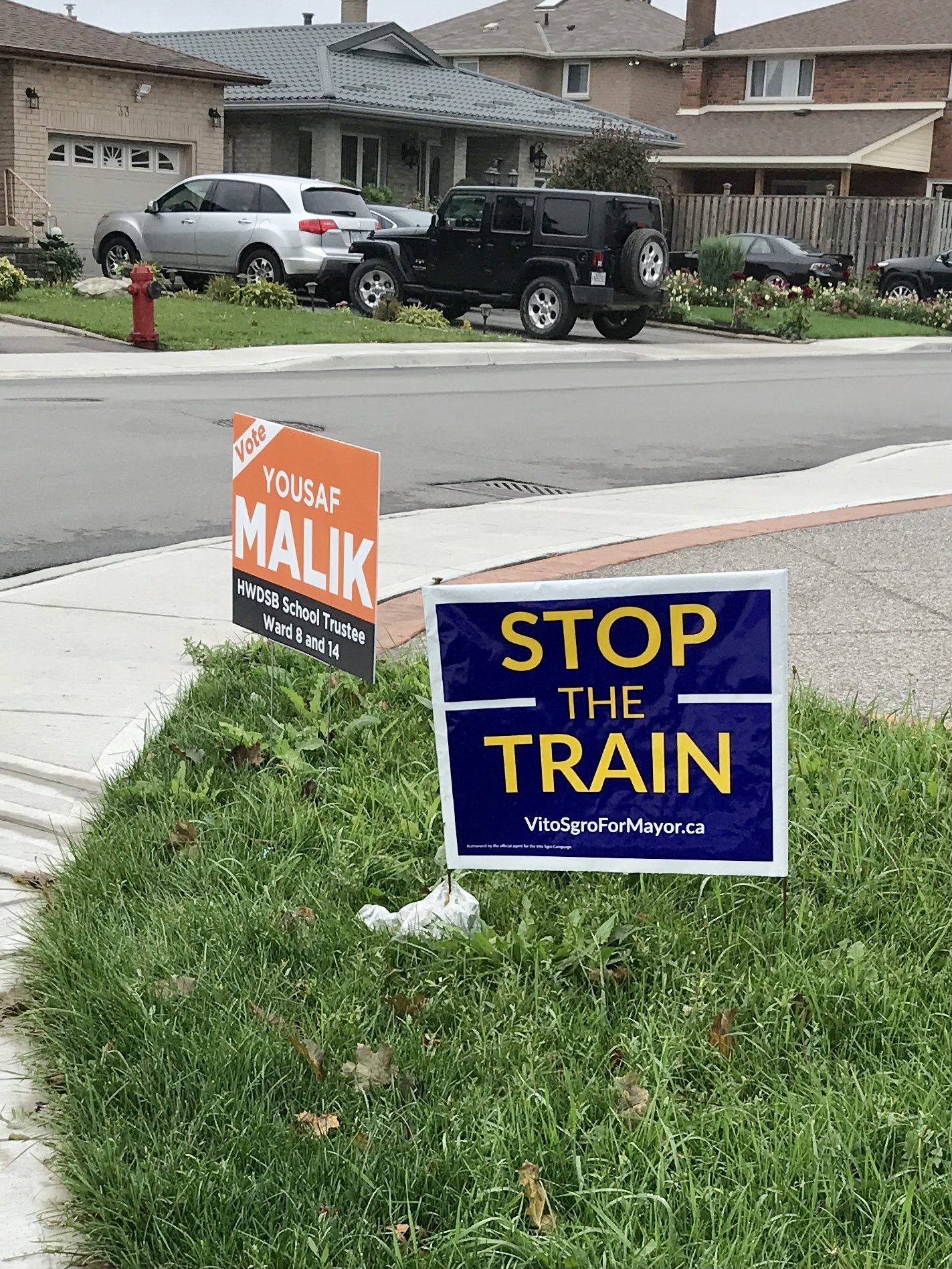
Election lawn signs in Hamilton's Falkirk East neighbourhood in October, 2018

Phil Ryerson, who placed last in the race for the city's mayoralty in 2014, registered to run on May 25, 2018. Ryerson's platform focused on cancelling the city's LRT plan, turning city streets into cement roads, and ending all in camera meetings.

Nathalie Xian Yi Yan, a traditional Chinese medicine practitioner who had lost two bids for Ward 6 councillor in 2006 and 2010, registered to run for mayor on May 31. Xian Yi Yan also unsuccessfully sought the provincial NDP nomination on Hamilton Mountain in 2007 and in Flamborough-Glanbrook in 2018.

On July 3, Ricky Tavares, who had finished in 10th place during the 2014 mayoral campaign, registered to seek the office again. Tavares was notable during that campaign for demanding Ryan McGreal, the editor of local affairs website Raise The Hammer, purchase marijuana seeds from him before he would answer questions from the media. Tavares again requested money from the media in exchange for answers to questions when approached by CBC Hamilton reporter Samantha Craggs in July, 2018. In response to an inquiry about his platform, Tavares told Craggs "Its (sic) gonna cost you $500 for this information. I am making it cheap for you because I think I remember you from city hall meetings many months ago and I think your (sic) beautiful. I like you."

Also on July 3, 2018, Vito Sgro, an organizer with the Liberal Party and past chair of the Hamilton Port Authority, announced he would be running for mayor on a platform of cancelling the city's LRT plan, hiring an auditor to study the city's finances, and changing the city's ward boundaries to create five superwards that conform to the city's federal and provincial ridings and would elect three councillors each. Sgro had been rumoured to jump into the race when he first signaled to Hamilton Spectator columnist Andrew Dreschel in January that he was considering a run.

On June 9, 2018, former federal Green Party candidate for Hamilton Centre, Ute Schmidt-Jones, registered to run for mayor. Schmidt-Jones was previously a candidate for city council in Midland, Ontario during the 2014 municipal campaign. Schmidt-Jones was banned from Hamilton City Hall after throwing pumpkin seeds adorned with smiley faces at Prime Minister Justin Trudeau in 2016 to protest his support for oil pipelines. Schmidt-Jones expressed support for the city's LRT plan.

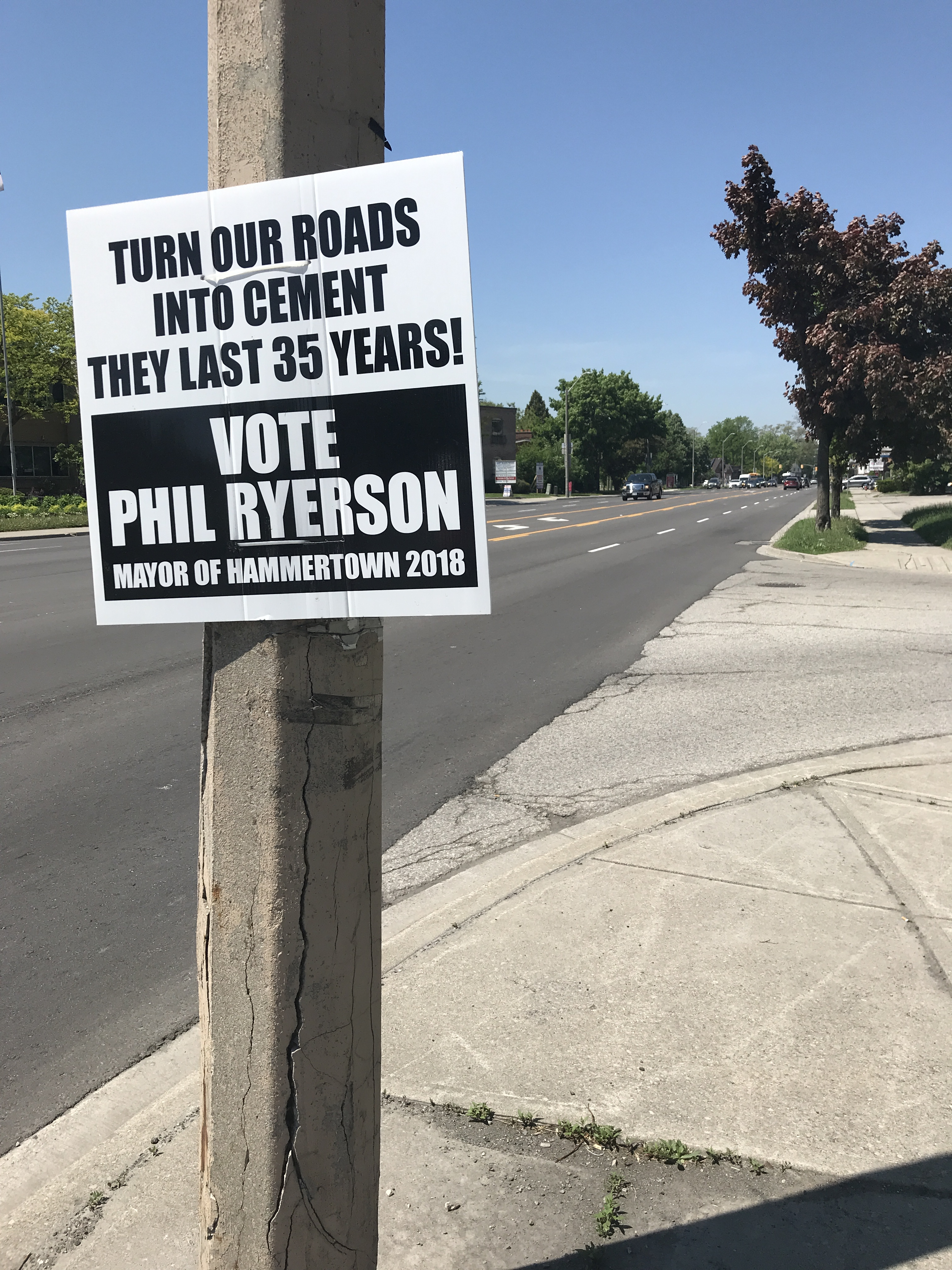
A campaign sign for mayoral candidate Phil Ryerson on Main Street West in the Westdale neighbourhood in late May, 2018

A week after entering the mayoral race, Sgro was the subject of some controversy when Joanna Chapman, a retired businesswoman and former Dundas town councillor, told local media that Sgro was the accountant who approved former Mayor Larry Di Ianni's financial statements during his 2003 mayoral campaign. In that campaign, Di Ianni accepted donations that exceeded the legal limit required by the Municipal Elections Act. In 2006, Di Ianni pleaded guilty to violating the Municipal Elections Act and was forced to return $26,000 in illegal contributions, make a $4,500 donation to charity, and write an essay on his actions. Chapman noted that Sgro, a registered accountant, had access to Di Ianni's campaign financials and was aware of the violation prior to signing off on the documents. Di Ianni pushed back against Chapman's accusations, telling Hamilton Spectator columnist Andrew Dreschel, "To sort of try to damage someone through innuendo — which, by the way, is a Joanna Chapman specialty — is just not fair."

On July 20, neo-Nazi, Holocaust-denier, and white-supremacist, Paul Fromm, registered to run for mayor of Hamilton. Fromm moved to Hamilton from Mississauga earlier in 2018. Fromm previously ran for Mayor of Mississauga in 2014 and, in the 2018 Ontario provincial election, stood as a candidate for the Canadians' Choice Party in Etobicoke Centre. Identified as a neo-Nazi by the Southern Poverty Law Centre, Fromm was fired from his job as a public school teacher in Peel Region after attending far-right events and shouting racial slurs.

Sgro launched his mayoral campaign with a $250-a-plate fundraiser on Thursday, August 9 at the Michelangelo Banquet Centre. In attendance were former Liberal candidate in Hamilton Centre and Hamilton Mountain, Javid Mirza (who served as one of Sgro's campaign advisors), Michelle Stockwell, a former Liberal candidate in Hamilton East-Stoney Creek, and former Government House Leader in the cabinet of Paul Martin, Tony Valeri.

During one of the first mayoral debates of the campaign, hosted by local community cable channel Cable 14, mayoral contenders focused mainly on the city's planned light rail project. Sgro, Ryerson, Geissler, Fromm, and Graydon all took stances against the project, while George Rusich, Schmid-Jones, and Eisenberger were supportive. Sgro used the debate to advocate for road-widening schemes, while Fromm attempted to downplay his connections to white supremacist movements and focus on his advocacy for Hamilton's drivers. Schmid-Jones proposed banning bottled water from the city's facilities, while Eisenbeger promoted his record of reducing homelessness and integrating the city's transit network. During the debate, candidates Graydon and Carlos Gomes were cautioned against using foul language and personal attacks, while Gomes used the debate to defend his marijuana use, though did not reference the Federal government's planned legalization of the substance on October 17, five days before the municipal election. Mayoral candidate Tavares was again invited to the debate but demanded financial compensation to appear.

The issue of recreation facilities for people in Hamilton's suburban communities became an issue during the campaign, with Eisenberger pledging to conduct feasibility studies for rec centres in the next term of office. Pattison proposed the idea of reviewing all city facilities while Rusich promised to have a number of facilities built and operational by 2022.

On Election Day, October 22, Hamilton's residents gave incumbent Fred Eisenberger a second term as mayor. According to The Hamilton Spectator, Eisenberger is the "first mayor since amalgamation to survive back-to-back Hamilton elections."

=== Candidates ===
Candidates for the October 22, 2018 Hamilton, Ontario mayoral election
Candidate	Popular vote			Expenditures
Candidate	Votes	%	±%	Expenditures
Fred Eisenberger (incumbent)	74,093	54.03%	+14.1%	$114,534.00
Vito Sgro	52,190	38.06%	n/a	$228,890.71
George Rusich	2,220	1.62%	n/a	$8,692.00
Jim Davis	2,071	1.51%	n/a	$1,000.00
Nathalie Xian Yi Yan	1,286	0.94%	n/a	-^{1}
Michael Pattison	899	0.66%	+0.04	$2,282.60
Paul Fromm	706	0.51%	n/a	$7,189.16
Carlos Gomes	521	0.38%	n/a	$0.00
Todd May	500	0.36%	n/a	$0.00
Henry Geissler	494	0.36%	n/a	$1,178.53
Phil Ryerson	479	0.35%	+0.13%	-^{1}
Ute Schmid-Jones	463	0.34%	n/a	$3,016.28
Edward Graydon	409	0.30%	n/a	$2,526.30
Mark Wozny	408	0.30%	n/a	$0.00
Ricky Tavares	398	0.29%	-0.06%	$0.00
Total votes	138,549			
Registered voters	361,212	38.7%	+5.2%	
^{1} These candidates did not submit official financial statements and were, therefore, ineligible to run in the 2022 municipal election. Note: All Hamilton municipal elections are officially non-partisan. Note: Candidate campaign colours are based on the prominent colour used in campaign items (signs, literature, etc.) and are used as a visual differentiation between candidates.
Sources: City of Hamilton, "Nominated Candidates"

== City council election ==
=== Ward 1 ===
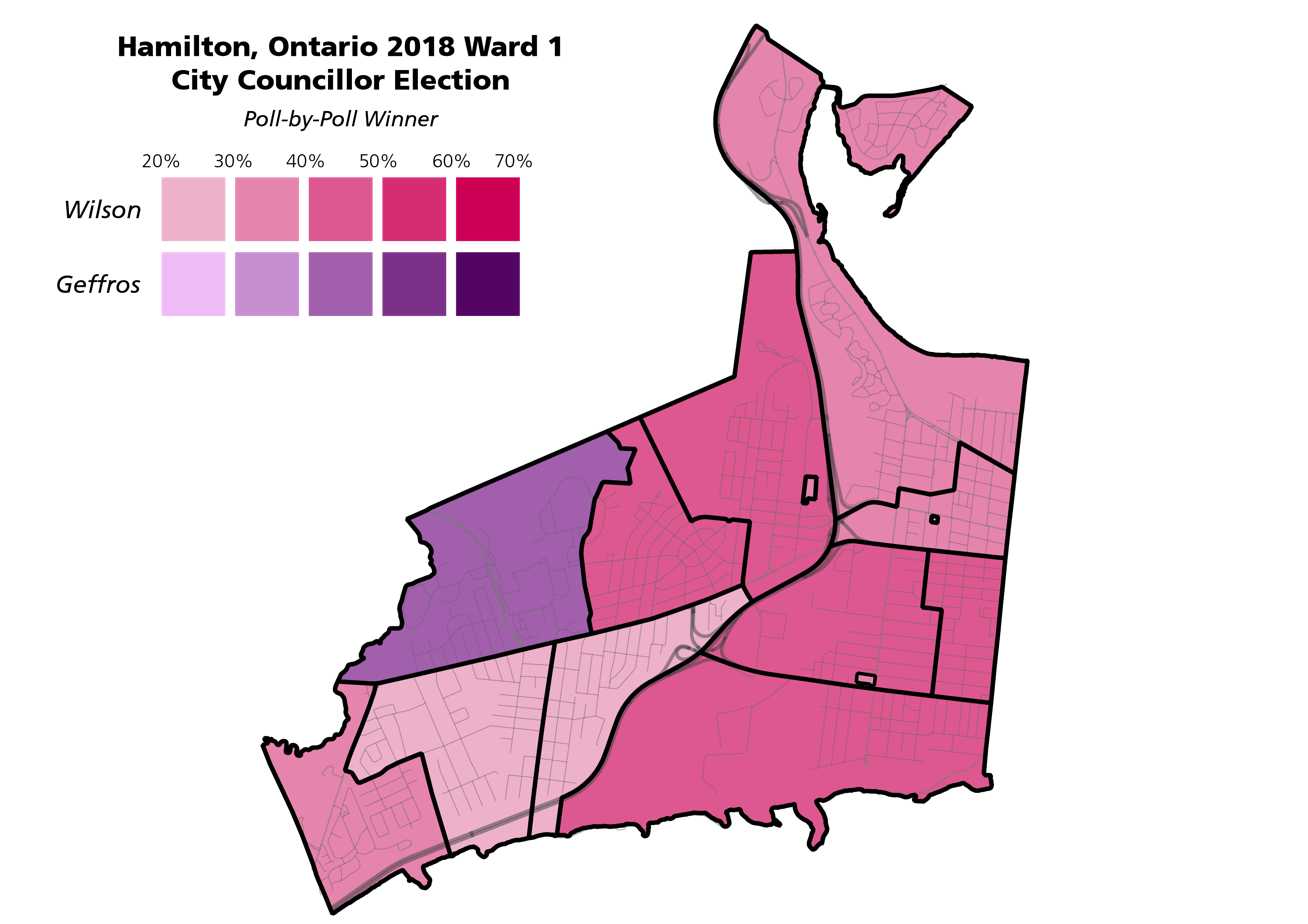
The poll-by-poll results for the Hamilton, Ontario Ward 1 city councillor election in 2018

Incumbent Ward 1 councillor Aidan Johnson registered for re-election on the day nominations opened, May 1. On the same day, McMaster graduate student and vice-president of the Hamilton West—Ancaster—Dundas NDP, Sophie Geffros, registered to seek the seat. Greffos' campaign focused on improving civic engagement and increasing dialogue in west Hamilton.

On July 18, nine days before the close of nominations, Johnson announced they were withdrawing their nomination to become the executive director of the Niagara Community Legal Clinic, which serves residents in Welland and St. Catharines.

Jason Allen, third-place candidate in 2014 and a former staffer with Metrolinx registered to contest the seat, touting an endorsement from Calgary Mayor Naheed Nenshi. Carol Lazich, one of the most vocal anti-LRT activists in the city campaigned on a platform of opposing the project. Maureen Wilson, a former staffer with Hamilton Mayor Bob Wade and partner to former Hamilton-Wentworth Regional Chair Terry Cooke campaigned on an urbanist platform. Wilson maintained support from across the political spectrum, earning the endorsements of former Ancaster-Dundas-Flamborough-Westdale MPP Ted McMeekin, then-NDP candidate for MP in Hamilton Centre Matthew Green, and former Hamilton Police Service Chief Ken Robertson.

Linda Narducci, a small-business owner and founding member of The Mustard Seed, a local organic co-operative, campaigned on improving pedestrian and cyclist safety as well as reviewing the ward's participatory budgeting project. Syed Bakht, a self-employed tax specialist and Jordan Geertsma, a local pub owner ran on campaigns skeptical of LRT. Lyla Miklos, a Unitarian lay chaplain and education worker sought the seat on a campaign of respecting the democratic process and speaking for marginalized Hamiltonians. Richard Massie, who lived in Ward 14, ran on a platform of redeveloping the Chedoke Golf Course, Sharon Cole focused on housing affordability, and Harrison White, the youngest candidate in the ward at the age of 22, focused on housing issues and hospital wait times. Ela Eroglu, a local architect, ran on a campaign of addressing poverty issues. Sharon Anderson, an Ainslie Wood resident, focused on better soliciting resident feedback on important projects.

Candidates for the October 22, 2018 Hamilton, Ontario Ward 1 councillor election
Candidate	Popular vote			Expenditures
Candidate	Votes	%	±%	Expenditures
Maureen Wilson	3,664	41.51%	-	$21,134.50
Jason Allen	1,501	17.00%	+4.98%	$7,260.00
Carol Lazich	1,060	12.01%	-	$9,080.60
Sophie Geffros	905	10.25%	-	$9,844.00
Lyla Miklos	294	3.33%	-	$5,234.14
Linda Narducci	238	2.70%	-	-^{1}
Richard Massie	235	2.66%	-	$2,314.95
Jordan Geertsma	202	2.29%	-	$5,570.00
Syed Bakht	162	1.84%	-	$1,080.01
Harrison White	157	1.78%	-	$904.48
Sharon Anderson	147	1.67%	-	$119.89
Ela Eroglu	137	1.55%	-	$4,300.00
Sharon Cole	125	1.42%	-	-^{1}
Total votes	8,827			
Registered voters	20,769	42.5%	+1.76%	
^{1} These candidates did not submit official financial statements and were, therefore, ineligible to run in the 2022 municipal election. Note: All Hamilton municipal elections are officially non-partisan. Note: Candidate campaign colours are based on the prominent colour used in campaign items (signs, literature, etc.) and are used as a visual differentiation between candidates.
Sources: City of Hamilton, "Nominated Candidates"

=== Ward 2 ===
Seeking a third term on council, incumbent Jason Farr faced competition from seven candidates. Cameron Kroetsch, a former union president and LGBT rights activist in Hamilton, and Nicole Smith, a local literacy centre manager, were the first candidates to register on May 1. They were followed by Suresh Venodh Daljeet and Mark Tennant in the following months. Farr registered on July 19, and was followed by James Unsworth, John Vail, and Diane Chiarelli on July 27, the final day of nominations.

Kroetsch, who received the support of previous challengers to Farr - Terri Wallis (2014) and Matt Jelly (2010) - as well as former Green Party federal and provincial candidate Peter Ormond, campaigned for better communication and allocation of the city's existing public housing stock.

A majority of the council candidates in Ward 2 indicated support for the city's light rail transit project, including Kroetsch, Daljeet, Smith, Farr, and another 2010 challenger of Farr's, Chiarelli. Tennant and 2014 council candidate and Progressive Conservative candidate for Hamilton Centre, Vail, both opposed the project. Smith's campaign focused on addressing the ward's infrastructure backlog and collaborative decision-making, Daljeet campaigned on waterfront re-development, business attraction, and transit affordability, Tennant's campaign emphasized community safety and tackling the opioid epidemic while Chiarelli emphasized community safety and sustainable development.

Local media indicated that James Unsworth had opted to not campaign for the seat, despite having his name remain on the ballot.

Candidates for the October 22, 2018 Hamilton, Ontario Ward 2 councillor election
Candidate	Popular vote			Expenditures
Candidate	Votes	%	±%	Expenditures
Jason Farr (incumbent)	3,162	46.86%	-19.49%	$22,019.53
Cameron Kroetsch	2,024	29.99%	-	$18,405.00
Diane Chiarelli	430	6.37%	-	$0.00
John Vail	296	4.39%	-1.68%	$8,315.57
Mark Tennant	362	5.36%	-	$0.00
Nicole Smith	281	4.16%	-	-^{1}
Suresh Daljeet	120	1.78%	-	-^{1}
James Unsworth	73	1.08%	-	-^{1}
Total votes	6,748			
Registered voters	19,008	35.5%	+6.43%	
^{1} These candidates did not submit official financial statements and were, therefore, ineligible to run in the 2022 election. Note: All Hamilton municipal elections are officially non-partisan. Note: Candidate campaign colours are based on the prominent colour used in campaign items (signs, literature, etc.) and are used as a visual differentiation between candidates.
Sources: City of Hamilton, "Nominated Candidates"

=== Ward 3 ===
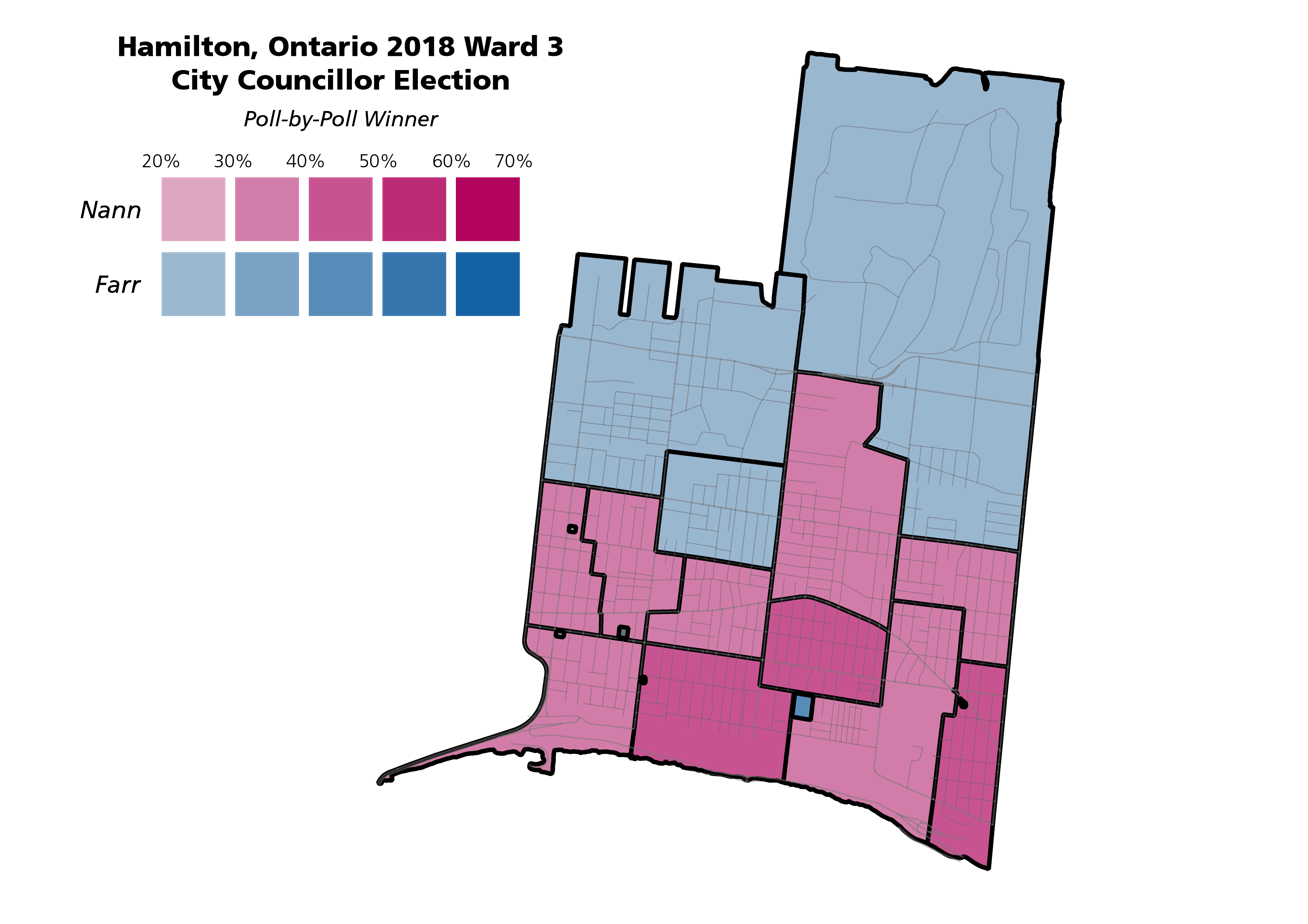
The poll-by-poll results for the Hamilton, Ontario Ward 3 city councillor election in 2018

On June 17, 2018, Hamilton Spectator columnist Andrew Dreschel reported that sitting Ward 3 councillor Matthew Green was considering seeking the NDP nomination to stand as the party's candidate in Hamilton Centre for the 2019 federal election. At the time, Green declined to confirm if he was going to seek federal office or reoffer for his Ward 3 council seat.

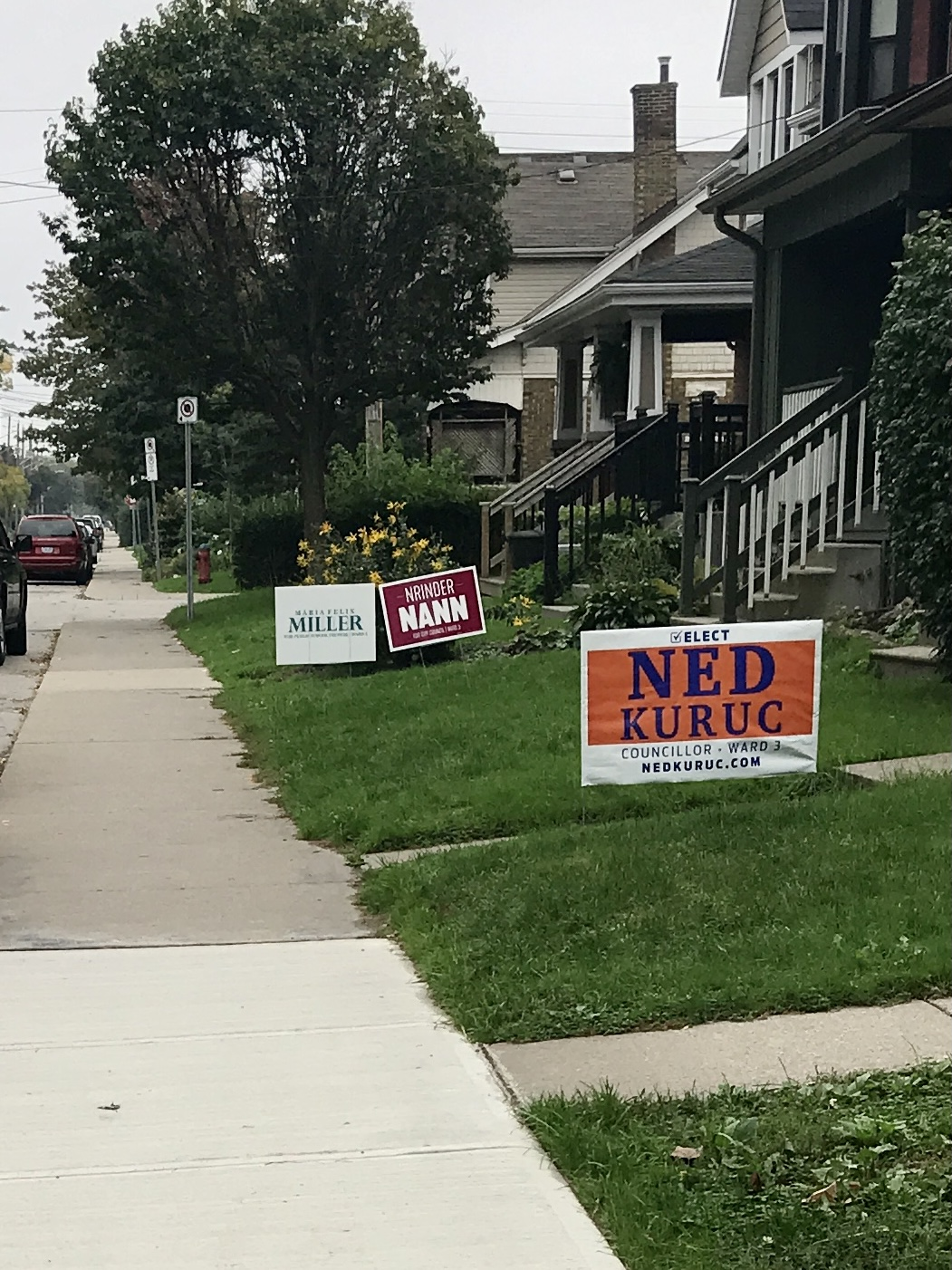
Election lawn signs in Hamilton's St. Claire neighbourhood in October, 2018

Local transgender advocate Kristeen Sprague filed to seek the Ward 3 seat on June 15. Perennial candidate Keith Beck registered to run in Ward 3 on July 6. Beck sought the office of Ward 7 councillor in 2014, receiving 12.41% of the vote. He had filed to papers to run for council in Ward 2 in 2010, but withdrew and refiled to run in Ward 7, and finished last with 5.14% of the vote. In 2006, he filed to run for mayor, but withdrew and refiled to run for city council in Ward 10, where he finished last with 6.58% of the vote. During a 2004 by-election for the office of Ward 2 councillor caused by Andrea Horwath's election to the Ontario legislature, received 29 votes, or 0.57%, placing 9th out of 11 candidates.

The candidates were joined by former staffer with Mayor Fred Eisenberger, Laura Farr, on July 12. Farr, a Liberal Party activist, served on the party's Electoral District Association in Hamilton Centre.

On July 16, one day before incumbent councillor Matthew Green was scheduled to hold a press conference regarding his political future, NDP supporter and founder of a local consulting firm, the Empower Strategy group, Evelyn Myrie registered to run in Ward 3. Myrie had previously been involved with the Hamilton Centre for Civic Inclusion, was awarded with Queen Elizabeth II Diamond Jubilee medal, and has been inducted into Hamilton's Gallery of Distinction. In 1994, Myrie ran for the office of Ward 1 councillor, and finished 5th with 13.6% of the vote. Myrie would later drop out of the race before the close of nominations.

At a press conference held on July 17, Green formally announced that he would not seek re-election in Ward 3, instead opting to seek the NDP's nomination for Parliament in Hamilton Centre.

On the day Green announced his intention to seek higher office, business owner and vocal anti-LRT activist Milena Balta registered to seek the seat.

Following Green's announcement, a number of candidates entered the race to replace the one-term councillor. Alain Bureau, who had successfully advocated for the inclusion of a Gage Park stop on the B-Line LRT route ran on a platform of promoting healthy communities.

Steven Paul Denault, who ran for the office of Ward 3 HWDSB Trustee in 2010 and 2014 and Wards 9, 10, and 11 HWCDSB Trustee in 2006, campaigned on re-establishing a network of electrified trolley buses while expressing frustration with the lack of a public referendum on LRT. Speaking with the CBC, Denault remarked, "I'm very very disappointed in our elected people."

Nrinder Nann, Green's 2014 campaign manager and a local small business owner, ran on a pro-LRT platform that called for strategies to improve housing affordability, improving community safety, and doing more for the environment.

Candidates for the October 22, 2018 Hamilton, Ontario Ward 3 councillor election
Candidate	Popular vote			Expenditures
Candidate	Votes	%	±%	Expenditures
Nrinder Nann	2,618	33.96%	-	$20,787.33
Laura Farr	1,471	19.08%	-	$6,743.99
Ned Kuruc	1,066	13.83%	-	$19,115.22
Amanda Salonen	552	7.16%	-	-^{1}
Dan Smith	474	6.15%	-	$5,566.82
Alain Bureau	314	4.07%	-	$9,959.77 ^{2}
Milena Balta	269	3.49%	-	$4,880.45
Stephen Rowe	232	3.01%	-	$1,620.95
Brendan Kavanaugh	213	2.76%	-	-^{1}
Tony Lemma	196	2.54%	-	$3,965.36
Kristeen Sprague	120	1.56%	-	-^{1}
Steven Paul Denault	100	1.30%	-	$1,659.00
Keith Beck	83	1.08%	-	$0
Total votes	7,708			
Registered voters	24,626	31.3%	+1.71%	
^{1} These candidates did not submit official financial statements and were, therefore, ineligible to run in the 2022 election.^{2} These candidates were delayed in submitting their official financial statements and have been barred from running in the 2022 municipal election. Note: All Hamilton municipal elections are officially non-partisan. Note: Candidate campaign colours are based on the prominent colour used in campaign items (signs, literature, etc.) and are used as a visual differentiation between candidates.
Sources: City of Hamilton, "Nominated Candidates"

=== Ward 4 ===
Ward 4 faced a series of health and environmental issues in the lead-up to the 2018 election. Local media reported of resident complaints regarding a municipal facility storing waste generated from the city's "Green Bin" composting program, odors and particulate from the area's steel plants and metal recycling facility, and on-going issues with Burlington Street, which acts as an arterial highway for heavy trucks. Issues relating to housing affordability and commercial decline were also of importance.

Controversial incumbent councillor Sam Merulla registered to seek a 6th term. Merulla, a former Liberal Party staffer-turned New Democrat, had been experiencing a rightward ideological shift and campaigned on opposing wasteful spending and focusing on "needs rather than wants". Merulla had generated attention and controversy during the 2014-2018 term of council for a number of high-profile motions and disputes. Merulla had waged a campaign against the popular mobile game Pokémon Go after "Pokéstops" were found in the city's cemeteries, and had proposed the licensing of house cats. More controversially, Merulla attacked public employees over wages, threatened to sue Vivian Saunders, a local resident focused on campaign finance accountability, over discrepancies in Merulla's 2014 campaign financial records, pushed for sanctions against Ward 12 councillor Lloyd Ferguson over an incident where Ferguson pushed local journalist Joey Coleman, and mocked Ward 14 councillor Robert Pasuta for missing some council meetings due to Pasuta's suffering a traumatic brain injury on his farm.

Rod Douglas was Merulla's only opponent in the race, Douglas, a 55-year-old mechanical engineer, was an LRT opponent and ran on a campaign of fixing local roads and improving apartment inspection.

Candidates for the October 22, 2018 Hamilton, Ontario Ward 4 councillor election
Candidate	Popular vote			Expenditures
Candidate	Votes	%	±%	Expenditures
Sam Merulla (incumbent)	6,913	78.35%	-4.14%	$26,423.12
Rod Douglas	1,910	21.65%	-	$1,256.75
Total votes	8,823			
Registered voters	24,994	35.3%	+5.43%	
^{1} These candidates did not submit official financial statements and were, therefore, ineligible to run in the 2022 municipal election. Note: All Hamilton municipal elections are officially non-partisan. Note: Candidate campaign colours are based on the prominent colour used in campaign items (signs, literature, etc.) and are used as a visual differentiation between candidates.
Sources: City of Hamilton, "Nominated Candidates"

=== Ward 5 ===
In March, 2018, Stewart Klazinga a resident of the Vincent Neighbourhood, announced his intention to seek the office of Ward 5 councillor. In his announcement, Klazinga spoke of the need to improve transit, transparency, and work toward a Vision Zero program for Hamilton. Klazinga, a 35-year-old community activist, also emphasized the need for more community consultation from councillors.

Former NDP candidate in Ancaster—Dundas—Flamborough—Westdale, Juanita Maldonado, campaigned on opposing LRT, creating an "advocacy office" for seniors and better regulation of cannabis dispensaries. Seven-term incumbent Chad Collins sought another term in office, running on his record of service and focusing on addressing infrastructure issues.

Candidates for the October 22, 2018 Hamilton, Ontario Ward 5 councillor election
Candidate	Popular vote			Expenditures
Candidate	Votes	%	±%	Expenditures
Chad Collins (incumbent)	7,596	80.38%	+8.70	$12,016.03
Juanita Maldonado	1,340	14.16%	-	$1,450.00
Stewart Klazinga	526	5.56%	-	$1,724.35
Total votes	9,462			
Registered voters	26,881	35.2%	+1.56%	
^{1} These candidates did not submit official financial statements and were, therefore, ineligible to run in the 2022 municipal election. Note: All Hamilton municipal elections are officially non-partisan. Note: Candidate campaign colours are based on the prominent colour used in campaign items (signs, literature, etc.) and are used as a visual differentiation between candidates.
Sources: City of Hamilton, "Nominated Candidates"

=== Ward 6 ===
Tom Jackson, who has served as Ward 6 Councillor from 1988, announced his intention to seek re-election immediately following the 2014 election. In January 2018, he confirmed his intention to seek a 10th term on council and registered on June 21.

Brad Young was first to candidate to register on June 8. His campaign focused on a change in leadership, with the candidate writing in the Hamilton Mountain News, “After 30 years of honourable service, isn't it time to nurture the new era?” Young took a stand against the city's LRT project, instead advocating for a conversion of the city's HSR bus fleet to electric vehicles.

Timothy Taylor, the financial officer for a local escape room, ran on a platform of reducing inefficiency at city hall, supporting LRT, providing more supports to local businesses, and reopening the city's disused ski hills.

Candidates for the October 22, 2018 Hamilton, Ontario Ward 6 councillor election
Candidate	Popular vote			Expenditures
Candidate	Votes	%	±%	Expenditures
Tom Jackson (incumbent)	8,247	82.26%	+1.43	$27,470.75
Timothy Taylor	943	9.41%	-	$0.00
Brad Young	836	8.34%	-	$446.95
Total votes	10,026			
Registered voters	25,318	39.6%	+4.45%	
^{1} These candidates did not submit official financial statements and were, therefore, ineligible to run in the 2022 municipal election. Note: All Hamilton municipal elections are officially non-partisan. Note: Candidate campaign colours are based on the prominent colour used in campaign items (signs, literature, etc.) and are used as a visual differentiation between candidates.
Sources: City of Hamilton, "Nominated Candidates"

=== Ward 7 ===
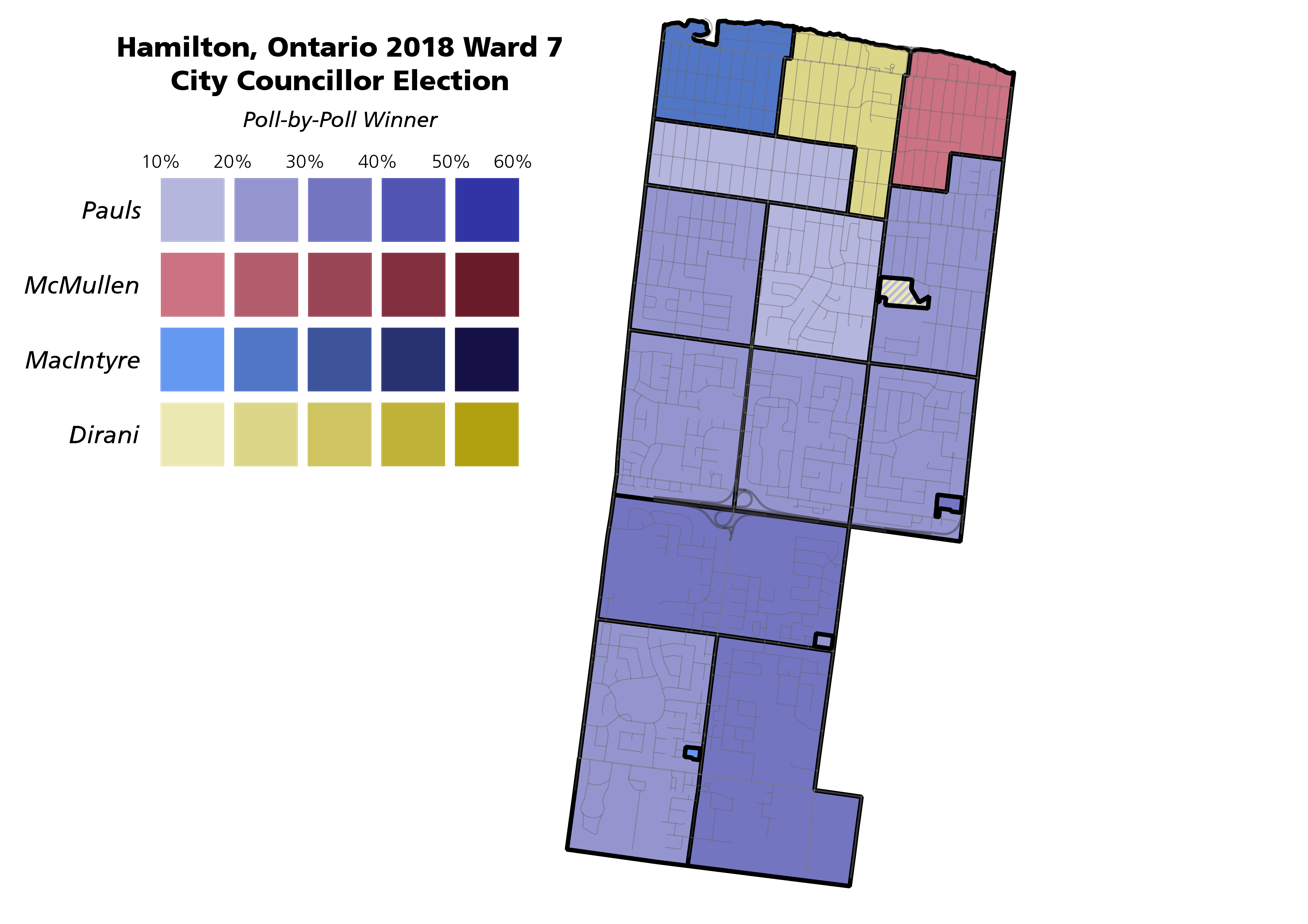
The poll-by-poll results for the Hamilton, Ontario Ward 7 city councillor election in 2018

Ward 7, despite the ward-boundary realignment, remained the largest ward in the city by population at 47,460 residents. The ward had faced considerable political upheaval with former councillor Scott Duvall vacating the seat in 2015 after being elected Hamilton Mountain's NDP MP and the winner of the by-election to replace him, Donna Skelly, vacating the seat in early 2018 after being elected the PC MPP for Flamborough-Glanbrook. Former Ward 7 alderman Terry Anderson, who served from 1991 to 2000, served as the interim councillor, but did not seek election to the seat.

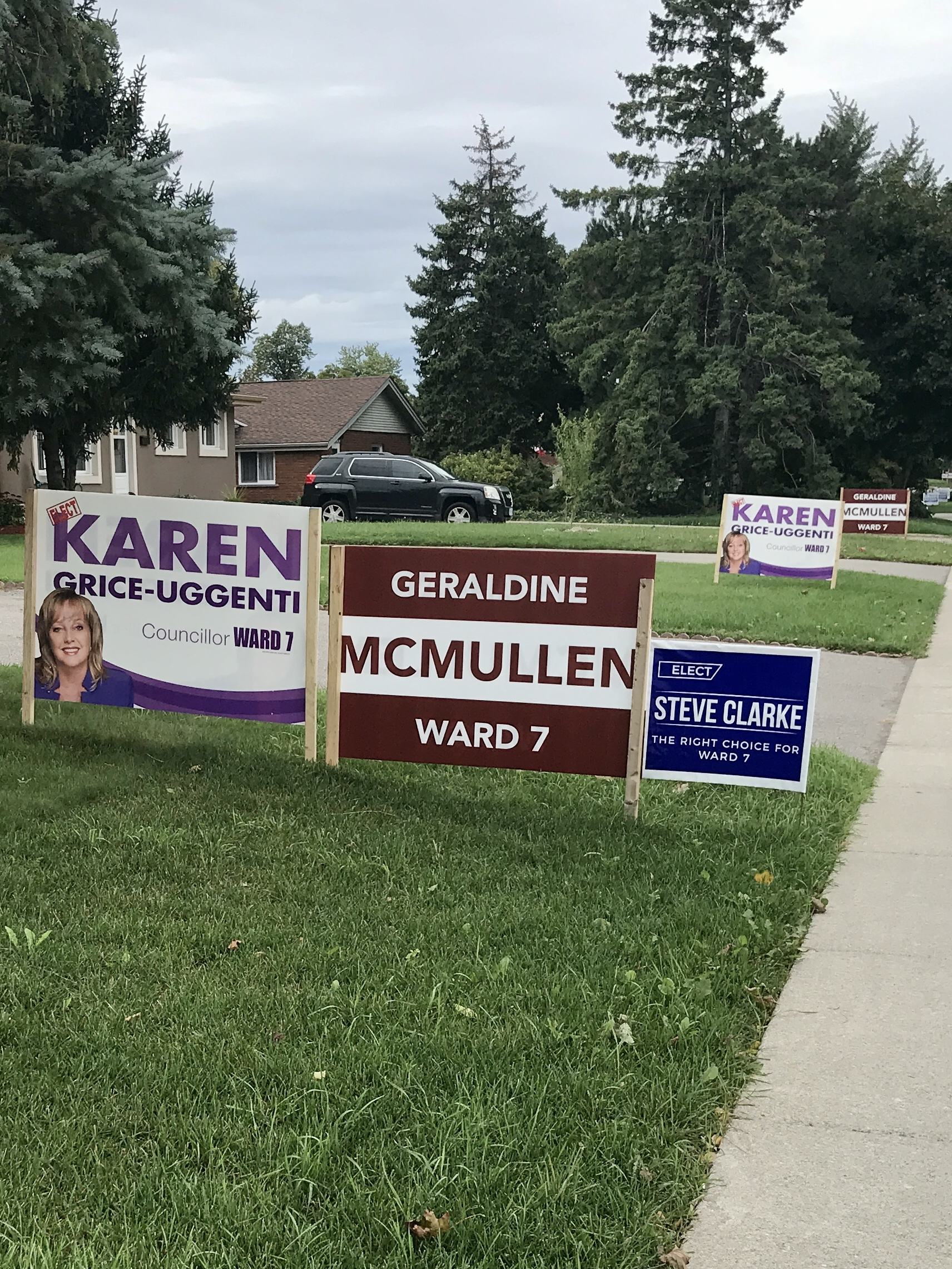
Election lawn signs in Hamilton's Bruleville neighbourhood in October, 2018

Ester Pauls, the runner-up in race for Hamilton Mountain MPP in the June 2018 Ontario general election registered to seek the seat. Pauls, the owner of a running shop in Westdale, was skeptical of the city's LRT project and ran on a platform of being a political outsider. Despite her contemporary political affiliations, Pauls also noted her past campaign work for former Hamilton Mountain MPP Marie Bountrogianni and former Mayor Bob Bratina.

Geraldine McMullen, a candidate in the by-election to replace Duvall, worked with the Ontario NDP and campaigned on speaking up for the ward's residents, public operation of LRT, supporting affordable housing in the ward, and running for re-election in 2022 rather than seeking outside opportunities as the ward's former councillors had. McMullen also carried the endorsement of former Hamilton Mountain MP Chris Charlton.

Dan McIntyre, a 29-year old autoworker, ran on a platform of supporting LRT, addressing poverty through job creation, and increasing HSR service. McIntyre was one of the few candidates to list a home address in the ward at the time of the election. Adam Dirani, an opponent of LRT, ran on a fiscally conservative platform of being more efficient with the city's taxes, while Steve Clarke, a semi-retired City of Hamilton employee, wanted the city to focus on building the A-Line LRT first. Karen Grice-Uggenti, the director of the Hamilton Mountain Liberal Party Association, wanted a pivot to BRT, and Steven Benson, a self-employed advertising executive, was undecided about LRT, instead focusing his platform on traffic calming. Jim McColl, a USW steelworker, ran on a platform of supporting LRT, expanding the B.L.A.S.T network and clean, safe, affordable housing.

On election night, Pauls won with the smallest percentage of any elected councillor, earning 25% of the vote and beating McMullen by just over 1,100 votes. Pauls attributed her victory to her attempts to connect with the voters of Ward 7.

Candidates for the October 22, 2018 Hamilton, Ontario Ward 7 councillor election
Candidate	Popular vote			Expenditures
Candidate	Votes	%	±%	Expenditures
Esther Pauls	3,016	25.00%	-	$11,909.48
Geraldine McMullen	1,878	15.57%	+8.4% Note 1	$15,870.80
Dan MacIntyre	1,735	14.38%	-	$21,162.08
Adam Dirani	1,418	11.75%	-	$9,230.00
Karen Grice-Uggenti	1,280	10.61%	-	$14,191.78
Steve Clarke	1,243	10.30%	-	$1,620.96
Jim McColl	662	5.49%	-	$5,129.33
Steve Benson	411	3.41%	-	-^{1}
Joseph Kazubek	160	1.33%	-	$1,360.65
Roland Schneider	157	1.30%	-	$3,452.32
Kristopher Clowater	104	0.86%	-	$4,481.92
Total votes	12,064			
Registered voters	31,093	38.8%	+7.05%	
^{1} These candidates did not submit official financial statements and were, therefore, ineligible to run in the 2022 election. Note 1: Results compared to 2016 by-election. Note: All Hamilton municipal elections are officially non-partisan. Note: Candidate campaign colours are based on the prominent colour used in campaign items (signs, literature, etc.) and are used as a visual differentiation between candidates.
Sources: City of Hamilton, "Nominated Candidates"

=== Ward 8 ===
Christopher Climie, a local real estate agent, was the first candidate to register on May 8, 2018. Despite Climie's early entry into the race, he made no effort to campaign, not responding to any questions from local media, maintaining any campaign website or infrastructure, or appearing at any debates.

John-Paul Danko, runner up in the 2016 Ward 7 by-election, registered to run in Ward 8 on May 11, 2018. Danko, the husband of Ward 7 Public School Trustee Dawn Danko, began to publicly campaign for an appointment to city council after the winner of the 2016 by-election, Donna Skelly, was elected Progressive Conservative MPP for Flamborough—Glanbrook.

Colleen Wicken registered to seek the seat on June 28, 2018. Wicken, a staffer with Ward 8 Councillor Terry Whitehead and former chair of the Bonnington-Buchanan-Mohawk-Southam Neighbourhoods Association, had previously advocated for more police presence in student neighbourhoods and against the city's ward boundary changes. Danko ran on a platform of supporting the city's LRT project, reducing speeds on local streets, investing in infrastructure, and planning for intensification along Upper James Street.

On the final day of registrations, former Mississauga City Councillor and MP for Mississauga-Brampton South, Eve Adams, registered to seek the Ward 8 seat. Adams, who was elected as a Conservative in 2011 and crossed the floor to the Liberals prior to the 2015 election before losing a nomination battle to Marco Mendicino in the Toronto-area riding of Eglinton-Lawrence, had served on Mississauga City Council representing Ward 5 from 2003 to her election to Parliament in 2011. Adams, who has family in Hamilton, noted that she wanted to widen the Red Hill Valley Expressway and the 403, cancel the city's LRT project, and attract more businesses to Hamilton.

During the campaign, Ward 8 councillor Terry Whitehead, who was seeking election in Ward 14, mass-emailed constituents, accusing Wicken of stealing a contact list meant for Christmas cards for personal political gain and encouraging residents to report Wicken to the police. Wicken denied the accusation. Whitehead, who had endorsed Ruddick, requested that the Hamilton Police open an investigation into the matter.

Candidates for the October 22, 2018 Hamilton, Ontario Ward 8 councillor election
Candidate	Popular vote			Expenditures
Candidate	Votes	%	±%	Expenditures
John-Paul Danko	3,752	41.67%	+23% Note 1	$25,906.54
Eve Adams	2,097	23.29%	-	$19,800.00
Steve Ruddick	1,905	21.16%	-	$7,988.23
Colleen Wicken	911	10.12%	-	$9,872.08
Anthony Simpson	288	3.20%	-	-^{1}
Christopher Climie	50	0.56%	-	-^{1}
Total votes	9,003			
Registered voters	21,694	41.5%	+5.21%	
^{1} These candidates did not submit official financial statements and were, therefore, ineligible to run in the 2022 election. Note 1: Results compared to 2016 by-election. Note: All Hamilton municipal elections are officially non-partisan. Note: Candidate campaign colours are based on the prominent colour used in campaign items (signs, literature, etc.) and are used as a visual differentiation between candidates.
Sources: City of Hamilton, "Nominated Candidates"

=== Ward 9 ===
Incumbent councillor Doug Conley informed the Stoney Creek News of his intention to seek re-election in January 2018, registering to run on May 16.

Cam Galindo, third-place Ward 9 candidate in 2014, announced he would be seeking the seat for a second time in February 2018. At his campaign launch on June 16, Galindo spoke about the need for lower taxes, more public forums, increased public safety, and improvement of local parks, while speaking skeptically about the city's LRT project. Galindo dropped out of the councillor's race on the final day of nominations, re-registering to seek a school trustee seat instead.

The day before nominations were set to close, former Ward 9 councillor, 2014 mayoral candidate, Stoney Creek Progressive Conservative MPP, and provincial cabinet minister Brad Clark registered to seek the seat. Since his defeat to Mayor Eisenberger in 2014, Clark has been a consultant with Maple Leaf Strategies, a group representing a landfill in upper Stoney Creek. After registering, Clark spoke about his track-record of never having an Ontario Municipal Board tribunal surrounding a development project in his ward during his two terms in office.

Local resident David Ford registered to seek the seat to tackle what he claimed were communication issues with incumbent councillor Conley. Ford, an HR manager, informed the Stoney Creek News that he opposed LRT and supported widening roads in the area, while noting "I hate politics, so maybe this is the right job for me."

Lakhwinder Singh Multani, a second-place finisher in the Ward 5 council race in 2000, also campaigned on better communication and opposing LRT, while also promoting the idea of making police more visible throughout the area.

Peter Lanza, a first-time candidate for office, echoed his fellow candidates' concerns about communication, while campaigning on the need to improve the area's infrastructure to keep pace with a growing population.

Candidates for the October 22, 2018 Hamilton, Ontario Ward 9 councillor election
Candidate	Popular vote			Expenditures
Candidate	Votes	%	±%	Expenditures
Brad Clark	2,539	38.73%	-	$17,516.77
Doug Conley (incumbent)	1,961	29.91%	+3.74	-^{1}
Peter Lanza	1,529	23.32%	-	$6,574.43
David Ford	330	5.03%	-	-^{1}
Lakhwinder Singh Multani	197	3.00%	-	-^{1}
Total votes	6,556			
Registered voters	19,114	34.3%	+0.1%	
^{1} These candidates did not submit official financial statements and were, therefore, ineligible to run in the 2022 election. Note: All Hamilton municipal elections are officially non-partisan. Note: Candidate campaign colours are based on the prominent colour used in campaign items (signs, literature, etc.) and are used as a visual differentiation between candidates.
Sources: City of Hamilton, "Nominated Candidates"

=== Ward 10 ===
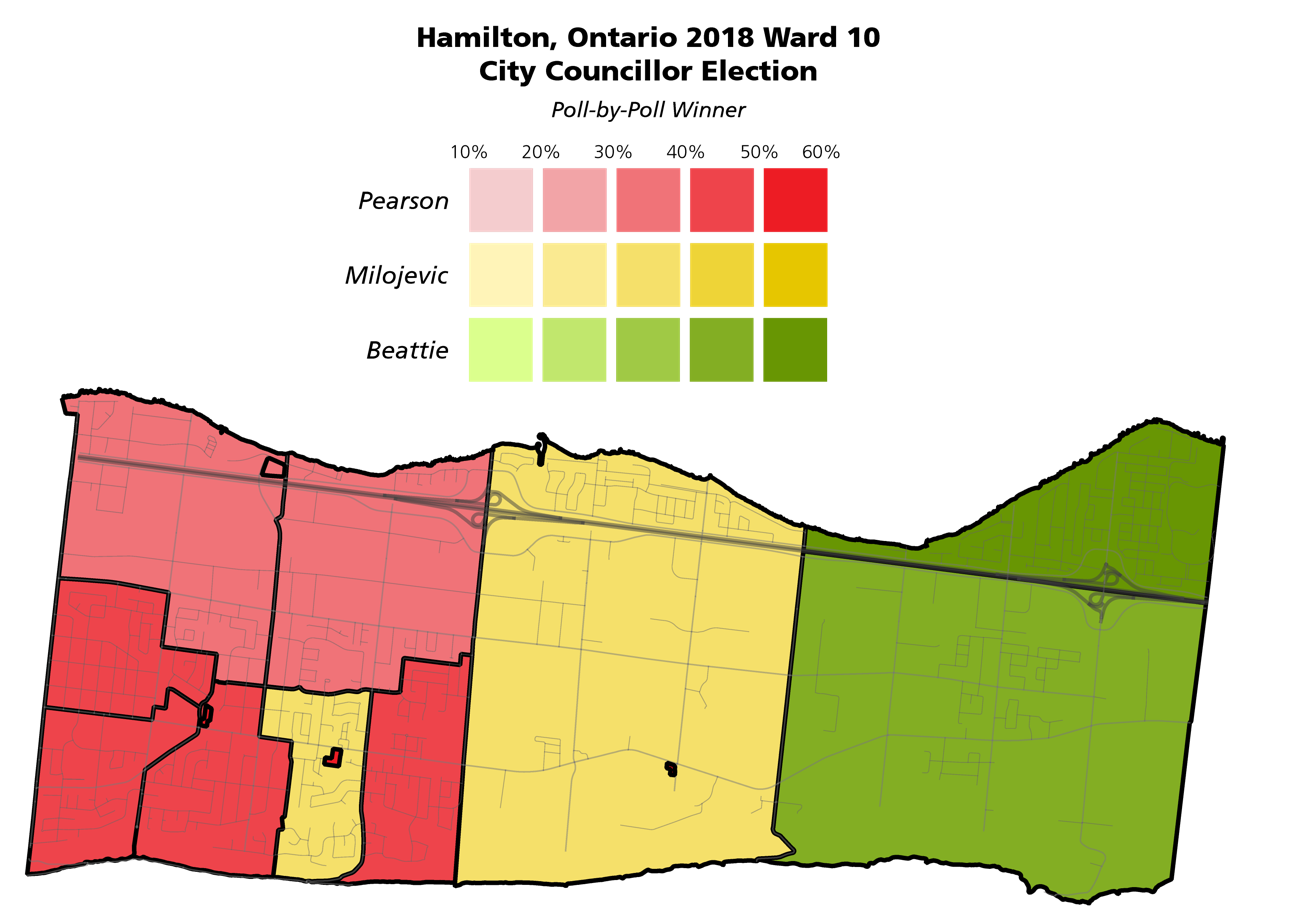
The poll-by-poll results for the Hamilton, Ontario Ward 10 city councillor election in 2018.

Ian Thompson, Ward 13 HWDSB Trustee (2000–2003), Ward 11 and 12 HWDSB Trustee (2003–2006), and a former staffer with Liberal MPPs Dominic Agostino and Judy Marsales, was the first individual to announce their intention to seek office in the 2018 election. Prior to the Ontario Municipal Board's decision on the city's ward boundaries, Thompson had considered seeking election in the former Ward 11, though the redistribution shifted his attention to Ward 10, where he resides. At his campaign launch, Thompson announced he would, if elected, ask the mayor to address power outage issues in Stoney Creek, hire 30 new police officers to combat crime, build a splash-pad in the Oceanic neighbourhood, and only serve two terms.

In March 2018, one-term Ward 9 and 10 HWDSB Trustee Jeff Beattie announced that he was considering seeking a seat on council. Beattie registered to run for city council on the day nominations opened, May 1. At his campaign launch and meet and greet, Beattie listed community safety, transit, infrastructure and improving city services among his priorities. Beattie, citing his long residency in the area, believed this provided his campaign with an advantage.

Maria Pearson, councillor for Ward 10 since 2003 and councillor in the former Town of Stoney Creek from 1991 to 2000, registered to run for a fourth term on May 4. Pearson labelled herself an LRT critic and has campaigned for a BRT-style alternative to the rapid transit project.

Louie Milojevic, a local private equity investor, history professor and columnist, sought the council seat after placing third to Pearson in the 2003 election. Milojevic spoke about the need for better transit in the area, campaigned for improved infrastructure, and opposed the city's LRT project.

Candidates for the October 22, 2018 Hamilton, Ontario Ward 10 councillor election
Candidate	Popular vote			Expenditures
Candidate	Votes	%	±%	Expenditures
Maria Pearson (incumbent)	3,988	36.34%	-21.69%	$23,895.59
Louie Milojevic	2,990	27.25%	-	$19,148.68
Jeff Beattie	2,692	24.53%	-	$13,957.90
Ian Thompson	1,304	11.88%	-	$12,294.42
Total votes	11,045			
Registered voters	27,005	40.88%	+0.02%	
^{1} These candidates did not submit official financial statements and were, therefore, ineligible to run in the 2022 municipal election. Note: All Hamilton municipal elections are officially non-partisan. Note: Candidate campaign colours are based on the prominent colour used in campaign items (signs, literature, etc.) and are used as a visual differentiation between candidates.
Sources: City of Hamilton, "Nominated Candidates"

=== Ward 11 ===
Brenda Johnson, two-term Ward 11 councillor, announced her intention to seek another term on council in September 2017 when former HWDSB Trustee Ian Thompson indicated he would be running for the office as well. Following ward boundary re-alignments, Thompson sought election in Ward 10.

Candidates for the October 22, 2018 Hamilton, Ontario Ward 11 councillor election
Candidate	Popular vote			Expenditures
Candidate	Votes	%	±%	Expenditures
Brenda Johnson (incumbent)	6,129	87.97%	+4.52%	$11,639.15
Waleed Shewayhat	838	12.03%	-	-^{1}
Total votes	7,045			
Registered voters	17,790	39.6%	+5.99%	
^{1} These candidates did not submit official financial statements and were, therefore, ineligible to run in the 2022 election.^{2} These candidates were delayed in submitting their official financial statements and have been barred from running in the 2022 municipal election. Note: All Hamilton municipal elections are officially non-partisan. Note: Candidate campaign colours are based on the prominent colour used in campaign items (signs, literature, etc.) and are used as a visual differentiation between candidates.
Sources: City of Hamilton, "Nominated Candidates"

=== Ward 12 ===
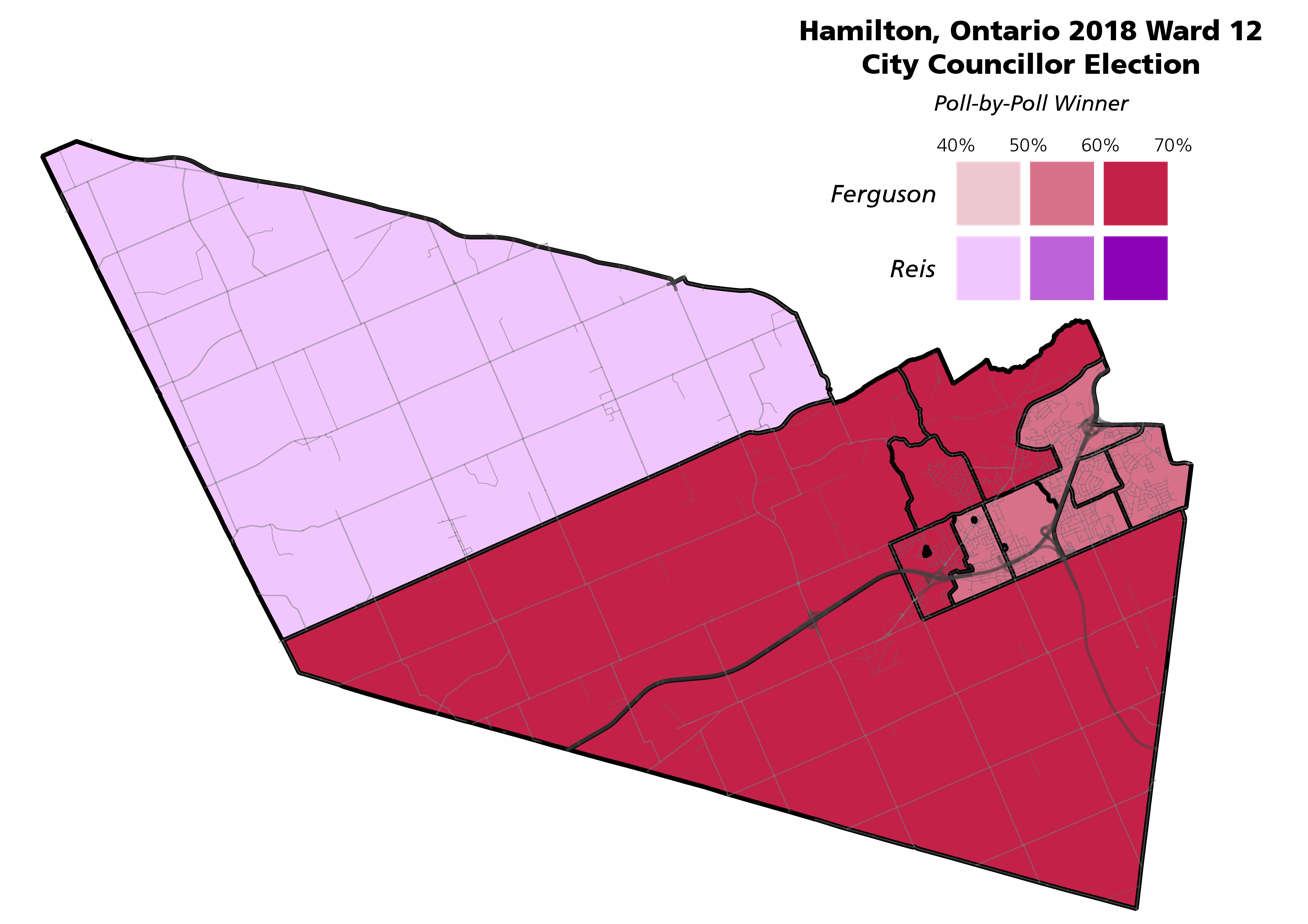
The poll-by-poll results for the Hamilton, Ontario Ward 12 city councillor election in 2018

The first candidate to register for the Ward 12 council position was Ancaster resident and loss prevention manager, John Scime. Scime focused on public safety, managing the area's growth, and supporting increased bus service to the John C. Munro Hamilton International Airport.

Scime's nomination was matched the following day by Sheffield resident Miranda Reis. A disability-rights advocate and chartered accountant who served as the former budget manager for the City of Cambridge, Ries pointed to improved public transit as being crucial for the city's development.

The third entrant to the Ward 12 council race was Ancaster resident and third-place finisher in the 2014 race for Ward 11 and 12 Public School Trustee, Mike Bell. Bell, a mechanical engineer, indicated he wanted to make Ancaster more walkable, adding bike lanes onto area streets, and carefully reviewing the city's LRT project and a $13-million water tower project approved by the city in 2017.

Lloyd Ferguson, the incumbent Ward 12 councillor, had avoided making any commitment to running for a 4th term, telling the Ancaster News that anyone who makes known their ambitions to seek political office, would "'put a big target on' their back." Ferguson registered to run on July 9, 2018. Speaking with the Ancaster News, Ferguson indicated that he had wavered on whether he would seek re-election, but ultimately decided to register again to complete pending projects in his community, though he noted he would likely not run again in the 2022 election.

The final candidate to register was 27-year-old real estate agent Kevin Marley. A graduate of McMaster University, Marley indicated he was supportive of the city's LRT project, wanted to investigate public works efforts for low-income citizens, and improving the area's highway infrastructure to ease congestion.

Candidates for the October 22, 2018 Hamilton, Ontario Ward 12 councillor election
Candidate	Popular vote			Expenditures
Candidate	Votes	%	±%	Expenditures
Lloyd Ferguson (incumbent)	7,000	58.30%	-20.45%	$22,165.97
Miranda Reis	2,296	19.12%	-	$12,593.74
Mike Bell	1,699	14.15%	-	$9,367.27
John Scime	801	6.67%	-	$1,804.32
Kevin Marley	210	1.75%	-	$402.56
Total votes	12,006			
Registered voters				
Total votes	12,006			
Registered voters	29,426	40.8%	+4.9%	
^{1} These candidates did not submit official financial statements and were, therefore, ineligible to run in the 2022 municipal election. Note: All Hamilton municipal elections are officially non-partisan. Note: Candidate campaign colours are based on the prominent colour used in campaign items (signs, literature, etc.) and are used as a visual differentiation between candidates.
Sources: City of Hamilton, "Nominated Candidates"

=== Ward 13 ===
Two candidates registered to seek the Ward 13 council seat on the first day of nominations: small business owner and prospective Hamilton West-Ancaster-Dundas Progressive Conservative nomination contestant Kevin Gray, as well as John Mykytyshyn, a local Conservative activist and son of a former Dundas town councillor. Gray emphasized the importance of increasing communication between Dundas and Hamilton, while Mykytyshyn discussed returning to wards for Dundas and Flamborough realigning these wards to the former ward boundaries

The third candidate to register was local teacher Rich Gelder, who filed on June 11. Gelder, a Dundas resident for two decades, supported the city's LRT project, and promoted the idea of complete streets, better public transit, and improved cycling infrastructure.

Candidates for the October 22, 2018 Hamilton, Ontario Ward 13 councillor election
Candidate	Popular vote			Expenditures
Candidate	Votes	%	±%	Expenditures
Arlene Vanderbeek (incumbent)	3,953	34.49%	-8.07%	$18,974.83
Rich Gelder	3,087	26.93%	-	$8,075.08
John Mykytyshyn	2,091	18.24%	-	$23,778.40 ^{2}
Kevin Gray	895	7.81%	-	-^{1}
John Roberts	661	5.77%	-	-^{1}
Gaspare Bonomo	598	5.22%	-	$4,269.34
Pamela Mitchell	177	1.54%	+0.53%	$0.10
Total votes	11,462			
Registered voters	26,289	40.8%	-0.19%	
^{1} These candidates did not submit official financial statements and were, therefore, ineligible to run in the 2022 election.^{2} These candidates were delayed in submitting their official financial statements and have been barred from running in the 2022 municipal election. Note: All Hamilton municipal elections are officially non-partisan. Note: Candidate campaign colours are based on the prominent colour used in campaign items (signs, literature, etc.) and are used as a visual differentiation between candidates.
Sources: City of Hamilton, "Nominated Candidates"

=== Ward 14 ===
The first candidate to register for the Ward 14 council seat was 2015 Hamilton West-Ancaster-Dundas federal Conservative Party candidate and 2018 provincial Progressive Conservative nomination contestant Vincent Samuel, who registered on June 12. Samuel, who immigrated to Canada from Pakistan in 1990, expressed a desire to keep taxes low and ensure a variety of housing options for Mountain residents. Samuel indicated he wanted to ensure the city's LRT project was beneficial to taxpayers.

Terry Whitehead, who had served as Ward 8 councillor from 2003, avoided declaring which seat he would contest after his West Mountain ward was split following the OMB decision on the city's ward boundaries, waiting until July 26 to register. In March 2018, he announced he was considering a challenge to incumbent mayor Fred Eisenberger, though ultimately opted to run for a fourth term on council.

Robert Iszkula, a small-business owner who formerly lived on the west mountain, ran on a campaign of improving HSR service, adding a public library to the ward, and improving local parks. Roslyn French-Sanges, a stylist with clothing company Nygard, promised to be more responsive to constituents and improve transportation in the ward. Bryan Wilson, a 38-year-old employee with Air Canada, campaigned on supporting LRT, improving local green space, and better maintaining roads.

During the election, Whitehead came under fire from LIUNA after the union donated $500.00 to his campaign based on his comments indicating he was supporting LRT. Whitehead reversed his position, prompting a vice-president in the union, Joe Mancinelli, to say he felt "disappointed and betrayed."

In the final weeks of the campaign, both Iszkula and Samuel suspended their campaigns. Iszkula endorsed Wilson, while Samuel announced he would be supporting Whitehead. As the deadline for removing their names from the ballot had passed, both candidates formally remained in the race.

Candidates for the October 22, 2018 Hamilton, Ontario Ward 14 councillor election
Candidate	Popular vote			Expenditures
Candidate	Votes	%	±%	Expenditures
Terry Whitehead (incumbent)	5,358	57.79%	-18.75%	$27,849.35
Bryan Wilson	2,535	27.34%	-	$4,432.86
Roslyn French-Sanges	834	9.00%	-	$10,225.00
Robert Iszkula	295	3.18%	-	$3,226.79
Vincent Samuel	249	2.69%	-	$0.00
Total votes	9,271			
Registered voters	22,179	41.8%	New ward	
^{1} These candidates did not submit official financial statements and were, therefore, ineligible to run in the 2022 municipal election. Note: All Hamilton municipal elections are officially non-partisan. Note: Candidate campaign colours are based on the prominent colour used in campaign items (signs, literature, etc.) and are used as a visual differentiation between candidates.
Sources: City of Hamilton, "Nominated Candidates"

=== Ward 15 ===
On June 18, incumbent councillor Judi Partridge filed to run for re-election. Having unsuccessfully run for the Ontario Liberal Party during the 2018 Ontario Election in the riding of Flamborough-Glanbrook, Partridge opted to seek another term on council to continue the projects she began prior to her provincial run.

Candidates for the October 22, 2018 Hamilton, Ontario Ward 15 councillor election
Candidate	Popular vote			Expenditures
Candidate	Votes	%	±%	Expenditures
Judi Partridge (incumbent)	3,471	51.61%	-17.62%	$17,654.85
Susan McKechnie	3,255	48.39%	-	$9,554.91
Total votes	6,726			
Registered voters				
Total votes	6,726			
Registered voters	20,382	33%	+5.12%	
^{1} These candidates did not submit official financial statements and were, therefore, ineligible to run in the 2022 municipal election. Note: All Hamilton municipal elections are officially non-partisan. Note: Candidate campaign colours are based on the prominent colour used in campaign items (signs, literature, etc.) and are used as a visual differentiation between candidates.
Sources: City of Hamilton, "Nominated Candidates"

== Public school board trustee elections ==
=== Ward 1 and 2 ===
Candidates for the October 22, 2018 Hamilton-Wentworth District School Board Ward 1 and 2 trustee election
Candidate	Popular vote			Expenditures
Candidate	Votes	%	±%	Expenditures
Christine Bingham (incumbent)	8,404	75.96%	+45.21%	$462.54
Rahimuddin Chowdhury	2,660	24.04%	-	$0.00
Total votes	11,064			
Registered voters				
Note: All Hamilton municipal elections are officially non-partisan. Note: Candidate campaign colours are based on the prominent colour used in campaign items (signs, literature, etc.) and are used as a visual differentiation between candidates.
Sources: City of Hamilton, "Nominated School Trustee Candidates" Archived May 4, 2018, at the Wayback Machine

=== Ward 3 ===
Candidates for the October 22, 2018 Hamilton-Wentworth District School Board Ward 3 trustee election
Candidate	Popular vote			Expenditures
Candidate	Votes	%	±%	Expenditures
Chris Parkinson	1,461	27.03%	-	$1,035.32
Maria Felix Miller	1,432	26.49%	-	$1,047.21
Gail Tessier	824	15.25%	-	$625.81
Jocelynn Vieira	788	14.58%	-	$402.19
Livia Jones	568	10.51%	-	$339.47
Marlene Thomas	332	6.14%	-	$0.00
Total votes	5,405			
Registered voters				
Note: All Hamilton municipal elections are officially non-partisan. Note: Candidate campaign colours are based on the prominent colour used in campaign items (signs, literature, etc.) and are used as a visual differentiation between candidates.
Sources: City of Hamilton, "Nominated School Trustee Candidates" Archived May 4, 2018, at the Wayback Machine

=== Ward 4 ===
Candidates for the October 22, 2018 Hamilton-Wentworth District School Board Ward 4 trustee election
Candidate	Popular vote			Expenditures
Candidate	Votes	%	±%	Expenditures
Ray E. Mulholland (incumbent)	Acclaimed			
Total votes				
Registered voters				
Note: All Hamilton municipal elections are officially non-partisan. Note: Candidate campaign colours are based on the prominent colour used in campaign items (signs, literature, etc.) and are used as a visual differentiation between candidates.
Sources: City of Hamilton, "Nominated School Trustee Candidates" Archived May 4, 2018, at the Wayback Machine

=== Ward 5 ===
Chair of the HWDSB, incumbent Ward 5 trustee Todd White, registered to seek a third term on July 25, 2018. The day following his registration, CBC Hamilton reported that Carole Paikin Miller, the wife of Hamilton East-Stoney Creek MPP Paul Miller would be seeking the seat as well. White, who had served as Miller's constituency assistant since 2007, had filed a complaint with the Human Rights Tribunal of Ontario against the 4-term MPP after Miller critiqued White for taking parental leave to care for his children. In a series of voicemails leaked to the media, Miller slammed White and the Canadian Office and Professional Employees Union, stating "Sometimes unions do more harm than good, and sometimes, they get their people into bad situations." White downplayed the entry of Paikin Miller, telling the CBC, "I think the actions and behaviour are consistent with what has already been reported. I'll let voters conclude what this all means."

On July 26, the Stoney Creek News reported that candidate Jason McLaughlin had, in the past, posted lewd and sexist memes to his personal Facebook page and had been told by outgoing Ward 3 trustee Larry Pattison to address the issue. McLaughlin stated to the paper that one of the memes, which referred to women as 'ugly', did not appear to have offended anyone while another was possibly posted by someone "trying to sabotage his campaign".

The Ward 5 trustee campaign became a proxy battle between different Hamilton-area NDP organizations. Paikin Miller did not interact with local media during the election and did not respond to reporter's comments following her victory. White was blunt when discussing his election loss, blaming his dispute with MPP Miller for his loss and noting, "When you stick your neck out you have to be prepared for it to be cut off and in this case, Paul Miller and the NDP cut it off."

Candidates for the October 22, 2018 Hamilton-Wentworth District School Board Ward 5 trustee election
Candidate	Popular vote			Expenditures
Candidate	Votes	%	±%	Expenditures
Carole Paikin Miller	2,349	40.75%	-	$7,980.58
Todd White (incumbent)	2,240	38.86%	-36.78%	$3,898.69
Jason McLaughlin	1,175	20.39%	-	$0.00
Total votes	5,764			
Registered voters				
Note: All Hamilton municipal elections are officially non-partisan. Note: Candidate campaign colours are based on the prominent colour used in campaign items (signs, literature, etc.) and are used as a visual differentiation between candidates.
Sources: City of Hamilton, "Nominated School Trustee Candidates" Archived May 4, 2018, at the Wayback Machine

=== Ward 6 ===
Candidates for the October 22, 2018 Hamilton-Wentworth District School Board Ward 6 trustee election
Candidate	Popular vote			Expenditures
Candidate	Votes	%	±%	Expenditures
Kathy Archer (incumbent)	3,046	48.43%	+15.06%	$428.02
Jay Edington	2,495	39.67%	-	$6,865.53
Eamon O'Donnell	749	11.91%	-12.66%	-^{1}
Total votes	6,290			
Registered voters				
^{1} These candidates did not submit official financial statements and were, therefore, ineligible to run in the 2022 election. Note: All Hamilton municipal elections are officially non-partisan. Note: Candidate campaign colours are based on the prominent colour used in campaign items (signs, literature, etc.) and are used as a visual differentiation between candidates.
Sources: City of Hamilton, "Nominated School Trustee Candidates" Archived May 4, 2018, at the Wayback Machine

=== Ward 7 ===
Candidates for the October 22, 2018 Hamilton-Wentworth District School Board Ward 7 trustee election
Candidate	Popular vote			Expenditures
Candidate	Votes	%	±%	Expenditures
Dawn Danko (incumbent)	Acclaimed			
Total votes				
Registered voters				
Note: All Hamilton municipal elections are officially non-partisan. Note: Candidate campaign colours are based on the prominent colour used in campaign items (signs, literature, etc.) and are used as a visual differentiation between candidates.
Sources: City of Hamilton, "Nominated School Trustee Candidates" Archived May 4, 2018, at the Wayback Machine

=== Ward 8 and 14 ===
Despite registering to run on May 3, 2018, Wes Hicks, the incumbent 33-year veteran school trustee announced on June 28 that he was stepping down and would withdraw his nomination to seek another term.

Candidates for the October 22, 2018 Hamilton-Wentworth District School Board Ward 8 and 14 trustee election
Candidate	Popular vote			Expenditures
Candidate	Votes	%	±%	Expenditures
Becky Buck	6,866	61.61%	-	$6,257.41
Damin Starr	1,248	11.20%	-	$1,390.87
Rochelle Butler	1,072	9.62%	-	$672.21
Yousaf Malik	1,064	9.55%	-	$1,710.87
Erica Villabroza	894	8.02%	-	$9,703.73
Total votes	11,144			
Registered voters				
Note: All Hamilton municipal elections are officially non-partisan. Note: Candidate campaign colours are based on the prominent colour used in campaign items (signs, literature, etc.) and are used as a visual differentiation between candidates.
Sources: City of Hamilton, "Nominated School Trustee Candidates" Archived May 4, 2018, at the Wayback Machine

=== Ward 9 and 10 ===
In an interview prior to the 2019 Federal Election campaign, former NDP MP for Hamilton East-Stoney Creek from (2006 to 2015), Wayne Marston, indicated he was considering running for a school trustee's position in the 2018 election. Marston had served as a Public School Trustee for Ward 5 from (2000 to 2006).

Candidates for the October 22, 2018 Hamilton-Wentworth District School Board Ward 9 and 10 trustee election
Candidate	Popular vote			Expenditures
Candidate	Votes	%	±%	Expenditures
Cam Galindo	4,894	52.06%	-	$9,874.09
Wayne Marston	4,506	47.94%	-	$5,449.82
Total votes	9,400			
Registered voters				
Note: All Hamilton municipal elections are officially non-partisan. Note: Candidate campaign colours are based on the prominent colour used in campaign items (signs, literature, etc.) and are used as a visual differentiation between candidates.
Sources: City of Hamilton, "Nominated School Trustee Candidates" Archived May 4, 2018, at the Wayback Machine

=== Ward 11 and 12 ===
The first entrant into the Ward 11 and 12 trustee race was young right-wing activist Blake Hambly. Hambly, a graduate of Hamilton District Christian High School, a private Christian school in Glanbrook, is the president of the McMaster Campus Conservatives and the McMaster branch of Turning Point, a right-wing advocacy group founded by Charlie Kirk, that targets youth and university campuses. Hambly worked for Arizona Senate candidate Kelli Ward, Conservative Party of Canada leadership contestant Kellie Leitch, Progressive Conservative Party of Ontario leadership candidate and social conservative, Tanya Granic Allen, and Flamborough-Glanbrook PC MPP Donna Skelly.

Incumbent trustee Alex Johnstone, a staffer with Hamilton Centre MP David Christopherson, registered to run for re-election on June 29.

The final candidate to enter the race was Glanbrook resident Bruce Carnegie. Carnegie, a McMaster chemistry graduate, noted his concerns around dropping EQAO scores and emphasized a focus on STEM education.

Candidates for the October 22, 2018 Hamilton-Wentworth District School Board Ward 11 and 12 trustee election
Candidate	Popular vote			Expenditures
Candidate	Votes	%	±%	Expenditures
Alex Johnstone (incumbent)	7,047	57.75%	+15.37%	$2,312.00
Bruce Carnegie	3,043	24.94%	-	$2,048.71
Blake Hambly	2,113	17.32%	-	-^{1}
Total votes	12,203			
Registered voters				
^{1} These candidates did not submit official financial statements and were, therefore, ineligible to run in the 2022 election. Note: All Hamilton municipal elections are officially non-partisan. Note: Candidate campaign colours are based on the prominent colour used in campaign items (signs, literature, etc.) and are used as a visual differentiation between candidates.
Sources: City of Hamilton, "Nominated School Trustee Candidates" Archived May 4, 2018, at the Wayback Machine

=== Ward 13 ===
Incumbent Ward 13 trustee Greg Van Geffen announced in June 2018 that he was not seeking re-election to the public school board, citing the pressures of the job on his family and business.

Candidates for the October 22, 2018 Hamilton-Wentworth District School Board Ward 13 trustee election
Candidate	Popular vote			Expenditures
Candidate	Votes	%	±%	Expenditures
Paul Tut	2,966	34.84%	-	$6,391.11
Chris Parr	2,361	27.73%	-	$4,294.27
Sukhi Dhillon	1,989	23.36%	-	$5,187.88
Noor Nizam	626	7.35%	-	$317.07
Steven James Laur	571	6.71%	-	-^{1}
Total votes	8,513			
Registered voters				
^{1} These candidates did not submit official financial statements and were, therefore, ineligible to run in the 2022 election. Note: All Hamilton municipal elections are officially non-partisan. Note: Candidate campaign colours are based on the prominent colour used in campaign items (signs, literature, etc.) and are used as a visual differentiation between candidates.
Sources: City of Hamilton, "Nominated School Trustee Candidates" Archived May 4, 2018, at the Wayback Machine

=== Ward 15 ===
Penny Deathe, the incumbent Ward 15 HWDSB Trustee, became the first sitting trustee to announce their intention to seek another term in January 2018.

Candidates for the October 22, 2018 Hamilton-Wentworth District School Board Ward 15 trustee election
Candidate	Popular vote			Expenditures
Candidate	Votes	%	±%	Expenditures
Penny Deathe (incumbent)	3,128	64.47%	+14.34%	$98.08
Janet Creet	1,724	35.53%	-	$0.00
Total votes	4,852			
Registered voters				
Note: All Hamilton municipal elections are officially non-partisan. Note: Candidate campaign colours are based on the prominent colour used in campaign items (signs, literature, etc.) and are used as a visual differentiation between candidates.
Sources: City of Hamilton, "Nominated School Trustee Candidates" Archived May 4, 2018, at the Wayback Machine

== Catholic school board trustee elections ==
=== Ward 1, 2, and 15 ===
Candidates for the October 22, 2018 Hamilton-Wentworth Catholic District School Board Ward 1, 2, and 15 trustee election
Candidate	Popular vote			Expenditures
Candidate	Votes	%	±%	Expenditures
Mark Valvasori (incumbent)	Acclaimed			
Total votes				
Registered voters				
Note: All Hamilton municipal elections are officially non-partisan. Note: Candidate campaign colours are based on the prominent colour used in campaign items (signs, literature, etc.) and are used as a visual differentiation between candidates.
Sources: City of Hamilton, "Nominated School Trustee Candidates" Archived May 4, 2018, at the Wayback Machine

=== Ward 3 and 4 ===
Candidates for the October 22, 2018 Hamilton-Wentworth Catholic District School Board Ward 3 and 4 trustee election
Candidate	Popular vote			Expenditures
Candidate	Votes	%	±%	Expenditures
Anthony Perri (incumbent)	Acclaimed			
Total votes				
Registered voters				
Note: All Hamilton municipal elections are officially non-partisan. Note: Candidate campaign colours are based on the prominent colour used in campaign items (signs, literature, etc.) and are used as a visual differentiation between candidates.
Sources: City of Hamilton, "Nominated School Trustee Candidates" Archived May 4, 2018, at the Wayback Machine

=== Ward 5 ===
On July 25, 2018, former Ward 3 Catholic trustee Ralph Agostino registered seek the Ward 5 trustee seat. In 2014, his son, Sam, was defeated by Aldo D’Intino. The Agostino political family has a long history of serving on the Hamilton-Wentworth Catholic District School Board, as Dominic Agostino, Mary Agostino-Locane, and Rose Agostino have all served on the board.

Candidates for the October 22, 2018 Hamilton-Wentworth Catholic District School Board Ward 5 trustee election
Candidate	Popular vote			Expenditures
Candidate	Votes	%	±%	Expenditures
Aldo D’Intino (incumbent)	1,616	51.46%	+2.77%	$1,085.36
Ralph Agostino	1,524	48.54%	-	$940.21
Total votes	3,140	100%		
Registered voters				
Note: All Hamilton municipal elections are officially non-partisan. Note: Candidate campaign colours are based on the prominent colour used in campaign items (signs, literature, etc.) and are used as a visual differentiation between candidates.
Sources: City of Hamilton, "Nominated School Trustee Candidates" Archived May 4, 2018, at the Wayback Machine

=== Ward 6 ===
On July 25, Ellen Agostino, the wife of former Ward 5 Catholic School Trustee Sam Agostino, registered to seek election to the Catholic School Board.

Candidates for the October 22, 2018 Hamilton-Wentworth Catholic District School Board Ward 6 trustee election
Candidate	Popular vote			Expenditures
Candidate	Votes	%	±%	Expenditures
Joseph Baiardo (incumbent)	1,610	51.90%	-11.49%	$4,696.11
Ellen Agostino	1,248	40.23%	-	$532.99
Elenita Ranas	244	7.87%	-	$5,536.09
Total votes	3,102			
Registered voters				
Note: All Hamilton municipal elections are officially non-partisan. Note: Candidate campaign colours are based on the prominent colour used in campaign items (signs, literature, etc.) and are used as a visual differentiation between candidates.
Sources: City of Hamilton, "Nominated School Trustee Candidates" Archived May 4, 2018, at the Wayback Machine

=== Ward 7 ===
Candidates for the October 22, 2018 Hamilton-Wentworth Catholic District School Board Ward 7 trustee election
Candidate	Popular vote			Expenditures
Candidate	Votes	%	±%	Expenditures
Pat Daly (incumbent)	Acclaimed			
Total votes				
Registered voters				
Note: All Hamilton municipal elections are officially non-partisan. Note: Candidate campaign colours are based on the prominent colour used in campaign items (signs, literature, etc.) and are used as a visual differentiation between candidates.
Sources: City of Hamilton, "Nominated School Trustee Candidates" Archived May 4, 2018, at the Wayback Machine

=== Ward 8 and 14 ===
Candidates for the October 22, 2018 Hamilton-Wentworth Catholic District School Board Ward 8 and 14 trustee election
Candidate	Popular vote			Expenditures
Candidate	Votes	%	±%	Expenditures
John Valvasori (incumbent)	4,685	80.15%	10.57%	$1,501.88
George Kalacherry	1,160	19.85%	-	$886.45
Total votes	5,845			
Registered voters				
Note: All Hamilton municipal elections are officially non-partisan. Note: Candidate campaign colours are based on the prominent colour used in campaign items (signs, literature, etc.) and are used as a visual differentiation between candidates.
Sources: City of Hamilton, "Nominated School Trustee Candidates" Archived May 4, 2018, at the Wayback Machine

=== Ward 9 and 11 ===
Candidates for the October 22, 2018 Hamilton-Wentworth Catholic District School Board Ward 9 and 11 trustee election
Candidate	Popular vote			Expenditures
Candidate	Votes	%	±%	Expenditures
Louis Agro	1,417	35.55%	-	$229.02
Tyler Iorio	1,222	30.66%	-	$1,763.19
Tony Di Mambro	827	20.75%	-	-^{1}
Karmen Crea	520	13.05%	-	$0.00
Total votes	3,986			
Registered voters				
^{1} These candidates did not submit official financial statements and were, therefore, ineligible to run in the 2022 election. Note: All Hamilton municipal elections are officially non-partisan. Note: Candidate campaign colours are based on the prominent colour used in campaign items (signs, literature, etc.) and are used as a visual differentiation between candidates.
Sources: City of Hamilton, "Nominated School Trustee Candidates" Archived May 4, 2018, at the Wayback Machine

=== Ward 10 ===
Candidates for the October 22, 2018 Hamilton-Wentworth Catholic District School Board Ward 10 trustee election
Candidate	Popular vote			Expenditures
Candidate	Votes	%	±%	Expenditures
Mary Nardini (incumbent)	Acclaimed			
Total votes				
Registered voters				
Note: All Hamilton municipal elections are officially non-partisan. Note: Candidate campaign colours are based on the prominent colour used in campaign items (signs, literature, etc.) and are used as a visual differentiation between candidates.
Sources: City of Hamilton, "Nominated School Trustee Candidates" Archived May 4, 2018, at the Wayback Machine

=== Ward 12 and 13 ===
Dundas resident, widower, and retired Catholic School principal Neil Chopp was one of the first candidates to register to seek the seat of Ward 12 and 13 Catholic trustee on May 1. Chopp, a former Brant County educator, was joined by Waterdown resident Phil Homerski on the same day.

Candidates for the October 22, 2018 Hamilton-Wentworth Catholic District School Board Ward 12 and 13 trustee election
Candidate	Popular vote			Expenditures
Candidate	Votes	%	±%	Expenditures
Phil Homerski	1,940	42.68%	-	$1,505.72
Neil Chopp	1,522	33.49%	-	$1,797.02
Olya Lydia Chan	1,083	23.83%	-	$590.44
Total votes	4,545			
Registered voters				
Note: All Hamilton municipal elections are officially non-partisan. Note: Candidate campaign colours are based on the prominent colour used in campaign items (signs, literature, etc.) and are used as a visual differentiation between candidates.
Sources: City of Hamilton, "Nominated School Trustee Candidates" Archived May 4, 2018, at the Wayback Machine

== French Public School Board election ==
Candidates for the October 22, 2018 Hamilton, Ontario Conseil scolaire Viamonde French Public School trustee election
Candidate	Popular vote			Expenditures
Candidate	Votes	%	±%	Expenditures
Pierre Girouard (incumbent)	261	73.52%	+10.3%	$527.91
Denis Frawley	94	26.48%	-	$0.00
Total votes	355			
Registered voters				
Note: All Hamilton municipal elections are officially non-partisan. Note: Candidate campaign colours are based on the prominent colour used in campaign items (signs, literature, etc.) and are used as a visual differentiation between candidates.
Sources: City of Hamilton, "Nominated School Trustee Candidates" Archived May 4, 2018, at the Wayback Machine

== French Catholic School Board election ==
Candidates for the October 22, 2018 Hamilton, Ontario Conseil Scolaire Catholique MonAvenir French Public School trustee election
Candidate	Popular vote			Expenditures
Candidate	Votes	%	±%	Expenditures
Marcel Levesque (incumbent)	Acclaimed			
Total votes				
Registered voters				
Note: All Hamilton municipal elections are officially non-partisan. Note: Candidate campaign colours are based on the prominent colour used in campaign items (signs, literature, etc.) and are used as a visual differentiation between candidates.
Sources: City of Hamilton, "Nominated School Trustee Candidates" Archived May 4, 2018, at the Wayback Machine

== Mid-term elections ==
=== Ward 7 councillor ===
Shortly after being sworn in for a third term as Ward 7 councillor, Scott Duvall announced he would be seeking the New Democratic Party's nomination to run in the 42nd federal election as their candidate on Hamilton Mountain. Duvall was selected by party members in the riding at a nomination meeting on March 29, 2015 to stand as their candidate over his opponent, former provincial NDP candidate Bryan Adamczyk. Duvall was elected to Parliament on October 19, 2015 with 35.8% of the vote.

Prior to Duvall's election, candidates began expressing interest in running for his seat. By September 4, 2015, four candidates had already announced their intention to run in the by-election if it were to be called. On Friday, October 23, 2015, Duvall officially resigned from city council. Duvall told the Hamilton Spectator that, while he had not yet endorsed a replacement, he was watching the competition carefully.

After speculation that the by-election would occur in February or March 2016, the CBC reported on November 2, 2015, that the election would take place on March 21, 2016, following the council's approval of the date through a bylaw passed at their December 9, 2015 council meeting.

As the number of candidates increased, local media began to report on the impact the by-election was having on local political party establishments. Candidates Geraldine McMullen and Uzma Qureshi, both NDP members, maintained the support of varying factions within the party. McMullen received support from former Hamilton Mountain MP Chris Charlton while Qureshi was endorsed by current Hamilton Mountain MPP Monique Taylor and Hamilton Centre MP David Christopherson. Similarly, candidates Bob Charters, Donna Skelly, and Hans Zuriel had the support of elements of Hamilton's Conservative establishment. Charters was the Progressive Conservative's candidate in Hamilton Mountain in 2007, Skelly sought election as a Progressive Conservative in Ancaster-Dundas-Flamborough-Westdale in 2011 and 2014, while Zuriel is the president of the Hamilton Mountain Conservative association and heavily involved with Conservative politics at McMaster University. With the registration of former Hamilton Mountain Liberal candidate Shawn Burt on January 29, the local Liberal Party was also split between their 2015 candidate and Hamilton West-Ancaster-Dundas nomination contestant Howard Rabb. The local Libertarian Party establishment was also split between Luc Hetu, the party's nominated, but unregistered, candidate for the 2015 election in Flamborough-Glanbrook and Robert Young, the party's Hamilton Centre candidate. Both candidates registered on February 1 and both used Young's business address at 616 Barton Street East on their registration forms.

In an interview with the Hamilton Mountain News, McMaster political science professor Dr. Henry Jacek noted that he expected voter turnout to be very low, allowing a candidate to win with around 1,500 votes. He also indicated that by his analysis, while the splits in party support were evident, candidates aligned with the New Democrats were likely to perform well considering their historic support in Ward 7 and the popularity of Scott Duvall.

At the close of nominations on February 5, 22 candidates had registered, making the Ward 7 by-election the most contested election in Hamilton's post-amalgamation history.

Just prior to election day, Qureshi faced criticism from local media and other candidates for a letter mailed to the community from Duvall and MPP Monique Taylor that encouraged strategic voting to defeat candidates with ties to the Conservative Party. Taking aim at McMullen, who had secured the endorsement of the city's labour council and from Duvall's predecessor, Chris Charlton, the letter claimed "It is clear that (Qureshi) has risen above the pack and presents the ONLY choice if we are going to elect a strong progressive councillor for Ward 7." The letter was called "disrespectful" by McMullen and mentioned by Skelly on election night, who called it "political interference".

On election night, Donna Skelly secured victory with 1,967 votes, 92 ballots ahead of second-place finisher, John-Paul Danko. Speaking with reporters after her win, Skelly noted that she wanted to "ruffle a few feathers" with regard to taxes and city finances, while announcing her support for the city's Light Rail Transit project.

Candidates for the March 21, 2016 Hamilton, Ontario Ward 7 councillor by-election
Candidate	Popular vote			Expenditures
Candidate	Votes	%	±%	Expenditures
Donna Skelly	1,967	19.59%	-	$30,524.46
John-Paul Danko	1,875	18.67%	-	$21,530.03
Uzma Qureshi	1,521	15.14%	-	$28,621.86
Shaun Burt	881	8.77%	-	n/a^{1}
Doug Farraway	785	7.82%	-	$12,657
Geraldine McMullen	720	7.17%	-	$27,112.84
Tom Gordon	468	4.66%	-	$2,681.09
Howard Rabb	376	3.74%	-	$17,696.61
Bob Charters	354	3.52%	-	n/a^{1}
Glenn Murphy	255	2.54%	-	$5,840.09
Chelsey Heroux	172	1.71%	-	n/a^{1}
Hans Zuriel	133	1.32%	-	$8,531.42
Philip Bradshaw	110	1.10%	-	$1,450.12
Robert Bolton	95	0.95%	-	n/a^{1}
Jeanne Pacey	95	0.95%	-	n/a^{1}
Louis Vecchioni	64	0.64%	-	$0
Anthony Nicholl	62	0.62%	-	n/a^{1}
Mohammad Shahrouri	48	0.48%	-	$160
Robert Young	22	0.22%	-	$930.87
Paul Nagy	17	0.17%	-	$0
Damin Starr	17	0.17%	-	$7,886.76
Luc Hetu	6	0.06%	-	n/a^{1}
Total votes	10,063	24.35%	=7.4%	$40,005.55
Registered voters	41,332			
^{1} These candidates did not submit official financial statements and were, therefore, ineligible to run in the 2018 municipal election. Note: All Hamilton municipal elections are officially non-partisan. Note: Candidate campaign colours are based on the prominent colour used in campaign items (signs, literature, etc.) and are used as a visual differentiation between candidates.
Sources: City of Hamilton, "Nominated Candidates" Archived 2010-08-20 at the Wayback Machine City of Hamilton, "2016 Candidate Financial Statements Archived September 5, 2018, at the Wayback Machine

== Timeline ==
2014

- October 27, 2014: 2014 municipal election

2015

- January 5, 2015: Ward 7 councillor Scott Duvall announces his intention to run for the New Democratic Party's nomination on Hamilton Mountain.
- March 29, 2015: Duvall is named the NDP's candidate for the 2015 federal election.
- March 30, 2015: Councillors approve city staff's request to hire consultants for a ward boundary review.
- July 28, 2015: Two council candidates from 2014, Ira Rosen (Ward 1) and Toby Yull (Ward 13), are barred from standing in the 2018 election due to their failure to submit audited financial statements.
- October 19, 2015: Duvall is elected to Parliament and indicates he will step down from council.
- October 22, 2015: Duvall officially resigns as councillor for Ward 7.
- December 10, 2015: Nominations for the Ward 7 by-election open.

2016

- February 5, 2016: Nominations for the Ward 7 by-election close with 22 candidates having registered.
- March 21, 2016: Date of the Ward 7 by-election. Candidate Donna Skelly is elected to replace Duvall.
- November 16, 2016: City council votes against a proposal from Councillor Matthew Green to investigate a ranked ballot for the 2018 election.

2017

- February 8, 2017: Council rejects the recommendations of the consultants hired to redraw the city's ward boundaries, opting to redraw the city's wards themselves.
- December 12, 2017: The Ontario Municipal Board imposes a new ward map on Hamilton after citizens appealed council's self-drawn map for the 2018 election. This map eliminates rural Ward 14, instead moving it to the West Mountain, along with making other changes to the city's long-standing electoral boundaries.

2018

- April 9, 2018: City of Hamilton 'Open House' for prospective candidates
- May 1, 2018: Nominations open.
- July 27, 2018: Nominations close.
- October 22, 2018: Election day
