= St. Mary Catholic Secondary School (Hamilton, Ontario) =

Canadian Catholic secondary school

Location
- 200 Whitney Avenue; Hamilton, Ontario, L8S 2G7; Canada; 43.25367°N 79.92776°W

Information
- School type: Public, separate secondary school
- Motto: Live, Love, Learn
- Religious affiliation: Catholic
- Opened: 1970; 56 years ago
- School board: Hamilton-Wentworth Catholic District School Board
- Superintendent: Tracey Ferrie
- Area trustee: Mark Valvasori
- School number: 827401
- Principal: Sofia Palermo
- Chaplain: Don Hall
- Grades: 9–12
- Enrollment: 905 (2020)
- Colours: Blue and gold
- Team name: Crusaders
- Website: Official website

St. Mary Catholic Secondary School is a Catholic secondary school located in Hamilton. It is a part of the Hamilton Wentworth Catholic District School Board.

== History ==
St. Mary Catholic Secondary School opened in 1970 in the former Christ the King Elementary School. It moved to the former Hamilton Teacher's College in 1980. Due to overcrowding, planning for a new school on the current location started in 1992.

== Feeder schools ==
St. Mary Catholic Secondary School feeder schools are: Canadian Martyrs, Guardian Angels, and St. Joseph in Hamilton; Our Lady of Mount Carmel in Carlisle; St. Augustine and St. Bernadette in Dundas; and St. Thomas in Waterdown.

== Extracurriculars ==
=== Rowing ===
The woman’s program has captured 12 National Championship titles, while the men’s program earned its first national championship title in 2005.

== Notable alumni ==
- Jamie Barresi – former offensive coordinator of the Hamilton Tiger-Cats and head coach of the Ottawa Gee-Gees
- Mark Jankowski – professional ice hockey player
- Catherine McKenna – former minister of Infrastructure and Communities
- Joe Stankevicius – Olympic rower
- Carter Verhaeghe – professional ice hockey player

== See also ==
- Education in Ontario
- List of secondary schools in Ontario
