= Hamilton-Wentworth Catholic District School Board =

Catholic school board

Address
- 90 Mulberry Street Hamilton, Ontario, L8N 3R9; Canada
- Coordinates: 43.26303°N 79.87055°W

District information
- Type: School board
- Motto: Believing, Achieving, Serving
- Grades: JK–12^{th}
- Established: 1855; 171 years ago; 1969 (amalgamation); 1998 (present form)
- Chair of the board: John Valvasori
- Director of education: David Hansen
- Governing agency: Ministry of Education
- Schools: 57
- Budget: CA$387 million

Students and staff
- Students: 29,728 (2021)
- Staff: 3,392 (2021)
- Athletic conference: Hamilton-Wentworth Catholic Athletic Association (HWCAA)
- Colours: Blue and orange

Other information
- Website: www.hwcdsb.ca
- Location of board office

The Hamilton-Wentworth Catholic District School Board (HWCDSB) is the Catholic school board for the city of Hamilton, which includes the former Wentworth County. It currently operates 49 elementary schools and 7 secondary schools, along with one continuing education school.

== History ==
The Hamilton Separate School Board (HSSB) was established in 1855 and the seven other boards were formed for the next 114 years in Wentworth County. In 1969, the boards became known as the Hamilton-Wentworth Roman Catholic Separate School Board (HWRCSSB).

Following the Ontario government's passage of the Fewer School Boards Act of 1997, the HWRCSSB became the English-language Separate District School Board No. 47 in 1998 and was renamed to the Hamilton-Wentworth Catholic District School Board (HWCDSB) in 1999. French language schools operated by its francophone unit, the Le conseil des écoles séparées catholiques romaines de Hamilton-Wentworth became part of French-language Separate District School Board No. 58, which later became the Conseil scolaire de district catholique Centre-Sud.

The school board currently operates 57 schools.

== Schools ==
=== Continuing Education Centre ===
- St. Charles Adult and Continuing Education Centre

=== Secondary schools ===
- Bishop Ryan
- Bishop Tonnos
- Cathedral
- St. Jean de Brébeuf
- St. John Henry Newman
- St. Mary
- St. Thomas More

=== Elementary schools ===
- Annunciation of Our Lord
- Blessed Sacrament
- Canadian Martyrs
- Corpus Christi
- Guardian Angels
- Holy Name of Jesus
- Holy Name of Mary
- Immaculate Conception
- Immaculate Heart of Mary
- Our Lady of Hope
- Our Lady of Lourdes
- Our Lady of Mount Carmel
- Our Lady of Peace
- Our Lady of the Assumption
- Regina Mundi
- Sacred Heart of Jesus
- St. Agnes
- St. Ann (Ancaster)
- St. Ann (Hamilton)
- St. Anthony Daniel
- St. Augustine
- St. Bernadette
- St. Clare of Assisi
- St. David
- St. Eugene
- St. Francis Xavier
- St. Gabriel
- St. James the Apostle
- St. Joachim
- St. John Paul II
- St. John the Baptist
- St. Joseph
- St. Kateri Tekakwitha
- St. Lawrence
- St. Luke
- St. Margaret Mary
- St. Marguerite d'Youville
- St. Mark
- St. Martin of Tours
- St. Matthew
- St. Michael
- St. Patrick
- St. Paul
- St. Teresa of Avila
- St. Teresa of Calcutta
- St. Thérèse of Lisieux
- St. Thomas the Apostle
- St. Vincent de Paul
- Sts. Peter and Paul

The following schools in the school board offer French immersion:

- St. Clare of Assisi Catholic Elementary School
- St. Vincent de Paul Catholic Elementary School
- St. Joseph Catholic Elementary School
- St. Eugene Catholic Elementary School
- Sts. Peter & Paul Catholic Elementary School

== Trustees ==
The HWCDSB consists of 9 trustees elected from wards across the City of Hamilton. These wards either match or are the combination of multiple municipal wards for council elections. Trustees are elected for a four-year term during each municipal election. The last election for trustees was held on October 22, 2018. The next election for trustees was held on October 24, 2022.

Catholic school trustees are expected to advance the goal of Catholic education, participate in their parish, and "provide support, encouragement and prayer for the efforts of all persons engaged in the ministry of Catholic Education", in accordance with the HWCDSB's Trustee Code of Conduct.

Ward	Trustee	Ward Name
Wards 1, 2, & 15	Mark Valvasori	West Hamilton-Flamborough
Wards 3 & 4	Josie Angelini	Hamilton Centre/East
Ward 5	Aldo D'Intino	Red Hill
Ward 6	Ellen Agostino	East Mountain
Ward 7	Tyler Iorio	Central Mountain
Ward 8 & 14	John Valvasori	West Mountain
Wards 9 & 11	Louis Agro	Upper Stoney Creek-Glanbrook
Ward 10	Mary Nardini	Lower Stoney Creek
Wards 12 & 13	Phil Homerski	Ancaster-Dundas
Student Trustee	Klara Pasalic	All Students
Student Trustee	Joshua Canzio	All Students

== See also ==
- Hamilton-Wentworth District School Board
- List of High Schools in Hamilton
- List of school districts in Ontario
- List of secondary schools in Ontario
