= St. Jean de Brébeuf Catholic Secondary School =

Canadian Catholic secondary school

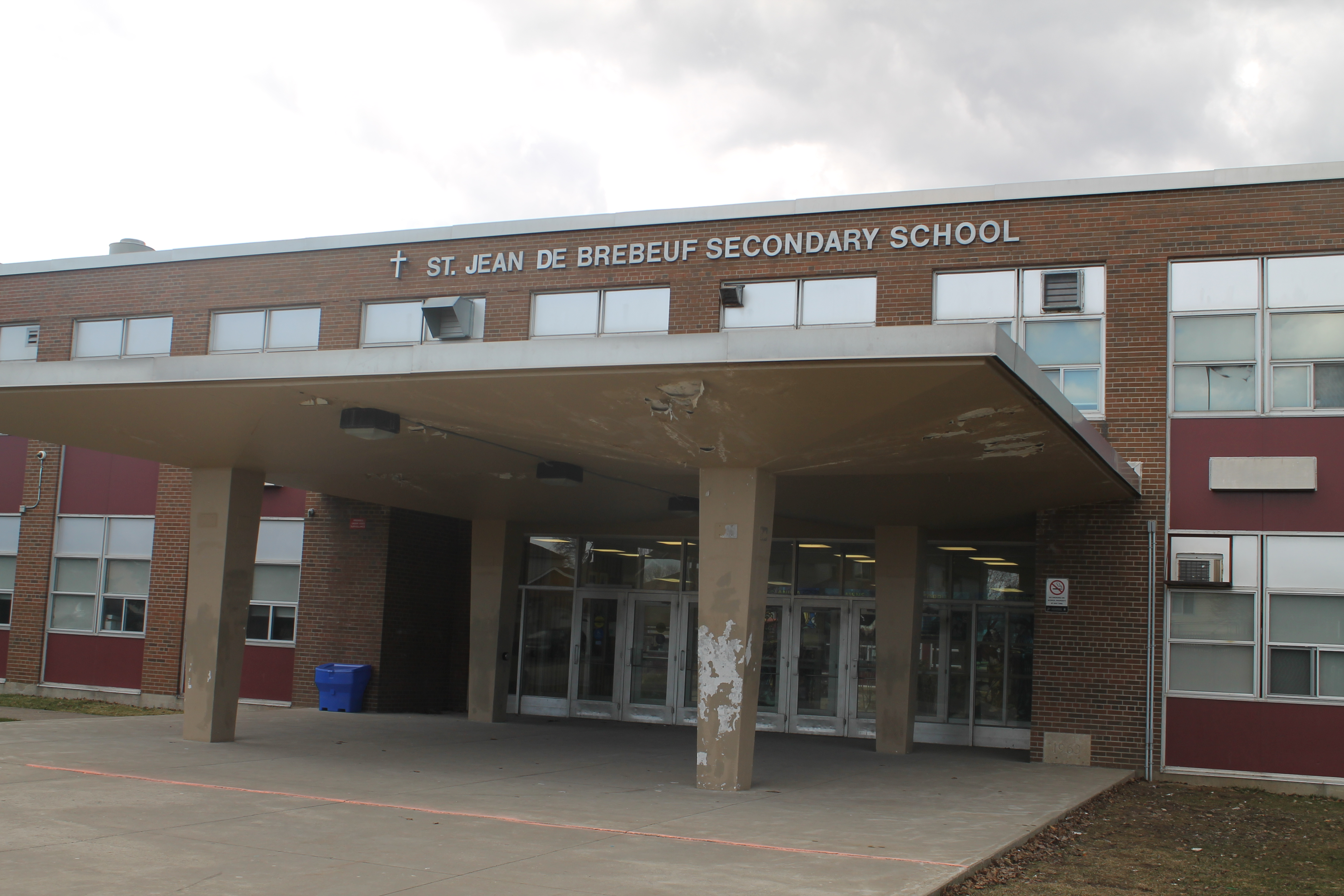
- St. Jean de Brébeuf Catholic Secondary School in 2014

Location
- 200 Acadia Drive; Hamilton, Ontario, L8W 3B8; Canada; 43.2021°N 79.8632°W

Information
- School type: Public, separate secondary school
- Motto: Latin: Anima, Mens, Corpus (Soul, Mind, Body)
- Religious affiliation: Catholic
- Patron saint: Jean de Brébeuf
- Established: 1974
- School board: Hamilton-Wentworth Catholic District School Board
- Superintendent: Dean DiFrancesco
- Area trustee: Patrick J. Daly
- School number: 800430
- Principal: Roberto Lombardi
- Chaplain: Sharon Boase; Tina Fitzgerald
- Grades: 9–12
- Enrolment: 1,480 (2020)
- Colours: Maroon and gold
- Slogan: Be brave
- Team name: Braves
- Yearbook: Echon
- Website: Official website

St. Jean de Brébeuf Catholic Secondary School is a Catholic secondary school for the city of Hamilton. It is a part of the Hamilton-Wentworth Catholic District School Board and is located on the East Mountain of the city, serving the south-east of Hamilton as well as parts of Binbrook, Caledonia and Glanbrook.

The school's Latin motto is "anima, mens, corpus". St. Jean de Brébeuf Catholic Secondary School is often referred to as SJB or Brébeuf. It graduates approximately 350 students every year with over 75% of them going onto post-secondary education.

== Athletics ==
Brébeuf participates in the Golden Horseshoe with other Catholic secondary schools. The school won HWCDSB City titles for Midget Boys Basketball and Senior Boys Volleyball in 2017-18 while the Senior Boys Soccer team won GHAC to represent at OFSAA.

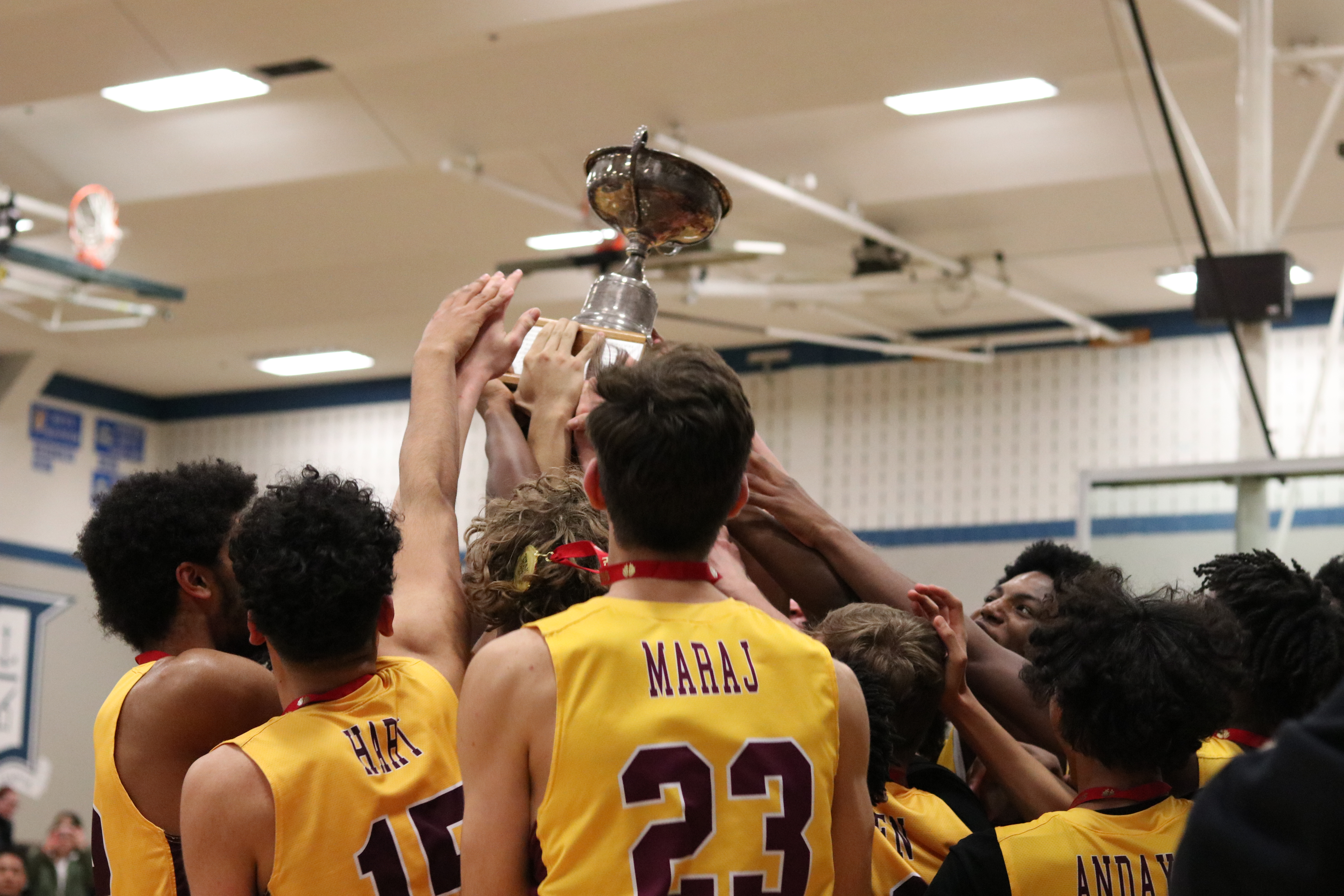
SJB raises the Senior Boys 2020 HWCDSB basketball championship trophy.

Brébeuf fields the following teams annually:

- Junior Boys Football
- Senior Boys Football
- Junior Boys and Girls Soccer
- Senior Boys and Girls Soccer
- Midget, Junior, and Senior Boys and Girls basketball
- Girls Rugby (Varsity)
- Boys and Girls Hockey (Varsity)
- Track and Field
- Badminton
- Junior and Senior Boys and Girls Volleyball
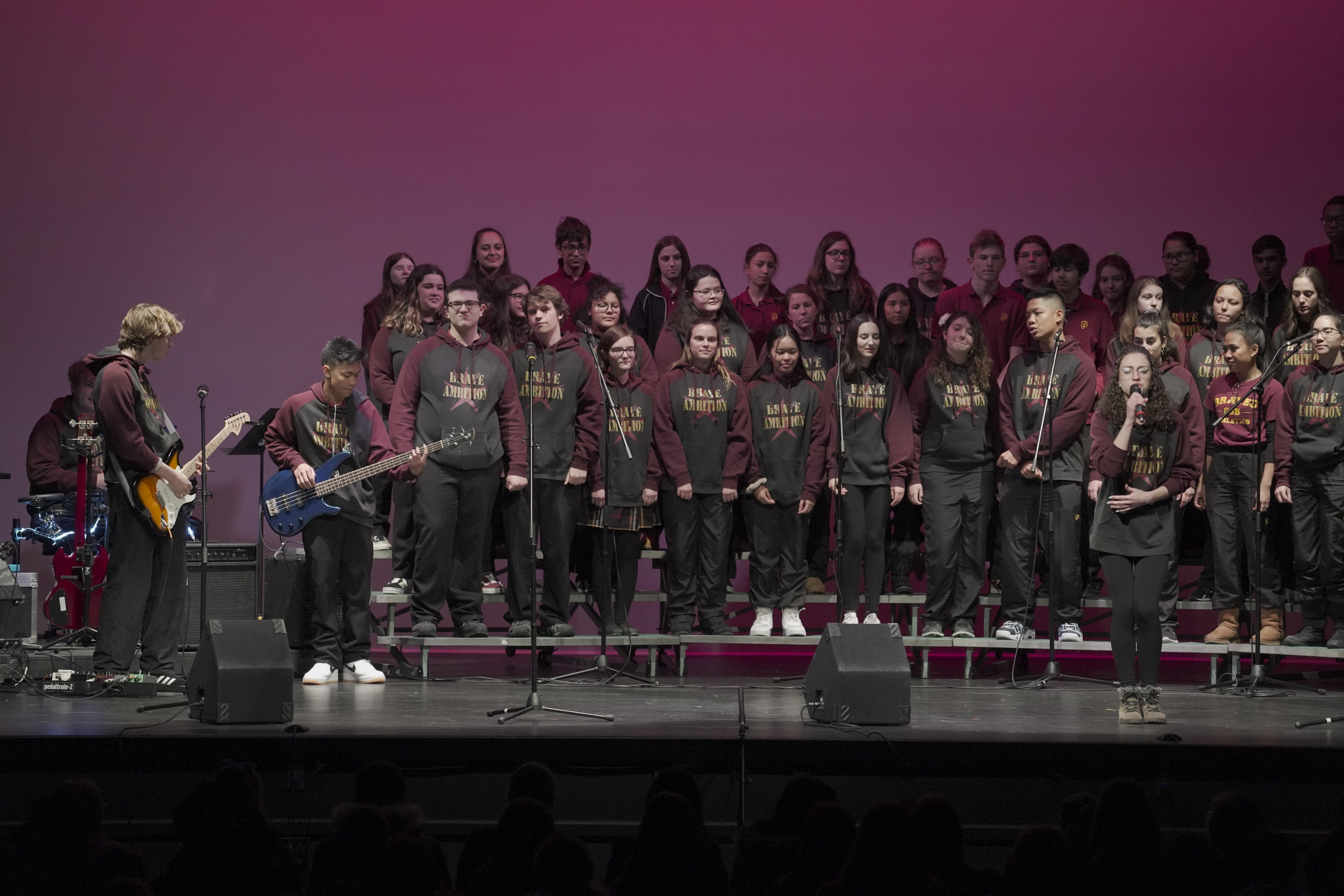
- SJB's "Brave Ambition" music ensemble plays at the Brébeuf Arts Showcase in December 2019.
  Swimming (Varsity)
- Wrestling (Varsity)
- Coed Beach Volleyball (Varsity)

== Student council ==
Brébeuf's student council donates their profits from events to local charities at the end of the year, as well as running charity events during the school year.

== Feeder schools ==
- St. Margaret Mary
- Our Lady of Lourdes
- St. John Paul II
- Blessed Teresa of Calcutta
- Sacred Heart
- St. Anthony Daniel
- St. Kateri Tekakwitha
- St. Michael
- Blessed Sacrament
- St. Marguerite d'Youville

== Notable alumni ==
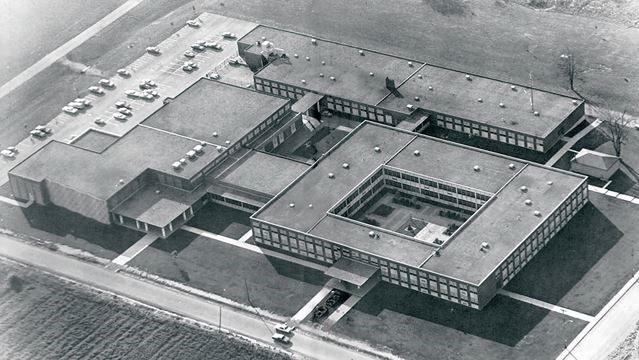
An aerial view from 1969 of building that now houses St. Jean de Brébeuf C.S.S.

- Dave Andreychuk – former NHL Player
- Joey Cupido - NLL lacrosse player - Georgia Swarm
- Luka Gavran - Goalkeeper for Toronto FC
- Adam Mair – former NHL Hockey Player
- Blake McGrath – dancer, pop singer and choreographer (Best known for being a judge on "So you Think You Can Dance Canada")
- Brian McGrattan – NHL Hockey Player
- Spencer Moore – CFL Player – Saskatchewan Roughriders
- Zac Rinaldo – NHL Player

== See also ==
- Education in Ontario
- List of secondary schools in Ontario
