= Sheffield, Ontario =

Village in Ontario, Canada

Coordinates: 43.324°N 80.201°W

Location of Sheffield in Ontario

Sheffield (population 423) is a small village and rural community in the single-tier municipality of Hamilton, Ontario. It is located just off Highway 8, on the municipality's boundary with the Regional Municipality of Waterloo. It is 10 kilometres from the city of Cambridge and 35 from Hamilton's downtown core. The village lay on the road between the two cities until 1959, when the Sheffield Bypass was completed. Ontario Highway 8 still follows the route of the bypass; the main street through Sheffield is now a 2.4 km section of municipal road known as Old Highway 8.

Local institutions include Lee Academy, Sheffield United Church, Zion United Reformed Church, and Grace Covenant Church. Local organizations include the Sheffield Lions Club, the Clyde & Scott's Women's Institute, and Sheffield Minor Ball, which uses the Sheffield Ball Park.

Local businesses include a garden centre, garage, farm supply store, veterinary office, golf course, and a modern-day blacksmith & iron works.

Located approximately two kilometres east of Sheffield is the Rockton Aerodrome, a private dirt airfield home to a local gliding club. The Sheffield Community Centre is located three kilometres south of the village in the former Pleasant Grove School. Located approximately three kilometres north-east of Sheffield is a major tourist attraction, the African Lion Safari.

== History ==
Non-Indigenous settlement began in the Sheffield area in the early 1800s. The village was founded by Rev. John A. Cornell, an immigrant from Dutchess County, New York, who settled at the site in 1809. He became a preacher in 1812, founding the first church in Beverly Township. Church services were initially held in Cornell's barn and house, and in neighbouring communities. In 1834, a church was built by Cornell's congregation in Sheffield. The current United Church in Sheffield sits on the same site.

Sheffield was originally known as "The Cornell Settlement", but was named "Sheffield" by John A. Cornell with the establishment of the first post office circa 1832.

By 1857, Sheffield's village population was 160, and the village included a general store/post office, shoemaker, blacksmith, physician/surgeon, wagon maker, and hotel ("Sheffield House"). There was also a public school and three churches: the United Brethren in Christ (John A. Cornell's original congregation), the Wesleyan Methodists, and the Church of England (at Romulus). By at least 1868 there was a tailor. Throughout its history, most of the population of the Sheffield community was engaged in agriculture or related services, but today the majority of residents are employed in nearby cities or are retired.
