= 2010 Hamilton, Ontario, municipal election =

Municipal election

2010 Hamilton municipal election
- October 25, 2010
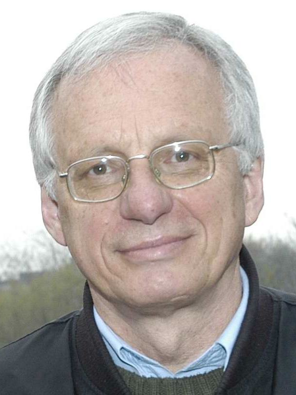

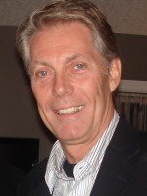
Candidate	Bob Bratina	Larry Di Ianni	Fred Eisenberger
Popular vote	52,684	40,091	38,719
Percentage	37.32%	28.40%	27.43%
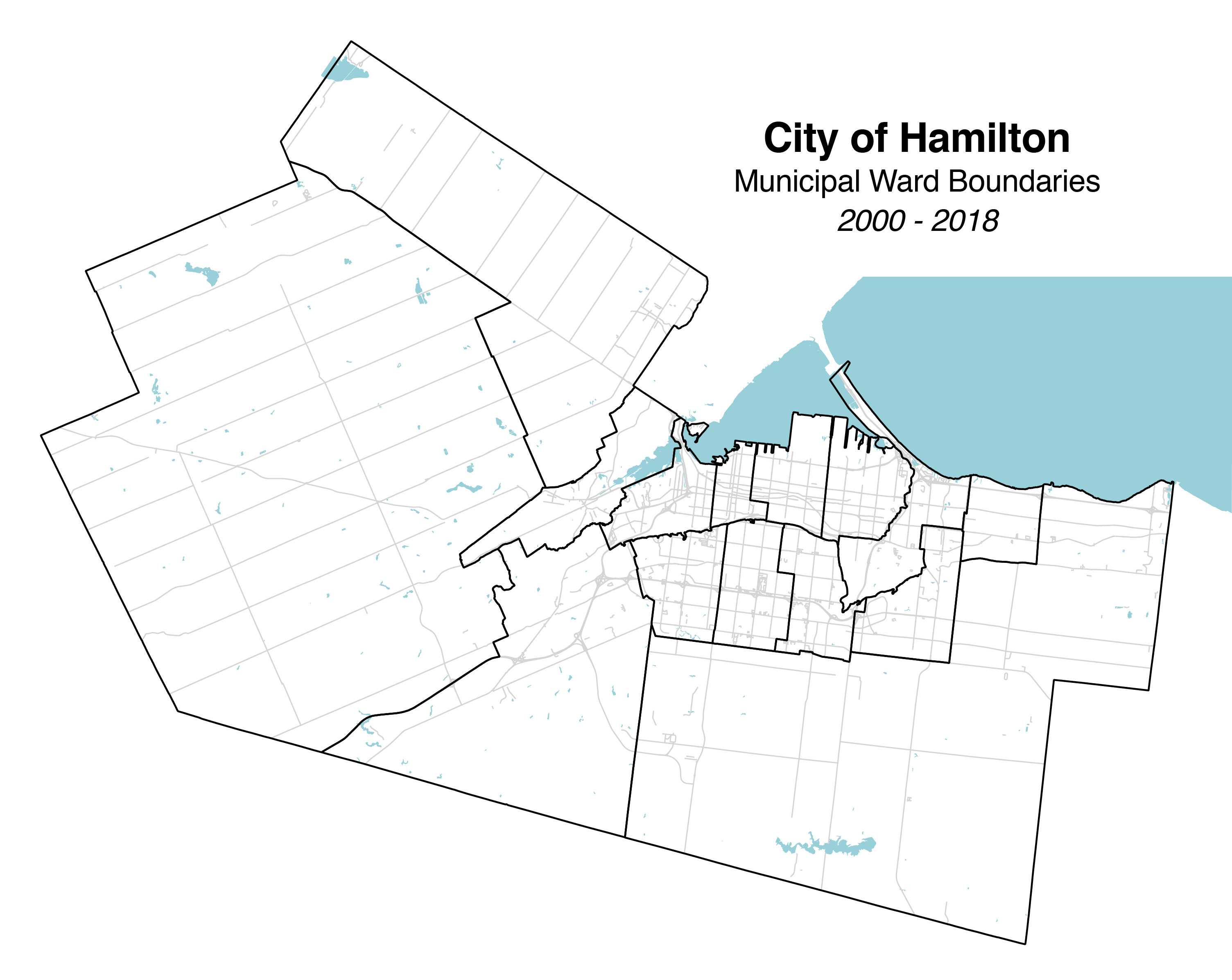
- The ward boundaries used for the 2010 municipal election
Mayor before election
Fred Eisenberger
Elected mayor
Bob Bratina

The 2010 Hamilton municipal election was held on October 25, 2010, to select one mayor, fifteen members of the Hamilton, Ontario City Council and members of both English and French public and Catholic school boards. Nominations opened on January 4, 2010, and ran until September 10, 2010.

Hamiltonians elected their third mayor in as many elections, choosing former Ward 2 Councillor Bob Bratina over Larry Di Ianni (mayor 2003–2006) and incumbent mayor Fred Eisenberger, who had served in the role since 2006. The council election to succeed Bratina in Ward 2 drew 20 candidates, while Ward 14 Councillor Robert Patsuta was acclaimed. Only one incumbent councillor was defeated: Brenda Johnstone defeated long-time councillor Dave Mitchell in Ward 11. Many Catholic school board trustees were defeated by first-time candidates.

== New measures ==
Council backed a measure to elect the boards of Local Health Integration Networks (LHINs), a move that was in response to the LHIN affair, though this did not occur in time for the 2010 election.

There was speculation that this election was to include a new 16th council seat, that would encompass southern portions of Wards 6, 7 and 8, and the northern portion of Ward 11. The new ward would have included the area to be developed as part of the controversial "Aerotropolis" industrial development plan, though that plan was abandoned in favour of a study of all ward boundaries following the election.

Bill 212, passed by the Ontario Legislature, moved municipal elections from the first Monday in November to the fourth Monday in October, shortening the campaign period by two weeks and moving close of nominations to September 10, 2010.

== Mayoral election ==
Eisenberger's upset victory in 2006, his perceived 'weak governing' style in dealing with council and the Pan Am Games Stadium debate sparked vigorous debate over challengers and led to the largest number of candidates filing to run for the office of mayor in the city's post-amalgamation history.

=== Candidates ===
- Michael Baldasaro, leader of the Church of the Universe
- Bob Bratina, city councillor for Ward 2 (Downtown)
- Mahesh Butani, developer
- Larry Di Ianni, former mayor of Hamilton
- Fred Eisenberger, then mayor of Hamilton
- Pasquale Filice, photographer and lawyer
- Edward Graydon, blogger and businessman
- Andrew Haines, human rights activist
- Glenn Hamilton, businessman and property manager
- Ken Leach
- Tone Marrone, actor and former offensive lineman for the Hamilton Tiger-Cats
- Gino Speziale, tool and die maker
- Victor Veri, farmer
- Steven Waxman, businessman
- Mark Wozny
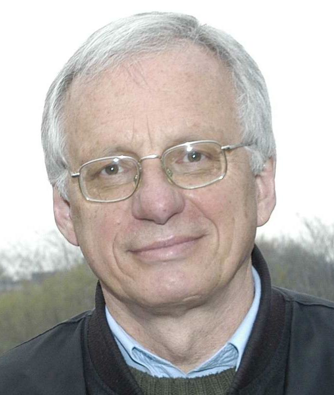
Downtown Councillor Bob Bratina

Developer Mahesh Butani

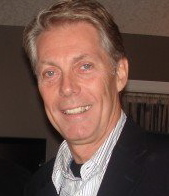
Mayor Fred Eisenberger

Lawyer Pasquale Filice

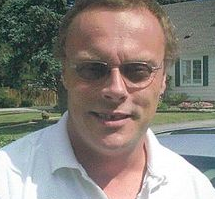
Marijuana activist Andrew Haines

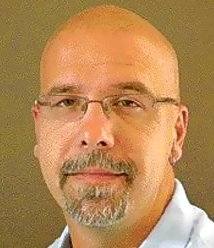
Contender Ken Leach

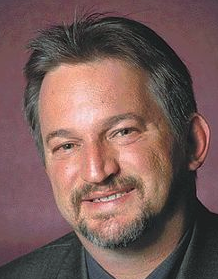
Tool and die maker Gino Speziale

Farmer Victor Veri

Deli owner Steven Waxman

Contender Mark Wozny

=== Campaign ===
Michael Baldasaro was the first candidate to file in early January and was later joined by self-proclaimed marijuana advocate Andrew Haines. Mahesh P. Butani filed his nomination in mid-April and Mayor Fred Eisenberger, having already confirmed he would be seeking a second term in mid-2008, filed on May 31.

Following months of speculation, former Mayor Larry Di Ianni announced that he would be standing in the mayoral election in an interview with the Hamilton Spectator on July 26. Perennial joke candidate Marty Zulinak filed soon after, claiming that he would finance his campaign with money from returning used beer bottles. He later dropped out and ran for Ward 13 (Dundas) city councillor.

The Pan Am Games Stadium controversy developed in August. Mayor Eisenberger took the side of the proposed West Harbour location on Hamilton's Waterfront. The ensuing local debate became so passionately heated that Eisenberger began receiving death threats, and council, after affirming their support for the West Harbour, reversed their decision and initiated a reevaluation of potential sites. Though the mayor was commended by Toronto's Mayor David Miller and lauded as the week's boldest leader in The Globe and Mail, his handling of the situation caused former New Democratic MP and MPP Ian Deans and Ward 2 (Downtown) Councillor Bob Bratina to announce they would be contesting the election.

Though Deans withdrew from the mayoral race on Thursday, September 9 to run for Ward 2 councillor, Eisenberger faced fourteen opposing candidates after the close of nominations on September 10, 2010.

On Thursday, October 7, following a debate at Sir John A. Macdonald High School, Edward Graydon unofficially dropped out of the race after fellow contender Andrew Haines told him to "smoke a joint". Graydon was outraged at the comments, and decided to withdraw from the race to support Larry Di Ianni, who came to his defence following Haines' comments. Di Ianni then asserted marijuana advocates should not be attending debates at high schools and school board officials announced they would be reiterating the school's official anti-drug policies the following day. Graydon continued to attend the mayoralty debates, and his name remained on the ballot, as the official withdrawal date had passed by the time he 'withdrew'.

=== Results ===
52,684	40,091	38,719	2,892	1,052	5,736
Bratina	Di Ianni	Eisenberger	Blds	T.M.	Others

Summary of the October 25, 2010 Hamilton, Ontario mayoral election
Candidate	Popular vote		
Candidate	Votes	%	±%
Bob Bratina	52,684	37.32%	n/a
Larry Di Ianni	40,091	28.40%	-14.44%
Fred Eisenberger (incumbent)	38,719	27.43%	-15.78%
Michael Baldasaro	2,892	2.05%	-1.56%
Tone Marrone	1,052	0.75%	n/a
Mahesh Butani	950	0.67%	n/a
Glenn Hamilton	949	0.67%	n/a
Pasquale (Pat) Filice	768	0.54%	n/a
Ken Leach	577	0.41%	n/a
Andrew Haines	557	0.39%	n/a
Mark Wozny	433	0.31%	n/a
Steven Waxman	429	0.30%	n/a
Edward Graydon	404	0.29%	n/a
Gino Speziale	356	0.25%	-0.77%
Victor Veri	313	0.22%	n/a
Total votes	141,174	100%	
Registered voters	353,317	40.45%	+3.2%
Note: All Hamilton municipal elections are officially non-partisan. Note: Candidate campaign colours are based on the prominent colour used in campaign items (signs, literature, etc.) and are used as a visual differentiation between candidates.
Sources: Hamilton, Ontario, City Clerk's Office

== City council election ==
=== Ward One (Chedoke-Cootes) ===
The campaign for councillor in Ward One focused heavily on the Pan Am Stadium. The West Hamilton Ward was a potential host site for the venue, a fact that incumbent Councillor Brian McHattie passionately opposed. During the election, McHattie ran on a campaign of continuing a push for light rail transit, expanded HSR bus service and improved environmental and anti-poverty projects.

Challenger Raymond Paquette campaigned on a similar platform, with the exception of supporting an increased number of liquor licenses granted to restaurants in Westdale Village, an area popular with McMaster University students.

All three candidates vocally opposed the Pam Am Stadium being placed in Ward One. Each candidate was concerned about the strain such a venue would have on the community surrounding the proposed site, a working CP rail yard.

Summary of the October 25, 2010 Hamilton, Ontario Ward One councillor election
Candidate	Popular vote		
Candidate	Votes	%	±%
Brian McHattie (incumbent)	5,373	64.90%	+2.02%
Tony Greco	2,187	26.42%	-8.78%
Raymond Paquette	719	8.68%	n/a
Total votes	8279	100%	
Registered voters	20,767	40.7%	+2.29%
Note: All Hamilton municipal elections are officially non-partisan. Note: Candidate campaign colours are based on the prominent colour used in campaign items (signs, literature, etc.) and are used as a visual differentiation between candidates.
Sources: Hamilton, Ontario, City Clerk's Office

- Brian McHattie, councillor since 2003, ran for a third term in Ward One.
- Tony Greco is a local barber and stood as a candidate for Ward One Councillor in 2006, garnering 33% in contrast to Councillor McHattie's 63%.
- Raymond Paquette is the owner of Ray's Place, a Dundurn Street restaurant.

=== Ward Two (Downtown) ===
Summary of the October 25, 2010 Hamilton, Ontario Ward Two councillor election
Candidate	Popular vote		
Candidate	Votes	%	±%
Jason Farr	1,607	20.97%	n/a
Matt Jelly	1,434	18.72%	n/a
Martinus Geleynse	805	10.51%	n/a
Erik Hess	602	7.86%	n/a
Marvin Caplan	559	7.30%	n/a
James Novak	514	6.71%	n/a
Diane Chiarelli	403	5.26%	n/a
HooJung Jones	312	4.07%	n/a
Ian Deans	231	3.01%	n/a
Shane Coleman	217	2.83%	n/a
Matteo Gentile	174	2.27%	n/a
Charlie Pipe	135	1.76%	n/a
Ned Janjic	113	1.47%	n/a
Lloyd Ferguson	102	1.33%	n/a
Liban Abdi	96	1.25%	n/a
Kevin Wright	91	1.19%	n/a
Paul Casey	81	1.06%	n/a
Dawn Lescaudron	77	1.00%	-4.32%
Pat Ielasi	67	0.87%	n/a
John Castle	42	0.55%	n/a
Total votes	7,662	100%	
Registered voters	19,424	40.43%	+9.18%
Note: All Hamilton municipal elections are officially non-partisan. Note: Candidate campaign colours are based on the prominent colour used in campaign items (signs, literature, etc.) and are used as a visual differentiation between candidates.
Sources: Hamilton, Ontario, City Clerk's Office

- Jason Farr was employed as a host with Cable 14 prior to the election. He was also a volunteer with the Hamilton chapter of the Kiwanis Boys and Girls Club and Camp Maple Leaf/Committed for Kids (BANYAN Community).
- Matt Jelly is a local activist who organizes volunteer activities in the downtown core. He ran for mayor in 2003, finishing seventh out of as many candidates.
- Martinus Geleynse was a local entrepreneur and the director of the Hamilton24, a large arts festival. Geleynse was also an organizer with the Our City, Our Future campaign, which promoted the proposed West Harbour stadium for the 2015 Pan American Games.
- Erik Hess was a professional landscape architect and superintendent of park development for the city of Hamilton. He also served as an independent consultant for the waterfront trust and as a member of the King Street West Business Improvement Area.
- Former Ward One Councillor Marvin Caplan, who served from 1994 until 2003, filed to run in Ward Two on September 8.
- James Novak had been the Elections Canada returning officer for Hamilton Centre and a longtime resident of Hamilton's lower city. After the resignation of Councillor Andrea Horwath, he ran in the 2004 by-election to fill her Ward Two seat.
- Diane Chiarelli was a partner with Chiarelli & Noble and the co-founder of United Grandparents of Canada.
- HooJung Jones, a Korean-Canadian businesswoman and author, was most notable for her book, Canadians Our Heroes, 1950-1953 Korean War. She graduated from McMaster's Commerce program in 1999.
- Ian Deans, former New Democratic MP for Hamilton Mountain, filed to run for mayor on September 2, after openly speculating about a return to politics in a mid-2008 interview with the Hamilton Mountain News. He withdrew from the race to run for Ward 2 councillor on September 7.
- Shane Coleman was the son of a stall-holder at the Hamilton Farmer's Market, and had, prior to running, lobbied the city for subsidized parking for market patrons.
- Matteo Gentile, a Mohawk College graduate, operated a small restaurant.
- Charlie Pipe was a line operator at Procter and Gamble who had graduated from the Dundas Valley School of Art.
- Ned Janjic, a graduate of McMaster University's Political Science program, was a property owner and developer in Hamilton since completing his studies.
- Lloyd Ferguson
- Somali-Canadian Liban Abdi, an employee with Settlement and Integration Services Ontario (SISO), sought election in the downtown ward.
- Kevin Wright is a former officer in the Canadian Forces and has worked with numerous non-profit groups city- and province-wide.
- Paul Casey
- Dawn Lescaudron ran in the 2006 election, placing third behind winner Bob Bratina with just over 5% of the vote.
- Pat Ielasi
- John Castle

=== Ward Three (East Hamilton) ===
Summary of the October 25, 2010 Hamilton, Ontario Ward Three councillor election
Candidate	Popular vote		
Candidate	Votes	%	±%
Bernie Morelli (incumbent)	3,186	44.66%	-27.99%
Paul Tetley	1,720	24.11%	n/a
Sean Gibson	976	13.68%	-13.67%
Mark DiMillo	723	10.13%	n/a
Bob Black	373	5.23%	n/a
Wilamina McGrimmond	156	2.19%	n/a
Total votes	7,329	100%	
Registered voters	23,670	31.0%	+4.37%
Note: All Hamilton municipal elections are officially non-partisan. Note: Candidate campaign colours are based on the prominent colour used in campaign items (signs, literature, etc.) and are used as a visual differentiation between candidates.
Sources: Hamilton, Ontario, City Clerk's Office Archived 2010-08-20 at the Wayback Machine, 2006 City of Hamilton Municipal Election Site, 2010 City of Hamilton Municipal Election Site

- Bob Black works with the Hamilton Area Labour Council.
- Mark DiMillo ran in Ward 7 in the 2006 election, capturing 1,179 votes (8.48%), finishing fifth in the election won by incumbent Scott Duvall.
- Sean Gibson ran in the 2006 election, gaining 27% to incumbent councillor Bernie Morelli's 73%.
- Wilamina McGrimmond was a native rights activist, and sought the provincial New Democratic Party nomination for Hamilton East-Stoney Creek in the 2007 provincial election.
- Longtime incumbent councillor Bernie Morelli filed for re-election, despite rumours that he would not stand in 2010.
- Paul Tetley was a Ward 3 homeowner and a businessman, whose campaign slogan was "Get Ready for Change" and whose focus was on "Vision, Leadership and Change".

=== Ward Four (East Hamilton) ===
Summary of the October 25, 2010 Hamilton, Ontario Ward Four councillor election
Candidate	Popular vote		
Candidate	Votes	%	±%
Sam Merulla (incumbent)	6,787	82.41%	+19.37
Norm Bulbrook	743	9.02%	+4.39
Giulio Cicconi	706	8.57%	n/a
Total votes	8,420	100%	
Registered voters	23,721	35.5%	+1.02%
Note: All Hamilton municipal elections are officially non-partisan. Note: Candidate campaign colours are based on the prominent colour used in campaign items (signs, literature, etc.) and are used as a visual differentiation between candidates.
Sources: Hamilton, Ontario, City Clerk's Office Archived 2010-08-20 at the Wayback Machine

- Norm Bulbrook ran in the 2006 election and placed 3rd, with 4.63% of the vote.
- Giulio Cicconi is the treasurer of the United Steelworkers Local 8782 at U.S. Steel's Nanticoke Plant.
- Sam Merulla is the ward's two-term incumbent councillor, with close affiliations with the New Democrats. In 2006, he collected 5005 votes and won over closest challenger Dave Wilson.

=== Ward Five (Redhill) ===
Summary of the October 25, 2010 Hamilton, Ontario Ward Five councillor election
Candidate	Popular vote		
Candidate	Votes	%	±%
Chad Collins (incumbent)	6,876	66.92%	-23.34%
Frank Rukavina	1,512	14.72%	n/a
Jaswinder Bedi	1,220	11.87%	n/a
Dave Stacey	667	6.49%	n/a
Total votes	10,642	100%	
Registered voters	25,755	41.3%	+3.43%
Note: All Hamilton municipal elections are officially non-partisan. Note: Candidate campaign colours are based on the prominent colour used in campaign items (signs, literature, etc.) and are used as a visual differentiation between candidates.
Sources: Hamilton, Ontario, City Clerk's Office Archived 2010-08-20 at the Wayback Machine

- Jaswinder Bedi was a representative of the Ontario Taxiworkers Union.
- Incumbent councillor Chad Collins, who had served on Hamilton City Council since 1994, sought re-election in his east Hamilton ward.
- Frank Rukavina was the Conservative candidate in Hamilton East-Stoney Creek in the 2008 federal election.
- Dave Stacey filed on the last day of nominations, September 10.

=== Ward Six (East Mountain) ===
Summary of the October 25, 2010 Hamilton, Ontario Ward Six councillor election
Candidate	Popular vote		
Candidate	Votes	%	±%
Tom Jackson (incumbent)	6,560	54.90%	-24.8%
Chris Behrens	1,693	14.17%	n/a
Michelle Febers	1,510	12.64%	n/a
Ed Pecyna	1,127	9.43%	n/a
Nathalie Xian Yi Yan	862	7.21%	-13.09%
Steven Knowles	198	1.66%	n/a
Total votes	12,190	100%	
Registered voters	28,266	43.1%	+3.72%
Note: All Hamilton municipal elections are officially non-partisan. Note: Candidate campaign colours are based on the prominent colour used in campaign items (signs, literature, etc.) and are used as a visual differentiation between candidates.
Sources: Hamilton, Ontario, City Clerk's Office Archived 2010-08-20 at the Wayback Machine

- Chris Behrens, who filed on July 27, was a high school Automotive and Transportation technology teacher.
- Michelle Febers was the co-chair of the Hamilton Make It Seven Day rally, an event in support of RIM CEO Jim Balsillie's attempt to relocate the Phoenix Coyotes to Hamilton.
- 22-year council veteran Tom Jackson sought another term in Ward 6. Jackson was, at the time, the longest serving member of council, having completed seven terms as Ward 6's representative.
- Challenger Steven Knowles stepped up on August 18.
- Ed Pecyna was the St. Margaret Mary Catholic Elementary School Council president.
- Nathalie Xian Yi Yan decided to run in Ward 6 again, after receiving 2,160 votes and losing to councillor Tom Jackson in the 2006 election.

=== Ward Seven (Central Mountain) ===
Summary of the October 25, 2010 Hamilton, Ontario Ward Seven councillor election
Candidate	Popular vote		
Candidate	Votes	%	±%
Scott Duvall (incumbent)	9,027	57.61%	+28.05%
Trevor Pettit	3,938	25.13%	n/a
John Gallagher	1,899	12.12%	+2.91%
Keith Beck	805	5.14%	n/a
Total votes	16,173	100%	
Registered voters	40,571	39.9 %	+2.97%
Note: All Hamilton municipal elections are officially non-partisan. Note: Candidate campaign colours are based on the prominent colour used in campaign items (signs, literature, etc.) and are used as a visual differentiation between candidates.
Sources: Hamilton, Ontario, City Clerk's Office Archived 2010-08-20 at the Wayback Machine

- Keith Beck had filed to run in Ward Two earlier in the year, but dropped out of the race on August 4. Previously, he had received 507 votes in the 2006 election, though as a candidate for Ward 10 and, prior to the close of nominations that year, he had filed papers to run for mayor, but withdrew from that race to pursue a councillor's position.
- First-term Councillor Scott Duvall announced that he would be seeking a second term in the Mountain News on January 1, 2010. He officially filed to run in Ward 7 again on the first day nominations opened, January 4.
- John Gallagher also stood in the 2006 election for the position of Ward Seven Councillor, placing fourth with 9.21% of the vote.
- Trevor Pettit, who filed on September 2, was the former Progressive Conservative MPP for Hamilton Mountain.

=== Ward Eight (West Mountain) ===
Ward Eight's council race was marked by the unofficial withdrawal of two candidates, namely Jeff Bonner for personal reasons and Bruce Whitelaw in support of incumbent Councillor Terry Whitehead's campaign.

Whitehead's last campaigning opponent, Kim Jenkinson, wrote a post-election reflection for The Hamilton Spectator, where she outlined her reasons for running and the process by which she campaigned. In the article, she noted, "I've had my say, I've played fair, and I have met some interesting people, and had my family and friends at my back the whole way."

Summary of the October 25, 2010 Hamilton, Ontario Ward Eight councillor election
Candidate	Popular vote		
Candidate	Votes	%	±%
Terry Whitehead (incumbent)	9,908	67.37%	+11.65%
Kim Jenkinson	3,877	26.36%	n/a
Bruce Whitelaw	471	3.20%	n/a
Jeff Bonner	451	3.07%	n/a
Total votes	15,135	100%	
Registered voters	34,259	44.2%	+1.19%
Note: All Hamilton municipal elections are officially non-partisan. Note: Candidate campaign colours are based on the prominent colour used in campaign items (signs, literature, etc.) and are used as a visual differentiation between candidates.
Sources: Hamilton, Ontario, City Clerk's Office Archived 2010-08-20 at the Wayback Machine, Hamilton Election Results

- Realtor and Mohawk College alumnus Jeff Bonner filed to run for council on July 8. On September 23, Bonner announced he would be ceasing all campaign activities due to issues of a "personal nature".
- Kim Jenkinson, BA, CGA is currently the controller for a children's charity. Jenkinson ran what she called a 'back to basics' campaign, highlighting a platform of accountability and action.
- Incumbent Councillor Terry Whitehead filed for re-election on July 21, 2010.
- A pipe fitter on disability, Bruce Whitelaw focused on senior care, saying that it was an issue that "lit my fire.... We're not maintaining their dignity." On October 15, 2010, Whitelaw announced that he would step down from the campaign and throw his support behind incumbent Terry Whitehead.

=== Ward Nine (Heritage Stoney Creek) ===
Summary of the October 25, 2010 Hamilton, Ontario Ward Nine councillor election
Candidate	Popular vote		
Candidate	Votes	%	±%
Brad Clark (incumbent)	3,454	45.33%	-5.59
Nancy Fiorentino	2,343	30.75%	n/a
Geraldine McMullen	999	13.11%	n/a
Andrew Mowatt	824	10.81%	n/a
Total votes	7743	100%	
Registered voters	19,235	40.3%	+3.16%
Note: All Hamilton municipal elections are officially non-partisan. Note: Candidate campaign colours are based on the prominent colour used in campaign items (signs, literature, etc.) and are used as a visual differentiation between candidates.
Sources: Hamilton, Ontario, City Clerk's Office Archived 2010-08-20 at the Wayback Machine

- Brad Clark, the first-term incumbent councillor, sought a second term.
- Nancy Fiorentino was a local resident who worked for the Town of Oakville.
- Geraldine McMullen was a representative with Canadian Office and Professional Employees Union, Local 343.
- Former Olympian and police officer Andrew Mowatt ran for the first time.

=== Ward Ten (Stoney Creek) ===
Summary of the October 25, 2010 Hamilton, Ontario Ward Ten councillor election
Candidate	Popular vote		
Candidate	Votes	%	±%
Maria Pearson (incumbent)	5,464	63.85%	-11.22%
Bernard Josipovic	1,995	23.31%	n/a
Jose Pablo Bustamante	1,098	12.83%	n/a
Total votes	8,772	100%	
Registered voters	19,350	45.33%	+4.01%
Note: All Hamilton municipal elections are officially non-partisan. Note: Candidate campaign colours are based on the prominent colour used in campaign items (signs, literature, etc.) and are used as a visual differentiation between candidates.
Sources: Hamilton, Ontario, City Clerk's Office Archived 2010-08-20 at the Wayback Machine

- IT entrepreneur Jose Pablo Bustamante filed papers to run in Ward 10, saying, "New people need to come to city council and new ideas have to flow."
- Bernard Josipovic, a former employee for local radio station Y108, as well as both of Hamilton's steel manufacturers, Stelco and Dofasco, filed on June 3.
- Maria Pearson, two term Ward 10 councillor sought a third mandate.

=== Ward Eleven (Glanbrook-Winona) ===
Summary of the October 25, 2010 Hamilton, Ontario Ward Eleven councillor election
Candidate	Popular vote		
Candidate	Votes	%	±%
Brenda Johnson	4,410	42.12%	n/a
David Mitchell (incumbent)	4,165	39.78%	-20.26%
Ken Chartrand	1,896	18.11%	n/a
Total votes	10,676	100%	
Registered voters	24,655	43.30%	+3.04%
Note: All Hamilton municipal elections are officially non-partisan. Note: Candidate campaign colours are based on the prominent colour used in campaign items (signs, literature, etc.) and are used as a visual differentiation between candidates.
Sources: Hamilton, Ontario, City Clerk's Office Archived 2010-08-20 at the Wayback Machine

- Ken Chartrand was a first time candidate, who said in an interview with The Hamiltonian, "It is time for a new representative with a strong ear who listens and has vast knowledge of all the communities and will represent all the people."
- Brenda Johnson, a Winona resident and member of Environment Hamilton notable for her activism in persuading the city to avoid a Wal-Mart power centre development in her town, stood for the first time.
- Controversial councillor Dave Mitchell sought another term on city council in the wake of his censure by his peers in 2008.

=== Ward Twelve (Ancaster) ===
Summary of the October 25, 2010 Hamilton, Ontario Ward Twelve councillor election
Candidate	Popular vote		
Candidate	Votes	%	±%
Lloyd Ferguson (incumbent)	7,447	73.28%	+31.89%
Brenda Cox-Graham	2,716	26.72%	n/a
Total votes	8279	100%	
Registered voters	20,767	40.7%	+2.29%
Note: All Hamilton municipal elections are officially non-partisan. Note: Candidate campaign colours are based on the prominent colour used in campaign items (signs, literature, etc.) and are used as a visual differentiation between candidates.
Sources: Hamilton, Ontario, City Clerk's Office Archived 2010-08-20 at the Wayback Machine

- Brenda Cox-Graham was an Ancaster-based lawyer who had contributed to major international legal journals.
- Ancaster councillor Lloyd Ferguson, despite considering a mayoral run, decided to run for a second term.

=== Ward Thirteen (Dundas) ===
Russ Powers, the incumbent councillor and former Liberal MP for Ancaster—Dundas—Flamborough—Westdale, sought another term on council. Aside from a two-year period, Powers had served in local elected office since 1982. Powers' message during the campaign and to local media was simple, though light on policy specifics. When asked about his platform, Powers indicated he was running "To continue to represent the citizens of the community of Dundas to the best of my ability."

Danya Scime, a vocal opponent of the West Harbour Pan Am Games Stadium site, filed to run against Powers on September 8. Scime's campaign focused on growing Dundas' commercial tax base through redeveloping brownfields, protecting greenspace, and improving the city's regulatory process to make by-laws and permits more simple. Ron Tammer was a member of the community active with Dundas Minor Hockey Association and Dundas Minor Baseball Association, as well as working with advocacy groups like the Hamilton Youth Justice Committee and Friends of the Red Hill Valley. Tammer's campaign focused on addressing issues of poverty and more responsible development to protect ecologically-sensitive areas. Glenn Robinson, a life-long Dundas resident, campaigned on broadening the scope of community consultation.

Perennial candidate Marty Zulniak dropped out of the mayoral contest to run against Powers in Ward 13. Zulniak, a Dundas native and local "colourful character", campaigned on a localist platform of supporting the community, telling The Spectator, "infrastructure in this community isn't what it was in the good ole days," and pushing to clean up Spencer Creek.

Candidates for the October 25, 2010 Hamilton, Ontario Ward 13 Councillor Election
Candidate	Popular vote		
Candidate	Votes	%	±%
Russ Powers (incumbent)	4,884	58.92%	+24.59%
Danya Scime	1,761	21.25%	-
Glenn Robinson	758	9.14%	-
Ron Tammer	559	6.74%	-
Marty Zulniak	327	3.94%	-
Total votes	8,450	100%	
Registered voters	18,439	45.83%	+2.39%
Note: All Hamilton municipal elections are officially non-partisan. Note: Candidate campaign colours are based on the prominent colour used in campaign items (signs, literature, etc.) and are used as a visual differentiation between candidates.

=== Ward Fourteen (Jerseyville-Rockton) ===
Summary of the October 25, 2010 Hamilton, Ontario Ward Fourteen councillor election
Candidate	Popular vote		
Candidate	Votes	%	±%
Robert Pasuta (incumbent)	Acclaimed		
Total votes	4,264	100%	
Registered voters	12,147	35.10%	-1.49%
Note: For this election, voter turnout is just for the position of mayor and Catholic school board trustee, in that both councillor and public school board trustee were acclaimed. Note: All Hamilton municipal elections are officially non-partisan. Note: Candidate campaign colours are based on the prominent colour used in campaign items (signs, literature, etc.) and are used as a visual differentiation between candidates.
Sources: Hamilton, Ontario, City Clerk's Office Archived 2010-08-20 at the Wayback Machine

- First-term incumbent councillor Robert Pasuta was acclaimed to a second term when no candidates challenged him by the close of nominations on September 10, 2010.

=== Ward Fifteen (Flamborough) ===
Summary of the October 25, 2010 Hamilton, Ontario Ward Fifteen councillor election
Candidate	Popular vote		
Candidate	Votes	%	±%
Judi Partridge	3,396	52.72%	+11.55%
Neil Bos	2,767	42.95%	n/a
Brian Gaspar	279	4.33%	n/a
Total votes	6,526	100%	
Registered voters	18,609	35.07%	-0.72%
Note: All Hamilton municipal elections are officially non-partisan. Note: Candidate campaign colours are based on the prominent colour used in campaign items (signs, literature, etc.) and are used as a visual differentiation between candidates.
Sources: Hamilton, Ontario, City Clerk's Office Archived 2010-08-20 at the Wayback Machine

- Neil Bos was the owner of Village Fish and Chips in Waterdown.
- Brian Gaspar was the chairman of the Newalta/Hamilton Landfill Liaison Committee, an organization dedicated to opening dialogue concerning the area's local landfill.
- Judi Partridge, who ran in the 2006 election, was the chair of the Hamilton Chamber of Commerce.

== Public school board election ==
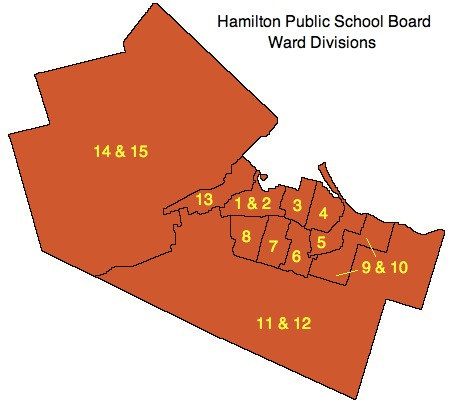
The ward divisions used by the Public School Board

Summary of the October 25, 2010 Hamilton, Ontario Ward One and Two Public School Board trustee election
Candidate	Popular vote		
Candidate	Votes	%	±%
Judith Bishop (incumbent)	Acclaimed		
Total votes	n/a		
Registered voters	n/a		
Note: All Hamilton municipal elections are officially non-partisan. Note: Candidate campaign colours are based on the prominent colour used in campaign items (signs, literature, etc.) and are used as a visual differentiation between candidates.
Sources: Hamilton, Ontario City Clerk's Office

- Trustee Judith Bishop, who had served since 1988, was acclaimed in Wards One and Two.

Summary of the October 25, 2010 Hamilton, Ontario Ward Three Public School Board trustee election
Candidate	Popular vote		
Candidate	Votes	%	±%
Tim Simmons (incumbent)	3,137	74.00%	+34.21%
Steven Paul Denault	1,102	26.00%	n/a
Total votes	5,151	100%	
Registered voters	17,385	29.60%	n/a
Note: All Hamilton municipal elections are officially non-partisan. Note: Candidate campaign colours are based on the prominent colour used in campaign items (signs, literature, etc.) and are used as a visual differentiation between candidates.
Sources: Hamilton, Ontario City Clerk's Office Archived 2010-08-20 at the Wayback Machine

- Sitting trustee Tim Simmons sought re-election.
- Steven Denault ran in Ward 9 in 2006 for the Catholic Board, gaining less than 8% of votes cast.

Summary of the October 25, 2010 Hamilton, Ontario Ward Four Public School Board trustee election
Candidate	Popular vote		
Candidate	Votes	%	±%
Ray E. Mulholland (incumbent)	2,913	48.58%	-10.20%
Cindy Kennedy	1,439	24.49%	n/a
Julian Holland	1,057	17.99%	n/a
Bob Green Innes	466	7.93%	n/a
Total votes	5,875	100%	
Registered voters	18,561	31.65%	n/a
Note: All Hamilton municipal elections are officially non-partisan. Note: Candidate campaign colours are based on the prominent colour used in campaign items (signs, literature, etc.) and are used as a visual differentiation between candidates.
Sources: Hamilton, Ontario City Clerk's Office Archived 2010-08-20 at the Wayback Machine

- Julian Holland was a professor of English and Cultural Studies at McMaster University.
- Bob Green Innes was a professional engineer and former candidate for provincial parliament in Hamilton East—Stoney Creek for the Family Coalition Party.
- Cindy Kennedy, a Delta High School alumnus, worked with People for Education, a non-profit organization that promotes public education.
- Long-time trustee Ray Mulholland stood for re-election.

Summary of the October 25, 2010 Hamilton, Ontario Ward Five Public School Board trustee election
Candidate	Popular vote		
Candidate	Votes	%	±%
Todd White	3,017	49.36%	n/a
Lorri Cooke	1,291	21.12%	n/a
Ron English (incumbent)	1,173	19.19%	-34.56%
Pervez Muhammad	631	10.32%	n/a
Total votes	6,570	100%	
Registered voters	17,597	37.30%	n/a
Note: All Hamilton municipal elections are officially non-partisan. Note: Candidate campaign colours are based on the prominent colour used in campaign items (signs, literature, etc.) and are used as a visual differentiation between candidates.
Sources: Hamilton, Ontario City Clerk's Office Archived 2010-08-20 at the Wayback Machine

- Trustee Ron English filed to run for re-election.
- Todd White was Hamilton East—Stoney Creek New Democrat MPP Paul Miller's executive assistant.
- Pervez Muhammad filed to run on September 6.

Summary of the October 25, 2010 Hamilton, Ontario Ward Six Public School Board trustee election
Candidate	Popular vote		
Candidate	Votes	%	±%
Laura Peddle (incumbent)	3,417	44.74%	+7.19%
Kathy Archer	2,829	37.04%	+0.86%
Jeannie Martel	1,392	18.22%	n/a
Total votes	7,638	100%	
Registered voters	20,338	37.55%	n/a
Note: All Hamilton municipal elections are officially non-partisan. Note: Candidate campaign colours are based on the prominent colour used in campaign items (signs, literature, etc.) and are used as a visual differentiation between candidates.
Sources: Hamilton, Ontario City Clerk's Office Archived 2010-08-20 at the Wayback Machine

- Veteran trustee Laura Peddle ran for another term.
- Contesting the Ward 6 race was Kathy Archer, who ran a very close second to Trustee Peddle in the 2006 election.
- Jeannie Martel was the director of the Hamilton Injured Workers Group board.

Summary of the October 25, 2010 Hamilton, Ontario Ward Seven Public School Board trustee election
Candidate	Popular vote		
Candidate	Votes	%	±%
Lillian Orban (incumbent)	6,121	60.77%	+3.5%
Marlon Picken	3,951	39.23%	n/a
Total votes	11,020	100%	
Registered voters	28,374	38.80%	n/a
Note: All Hamilton municipal elections are officially non-partisan. Note: Candidate campaign colours are based on the prominent colour used in campaign items (signs, literature, etc.) and are used as a visual differentiation between candidates.
Sources: Hamilton, Ontario City Clerk's Office Archived 2010-08-20 at the Wayback Machine

- Sitting trustee Lillian Orban sought re-election.
- Marlon Picken was a local New Democratic activist and member of the Hamilton District Labour Council's Peace and Human Rights Commission.

Summary of the October 25, 2010 Hamilton, Ontario Ward Eight Public School Board trustee election
Candidate	Popular vote		
Candidate	Votes	%	±%
Wes Hicks (incumbent)	5,642	63.38%	+10.25%
Sylvia Thomas	2,089	23.47%	+7.4%
Al Pierce	1,171	13.15%	-17.65%
Total votes	8,902	100%	
Registered voters	22,918	38.8%	+2.6%
Note: All Hamilton municipal elections are officially non-partisan. Note: Candidate campaign colours are based on the prominent colour used in campaign items (signs, literature, etc.) and are used as a visual differentiation between candidates.
Sources: Hamilton, Ontario City Clerk's Office Archived 2010-08-20 at the Wayback Machine

- Incumbent Wes Hicks stood for re-election after a surprise win over former trustee Al Pierce in 2006 .
- Al Pierce was trustee from 2003 to 2006 when he was defeated by current trustee Wes Hicks.
- Sylvia Thomas contested the seat in 2006.

Summary of the October 25, 2010 Hamilton, Ontario Wards Nine and Ten Public School Board trustee election
Candidate	Popular vote		
Candidate	Votes	%	±%
Robert Barlow (incumbent)	4,165	50.29%	+2.75%
John Davidson	2,857	34.5%	-0.69%
Bruce Percy	1,260	15.21%	n/a
Total votes	9,003	100%	
Registered voters	23,717	38%	+7.1%
Note: All Hamilton municipal elections are officially non-partisan. Note: Candidate campaign colours are based on the prominent colour used in campaign items (signs, literature, etc.) and are used as a visual differentiation between candidates.
Sources: Hamilton, Ontario, City Clerk's Office Archived 2010-08-20 at the Wayback Machine

- Sitting trustee Robert Barlow sought re-election.
- John Davidson was trustee from 2003 to 2006 when he was defeated by current trustee Robert Barlow.
- Bruce Percy was a first-time candidate.

Summary of the October 25, 2010 Hamilton, Ontario Wards Eleven and Twelve Public School Board trustee election
Candidate	Popular vote		
Candidate	Votes	%	±%
Alex Johnstone	8,586	66.9%	n/a
Ying Chan	4,249	33.1%	n/a
Total votes	14,692	100%	
Registered voters	35,460	41.4%	+14.35%
Note: All Hamilton municipal elections are officially non-partisan. Note: Candidate campaign colours are based on the prominent colour used in campaign items (signs, literature, etc.) and are used as a visual differentiation between candidates.
Sources: Hamilton, Ontario, City Clerk's Office Archived 2010-08-20 at the Wayback Machine

- Ying Chan was an Ancaster resident and co-founder of Ancaster Parents for French Immersion, a group dedicated to expanding French immersion courses in area schools. Chan was endorsed by fundamentalist Christian organizations, such as the Campaign Life Coalition, Hamilton-Wentworth Family Action Council, and Public Education Advocates for Christian Equity.
- Alex Johnstone was a social worker with a specialization in child welfare. She worked as a child and family support worker for the Vancouver School Board, was a developmental worker for an autistic child, and volunteered with Big Brothers Big Sisters and Free The Children. Johnstone was formally a New Democratic candidate for the Ancaster—Dundas—Flamborough—Westdale riding.

Summary of the October 25, 2010 Hamilton, Ontario Ward Thirteen Public School Board trustee election
Candidate	Popular vote		
Candidate	Votes	%	±%
Jessica Brennan (incumbent)	4,957	81.54%	+2.73%
Klaas Detmar	1,122	18.46%	n/a
Total votes	6,079	100%	
Registered voters	15,146	45.8%	+7.7%
Note: All Hamilton municipal elections are officially non-partisan. Note: Candidate campaign colours are based on the prominent colour used in campaign items (signs, literature, etc.) and are used as a visual differentiation between candidates.
Sources: Hamilton, Ontario, City Clerk's Office Archived 2010-08-20 at the Wayback Machine

- Jessica Brennan, then-chair of the board, sought re-election in her Dundas ward.
- Klaas Detmar was a carpenter-contractor who self-identified as a "Christian" candidate.

Summary of the October 25, 2010 Hamilton, Ontario Wards Fourteen and Fifteen Public School Board trustee election
Candidate	Popular vote		
Candidate	Votes	%	±%
Karen Turkstra (incumbent)	Acclaimed		
Total votes	n/a		
Registered voters	n/a		
Note: All Hamilton municipal elections are officially non-partisan. Note: Candidate campaign colours are based on the prominent colour used in campaign items (signs, literature, etc.) and are used as a visual differentiation between candidates.
Sources: Hamilton, Ontario, City Clerk's Office

- Karen Turkstra, the incumbent trustee, was acclaimed to another term.

== Catholic school board election ==
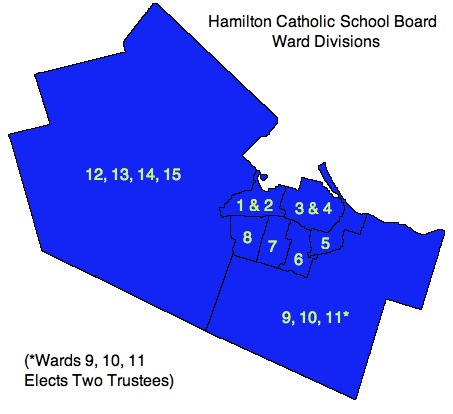
The ward divisions used by the Catholic School Board. Note the allotment of two representatives for Wards 9, 10 and 11.

Summary of the October 25, 2010 Hamilton, Ontario Wards One and Two Catholic School Board trustee election
Candidate	Popular vote		
Candidate	Votes	%	±%
Mark Valvasori	1,171	43.39%	n/a
Paula Linger	768	28.45%	n/a
Louis Agro (incumbent)	760	28.16%	-32.22%
Total votes	2,699	100%	
Registered voters	7,011	42.8%	+10.2%
Note: All Hamilton municipal elections are officially non-partisan. Note: Candidate campaign colours are based on the prominent colour used in campaign items (signs, literature, etc.) and are used as a visual differentiation between candidates.
Sources: Hamilton, Ontario City Clerk's Office Archived 2010-08-20 at the Wayback Machine

- Louis Agro sought re-election for Wards 1 and 2.
- Paula Linger
- Mark Valvasori was a professor at Mohawk College and a football coach at St. Mary's Catholic Secondary School in Ward One.

Summary of the October 25, 2010 Hamilton, Ontario Wards Three and Four Catholic School Board trustee election
Candidate	Popular vote		
Candidate	Votes	%	±%
Ralph Agostino (incumbent)	2,454	66.32%	+10.96%
Brian Nestor	860	23.24%	+13.44%
Calogero Milazzo	386	10.43%	n/a
Total votes	3,700	100%	
Registered voters	10,545	38.8%	+1.9%
Note: All Hamilton municipal elections are officially non-partisan. Note: Candidate campaign colours are based on the prominent colour used in campaign items (signs, literature, etc.) and are used as a visual differentiation between candidates.
Sources: Hamilton, Ontario City Clerk's Office Archived 2010-08-20 at the Wayback Machine

- Incumbent trustee Ralph Agostino sought re-election in Wards 3 and 4.
- Calogero Milazzo
- Brian Nestor

Summary of the October 25, 2010 Hamilton, Ontario Ward Five Catholic School Board trustee election
Candidate	Popular vote		
Candidate	Votes	%	±%
Sam Agostino	1,518	40.94%	+0.59%
Frank Ciotti	1,188	32.04%	n/a
Linda Di Bartolomeo (incumbent)	1,002	27.02%	-17.6%
Total votes	3,708	100%	
Registered voters	7,895	51.1%	+5.3%
Note: All Hamilton municipal elections are officially non-partisan. Note: Candidate campaign colours are based on the prominent colour used in campaign items (signs, literature, etc.) and are used as a visual differentiation between candidates.
Sources: Hamilton, Ontario City Clerk's Office Archived 2010-08-20 at the Wayback Machine

- Sam Agostino
- Former teacher, union president and municipal candidate Frank Ciotti sought election in Ward 5.
- Incumbent trustee Linda DiBartolomeo filed for re-election on September 6.

Summary of the October 25, 2010 Hamilton, Ontario Ward Six Catholic School Board trustee election
Candidate	Popular vote		
Candidate	Votes	%	±%
Kyran Kennedy (incumbent)	1,457	41.77%	Note 1
Michael Ecker	1,392	39.91%	n/a
Nick Pellegrino	639	18.32%	n/a
Total votes	3,488	100%	
Registered voters	7,567	49.9%	n/a
Note 1: Candidate was acclaimed in the previous election. Note: All Hamilton municipal elections are officially non-partisan. Note: Candidate campaign colours are based on the prominent colour used in campaign items (signs, literature, etc.) and are used as a visual differentiation between candidates.
Sources: Hamilton, Ontario City Clerk's Office Archived 2010-08-20 at the Wayback Machine

- Michael Ecker
- The 82-year-old Father Kyran Kennedy, a veteran trustee and former parish priest for St. Margaret Mary, sought another term.
- Nick Pellegrino

Summary of the October 25, 2010 Hamilton, Ontario Ward Seven Catholic School Board trustee election
Candidate	Popular vote		
Candidate	Votes	%	±%
Pat Daly (incumbent)	Acclaimed		
Total votes	n/a		
Registered voters	n/a		
Note: All Hamilton municipal elections are officially non-partisan. Note: Candidate campaign colours are based on the prominent colour used in campaign items (signs, literature, etc.) and are used as a visual differentiation between candidates.
Sources: Hamilton, Ontario City Clerk's Office

- Board chair and sitting trustee Pat Daly was acclaimed to his Mountain seat.

Summary of the October 25, 2010 Hamilton, Ontario Ward Eight Catholic School Board trustee election
Candidate	Popular vote		
Candidate	Votes	%	±%
John Valvasori	2,346	44.65%	n/a
Sergio Manchia (incumbent)	1,826	34.75%	Note 1
Raphael Kolenko	684	13.02%	n/a
Jack Freiburger	398	7.58%	n/a
Total votes	5,254	100%	
Registered voters	10,988	50.5%	n/a
Note 1: Candidate was acclaimed last election. Note: All Hamilton municipal elections are officially non-partisan. Note: Candidate campaign colours are based on the prominent colour used in campaign items (signs, literature, etc.) and are used as a visual differentiation between candidates.
Sources: Hamilton, Ontario City Clerk's Office Archived 2010-08-20 at the Wayback Machine

- John Freiburger joined the race on September 7.
- Raphael Kolenko, a business owner who lives in the ward, filed to run in Ward 8.
- Sergio Manchia was the sitting trustee for Ward 8.
- John Valvasori was the principal of St. Thomas More Catholic Secondary School in Ward 8 from 1997 to 2007, when he retired.

Summary of the October 25, 2010 Hamilton, Ontario Wards Nine, Ten and Eleven Catholic School Board trustee election
Candidate	Popular vote		
Candidate	Votes	%	±%
Mary Nardini (incumbent)	4,788	30.08%	-6.78%
Paul Di Francesco	4,276	26.87%	n/a
Raymond Bartolotti (incumbent)	3,237	30.34%	-6.3%
Anthony Di Brizzi	1,688	10.61%	n/a
Dan Lohin	1,543	9.69%	n/a
Saji Anthony	384	2.41%	n/a
Total votes	15,916	100%	
Registered voters	20,758	50.8%	n/a
Note: This ward elected two Catholic trustees, and percentages are specific to each candidate, not for the overall total. Note: All Hamilton municipal elections are officially non-partisan. Note: Candidate campaign colours are based on the prominent colour used in campaign items (signs, literature, etc.) and are used as a visual differentiation between candidates.
Sources: Hamilton, Ontario City Clerk's Office Archived 2010-08-20 at the Wayback Machine

- Saji Anthony
- Raymond Bartolotti was one of two representatives for Wards 9, 10 and 11.
- Paul DiFrancesco was a principal with the Catholic School Board for 31 years before retiring in July 2010.
- Anthony DiBrizzi was a Stoney Creek resident who filed on July 21, 2010.
- Dan Lohin
- The last two-tier seat left in Hamilton was also represented by trustee Mary Nardini.

Summary of the October 25, 2010 Hamilton, Ontario Wards Twelve, Thirteen, Fourteen and Fifteen Catholic School Board trustee election
Candidate	Popular vote		
Candidate	Votes	%	±%
Carolyn Cornale (incumbent)	3,541	61.07%	-3.81%
Rome D'Angelo	1,772	30.56%	n/a
Dave Parsi-Strecker	485	8.36%	n/a
Total votes	6,176	100%	
Registered voters	14,500	42.6%	+10.4%
Note: All Hamilton municipal elections are officially non-partisan. Note: Candidate campaign colours are based on the prominent colour used in campaign items (signs, literature, etc.) and are used as a visual differentiation between candidates.
Sources: Hamilton, Ontario City Clerk's Office Archived 2010-08-20 at the Wayback Machine

- Rome D'Angelo was the manager of Corporate Buildings and Technical Services for the City of Hamilton.
- Trustee Carolyn Cornale filed to run for re-election for the suburban Wards 12, 13, 14 and 15.
- Dave Parisi-Strecker

== French public school board election ==
Summary of the October 25, 2010 Hamilton, Ontario French Public School Board trustee
Candidate	Popular vote		
Candidate	Votes	%	±%
Micheline Wylde (incumbent)	Acclaimed		
Total votes	n/a		
Registered voters	n/a		
Note: All Hamilton municipal elections are officially non-partisan. Note: Candidate campaign colours are based on the prominent colour used in campaign items (signs, literature, etc.) and are used as a visual differentiation between candidates.
Sources: Hamilton, Ontario City Clerk's Office

- Micheline Wylde was the incumbent trustee.

== French Catholic school board election ==
Summary of the October 25, 2010 election to the office of trustee for Le Conseil Scolaire de district du Catholique Centre-sud
Candidate	Popular vote		
Candidate	Votes	%	±%
Marcel Levesque (incumbent)	Acclaimed		
Total votes	n/a		
Registered voters	n/a		
Note: All Hamilton municipal elections are officially non-partisan. Note: Candidate campaign colours are based on the prominent colour used in campaign items (signs, literature, etc.) and are used as a visual differentiation between candidates.
Sources: Hamilton, Ontario City Clerk's Office

- Marcel Levesque was the incumbent trustee.

== Endorsements ==
Endorsements from local media
Publication	Candidate	Elected	
Publication	Candidate	Yes	No
The Hamilton Spectator	Fred Eisenberger		
Sources: Elliot, Howard. "The right man for the job," Hamilton Spectator, October 10, 2010, Editorial, A15.

Endorsements from the Campaign Life Coalition
Candidate	Seat contested	Endorsement	Elected	
Candidate	Seat contested	Endorsement	Yes	No
Gino Spezalie	Mayor	Supportable		
Total supportable mayoral candidates		1	0	1
Total supportable council candidates		0	0	0
Bob Green Innes	Public trustee, Ward 4	Supportable		
Kathy Archer	Public trustee, Ward 6	Supportable		
Lillian Orban	Public trustee, Ward 7	Supportable		
Al Pierce	Public trustee, Ward 8	Supportable		
John Davidson	Public trustee, Ward 9 & 10	Supportable		
Ying Chang	Public trustee, Ward 11 & 12	Supportable		
Klaas Detmar	Public trustee, Ward 13	Supportable		
Total supportable public trustee candidates		7	1	6
Ralph Agostino	Catholic trustee, Wards 3 & 4	Supportable		
Kyran Kennedy	Catholic trustee, Ward 6	Supportable		
Nick Pellegrino	Catholic trustee, Ward 6	Supportable		
Pat Daly	Catholic trustee, Ward 7	Supportable		
Sergio Manchia	Catholic trustee, Ward 8	Supportable		
John Valvasori	Catholic trustee, Ward 8	Supportable		
Raymond Bartolotti	Catholic trustee, Wards 9, 10 & 11	Supportable		
Carolyn Cornale	Catholic trustee, Wards 12, 13, 14 & 15	Supportable		
Rome D'Angelo	Catholic trustee, Wards 12, 13, 14 & 15	Supportable		
Total supportable Catholic trustee candidates		9	5	4
Total supportable candidates		17	6	11
Total not supportable mayoral candidates		0	0	0
Brian McHattie	Councillor, Ward 1	Not supportable		
Total not supportable council candidates		1	1	0
Judith Bishop	Public trustee, Wards 1 & 2	Not supportable		
Tim Simmons	Public trustee, Ward 3	Not supportable		
Ray Mulholland	Public trustee, Ward 4	Not supportable		
Ronald English	Public trustee, Ward 5	Not supportable		
Laura Peddle	Public trustee, Ward 6	Not supportable		
Marlon Picken	Public trustee, Ward 7	Not supportable		
Wes Hicks	Public trustee, Ward 8	Not supportable		
Robert Barlow	Public trustee, Wards 9 & 10	Not supportable		
Jessica Brennan	Public trustee, Ward 13	Not supportable		
Karen Turkstra	Public trustee, Ward 13	Not supportable		
Total not supportable public trustee candidates		10	8	2
John Freiberger	Catholic trustee, Ward 8	Not supportable		
Total not supportable Catholic trustee candidates		1	0	1
Total not supportable candidates		12	9	3
Sources: Campaign Life Coalition. "Crucial moment for voter participation", Updated April, 2009. Accessed June 19, 2012.

Endorsements from the Hamilton and District Labour Council
Candidate	Seat contested	Elected	
Candidate	Seat contested	Yes	No
Fred Eisenberger	Mayor		
Total endorsed mayoral candidates	1	0	1
Brian McHattie	Councillor, Ward 1		
Bob Black	Councillor, Ward 3		
Sam Merula	Councillor, Ward 4		
Jaswinder Bedi	Councillor, Ward 5		
Scott Duvall	Councillor, Ward 7		
Bruce Whitelaw	Councillor, Ward 8		
Gerladine McMullan	Councillor, Ward 9		
Brenda Johnstone	Councillor, Ward 11		
Ron Trammer	Councillor, Ward 13		
Total endorsed council candidates	9	4	5
Tim Simmons	Public trustee, Ward 3		
Jeannie Martel	Public trustee, Ward 6		
Marlon Picken	Public trustee, Ward 7		
Wes Hicks	Public trustee, Ward 8		
Robert Barlow	Public trustee, Wards 9 & 10		
Alex Johnstone	Public trustee, Wards 11 & 12		
Jessica Brennan	Public trustee, Ward 13		
Total endorsed public trustee candidates	7	5	2
Total endorsed candidates	17	9	8
Sources: "Labour council looks to change politicians", Hamilton Mountain News, October 14, 2010.

== Incumbents not seeking election ==
The only incumbent councillor to not seek re-election was Ward 15 representative Margaret McCarthy, who decided not to stand for re-election after serving on regional and Hamilton councils since 1994. She cited family commitment as her reason for leaving politics after 16 years.

Wards 11 and 12 Public School Board trustee Shirley Glauser announced she would not be seeking re-election following the completion of her first term in office. Glauser was the only public trustee to not seek another mandate in 2010.

== Withdrawn candidates ==
Despite placing second in the 2006 election and filing early in 2010 to run against Councillor Russ Powers in Ward 13, Julia Kollek withdrew her candidacy on June 3, 2010, stating that she wanted to help her community in ways other than as an elected representative. During an interview with the Dundas Star, she commented that "You can't take the activist out of me!"

Ward Three candidate and member of the Mohawk College faculty Frank Bedek pulled out of the five-person race on July 20, 2010.

Public school board trustee candidate for Ward 4 Ryan Sparrow withdrew from that race in June. He had been a school board candidate in Ward 3 during the 2006 election, taking 17% of the vote, and was a candidate in the 2008 Federal election for Hamilton Centre.

== Timeline ==
- November 13, 2006: 2006 election
- January 25, 2007: Shortly after the election, Councillor Morelli is accused of harassment, but council votes to stop proceedings.
- April 11, 2007: After weeks of unruliness, Councillor Bratina throws a pen across the council chamber, leading Hamiltonians to believe that Mayor Eisenberger no longer has control of council.
- November 28, 2007: Councillors are unaware of what they are voting on, as they vote to limit the number of garbage bags that will be collected during curbside pickups to one.
- February 5, 2008: Councillor Pasuta alleges that Councillor Mitchell illegally has lobbied him to support a land severance ruling on Mitchell's farm in Glanbrook. Mitchell denies any wrongdoing.
- February 13, 2008: Council votes to censure Councillor Mitchell for the second time in three years. This means he will no longer be able to hold a committee chair or vice chair position for the rest of his term.
- February 15, 2008: The Hamilton Spectator's editorial board calls for Councillor Mitchell to resign after the land-severance scandal. As of December 2008, he remains on council.
- July 11, 2008: Former MP Ian Deans announces he is considering seeking election in any of the city's wards in the 2010 election if his Parkinson's has not incapacitated him.
- April 11, 2009: Sam Merulla, in a Hamilton Spectator article about his career, announces his intentions to run for re-election in Ward 4.
- November 30, 2009: Councillor Ferguson becomes the first councillor to say he is considering a run against Fred Eisenberger for mayor.
- January 1, 2010: Councillor Tom Jackson openly muses about running for mayor while fellow Mountain Councillors Scott Duvall and Terry Whitehead announce their intent to seek re-election in Wards 7 and 8 respectively.
- January 4, 2010: Jose Bustamante and Scott Duvall file their nomination papers to run for city council in Wards 10 and 7 respectively, on the day that nominations open.
- January 8, 2010: Michael Baldasaro becomes the first candidate to register in the mayoral race.
- May 18, 2010: Andrew Hines files to run for mayor.
- May 31, 2010: Mayor Eisenberger files for re-election.
- June 3, 2010: Julia Kollek, after filing to run in Ward 13 earlier in the year, withdraws her candidacy, leaving Councillor Russ Powers the only candidate in Dundas.
- June 7, 2010: Glenn Hamilton files for the mayoral race, bringing the number of candidates to five.
- June 22, 2010: Ryan Sparrow, public school board trustee candidate for Ward 4, withdraws from the race. Sparrow had been a school board candidate in Ward 3 during the 2006 election, taking 17% of the vote, and was a candidate in the 2008 federal election for Hamilton Centre.
- July 20, 2010: Blogger Edward Graydon files to run for mayor, bringing the total number of candidates to six. Former mayor Larry Di Ianni is widely speculated to announce his intention later in the week.
- July 26, 2010: Former Mayor Larry Di Ianni announces his candidacy for the position of mayor. In an interview with the Spectator, he says that he "has learned some political lessons, but also has seen the community, and the importance of council, from a different perspective."
- July 30, 2010: Joke candidate from 2006, Marty Zulinack, files to run for mayor. Eight candidates now vie for the seat.
- August 10, 2010: Earl Basse, the city's integrity commissioner, clears Ward 8 Councillor Terry Whitehead of all harassment allegations brought against him by a former employee. In response to the investigation, Basse provided recommendations for the hiring of administrative assistants that included "developing minimum standards of education and experience for executive assistants; that an orientation package be provided for new assistants; and that a management training program for new councillors be included in their training." Later in the day, after a marathon council session, City Council votes 12 - 3 in favour of the West Harbour location for the city's Pan Am Games stadium.
- August 18, 2010: Local lawyer Pasquale Filice is the ninth local resident to file for the mayor's race. With just over two weeks before the end of nominations, six sitting councillors, six sitting public school board trustees and five Catholic school board trustees remain without challengers.
- August 25, 2010: Farmer Victor Veri becomes the tenth candidate for mayor as Councillor Bernie Morelli files for his seventh election since 1991.
- September 2, 2010: Former New Democratic MP and MPP Ian Deans files to run for mayor among a host of others, who collectively bring the total number of candidates to 13.
- September 3, 2010: Downtown councillor Bob Bratina announces his intention to stand for mayor on his morning radio show, saying that he will have officially filed and left his job at CHML by the September 10 deadline.
- September 10, 2010: Nominations close.
- October 25, 2010: Election day

== See also ==
- List of Hamilton, Ontario, municipal elections
