= 2003 Hamilton, Ontario, municipal election =

Municipal election

2003 Hamilton municipal election
- November 13, 2003
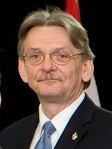
Candidate	Larry Di Ianni	David Christopherson
Popular vote	70,539	54,298
Percentage	50.92%	39.20%
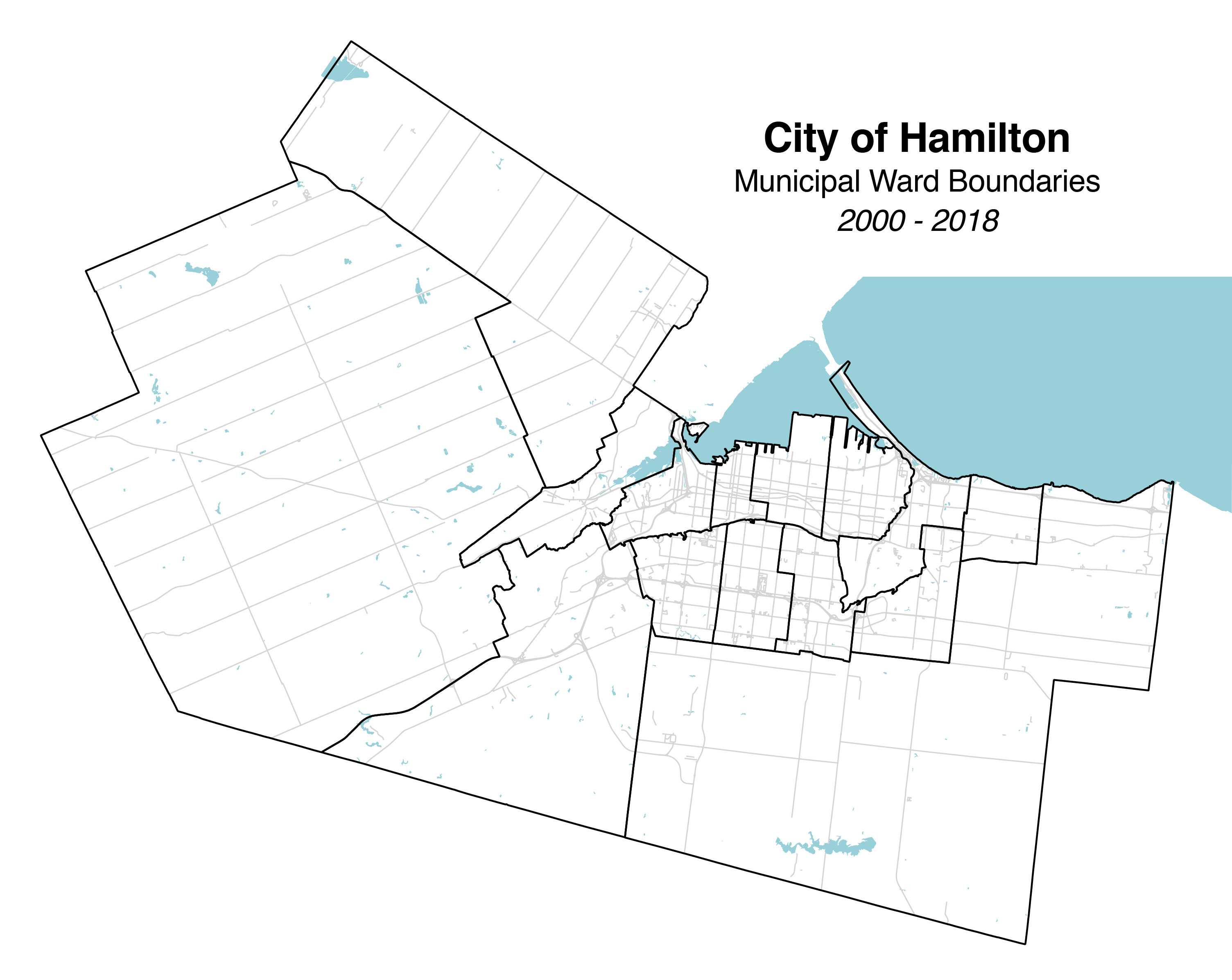
- The ward boundaries used for the 2003 municipal election
Mayor before election
Bob Wade
Elected mayor
Larry Di Ianni

The 2003 Hamilton municipal election was held on November 10, 2003, to elect municipal officials in Hamilton, Ontario. On election day, Hamiltonians elected a mayor, 15 city councillors, and trustees for the Hamilton-Wentworth District School Board, Hamilton-Wentworth Catholic District School Board, Conseil scolaire Viamonde, and Conseil scolaire catholique MonAvenir.

== Mayoral election ==
Candidates for the November 10, 2003 Hamilton, Ontario mayoral election
Candidate	Popular vote		
Candidate	Votes	%	±%
Larry DiIanni	70,539	50.92%	-
David Christopherson	54,298	39.20%	-
Dick Wildeman	4,462	3.22%	-
Michael Peters	3,270	2.36%	-
Tom Murray	2,881	2.08%	-
Michael Baldasaro	2,569	1.85%	+0.75%
Matt Jelly	510	0.37%	-
Total votes	139,902	37.97%	
Registered voters	368,480	100%	
Note: All Hamilton municipal elections are officially non-partisan. Note: Candidate campaign colours are based on the prominent colour used in campaign items (signs, literature, etc.) and are used as a visual differentiation between candidates.

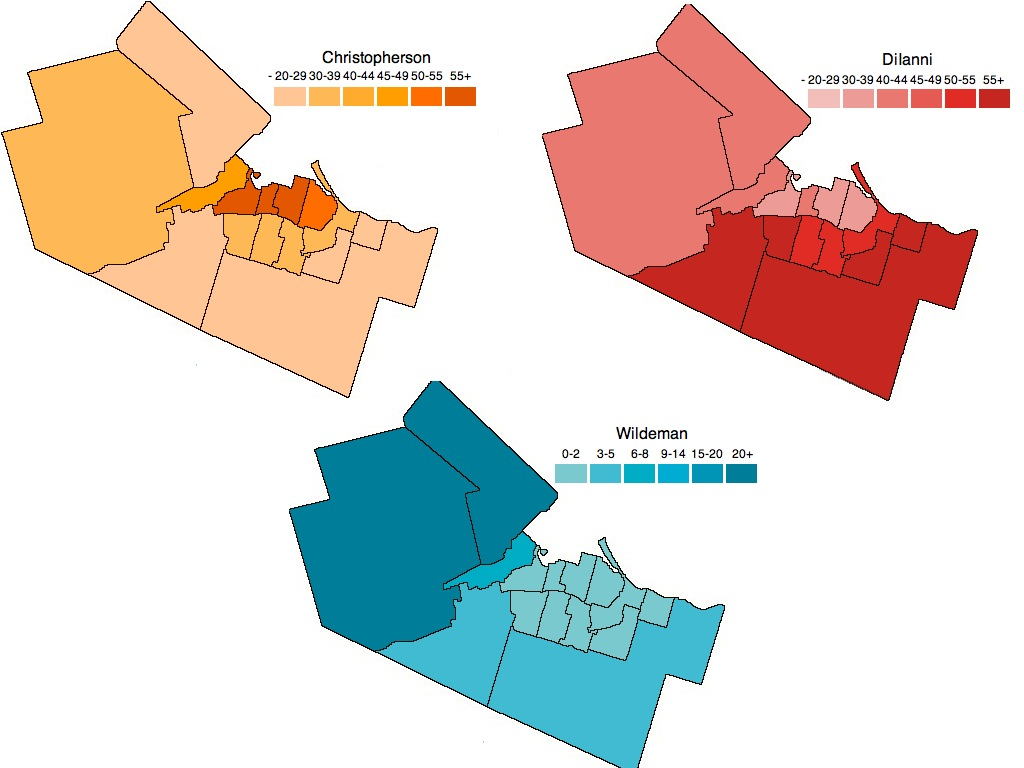
Ward-by-ward percentages for the top three candidates: DiIanni, Christopherson and Wildeman

- Larry Di Ianni was first elected to Stoney Creek city council in 1982, where he served until the 2000 amalgamation of Stoney Creek into Hamilton. He then served as a Hamilton councillor until November 2003. Di Ianni's major policies included the completion of the Red Hill Creek Expressway, business tax reduction, airport development, improving relations among the amalgamated municipalities, and obtaining additional social service funding from the more senior levels of government.
- David Christopherson was elected to Hamilton, Ontario City Council in 1985, where he served until 1990, when he was elected to the Ontario Legislature as a New Democrat, where he served, both in government and opposition, until 2003. During the NDP's tenure in government from 1990 to 1995, Christopherson held the positions of minister of Correctional Services and solicitor-general.
- Dick Wildeman was a 61-year-old PhD in pharmacology, and former director of Pharmaceutical Sciences at McMaster University Medical Centre. He led a de-amalgamation slate in the election, attempting to reverse a 2000 decision by the provincial government to amalgamate Hamilton with the neighbouring municipalities of Dundas, Ancaster, Stoney Creek, Flamborough and Glanbrook. His vision on how to do so, though, attempted to recreate the version of local government utilized in 1975, where rural communities bought services from the Hamilton municipality and contributed to 80% of the cost. Local media berated his plan, saying there was "a troubling lack of clarity in how Wildeman envisions" de-amalgamation and that he "doesn't have what it takes to be mayor of the city of Hamilton," because of "huge disconnects in [his] logic."
- Michael Peters was a 36-year-old first-time candidate and financial controller for a Burlington electrical company at the time of the election. His major campaign planks focused on supporting the Red Hill Creek Expressway, keeping the newly amalgamated suburban communities united with Greater Hamilton and slowing urban sprawl by supporting industrial brownfield development. Peters also lamented the flight of university educated residents from the city, and was quoted as saying, "Of my group of high school friends who went off to university, not one of them lives here, other than me."
- Tom Murray was a 50-year-old electrician at Dofasco and former four-term councillor for Ward 8. During his tenure on council, his aggressive style proved controversial, but he maintained that this would be a strong quality for Hamilton's Mayor to have. His platform included no-tax increases, revitalization of the waterfront, support for the completion of the Red Hill Creek Expressway and ensuring the city focuses on providing essential services while selling off assets like golf courses and entertainment facilities.
- Michael Baldasaro was a perennial candidate and the leader of the Church of the Universe. He stood for Parliament in 1984 and 2000 on a number of different party tickets. In 2003, Baldasaro ran on a platform of monetary rewards for voting, removing City Hall security and legalizing marijuana, prostitution and nudity.
- Matt Jelly was born in Hamilton, and was a 21-year-old visual artist at the time of the election. He did not enter the election to win votes, but to gain experience and draw attention to certain issues. He wanted to give a final decision on amalgamation more time, and opposed the Red Hill Creek Expressway, citing the plan's environmental drawbacks, all while humorously ending his campaign speeches with the line, "Don't vote for me, thank you and good night".

== City council election ==
=== Ward One (Chedoke-Cootes) ===
The race for Ward One councillor was marked by nine-year incumbent councillor Marvin Caplan's faltering support because of a major issue. During the campaign Marvin Caplan openly supported the completion of the Red Hill Creek Expressway, opposed by a majority of Ward One's residents.

Challenger Brian McHattie, who had run for mayor in 1997, was a 43-year-old environmental consultant at the time of the election, and received support due to his opposition to the Red Hill Creek Expressway. Michael Puskas, the third candidate in the race, was a local lawyer who echoed Caplan's support for the expressway.

Candidates for the November 10, 2003 Hamilton, Ontario Ward 1 councillor election
Candidate	Popular vote		
Candidate	Votes	%	±%
Brian McHattie	5,614	57.94%	-
Marvin Caplan (incumbent)	3,043	31.40%	+1.33%
Michael Puskas	1,033	10.66%	-
Total votes	9,879	100%	
Registered voters	25,347	38.98%	
Note: All Hamilton municipal elections are officially non-partisan. Note: Candidate campaign colours are based on the prominent colour used in campaign items (signs, literature, etc.) and are used as a visual differentiation between candidates.

=== Ward Two (Downtown) ===
Candidates for the November 10, 2003 Hamilton, Ontario Ward 2 councillor election
Candidate	Popular vote		
Candidate	Votes	%	±%
Andrea Horwath (incumbent)	4,601	63.81%	+13.7%
James Novak	1,993	27.64%	-
Ronald Berenbaum	325	4.51%	-
Jerry Moore	291	4.04%	-
Total votes	7,443	100%	
Registered voters	26,578	28%	
Note: All Hamilton municipal elections are officially non-partisan. Note: Candidate campaign colours are based on the prominent colour used in campaign items (signs, literature, etc.) and are used as a visual differentiation between candidates.

=== Ward Three (Hamilton Centre) ===
Candidates for the November 10, 2003 Hamilton, Ontario Ward 3 councillor election
Candidate	Popular vote		
Candidate	Votes	%	±%
Bernie Morelli (incumbent)	4,802	67.48%	+8.61%
John Best	2,017	28.34%	-
Robert Westbrook	297	4.17%	-
Total votes	7,410	100%	
Registered voters	29,223	25.36%	
Note: All Hamilton municipal elections are officially non-partisan. Note: Candidate campaign colours are based on the prominent colour used in campaign items (signs, literature, etc.) and are used as a visual differentiation between candidates.

=== Ward Four (East Hamilton) ===
Candidates for the November 10, 2003 Hamilton, Ontario Ward 4 councillor election
Candidate	Popular vote		
Candidate	Votes	%	±%
Sam Merulla (incumbent)	5,015	54.22%	+6.3%
Lynda Lukasik	3,430	37.09%	-
James Byron	668	7.22%	-
Carmen Misale	136	1.47%	-
Total votes	9,366	100%	
Registered voters	27,014	34.67%	
Note: All Hamilton municipal elections are officially non-partisan. Note: Candidate campaign colours are based on the prominent colour used in campaign items (signs, literature, etc.) and are used as a visual differentiation between candidates.

=== Ward Five (Redhill) ===
Candidates for the November 10, 2003 Hamilton, Ontario Ward 5 councillor election
Candidate	Popular vote		
Candidate	Votes	%	±%
Chad Collins (incumbent)	8.077	75.20%	-11.85%
Andrew Schroeder	2,663	24.80%	-
Total votes	10,946	100%	
Registered voters	28,545	38.35%	
Note: All Hamilton municipal elections are officially non-partisan. Note: Candidate campaign colours are based on the prominent colour used in campaign items (signs, literature, etc.) and are used as a visual differentiation between candidates.

=== Ward Six (East Mountain) ===
Candidates for the November 10, 2003 Hamilton, Ontario Ward 6 councillor election
Candidate	Popular vote		
Candidate	Votes	%	±%
Tom Jackson (incumbent)	9.012	74.83%	-13.77%
Kevin Beattie	1,446	12.01%	-
Peter O'Hagan	916	7.61%	-
Shauna McShane	670	6.70%	-
Total votes	12,297	100%	
Registered voters	29,778	41.30%	
Note: All Hamilton municipal elections are officially non-partisan. Note: Candidate campaign colours are based on the prominent colour used in campaign items (signs, literature, etc.) and are used as a visual differentiation between candidates.

=== Ward Seven (Central Mountain) ===
Candidates for the November 10, 2003 Hamilton, Ontario Ward 7 councillor election
Candidate	Popular vote		
Candidate	Votes	%	±%
Bill Kelly (incumbent)	10,699	64.66%	+3.83%
Henry Merling	3,540	21.39%	-
John Gallagher	1,340	8.10%	-
Bill Cottrell	968	5.85%	-
Total votes	16,765	100%	
Registered voters	40,749	41.14%	
Note: All Hamilton municipal elections are officially non-partisan. Note: Candidate campaign colours are based on the prominent colour used in campaign items (signs, literature, etc.) and are used as a visual differentiation between candidates.

=== Ward Eight (West Mountain) ===
Candidates for the November 10, 2003 Hamilton, Ontario Ward 8 councillor election
Candidate	Popular vote		
Candidate	Votes	%	±%
Terry Whitehead	4,135	27.13%	-
Jamie West	3,816	24.62%	-
George Morasse	3,081	20.22%	+5.41%
Peter Martin	2,280	14.96%	-
Naseem Jamil	978	6.42%	-
Roman Sarachman	789	5.18%	-
Wayne Boychuk	160	1.05%	-0.45%
Total votes	15,501	100%	
Registered voters	34,607	44.79%	
Note: All Hamilton municipal elections are officially non-partisan. Note: Candidate campaign colours are based on the prominent colour used in campaign items (signs, literature, etc.) and are used as a visual differentiation between candidates.

=== Ward Nine (Upper Stoney Creek) ===
Candidates for the November 10, 2003 Hamilton, Ontario Ward 9 councillor election
Candidate	Popular vote		
Candidate	Votes	%	±%
Phil Bruckler	3,946	53.80%	-
Anne Bain (incumbent)	3,032	41.34%	+5.56%
Tim Riach	192	2.62%	-
Abe Din	164	2.25%	-
Total votes	7,521	100%	
Registered voters	18,614	40.41%	
Note: All Hamilton municipal elections are officially non-partisan. Note: Candidate campaign colours are based on the prominent colour used in campaign items (signs, literature, etc.) and are used as a visual differentiation between candidates.

=== Ward Ten (Lower Stoney Creek) ===
Candidates for the November 10, 2003 Hamilton, Ontario Ward 10 councillor election
Candidate	Popular vote		
Candidate	Votes	%	±%
Maria Pearson	3,322	36.97%	+4.76%
John Santarelli	2,659	29.59%	-
Louie Milojevic	1,322	14.71%	-
Robert Barlow	1,016	11.31%	-
Jim Davis	419	4.66%	-
Jeff Corradetti	247	2.75%	-
Total votes	9,141	100%	
Registered voters	19,798	46.17%	
Note: All Hamilton municipal elections are officially non-partisan. Note: Candidate campaign colours are based on the prominent colour used in campaign items (signs, literature, etc.) and are used as a visual differentiation between candidates.

=== Ward Eleven (Glanbrook Winona) ===
Candidates for the November 10, 2003 Hamilton, Ontario Ward 11 councillor election
Candidate	Popular vote		
Candidate	Votes	%	±%
David Mitchell (incumbent)	Acclaimed		
Total votes	6,768	100%	
Registered voters	18,082	37.43%	
Note: For this election, voter-turnout is just for the position of mayor and school board trustees in that the councillor's position was acclaimed. Note: All Hamilton municipal elections are officially non-partisan. Note: Candidate campaign colours are based on the prominent colour used in campaign items (signs, literature, etc.) and are used as a visual differentiation between candidates.

=== Ward Twelve (Ancaster) ===
Candidates for the November 10, 2003 Hamilton, Ontario Ward 12 councillor election
Candidate	Popular vote		
Candidate	Votes	%	±%
Murray Ferguson (incumbent)	5,967	69.03%	+16.6%
Bryan Kerman	2,677	30.97%	+5.01%
Total votes	8,816	100%	
Registered voters	20,924	42.13%	
Note: All Hamilton municipal elections are officially non-partisan. Note: Candidate campaign colours are based on the prominent colour used in campaign items (signs, literature, etc.) and are used as a visual differentiation between candidates.

=== Ward Thirteen (Dundas) ===
Candidates for the November 10, 2003 Hamilton, Ontario Ward 13 councillor election
Candidate	Popular vote		
Candidate	Votes	%	±%
Russ Powers (incumbent)	5,184	71.39%	+12.92%
David Longo	2,078	28.81%	-
Total votes	7,544	100%	
Registered voters	18,635	40.48%	
Note: All Hamilton municipal elections are officially non-partisan. Note: Candidate campaign colours are based on the prominent colour used in campaign items (signs, literature, etc.) and are used as a visual differentiation between candidates.

=== Ward Fourteen (Wentworth) ===
Candidates for the November 10, 2003 Hamilton, Ontario Ward 14 councillor election
Candidate	Popular vote		
Candidate	Votes	%	±%
Dave Braden (incumbent)	2,350	50.92%	+3.49%
Don Robertson	2,265	49.08%	-
Total votes	4,662	100%	
Registered voters	12,519	37.24%	
Note: All Hamilton municipal elections are officially non-partisan. Note: Candidate campaign colours are based on the prominent colour used in campaign items (signs, literature, etc.) and are used as a visual differentiation between candidates.

=== Ward Fifteen (Flamborough) ===
Candidates for the November 10, 2003 Hamilton, Ontario Ward 15 councillor election
Candidate	Popular vote		
Candidate	Votes	%	±%
Margaret McCarthy (incumbent)	2,924	50.43%	-7.24%
Arend Kersten	2,346	40.46%	+14.4% (Note 1)
Richard Sams	440	7.59%	-
Stan Johnson	88	1.52%	-
Total votes	5,843	100%	
Registered voters	18,067	32.34%	
Note 1: Total is compared with Kersten's percentage in Ward 14 in 2000. Note: All Hamilton municipal elections are officially non-partisan. Note: Candidate campaign colours are based on the prominent colour used in campaign items (signs, literature, etc.) and are used as a visual differentiation between candidates.

== Public school board election ==
The 2003 election for trustees to the Hamilton-Wentworth District School Board was marked by numerous acclamations, despite the board being put under provincial supervision from August 2002 to October 2003 for failing to pass a balanced budget. A provincial report critiqued trustees and the supervisor placed in charge of the board accused trustees of being "parent advocates, rather than system leaders".

Candidates for the November 10, 2003 Hamilton, Ontario Ward One and Two public school board trustee election
Candidate	Popular vote		
Candidate	Votes	%	±%
Judith Bishop (incumbent)	Acclaimed		
Total votes			
Registered voters			
Note: All Hamilton municipal elections are officially non-partisan. Note: Candidate campaign colours are based on the prominent colour used in campaign items (signs, literature, etc.) and are used as a visual differentiation between candidates.

Candidates for the November 10, 2003 Hamilton, Ontario Ward Three Public School Board Trustee Election
Candidate	Popular vote		
Candidate	Votes	%	±%
Eleanor Johnstone	3,129	72.41%	-
Jean Lewis Knight	1,192	27.59%	-
Total votes	4,321		
Registered voters			
Note: All Hamilton municipal elections are officially non-partisan. Note: Candidate campaign colours are based on the prominent colour used in campaign items (signs, literature, etc.) and are used as a visual differentiation between candidates.

Candidates for the November 10, 2003 Hamilton, Ontario Ward Four Public School Board Trustee Election
Candidate	Popular vote		
Candidate	Votes	%	±%
Ray Mulholland (incumbent)	Acclaimed		
Total votes			
Registered voters			
Note: All Hamilton municipal elections are officially non-partisan. Note: Candidate campaign colours are based on the prominent colour used in campaign items (signs, literature, etc.) and are used as a visual differentiation between candidates.

Candidates for the November 10, 2003 Hamilton, Ontario Ward Five Public School Board Trustee Election
Candidate	Popular vote		
Candidate	Votes	%	±%
Wayne Marston (incumbent)	Acclaimed		
Total votes			
Registered voters			
Note: All Hamilton municipal elections are officially non-partisan. Note: Candidate campaign colours are based on the prominent colour used in campaign items (signs, literature, etc.) and are used as a visual differentiation between candidates.

Candidates for the November 10, 2003 Hamilton, Ontario Ward Six Public School Board Trustee Election
Candidate	Popular vote		
Candidate	Votes	%	±%
Kathy Archer	3,267	45.38%	-
Laura Peddle (incumbent)	3,202	44.48%	-
Alan Zill	730	10.14%	-
Total votes	7,199		
Registered voters			
Note: All Hamilton municipal elections are officially non-partisan. Note: Candidate campaign colours are based on the prominent colour used in campaign items (signs, literature, etc.) and are used as a visual differentiation between candidates.

Candidates for the November 10, 2003 Hamilton, Ontario Ward Seven Public School Board Trustee Election
Candidate	Popular vote		
Candidate	Votes	%	±%
Lillian Orban (incumbent)	6,103	60.62%	-
Mark-Alan Whittle	2,235	22.20%	-
Alex Colic	1,729	17.17%	-
Total votes	10,067		
Registered voters			
Note: All Hamilton municipal elections are officially non-partisan. Note: Candidate campaign colours are based on the prominent colour used in campaign items (signs, literature, etc.) and are used as a visual differentiation between candidates.

Candidates for the November 10, 2003 Hamilton, Ontario Ward Eight Public School Board Trustee Election
Candidate	Popular vote		
Candidate	Votes	%	±%
Al Pierce	4,767	55.55%	-
Sylvia Thomas	3,814	44.45%	-
Total votes	8,581		
Registered voters			
Note: All Hamilton municipal elections are officially non-partisan. Note: Candidate campaign colours are based on the prominent colour used in campaign items (signs, literature, etc.) and are used as a visual differentiation between candidates.

Candidates for the November 10, 2003 Hamilton, Ontario Ward Nine and Ten Public School Board Trustee Election
Candidate	Popular vote		
Candidate	Votes	%	±%
John Davidson	5,111	64.48%	-
Dave Murphy	2,815	35.52%	-
Total votes	7,926		
Registered voters			
Note: All Hamilton municipal elections are officially non-partisan. Note: Candidate campaign colours are based on the prominent colour used in campaign items (signs, literature, etc.) and are used as a visual differentiation between candidates.

Candidates for the November 10, 2003 Hamilton, Ontario Ward Eleven and Twelve Public School Board Trustee Election
Candidate	Popular vote		
Candidate	Votes	%	±%
Ian Thompson	4,650	51.82%	-
Jim Enos	3,031	33.78%	-
Kenneth Audziss	1,293	14.41%	-
Total votes	8,974		
Registered voters			
Note: All Hamilton municipal elections are officially non-partisan. Note: Candidate campaign colours are based on the prominent colour used in campaign items (signs, literature, etc.) and are used as a visual differentiation between candidates.

Candidates for the November 10, 2003 Hamilton, Ontario Ward Thirteen Public School Board Trustee Election
Candidate	Popular vote		
Candidate	Votes	%	±%
Jessica Brennan	3,145	57.41%	-
Mark Coakley	1,850	33.77%	-
Derek Kerr	483	8.82%	-
Total votes	5,478		
Registered voters			
Note: All Hamilton municipal elections are officially non-partisan. Note: Candidate campaign colours are based on the prominent colour used in campaign items (signs, literature, etc.) and are used as a visual differentiation between candidates.

Candidates for the November 10, 2003 Hamilton, Ontario Ward Fourteen Public School Board Trustee Election
Candidate	Popular vote		
Candidate	Votes	%	±%
Reg Woodworth (incumbent)	Acclaimed		
Total votes			
Registered voters			
Note: All Hamilton municipal elections are officially non-partisan. Note: Candidate campaign colours are based on the prominent colour used in campaign items (signs, literature, etc.) and are used as a visual differentiation between candidates.

== Catholic School Board election ==
Candidates for the 10 November 2003 Hamilton-Wentworth Catholic District School Board Wards 1 and 2 trustee election
Candidate	Popular vote		
Candidate	Votes	%	±%
Lewis Agro	1,160	38.1%	-
John Lewis	969	31.8%	-
Joe Barbera	667	21.9%	-
Branko Radisic	251	8.2%	-
Total votes	3,047		
Registered voters			
Note: All Hamilton municipal elections are officially non-partisan. Note: Candidate campaign colours are based on the prominent colour used in campaign items (signs, literature, etc.) and are used as a visual differentiation between candidates.

Candidates for the 10 November 2003 Hamilton-Wentworth Catholic District School Board Wards 3 and 4 trustee election
Candidate	Popular vote		
Candidate	Votes	%	±%
Ralph Agostino	Acclaimed		
Total votes			
Registered voters			
Note: All Hamilton municipal elections are officially non-partisan. Note: Candidate campaign colours are based on the prominent colour used in campaign items (signs, literature, etc.) and are used as a visual differentiation between candidates.

Candidates for the 10 November 2003 Hamilton-Wentworth Catholic District School Board Ward 5 trustee election
Candidate	Popular vote		
Candidate	Votes	%	±%
Joseph Baiardo	Acclaimed		
Total votes			
Registered voters			
Note: All Hamilton municipal elections are officially non-partisan. Note: Candidate campaign colours are based on the prominent colour used in campaign items (signs, literature, etc.) and are used as a visual differentiation between candidates.

Candidates for the 10 November 2003 Hamilton-Wentworth Catholic District School Board Ward 6 trustee election
Candidate	Popular vote		
Candidate	Votes	%	±%
Kyran Kennedy	Acclaimed		
Total votes			
Registered voters			
Note: All Hamilton municipal elections are officially non-partisan. Note: Candidate campaign colours are based on the prominent colour used in campaign items (signs, literature, etc.) and are used as a visual differentiation between candidates.

Candidates for the 10 November 2003 Hamilton-Wentworth Catholic District School Board Ward 7 trustee election
Candidate	Popular vote		
Candidate	Votes	%	±%
Pat Daly	Acclaimed		
Total votes			
Registered voters			
Note: All Hamilton municipal elections are officially non-partisan. Note: Candidate campaign colours are based on the prominent colour used in campaign items (signs, literature, etc.) and are used as a visual differentiation between candidates.

Candidates for the 10 November 2003 Hamilton-Wentworth Catholic District School Board Ward 8 trustee election
Candidate	Popular vote		
Candidate	Votes	%	±%
Sergio Manchia	3,574	69%	-
Tom Wigglesworth	1,605	31%	-
Total votes	5,179		
Registered voters			
Note: All Hamilton municipal elections are officially non-partisan. Note: Candidate campaign colours are based on the prominent colour used in campaign items (signs, literature, etc.) and are used as a visual differentiation between candidates.

Candidates for the 10 November 2003 Hamilton-Wentworth Catholic District School Board Wards 9, 10, and 11 trustees election
Candidate	Popular vote		
Candidate	Votes	%	±%
Mary Nardini	5,023	33.1%	
Raymond Bartolotti (incumbent)	3,450	22.8%	
C. D'Angelo	3,253	21.5%	-
R. Menegazzo	2,389	15.8%	-
A. Magnini	1,046	6.9%	-
Total votes			
Registered voters			
^{1} These candidates did not submit official financial statements and were, therefore, ineligible to run in the 2018 municipal election Note: This ward elected two Catholic trustees and percentages are specific to each candidate, not for the overall total. Note: All Hamilton municipal eections are officially non-partisan. Note: Candidate campaign colours are based on the prominent colour used in campaign items (signs, literature, etc.) and are used as a visual differentiation between candidates.

Candidates for the 10 November 2003 Hamilton-Wentworth Catholic District School Board Wards 12, 13, 14, and 15 trustee election
Candidate	Popular vote		
Candidate	Votes	%	±%
Carolyn Cornale	Acclaimed		
Total votes			
Registered voters			
Note: All Hamilton municipal elections are officially non-partisan. Note: Candidate campaign colours are based on the prominent colour used in campaign items (signs, literature, etc.) and are used as a visual differentiation between candidates.

== See also ==
- List of Hamilton, Ontario, municipal elections
