= Church of the Universe =

Cannabis-based religion

Assembly of the Church of the Universe
- Formation: 1969
- Founder: Walter Tucker
- Type: Entheogen religion
- Headquarters: North Hamilton, Ontario, Canada
- Leading member: Michael Baldasaro

The Assembly of the Church of the Universe, an entheogen religion, was established by Walter Tucker in 1969 in the Canadian province of Ontario. The Church uses marijuana as a sacrament and promotes nudity as a demonstration of human honesty.

== Theology ==
The guiding rules of the church are variations on the Golden Rule:

- Do not hurt yourself.
- Do not hurt anyone else.

Although often quoting from the Bible and other scriptures, the church denies a direct connection to Christianity. It also accepts as valid sources of inspiration ancient and modern sources such as the culture of Sumer, pagan holidays of the solstices, Canada Day, the Knights Templar, Chaldeans, Gnostic Gospels and the Desiderata.

Their sacrament is cannabis, and followers are encouraged to smoke it and use hemp products. They draw on accounts in Genesis and associate the Tree of Life with the hemp plant, additionally quoting Psalm 22:30 and Revelation 22:2,14.

Nudity also finds its origins in Genesis, since Adam and Eve were unclothed until they ate from the Tree of Knowledge rather than the Tree of Life. However, members are enjoined to cover their heads on any official occasion or when interacting with government agents. Each person is encouraged to do so as God directs. Nudism is no longer practiced in many communities within the Church of the Universe.

Since all members joining the church are simultaneously considered to be ordained as ministers, there is theoretically no distinction made between "clergy" and "ordinary members". However, founder Walter Tucker and leading member Michael Baldasaro have partially developed a system of structured religious titles derived from Catholic Christianity, such as reverend, archbishop, bishop and abbot.

== Activities ==
Tucker founded the church at a water-filled former quarry in Puslinch, Ontario in Wellington County between Hamilton and Guelph in 1969. After he leased the site for a nominal fee, he renamed it Clearwater Abbey.

Clearwater Abbey's presence in the area was not without controversy, including allegations of noisy ceremonies on the property, the discovery nearby of human remains in 1975, the termination of its lease in 1982, and the final forcible removal of members from the property by police and sheriffs in 1986. An attempt to relocate to a disused foundry, renamed Hempire Village, in Guelph in 1994 met a similar fate. The church is now located in north Hamilton.

Today Clearwater Abbey, in north Flamborough on the border of Puslinch, is known as the environmentally sensitive Fletcher Creek Conservation Area and is owned by Hamilton Region Conservation Authority.

The church's ritual use of cannabis and its occasional practice of nudism has attracted attention from both the media and police. Because of members' regular possession and use of cannabis as a sacrament, legal charges of criminal possession and trafficking in marijuana laid against individual members are a common occurrence.

Frequent court challenges, based on charges or the exercise of political rights, have created an additional pair of intertwined activities: the Legal Self-Defence fund and the University of Universe. Members who defend themselves or others in court are granted degrees from this non-accredited university, the level depending on the level of court involved.

In the past, both Baldasaro and Tucker have utilized political candidacy for various public and party offices as a platform for espousing their religious beliefs.
