= List of Hamilton, Ontario, municipal elections =

The following is a list of articles on municipal elections in the City of Hamilton, Ontario, Canada

== City of Hamilton - pre-amalgamation ==
- 1969 Hamilton, Ontario, municipal election
- 1972 Hamilton, Ontario, municipal election
- 1974 Hamilton, Ontario, municipal election
- 1976 Hamilton, Ontario, municipal election
- 1978 Hamilton, Ontario, municipal election
- 1980 Hamilton, Ontario, municipal election
- 1982 Hamilton, Ontario, municipal election
- 1985 Hamilton, Ontario, municipal election
- 1988 Hamilton, Ontario, municipal election
- 1991 Hamilton, Ontario, municipal election
- 1994 Hamilton, Ontario, municipal election

== New City of Hamilton - post-amalgamation ==
- 1997 Hamilton, Ontario, municipal election
- 2000 Hamilton, Ontario, municipal election
- 2003 Hamilton, Ontario, municipal election
- 2006 Hamilton, Ontario, municipal election
- 2010 Hamilton, Ontario, municipal election
- 2014 Hamilton, Ontario, municipal election
- 2018 Hamilton, Ontario, municipal election
