= 2006 Hamilton, Ontario, municipal election =

Municipal election

2006 Hamilton municipal election
- November 8, 2006
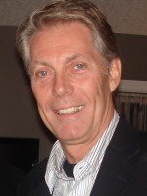
			DE
Candidate	Fred Eisenberger	Larry Di Ianni	Dianne Elms
Popular vote	54,110	53,658	9,459
Percentage	43.21%	42.84%	7.55%
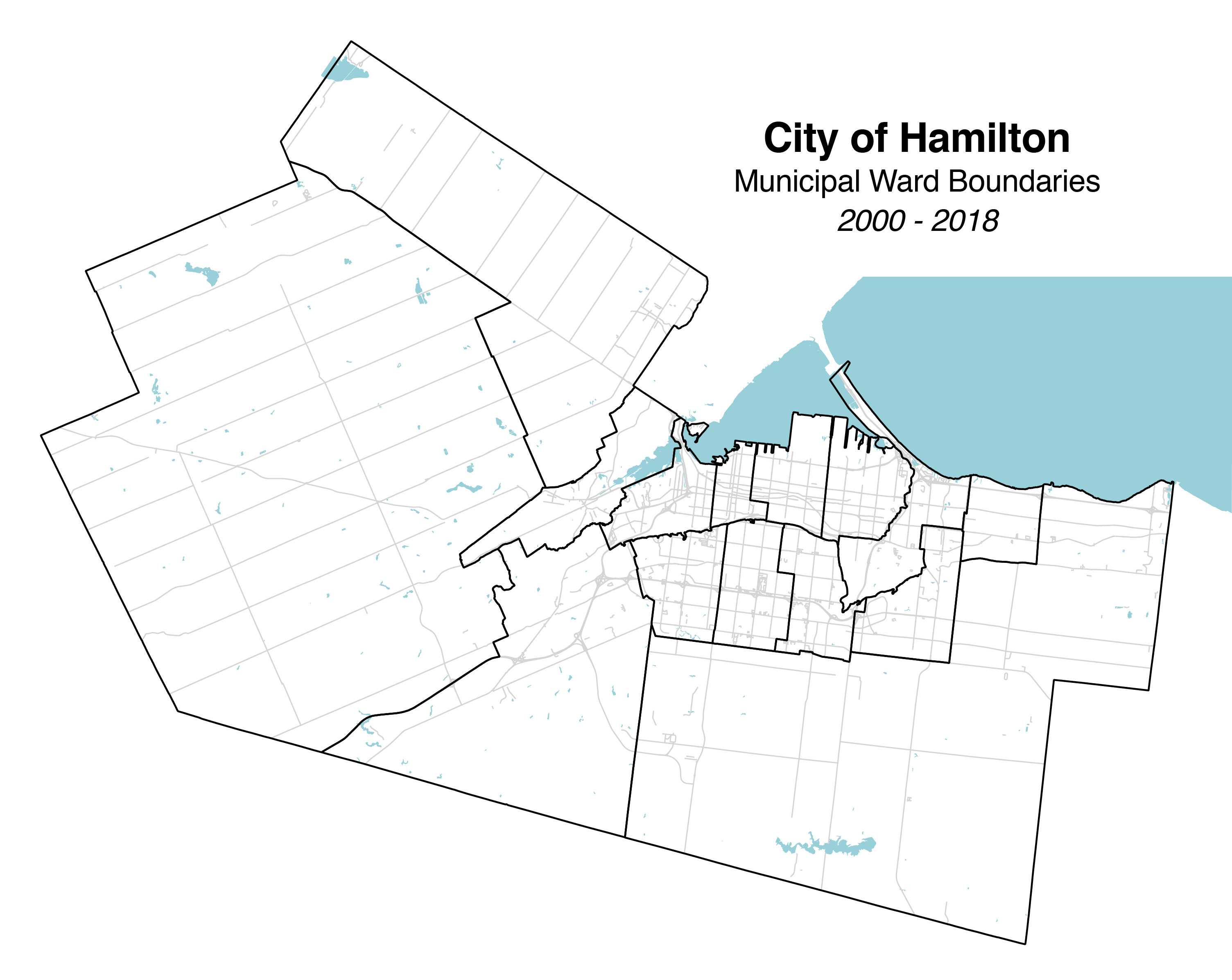
- The ward boundaries used for the 2006 municipal election
Mayor before election
Larry Di Ianni
Elected mayor
Fred Eisenberger

The 2006 Hamilton municipal election was held on November 13, 2006, to elect municipal officials in Hamilton, Ontario. Touted by pundits as being one of the closest mayoral races in Hamilton history, the incumbent Larry Di Ianni was defeated by a margin of 452 votes by Fred Eisenberger.

== Mayoral Election ==
=== Candidates ===
- Michael Baldasaro: Leader of the Church of the Universe and a perennial candidate for office, running for Parliament in 1984, 2000 and 2004, Ward 2 councillor in 2004 and mayor of Hamilton on numerous occasions. His campaign was centered on legalization of marijuana, but he also supported demalgimation and keeping City Hall in Jackson Square.
- Larry Di Ianni: Incumbent mayor of Hamilton. He was involved in a scandal involving his 2003 election campaign and was subsequently charged with violating the Municipal Elections Act. This turned many Hamiltonians against him, and was cited as one of the reasons for his defeat.
- Fred Eisenberger: Former Ward 5 city councillor and chairman of the Hamilton Port Authority. He unsuccessfully ran for mayor in 2000, finishing third behind Bob Wade and Bob Morrow.
- Diane Elms: An iridology practitioner who ran a reform campaign, centered around fiscal mismanagement and lack of voter participation. She stated that, if elected mayor, she would ask in Jesus' name, for God to forgive all those who misused their authority.
- Steve Leach: An unknown candidate. The Hamilton Spectator poked fun at his lack of involvement in an editorial cartoon and commented, "Steve Leach is so fringe, he's out of sight."
- Gino Speziale: A tool and dye maker who ran a very small campaign. At most debates, people found that he supported Elms a majority of the time.
- Martin Zuliniak: A pseudo-joke candidate who associated himself with the Rhinoceros Party, but had a non-joke platform of lower taxes, de-amalgamation and tourism promotion.

=== Results ===
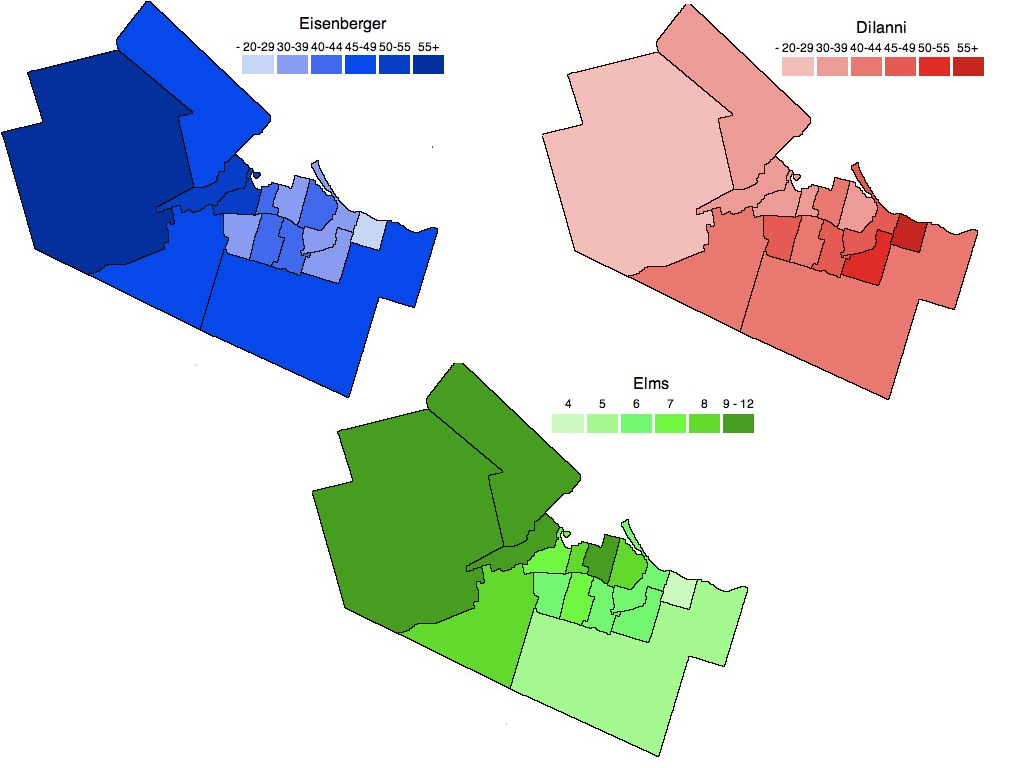
Ward-by-ward percentages for the top three candidates: Eisenberger, DiIanni and Elms

Summary of the November 13, 2006 Hamilton, Ontario mayoral election
Candidate	Popular vote		
Candidate	Votes	%	±%
Fred Eisenberger	54,110	43.21%	n/a
Larry Di Ianni (Incumbent)	53,658	42.84%	−8.08%
Diane Elms	9,459	7.55%	n/a
Michael Baldasaro	4,520	3.61%	+1.76%
Gino Speziale	1,274	1.02	n/a
Steve Leach	1,250	1.00	n/a
Martin S. Zuliniak	968	0.77	n/a
Total votes	126,986	100%	
Registered voters	340,941	37.25%	−0.72%
Note: All Hamilton Municipal Elections are officially non-partisan. Note: Candidate campaign colours are based on the prominent colour used in campaign items (signs, literature, etc.) and are used as a visual differentiation between candidates.
Sources: Hamilton, Ontario, City Clerk's Office Archived 2010-08-20 at the Wayback Machine

== City council elections ==
=== Ward One (Chedoke-Cootes) ===
Summary of the November 13, 2006 Hamilton, Ontario Ward One councillor election
Candidate	Popular vote		
Candidate	Votes	%	±%
Brian McHattie (incumbent)	5,068	62.88%	+4.94%
Tony Greco	2,676	33.20%	-
Fred Spencer	316	3.92%	-
Total votes	8,060	100%	
Registered voters	21,215	37.99%	
Note: All Hamilton Municipal Elections are officially non-partisan. Note: Candidate campaign colours are based on the prominent colour used in campaign items (signs, literature, etc.) and are used as a visual differentiation between candidates.
Sources: Hamilton, Ontario, City Clerk's Office

- Barber Tony Greco presented himself as the establishment to McHattie, and picked up support from political fixtures such as former Hamilton regional chairman Terry Cooke.
- Brian McHattie, incumbent councillor, focused on his environmental activism and dedication to expanding student housing through Ward One, which includes McMaster University.
- Developer Fred Spencer called the race an "eye-opener" and lamented the lack of student involvement.

=== Ward Two (Downtown) ===
Summary of the November 13, 2006 Hamilton, Ontario Ward Two councillor election
Candidate	Popular vote		
Candidate	Votes	%	±%
Bob Bratina (incumbent)	4,001	66.78%	+30.04% Note 1
Judy MacDonald-Musitano	1,424	23.77%	+17.75% Note 1
Dawn Lescaudron	319	5.32%	-
Haider Shaikh	247	4.12%	-
Total votes	5,991	100%	
Registered voters	19,782	31.25%	
Note: All Hamilton Municipal Elections are officially non-partisan. Note: Candidate campaign colours are based on the prominent colour used in campaign items (signs, literature, etc.) and are used as a visual differentiation between candidates. Note 1: Results compared to 2004 By-Election
Sources: Hamilton, Ontario, City Clerk's Office

- Bob Bratina, the incumbent councillor with only two years on council after winning a 2004 by-election, focused this campaign on transparency, increased policing and improved Via Rail service in the city.
- Dawn Lescaudron was a first-time candidate, and did not interact with local media for the duration of the campaign.
- Judy MacDonald-Musitano, who also ran in the 2004 by-election, held as her campaign principles the enforcement of a mandatory balanced budget, improved affordable transit and removal of parking meters in the downtown core.
- Haider Shaikh promoted lower taxes, increased infrastructure spending and attracting new investment.

=== Ward Three (Hamilton Centre) ===
Summary of the November 13, 2006 Hamilton, Ontario Ward Three councillor election
Candidate	Popular vote		
Candidate	Votes	%	±%
Bernie Morelli (incumbent)	4,460	72.65%	+5.17%
Sean Gibson	1,679	27.35%	-
Total votes	6,139	100%	
Registered voters	23,913	26.63%	
Note: All Hamilton Municipal Elections are officially non-partisan. Note: Candidate campaign colours are based on the prominent colour used in campaign items (signs, literature, etc.) and are used as a visual differentiation between candidates.
Sources: Hamilton, Ontario, City Clerk's Office

- Sean Gibson, owner of the Barber Center, a school of hairdressing, organized youth and minorities to give them greater representation on council.
- Bernie Morelli, a 16-year veteran of Hamilton, Ontario City Council, made public safety, new parks and reduced transit fees for seniors his campaign priorities.

=== Ward Four (East Hamilton) ===
Summary of the November 13, 2006 Hamilton, Ontario Ward Four councillor election
Candidate	Popular vote		
Candidate	Votes	%	±%
Sam Merulla (incumbent)	5,005	63.04%	+8.82
Dave Wilson	2,396	30.18%	-
Norm Bulbrook	368	4.63%	-
Dave Banko	171	2.15%	-
Total votes	8,042	100%	
Registered voters	23,322	34.48%	
Note: All Hamilton Municipal Elections are officially non-partisan. Note: Candidate campaign colours are based on the prominent colour used in campaign items (signs, literature, etc.) and are used as a visual differentiation between candidates.
Sources: Hamilton, Ontario, City Clerk's Office

=== Ward Five (Red Hill) ===
Summary of the November 13, 2006 Hamilton, Ontario Ward Five councillor election
Candidate	Popular vote		
Candidate	Votes	%	±%
Chad Collins (incumbent)	8,245	90.26%	+15.06%
George Gamble	890	9.74%	-
Total votes	9,444	100%	
Registered voters	24,937	37.87%	
Note: All Hamilton Municipal Elections are officially non-partisan. Note: Candidate campaign colours are based on the prominent colour used in campaign items (signs, literature, etc.) and are used as a visual differentiation between candidates.
Sources: Hamilton, Ontario, City Clerk's Office

=== Ward Six (East Mountain) ===
Summary of the November 13, 2006 Hamilton, Ontario Ward Six councillor election
Candidate	Popular vote		
Candidate	Votes	%	±%
Tom Jackson (incumbent)	8,479	79.70%	+4.87%
Nathalie Xian Yi Yan	2,160	20.30%	-
Total votes	10,907	100%	
Registered voters	27,699	39.38%	
Note: All Hamilton Municipal Elections are officially non-partisan. Note: Candidate campaign colours are based on the prominent colour used in campaign items (signs, literature, etc.) and are used as a visual differentiation between candidates.
Sources: Hamilton, Ontario, City Clerk's Office

=== Ward Seven (Central Mountain) ===
Summary of the November 13, 2006 Hamilton, Ontario Ward Seven councillor election
Candidate	Popular vote		
Candidate	Votes	%	±%
Scott Duvall	4,111	29.56%	-
Dennis Haining	2,554	18.36%	-
Dave Shuttleworth	2,509	18.04%	-
John Gallagher	1,281	9.21%	+1.11%
Mark DiMillo	1,179	8.48%	-
Mark Harrington	1,031	7.41%	-
Tim Nolan	994	7.15%	-
Mark-Alan Whittle	249	1.79%	-
Total votes	14,209	100%	
Registered voters	38,478	36.93%	
Note: All Hamilton Municipal Elections are officially non-partisan. Note: Candidate campaign colours are based on the prominent colour used in campaign items (signs, literature, etc.) and are used as a visual differentiation between candidates.
Sources: Hamilton, Ontario, City Clerk's Office

=== Ward Eight (West Mountain) ===
Summary of the November 13, 2006 Hamilton, Ontario Ward Eight councillor election
Candidate	Popular vote		
Candidate	Votes	%	±%
Terry Whitehead (Incumbent)	7,829	55.72	+28.59%
Frank D'Amico	3,614	25.72	-
Peter Martin	2,387	16.99	+2.03%
Wayne Boychuk	221	1.57	+0.52%
Total votes	14,190	100%	
Registered voters	32,996	43.01%	
Note: All Hamilton Municipal Elections are officially non-partisan. Note: Candidate campaign colours are based on the prominent colour used in campaign items (signs, literature, etc.) and are used as a visual differentiation between candidates.
Sources: Hamilton, Ontario, City Clerk's Office

=== Ward Nine (Upper Stoney Creek) ===
Summary of the November 13, 2006 Hamilton, Ontario Ward Nine councillor election
Candidate	Popular vote		
Candidate	Votes	%	±%
Brad Clark	3,394	50.92%	-
Phil Bruckler (Incumbent)	3,271	49.08%	-4.72%
Total votes	6,760	100%	
Registered voters	18,202	37.14%	
Note: All Hamilton Municipal Elections are officially non-partisan. Note: Candidate campaign colours are based on the prominent colour used in campaign items (signs, literature, etc.) and are used as a visual differentiation between candidates.
Sources: Hamilton, Ontario, City Clerk's Office

=== Ward Ten (Lower Stoney Creek) ===
Summary of the November 13, 2006 Hamilton, Ontario Ward Ten councillor election
Candidate	Popular vote		
Candidate	Votes	%	±%
Maria Pearson (Incumbent)	5,784	75.07%	+38.1%
Mary Ray	1,414	18.35%	-
Keith Beck	507	6.58%	-
Total votes	7,898	100%	
Registered voters	19,112	41.32%	
Note: All Hamilton Municipal Elections are officially non-partisan. Note: Candidate campaign colours are based on the prominent colour used in campaign items (signs, literature, etc.) and are used as a visual differentiation between candidates.
Sources: Hamilton, Ontario, City Clerk's Office

=== Ward Eleven (Glanbrook-Winona) ===
Summary of the November 13, 2006 Hamilton, Ontario Ward Eleven councillor election
Candidate	Popular vote		
Candidate	Votes	%	±%
David Mitchell (Incumbent)	4,646	60.04%	n/a Note 1
Joseph Baiardo	1,949	25.19%	-
Sergio Della Fortuna	1,143	14.77%	-
Total votes	7,845	100%	
Registered voters	19,488	40.26%	
Note: All Hamilton Municipal Elections are officially non-partisan. Note: Candidate campaign colours are based on the prominent colour used in campaign items (signs, literature, etc.) and are used as a visual differentiation between candidates. Note 1: Mitchell was acclaimed in 2003.
Sources: Hamilton, Ontario, City Clerk's Office

=== Ward Twelve (Ancaster) ===
Summary of the November 13, 2006, Hamilton, Ontario Ward Twelve councillor election
Candidate	Popular vote		
Candidate	Votes	%	±%
Lloyd Ferguson	3,549	37.07%	-
Aznive Mallett	2,629	27.46%	-
Ryan Hale	2,625	27.42%	-
John Rocchi	690	7.21%	-
David Hodds	82	0.86%	-
Total votes	8,658		
Registered voters	17,994	43.44%	
Note: All Hamilton Municipal Elections are officially non-partisan. Note: Candidate campaign colours are based on the prominent colour used in campaign items (signs, literature, etc.) and are used as a visual differentiation between candidates.
Sources: Hamilton, Ontario, City Clerk's Office

=== Ward Thirteen (Dundas) ===
Summary of the November 13, 2006, Hamilton, Ontario Ward Thirteen councillor election
Candidate	Popular vote		
Candidate	Votes	%	±%
Russ Powers	2,667	34.33%	-
Julia Kollek	2,404	30.95%	-
Keith Sharp	1,855	23.88%	-
Peggy Chapman	842	10.84%	-
Total votes	7,817		
Registered voters	17,994	43.44%	
Note: All Hamilton Municipal Elections are officially non-partisan. Note: Candidate campaign colours are based on the prominent colour used in campaign items (signs, literature, etc.) and are used as a visual differentiation between candidates.
Sources: Hamilton, Ontario, City Clerk's Office

=== Ward Fourteen (Wentworth) ===
Summary of the November 13, 2006, Hamilton, Ontario Ward Fourteen councillor election
Candidate	Popular vote		
Candidate	Votes	%	±%
Robert Pasuta	2,519	59.78%	-
Grant Maloney	1,695	40.22%	-
Total votes	4,274		
Registered voters	11,682	36.59%	
Note: All Hamilton Municipal Elections are officially non-partisan. Note: Candidate campaign colours are based on the prominent colour used in campaign items (signs, literature, etc.) and are used as a visual differentiation between candidates.
Sources: Hamilton, Ontario, City Clerk's Office

=== Ward Fifteen (Flamborough) ===
Summary of the November 13, 2006, Hamilton, Ontario Ward Fifteen councillor election
Candidate	Popular vote		
Candidate	Votes	%	±%
Margaret McCarthy (Incumbent)	3,657	58.83%	+8.4%
Judi Partridge	2,559	41.17%	-
Total votes	6,243		
Registered voters	17,445	35.79%	
Note: All Hamilton Municipal Elections are officially non-partisan. Note: Candidate campaign colours are based on the prominent colour used in campaign items (signs, literature, etc.) and are used as a visual differentiation between candidates.
Sources: Hamilton, Ontario, City Clerk's Office

== Public School Board election ==
Summary of the November 13, 2006 Hamilton, Ontario Ward One and Two Public School Board trustee election
Candidate	Popular vote		
Candidate	Votes	%	±%
Judith Bishop (incumbent)	Acclaimed		
Total votes			
Registered voters			
Note: All Hamilton Municipal Elections are officially non-partisan. Note: Candidate campaign colours are based on the prominent colour used in campaign items (signs, literature, etc.) and are used as a visual differentiation between candidates.
Sources: Hamilton, Ontario, City Clerk's Office

Candidates for the November 13, 2006 Hamilton, Ontario Ward Three Public School Board trustee election
Candidate	Popular vote		
Candidate	Votes	%	±%
Tim Simmons	1,492	39.79%	-
Michael Adkins	811	21.63%	-
Alex Moroz	808	21.55%	-
Ryan Sparrow	639	17.04%	-
Total votes	3,750		
Registered voters			
Note: All Hamilton Municipal Elections are officially non-partisan. Note: Candidate campaign colours are based on the prominent colour used in campaign items (signs, literature, etc.) and are used as a visual differentiation between candidates.
Sources: Hamilton, Ontario, City Clerk's Office

Candidates for the November 13, 2006 Hamilton, Ontario Ward Four Public School Board trustee election
Candidate	Popular vote		
Candidate	Votes	%	±%
Ray Mulholland (incumbent)	3,196	58.78%	-
Christy Cowan	2,241	41.22%	-
Total votes	5,437		
Registered voters			
Note: All Hamilton Municipal Elections are officially non-partisan. Note: Candidate campaign colours are based on the prominent colour used in campaign items (signs, literature, etc.) and are used as a visual differentiation between candidates.
Sources: Hamilton, Ontario, City Clerk's Office

Candidates for the November 13, 2006 Hamilton, Ontario Ward Five Public School Board trustee election
Candidate	Popular vote		
Candidate	Votes	%	±%
Ron English	2,639	53.75%	-
Judy Kloosterman	2,271	46.25%	-
Total votes	4,910		
Registered voters			
Note: All Hamilton Municipal Elections are officially non-partisan. Note: Candidate campaign colours are based on the prominent colour used in campaign items (signs, literature, etc.) and are used as a visual differentiation between candidates.
Sources: Hamilton, Ontario, City Clerk's Office

Candidates for the November 13, 2006 Hamilton, Ontario Ward Six Public School Board trustee election
Candidate	Popular vote		
Candidate	Votes	%	±%
Laura Peddle	2,499	37.55%	-
Kathy Archer (incumbent)	2,408	36.18%	-
Lorrie McKibbon	1,084	16.29%	-
Matt Terry	664	9.98%	-
Total votes	6,655		
Registered voters			
Note: All Hamilton Municipal Elections are officially non-partisan. Note: Candidate campaign colours are based on the prominent colour used in campaign items (signs, literature, etc.) and are used as a visual differentiation between candidates.
Sources: Hamilton, Ontario, City Clerk's Office

Candidates for the November 13, 2006 Hamilton, Ontario Ward Seven Public School Board trustee election
Candidate	Popular vote		
Candidate	Votes	%	±%
Lillian Orban (incumbent)	4,778	57.27%	-
Judy Colantino	3,565	42.73%	-
Total votes	8,343		
Registered voters			
Note: All Hamilton Municipal Elections are officially non-partisan. Note: Candidate campaign colours are based on the prominent colour used in campaign items (signs, literature, etc.) and are used as a visual differentiation between candidates.
Sources: Hamilton, Ontario, City Clerk's Office

Candidates for the November 13, 2006 Hamilton, Ontario Ward Eight Public School Board trustee election
Candidate	Popular vote		
Candidate	Votes	%	±%
Wes Hicks	4,410	53.13%	-
Al Pierce (incumbent)	2,556	42.73%	-
Sylvia Thomas	1,334	16.07%	-
Total votes	8,300		
Registered voters			
Note: All Hamilton Municipal Elections are officially non-partisan. Note: Candidate campaign colours are based on the prominent colour used in campaign items (signs, literature, etc.) and are used as a visual differentiation between candidates.
Sources: Hamilton, Ontario, City Clerk's Office

Candidates for the November 13, 2006 Hamilton, Ontario Ward Nine and Ten Public School Board trustee election
Candidate	Popular vote		
Candidate	Votes	%	±%
Robert Barlow	3,495	47.54%	-
John Davidson (incumbent)	2,587	35.19%	-
Michael Gemmel	1,270	17.27%	-
Total votes	7,352		
Registered voters			
Note: All Hamilton Municipal Elections are officially non-partisan. Note: Candidate campaign colours are based on the prominent colour used in campaign items (signs, literature, etc.) and are used as a visual differentiation between candidates.
Sources: Hamilton, Ontario, City Clerk's Office

Candidates for the November 13, 2006 Hamilton, Ontario Ward Eleven and Twelve Public School Board trustee election
Candidate	Popular vote		
Candidate	Votes	%	±%
Shirley Glauser	6,031	62.86%	-
Bob Maton	1,921	20.02%	-
Peter Accadia	1,642	17.11%	-
Total votes	9,594		
Registered voters			
Note: All Hamilton Municipal Elections are officially non-partisan. Note: Candidate campaign colours are based on the prominent colour used in campaign items (signs, literature, etc.) and are used as a visual differentiation between candidates.
Sources: Hamilton, Ontario, City Clerk's Office

Candidates for the November 13, 2006 Hamilton, Ontario Ward Thirteen Public School Board trustee election
Candidate	Popular vote		
Candidate	Votes	%	±%
Jessica Brennan (incumbent)	4,548	78.81%	-
Tyler Rockliffe	1,223	20.02%	-
Total votes	5,771		
Registered voters			
Note: All Hamilton Municipal Elections are officially non-partisan. Note: Candidate campaign colours are based on the prominent colour used in campaign items (signs, literature, etc.) and are used as a visual differentiation between candidates.
Sources: Hamilton, Ontario, City Clerk's Office

Candidates for the November 13, 2006 Hamilton, Ontario Wards Fourteen and Fifteen Public School Board trustee election
Candidate	Popular vote		
Candidate	Votes	%	±%
Karen Turkstra	4,180	50.84%	-
Reg Woodworth (incumbent)	4,042	49.16%	-
Total votes	8,222		
Registered voters			
Note: All Hamilton Municipal Elections are officially non-partisan. Note: Candidate campaign colours are based on the prominent colour used in campaign items (signs, literature, etc.) and are used as a visual differentiation between candidates.
Sources: Hamilton, Ontario, City Clerk's Office

== Catholic School Board Election ==
Candidate	Votes	%
Wards 1 and 2
Louis Agro	1,381	60.38
M. Scullion-Mindorff	906	39.62
Total valid votes	2,287	100.00
Wards 3 and 4
Ralph Agostino	2,158	55.36
David Martin	1,358	34.84
Brian Nestor	382	9.80
Total valid votes	3,898	100.00
Ward 5
Linda DiBartolomeo	1,623	44.80
Salvatore Agostino	1,462	40.35
Enzo Galano	538	14.85
Total valid votes	3,623	100.00
Ward 6
Kyran Kennedy	acclaimed	
Ward 7
Patrick Daly	acclaimed	
Ward 8
Sergio Manchia	acclaimed	
Wards 9 - 11
Mary Nardini	5,309	36.85
Ray Bartolotti	3,838	26.64
Frank Lasowski	2,213	15.36
Rino Menegazzo	2,005	13.91
Steve Denault	1,044	7.25
Total valid votes	14,409	100.00
Wards 12 - 15
Carolyn Cornale	3,313	64.88
Phil Homerski	1,793	35.12
Total valid votes	5,106	100.00

== French Public School Board Election ==
Candidate	Votes	%
Micheline Wylde	463	61.41
C. Sassou Messan	291	38.59
Total valid votes	754	100.00

== French Catholic School Board Election ==
Candidate	Votes	%
Marcel Lévesque	acclaimed

== See also ==
- List of Hamilton, Ontario, municipal elections
