= Larry Di Ianni =

Italian-Canadian politician and educator

54th Mayor of Hamilton
- In office 2003–2006
- Preceded by: Robert E. Wade
- Succeeded by: Fred Eisenberger

Personal details
- Born: 1948 (age 77–78) Villetta Barrea, Abruzzo, Italy
- Party: Independent
- Other political affiliations: Liberal; Ontario Liberal
- Spouse: Ginetta Paolone
- Profession: Politician; educator

Larry Di Ianni (born Renzo Pasquale Di Ianni, 1948) is an Italian-Canadian politician and educator who served as the 54th mayor of Hamilton from 2003 to 2006. Prior to his tenure as mayor, he served as a town councillor in Stoney Creek and a city councillor in the amalgamated City of Hamilton.

== Early life ==
Di Ianni immigrated to Canada from Abruzzo, Italy in 1956 as a boy. Following his father, who had immigrated years before the family and found work at Stelco, Di Ianni and his family settled in an apartment on Cannon Street.

Pressured by his mother, an assembly-line worker in a shoe factory, to receive a university education, Di Ianni graduated from McMaster University with a bachelor's degree in English and went on to receive his master's degree in Education from the University of Toronto soon after.

After graduating, Di Ianni moved with his wife Janet (Ginetta) and three children, Robert, Paul and Stephanie, to Stoney Creek. There, he was hired by the Hamilton-Wentworth Catholic District School Board as a high school teacher and eventually became principal of several high schools.

== Political history ==
Di Ianni was first elected to Stoney Creek Council in 1982, where he served for six terms until the amalgamation of the town into Hamilton. Following amalgamation, he was elected to Hamilton City Council as councillor for Ward Ten, defeating former Stoney Creek Deputy Mayor Albert Marrone and town Councillor Maria Pearson in a hotly contested race. Di Ianni served one term as a Hamilton councillor until November 2003.

In early March 2003, Di Ianni was approached by members of the Ontario Liberals, including then-Premier Dalton McGuinty, in an effort to convince him to run provincially against Labour Minister Brad Clark. Di Ianni ultimately declined the offer, noting that he wished to focus on municipal issues.

In the same month, sitting Hamilton Mayor Bob Wade announced he would not seek re-election in the 2003 municipal election. On April 28, 2003, Di Ianni announced he would seek the office of mayor, indicating that he believed Hamilton to be at a crossroads with regard to development. His main opponent in the race was former provincial NDP cabinet minister David Christopherson. The race focused considerably on the construction of the Red Hill Valley Parkway, of which Di Ianni was in favour and Christopherson was opposed. The candidates sparred frequently on the campaign trail, with Di Ianni promoting his municipal experience and support from the business community while Christopherson highlighted his time in cabinet and support from organized labour and progressive political organizations. On election night, Di Ianni defeated Christopherson by a margin of 52% to 39%. Speaking to reporters, Di Ianni noted he was happy that the voters of Hamilton had elected their first Italian-Canadian mayor by such a large margin.

Di Ianni's term as mayor saw him attempt to enact his mayoral platform by addressing such issues as the completion of the Red Hill Expressway, business tax reduction, airport development, improving relations among the amalgamated municipalities, and obtaining additional social service funding from the more senior levels of government.

In the 2008 federal election, Di Ianni was the Liberal candidate in the federal riding of Hamilton East—Stoney Creek, losing the race to incumbent MP Wayne Marston of the NDP by a margin of 6,464 votes.

Di Ianni ran unsuccessfully for mayor of Hamilton in October 2010.

== Electoral record ==
Summary of the October 25, 2010 Hamilton mayoral election
Candidate	Popular vote		
Candidate	Votes	%	±%
Bob Bratina	52,684	37.32%	n/a
Larry Di Ianni	40,091	28.40%	-14.44%
Fred Eisenberger (incumbent)	38,719	27.43%	-15.78%
Michael Baldasaro	2,892	2.05%	-1.56%
Tone Marrone	1,052	0.75%	n/a
Mahesh Butani	950	0.67%	n/a
Glenn Hamilton	949	0.67%	n/a
Pasquale (Pat) Filice	768	0.54%	n/a
Ken Leach	577	0.41%	n/a
Andrew Haines	557	0.39%	n/a
Mark Wozny	433	0.31%	n/a
Steven Waxman	429	0.30%	n/a
Edward Graydon	404	0.29%	n/a
Gino Speziale	356	0.25%	-0.77%
Victor Veri	313	0.22%	n/a
Total votes	141,174	100%	
Registered voters	353,317	40.45%	+3.2%
Note: All Hamilton municipal elections are officially non-partisan. Note: Candidate campaign colours are based on the prominent colour used in campaign items (signs, literature, etc.) and are used as a visual differentiation between candidates.
Sources: Hamilton, Ontario, City Clerk's Office

Summary of the November 13, 2006 Hamilton mayoral election
Candidate	Popular vote		
Candidate	Votes	%	±%
Fred Eisenberger	54,110	43.21%	n/a
Larry Di Ianni (Incumbent)	53,658	42.84%	−8.08%
Diane Elms	9,459	7.55%	n/a
Michael Baldasaro	4,520	3.61%	+1.76%
Gino Speziale	1,274	1.02	n/a
Steve Leach	1,250	1.00	n/a
Martin S. Zuliniak	968	0.77	n/a
Total votes	126,986	100%	
Registered voters	340,941	37.25%	−0.72%
Note: All Hamilton municipal elections are officially non-partisan. Note: Candidate campaign colours are based on the prominent colour used in campaign items (signs, literature, etc.) and are used as a visual differentiation between candidates.
Sources: Hamilton, Ontario, City Clerk's Office Archived 2010-08-20 at the Wayback Machine

Candidates for the November 10, 2003 Hamilton mayoral election
Candidate	Popular vote		
Candidate	Votes	%	±%
Larry DiIanni	70,539	50.92%	
David Christopherson	54,298	39.20%	
Dick Wildeman	4,462	3.22%	
Michael Peters	3,270	2.36%	
Tom Murray	2,881	2.08%	
Michael Baldasaro	2,569	1.85%	
Matt Jelly	510	0.37%	
Total votes	139,902	37.97%	
Registered voters	368,480	100%	
Note: All Hamilton municipal elections are officially non-partisan. Note: Candidate campaign colours are based on the prominent colour used in campaign items (signs, literature, etc.) and are used as a visual differentiation between candidates.
Sources: City of Hamilton, "2003 Results"
