= Russ Powers =

Canadian politician (born 1949)

Russ Powers MP
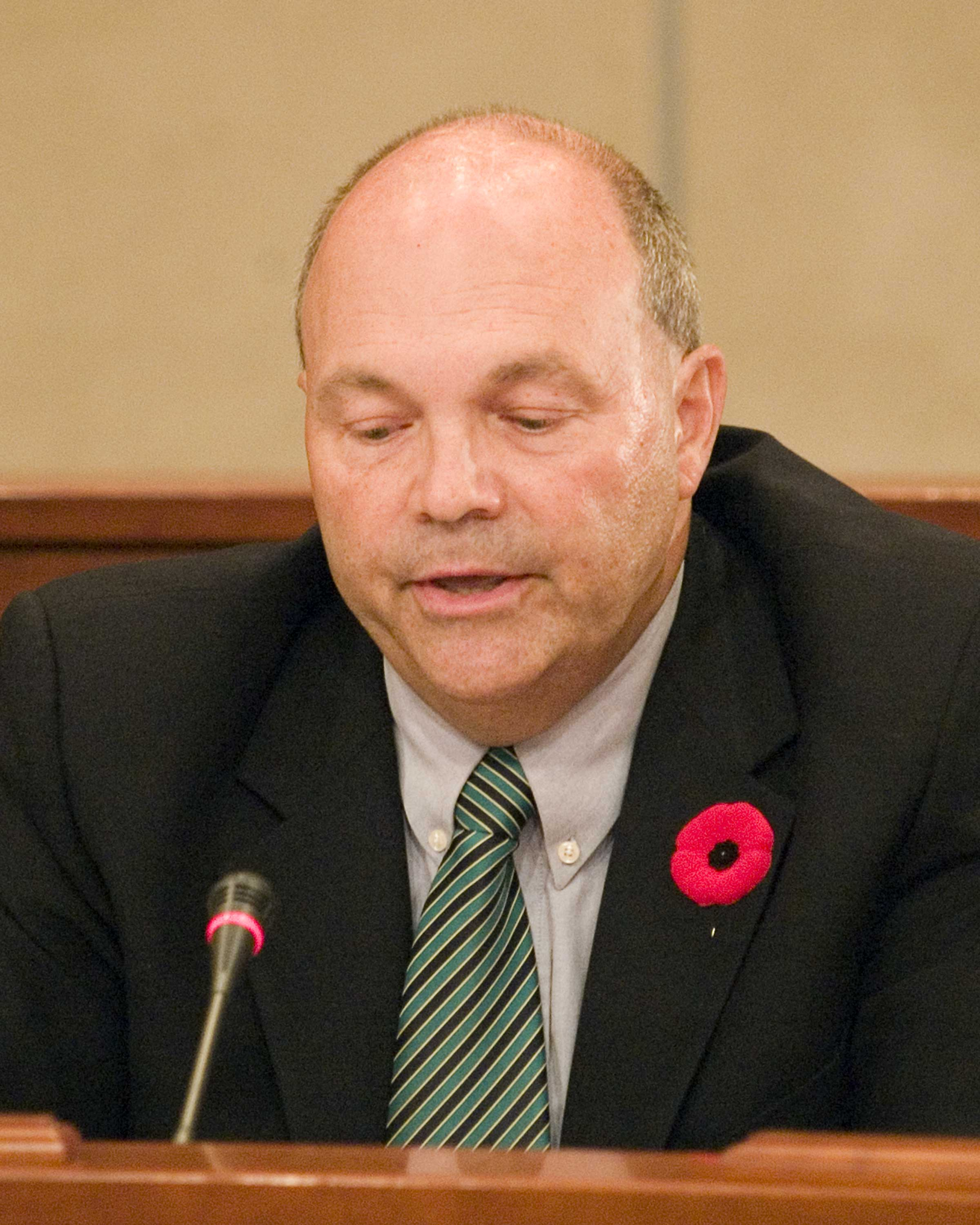

Member of Parliament for Ancaster—Dundas—Flamborough—Westdale
- In office October 4, 2004 – January 23, 2006
- Preceded by: Riding Created
- Succeeded by: David Sweet

Hamilton City Councillor (Ward 13 - Dundas)
- In office December 1, 2000 – October 3, 2004
- Preceded by: Ward Created
- Succeeded by: Art Samson

Hamilton City Councillor (Ward 13 - Dundas)
- In office December 1, 2006 – November 30, 2014.
- Preceded by: Art Samson
- Succeeded by: Arlene VanderBeek

Dundas Town Councillor
- In office December 1, 1982 – November 30, 2000
- Succeeded by: Town Merged with Hamilton

Hamilton City Councillor (Ward 5 - Red Hill)
- In office November 2021 – October 24, 2022
- Preceded by: Chad Collins
- Succeeded by: Matt Francis

Personal details
- Born: March 2, 1949 (age 77) Toronto, Ontario, Canada
- Party: Liberal
- Profession: Lab Technician

Russ Powers (born March 2, 1949) is a Canadian politician. He was a member of the House of Commons in Canada's 38th Parliament, representing the riding of Ancaster—Dundas—Flamborough—Westdale for the Liberal Party from 2004 to 2006.

== Early life ==
Born in Toronto, Ontario, Powers moved with his family to Dundas, Ontario in 1966, and remains a member of that community. He was educated at Dundas District High School, Mohawk College and the Royal Institute of Public Health and Hygiene, and worked at McMaster University in laboratory medicine from 1979 until his retirement in 2007. Powers also has military experience, having served as a Logistics Officer in the Canadian Army & Air Reserves.

== Political career ==
First elected to municipal office in Dundas in 1982. In 1995, he became a Hamilton-Wentworth Regional Councillor representing Dundas. When Dundas was amalgamated with Hamilton in 2000, Powers was elected as Dundas' first representative to the Hamilton, Ontario City Council in the newly created Ward 13.

In 2003, the Hamilton Conservation Authority (HCA) named a bridge on the west-end Rail Trail crossing Binkley Hollow and the Ancaster Creek for Powers. The bridge, a former TH&B Rail bridge, is named "Powers Crossing" in honour of Powers' time as chair of the HCA.

In 2004, Powers resigned mid-term from his city council seat to run for Member of Parliament in the newly created riding of Ancaster—Dundas—Flamborough—Westdale. Running as the Liberal candidate in the 2004 election, Powers defeated Conservative David Sweet and New Democrat Gordon Guyatt. In the 2006 election, each of the same candidates contested the riding again. This time, however, Conservative David Sweet defeated Powers.

Following his defeat, Powers again sought his old Hamilton council seat in Ward 13 in the city's 2006 election and was re-elected. In 2010, he successfully sought re-election as Ward 13 Councillor. From 2012 to 2014, Powers served as president of the Association of Municipalities of Ontario (AMO) and a director of the Federation of Canadian Municipalities (FCM). In 2014, Powers announced he would not run again in that year's municipal election. At the time, there was speculation that Powers would seek the Liberal nomination to run in the newly created riding of Hamilton West-Ancaster-Dundas. Powers ultimately declined, and Filomena Tassi became the Liberal candidate for the 2015 federal election. Though he declined to run again, Powers opted to endorse former Progressive Conservative cabinet minister Brad Clark for mayor in Hamilton's 2014 election.

== Post-Politics ==
Since declining to seek the Liberal nomination for Parliament in 2015, Powers has spent his retirement involved in local volunteer organizations.

| Preceded by Riding created | Member of Parliament for Ancaster—Dundas—Flamborough—Westdale; 2004–2006 | Succeeded by David Sweet |
