= Michael Baldasaro =

Canadian religious and political figure (1949–2016)

Archbishop of The Church of the Universe

Personal details
- Born: May 23, 1949
- Died: June 9, 2016 (aged 67) Hamilton, Ontario, Canada
- Profession: Religious leader, marijuana activist
- Website: Church of the Universe

Michael A. James Baldasaro (May 23, 1949 – June 9, 2016) was a Canadian political and religious figure from Hamilton, Ontario. He presided over a religious sect known as the Church of the Universe. Baldasaro received significant media coverage over his lifetime for his advocacy on behalf of marijuana legalization, as well as his status as a perennial candidate in numerous Hamilton-area elections.

== The Church of the Universe ==
Baldasaro was a member of the Church of the Universe, where he was commonly known as Brother Michael. The Church has been in existence since 1969, when it was founded by the late Walter Tucker, and Baldasaro remained continuously active in its operations. Its members use marijuana as a sacrament and previously operated from the Church Headquarters, an abandoned rock quarry near Puslinch, Ontario.

The quarry was named 'Clearwater Abbey', which church members called 'a beautiful oasis' where they could practice naturism and cultivate marijuana. In 2004, after selling small amounts of marijuana on multiple occasions to an undercover police officer at their Barton Street, Hamilton residence, Baldasaro and Tucker were arrested and charged with trafficking. In 2007, they pleaded not guilty to the charges but after a lengthy trial, a jury found them both guilty. At their sentencing hearing in April 2008, Baldasaro, who had 12 previous trafficking convictions, was sentenced to a two-year penitentiary term while Tucker was sentenced to a one-year reformatory term. The Crown also applied to the court to have the property from which they distributed marijuana and their Church forfeited to the federal government as an offence-related property, and the Crown's application was granted.

== Political activities ==
Baldasaro, a perennial candidate, saw his support peak in 1988, when he was the sole opponent of incumbent mayor Bob Morrow. He received over 7,500 votes, which was approximately 10% of the vote.

Baldasaro stood in the 2004 Ward 2 by-election, following the resignation of Andrea Horwath, and placed seventh out of eleven candidates with 52 votes. In 2006, Baldasaro again ran for mayor of Hamilton and received 4,520 votes or 3.6% of the total vote.

Baldasaro ran for Parliament three times. In 1984, Baldasaro received 300 votes as a Libertarian candidate in the federal riding of Hamilton West. In 2000, Baldasaro won 573 votes as a Marijuana Party of Canada candidate in Hamilton East. In 2004, Baldasaro received 345 votes as an independent candidate in Hamilton Centre.

Baldasaro also announced he would be a candidate for the Progressive Conservative leadership convention in 1998. He developed a plan to revitalize the party's flagging poll numbers by encouraging direct democracy, pardoning individuals convicted on marijuana possession, cutting government pensions and making the words to O Canada gender neutral. Baldasaro was forced to withdraw when he could not meet the filing fee and threatened legal action against the party when they refused to waive $30,000 entrance fee.

Two years later, in 2000, Baldasaro attempted to join the Canadian Alliance leadership race. His plans again involved legalizing marijuana, but this time also favoured abolishing political parties altogether. He openly admitted that the challenge was mostly for publicity, and that he did not expect to win against the likes of Preston Manning or Stockwell Day. He was dissuaded, once more, by the party's $25,000 leadership nomination fee.

In 2007, Baldasaro started a campaign to save Hamilton's Centre Mall from conversion into a 'power center' operated by SmartCenters. In 2007, during Hamilton City Council's debate over the renovation of City Hall, Baldasaro and Tucker sent a letter addressed to Mayor Fred Eisenberger and City Council, requesting they move municipal operations to Stelco Tower, in Hamilton's downtown core.

Baldasaro was a candidate for the 2010 Hamilton Municipal Elections, once again running for Mayor. He finished fourth in a field of fifteen candidates, with 2.1% of the vote. In the 2014 Hamilton Municipal Elections Baldasaro stood for Mayor and finished with 2.9% of the vote in a field of twelve candidates.

== Death ==
Baldasaro died of cancer on June 9, 2016, aged 67.
