= 2014 Hamilton, Ontario, municipal election =

Municipal election

2014 Hamilton municipal election
- October 27, 2014
- Turnout: 33.53%
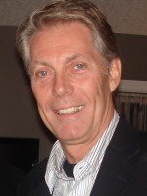

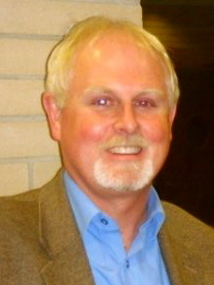
		BC
Candidate	Fred Eisenberger	Brad Clark	Brian McHattie
Popular vote	49,020	38,706	25,020
Percentage	39.93%	31.53%	20.38%
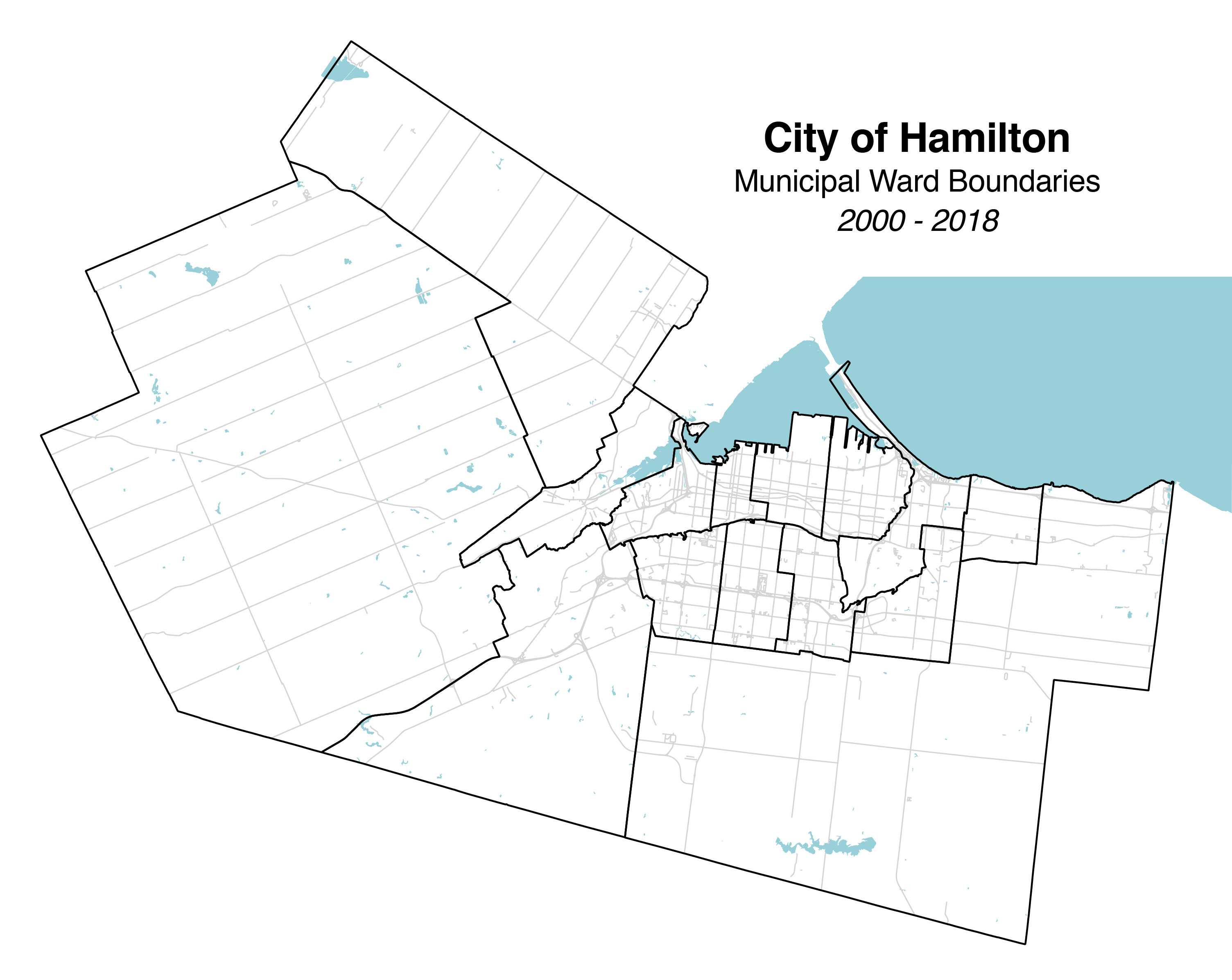
- The ward boundaries used for the 2014 municipal election

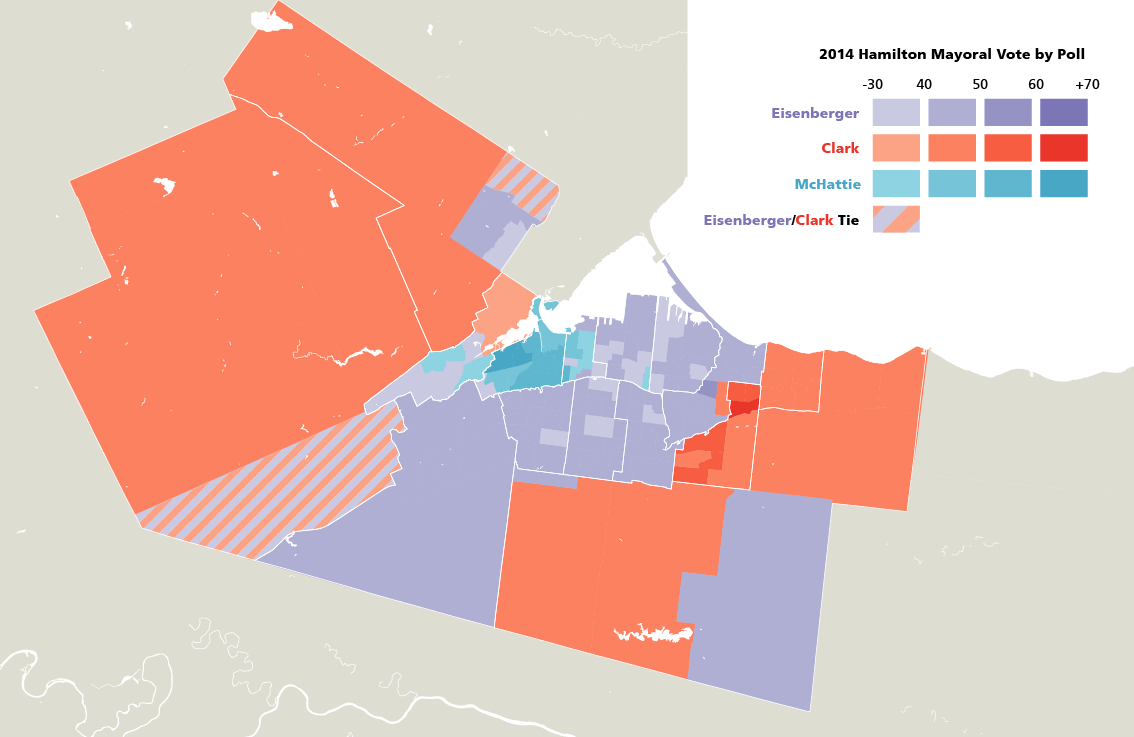
- Mayoral results by polling division
Mayor before election
Bob Bratina
Elected mayor
Fred Eisenberger

The 2014 Hamilton municipal election occurred on October 27, 2014, to select one mayor, fifteen members of the Hamilton City Council and members of both English and French public and Catholic school boards. As per the Ontario Municipal Elections Act, nominations opened on January 2, 2014, and closed on September 12, 2014. Four new councillors were elected in open seats across Hamilton, while all incumbents who stood for re-election returned to office. Though marked by a steep decline in voter turnout, this election was historic, as it saw the election of Hamilton's first openly gay and first radicalized members of city council.

== Issues ==
=== Ward boundary reform ===
Following a decision by the 2006–2010 council to put off examining electoral reform in Hamilton until after the 2010 election, the 2010–2014 council heard a staff recommendation for moving forward on redrawing ward boundaries. They moved to defer the issue to a later date, which would see the city miss the deadline of December 31, 2013 set by the Ontario Municipal Board for having district changes implemented before the municipal election in 2014.

Councillors provided a number of arguments for and against the plan to redraw ward boundaries, most notably highlighting the discrepancies between councillors in terms of the number of constituents represented, with Ward 7's councillor representing 64,000 constituents and Ward 11's councillor representing 14,000, and the $340,000 cost to taxpayers for maintaining a new council seat.

In April 2012, a number of community activists began circulating a petition that aimed to force councillors to act on the issue of ward boundaries. A provision in the Municipal Act states that residents of a municipality can actively seek to change ward boundaries by collecting 500 signatures of registered voters and submitting them to their respective city council. Municipal officials then have 90 days to act on the matter, following which, the petitioners can appeal to the Ontario Municipal Board if the decision rendered by their council is unsatisfactory. That same month, the Spectator published an editorial stating their position on the issue, calling for a public debate on the matter of ward boundaries and Hamilton's 'democratic inequality'. The petition was officially submitted to the city on April 23, 2012.

In response to the growing pressure from the community on the issue, councillors Terry Whitehead (Ward 8) and Scott Duvall (Ward 7) co-authored a piece outlining their reasoning for not supporting redrawing Hamilton's ward boundaries, noting that the costs associated with doing so would be prohibitive and that, with the area's projected growth for the coming years being considerable, it would be irresponsible for them to engage in a discussion about ward boundary revisions before the 2014 vote.

By June 2012, councillors had decided to commit $260,000 to a study that would examine boundary reform in 2015, with a proposal to come forward regarding changes for the 2018 municipal election.

The Hamilton-Wentworth District School Board attempted to reallocate the ward boundaries for trustees in 2013, suggesting a number of alterations that would have alleviated some of the pressures on representatives. Bound to 11 trustees divided across Hamilton's 15 wards, the necessity to combine wards caused controversy among sitting trustees. The proposals suggested would have created two large wards each represented by two trustees and merged Wards Two and Three, which drew criticism from community groups. Trustees eventually decided to task the 2014–2018 board with examining ward boundary reform after city council redraws boundaries.

=== Proposed casino ===
In 2012, the Ontario Lottery and Gaming Corporation sought to consult local governments on the location of new casinos across the province. At the city's lottery and gaming subcommittee, Councillor Sam Merulla (Ward 4) called for a referendum to be held concurrent with the 2014 election to determine whether citizens were supportive of a casino being located in the downtown core. The call for a public vote was supported by leader of the Ontario New Democrats Andrea Horwath and opposed by Ancaster—Dundas—Flambrough—Westdale MPP Ted McMeekin.

A poll commissioned by the Hamilton Spectator indicated that 56% of Hamiltonians opposed a casino opening in the city, with a majority of disapproval coming from residents in the city's west end and more support coming from residents of the mountain. The OLG rejected the idea for a referendum due to time constraints, leading the city's lottery and gaming commission to opt for telephone polls and public meetings to decide on the issue.

=== Light rail transit ===
Since 2008, city council and Metrolinx, the transit agency responsible for projects across the Toronto and Hamilton areas, have been developing plans for a new rapid transit system in Hamilton to ease congestion on the city's Hamilton Street Railway (HSR) system. Early discussions resulted in a rapid transit feasibility study that pointed toward light rail transit (LRT) as the preferred system. In September, 2008, a city-commissioned survey found that 94% of Hamiltonians surveyed supported investment in rapid transit with 66% supporting LRT, 8% favouring bus rapid transit (BRT), and 20% endorsing either option.

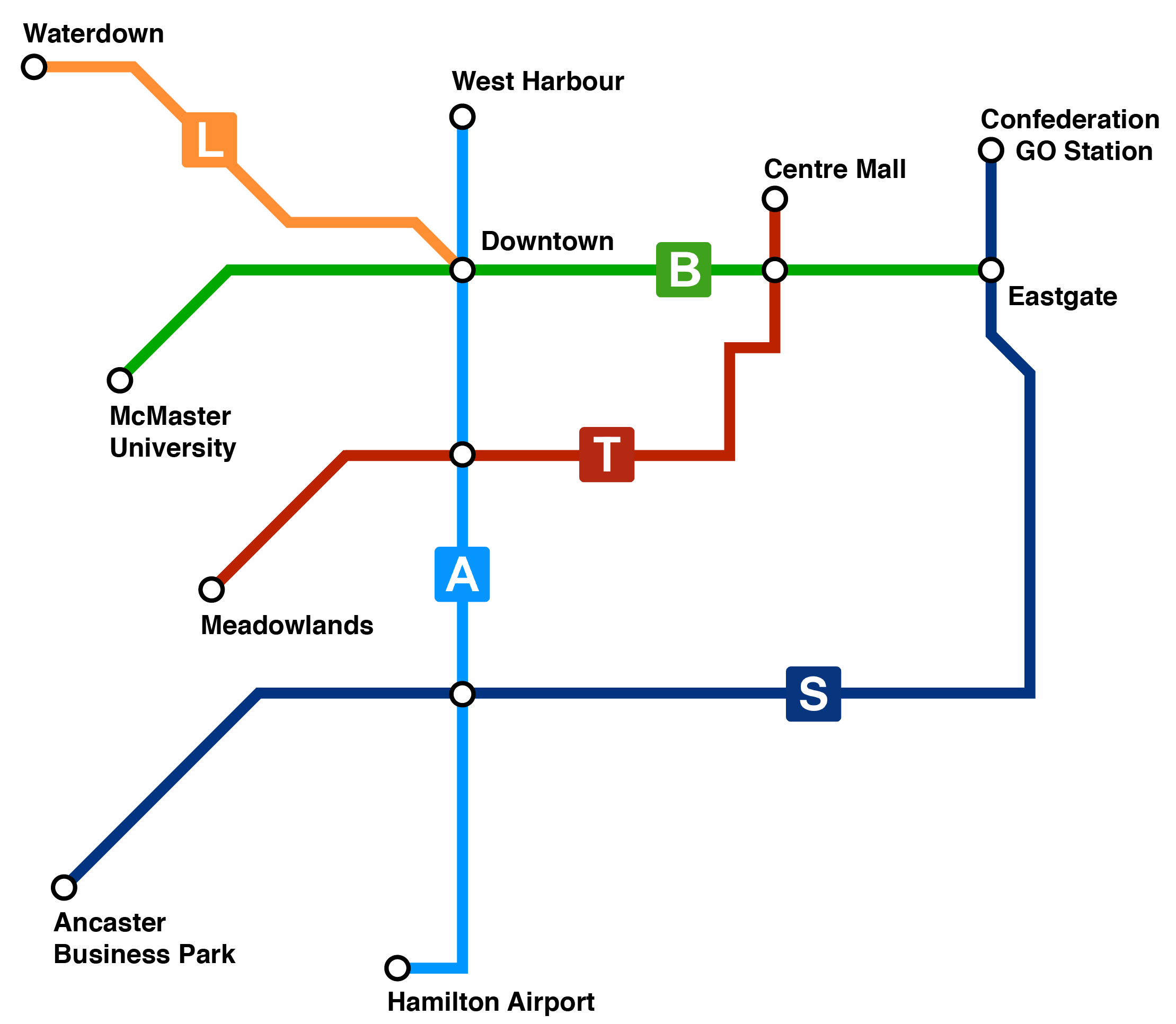
The proposed BLAST network in Hamilton

Plans for an LRT system moved ahead in 2008 when Hamilton City Council endorsed what became known as the BLAST network, an acronym for the 5 lines that would comprise Hamilton's rapid transit system. Despite original hopes that the provincial government would cover the entire cost of the project, research began to show that the city would be responsible for approximately 15% of the costs. Consultations began across the city and included McMaster students and community groups to poll locations for stations and train frequency.

Community groups quickly established positions on the issue. Both the Downtown Hamilton Business Improvement Area and the International Village BIA stated their support for the project, though they expressed concerns about the possibility of closing part of King Street East to automobile traffic. Gord Thompson, a local pawn shop owner was quoted as saying, "When you talk about closing down the street from Wellington, that's the entrance to the business area and that scares the hell out of us." At the same time, a poll of McMaster students found the campus to be extremely supportive of the project, with 85% of students who did not use transit regularly indicating they would begin using the HSR more frequently if an LRT line was available.

In August 2010, BRT advocates began pushing of the city to reconsider their commitment to LRT, citing lower costs and case studies from other municipalities. These claims were challenged by urban planners, economists, and some local business owners who believed the long-term economic benefits of LRT far outweighed the initial costs and infrastructure expenditures.

During the 2010 election campaign, then-candidate Bratina announced his support for the city to push for construction of the A-Line route from LIUNA Station on James Street North to the John C. Munro Hamilton International Airport in Mount Hope. Then-mayor Eisenberger and former mayor DiIanni endorsed the existing plan.

After the election, the city updated their BLAST plan to reflect the concerns made by the community, which brought more business leaders on-side with the plan. In 2011, though, all non-essential work on LRT was halted, prompting Ward 2 councillor Jason Farr to submit a motion requesting council reaffirm its support for LRT. In September, Bratina told CHML host Bill Kelly that LRT was not a priority, though the city was not abandoning plans to implement rapid transit. During the 2011 provincial election, then-Premier Dalton McGuinty told the Hamilton Spectator that he and Bratina had been corresponding about the mayor's preference for increased funding for GO Transit service into the city.

Despite this, in 2012, Metrolinx announced that Hamilton's LRT plan was one of the agency's top priorities. In 2013, debate over LRT became heated when Councillor Farr accused Bratina of intimidating city staff. The accusation was followed by the councillor shouting at the mayor, which led to Ward Four Councillor Sam Merulla to request an in-camera discussion regarding the mayor's behaviour. After the incident, council re-affirmed support for LRT and requested that the province support 100% funding for the project.

== Mayoral election ==
=== Campaign ===
Ward One councillor Brian McHattie was the first candidate to officially announce his interest in running for mayor, telling the Spectator's Andrew Dreschel in August 2013 that he was forming an exploratory committee and would know whether a campaign was possible in October 2013. On September 30, 2013, McHattie announced that he would be running for mayor on the Laircast, a local podcast. He was the first candidate to file for election on January 2, 2014, saying, "It's time for a different kind of Hamilton."

Despite initially announcing his intention to run for Ward 3 councillor, Michael Baldasaro posted a picture to the social networking site Facebook indicating he would seek the office of mayor. He filed to run for Mayor on January 2, 2014.

On March 13, Hamilton Spectator columnist Andrew Dreschel reported that senior Liberal Party insiders confirmed Bob Bratina would not seek another term as mayor, opting to contest the party's federal nomination in Hamilton Centre. The following day, Bratina officially announced that he would not seek re-election on AM 900 CHML.

The following Monday, March 17, Ward Nine councillor Brad Clark filed to run for the mayoralty. Discussing his decision to run with local media, Clark said he would focus his campaign on creating jobs, attracting new businesses, and ensuring no municipal tax dollars are spent on light rail transit.

After months of stating he was interested in another bid for the city's mayoralty, former mayor Fred Eisenberger told the media on March 27 that he would file nomination papers the following day. Flanked by supporters and family, he registered on March 28, telling reporters "We have a need to fix our commercial and industrial tax base... The tax base is declining and continues to. We need to turn that around."

On March 31, embattled Ontario Taxi Workers Union present Ejaz Butt registered to run for mayor, months after a year-long battle over the direction of his union ended with his reinstatement at its head. The same day, 2003 mayoral candidate and 2010 Ward Two council race runner-up Matt Jelly announced that he would run for mayor again. Spectator reporter Dan Nolan later wrote on Twitter that Jelly's announcement was revealed to be an elaborate April Fools' Day prank.

On Thursday, April 3, American late night television host Jimmy Kimmel discussed the Hamilton mayoral race, particularly Butt's recently announced candidacy. Poking fun at Butt's name, Kimmel asked his audience: "Will someone please steal me one of his lawn signs?" Butt later said that the joke was very funny. "It makes me laugh", Butt told the Spectator, "I am not offended. I love my Butt – it will always be behind me."

On April 14, former Ward 8 councillor Don Ross announced that he would be dropping out of the mayoral race. In his statement to the press, Ross indicated that he did not want to draw support away from any candidate who could change the direction of council.

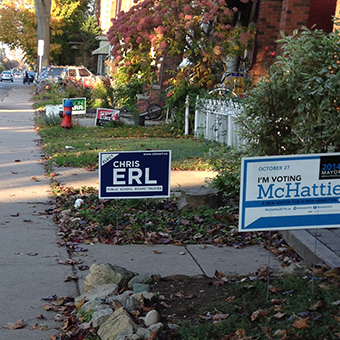
Election signs on lawns in Hamilton's Ward Two

On July 2, McHattie announced that he would be visiting all of the city's nearly 200 neighbourhoods in 100 days, commenting that he wanted "to understand each neighbourhood – what's it's like to live there, what it's like to raise a family." His announcement was criticized sharply by Eisenberger's campaign manager, Chris Cutler, who tweeted, "Welcome to the campaign Brian. We were wondering where you were. Campaigning for mayor means leaving your ward." This incident sparked a series of aggressive tweets on both sides and was covered in the Spectator by columnist Andrew Dreschel.

In September, local affairs website raisethehammer.org contacted candidates seeking feedback on Clark's stance against LRT. Ricky Tavares, who had registered on August 8, responded by demanding Ryan McGreal, the site's editor, purchase marijuana seeds from him and demanded proof of purchase before he would interact with the media.

Following Tavares' unconventional request and the decision on the part of a business coalition to invite only McHattie, Eisenberger, and Clark to a mayoral forum on September 18, local media began discussing the seriousness of many candidates, with Spectator columnist Andrew Dreschel writing that contender Nick Iamonico had called inquiring as to why he was not being considered a frontrunner. At the forum, the three contenders debated a host of issues. Eisenberger and McHattie both expressing their support for LRT, while Clark favoured a referendum on LRT and a bus rapid transit plan. All candidates indicated their support for redrawing ward boundaries for the 2018 Municipal Election and attempted to highlight their opponent's controversial positions and values, including McHattie's opposition to a proposed suburban business park around the Hamilton International Airport, Eisenberger's past difficulties in managing council, and Clark's ties to the Ontario Progressive Conservatives and government of Mike Harris.

As the election drew closer, the campaigns between the three frontrunners became heated. In late September, the Clark campaign began attacking the record of Eisenberger while he served as mayor, claiming he misled the public on LRT and withholding information during negotiations with Metrolinx, Ontario's regional transit agency. The Eisenberger camp returned with endorsements from former mayors Larry Di Ianni and Bob Morrow, who had been serving as Ward Three councillor since the death of sitting councillor Bernie Morelli. Outgoing Mayor Bob Bratina announced that he would be supporting Clark.

In their interviews with the Spectator editorial board, the top three contenders outlined their platforms and highlighted key policies and positions they would take as mayor. Clark reiterated his opposition to LRT, saying a Clark mayoralty would focus on jobs and taxes. Eisenberger expressed a need to further study LRT, but ultimately gave the system his support, while also highlighting that he chose not to take firm positions on many issues to prevent losing a "potentially good project for our city." McHattie reiterated his support for LRT as an economic catalyst and creating jobs by reaching out directly to businesses A poll released a week before the vote indicated that Eisenberger had the support of 37% of voters, with Clark and McHattie sitting at a distant 25% and 22% respectively.

=== Platforms ===
Candidate	Platform
Fred Eisenberger	Attract new businesses and create a seamless process for business creation at City Hall; End poverty; Make regular investments in infrastructure; Expanding partnerships with businesses and other local governments; Consult with the community on issues relating to economic development; Support light rail transit and strike a 'citizen's jury' to study the issue and report back to the community; Renew Hamilton's waterfront development initiative through expediting the implementation of recommendations contained in existing plans, studies and reports; Improve municipal service delivery to restore faith in local government
Brad Clark	Ensure taxes are spent efficiently; Attract and retain high-paying jobs; Ensure council focuses on the suburban and Mountain areas of the city rather than on downtown exclusively; Improve customer service at City Hall; Promote bus rapid transit and a "SmartTransit" plan
Brian McHattie	Support entrepreneurs and ensuring better service delivery at City Hall; Protect Hamilton's environment; Support more funding for the A-Line express bus service; Change Hamilton's ward boundaries to better reflect the city's changing population; Change 'overly restrictive' rural zoning bylaws
Michael Baldasaro	Promote the legalization of marijuana; Initiate plebiscites on LRT, water fluoridation, and changing the Canadian constitution to allow children to vote; Get rid of 'crack houses' and 'unkempt properties'; Find ways to supply addicts with drugs; Increase development charges on new subdivisions; Licence bicyclists; Force police officers to purchase their own weaponry; Cut the mayor's salary by 1/3
Crystal Lavigne	Empower Hamiltonians to make change in their community; Connect with Hamilton's underprivileged communities; Support renewal in priority neighbourhoods
Ejaz Butt	Begin building LRT downtown; Provide more support to the city's taxi industry

=== Results ===
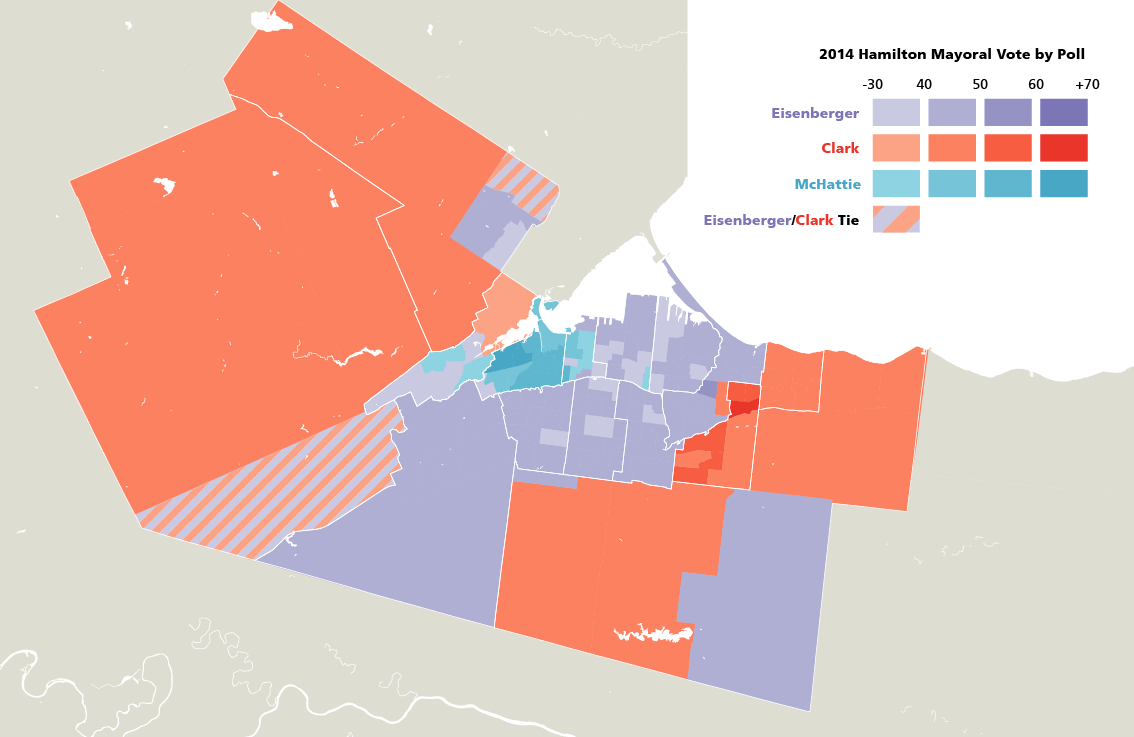
The winners in each poll for the 2014 Hamilton mayoral election with successful candidates in each polling division, graphically represented by a gradient indicating the level of the vote with which they won

Candidates for the October 27, 2014 Hamilton, Ontario mayoral election
Candidate	Popular vote			Expenditures
Candidate	Votes	%	±%	Expenditures
Fred Eisenberger	49,020	39.93%	+12.5%	$106,647.00
Brad Clark	38,706	31.53%	–	$152,236.05
Brian McHattie	25,020	20.38%	–	$129,341.11
Michael Baldasaro	3,518	2.87%	+0.82%	$0
Crystal Lavigne	1,910	1.56%	–	$0
Ejaz Butt	1,579	1.29%	–	n/a^{1}
Mike Clancy	821	0.67%	–	$309.19
Michael A. Pattison	763	0.62%	–	$1,095.12
Nick Iamonico	444	0.36%	–	n/a^{1}
Ricky Tavares	428	0.35%	–	$0
Warrand Francis	278	0.23%	–	n/a^{1}
Phil Ryerson	269	0.22%	–	$0
Total votes	122,756	33.53%	−6.92%	
Registered voters	366,124	100%	n/a	
^{1} These candidates did not submit official financial statements and were therefore ineligible to run in the 2018 municipal election. Note: All Hamilton municipal elections are officially non-partisan. Note: Candidate campaign colours are based on the prominent colour used in campaign items (signs, literature, etc.) and are used as a visual differentiation between candidates.
Sources: City of Hamilton, "Nominated Candidates" Archived 2010-08-20 at the Wayback Machine

=== Declined ===
Individuals listed in this section were the focus of media speculation as being possible mayoral candidates but ruled out seeking the position or did not register before the September 12 deadline.

- Sophia Aggelonitis, former Hamilton Mountain MPP
- Laura Babcock, TV producer and communications professional
- Marie Bountrogianni, former Liberal MPP, Hamilton Mountain and provincial cabinet minister
- Teresa Cascioli, entrepreneur and former head of Lakeport Brewing
- Mark Chamberlain, president of Trivaris Inc.
- Chris Charlton, NDP MP, Hamilton Mountain
- David Christopherson, NDP deputy leader and MP, Hamilton Centre
- Chad Collins, Ward Five councillor
- Terry Cooke, former regional chair, Hamilton-Wentworth
- Lloyd Ferguson, Ward Twelve councillor, was named as an early contender. On August 26, 2013, Spectator columnist Andrew Dreschel wrote that Ferguson was "virtually guaranteed to be on the mayoral ballot." On Monday, April 7, Ferguson announced that he would not seek the mayoralty, opting to run again for council in his Ancaster ward.
- Andrea Horwath, leader of the Ontario New Democratic Party and MPP for Hamilton Centre
- Tom Jackson, Ward Six councillor
- Ted McMeekin, Ancaster—Dundas—Flambrough—Westdale MPP and minister of Agriculture
- Robert Pasuta, Ward Fourteen councillor
- Donna Skelly, Progressive Conservative candidate for MPP, Ancaster—Dundas—Flambrough—Westdale
- Terry Whitehead, Ward Eight councillor

== City council election ==
=== Ward One (Chedoke-Cootes) ===

The race for Ward One was underscored by the decision by incumbent Councillor Brian McHattie to seek the mayoralty. In October 2013, Spectator columnist Andrew Dreschel wrote about candidates considering bids, including past candidate and Locke Street Business Improvement Area member Tony Greco, and Deirdre Pike, senior social planner at Hamilton's Social Planning and Research Council (SPRC).

Kirkendall neighbourhood resident Jason Allen was the first to announce his intention to seeking the vacant seat on September 4, 2013. He officially registered on January 2, 2014. Ira Rosen, vice-president of the Ainslie Wood-Westdale Community Association of Resident Homeowners, had indicated to Dreschel in late 2013 that he would be a candidate for councillor in Ward One and registered on January 7. In February, executive with the FirstOntario Credit Union, Sandy Shaw, announced her candidacy. Shaw, a former Woman of Distinction award winner, had worked closely with the SPRC in the past and was supported in her bid by Pike.

Aidan Johnson, staff lawyer with Hamilton Legal Aid announced his decision to run in Ward 1 in May, 2014. Formerly an employee of Ontario's Ministry of the Attorney General and Fulbright scholar at New York University, Johnson's bid was supported by the local Liberal Party establishment and featured endorsements from figures such as Sheila Copps and Bob Rae. The candidates were joined by Greco and former-Hamilton Bulldogs executive Brian Lewis prior to the close of nominations in September.

In late September, the Ainslie Wood/Westdale Community Association, a local group noted for its opposition to student housing around McMaster University, hosted a debate at St. Mary's Catholic High School in Ainslie Wood, during which the candidates outlined their platforms while speaking highly of the accomplishments outgoing Councillor McHattie had achieved during his time in office.

On election night, Johnson took 34.69% of the popular vote and became Hamilton's first openly gay city councillor.

Candidates for the October 27, 2014 Hamilton, Ontario Ward One councillor election
Candidate	Popular vote			Expenditures
Candidate	Votes	%	±%	Expenditures
Aidan Johnson	3,030	34.69%	–	$20,215.71
Sandy Shaw	2,390	27.36%	–	$21,412.40
Jason Allen	1,050	12.02%	–	$9,286.10
Tony Greco	1,024	11.72%	−14.7%	n/a^{1}
Brian Lewis	641	7.34%	–	$9,101.20
Ira Rosen	600	6.87%	–	$14,583.76
Total votes	8,870	40.74%	+.04%	
Registered voters	21,770	100%		
^{1} These candidates did not submit official financial statements and were therefore ineligible to run in the 2018 municipal election. Note: All Hamilton municipal elections are officially non-partisan. Note: Candidate campaign colours are based on the prominent colour used in campaign items (signs, literature, etc.) and are used as a visual differentiation between candidates.
Sources: City of Hamilton, "Nominated Candidates" Archived 2010-08-20 at the Wayback Machine

=== Ward Two (Downtown) ===

The Ward Two race was the focus of early speculation when local business owner Cameron Bailey announced that he would be running for the seat in 2013. Notable for causing a public uproar over his displaying of the Confederate flag, Bailey launched a campaign website and began holding meetings well before the opening of nominations in 2014. His announcement came after a public battle with city officials over the payment of a $2000 licensing fee for his restaurant, Hillbilly Heaven. Bailey had, in the past, caused some controversy over his use of the Confederate flag above his King Street East storefront and his signs declaring his store refused to serve Halal meat. Bailey's website says his campaign would be pro-business, and seek to reduce crime in the downtown core. In late 2013, Bailey's King Street restaurant shut down. Bailey failed to register for the election in 2014 and did not campaign on behalf of any other candidate during the election.

The first person to register for the race was local singer Ivana Nosic. Nosic remained in the election until April 10 when she withdrew for unknown reasons. Lynda Hykin, also an early entrant, withdrew on May 1. Hess Street resident Ed Dallas registered on April 14 and, after Nosic and Hykin withdrew, was the sole contender for the seat until June 3 when incumbent councillor Jason Farr registered to run for a second term. Dallas' campaign focused on improving the area around Pier 4, better maintaining municipal golf courses, and supporting a downtown casino.

Farr's campaign focused on continuing his work from the 2010–2014 term of office, promoting further waterfront redevelopment, and supporting the area's arts community.

On July 17, Terri Wallis, a citizen member of Hamilton's municipal Advisory Committee for Persons with Disabilities, registered to run for city council. Wallis' candidacy sparked a discussion about accessibility in Hamilton, as she would not be able to access many of Hamilton City Hall's rooms and offices without assistance due to design issues. Wallis campaigned on a platform of supporting accessibility concerns, better supporting affordable housing, and being more attentive to constituent concerns. Though initially in favour of LRT, Wallis support for the project wavered and her campaign was unsupportive of the King Street bus only lane, advocating her own transit plan, a "C-Line" express bus service along Barton Street.

Perennial candidate Kristina Heaton, local resident Ryan Henry, and 2014 Progressive Conservative candidate for Hamilton Centre, John Vail, also sought the downtown seat. Heaton's campaign focused on opposing LRT, the downtown bus lane, and traffic calming measures, which she claimed were dangerous and anti-business. Heaton also campaigned on expropriating derelict buildings and using them as training centres for marginalized populations. Vail's campaign focused on reducing densities downtown, stopping local subsidies for high-density development, and lowering taxes as a way to help bring people out of poverty.

On election night, despite a steep decline in voter turnout, Farr was reelected with nearly 2/3 of the popular vote and over 3,200 votes above his nearest challenger, Wallis.

Candidates for the October 27, 2014 Hamilton, Ontario Ward Two councillor election
Candidate	Popular vote			Expenditures
Candidate	Votes	%	±%	Expenditures
Jason Farr (incumbent)	4,078	66.35%	+45.38%	$20,156.95
Terri Wallis	786	12.79%	–	$4,458.35
Kristina Heaton	658	10.71%	–	$0
John Vail	373	6.07%	–	$2,608.70
Ed Dallas	143	2.33%	–	n/a^{1}
Ryan Henry	108	1.76%	–	n/a^{1}
Total votes	6,389	29.04%	−11.39%	
Registered voters	21,997	100%		
^{1} These candidates did not submit official financial statements and were therefore ineligible to run in the 2018 municipal election. Note: All Hamilton municipal elections are officially non-partisan. Note: Candidate campaign colours are based on the prominent colour used in campaign items (signs, literature, etc.) and are used as a visual differentiation between candidates.
Sources: City of Hamilton, "Nominated Candidates" Archived 2010-08-20 at the Wayback Machine

=== Ward Three (Hamilton Centre) ===

The early days of the Ward Three race were marked by the prolonged illness of incumbent Councillor Bernie Morelli. 33-year-old entrepreneur Matthew Green was the first to indicate he would seek election, telling CBC Hamilton he would run for council in Ward Three on October 26, 2013. Green's announcement was confirmed in a later CHML interview with Ted Michaels. Indicating that he wanted to make the announcement well before incumbent councillor Bernie Morelli decided if he would seek re-election, Green became the first candidate to file for the election on January 2, 2014. Green's campaign focused on safe streets, improving park infrastructure in the area, and conducting a comprehensive study of the city's transportation network.

In November 2013, Dreschel tweeted that Ward Three Catholic school board trustee Ralph Agostino would run for council if incumbent councillor Bernie Morelli was unable to stand for election. Agostino registered on February 13 after announcing his decision to run a day earlier. Agostino campaigned on a platform of rejuvenating Barton Street, holding more community meetings, and uploading service costs to the provincial government.

Near the end of November, 2013, Ward Three Public School Board trustee Tim Simmons announced that he would be standing down as chair of the Hamilton-Wentworth District School Board to consider a run for Ward Three councillor. Simmons registered to run for council on January 6, 2014. In his campaign, Simmons spoke of wanting to create a municipal 'Housing Officer' and supporting more investment in express bus service prior to the completion of LRT.

Green and Simmons were among the announced candidates when Morelli died on January 14, 2014. Writing about his life, Spectator columnist Andrew Dreschel noted his illness, his successes, and controversies, while making note of the void that would be left by his passing. Following Morelli's passing, the number of candidates for the vacant seat increased substantially, with 15 candidates registering by the September 12 deadline.

The campaign for council in Ward Three proved to be one of the most tense in the city, with a series of incidents marking the race to replace Morelli. In February 2014, candidate Bob Assadourian illegally used City of Hamilton logos and imagery on campaign advertisements that implied he was already the Ward Three councillor. During a mayoral debate in early October, a question was posed to candidates about gender equality and, when a number of candidates responded with misogynistic language, a community activist tried to interrupt the proceedings. Catholic school trustee candidate Anthony Perri shouted the activist down and Green live-tweeted the incident. Perri subsequently threatened Green with legal action over his tweets. Candidate Mark DiMillo's office was twice the target of burglary, which he attributed to the social issues at play in the community, rather than to sabotage from another campaign. In late October, Agostino issued a statement claiming candidate Drina Omazic's campaign literature had plagiarized a flyer from his late brother Dominic Agostino and distributed it in the community on the former MPP's birthday. A YouTube video claimed to be linked to the hacktivist group Anonymous surfaced in October, claiming Green was running for office in a Freemason-inspired plot to dominate the city. Days before the election, Assadourian again came under fire for releasing an advertisement that claimed he was already the Ward Three councillor.

At advance polls in the area, a number of complaints were filed by multiple candidates about perceived irregularities, including campaign signs and vehicles located too close to polling stations and campaign supporters intimidating voters prior to their casting ballots. At an advance poll in Pinky Lewis Community Centre, a physical altercation erupted after a voter claimed another elector was displaying Green campaign material inside the polling station. Green expressed concern that one of his supporters was attacked while Assadourian claimed the woman did not intend to vote, but rather wanted to intimidate voters at the polling station. An investigation by the city's Elections Manager found no irregularities.

The campaigns of candidates across Ward Three were varied, with contenders running on diverse platforms focusing on distinct issues. Candidate Eva John focused on reducing chlorine in the city's water supply, Victor Mejia advocated a seniors' centre and express bus along Barton Street, Carlos Pinho called on business owners to donate 10% of their earnings to the community, Byron Wayne Millette campaigned on the idea of a 5,000-seat hockey arena in Ward Three, and Brian Kelly proposed a McMaster-to-south Mountain LRT line. Assadourian campaigned on a platform of BRT, donating 1/4 of his salary to the runner-up in the council election, removing what he called the "toxic substance" of fluoride from Hamilton's water, and not having any educational experience, which he cited as the reason "City Hall is in a mess!"

On election night, Green won the ward easily, earning over 40% of the popular vote and over 1,600 more votes than the runner-up, Agostino. Despite the interest in the race and the number of candidates, voter turnout still dropped below 30%.

Candidates for the October 27, 2014 Hamilton, Ontario Ward Three councillor election
Candidate	Popular vote			Expenditures
Candidate	Votes	%	±%	Expenditures
Matthew Green	2,852	40.72%	–	$31,380.20
Ralph Agostino	1,229	17.55%	–	$22,900.91
Drina Omazic	825	11.78%	–	$27,000.76
Mark DiMillo	525	7.50%	−2.63%	n/a^{1}
Sean Gibson	361	5.15%	−8.53%	n/a^{1}
Tim Simmons	334	4.77%	–	$15,087.14
Bob Assadourian	330	4.71%	–	$26,412.29
Brian Kelly	172	2.46%	–	$5,670.73
Maria Anastasiou	93	1.33%	–	n/a^{1}
Byron Wayne Millette	73	1.04%	–	n/a^{1}
Eva John	55	0.79%	–	n/a^{1}
Carlos Pinho	51	0.73%	–	n/a^{1}
Victor Mejia	42	0.60%	–	n/a^{1}
Bernie Szajkowski	41	0.59%	–	$0
Jol Hess	21	0.30%	–	n/a^{1}
Total votes	7,113	29.59%	−1.41	
Registered voters	24,035	100%		
^{1} These candidates did not submit official financial statements and were therefore ineligible to run in the 2018 municipal election. Note: All Hamilton municipal elections are officially non-partisan. Note: Candidate campaign colours are based on the prominent colour used in campaign items (signs, literature, etc.) and are used as a visual differentiation between candidates.
Sources: City of Hamilton, "Nominated Candidates" Archived 2010-08-20 at the Wayback Machine

=== Ward Four (East Hamilton) ===

Incumbent councillor Sam Merulla told CBC Hamilton that he would seek election in 2014, hoping to file his nomination papers on January 2. Due to extreme weather, Merulla filed on January 3.

Activist Lorna Moreau registered to run against Merulla on July 11. In a Spectator editorial on July 28, Moreau outlined her reasons for running and the platform she would be standing on. Indicating that she was "disillusioned with [her] city councillor and city hall on the whole", Moreau said she would be campaigning on a platform of addressing capital spending deficits, opposing LRT, starting resident-led committees, helping seniors stay in their homes, tackling air quality issues, and hiring student veterinarians to spay and neuter the stray animals in the ward. Moreau also waded into the school board election by noting that she wanted to see more equality in education and school spaces used for job retraining and community events.

Candidates for the October 27, 2014 Hamilton, Ontario Ward Four councillor election
Candidate	Popular vote			Expenditures
Candidate	Votes	%	±%	Expenditures
Sam Merulla (incumbent)	5,654	82.49%	+.08	$28,042.00
Tina Whalen	563	8.21%	–	n/a^{1}
Lorna Moreau	407	5.94%	–	$996.22
John Laurie	230	3.36%	–	n/a^{1}
Total votes	6,956	29.87%	−5.63%	
Registered voters	23,287	100%		
^{1} These candidates did not submit official financial statements and were therefore ineligible to run in the 2018 municipal election. Note: All Hamilton municipal elections are officially non-partisan. Note: Candidate campaign colours are based on the prominent colour used in campaign items (signs, literature, etc.) and are used as a visual differentiation between candidates.
Sources: City of Hamilton, "Nominated Candidates" Archived 2010-08-20 at the Wayback Machine

=== Ward Five (Redhill) ===

Candidates for the October 27, 2014 Hamilton, Ontario Ward Five councillor election
Candidate	Popular vote			Expenditures
Candidate	Votes	%	±%	Expenditures
Chad Collins (incumbent)	6,138	71.58%	+4.66%	$22,484.82
David Brown	1,134	13.22%	–	$11,977.84
George Rusich	1,133	13.21%	–	$4,305.38
Larry Storm	170	1.98%	–	$453.27
Total votes	8,723	33.64%	−7.66%	
Registered voters	25,929	100%		
^{1} These candidates did not submit official financial statements and were therefore ineligible to run in the 2018 municipal election. Note: All Hamilton municipal elections are officially non-partisan. Note: Candidate campaign colours are based on the prominent colour used in campaign items (signs, literature, etc.) and are used as a visual differentiation between candidates.
Sources: City of Hamilton, "Nominated Candidates" Archived 2010-08-20 at the Wayback Machine

=== Ward Six (East Mountain) ===

26-year council veteran Tom Jackson told Mark Newman of Hamilton Community News in January, 2014 that he intended to seek re-election. Jackson registered to run for a ninth term on July 3, 2014.

Brad Olynchuk, the first candidate to register in the ward, withdrew from the race on March 24. Then, on September 11, he again filed to run in Ward Six. The reasoning for his withdrawal and renomination was not made public.

Candidates for the October 27, 2014 Hamilton, Ontario Ward Six councillor election
Candidate	Popular vote			Expenditures
Candidate	Votes	%	±%	Expenditures
Tom Jackson (incumbent)	7,886	80.83%	+25.93%	$63,130.32
Dan Rodrigues	1,125	11.53%	–	n/a^{1}
Brad Olynchuk	745	7.64%	–	$0
Total votes	9,883	35.15%	−7.95%	
Registered voters	28,116			
^{1} These candidates did not submit official financial statements and were therefore ineligible to run in the 2018 municipal election. Note: All Hamilton municipal elections are officially non-partisan. Note: Candidate campaign colours are based on the prominent colour used in campaign items (signs, literature, etc.) and are used as a visual differentiation between candidates.
Sources: City of Hamilton, "Nominated Candidates" Archived 2010-08-20 at the Wayback Machine

=== Ward Seven (Central Mountain) ===

Candidates for the October 27, 2014 Hamilton, Ontario Ward Seven councillor election
Candidate	Popular vote			Expenditures
Candidate	Votes	%	±%	Expenditures
Scott Duvall (incumbent)	9,956	79.12%	+21.51%	$16,626.25
Keith Beck	1,562	12.41%	+7.27	$0
Greg Burghall	1,065	8.46%	–	n/a^{1}
Total votes	13,068	31.75%	−8.15%	
Registered voters				
^{1} These candidates did not submit official financial statements and were therefore ineligible to run in the 2018 municipal election. Note: All Hamilton municipal elections are officially non-partisan. Note: Candidate campaign colours are based on the prominent colour used in campaign items (signs, literature, etc.) and are used as a visual differentiation between candidates.
Sources: City of Hamilton, "Nominated Candidates" Archived 2010-08-20 at the Wayback Machine

=== Ward Eight (West Mountain) ===

The first candidate to register in the West Mountain race was Jimmy Dean, who filed his nomination papers on March 21. Speaking with the Mountain News, Dean indicated that he opposed the city's proposed LRT, wanted to see better road maintenance, and expressed a desire to examine community snow-removal for seniors.

Candidates for the October 27, 2014 Hamilton, Ontario Ward Eight councillor election
Candidate	Popular vote			Expenditures
Candidate	Votes	%	±%	Expenditures
Terry Whitehead (incumbent)	9,364	76.54%	+9.17%	$29,517.87
Joshua Peter Czerniga	2,870	23.46%	–	n/a^{1}
Total votes	12,554	36.29%		
Registered voters				
^{1} These candidates did not submit official financial statements and were therefore ineligible to run in the 2018 municipal election. Note: All Hamilton municipal elections are officially non-partisan. Note: Candidate campaign colours are based on the prominent colour used in campaign items (signs, literature, etc.) and are used as a visual differentiation between candidates.
Sources: City of Hamilton, "Nominated Candidates" Archived 2010-08-20 at the Wayback Machine

=== Ward Nine (Upper Stoney Creek) ===

The Ward Nine council race opened in earnest when sitting councillor and former MPP Brad Clark surprised observers by quietly registering to contest the mayoralty following Bob Bratina's announcement that he would not seek a second term in office. The first candidate to register was Marie Robbins, a local resident, former owner of Smith-McKay Florists, and founder of the Jamesville Business Improvement Area on March 31. On May 8, 19-year-old McMaster University student Cam Galindo registered to run in Stoney Creek. Doug Conley, a former councillor in the now defunct City of Stoney Creek, registered the next day. Also of note was the registration of former mayoral candidate and actor Tone Morrone on July 28.

Candidates for the October 27, 2014 Hamilton, Ontario Ward Nine councillor election
Candidate	Popular vote			Expenditures
Candidate	Votes	%	±%	Expenditures
Doug Conley	1,750	26.17%	–	$17,842.99
Nancy Fiorentino	1,381	20.66%	−10.09%	$7,097.31
Cam Galindo	1,294	19.35%	–	$7,273.19
Marie Robbins	1,063	15.90%	–	$12,927.68
Geraldine McMullen	682	10.20%	−2.91%	$18,974.15
Tone Marrone	194	2.90%	–	n/a^{1}
Frank Rukavina	189	2.83%	–	$157.89
Lee Austin	81	1.21%	–	n/a^{1}
Christopher Rosser	52	0.78%	–	n/a^{1}
Total votes	6,826	34.20%	−6.1%	
Registered voters				
^{1} These candidates did not submit official financial statements and were therefore ineligible to run in the 2018 municipal election. Note: All Hamilton municipal elections are officially non-partisan. Note: Candidate campaign colours are based on the prominent colour used in campaign items (signs, literature, etc.) and are used as a visual differentiation between candidates.
Sources: City of Hamilton, "Nominated Candidates" Archived 2010-08-20 at the Wayback Machine

=== Ward Ten (Lower Stoney Creek) ===
Candidates for the October 27, 2014 Hamilton, Ontario Ward Ten councillor election
Candidate	Popular vote			Expenditures
Candidate	Votes	%	±%	Expenditures
Maria Pearson (incumbent)	4,090	58.03%	−5.82%	$19,436.79
Teresa DiFalco	2,390	33.91%	–	$16,957.88
Luana Yachetti	568	8.06%	–	$5,586.28
Total votes	7,145	37.4%	−7.93%	
Registered voters	19,106			
^{1} These candidates did not submit official financial statements and were therefore ineligible to run in the 2018 municipal election. Note: All Hamilton municipal elections are officially non-partisan. Note: Candidate campaign colours are based on the prominent colour used in campaign items (signs, literature, etc.) and are used as a visual differentiation between candidates.
Sources: City of Hamilton, "Nominated Candidates" Archived 2010-08-20 at the Wayback Machine

=== Ward Eleven (Glanbrook Winona) ===
Summary of the October 27, 2014 Hamilton, Ontario Ward Eleven councillor election
Candidate	Popular vote			Expenditures
Candidate	Votes	%	±%	Expenditures
Brenda Johnson (incumbent)	7,873	83.45%	+41.31%	$13,065.70
Vincenzo Rigitano	1,561	16.55%	–	$5,321.11
Total votes	9,562	33.61%	−9.69%	
Registered voters	28,451			
^{1} These candidates did not submit official financial statements and were therefore ineligible to run in the 2018 municipal election. Note: All Hamilton municipal elections are officially non-partisan. Note: Candidate campaign colours are based on the prominent colour used in campaign items (signs, literature, etc.) and are used as a visual differentiation between candidates.
Sources: Hamilton, Ontario, City Clerk's Office Archived 2010-08-20 at the Wayback Machine

=== Ward Twelve (Ancaster) ===
Summary of the October 27, 2014 Hamilton, Ontario Ward Twelve councillor election
Candidate	Popular vote			Expenditures
Candidate	Votes	%	±%	Expenditures
Lloyd Ferguson (incumbent)	7,313	78.75%	+5.47%	$36,072.46
John F.F. Iachelli	727	7.83%	–	$5,864.88
Grace Bryson	650	7.00%	–	$1,200.62
Anthony Nicholl	596	6.42%	–	$1,214.59
Total votes	9,445	35.90%	−4.8%	
Registered voters	26,309			
^{1} These candidates did not submit official financial statements and were therefore ineligible to run in the 2018 municipal election. Note: All Hamilton municipal elections are officially non-partisan. Note: Candidate campaign colours are based on the prominent colour used in campaign items (signs, literature, etc.) and are used as a visual differentiation between candidates.
Sources: Hamilton, Ontario, City Clerk's Office Archived 2010-08-20 at the Wayback Machine

=== Ward Thirteen (Dundas) ===
Danya Scime, runner up to incumbent Russ Powers in the 2010 election, was first to file on January 20, 2014.

On June 26, 2014, incumbent councillor Russ Powers announced that he would be retiring from municipal politics after serving for 27 years as a town councillor in Dundas, regional councillor in the former region of Hamilton-Wentworth, and as Ancaster—Dundas—Flamborough—Westdale MP from 2004 to 2006. Cited as a potential Liberal nominee for the newly created riding of Hamilton West-Ancaster-Dundas, Powers told the Spectator that he was keeping his mind open on running for office in 2015, but was looking forward to enjoying retirement when his term ended in December, 2014.

Immediately after his announcement, a number of Dundas residents announced their intentions to stand for council. Local businesswoman Toby Yull and Powers' executive assistant and former federal Liberal candidate in Ancaster-Dundas-Flambrough-Westdale Arlene Vanderbeek both announced their intention to stand on July 2, 2014. Yull filed to run the following day, along with local resident and automotive engineer Marc Risdale.

Candidates for the October 27, 2014 Hamilton, Ontario Ward Thirteen councillor election
Candidate	Popular vote			Expenditures
Candidate	Votes	%	±%	Expenditures
Arlene Vanderbeek	3,468	42.56%	–	$20,475.72
Toby Yull	1,988	24.40%	–	$11,673.01
Rick Court	1,285	15.77%	–	$16,479.08
Danya Scime	516	6.33%	−14.92%	n/a^{1}
Marc Rhéal Risdale	397	4.87%	–	$4,561.53
Mark Coull	283	3.47%	–	$1,431.72
Pam Mitchell	82	1.01%	–	$0
Kevin Norton	77	0.94%	–	$0
Christeen Urquhart	53	0.65%	–	$0
Total votes	8,258	43.79%	−2.04%	
Registered voters	18,859			
^{1} These candidates did not submit official financial statements and were therefore ineligible to run in the 2018 municipal election. Note: All Hamilton municipal elections are officially non-partisan. Note: Candidate campaign colours are based on the prominent colour used in campaign items (signs, literature, etc.) and are used as a visual differentiation between candidates.
Sources: Hamilton, Ontario, City Clerk's Office Archived 2010-08-20 at the Wayback Machine

=== Ward Fourteen (Wentworth) ===
Candidates for the October 27, 2014 Hamilton, Ontario Ward Fourteen councillor election
Candidate	Popular vote			Expenditures
Candidate	Votes	%	±%	Expenditures
Robert Pasuta (incumbent)	3,451	85.38%	–^{2}	$12,677.09
Scott Stewart	421	10.42%	–	$3,032.65
Steven Knowles	170	4.21%	–	n/a^{1}
Total votes	4,119	33.41%	–^{2}	
Registered voters	12,329			
^{1} These candidates did not submit official financial statements and were therefore ineligible to run in the 2018 municipal election.^{2} Robert Pasuta was acclaimed in the 2014 Municipal election Note: All Hamilton municipal elections are officially non-partisan. Note: Candidate campaign colours are based on the prominent colour used in campaign items (signs, literature, etc.) and are used as a visual differentiation between candidates.
Sources: Hamilton, Ontario, City Clerk's Office Archived 2010-08-20 at the Wayback Machine

=== Ward Fifteen (Flamborough) ===
Candidates for the October 27, 2014 Hamilton, Ontario Ward Fifteen councillor election
Candidate	Popular vote			Expenditures
Candidate	Votes	%	±%	Expenditures
Judi Partridge (incumbent)	3,879	69.23%	+16.51%	$17,600.00
Neil Bos	1,724	30.77%	−12.18%	$5,358.57
Total votes	5,639	27.88%	−7.19%	
Registered voters	20,227			
^{1} These candidates did not submit official financial statements and were therefore ineligible to run in the 2018 municipal election. Note: All Hamilton municipal elections are officially non-partisan. Note: Candidate campaign colours are based on the prominent colour used in campaign items (signs, literature, etc.) and are used as a visual differentiation between candidates.
Sources: Hamilton, Ontario, City Clerk's Office Archived 2010-08-20 at the Wayback Machine

== Public school board trustee elections ==
The 2014 HWDSB trustee elections were marked by the high number of incumbents who declined to seek reelection. Judith Bishop (Wards 1 & 2), Laura Peddle (Ward 6), Lillian Orban (Ward 7), interim trustee Shirley Glauser (Wards 9 & 10), and Karen Turkstra (Wards 14 & 15) all chose to leave politics while Tim Simmons (Ward 3) registered to run for city council. With six departures, only five trustees from the 2010–2014 term attempted a return to the board.

=== Wards One and Two (West Lower City) ===
Chris Erl, a candidate for the public school board trustee vacancy in August 2013 announced on October 27, 2013, that he would seek election in Wards One and Two. He filed on January 8, 2014. On March 28, Grant Thomas, who had registered on January 9, withdrew from the race. This coincided with the nomination of Christine Bingham, the chair of the parent council at Parkview High School, a local special education school. On July 9, Ed Sculthorpe, a local small business owner and veteran, registered to run in Wards One and Two. Soon after, 26-year incumbent Judith Bishop announced she would not seek re-election. Brian Gage, who previously served as Trustee for Ward One from 1994 to 1997 before the number of trustees per seat was reduced to one, registered on August 28. Simon Granat, a staffer with Hamilton Centre MP David Christopherson, was the last to enter the race on August 29.

Candidates for the October 27, 2014 Hamilton-Wentworth District School Board Wards One and Two trustee election
Candidate	Popular vote			Expenditures
Candidate	Votes	%	±%	Expenditures
Christine Bingham	3,337	30.75%	–	$974.20
Brian Gage	2,503	23.06%	–	$7,190.00
Ed Sculthorpe	1,938	17.86%	–	$5,416.35
Simon Granat	1,739	16.02%	–	$4,930.11
Chris Erl	1,335	12.3%	–	$2,507.21
Total votes	10,852	24.79%		
Registered voters	43,767	100%		
^{1} These candidates did not submit official financial statements and were therefore ineligible to run in the 2018 municipal election. Note: All Hamilton municipal elections are officially non-partisan. Note: Candidate campaign colours are based on the prominent colour used in campaign items (signs, literature, etc.) and are used as a visual differentiation between candidates.
Sources: City of Hamilton, "Nominated Candidates" Archived 2010-08-20 at the Wayback Machine

=== Ward Three (Lower City) ===
The Ward Three trustee race was marked by the decision of the incumbent, Tim Simmons, to seek election to city council. The first candidate to register in the ward was Larry Pattison, a local father. Speaking with The Hamiltonian, Pattison indicated he opposed school closures, wanted to strengthen the relationship between the school board and city council, and saw schools as community hubs.

The second contender in the race was Michael Adkins, a member of the City of Hamilton's Municipal Heritage Committee and retired family counsellor who finished second in the Ward Three trustee race in 2006. In an early interview with The Hamiltonian, Adkins did not provide details about his platform, but was quoted as saying, "I am well aware of the complications and difficulties in pleasing all of the people all of the time but will endeavor to be the voice for as many families as I possibly can."

Candidates for the October 27, 2014 Hamilton-Wentworth District School Board Ward Three trustee election
Candidate	Popular vote			Expenditures
Candidate	Votes	%	±%	Expenditures
Larry Thomas Pattison Jr.	1,587	34.73%	–	$2,933.23
Michael Adkins	1,237	27.07%	–	n/a^{1}
Erick Monterozza	977	21.38%	–	$6,311.09
Steven Paul Denault	453	9.91%	–	$1,050.00
Jeremy Paul Fritchley	315	6.89%	–	n/a^{1}
Total votes	4,569	19.01%		
Registered voters	24,035			
^{1} These candidates did not submit official financial statements and were therefore ineligible to run in the 2018 municipal election. Note: All Hamilton municipal elections are officially non-partisan. Note: Candidate campaign colours are based on the prominent colour used in campaign items (signs, literature, etc.) and are used as a visual differentiation between candidates.
Sources: City of Hamilton, "Nominated Candidates" Archived 2010-08-20 at the Wayback Machine

=== Ward Four (East Lower City) ===
Candidates for the October 27, 2014 Hamilton-Wentworth District School Board Ward Four trustee election
Candidate	Popular vote			Expenditures
Candidate	Votes	%	±%	Expenditures
Ray E. Mulholland (incumbent)	2,410	49.21%	+0.63%	$2,856.00
Cindy Kennedy	954	19.48%	−5.01%	$0
Sandra Lindsay	882	18.01%	–	$0
Linda Chenoweth	651	13.29%	–	$1,345.24
Total votes	4,897	21.02%		
Registered voters	23,287			
^{1} These candidates did not submit official financial statements and were therefore ineligible to run in the 2018 municipal election. Note: All Hamilton municipal elections are officially non-partisan. Note: Candidate campaign colours are based on the prominent colour used in campaign items (signs, literature, etc.) and are used as a visual differentiation between candidates.
Sources: City of Hamilton, "Nominated Candidates" Archived 2010-08-20 at the Wayback Machine

=== Ward Five (East City) ===
Candidates for the October 27, 2014 Hamilton-Wentworth District School Board Ward Five trustee election
Candidate	Popular vote			Expenditures
Candidate	Votes	%	±%	Expenditures
Todd White (incumbent)	3,608	75.64%	+26.28%	$4,978.32
Cahl Brown	1,162	24.36%	-	n/a^{1}
Total votes	4,770	18.39%		
Registered voters	25,929			
^{1} These candidates did not submit official financial statements and were therefore ineligible to run in the 2018 municipal election. Note: All Hamilton municipal elections are officially non-partisan. Note: Candidate campaign colours are based on the prominent colour used in campaign items (signs, literature, etc.) and are used as a visual differentiation between candidates.
Sources: City of Hamilton, "Nominated Candidates" Archived 2010-08-20 at the Wayback Machine

=== Ward Six (East Mountain) ===
In late 2013, incumbent trustee Laura Peddle announced she would not seek re-election. Allan Miles, a youth worker living in Stoney Creek, was the first candidate to register on January 21. Speaking with the Mountain News in February, Miles said he was running to "be transparent with the parents and voters."

In April, Eamon O'Donnell, a licensed air conditioning technician and Highview Elementary School parent, registered to run in the ward. Speaking with the Mountain News after his nomination, O'Donnell questioned the figures board staff had presented when discussing the needed repairs at Sherwood Secondary School, and said that, as a trustee, he "would ask a lot more questions with regard to how the money's being spent."

Candidates for the October 27, 2014 Hamilton-Wentworth District School Board Ward Six trustee election
Candidate	Popular vote			Expenditures
Candidate	Votes	%	±%	Expenditures
Kathy Archer	2,094	33.37%	-3.67%	$1,107.34
Allan Miles	1,632	26.01%	–	$6,125.38
Eamon O'Donnell	1,542	24.57%	–	$2,576.65
Angie Armstrong	636	10.14%	–	$389.13
Tanya Prosser	371	5.91%	–	n/a^{1}
Total votes	6,275	22.32%		
Registered voters	28,114			
^{1} These candidates did not submit official financial statements and were therefore ineligible to run in the 2018 municipal election. Note: All Hamilton municipal elections are officially non-partisan. Note: Candidate campaign colours are based on the prominent colour used in campaign items (signs, literature, etc.) and are used as a visual differentiation between candidates.
Sources: City of Hamilton, "Nominated Candidates" Archived 2010-08-20 at the Wayback Machine

=== Ward Seven (Central Mountain) ===
Marlon Picken, an environmental aide at the Juravinski Hospital and runner up in the 2010 race, filed to run again on January 20. Speaking with The Hamilton Mountain News, Picken noted that he hoped to oppose school closures and work on building a consensus among trustees on the best way to save community schools. The next entrant into the race was Michael Patchett, a 35-year-old carpenter, indicated that he wanted to minimize bussing and keep schools open. Patchett withdrew on September 5. Sarah Warry-Poljanski was the third candidate to register, opposing the school closures in her community, telling the Mountain News, "her involvement in the closure study that could shutter up to three central Mountain elementary schools piqued her interest in taking the political plunge." Sarah also stated that she hopes to utilize her skills and knowledge from working with children and youth to bring something new to the table. Dawn Danko, a medical radiation sciences professor who was involved in the accommodation review at her children's school, registered in the summer of 2014.

Summary of the October 27, 2014 Hamilton, Ontario Ward Seven Public School Board trustee election
Candidate	Popular vote			Expenditures
Candidate	Votes	%	±%	Expenditures
Dawn Danko	5,593	66.42%	–	$9,556.98
Marlon Picken	1,443	17.14%	-22.09%	$9,067.02
Sarah Warry-Poljanski	1,385	16.45%	–	$1,299.46
Total votes	8,421	20.46%		
Registered voters	41,156			
^{1} These candidates did not submit official financial statements and were therefore ineligible to run in the 2018 municipal election. Note: All Hamilton municipal elections are officially non-partisan. Note: Candidate campaign colours are based on the prominent colour used in campaign items (signs, literature, etc.) and are used as a visual differentiation between candidates.
Sources: Hamilton, Ontario City Clerk's Office Archived 2010-08-20 at the Wayback Machine

=== Ward Eight (West Mountain) ===
Sitting trustee Wes Hicks told the Hamilton Community News that he intended to stand for another term in 2014. Hicks filed on January 20, 2014.

Summary of the October 27, 2014 Hamilton, Ontario Ward Eight Public School Board trustee election
Candidate	Popular vote			Expenditures
Candidate	Votes	%	±%	Expenditures
Wes Hicks (incumbent)	5,503	72.83%	+9.45%	$4,860.27
Chris Litfin	2,053	27.17%	-	$495.13
Total votes	7,556	-	-	
Registered voters	-	-	-	
Note: All Hamilton municipal elections are officially non-partisan. Note: Candidate campaign colours are based on the prominent colour used in campaign items (signs, literature, etc.) and are used as a visual differentiation between candidates.
Sources: Hamilton, Ontario, City Clerk's Office Archived 2010-08-20 at the Wayback Machine

=== Wards Nine and Ten (West Stoney Creek) ===
The Wards Nine and Ten trustee election was marked by the appointment of former Wards Eleven and Twelve trustee Shirley Glauser in 2013 after the sudden death of Bob Barlow. Barlow had been the area's trustee from 2000 to 2003 and again from 2006 until his death at the age of 47. After her appointment, Glauser confirmed that she would not seek a full term as the Stoney Creek trustee, opting to retire from the board.

The first candidate to register was Ken Chartrand, who was previously a candidate for Ward Eleven councillor in 2010. After Chartrand filed to run in Wards Nine and Ten in February 2014, he withdrew from the race on April 17.

The second candidate to register was Greg Sinasac, a local contractor. In an early interview, Sinasac indicated his priorities were addressing school closures, respecting families, and providing stronger programming for students.

Summary of the October 27, 2014 Hamilton, Ontario Wards Nine and Ten Public School Board trustee election
Candidate	Popular vote			Expenditures
Candidate	Votes	%	±%	Expenditures
Jeff Beattie	3,260	44.35%	-	$6,310.20
Stefanie Sheils	2,196	29.87%	-	$6,523.72
Greg Sinasac	1,895	25.78%	-	n/a^{1}
Total votes	7,351	-	-	-
Registered voters	-	-	-	-
^{1} These candidates did not submit official financial statements and were therefore ineligible to run in the 2018 municipal election. Note: All Hamilton municipal elections are officially non-partisan. Note: Candidate campaign colours are based on the prominent colour used in campaign items (signs, literature, etc.) and are used as a visual differentiation between candidates.
Sources: Hamilton, Ontario, City Clerk's Office Archived 2010-08-20 at the Wayback Machine

=== Wards Eleven and Twelve (East Stoney Creek, Ancaster, Glanbrook) ===
Candidates for the October 27, 2014 Hamilton-Wentworth District School Board Wards Eleven and Twelve trustee election
Candidate	Popular vote			Expenditures
Candidate	Votes	%	±%	Expenditures
Alex Johnstone (incumbent)	5,190	42.38%	-24.52%	$3,477.63
Serena Samuel	3,986	32.55%	n/a	n/a^{1}
Mike Bell	3,070	25.07%	n/a	$2,901.48
Total votes	12,246			
Registered voters				
^{1} These candidates did not submit official financial statements and were therefore ineligible to run in the 2018 municipal election. Note: All Hamilton municipal elections are officially non-partisan. Note: Candidate campaign colours are based on the prominent colour used in campaign items (signs, literature, etc.) and are used as a visual differentiation between candidates.
Sources: City of Hamilton, "Nominated Candidates" Archived 2010-08-20 at the Wayback Machine

=== Ward Thirteen (Dundas) ===
Ancaster resident and former Family Coalition Party candidate Bob Maton was the first candidate to register in Wards Thirteen and Fourteen on January 24. Speaking to Hamilton Community News in February, Maton listed his priorities as investigating "single-gender classes, offering more specialty programs in the arts and construction, and welcoming 'a lot more corporate sponsorship of programs'." Copetown resident Christopher Yendt was the last person to register, on September 10. Yendt stressed his "youth and vitality, compared to the other candidates" and wanted to focus on changing "the co-op program to allow students to see real, on-the-ground applications of trades earlier in their programs."

Candidates for the October 27, 2014 Hamilton-Wentworth District School Board Ward Thirteen trustee election
Candidate	Popular vote			Expenditures
Candidate	Votes	%	±%	Expenditures
Greg Van Geffen	5,166	54.32%	–	$6,808.67
Bob Maton	2,644	38.31%	–	$5,573.88
Christopher Yendt	701	7.37%	–	n/a^{1}
Total votes	12,377	39.69%	−6.11%	
Registered voters	31,188			
^{1} These candidates did not submit official financial statements and were therefore ineligible to run in the 2018 municipal election. Note: All Hamilton municipal elections are officially non-partisan. Note: Candidate campaign colours are based on the prominent colour used in campaign items (signs, literature, etc.) and are used as a visual differentiation between candidates.
Sources: City of Hamilton, "Nominated Candidates" Archived 2010-08-20 at the Wayback Machine

=== Wards Fourteen and Fifteen (Wentworth - Flamborough) ===
Candidates for the October 27, 2014 Hamilton-Wentworth District School Board Wards Fourteen and Fifteen trustee election
Candidate	Popular vote			Expenditures
Candidate	Votes	%	±%	Expenditures
Penny Deathe	2,137	50.13	-	$3,646.92
Nick Lauwers	2,126	49.87	-	$11,269.49
Total votes	4,263			
Registered voters				
Note: All Hamilton municipal elections are officially non-partisan. Note: Candidate campaign colours are based on the prominent colour used in campaign items (signs, literature, etc.) and are used as a visual differentiation between candidates.
Sources: City of Hamilton, "Nominated Candidates" Archived 2010-08-20 at the Wayback Machine

== Catholic school board trustee elections ==
=== Wards One and Two ===
Candidates for the October 27, 2014 Hamilton-Wentworth Catholic District School Board Wards One and Two trustee election
Candidate	Popular vote			Expenditures
Candidate	Votes	%	±%	Expenditures
Mark Valvasori (incumbent)	1,774	82.86%	+39.47%	$729.39
Al Ptasinkskas	367	17.14%	-	n/a^{1}
Total votes	2,141			
Registered voters				
^{1} These candidates did not submit official financial statements and were therefore ineligible to run in the 2018 municipal election. Note: All Hamilton municipal elections are officially non-partisan. Note: Candidate campaign colours are based on the prominent colour used in campaign items (signs, literature, etc.) and are used as a visual differentiation between candidates.
Sources: City of Hamilton, "Nominated Candidates" Archived 2010-08-20 at the Wayback Machine

=== Wards Three and Four ===
Candidates for the October 27, 2014 Hamilton-Wentworth Catholic District School Board Wards Three and Four trustee election
Candidate	Popular vote			Expenditures
Candidate	Votes	%	±%	Expenditures
Anthony Perri	1,307	41.28%		$8,384.02
Frank Ciotti	616	19.46%		n/a^{1}
Louis Agro	409	12.92%		$267
Brian Nestor	365	11.53%		$0
Anthony Mamone	340	10.74%		n/a^{1}
George Harbottle	129	4.07%		n/a^{1}
Total votes	3,166	100%		
Registered voters				
^{1} These candidates did not submit official financial statements and were therefore ineligible to run in the 2018 municipal election. Note: All Hamilton municipal elections are officially non-partisan. Note: Candidate campaign colours are based on the prominent colour used in campaign items (signs, literature, etc.) and are used as a visual differentiation between candidates.
Sources: City of Hamilton, "Nominated Candidates" Archived 2010-08-20 at the Wayback Machine

=== Ward Five ===
Candidates for the October 27, 2014 Hamilton-Wentworth Catholic District School Board Ward Five trustee election
Candidate	Popular vote			Expenditures
Candidate	Votes	%	±%	Expenditures
Aldo D'Intino	1,544	48.69	n/a	$1,193.55
Sam Agostino (incumbent)	1,235	38.95	-1.99	$100.00
Diane Bubanko	392	12.36	n/a	$425.73
Total votes	3,171			
Registered voters				
Note: All Hamilton municipal elections are officially non-partisan. Note: Candidate campaign colours are based on the prominent colour used in campaign items (signs, literature, etc.) and are used as a visual differentiation between candidates.
Sources: City of Hamilton, "Nominated Candidates" Archived 2010-08-20 at the Wayback Machine

=== Ward Six ===
Candidates for the October 27, 2014 Hamilton-Wentworth Catholic District School Board Ward Six trustee election
Candidate	Popular vote			Expenditures
Candidate	Votes	%	±%	Expenditures
Joseph Baiardo	1,794	63.39	n/a	$6,188.05
Ed Pecyna	1,036	36.61	n/a	$1,189.76
Total votes	2,830			
Registered voters				
Note: All Hamilton municipal elections are officially non-partisan. Note: Candidate campaign colours are based on the prominent colour used in campaign items (signs, literature, etc.) and are used as a visual differentiation between candidates.
Sources: City of Hamilton, "Nominated Candidates" Archived 2010-08-20 at the Wayback Machine

=== Ward Seven ===
Candidates for the October 27, 2014 Hamilton-Wentworth Catholic District School Board Ward Seven trustee election
Candidate	Popular vote		
Candidate	Votes	%	±%
Pat Daly (incumbent)	Acclaimed		
Total votes			
Registered voters			
Note: All Hamilton municipal elections are officially non-partisan. Note: Candidate campaign colours are based on the prominent colour used in campaign items (signs, literature, etc.) and are used as a visual differentiation between candidates.
Sources: City of Hamilton, "Nominated Candidates" Archived 2010-08-20 at the Wayback Machine

=== Ward Eight ===
Candidates for the October 27, 2014 Hamilton-Wentworth Catholic District School Board Ward Eight trustee election
Candidate	Popular vote			Expenditures
Candidate	Votes	%	±%	Expenditures
John Valvasori (incumbent)	2,875	69.58	+24.93	$1,420.89
Sergio Manchia	849	20.55	-14.2	n/a^{1}
Tad Brudzinski	408	9.87	n/a	n/a^{1}
Total votes	4,132			
Registered voters				
^{1} These candidates did not submit official financial statements and were therefore ineligible to run in the 2018 municipal election. Note: All Hamilton municipal elections are officially non-partisan. Note: Candidate campaign colours are based on the prominent colour used in campaign items (signs, literature, etc.) and are used as a visual differentiation between candidates.
Sources: City of Hamilton, "Nominated Candidates" Archived 2010-08-20 at the Wayback Machine

=== Wards Nine, Ten, and Eleven ===
Candidates for the October 27, 2014 Hamilton-Wentworth Catholic District School Board Wards Nine, Ten, and Eleven trustees election
Candidate	Popular vote			Expenditures
Candidate	Votes	%	±%	Expenditures
Paul Di Francesco (incumbent)	5,540	43.97	+17.1	$1,823.18
Mary Nardini (incumbent)	5,451	43.26	+13.18	$1,290.00
Bernard Josipovic	1,610	12.78	n/a	n/a^{1}
Total votes	12,601			
Registered voters				
^{1} These candidates did not submit official financial statements and were therefore ineligible to run in the 2018 municipal election. Note: This ward elected two Catholic trustees and percentages are specific to each candidate, not for the overall total. Note: All Hamilton municipal elections are officially non-partisan. Note: Candidate campaign colours are based on the prominent colour used in campaign items (signs, literature, etc.) and are used as a visual differentiation between candidates.
Sources: City of Hamilton, "Nominated Candidates" Archived 2010-08-20 at the Wayback Machine

=== Wards Twelve, Thirteen, Fourteen, and Fifteen ===
Summary of the October 27, 2014 Hamilton, Ontario Wards Twelve, Thirteen, Fourteen, and Fifteen Catholic School Board trustee election
Candidate	Popular vote		
Candidate	Votes	%	±%
Carolyn Cornale (incumbent)	Acclaimed		
Total votes			
Registered voters			
Note: All Hamilton municipal elections are officially non-partisan. Note: Candidate campaign colours are based on the prominent colour used in campaign items (signs, literature, etc.) and are used as a visual differentiation between candidates.
Sources: Hamilton, Ontario City Clerk's Office Archived 2010-08-20 at the Wayback Machine

== French public school board election ==
Summary of the October 27, 2014 Hamilton, Ontario Conseil scolaire Viamonde French public school trustee election
Candidate	Popular vote		
Candidate	Votes	%	±%
Pierre Girouard	165	63.22	
Malika Attou	96	36.78	
Total votes	261		
Registered voters			
Note: All Hamilton municipal elections are officially non-partisan. Note: Candidate campaign colours are based on the prominent colour used in campaign items (signs, literature, etc.) and are used as a visual differentiation between candidates.
Sources: Hamilton, Ontario City Clerk's Office Archived 2010-08-20 at the Wayback Machine

- Micheline Wylde is the incumbent trustee.

== French Catholic school board election ==
Summary of the October 27, 2014 Hamilton, Ontario French Catholic School trustee election
Candidate	Popular vote		
Candidate	Votes	%	±%
Marcel Levesque (Incumbent)	612	80.2	
Mulomba Samuel Kalonji	151	19.8	
Total votes	763		
Registered voters			
Note: All Hamilton municipal elections are officially non-partisan. Note: Candidate campaign colours are based on the prominent colour used in campaign items (signs, literature, etc.) and are used as a visual differentiation between candidates.
Sources: Hamilton, Ontario City Clerk's Office Archived 2010-08-20 at the Wayback Machine

== Endorsements ==
Endorsements from the Hamilton and District Labour Council
Candidate	Seat contested	Elected	
Candidate	Seat contested	Yes	No
Brian McHattie	Mayor		
Total endorsed mayoral candidates	1	0	1
Sandy Shaw	Councillor, Ward 1		
Jason Farr	Councillor, Ward 2		
Matthew Green	Councillor, Ward 3		
Sam Merulla	Councillor, Ward 4		
Tom Jackson	Councillor, Ward 6		
Scott Duvall	Councillor, Ward 7		
Terry Whitehead	Councillor, Ward 8		
Gerladine McMullen	Councillor, Ward 9		
Robert Pasuta	Councillor, Ward 13		
Total endorsed council candidates	9	7	2
Chris Erl	Public trustee, Wards 1 & 2		
Larry Pattison	Public trustee, Ward 3		
Ray Mulholland	Public trustee, Ward 4		
Todd White	Public trustee, Ward 5		
Marlon Picken	Public trustee, Ward 7		
Wes Hicks	Public trustee, Ward 8		
Greg Sinasac	Public trustee, Wards 9 & 10		
Alex Johnstone	Public trustee, Wards 11 & 12		
Penny Deathe	Public trustee, Wards 15		
Total endorsed public trustee candidates	9	6	3
Total endorsed candidates	19	13	6
Sources: "McHattie gets labour council backing", Hamilton Spectator, Wednesday, August 20, 2014, pp. A19.

== Incumbents not seeking re-election ==
- Bob Bratina announced in March 2014 that he would not seek another term as mayor.
- Ward Three HWDSB trustee Tim Simmons declined to seek re-election, opting to vie for the position of Ward Three councillor.
- Laura Peddle, HWDSB trustee for Ward Six, told the Hamilton Mountain News that she would not seek re-election. Having attended meetings electronically in November and December 2013, Peddle indicated that her decision was due to a "romantic change" in her life.
- Shirley Glauser, who was appointed to represent Wards Nine and Ten on the HWDSB in the summer of 2013, announced she would not contest the seat in 2014.
- Karen Turkstra, HWDSB trustee for Wards Fourteen and Fifteen, announced she would be retiring after two terms on the board, saying she wanted to spend more time with her family and felt it was inappropriate to serve on the board after her children had graduated from HWDSB schools years prior.

== Withdrawn candidates ==
- Brett Tillotson, candidate for Ward Nine councillor, withdrew on March 7. Tillotson made his intention to withdraw known to Hamilton Community News in February.
- Brad Olynchuk, candidate for council in Ward Six, withdrew from the race on March 24.
- Grant Thomas, Wards One and Two Public School Board trustee candidate, withdrew on March 28.
- Ivana Nosic, Ward Two council candidate, withdrew on April 10.

== Mid-term elections ==
=== Catholic trustee, Ward 6 ===
In April 2012, Catholic trustee for Ward 6 (East Mountain), Father Kyran Kennedy, resigned for medical reasons. Sitting members voted to hold a special election, rather than a by-election because of the costs associated with holding a ward-wide poll. Candidates included former trustees Raymond Bartolotti and John Rocchi, 2010 Ward Five trustee candidate Frank Ciotti, and Ward 6 council candidate Ed Pecyna.

The appointment was not without controversy, as Michael Ecker, the second-place candidate against Kennedy in 2010, was denied an opportunity to apply for the position after failing to supply financial statements from the October election. Under the Municipal Elections Act, Ecker became ineligible for election until 2018. Ecker challenged the penalty, but the case was dismissed by the Ontario Superior Court of Justice.

Catholic school board trustee, Ward 6
Candidate	Elected
Joseph Baiardo	
Raymond Bartolotti	Yes
John Bosanac	
Michael Bozzo	
Frank Ciotti	
Carolann Fernandes	
Gary Gallant	
Andrea Iacurti	
Danyl Lohin	
David Martin	
Peter J. Morrison	
Ed Pecyna	
Michele Piccini	
John Rocchi	
Roy Rodrigues	
John Sullivan	
Source: Catherine O'Hara, "Bartolotti named new Catholic trustee for Ward 6", hamiltonnews.com, April 11, 2012

=== Public trustee, Wards 9 and 10 ===
On May 29, 2013, Public School Board Trustee Robert Barlow died from a heart attack while coaching a baseball game. Members of the Public School Board decided to hold a special election to fill the role of trustee for Wards Nine and Ten (Stoney Creek). The board made the decision to hold a special meeting at the end of August to decide Barlow's replacement. Candidates included former Wards 11 and 12 trustee Shirley Glauser, former Wards One and Two candidate Edward Cole, 2007 provincial Liberal candidate for Hamilton East-Stoney Creek Nerene Virgin, post-secondary students Chris Erl and Christopher Litfin from McMaster and Awish Aslam from Western University, and local artist Carly McAskill.

After candidates gave 10-minute speeches to the Board, sitting trustees selected a candidate, electing former trustee Shirley Glauser on the third ballot.

Public school board trustee, Wards Nine and Ten
Candidate	Elected
Paul Armstrong	
Awish Aslam	
Ralph Balgent	
Stewart Beattie	
Caroline Braganza-Reyes	
Sally Braun-Jackson	
Deban Brunette	
Edward Cole	
Chris Erl	
Shirley Glauser	Yes
Carolyn Harris	
James Jackson	
Jacqueline Kovacich	
Christopher Litfin	
Carly McAskill	
Meghan McIntosh	
Tyler McNeil	
T. J. Perl	
Jeff Reynolds	
Nerene Virgin	
Philip Watkins	
Source: Hamilton-Wentworth District School Board, "Agenda for Trustee Appointment for Wards 9&10 Interviews", Friday, August 23, 2013 (Accessed Friday, August 23, 2013)

== Timeline ==
2010

- October 25, 2010: 2010 Hamilton municipal election
- October 26, 2010: In a story about his acclaimation to council, Ward 14 Councillor Robert Pasuta muses about standing for mayor in 2014.
- November 4, 2010: Bratina chooses Peggy Chapman as his chief of staff. Before beginning work with the mayor's office, Chapman was a journalist with the Bay Observer and Councillor Brad Clark's press secretary when he was provincial minister of labour.
- December 29, 2010: Bratina's mayoral win is named the Spectator's story of the year by the paper's editorial board.

2011

- January 12, 2011: The stadium debate, cited as one of the reasons for Fred Eisenberger's defeat, is settled, with council deciding to back a plan that would have Ivor Wynne Stadium renovated and the Hamilton Tiger Cats play at the existing stadium site for 20 years.
- February 3, 2011: Mayor Bratina's $10,000 donation to the city's United Way campaign comes under scrutiny for possibly violating municipal rules concerning individual donations to charities.
- February 7, 2011: Former Mayor Fred Eisenberger takes over as president of the Canadian Urban Institute.
- February 15, 2011: Bratina delivers his first State of the City address.
- February 17, 2011: Larry Di Ianni hosts a fundraiser to retire his campaign debt, where he announces his 2010 campaign will be his last.
- April 20, 2011: Council approves the lowest property tax increase since amalgamation, at 0.8%.
- June 27, 2011: Council dissolves the Hamilton Entertainment and Convention Facilities Inc., or HECFI, Board of Directors, and assumes control of the organization, putting the mayor and councillors in charge following reports that the previous board was dysfunctional and the agency needed nearly $12 million to continue operating for the previous fiscal year.
- July 18, 2011: Nicholas Kevlahan, a member of the city's Rapid Transit Advisory Committee, resigns after comments made by City Manager Chris Murray and Mayor Bob Bratina signal that the city will no longer be pursuing light rail transit.
- August 5, 2011: After a Twitter dispute between Canadian novelist Margaret Atwood and Toronto City Councillor Doug Ford, Atwood accepts an offer from Bratina and the Spectator to visit the city, praising the development of the arts community in Hamilton's downtown.
- September 14, 2011: Bratina endorses the Liberal Party in the 2011 provincial election.
- October 11, 2011: Council supports a motion by Councilor Terry Whitehead that strips Bratina of the authority to lobby senior levels of government without having other members of council present after endorsing the provincial Liberals.
- November 19, 2011: Former Mayor Fred Eisenberger publishes an opinion piece in the Hamilton Spectator responding to Bratina's critiques of his leadership a year following his victory.
- December 7, 2011: It is revealed that Bratina's chief of staff, Peggy Chapman, received a $30,000 raise. Mayor Bratina tells the Spectator that city hall's human resources department gave her the raise, making a point of noting "I didn't give a raise, she didn't ask for a raise."
- December 8, 2011: The city's human resources manager Helen Hale Tomasik circulates an email to councillors saying Bratina triggered his chief of staff's raise, while the mayor denies involvement in the issue.
- December 9, 2011: Bratina takes full responsibility for authorizing Chapman's raise. The issue, known colloquially as "Peggygate" in local media, sparks council to hold in-camera meetings to discuss the issue.
- December 30, 2011: Bratina announces he is canceling the Office of the Mayor's traditional New Year's Levee.

2012

- January 12, 2012: In an interview with Cable 14 reporter Laura Babcock, former Mayor Eisenberger indicates that he misses local politics, but does not make any definitive statements as to his intentions for 2014, saying, "We'll see what the next two, three years look like."
- March 28, 2012: Bratina becomes the first mayor in Hamilton history to be censured by his peers in a 15–1 vote of council.
- April 10, 2012: Following the resignation of Father Kyran Kennedy, Ward Six Catholic trustee, the Hamilton Wentworth District Catholic School Board appoints Raymond Bartolotti, former trustee for Wards 9, 10, 11, to the position. Bartolotti was selected by sitting members of the board.
- May 18, 2012: Mayor Bratina, in an interview with CBC Hamilton, declines to confirm if he will seek a second term, but tells reporters he will not "just quietly walk into the sunset" after Peggygate.
- June 4, 2012: The Hamilton Spectator's columnist Andrew Dreschel speculates on candidates who may challenge Bratina in 2014, including councillors Terry Whitehead, Chad Collins and Lloyd Ferguson, as well as former Liberal MPPs Marie Bountrogianni and Sophia Aggelonitis, while again raising Trivaris CEO Mark Chamberlain's name as a contender.
- June 8, 2012: Bratina is reprimanded a second time over the raise given to his chief of staff, this time by the city's integrity commissioner, Earl Basse.
- June 11, 2012: Agriculture Minister and Ancaster—Dundas—Flamborough—Westdale MPP Ted McMeekin speculates about challenging Bratina in 2014.
- October 10, 2012: Justin Trudeau, candidate for the Liberal Party leadership, stops in Hamilton. During the visit, Councillor Chad Collins raises speculation that he may stand for the Liberals in the 2015 federal election, while maintaining rumours of his interest in contesting the mayoralty in 2014.

2013

- January 25, 2013: McMeekin, in an interview explaining his support for Kathleen Wynne in the Liberal Party of Ontario leadership election, indicates that he anticipates running in the next provincial election, while not discussing any mayoral ambitions.
- February 23, 2013: Mark Coakley, a local parent, candidate for Ward 13 School Board trustee in 2003, and Green Party of Ontario candidate in the 2000 by-election in Ancaster—Dundas—Flamborough—Aldershot, files an application with the Superior Court of Justice to remove Wards 1 & 2 Public School Trustee Judy Bishop from office over allegations that Bishop voted to close Prince Philip Elementary in the Ainsley Wood neighbourhood in favour of improving schools in Westdale where she owns property, thus boosting its value. The maximum penalty for doing so is removal from the position and a seven-year ban from holding public office. Days before the announcement, Coakley published a letter to the editor demanding that Bishop "get off the gravy train."
- May 29, 2013: Robert Barlow, public school board trustee for Wards 9 & 10, dies suddenly of a heart attack while coaching a baseball game.
- August 12, 2013: The conflict of interest case against Bishop is settled, allowing the trustee to retain her seat on the Board of Education.

2014

- January 2, 2014: Municipal nominations open.
- May 2, 2014: Following NDP leader Andrea Horwath's announcement that her caucus cannot support the budget of Kathleen Wynne's minority Liberal government, the Premier asks Lieutenant Governor David Onley to dissolve the provincial legislature and call an election for June 12, all of which falls within the campaign period for the October 27 municipal race.

== See also ==
- List of Hamilton, Ontario, municipal elections
