= Nora Frances Henderson Secondary School =

Nora Frances Henderson

Location
- 1770 Upper Sherman Avenue; Hamilton, Ontario, L8W 0C5; Canada; 43.191°N 79.867°W

Information
- School type: Public, high school
- Motto: Veritas Omnia Vincit (Truth conquers all)
- Founded: November 11, 1961 (as Barton Secondary School); September 2014 (as Nora Frances Henderson Secondary School)
- School board: Hamilton-Wentworth District School Board
- Superintendent: Laura Romano
- Area trustee: Dawn Danko
- School number: 893455
- Principal: Tom Fisher
- Grades: 9–12
- Enrolment: ≈1500 (September 2023)
- Language: English
- Colours: Blue, Silver and White
- Nickname: Huskies
- Website: www.hwdsb.on.ca/henderson/

Nora Frances Henderson Secondary School (NFHSS) is located at 1770 Upper Sherman Avenue in Hamilton, Ontario, Canada and is a part of the Hamilton-Wentworth District School Board. Originally opened in 1961 as Barton Secondary School, and originally located on 75 Palmer Rd., it had a September 2008 enrolment of 955. Barton Secondary School’s mission statement was "Educating students to become lifelong learners and contributing citizens in a challenging, changing, multi-cultural world." Students were required by Provincial Law to complete 30 mandatory credits and the Ontario Secondary School Literacy Test (OSSLT) within their secondary school career. Nora Frances Henderson Secondary School also offers special education classes as well as an ESL program. The HWDSB announced on May 24, 2012, that Barton Secondary School would be closed, along with Hill Park Secondary School and Mountain Secondary School with the students to be consolidated into a new, $25 million school.

The school was renamed Nora Frances Henderson Secondary School in September 2014, in honour of Nora-Frances Henderson, the first woman to be elected to political office in Hamilton. The original building remained in service until the new Nora Frances Henderson Secondary School was opened on October 14, 2020.

In July 2018, the Hamilton-Wentworth District School Board got approval on building the new Nora Frances Henderson Secondary School. The school was designed by CS&P Architects and was built by Tambro Construction. The original building was then used as Sherwood Secondary School, from September 2022, to June 2024, when the school was temporarily moved from its location on 25 High St to conduct renovations due to asbestos concerns.

In August 2023, the principal of the school, according to media reports, informed parents of special entry and exit plans for students and that parents will be required to email/call before coming to the school if they wish to visit to speak to an employee.

== History ==
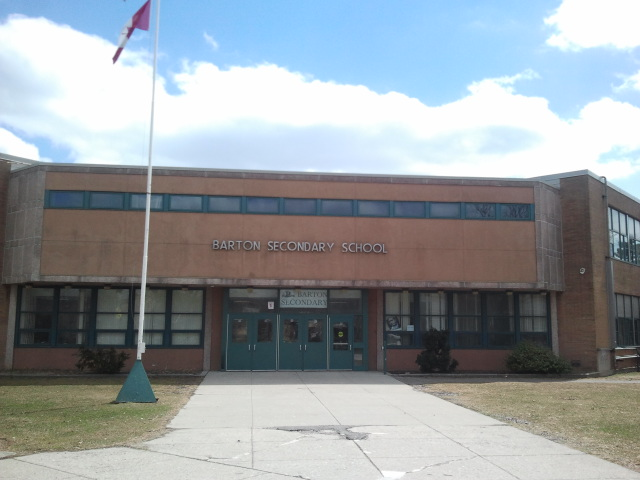
Barton Secondary School in April 2013.

BSS was founded on November 11, 1961, as part of the Board of Education for the City of Hamilton's plan to have enough schools available for children of baby boomers. In 1972, the school became Hamilton's pilot school in initiating a semester system that had been showing positive increases in student achievement amongst schools in Alberta and British Columbia. Over a four-year period, results were studied and in 1976, the semester system was deemed a success and adopted by other schools in Hamilton and the surrounding area.

The school had evolved into a modern composite high school that offers a variety of academics, athletics and co-curricular activities. The school had five computer labs, a renovated gymnasium and library, a full menu cafeteria, state-of-the-art communication labs and technological shops. A Specialist High Skills Major in Manufacturing was offered at Barton. B.S.S. had over 150 courses, though not all were offered at any given time.

== Controversy ==
In August 2023 parents received a memo stating that a controversial teacher, Kayla Lemieux, would be joining the staff. Lemieux, who identifies as a transgender woman, had attracted attention for wearing extremely large prosthetic breasts that she claimed were real to her job as a shop teacher at Oakville Trafalgar High School. Oakville Trafalgar High School was subject to protests, petitions, public outbursts and a string of death and bomb threats due to the controversy. In March 2023, a school spokesperson stated that Lemieux was "not currently on active assignment" but remained employed by the board. Months later she was employed by Nora Frances Henderson.

The memo informing parents of that fact said "should the school be subject to any disruptions or protests; we are committed to communicating with you as openly and as frequently as possible to ensure student safety – and to share any operational plans."

There were no disruptions from the beginning of the school year to mid September, until on September 21, 2023 the school was evacuated to the football field. Students were not informed of the reason, and a routine fire drill earlier that day caused confusion until news that it was a bomb threat was posted on the Hamilton police X (Twitter) account. The threat had been emailed to the school board, the police, and multiple news outlets and warned of "several bombs" at Nora Frances Henderson Secondary School. It stated: "We will end your lives if you do not evacuate the school. Next time there may not be a warning." Students and staff were evacuated to the nearby Ray Lewis Elementary School after multiple hours in the football field. By the mid afternoon the school was deemed safe and the remaining students there could return.

The following day on Friday, September 22, 2023 the school received another bomb threat early in the morning and evacuated around 9:10am, and the school was declared safe around 10:30 after no bomb was found, but most students left the school before then.

The second email threat accused the school of "degenerate and sexually deviant behaviour from its staff members."

On the following Monday, September 25 Henderson received yet another bomb threat and was evacuated. But unlike the previous incidents, three other schools also received bomb threats, Saltfleet Secondary School, Highview Elementary School and Mount Albion Elementary School. No bombs were found at any of the schools.

== School specialization ==
BSS took part in the Hamilton-Wentworth District School Board's Programs of Choice method that tailors learning to specific areas of interest. Barton Secondary School's focus was on the manufacturing industry and offers programs accordingly. Grade 9 and 10 students in the program were offered introductory courses in the manufacturing field, while grade 11 and 12 students had the option to specialize in the program. Barton Secondary School also provided a Cisco networking course through the Cisco Networking Academy.

== Notable alumni ==
- Bryan Crawford (born 1982), former Canadian football running back & special teams captain for the Toronto Argonauts.

== See also ==
- Education in Ontario
- List of secondary schools in Ontario
