= Mountain Secondary School (Hamilton) =

Coordinates: 43.22659°N 79.88499°W

Mountain Secondary School was a school located at 60 Caledon Avenue Hamilton Ontario. It was part of the Hamilton-Wentworth District School Board.

The school was founded in 1995 when the Caledon and Crestwood Vocational Schools merged, and had a 2009-2010 student enrolment of 328. Mountain Secondary School used the Ontario Secondary School Literacy Test (OSSLT) to assess Grade 10 students' skills in reading and writing. Successful completion of the test is one of 32 requirements students needed to attain in order to receive an Ontario Secondary School Diploma. The school also offered special education classes and an ESL program.

The HWDSB announced on 24 May 2012 that Mountain Secondary School would close, along with Hill Park Secondary School and Barton Secondary School. The students were moved to a new, $25 million school, and on June 26, 2017, the school closed down.

Officials and Administrators	Name
School Principal	Wanda Bielak
Vice Principal	Brent Monkley
Superintendent	John Laverty
Director of Education	John Malloy
Trustee	Wes Hicks

== Program highlights ==
Mountain Secondary School took part in the following programs:

- Multi-credit packages which include contextualized lessons in academic classes, industry standard certifications, pathway- based field trips, guest speakers, job shadowing and Co-operative Education in the following sectors:
  - Transportation
  - Cosmetology
  - Hospitality
  - Building Maintenance
  - Cabinetmaking
  - Retail
  - Personal/Senior/Child Care
- Scaffold Approach to Cooperative Education
  - On-site Cooperative Education through: H.W.D.S.B. self-catered meeting rooms, Mountain Thrift and Gift Store, Cabinetmaking- Award winning - Manufacturing - Profiling
  - Student Success Center- Integrated approach to Learning
  - Resource, Guidance, and Student Success
  - “Opening Doors”- in conjunction with Public Health Nurse, to support grade nine students
  - Transition Program to support incoming grade 9 students
- Alternative Education Programs
  - “Return and Learn” – to support students with chronic attendance problems
  - “Fast Track”- to support senior students (18+) with low credit accumulation
  - Girls “GET” It! (Goals, Esteem, Triumph) – to promote and support girls’ self-image, self-esteem, and self-worth

== See also ==
- List of high schools in Ontario
