= Murder of Devan Bracci-Selvey =

2019 child murder in Hamilton, Ontario, Canada

- 43.256222°N 79.870833°E
- Location: Sir Winston Churchill Secondary School, Hamilton, Ontario, Canada
- Date: October 7, 2019
- Target: Devan Bracci-Selvey
- Attack type: Stabbing
- Weapon: Knife
- Deaths: 1
- Injuries: 0
- Victim: Devan Bracci-Selvey (age 14)
- Accused: Two brothers (ages 14 and 18)
- Charges: First-degree murder
- Verdict: Guilty
- Convictions: First-degree murder
- Convicted: One brother (age 18)

Devan Bracci-Selvey was a 14-year-old ninth-grade student at Sir Winston Churchill Secondary School who was stabbed to death outside the school by a fellow student in Hamilton, Ontario, Canada, on 7 October 2019.

== Incident ==
Bracci-Selvey spotted his missing bike across the street from the school, and his friend then called his father to ask if he could help retrieve his friend's bike from a group of bullies who had stolen it a few weeks prior. The father of the said friend arrived at the nearby Pat Quinn Parkdale Arena and confronted the thieves to assist in getting Bracci-Selvey's bike back. While trying to reason with the father, the 18-year-old older brother of the central perpetrator responded by spraying the man with what is believed to have been bear mace. Bracci-Selvey's mother then arrived, after which he attempted to run and call for her. He made it from the arena across from the front of the school, where the bear mace attack happened, and later to the back of the school where Bracci-Selvey's mother waited in the parking lot.

As Bracci-Selvey was getting closer to his mother, a group of students came running from the back of the school in pursuit of him. A 16-year-old girl taunted Bracci-Selvey, demanding he hit her, to which he replied, "I can’t hit you, I wasn’t raised that way." Bracci-Selvey attempted to rush over to enter his mother's vehicle but was stabbed nineteen times from behind by a single perpetrator.

== The victim ==
Devan Bracci-Selvey was 14 years old at the time of his death, and went to Sir Winston Churchill Secondary School, where he was in the ninth-grade.

Devan's sister wrote on a GoFundMe fundraiser for his funeral that her brother was a "shy, quiet, [helpful] kid who had tried get help with the bullying he was experiencing." Devan was fond of cars, video games, and animals, had dreams of becoming a mechanic, and was excited to become an uncle for the second time. Devan, according to his mother, "protected everybody" and never hesitated to stick up for friends when they were being harassed. Citing the age of the victim and suspects as well as an ongoing investigation, police would not comment on nor confirm speculation and reports surrounding possible motives and the nature of the confirmed "existing relationship" between the victim and the accused. Relatives, including the boy's mother, who spoke to Global News and CP24, confirmed Devan was relentlessly bullied since beginning high school a month earlier, and their concerns were dismissed by school officials who deemed there was "insufficient evidence to take action." Devan had begun skipping classes, attending school part-time before calling home asking to be picked up, or refusing to go to school in the mornings as a result of the bullying.

== Arrests and sentencing ==
Two brothers, a 14-year-old and an 18-year-old, were arrested after the incident and later charged with first-degree murder following a preliminary investigation by Hamilton Police Service. A third individual was arrested but "was interviewed and later released unconditionally once [their] involvement in the investigation was established." On October 8, 2019, police had announced a 16-year-old male and a 16-year-old female, outstanding suspects, were also arrested and taken into custody on suspicion of first-degree murder. On October 9, 2019, both were released without charge after being questioned lengthily about the homicide. Detective-Sergeant Steve Bereziuk noted in a media release that "based on evidence there is some element of pre-planning […] and premeditation [involved with] this homicide."

In August 2020, the 18-year-old suspect received a suspended sentence with 15 months on probation. The family of the victim was not satisfied with the sentence.

With regards to Selvey and the youth charged with his murder, it was confirmed during the trial that “before the stabbing, the two teens were "strangers" who did not know each other, according to the agreed-upon facts.” This would affirm that his death was a product of the tragic circumstances of that day, but did not actually relate to any previous alleged instances of bullying.

== Response ==
A crisis response intervention team, social workers, police liaison officers, wellness counsellors, and extra staff support for teachers and administrators were sent to the school following the incident. As public frustration and anger grew against the perceived inaction of the Hamilton-Wentworth District School Board (HWDSB) leading up to the incident, Director of Education Manny Figueiredo advised CBC News that "an investigation into what happened [would] get underway once the police investigation wraps [up]." After the stabbing, Figueiredo felt the school was still "the safest place for a kid to be right now [as] a lot of [students] want to be together, they want to be with their friends and talk and make sense and deal with their grief" even as many parents kept their children home from school in the days after the stabbing. When pressed specifically on the bullying Bracci-Selvey endured and what the school did in response, Figueiredo said he was not aware of what led up to the violence and instead advocated for a community-oriented response: "The schools don't live in isolation of the community... they need to take a leadership role [when it comes to bullying] because we have these students for five hours a day. We have to continue to engage our kids...if a kid turns to us, how are we responding so they see that it's safe to respond?" Figueiredo encouraged students who do not feel safe, or have not felt safe in the past, to raise their concerns with adults.
