= Hill Park Secondary School =

Location
- 465 East 16th Hamilton, Ontario, L9A 4K6; Canada

Information
- School type: High school
- Motto: Know The Reasons
- Founded: 1955
- Closed: 2014
- Superintendent: Sharon Stephanian
- Area trustee: Lillian Orban
- School number: 916722
- Principal: Angela Ferguson
- Grades: 9-12
- Hours in school day: Start: 8:40 AM - End: 3:00 PM
- Mascot: Black Ram
- Website: www.hwdsb.on.ca/hillpark/

Hill Park Secondary School was the oldest high school on the Hamilton Mountain and was a member of the Hamilton-Wentworth District School Board. The school, located at 465 East 16th Street in Hamilton, was founded in 1955 as a fully composite high school, and was the first secondary school built on the Hamilton Mountain. The school was built as part of Hamilton's need for more secondary schools to match the increasing enrollment of baby boomers. The HWDSB announced on 24 May 2012 that Hill Park Secondary School will close, along with Barton Secondary School and Mountain Secondary School. The students will be consolidated into a new, $25 million school, to be named Nora Frances Henderson Secondary School. The school closed in June 2014 and the students from the school moved over to the former Barton Secondary School, renamed to Nora Frances Henderson Secondary School as a backup until the replacement opened on October 14, 2020.

== Program Highlights ==
- Boys Athletic Council – Hamilton Bulldogs game event, holiday dinner, Toronto Raptors game event
- Drama – Program of Choice in the Performing Arts, and Specialist High Skills Major in Arts and Culture, which allowed students to complete their diploma with a focus in the arts. Art Smart was an innovative program that allows students from across Hamilton, Ontario to participate in a musical theatre production, co-produced by partners at Theatre Ancaster. Trips to Stratford, Toronto, and Theatre Aquarius. For the first time, the club would compete in the 64th season of Ontario Sears Drama Festival
- Geography – Trips to Niagara Falls, Toronto, Royal Botanical Gardens, waterfront
- Hamilton Music Awards
- History and English – Trips to New York City
- Media Arts – Film festival
- Phys-Ed – Camping and ski trips

== Student Support Programs ==
- After School Literacy Program
- Bursary Program
- Complete-A-Credit
- Credit Recovery
- Grade 6-8 Transitions Program
- Jr. and Sr. Alter Ed.
- Ontario Secondary School Literacy Course (OSSLC)
- SMART Club
- STEP program (remedial summer)
- Walk-In Closet Program

=== Drive to 85 ===
Drive to 85 was a program that gave students more ways to accumulate credits to graduate while improving the quality of high school education in the province. The program's aim was for 85% of Ontario students to graduate from secondary school by the 2010–2011 school year.

== Notable alumni ==
- Jason Jones (born 1973), actor and comedian (The Detour, The Daily Show with Jon Stewart)

== See also ==
- List of high schools in Ontario
