= Brad Crawford (Canadian football) =

Canadian football player (born 1987)

No. 45
- Position: Defensive back

Personal information
- Born: February 4, 1987 (age 39); Hamilton, Ontario, Canada
- Listed height: 6 ft 0 in (1.83 m)
- Listed weight: 210 lb (95 kg)

Career information
- University: Guelph
- CFL draft: 2009: 6th round, 43rd overall pick

Career history
- 2009: Toronto Argonauts
- Stats at CFL.ca

Brad Crawford (born February 4, 1987) is a Canadian former professional football defensive back. He was drafted by the Toronto Argonauts in the sixth round of the 2009 CFL draft. He played CIS football for the Guelph Gryphons.

He is the younger brother of fellow Argonaut Bryan Crawford.

In 2009 Crawford was invited to the Argonauts pre-season training camp, but was later put on the suspended list on June 7. He was invited to the Argonauts pre-season training camp again in 2010, but was released on June 20.
