= Bryan Crawford =

Canadian sports executive and player (born 1982)

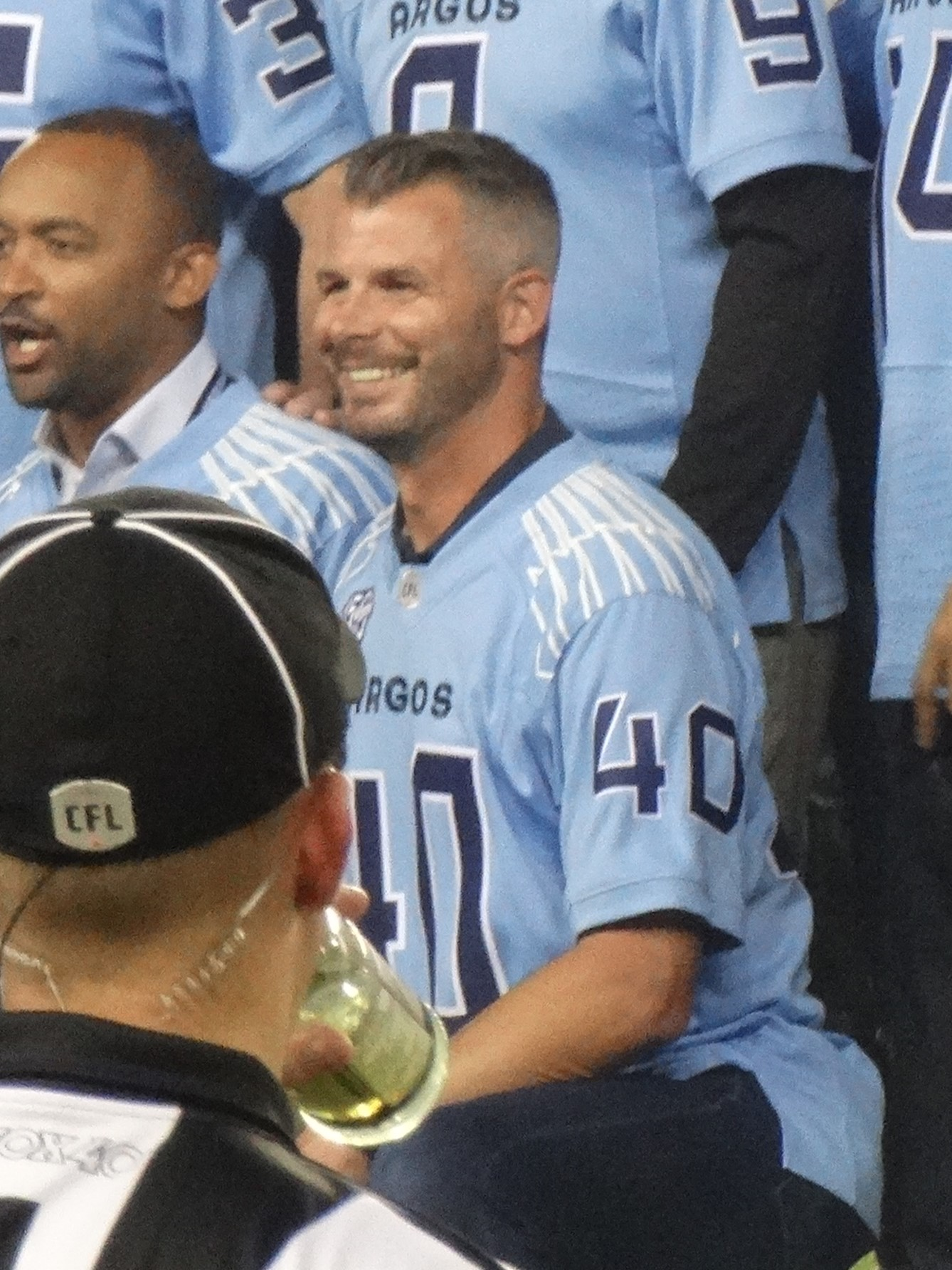
- Crawford in 2023

No. 40
- Position: Running back

Personal information
- Born: February 18, 1982 (age 44); Hamilton, Ontario, Canada
- Listed height: 5 ft 10 in (1.78 m)
- Listed weight: 200 lb (91 kg)

Career information
- High school: Barton
- University: Queen's
- CFL draft: 2005: 5th round, 44th overall pick

Career history
- 2005–2011: Toronto Argonauts

Awards and highlights
- Queen's Rookie of the Year (2001); Queen's Special teams Player of the Year (2002); MVP at CIS East West All-Star game (2004)
- Stats at CFL.ca (archive)

Bryan Crawford (born February 18, 1982) is a Canadian sports executive & former Canadian football running back who played his entire pro career, 112 games with the Toronto Argonauts. On August 6, 2024, Crawford became the commissioner of the Ontario Hockey League, replacing David Branch.

== Early life ==
Bryan is the son of Glenn and Elaine Crawford. His younger brother Brad is his teammate on the Argonauts. while his sister Lauren is a freshman defender on the University of Buffalo women's soccer team. Bryan attended Barton Secondary School where he was named the team MVP, Athlete of the Year, and game MVP of the Hamilton Steel City Bowl.

He played four seasons with the Golden Gaels of Queen's University while pursuing a political science degree and won two bronze medals in the 2004-05 OUA track championship. In football, he was named Queen's Rookie of the Year in 2001, Queen's Special teams Player of the Year in 2002, and the MVP at the 2004 CIS East West All-Star game.

== Professional football career ==
Crawford ran a 4.50 second 40-yard dash in the 2005 CFL Evaluation Camp and was drafted in the fifth round, 44th overall, in the 2005 CFL draft by the Argonauts. He made his regular season debut in week 11 of the 2005 CFL season and continued to play as back-up running back and special teams player for the remainder of the season, including key special teams plays in Weeks 14 and 16 that saw him named ESQ player of the game for week 14.

In the 2007 CFL season, Crawford was one of just four players on the Argos' offence to play every game and led the Argos with a career-high 27 special teams tackles. He was recognized by his teammates as a special teams co-captain for his hard work and intelligent play. The Argonauts extended his contract through the 2010 CFL season on January 8, 2008. on November 4, 2011, Bryan announced his retirement from pro football. He finished his career as the Argos all-time leader in special teams tackles with 137 to go along with 26 carries for 217 yards and two touchdowns on the ground and 17 receptions for 140 yards, averaging 8.2 yards per catch in 112 games played.

== Sports executive career ==
From November 2015 to July 2018, Crawford served as the Senior Director of Operations for Basketball Canada.

From July 2018 to June 2024, Crawford was the Tournament Director of the RBC Canadian Open.

In August 2024, Crawford replaced David Branch as Commissioner of the Ontario Hockey League.
