= Sir Winston Churchill Secondary School (Hamilton, Ontario) =

Location
- 1715 Main Street East; Hamilton, Ontario, L8H 1E3; Canada; 43°14′15″N 79°47′45″W

Information
- School type: Secondary school
- Established: 1967
- School board: Hamilton-Wentworth District School Board
- Superintendent: Laura Romano
- Area trustee: Ray Mulholland
- Principal: David Schroeder
- Vice-principal(s): Peter Sheahan; Venetia Fletcher
- Grades: 9–12
- Enrolment: Approx. 1100 students (as of 2010)
- Language: English
- Campus type: Suburban
- Colours: Scarlet and silver
- Song: "Churchill School Song"
- Mascot: Bulldog
- Website: www.hwdsb.on.ca/sirwinstonchurchill/

Sir Winston Churchill Secondary School is a Canadian secondary school located in Hamilton, Ontario. It is a member of the Hamilton-Wentworth District School Board. The school's mission statement is "Educating students to become lifelong learners and contributing citizens in a challenging, changing, multi-cultural world." Apart from the standard course offerings, the school provides special education classes and an ESL program.

== History ==
Sir Winston Churchill Secondary School was founded in 1967 as part of a plan by the Board of Education for the City of Hamilton to have enough schools available to meet the demand of the baby boomers. In 1972, the school became Hamilton's pilot school in the semester system style of schedule that had been showing positive increases in student achievement amongst schools in Alberta and British Columbia. The school was named after Sir Winston Churchill, the prime minister of the United Kingdom during World War II.

The school gained notoriety in the fall of 1987, as it became one of a handful of schools suggested for transfer to the Hamilton Wentworth District Separate School Board. Under a controversial law, which extended public funding to the Catholic school system in Ontario, arbitration suggested that the Winona Secondary School and Churchill be transferred to the Catholic school board, as a measure to address overcrowding among their secondary schools. The protests led to a demonstration at Queen's Park, where groups of secondary school students from the Hamilton and surrounding area, all converged in front of the Ontario Legislature building. Despite the protests, the province accepted the findings of the arbitration. Over the summer of 1988, negotiations between the School Board for the City of Hamilton and the Hamilton Wentworth District Separate School Board resulted in the transfer of Elizabeth Bagshaw School to become the new home of Bishop Ryan Catholic Secondary School, until the 2014 opening of their new building on Rymal Road at Upper Mount Albion Road.

== Incidents ==
=== 2019 stabbing death of Grade 9 student ===
On October 7, 2019, 14-year-old Grade 9 student Devan Bracci-Selvey was stabbed to death in front of his mother outside Sir Winston Churchill Secondary School by four fellow students. Bracci-Selvey's mother had driven to the school to pick up her son around 1:30PM after he called to say that other students at the school had been bothering him. She arrived and saw a group of students taunting Bracci-Selvey and spraying him with an unknown substance, thought to be bear mace. The group hunted the boy down a sidewalk as he fled with his mother following in her vehicle. A 16 year-old girl repeatedly taunted Bracci-Selvey demanding him to hit her, to of which he replied, "I can’t hit you, I wasn’t raised that way." These were the last words his mother would hear from her son alive. Bracci-Selvey then attempted to rush over to enter his mother's vehicle but was swarmed and stabbed. A group of student bystanders witnessed the entire incident, recording the murder live on their cell phones, which police later sought to have turned over as evidence and not shared on social media.

The slain student's sister wrote on a GoFundMe fundraiser for Devan's funeral that her brother was a "shy, quiet, [helpful] kid who had tried get help with the bullying he was experiencing." Bracci-Selvey was fond of cars, video games, and animals, had dreams of becoming a mechanic, and was excited to become an uncle for the second time. Bracci-Selvey, as per his mother, “protected everybody” and never hesitated to stick up for friends when they were being harassed. Citing the age of the victim and suspects as well as an ongoing investigation, police would not comment on nor confirm speculation and reports surrounding possible motives and the nature of the confirmed "existing relationship" between the victim and the accused. Relatives, including the boy's mother, who spoke to Global News and CP24, confirmed that Bracci-Selvey was relentlessly bullied since the beginning of high school a month earlier and that their concerns were dismissed by school officials who deemed there was "insufficient evidence to take action." Bracci-Selvey had begun skipping classes, attending school part-time before calling and asking to be picked up, or refusing to go to school in the mornings as a result of the bullying.

Two brothers, a 14-year-old and an 18-year-old, were arrested after the incident and later charged with first-degree murder following a preliminary investigation by Hamilton Police Service. A third individual was arrested but “was interviewed and later released unconditionally once [their] involvement in the investigation was established.” On October 8, 2019, police had announced a 16-year-old male and a 16-year-old female, outstanding suspects, were also arrested and taken into custody on suspicion of first-degree murder. On October 9, 2019, both were released without charge after being questioned lengthily about the homicide. Detective-Sergeant Steve Bereziuk noted in a media release that "based on evidence there is some element of pre-planning […] and premeditation [involved with] this homicide." In August 2020, the 18-year-old suspect received a suspended sentence with 15 months on probation. The family of the victim was not satisfied with the sentence.

A crisis response intervention team, social workers, police liaison officers, wellness counsellors, and extra staff support for teachers and administrators were sent to the school following the incident. As public frustration and anger grew against the perceived inaction of the Hamilton-Wentworth District School Board (HWDSB) leading up to the incident, Director of Education Manny Figueiredo advised CBC News that "an investigation into what happened [would] get underway once the police investigation wraps [up]." After the stabbing, Figueiredo felt that the school was still "the safest place for a kid to be right now [as] a lot of [students] want to be together, they want to be with their friends and talk and make sense and deal with their grief" even as many parents kept their children home from school in the days after the stabbing. When pressed specifically on the bullying Bracci-Selvey endured and what the school did in response, Figueiredo said he was not made aware of what led up to the violence and instead advocated for a community-oriented response. Figueiredo encouraged students who do not feel safe, or have not felt safe in the past, to raise their concerns with adults.

== See also ==
- Education in Ontario
- List of secondary schools in Ontario
