= CBC Hamilton =

Local news operation in Ontario, Canada

CBC Hamilton is the Canadian Broadcasting Corporation's digital-only local news operation serving the city of Hamilton, Ontario, which launched on May 9, 2012. The operation currently consists of a Hamilton-focused section within the national CBC.ca website, and presences on various social media platforms.

The operation was announced on November 1, 2011, as part of the public broadcaster's five-year (2011–2015) strategic plan for improving service to various regions across Canada.

Unlike most of the other new or expanded regional services that are part of the 2015 strategic plan, the Hamilton operation did not initially include an over-the-air broadcasting component, due to financial considerations and the fact that Hamilton is within the coverage range of the main transmitters of the corporation's Toronto stations, including CBC Television's CBLT and CBC Radio One's CBLA, which focus their local programming on that city. Moreover, the availability of open FM radio frequencies in the Toronto-Hamilton region is extremely limited.

In the wake of Bell Media's attempts to acquire Astral Media, Hamilton councillor Brian McHattie called for the Canadian Radio-television and Telecommunications Commission to require that the combined company divest a station to the CBC, to permit the launch of a radio station serving Hamilton. A motion to the CRTC regarding this suggestion was passed unanimously by Hamilton City Council on March 27, 2013. While it did require Bell to divest two FM stations in Toronto when it approved the Bell-Astral merger, the CRTC did not impose a requirement that one of the stations be sold to the CBC; both stations were instead acquired by other private commercial broadcasters.

In March 2026, the CBC announced plans to launch a Hamilton-specific morning audio program later that year, which is slated to air on CBLA-FM's HD2 subchannel and the CBC's digital platforms.
