= Saltfleet District High School =

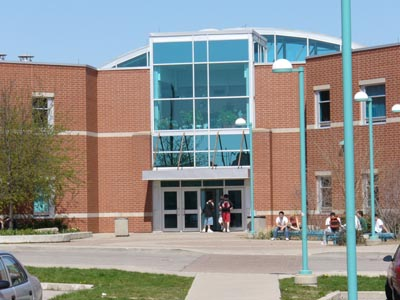

Location
- 108 Highland Road West; Stoney Creek, Ontario, L8J 2T2; Canada; 43.1837°N 79.77855°W

Information
- School type: Secondary
- Motto: Ad Altiora Nitamur (“We strive to the highest”)
- Founded: 1927
- Superintendent: Jeff Gillies
- Area trustee: Jeff Beattie
- Principal: Ms. K. Kindree
- Grades: 9-12
- Colours: Blue and Gold
- Mascot: Stormy
- Team name: The Storm
- Newspaper: The Forecast
- Website: www.hwdsb.on.ca/saltfleet/
- Last updated: February, 2018

Saltfleet District High School is a member school of the Hamilton-Wentworth District School Board.

Opened in 1996, Saltfleet is the most recent secondary school to be opened by the Board. The school had a 2009-2010 enrolment of 1250. The school uses the Ontario Secondary School Literacy Test (OSSLT) to assess Grade 10 students' skills in reading and writing. Successful completion of the test is one of 32 requirements students need to attain in order to receive an Ontario Secondary School Diploma. Saltfleet also offers special education classes as well as an ESL program and is one of two schools in Canada with a fully operated observatory.

The original Saltfleet District High School was opened in 1927, and had numerous additions to increase the number of rooms from 6 to 42. The new school was built to offer a bigger building with more up to date facilities.

== See also ==
- Education in Ontario
- List of secondary schools in Ontario
