= Sherwood Secondary School =

Coordinates: 43.22764°N 79.82320°W

- Hamilton Ontario; Canada

Information
- Established: 1967
- Superintendent: Simon Goodacre
- Area trustee: Kathy Archer
- Principal: Angela Ayeni
- Grades: 9-12
- Colour: Green
- Nickname: Saints
- Website: https://www.hwdsb.on.ca/sherwood

Sherwood Secondary School is a secondary school in Hamilton, Ontario. It is operated by the Hamilton-Wentworth District School Board. The school opened in 1967. 2013-2014 enrolment was 1050 students. Sherwood uses the Ontario Secondary School Literacy Test (OSSLT) to assess Grade 10 students' skills in reading and writing. Successful completion of the test is one of 32 requirements students require to earn an Ontario Secondary School Diploma. The school offers special education classes. In 2022, the school moved from its original site (25 High St, Hamilton ON) to the refurbished 75 Palmer Rd site (previously Barton Secondary School), to conduct renovations on the original building due to asbestos concerns on the second floor. Construction finished and students returned to 25 High street for the 2024-2025 school year.

== History ==
Sherwood Secondary School was founded in 1967. The school is named after the Sherwood Forest Survey area of Hamilton Mountain.

== See also ==
- Education in Ontario
- List of secondary schools in Ontario
