= Hamilton-Wentworth District School Board =

Public school board

Coordinates: 43.2209°N 79.8656°W

Address
- 20 Education Court Hamilton, Ontario, L9A 0B9; Canada

District information
- Type: School board
- Grades: JK–12^{th}
- Chief executive officer: Sheryl Robinson Petrazzini
- Chair of the board: Maria Felix Miller
- Governing agency: Ministry of Education
- Schools: 93
- Budget: CA$589.8 million (2021)

Students and staff
- Students: 50,000
- Colours: Blue & gold

Other information
- Website: hwdsb.on.ca

The Hamilton-Wentworth District School Board (HWDSB), formerly known as English-language Public District School Board No. 21 prior to 1999, is the public school board for the city of Hamilton. Established on January 1, 1998, via the amalgamation of the Hamilton and Wentworth County school boards, the board currently operates 93 elementary and secondary schools.

The board has approximately 50,000 students in its 93 neighbourhood schools. In addition to the programming offered at 80 elementary and 13 secondary schools, a number of alternative programs focusing on sports, academics, science, arts and languages are available.

The current director of education is Sheryl Robinson Petrazzini.

== Secondary schools ==
School	City neighbourhood	Grades
Ancaster High	Ancaster	9–12
Bernie Custis Secondary	Stipley	9–12
Dundas Valley Secondary	Dundas	9–12
Glendale Secondary	Hamilton East	9–12
Nora Frances Henderson Secondary	East Mountain	9–12
Orchard Park Secondary	Stoney Creek	9–12
Saltfleet District High	Stoney Creek Mountain	9–12
Sherwood Secondary	East Mountain	9–12
Sir Allan MacNab Secondary	West Mountain	9–12
Sir Winston Churchill Secondary	Hamilton East	9–12
Waterdown District High	Waterdown	9–12
Westdale Secondary	Westdale	9–12
Westmount Secondary	West Mountain	9–12

== Elementary schools ==
- A.A. Greenleaf
- A.M. Cunningham
- Adelaide Hoodless Public School
- Ancaster Meadow
- Balaclava
- Bell-Stone
- Bellmoore
- Bennetto
- Beverly Central
- Billy Green
- Buchanan Park
- C.B. Stirling
- C.H. Bray
- Cathy Wever
- Central
- Chedoke
- Collegiate Avenue
- Cootes Paradise
- Dalewood
- Dr. J. Seaton
- Dr. J.E Davey
- Dundana
- Dundas Central
- Earl Kitchener
- Eastdale
- Elizabeth Bagshaw
- Fessenden
- Flamborough Centre
- Frank Panabaker
- Franklin Road
- G.L. Armstrong
- Gatestone
- Glen Brae
- Glen Echo
- Glenwood
- Gordon Price
- Green Acres
- Greensville
- Guy Brown
- Helen Detwiler
- Hess Street
- Highview
- Hillcrest
- Holbrook
- Huntington Park
- James MacDonald
- Kanétskare
- King George
- Lake Avenue
- Lawfield
- Lincoln Alexander
- Linden Park
- Lisgar
- Mary Hopkins
- Memorial - Hamilton
- Millgrove
- Mount Albion
- Mount Hope
- Mountain View
- Mountview
- Norwood Park
- Parkdale
- Pauline Johnson
- Prince of Wales
- Queen Mary
- Queen Victoria
- Queensdale
- R.A. Riddell
- R.L. Hyslop
- Ray Lewis
- Richard Beasley
- Ridgemount
- Rockton
- Rosedale
- Rousseau
- Roxborough Park
- Shannen Koostachin
- Sir Isaac Brock
- Sir Wilfrid Laurier
- Sir William Osler
- Spencer Valley
- Strathcona
- Tapleytown
- Templemead
- Tiffany Hills
- Viola Desmond
- Viscount Montgomery
- W.H. Ballard
- Westview
- Westwood
- Winona
- Woodward Avenue
- Yorkview

== Former schools ==
Hamilton Central Collegiate Institute was a high school until 1985, and traced its history to Gore District Grammar School (1821) and Central School. Gore District and Central School merged in 1838, renamed as Hamilton High School in 1871, Hamilton Collegiate in 1897, and Hamilton Central Collegiate in 1923. HCI moved into Central High School of Commerce (established 1897) in 1950, and closed, with the building reused as a Sanford Avenue Elementary School from 1985 to 2011.

Queens Rangers Elementary School closed in 2019, after 60 years of service.

Parkside High School in Dundas, Ontario, closed in June 2014 at the end of the 2013/2014 school year. The building was subsequently demolished in 2017. There is a cemetery there now.

== Trustees ==
The HWDSB consists of 11 trustees elected from wards across the City of Hamilton. These wards either match or are the combination of multiple municipal wards for council elections. Trustees are elected for a four-year term during each municipal election.

The chair of the board, the vice-chair and the honorary treasurer are elected at the inaugural meeting of thebBoard, and serve for one year. Trustees are elected to serve parents, students, taxpayers and the school system, serving as the link between communities and the school board. They work to ensure Hamilton's public schools meet the diverse needs of students in their communities.

Elected trustees are joined by student trustees who are selected yearly from among Grade 7-12 students to represent the interests of students during deliberations and decision making of the board.

Hamilton-Wentworth District School Board trustees
Board	Election	Ward 1	Ward 2	Ward 3	Ward 4	Ward 5 & 10	Ward 6 & 9	Ward 7	Ward 8 & 14	Ward 11 & 12	Ward 13	Ward 15
2022–2026	2022	Elizabeth Wong	Sabreina Dahab	Maria Felix Miller	Abby Zaitley (from 2025)	Todd White	Kathy Archer	Dawn Danko	Becky Buck	Amanda Fehrman	Paul Tut	Graeme Noble
2022–2026	2022	Elizabeth Wong	Sabreina Dahab	Maria Felix Miller	Ray Mulholland (until 2024)	Todd White	Kathy Archer	Dawn Danko	Becky Buck	Amanda Fehrman	Paul Tut	Graeme Noble
Ward boundary redistribution
Board	Election	Ward 1 & 2	Ward 3	Ward 4	Ward 5	Ward 6	Ward 7	Ward 8 & 14	Ward 9 & 10	Ward 11 & 12	Ward 13	Ward 15
2018–2022	2018	Elizabeth Wong (from 2022)	Maria Felix Miller (from 2018)	Ray Mulholland	Carole Paikin-Miller	Kathy Archer	Dawn Danko	Becky Buck	Cam Galindo	Alex Johnstone	Paul Tut	Penny Deathe
2018–2022	2018	Christine Bingham (until 2022)	Chris Parkinson (until 2018)	Ray Mulholland	Carole Paikin-Miller	Kathy Archer	Dawn Danko	Becky Buck	Cam Galindo	Alex Johnstone	Paul Tut	Penny Deathe
Ward boundary redistribution
Board	Election	Ward 1 & 2	Ward 3	Ward 4	Ward 5	Ward 6	Ward 7	Ward 8	Ward 9 & 10	Ward 11 & 12	Ward 13	Ward 14 & 15
2014–2018	2014	Christine Bingham	Larry Pattison Jr.	Ray Mulholland	Todd White	Kathy Archer	Dawn Danko	Wes Hicks	Jeff Beattie	Alex Johnstone	Greg Van Geffen	Penny Deathe
2010–2014	2010	Judith Bishop	Tim Simmons	Ray Mulholland	Todd White	Laura Peddle	Lillian Orban	Wes Hicks	Bob Barlow (until 2013); Shirley Glauser (from 2013)	Alex Johnstone	Jessica Brennan	Karen Turkstra
2006–2010	2006	Judith Bishop	Tim Simmons	Ray Mulholland	Ron English	Laura Peddle	Lillian Orban	Wes Hicks	Bob Barlow	Shirley Glauser	Jessica Brennan	Karen Turkstra
2003–2006	2003	Judith Bishop	Eleanor Johnstone	Ray Mulholland	Wayne Marston	Kathy Archer	Lillian Orban	Al Pierce	John Davidson	Ian Thompson	Jessica Brennan	Reg Woodworth
2000–2003	2000	Judith Bishop	Eleanor Johnstone	Ray Mulholland	Wayne Marston	Laura Peddle	Lillian Orban	Wes Hicks	Bob Barlow	Ian Bruce Wallace	Ian Thompson	Reg Woodworth
Municipal amalgamation					Wayne Marston							
Board	Election	Ward 1 & 2	Ward 3	Ward 4	Ward 5	Ward 6	Ward 7	Ward 8	Stoney Creek	Ancaster-Wentworth	Dundas	Flamborough
1998–2000	1997	Judith Bishop	Eleanor Johnstone	Ray Mulholland	Joe Rogers	Laura Peddle	Lillian Orban	Wes Hicks	Janice Dewar	Ian Bruce Wallace	Heather Bullock	Reg Woodworth

== See also ==
- Hamilton-Wentworth Catholic District School Board
- High schools in Hamilton
- List of school districts in Ontario
- List of secondary schools in Ontario
