= 1980 Ontario municipal elections =

All municipalities in the Canadian province of Ontario held elections on November 10, 1980, to elect mayors, reeves, councillors, and school trustees. Some areas also held local referendums.

Incumbent mayors were defeated in several cities. The most closely watched contest was in Toronto, where challenger Art Eggleton defeated incumbent mayor John Sewell. In Hamilton, Jack MacDonald was ousted by William Powell. In Brantford, Dave Neumann defeated incumbent mayor Charles Bowen, while in Oshawa, Allan Pilkey defeated incumbent Jim Potticary.

Several other incumbent mayors were reelected, including Marion Dewar in Ottawa, Jim Gordon in Sudbury, Ross Archer in Barrie, Hazel McCallion in Mississauga, Bert Weeks in Windsor and Morley Rosenberg in Kitchener.

In the town of Tecumseh, outgoing councillor and unsuccessful mayoral candidate Cameron Frye came out as gay at the outgoing council's last caretaker meeting before the new council was sworn in, making him one of Canada's first known openly gay holders of political office. The campaign had been marked by rumours about Frye's sexuality, including the distribution of hate literature claiming that Frye would promote a "gay lifestyle" as mayor and would lead the town into "moral decay", although Frye had refused to confirm or deny the claims about his sexuality during the campaign.

== Elected mayors and reeves ==
- Ajax: Bill McLean
- Barrie: Ross Archer
- Belleville: George Zegouras
- Brampton: Jim Archdekin
- Brantford: Dave Neumann (details)
- Brockville: Peter Lewis
- Burlington: Roly Bird
- Caledon: John Clarkson
- Cambridge: Claudette Millar
- Chatham: Curtis Carter
- Cornwall: Gerald Parisien
- Dundas: Joe Bennett
- East York: Alan Redway (details)
- Etobicoke: Dennis Flynn (details)
- Flamborough: Betty Ward
- Fort Erie: Madeleine Faiazza
- Georgina: Joseph Dales
- Gloucester: Betty Stewart (details)
- Grimsby: Bob Arkell
- Guelph: Norm Jary
- Haldimand: Edith Fuller
- Halton Hills: Peter Pomeroy
- Hamilton: Bill Powell
- Kingston: John Gerretsen
- Kingston (Township): John Smale
- Kitchener: Morley Rosenberg
- London: Al Gleeson
- Markham: Tony Roman
- Milton: Gordon Krantz
- Mississauga: Hazel McCallion (details)
- Nanticoke: George Dmetriuc
- Nepean: Ben Franklin (details)
- Newcastle: Garnet Rickard
- Newmarket: Ray Twinney
- Niagara Falls: Wayne Thomson
- North Bay: Jack Smylie
- North York: Mel Lastman (details)
- Oakville: Harry Barrett
- Orillia: David Macdonald
- Oshawa: Allan Pilkey
- Ottawa: Marion Dewar (details)
- Owen Sound: Bob Rutherford
- Peterborough: Bob Barker
- Pickering: Jack Anderson
- Port Colborne: Bob Saracino
- Rayside-Balfour: Gilles Pelland
- Richmond Hill: Al Duffy
- Sarnia: Marceil Saddy
- Sault Ste. Marie: Don MacGregor
- Scarborough: Gus Harris (details)
- St. Catharines: Roy Adams
- Stoney Creek: Bill Sears
- Stratford: Ted Blowes
- St. Thomas: Doug Tarry
- Sudbury: Jim Gordon
- Thunder Bay: Walter Assef
- Timmins: Vic Power
- Toronto: Art Eggleton (details)
- Trenton: Duncan McDonald
- Valley East: Howard Armstrong
- Vanier: Wilfrid Champagne (details)
- Vaughan: Garnet Williams
- Waterloo: Marjorie Carroll
- Welland: Eugene Stranges
- Whitby: Robert Attersley
- Windsor: Bert Weeks
- Woodstock: Wendy Calder
- Woolwich: Ken Seiling
- York: Gayle Christie(details)
