= 2000 Hamilton, Ontario, municipal election =

Canadian municipal election

2000 Hamilton municipal election
- November 13, 2000
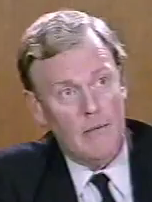

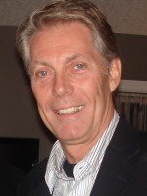
	RW
Candidate	Robert Wade	Bob Morrow
Popular vote	62,945	51,225
Percentage	42.27%	34.40%
		JM
Candidate	Fred Eisenberger	John C. Munro
Popular vote	15,112	14,090
Percentage	10.15%	9.46%
Mayor before election
Bob Morrow
Elected mayor
Robert Wade

The 2000 Hamilton municipal election was a municipal election held on November 13, 2000, to elect municipal officials for the City of Hamilton. On election day, Hamiltonians elected a mayor, 15 city councillors, and trustees for the Hamilton-Wentworth District School Board, Hamilton-Wentworth Catholic District School Board, Conseil scolaire Viamonde, and Conseil scolaire catholique MonAvenir. This was the first election of the "New" City of Hamilton after the dissolution of the Region of Hamilton-Wentworth and the amalgamation of Dundas, Stoney Creek, Flamborough, Ancaster, Glanbrook, and Waterdown with the existing city of Hamilton.

The amalgamation dissolved the independent councils of each suburban municipality and reduced the number of councillors elected in each ward from two to one.

== Mayoral election ==
The major upset was in the mayoral race, which was won by former Ancaster Mayor Robert Wade over incumbent Hamilton Mayor Bob Morrow.

Candidates for the November 13, 2000 Hamilton, Ontario Mayoral Election
Candidate	Popular vote		
Candidate	Votes	%	±%
Robert E. Wade	62,945	42.27%	n/a
Bob Morrow (incumbent)	51,225	34.40%	-41.60%
Fred Eisenberger	15,112	10.15%	n/a
John C. Munro	14,090	9.46%	n/a
Michael Baldasaro	1,637	1.1%	n/a
Bill Cottrell Jr.	1,358	0.91%	n/a
Julie Gordon	1,041	0.69%	n/a
C. A. Smith	394	0.26%	n/a
Bob Fanjoy	392	0.26%	n/a
Kris Heaton	290	0.20%	n/a
Richard H. Hennick	218	0.14%	n/a
Fern Rankin	196	0.13%	n/a
Total votes	148,898	100%	
Registered voters	n/a	n/a	n/a
Note: All Hamilton Municipal Elections are officially non-partisan. Note: Candidate campaign colours are based on the prominent colour used in campaign items (signs, literature, etc.) and are used as a visual differentiation between candidates.
Sources: Van Harten, Peter. "A feisty Munro has crash landing; Former Liberal cabinet member finishes fourth," The Hamilton Spectator, November 14, 2000, Decision 2000, D01.

== City Council Election ==
The 2000 election sent seven out of eight incumbents back to City Hall from the original city. The new suburban seats were all filled by individuals who were active in their respective town councils.

=== Ward 1 ===
Upon the announcement that the number of councillors elected per ward would be reduced to one, incumbent Councillor Mary Kiss announced her retirement. A fixture on council since 1982, Kiss was known for her hands-on approach to local government, facilitating improvements to local infrastructure and responding quickly to the needs of her constituents. Former Ward 1 councillor and Regional Chair Terry Cooke noted her retirement signalled "the end of an era."

By the end of September 2000, a number of candidates had registered. Among the candidates were Wally Zatylny, a wide receiver with the Hamilton Tiger-Cats from 1988 to 1994, Ray Paquette, the owner of a local restaurant and bar, Chuck McPhail, a former councillor in Brantford, and incumbent councillor Marvin Caplan. These candidates were joined by Phyllis Tresidder, the president of a local homeowner's association, Al Martino, the owner of a local nursing home, and Andy Straisfeld, a natural gas salesman.

The Ward 1 campaign was one of the most intense in the city, with the top candidates battling for the single seat. Tresidder, who received the endorsement of Kiss and former Hamilton West MPP and Minister of Colleges and Universities Richard Allen, was one of the first candidates to promote a website outlining their platform and e-mail as a way of communicating with voters. Tresidder highlighted environmental concerns, improved transit, and community consultation on developments as her main concerns.

Caplan, the incumbent councillor, was endorsed by former Mayor Jack MacDonald who noted that, though he was a hard working local politician, he was "often his own worst enemy.". Caplan sought to run a "balanced" campaign, saying he wanted to make sure the city was "taking care of the poorest among us while being fair to the wealthy." During the campaign, Caplan was the target of a coordinated sign theft campaign. During the first weekend of November 2000, Caplan lost over 350 signs valued at over $2,000. Speaking to the Hamilton Spectator, Caplan wouldn't accuse any of his opponents, but speculated that "someone got a truck, hired a crew of students and stayed up all night uprooting signs." Late in the campaign, Caplan was again targeted for his vote in favour of an expansion to Hamilton's urban boundary in a letter sent to Ward 1 residents by a group calling itself the "Responsible Ratepayers Coalition"

Zatylny focused his campaign on keeping taxes low, addressing issues caused by off-campus student housing around McMaster University, and saving the Chedoke ski hill. Martino's campaign generated the most controversy in the race. Criticized for living outside Ward 1, Martino and his brother made news before the election for concerns raised by employees and residents about their retirement home, St. Olga's Lifecare Centre in the Strathcona neighbourhood. During the campaign, which Martino ran from a rented double-decker bus, the candidate sent his campaign manager to accost Caplan while wearing a chicken suit to criticize the incumbent councillor for not attending a local debate. His campaign manager then picketed Caplan's office and was accused of calling the incumbent councillor and leaving voicemails consisting of "clucking" sounds. Caplan was caught by local ONTv cameras berating the man in the chicken suit.

McPhail ran for a seat on Brantford City Council in 1972, 1974, and 1976 before winning election for the city's fifth ward in 1980. He was re-elected in 1982 and did not seek re-election in 1985. He attempted to return to council in 1994, but was not successful. At one time, he served as chair of the Brant County Social Services committee. McPhail was a vocal critic of the transition board for the new, amalgamated city of Hamilton.

On November 13, 2000, Caplan secured a third term on council, telling the Spectator on election night, "I think I'm a pretty good member of council but maybe not that good as a politician." Tressider, who placed a strong second, noted how much she enjoyed the campaign, saying, "I enjoyed every moment of the campaign...There are way more nice people out there than nasty ones."

Candidates for the November 13, 2000 Hamilton, Ontario Ward 1 Councillor Election
Candidate	Popular vote		
Candidate	Votes	%	±%
Marvin Caplan (Incumbent)	3,054	30.07%	+3.67%
Phyllis Tresidder	2,092	20.60%	-
Wally Zatylny	1,771	17.44%	-
Ray Paquette	1,493	14.70%	-
Al Martino	1,459	14.37%	-
Chuck McPhail	183	1.80%	-
Andy Straisfeld	104	1.02%	-
Total votes	10,156		
Registered voters			
Note: All Hamilton Municipal Elections are officially non-partisan. Note: Candidate campaign colours are based on the prominent colour used in campaign items (signs, literature, etc.) and are used as a visual differentiation between candidates.

=== Ward 2 ===
The Ward 2 council race pit colleagues Andrea Horwath and Ron Corsini against one another for the new single downtown seat. Despite political differences (Horwath's connections to the NDP and Corsini's relationship with the Liberal Party), both councillors earned a reputation for working well together on ward issues.

Horwath's campaign focused on developing a sense of pride in the new City of Hamilton and continuing work to bring new jobs to downtown Hamilton. The incumbent councillor also cited a need for supporting social services, cleaning up the city's waterfront, and strengthening local Business Improvement Areas. During the campaign, former Mayor Jack MacDonald drew some controversy when, in endorsing Corsini, lambasted Horwath, writing in the Spectator that the councillor "has too often been co-opted by the dark side of council. When push comes to shove, Andrea shows herself to be a left-wing socialist." Horwath received the endorsement of former Progressive Conservative-affiliated regional chair Terry Cooke and New Democrat MPP David Christopherson.

Corsini's campaign focused on imposing limits on lodging homes and social housing, supporting the Red Hill Valley Expressway and a new waterfront highway, and proposed abolishing wards and creating an at-large council. Corsini, a local property owner and former grocer, received the endorsement of Hamilton West MP Stan Keyes in his bid for re-election.

Horwath and Corsini were joined in the race by former Ward 2 councillor Ed Fisher. Fisher, who served on council from 1976 to 1980, ran a restaurant on James Street North and cited taxes as his primary concern for running. He was accused by Corsini of only seeking election in opposition to a new city bylaw that limited smoking in restaurants.

During the campaign, neither Horwath or Corsini lived in the ward; Horwath lived in the Landsdale neighbourhood in Ward 3 while Corsini resided on Hamilton Mountain.

On election night, Horwath won nearly all of the 16 polls in the ward and secured just over 50% of the vote.

Candidates for the November 13, 2000 Hamilton, Ontario Ward 2 Councillor Election
Candidate	Popular vote		
Candidate	Votes	%	±%
Andrea Horwath (Incumbent)	4,192	50.11%	+20.73%
Ron Corsini (Incumbent)	3,263	39%	+11.44%
Ed Fisher	911	10.89%	-
Total votes	8,366		
Registered voters			
Note: All Hamilton Municipal Elections are officially non-partisan. Note: Candidate campaign colours are based on the prominent colour used in campaign items (signs, literature, etc.) and are used as a visual differentiation between candidates.

=== Ward 3 ===
Ward 3's council election saw two incumbents - Bernie Morelli and Dennis Haining - competing for the new single seat. Morelli, a three-term incumbent and former school trustee, was a recent retiree from Dofasco. He stood on a vague campaign of "serving the people of the ward". Morelli was criticized during the campaign for not residing in the ward and for handing out official business cards paid for by taxpayers during the campaign. At the time, there was speculation that Morelli would use his council seat as a springboard to launch a campaign for mayor.

One-term incumbent Haining, a local Beer Store employee, promoted his record of producing a business guide to Ward 3, tackling absentee landlords, and ensuring that the burden of civic revenue collection wasn't passed to fee increases over property taxes. Speaking with the Spectator, Haining noted his main issue was "quality of life. Whether you rent or own, home is home."

First-time candidate Ron Monahan ran on a platform of hiring more police officers, reforming social assistance, and protecting the Red Hill Creek. Monahan caused a stir when his campaign literature featured a glowing letter written about his community work by Morelli.

On election night, Morelli earned nearly 2,000 more votes than Haining and captured the seat. Speaking with the Spectator, he attributed his victory to his handling of ward issues like parking, prostitution, and traffic. Haining told the Spectator, "The message I heard at the door is that people wanted to keep both of us...Unfortunately, with restructuring only one can win. I wish him well." Monahan said he encountered confusion during the campaign thanks to the overlapping federal election and voter confusion over where to cast a ballot.

Candidates for the November 13, 2000 Hamilton, Ontario Ward 3 Councillor Election
Candidate	Popular vote		
Candidate	Votes	%	±%
Bernie Morelli (Incumbent)	5,043	58.78%	%
Dennis Haining (Incumbent)	3,049	35.54%	%
Ron Monahan	488	5.69%	-
Total votes	8,580		
Registered voters			
Note: All Hamilton Municipal Elections are officially non-partisan. Note: Candidate campaign colours are based on the prominent colour used in campaign items (signs, literature, etc.) and are used as a visual differentiation between candidates.

=== Ward 4 ===
The Ward 4 council race was marked by Geraldine Copps' announcement that she would not seek a sixth term in office. Copps, the wife of former Mayor Victor Copps and mother of former Deputy Prime Minister Sheila Copps, Gerladine was consistently the top vote scorer in Ward 4. Copps entered local politics when her appointment as a citizenship judge was ended. A long-time Liberal, Copps' appointment was terminated by Prime Minister Brian Mulroney's Progressive Conservative government after their victory in 1984. Copps noted in an exit interview with the Spectator that she was most proud of her environmental stances and opposition to the amalgamation of Hamilton with surrounding suburban communities, declaring that she would campaign against the Red Hill Valley Expressway in her retirement.

Remaining incumbent councillor Dave Wilson signaled his intention to seek another term despite controversy. Wilson was the subject of a formal harassment complaint after sharing sexually-inappropriate jokes with city staff using his formal councillor's email address. Wilson faced scrutiny for a libel suit against a former councillor and an employee of the regional sewage plant in which a judge called Wilson "disingenuous". The suit, which centred around Wilson's claim that former councillor John Gallagher had menaced an employee with a cane, ended up costing taxpayers $340,000.

By late August 2000, a battle for Copps' legacy began to play out in Ward 4. A proxy battle between two sides of a bitter civil war within the Liberal Party between Shelia Copps and then Finance Minister Paul Martin was anticipated when Copps-loyalist Sam Merulla and Craig Dowhaniuk, a supporter of Martin and Hamilton West MP Stan Keyes filed to contest the seat. Merulla, 33, was then a Vice President of the Ontario Liberal Party, the former executive assistant to Hamilton East MPP Dominic Agostino and Shelia Copps' preferred candidate to replace her retiring mother. Dowhaniuk, 38, was Keyes' campaign manager in 1997, the President of the Hamilton West Liberal Party Association, and an Ontario Liberal Party candidate for Hamilton East in 1990. Both candidates were politically experienced in the municipal field as well; Merulla, a resident of Hamilton Mountain at the time, unsuccessfully sought a Ward 3 council seat in 1997 while Dowhaniuk served as a Catholic School Trustee and faced off against Domenic Agostino in a 1987 council by-election. Before the close of nominations, Dowhaniuk quietly withdrew his name from contention.

William Godfrey ran on a platform of addressing the environmental issues in the Ward, which is home to many of the city's heavy industries and two closed toxic dump sites. A particular issue to him was the smell coming from the Hamilton Sewage Plant on Woodward Avenue. Bob Lewis, a candidate in Stoney Creek in 1997, campaigned on a platform of better managing local concerns over the Red Hill Valley Expressway and the Solid Waste Reduction Unit (SWARU) incinerator, as well as painting crosswalks with fluorescent paint and securing after-hours access to local schools. Pino Gallo aimed at working with local industry to re-purpose buildings as job creation centres, though generated controversy when he gave out his phone number which connected to an answering machine announcing he was already the Ward 4 councillor.

Wilson derided the campaign as "the ugliest, dirtiest campaign I've ever seen." Merulla's campaign was accused of sending anonymous flyers highlighting Wilson's legal problems, while Wilson's campaign accused Merulla of violating election finance laws. The other candidates in the race noted the negative tone and excessive spending by both candidates hampered their chances, though Godfrey announced he would contest the seat again in 2003. He did not register for that election. On election night, Merulla would top Wilson by exactly 400 votes.

Candidates for the November 13, 2000 Hamilton, Ontario Ward 4 Councillor Election
Candidate	Popular vote		
Candidate	Votes	%	±%
Sam Merulla	4,647	47.92%	-
Dave Wilson (Incumbent)	4,247	43.79%	-
Bob Lewis	480	4.95%	-
William Godfrey	190	2%	-
Pino Gallo	134	1.4%	-
Total votes	9,698		
Registered voters	27,121	35.76%	
Note: All Hamilton Municipal Elections are officially non-partisan. Note: Candidate campaign colours are based on the prominent colour used in campaign items (signs, literature, etc.) and are used as a visual differentiation between candidates.

=== Ward 5 ===
Candidates for the November 13, 2000 Hamilton, Ontario Ward 5 Councillor Election
Candidate	Popular vote		
Candidate	Votes	%	±%
Chad Collins (Incumbent)	9,473	87.05%	-
Lakhwinder Multani	1,409	12.95%	-
Total votes	10,882		
Registered voters			
Note: All Hamilton Municipal Elections are officially non-partisan. Note: Candidate campaign colours are based on the prominent colour used in campaign items (signs, literature, etc.) and are used as a visual differentiation between candidates.

=== Ward 6 ===
Candidates for the November 13, 2000 Hamilton, Ontario Ward 6 Councillor Election
Candidate	Popular vote		
Candidate	Votes	%	±%
Tom Jackson (Incumbent)	11,492	88.6%	-
David Riess	1,479	11.4%	-
Total votes	12,971		
Registered voters			
Note: All Hamilton Municipal Elections are officially non-partisan. Note: Candidate campaign colours are based on the prominent colour used in campaign items (signs, literature, etc.) and are used as a visual differentiation between candidates.

=== Ward 7 ===
The central Hamilton Mountain race was characterized by incumbent Ward 7 councillor Terry Anderson's announcement that he would not seek another term on council. First elected in 1991, Anderson noted the completion of the Lincoln M. Alexander Parkway was a signature success and that he was stepping aside to prepare himself to seek federal office in the riding of Hamilton Mountain. This was complicated by his desire to stand as a Liberal, as the seat was already held by Liberal Beth Phinney. Upon his announcement, former Ward 7 councillor Henry Merling announced he was considering a political comeback, having been defeated by Bill Kelly in the previous election. He ultimately decided to not contest the seat.

In August 2000, local conservative activist Mark Alan Whittle announced he was dropping out of the mayoral race and registering to run for the Ward 7 council seat. Whittle had contested the Ward 7 seat in 1994 and 1997 and was known for being a prolific letter writer to local newspapers and politicians. Whittle's campaign focused on a pledge to have no new tax increases during his time in office.

Incumbent Bill Kelly sought election after local media praised his first term. Kelly, a former radio broadcaster, ran on a platform of tax cuts and continued service. Though he stopped short of an endorsement, local entrepreneur Ron Foxcroft donated to Kelly's campaign, noting "I'll be blunt. I was one of the people who persuaded Bill Kelly to run for his first term and I'm not bailing out on him."

Chris Charlton sought the Ward 7 seat on a platform of stopping government waste, maintaining the city's urban boundary, halting privatization of government services, saving urban greenspace, and bringing mixed incomes into the downtown core. Charlton, a past NDP candidate on Hamilton Mountain federally in 1997 and provincially in 1999, was the spouse of former Hamilton Mountain MPP Brian Charlton. Former Mayor Jack MacDonald, writing in the Spectator, critiqued Charlton for her opposition to the Red Hill Valley Expressway.

On election night, Kelly was interviewed by the Spectator and expressed nervousness at the results, saying "With the Bush-Gore thing, who knows what's going to happen in elections?" Kelly won the night, earning over 4,000 more votes than Charlton, who the Spectator noted maintained her sense of humour in defeat by saying "It cured me of a superstition...I no longer think three times is a charm!"

Candidates for the November 13, 2000 Hamilton, Ontario Ward 7 Councillor Election
Candidate	Popular vote		
Candidate	Votes	%	±%
Bill Kelly (Incumbent)	10,482	60.83%	+32.12%
Chris Charlton	6,011	34.88%	-
Mark Allan Whittle	740	4.29%	-0.51%
Total votes	17,233	100%	
Registered voters	39,377	43.76	
Note: All Hamilton Municipal Elections are officially non-partisan. Note: Candidate campaign colours are based on the prominent colour used in campaign items (signs, literature, etc.) and are used as a visual differentiation between candidates.

=== Ward 8 ===
Candidates for the November 13, 2000 Hamilton, Ontario Ward 8 Councillor Election
Candidate	Popular vote		
Candidate	Votes	%	±%
Frank D'Amico (Incumbent)	6,826	41.27%	
Duke O'Sullivan (Incumbent)	5,161	31.2%	-
George Morasse	2,750	14.81%	-
Mike Oddi	1,555	9.45%	-
Wayne Boychuk	248	1.5%	-
Total votes	16,540	100%	
Registered voters			
Note: All Hamilton Municipal Elections are officially non-partisan. Note: Candidate campaign colours are based on the prominent colour used in campaign items (signs, literature, etc.) and are used as a visual differentiation between candidates.

=== Ward 9 ===
Ward 9, newly created from the former Stoney Creek wards 1, 6, and 7, drew three high-profile candidates. Anne Bain, the last Mayor of Stoney Creek, opted to run in Ward 9 despite living in Ward 10. Bain ran on a platform of limiting development to manage transportation issues and supporting the construction of the Red Hill Valley Expressway. Former Stoney Creek Ward 7 councillor Paul Miller also opted to run in Ward 9. Miller's platform also addressed truck traffic in upper Stoney Creek and was also supportive of the expressway plan. The final candidate was incumbent Ward 6 councillor Bob Charters. Charters' wardmate, Tom Jackson, had decided to seek re-election and, rather than fight Jackson for the single Ward 6 seat, Charters made the decision to stand in Ward 9. Miller criticized Charters' plan, as he still lived in Ward 6, telling the Spectator "All I can say is he's welcome to try. I imagine (voters) will have their opinion on it and maybe they'll wonder why he's chosen to do that."

During the campaign, Bain drew attention for her relaxed style, sporting tracksuits and running shoes on the campaign trail. Bain told the Spectator, "I'm not going to canvass in high heels. I'm not out there to impress people with what I'm wearing. And the women I meet at the door, they are not dressed up." The campaign featured a notable lack of hostility toward Stoney Creek's amalgamation with Hamilton, with voters noting they believed their community would retain its character and that the merger would make it more possible for the Red Hill Valley Expressway to be built.

On election night, the ward's race was one of the city's closest. Bain earned 64 more votes than Miller, with Charters very close begind. The closeness of the election prompted Miller to request a formal recount, with his campaign claiming 154 more votes were cast than counted. The resulting recount only added 46 more ballots and reaffirmed Bain as the winner of the election.

Candidates for the November 13, 2000 Hamilton, Ontario Ward 9 Councillor Election
Candidate	Popular vote		
Candidate	Votes	%	±%
Anne Bain	2,703	35.87%	
Paul Miller	2,631	35.78%	-
Bob Charters	2,201	29.21%	-
Total votes	7,535	100%	
Registered voters	17,306	43.54%	
Note: All Hamilton Municipal Elections are officially non-partisan. Note: Candidate campaign colours are based on the prominent colour used in campaign items (signs, literature, etc.) and are used as a visual differentiation between candidates.

=== Ward 10 ===
The neawly created Ward 10 encompassed much of the former town of Stoney Creek below the Niagara Escarpment. A diverse ward, it included many of the city's cultural communities, with the Spectator commenting on the ward's "large Italian, Croatian, Serbian, Polish, German and Dutch populations, as well as a growing Sikh community."

A number of Stoney Creek's local politicians registered to seek the open Ward 10 seat. Former deputy mayor Albert Marrone, and former councillors Larry Di Ianni and Maria Pearson faced off for the seat while the last Mayor of Stoney Creek, Anne Bain, had originally registered for the seat but dropped out and re-registered in Ward 9 before the close of nominations. Di Ianni was first elected in 1982 and ran on a platform of his experience and keeping the Stoney Creek Town Hall open. The former 6-term councillor was notable for using a website to get his message across. Marrone, who did not live in the ward, ran on a platform of lowering taxes while continuing to keep services functioning as well as improving roads and local infrastructure. Pearson, a Stoney Creek councillor since 1991, campaigned on maintaining the community's identity and working with other councillors as a team. The three former politicians were joined by Tejinder Singh, the operator of a local import-export business who complained about a lack of engagement from local politicians, poor local public transportation, and the siting of the Taro Landfill in the area.

During the campaign, Di Ianni complained of rampant sign vandalism, telling the Spectator "I look around and all the Pearson and Marrone signs seem to be up. And just the Di Ianni signs are down." All Ward 10 candidates complained about confusion among voters about where polls were being held and when voting was occurring.

Candidates for the November 13, 2000 Hamilton, Ontario Ward 10 Councillor Election
Candidate	Popular vote		
Candidate	Votes	%	±%
Larry Di Ianni	2,353	34.78%	-
Maria Pearson	2,179	32.21%	-
Albert Marrone	1,839	27.18%	-
Tejinder Singh	395	5.84%	-
Total votes	6,766	100%	
Registered voters	19,224	35.2%	
Note: All Hamilton Municipal Elections are officially non-partisan. Note: Candidate campaign colours are based on the prominent colour used in campaign items (signs, literature, etc.) and are used as a visual differentiation between candidates.

=== Ward 11 ===
In early September, the last Mayor of Glanbrook, Glen Everington, and former Glanbrook regional council member Dave Mitchell announced they would be contesting the new seat, which blended the former municipality of Glanbrook with parts of rural Stoney Creek.

Candidates for the November 13, 2000 Hamilton, Ontario Ward 11 Councillor Election
Candidate	Popular vote		
Candidate	Votes	%	±%
Dave Mitchell	5,530	75.51%	-
Frank Cefaloni	1,167	15.93%	-
Frank Ciotti	455	6.21%	-
Orazio Celli	172	2.35%	-
Total votes	7,324	100%	
Registered voters		%	
Note: All Hamilton Municipal Elections are officially non-partisan. Note: Candidate campaign colours are based on the prominent colour used in campaign items (signs, literature, etc.) and are used as a visual differentiation between candidates.

=== Ward 12 ===
Ward 12 was formed from the urban parts of the Town of Ancaster.

Two former Ancaster council members, Murray Ferguson and Brian Kerman entered the race to represent the new ward on Hamilton City Council. Ferguson, who earned the endorsement of former mayor Jack MacDonald, was a local businessman and active citizen, serving on the Hamilton Conservation Authority, local volunteer boards, and had twice been nominated as Ancaster's "Citizen of the Year". Ferguson, who was first elected to Ancaster Town Council in 1994, campaigned on incorporating Ancaster into Hamilton in a harmonious way and better listening to community groups. Kerman, elected to Ancaster's council in 1997, had recently been unsuccessful in an attempt to secure the Liberal Party nomination to stand in a by-election in Ancaster-Dundas-Flamborough-Aldershot. Kerman was vehemently opposed to amalgamation and promised to pursue legal action to separate Ancaster from Hamilton.

Ferguson and Kerman were joined by former Hamilton-Wentworth Catholic District School Board trustee John Rocchi, who campaigned on increasing children's sports facilities and Steve Zivanic, a retired businessman and a member of an anti-Hamilton Airport activist group.

Ferguson won with over 52% of the vote, telling the Spectator that he was "scared to death" of his win, but was eager to work for his constituents.

Candidates for the November 13, 2000 Hamilton, Ontario Ward 12 Councillor Election
Candidate	Popular vote		
Candidate	Votes	%	±%
Murray Ferguson	4,964	52.43%	-
Brian Kerman	2,458	25.96%	-
John Rocchi	1,838	19.41%	-
Steve Zivanic	208	2.2%	-
Total votes	9,468	100%	
Registered voters			
Note: All Hamilton Municipal Elections are officially non-partisan. Note: Candidate campaign colours are based on the prominent colour used in campaign items (signs, literature, etc.) and are used as a visual differentiation between candidates.

=== Ward 13 ===
Candidates for the November 13, 2000 Hamilton, Ontario Ward 13 Councillor Election
Candidate	Popular vote		
Candidate	Votes	%	±%
Russ Powers	5,021	58.47%	-
Keith Sharp	2,858	33.28%	-
Sean Ernst	709	8.26%	-
Total votes	8,588	100%	
Registered voters			
Note: All Hamilton Municipal Elections are officially non-partisan. Note: Candidate campaign colours are based on the prominent colour used in campaign items (signs, literature, etc.) and are used as a visual differentiation between candidates.

=== Ward 14 ===
Ward 14 was created from rural parts of Ancaster and the village of Jerseyville in the former county of Wentworth. Despite being the largest ward in terms of area at 414 square kilometres - one third of the city's landmass - it had the fewest eligible voters of any ward. At the time, the ward had no municipal water or sewer services and relied on local septic systems.

Four well-known candidates sought the new rural seat. Former Flamborough Deputy Mayor Dave Braden faced off against former Flamborough Ward 5 councillor Paul Kidd. Arend Kersten, the former editor of a local newspaper, the Flamborough Review, and local farmer Denise Harvey also contested the seat. Braden was a controversial figure, having previously accused regional politicians of corruption without proof and suggested residents of Flamborough may rise up in "outright rebellion" if the area was merged with Hamilton. Kidd campaigned on making improvements to Highway 6. Kidd, who was also skeptical of amalgamation, also proposed modified rural bus service, protecting the area's rural identity, and being a vigilant local tax watchdog.

Candidates for the November 13, 2000 Hamilton, Ontario Ward 14 Councillor Election
Candidate	Popular vote		
Candidate	Votes	%	±%
Dave Braden	2,412	47.43%	-
Arend Kersten	1,325	26.06%	-
Paul Kidd	1,057	20.79%	-
Denise Harvey	289	5.7%	-
Total votes	5,085	100%	
Registered voters	11,825	43%	
Note: All Hamilton Municipal Elections are officially non-partisan. Note: Candidate campaign colours are based on the prominent colour used in campaign items (signs, literature, etc.) and are used as a visual differentiation between candidates.

=== Ward 15 ===
Candidates for the November 13, 2000 Hamilton, Ontario Ward 15 Councillor Election
Candidate	Popular vote		
Candidate	Votes	%	±%
Margaret McCarthy	3,447	57.67%	-
Joe Van Overberghe	2,530	42.33%	-
Total votes	5,977	100%	
Registered voters			
Note: All Hamilton Municipal Elections are officially non-partisan. Note: Candidate campaign colours are based on the prominent colour used in campaign items (signs, literature, etc.) and are used as a visual differentiation between candidates.

== See also ==
- List of Hamilton, Ontario, municipal elections
