= Pride Hamilton =

Pride event in Hamilton, Ontario, Canada

Pride Hamilton is an annual LGBTQ Pride event, staged in Hamilton, Ontario. Unlike some Pride events, the event does not currently stage a parade, but includes a week of LGBTQ-oriented community events culminating with a community festival in the city's Gage Park.

The event was launched in 1991 by Hamilton's Gay and Lesbian Alliance (GALA), but was immediately mired in controversy over mayor Bob Morrow's refusal to issue a civic proclamation. Morrow cited a lack of consensus among Hamilton City Council rather than any personal animus against LGBT people, although councillor Dominic Agostino tried to broker a compromise under which Morrow would write a welcome letter instead of a formal civic proclamation. GALA filed a complaint with the Ontario Human Rights Commission, which was heard in 1994; in the hearing, Morrow's lawyers mounted the defense that Morrow's actions were not discriminatory as he had no way of knowing that the members of GALA were actually gay, a line of argument which GALA's lawyers dismissed as absurd.

The commission ruled in March 1995 that Morrow's refusal to issue a proclamation was discriminatory, and ordered him to pay $5,000 in damages to GALA and to issue the proclamation in 1995. Morrow issued a proclamation that year, but concurrently announced that he would cease issuing any further civic proclamations for any events at all.

The event was transferred from GALA to a new independent Hamilton Pride committee in 1996. Bob Wade, Morrow's successor as mayor, reinstated civic proclamations, and issued a civic proclamation of the event in 2001.

The 2019 event was disrupted by a violent anti-LGBTQ protest. The Hamilton Police Service subsequently faced criticism, both for taking too long to respond to the immediate situation and for its post-confrontation arrests, which initially targeted people who were defending the event against the violence rather than the instigators of it. Later arrests did include some of the protestors. The community reaction included direct pickets of mayor Fred Eisenberger's home, which Eisenberger characterized as inappropriate harassment of his family and as not representative of the city's LGBTQ community. In 2021, Pride Hamilton filed a formal complaint to the Ontario Human Rights Tribunal over the police delay in responding to the 2019 incident.
