= Jack MacDonald (Hamilton politician) =

Canadian politician (1927–2010)

Mayor of Hamilton, Ontario
- In office 1977–1980
- Preceded by: Vince Agro
- Succeeded by: William Powell

Personal details
- Born: 1927 London, Ontario, Canada
- Died: May 5, 2010 (aged 82) Hamilton, Ontario, Canada
- Spouse: Jessie Thomson
- Profession: Politician, businessman, journalist

John Alexander "Jack" MacDonald (1927 – May 5, 2010) was a politician, businessman, and journalist in Hamilton, Ontario, Canada. He served as Mayor of Hamilton from 1976 to 1980, and wrote a column in the Hamilton Spectator newspaper for many years.

== Early life and career ==
MacDonald was born in 1927 in London, Ontario and moved to Hamilton, Ontario in 1942. At the age of 15 he quit school and at 16 joined the Canadian Navy, becoming a qualified torpedo man. After the Second World War he apprenticed with his father and uncle as a plumber, before starting his own heating and cooling business in 1951. In 1949 he became the youngest alderman ever elected in the City of Hamilton. He was also the youngest person to be elected to public office at that time in Canada. In 1953 he became deputy mayor. He ran for Mayor of Hamilton in 1956 and 1962 but lost.

He was elected citizen of the year in 1972 and ran again for mayor in 1976, this time winning. He was re-elected again in 1978.

== Community service ==
- Member of three member Steering Committee, responsible for present Hamilton East Kiwanis Boy's Club.
- Lt. Governor for District 6, Chairman of the Board of Hamilton East Kiwanis Boy's and Girls Club which provides service to over 3000 boys and girls in Hamilton East.
- Hamilton East Kiwanis member for over 50 years.
- Original member of the Board of Kiwanis Homes.
- Chairman of United Appeal.
- Volunteer Chairman for United Services.
- President of Kiwanis Hamilton East 1971.
- Vice-Chairman of Health Disciplines Board of the Province of Ontario, which deals with five health disciplines throughout Ontario 1973-1976.
- Life member of YMCA.
- Chairman, 1976 Fundraiser Campaign to rebuild downtown YMCA.
- Volunteer Chairman of Grey Cup Festival in Hamilton 1972.
- Chairman 1970 Keep Football in Hamilton Committee, built North Stands 1972.
- Awarded the Distinguished Citizen of the Year 1973 for voluntary community work, particularly the Grey Cup Festival.
- Established the committee which led to the formation of Opera Hamilton.
- Original Director and Chairman of the Executive Committee for the John G. Diefenbaker Foundation.
- Awarded the Wright Award for Originality in Housing the Kiwanis Barton Street Project.
- Honor for Citizenship during the Cities 150th birthday celebrations 1976 and a $40,000.00 bursary named at McMaster.
- Presented the Fred McAllister Award for 1983. This award is presented annually to one judged the Outstanding Kiwanian in Eastern Canada and the Caribbean.
- Inducted into the Gallery of Distinction 1993.
- Received honorary doctorate from McMaster University.

== Mayor of Hamilton ==
MacDonald was a colourful figure in office, and endorsed several large development projects for the city. In 1978, he led the city council into accepting a multimillion-dollar plan for an office tower and convention centre in downtown Hamilton. The plan, which resulted in the Hamilton Convention Centre and the Ellen Fairclough Building above it, was formally endorsed by the provincial government later in the year. He also endorsed a pledge by the federal government to assist in construction of a National Hockey League-sized arena for the city in 1979, and argued that Hamilton deserved a team in the next NHL expansion. In 1980, the city approved an $80 million plan for a football stadium and arena.

In 1979, he approved a freeway construction project which eventually became known as the Red Hill Creek Expressway. MacDonald himself owned a house on the Red Hill Valley, where the highway corridor was slated to run. He was quoted as saying, "I would prefer it in somebody else's backyard but I've got a greater responsibility than that". In 1980, he supported plans by the Hamilton Harbour commissioners to build for an industrial area on the city's Beach Strip. He also encouraged airport expansion and upgrades to the city's transit system.

He was an early supporter of one-tier government for the Hamilton region, and in May 1978 supported a provincial commission report which called for Hamilton to be amalgamated with neighbouring municipalities. This plan was opposed by many in the municipalities, who worried that the city would burden them with financial costs and overwhelm their local identities. The provincial government rejected the one-tier recommendation and MacDonald, in protest, insisted that the province pay the full cost of the commission report.

MacDonald endorsed property tax assessment reform in 1978, noting that the city had lost $1.5 million in appeals the previous year. Conservative in matters of perceived government interference, he opposed plans for mandatory smoke detectors in Hamilton apartments and was openly contemptuous of the city's anti-smoking by-law.

With no strong opposition candidates, MacDonald was easily re-elected mayor in November 1978. He was unexpectedly defeated in 1980, losing to a 73-year-old. He was a former chairman of the regional conservation authority and a former alderman for the City of Hamilton. William Powell who was unknown before the election. The Globe and Mail described the result as a "major upset". Powell won the election by promising integrity in government and by criticizing MacDonald as arrogant and uncompromising, describing him as "a good salesman but a poor manager". MacDonald launched a strong bid for re-election in 1982, but lost to Bob Morrow.

It has been reported that MacDonald reached an agreement with Toronto Maple Leafs owner Harold Ballard near the end of his mandate, to bring the Colorado Rockies hockey franchise to Hamilton in 1982. His successor is said to have rejected the arrangement, causing the plan to fall through.

== Federal politics ==
MacDonald was a strong supporter of the Progressive Conservative Party at the federal level. He supported Paul Hellyer's bid for the party leadership in 1976, although he also became an admirer of Joe Clark's abilities during the same campaign. During his tenure as mayor, he once presented Clark with a novelty "Trudeau pencil", mocking Liberal prime minister Pierre Trudeau. The pencil had an eraser on both ends, and no point.

In 1979, he was an honorary pallbearer at the funeral of former prime minister John Diefenbaker.

He campaigned for the House of Commons of Canada in the 1984 federal election, running for the Progressive Conservative Party in Hamilton East. The PCs did not have a strong support base in this region, and he finished third with 30.5 per cent against Liberal candidate Sheila Copps and New Democrat David Christopherson. This loss effectively ended his career as a politician. The Progressive Conservatives won a majority government under Brian Mulroney, and MacDonald was appointed to the federal parole board.

== Journalist ==
MacDonald wrote on political matters for the Hamilton Spectator throughout the 1990s, and into the 2000s. He continued to support plans for the Red Hill Creek Expressway and regional amalgamation, and frequently wrote in support of mayor Bob Morrow and regional chair Terry Cooke. In 2000, he supported Bob Wade over Morrow for mayor.

He remained a supporter of the Progressive Conservative Party at the federal level, and wrote pieces supporting party leader Jean Charest while criticizing the rival right-wing Reform Party of Preston Manning. He voted for Joe Clark to return as Progressive Conservative leader in 1999, although he also argued that both Clark and Manning would need to leave the federal scene for a united conservative party to emerge.

MacDonald supported the Progressive Conservative government of Mike Harris at the provincial level, although he also wrote a piece strongly critical of the government just prior to the 1999 provincial election. MacDonald argued that Harris "betrayed" Hamilton-Wentworth by refusing to impose one-tier government, and openly speculated about voting against the Progressive Conservatives for the first time in his life. He was later reconciled with the government, and argued that Harris was the logical choice to lead a united federal conservative party.

He retired from the Spectator in late 2002.

== Since 2002 ==
MacDonald supported Larry Di Ianni's bid to become mayor of Hamilton in 2003, and became involved with the new Conservative Party of Canada in early 2004. There was speculation throughout 2004 that the Red Hill Creek Expressway would be renamed after MacDonald, but this proposal was defeated by council in 2005. He underwent open heart surgery in September 2004.

When asked about his legacy after being discharged from hospital, he said, "There are very, very few people who are neutral about Jack MacDonald, and I like it that way".

== Death ==
MacDonald died in a Hamilton hospice on May 5, 2010, at the age of 82.
