= Fred Eisenberger =

55th and 57th mayor of Hamilton

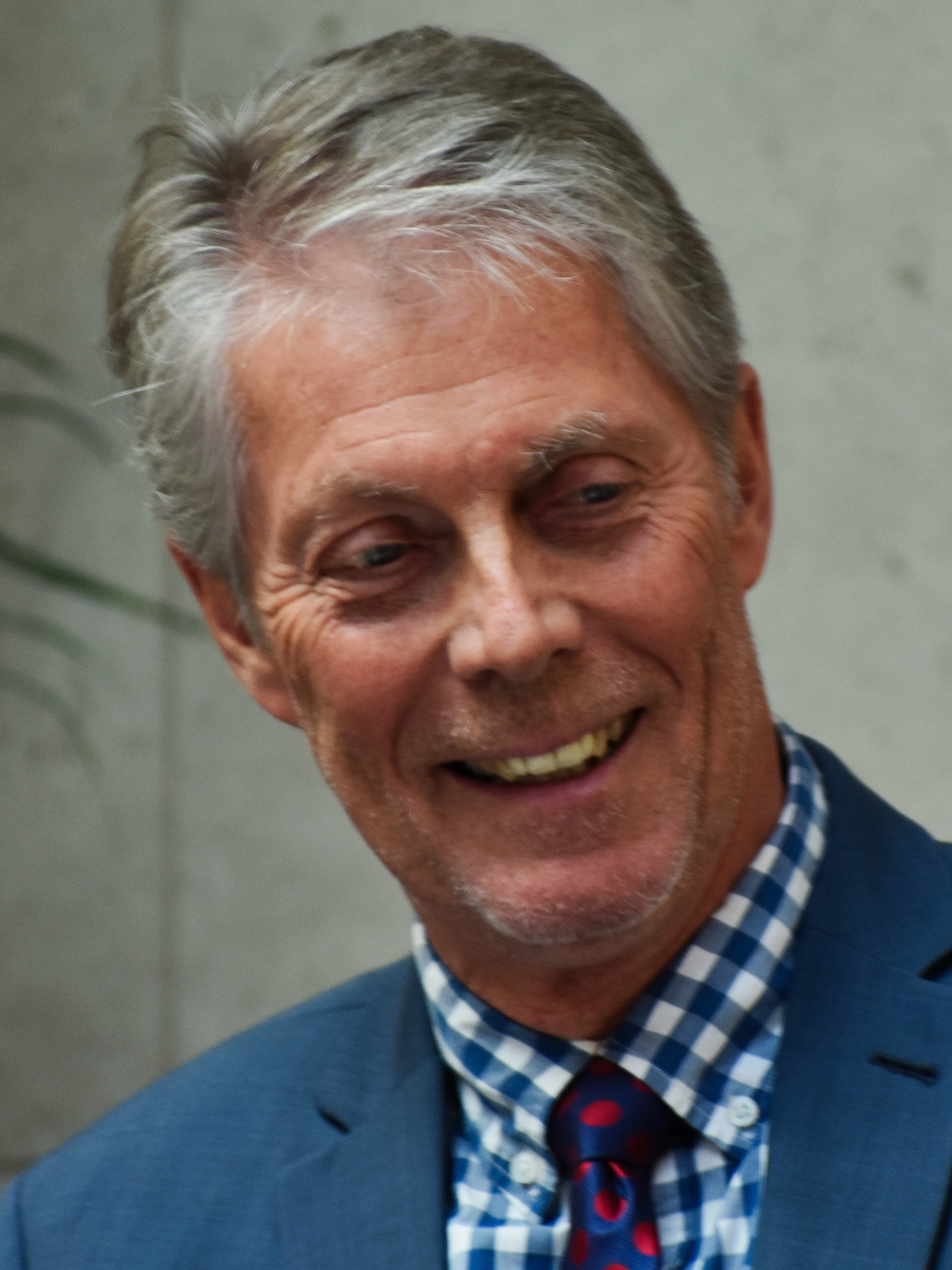
- Eisenberger in 2017

55th and 57th Mayor of Hamilton
- In office December 3, 2014 – November 15, 2022
- Preceded by: Bob Bratina
- Succeeded by: Andrea Horwath
- In office December 1, 2006 – December 1, 2010
- Preceded by: Larry Di Ianni
- Succeeded by: Bob Bratina

Personal details
- Born: September 3, 1952 (age 74) Amsterdam, Netherlands
- Party: Independent
- Other political affiliations: Conservative (2004–2004)
- Spouse: Diane Girouard (m. 1979)
- Children: Brett Eisenberger; Alida Eisenberger
- Education: Mohawk College; University of Waterloo; McMaster University
- Profession: Politician
- Website: Mayor's Office

Fred Eisenberger (born September 3, 1952) is a Canadian politician and former real estate agent who was the 57th mayor of Hamilton from 2014 to 2022. Eisenberger previously served as chair of the Hamilton Port Authority prior to his first election. He served as the 55th mayor from 2006 to 2010, and was succeeded by Bob Bratina, but was elected mayor again in 2014 and 2018 to four-year terms.

== Early life and background ==
Born in Amsterdam, Netherlands, Eisenberger emigrated with his family to Canada when he was eight years old, entering through the iconic LIUNA Station as many immigrants did during that era. He attended Sir Winston Churchill School in Hamilton. He graduated with honours from Mohawk College. He has also taken courses at the University of Waterloo and McMaster University.

Eisenberger spent three terms as one of two aldermen in Ward 5 from 1991 to 2000. He ran unsuccessfully for mayor in 2000, placing third behind Robert E. Wade and Bob Morrow.

He registered, but withdrew from the 2003 mayoral election, due to a ruled conflict of interest by the federal ethics counsellor stemming from the fact that Eisenberger was serving as chair of the Hamilton Port Authority. Faced with the choice of resignation from the board or candidacy in the election, he chose to withdraw from the race.

In the 2004 federal election, Eisenberger ran for the Conservative Party in Hamilton East—Stoney Creek, finishing third behind Liberal Tony Valeri and New Democrat Tony DePaulo.

== Mayoral career ==
=== 2006 mayoral election ===
During the campaign, Eisenberger stated that elected officials should be limited from serving more than two consecutive terms of office without a one-term break. One of the key planks of his platform was a proposal to hire an independent integrity officer to help restore public trust in city hall, following the controversy around Larry Di Ianni's campaign contributions in 2003. While local media referred often to Eisenberger's 2006 win by 452 votes, few in the media managed to observe that ex-mayor Larry Di Ianni's vote had sharply dropped by 17,000 from 2003—a highly significant factor—from 70,539 to 53,658 votes.

Eisenberger also refused donations from corporations and unions and was outspent four to one by his main opponent (Di Ianni). The local daily paper supported the incumbent but Eisenberger won the election. It came to light that the incumbent (Di Ianni) had accepted illegal donations in the 2003 campaign in which Eisenberger was not a candidate for mayor. Di Ianni was convicted of that offence. Eisenberger won the subsequent 2006 mayoral election as voters valued the campaign funding stance he'd taken, according to reports of the campaign.

=== Economic development ===
As part of his campaign, Eisenberger wanted to reform economic development in Hamilton, including a boost to the department's budget. He sought and won support for this initiative which involved hiring new staff and developing a marketing campaign to help promote Hamilton.

Another major initiative was the creation of the Jobs Prosperity Collaborative, a group of community leaders to help steer Hamilton's economic development. He also proposed that the federal government's newly announced Southern Ontario Development Agency be located in Hamilton.

=== Environment and sustainable development ===
Eisenberger has proposed a downtown pedestrian plaza to increase pedestrian activity in the core of Hamilton.

He also gained the endorsement of colleagues to implement an anti-idling by-law; A by-law which was ineffective in the form which Eisenberger proposed it, relying on citizens calling the by-law office about a vehicle idling longer than 15 minutes. Reforms to the by-law in subsequent years have not improved its efficacy, with only two charges being laid out of 330 calls between 2015 and 2020.

After several years of debate, Eisenberger worked with both the provincial and federal governments to gather financial support ($60 million in total) to assist with efforts to clean up Randle Reef in Hamilton Harbour, a toxic hotspot from the city's industrial past. The provincial and federal government each contributed their portion of funding. Additionally, the City of Hamilton continues to work with the Region of Halton, the City of Burlington, the Hamilton Port Authority and the private sector (including US Steel and Arcelor Mittal) to create a funding formula to cover the remaining one-third of the cleanup costs. To date, the city has pledged $7 million to $10 million toward the cost of the cleanup.

=== Public transit ===
Eisenberger was a founding board member for the provincial transportation agency, the Greater Toronto Transit Authority (GTTA) which later became Metrolinx. He is a leading proponent for the Hamilton LRT, a light rail transit (LRT) project. As part of Metrolinx, Eisenberger helped to initiate service improvements to the city's two rapid transit corridors, the north-south A-Line and the east-west B-Line, and was a key force in the establishment of the West Harbour GO Transit rail station on James Street North that was meant to boost inter-regional connections between Hamilton, the Greater Toronto Area and the Niagara Region

The Province of Ontario established a new Metrolinx Board of Directors in 2009 at which time Eisenberger and all elected representatives, were removed from the board.

=== Ethics and integrity ===
Since winning the 2006 election, Eisenberger has pursued policies that he describes as "bringing ethics and integrity back to Hamilton council". In January 2008, Eisenberger publicly criticised councillors who he felt were trying to derail his 2006 campaign promise to bring in an integrity commissioner, but city council voted to implement an integrity commissioner in June 2008.

In July 2008, a leaked tape of a private conversation between Eisenberger and Hamilton Spectator columnist Andrew Dreschel was released to Hamilton Community News, although Eisenberger had previously admonished other council members for leaking info to the media. During his tenure, Eisenberger has allowed many of his councillors to walk away unscathed from clear violations of the city's code of conduct. In September 2008, council cleared him of any wrongdoing, and an investigator found that he had been acting in the public interest and that his motives were "wholly proper" and in a manner consistent with the Mayor's duties under Section 226.1 of the Municipal Act, 2001, though technically violating the code of conduct.

=== Stadium controversy ===
Eisenberger and a majority of councillors became engaged in a controversy over the location of a stadium for the Pan Am Games which were held in Southern Ontario. Together with his Council colleagues, Eisenberger had voted in favor of a stadium to be located at the West Harbour. However, the main tenant, the Hamilton Tiger-Cats, disagreed with Council's preferred location choice. Eisenberger's refusal to negotiate is mainly the reason for his third-place loss in his upcoming election. The controversy, which lasted through the 2010 Municipal Election and beyond, proved a fruitless effort by both the Tiger-Cats and the city. A stadium location would not be worked out between the City and the Tiger-Cats organization until an 11th hour compromise to demolish the existing stadium and build the new stadium on the same site, a compromise negotiated by Bob Bratina.

== Electoral record ==
Candidates for the October 22, 2018 Hamilton Mayoral Election
Candidate	Popular vote			Expenditures
Candidate	Votes	%	±%	Expenditures
Fred Eisenberger (Incumbent)	74,093	54.03%	+14.1%	$114,534.00
Vito Sgro	52,190	38.06%	n/a	$228,890.71
George Rusich	2,220	1.62%	n/a	$8,692.00
Jim Davis	2,071	1.51%	n/a	$1,000.00
Nathalie Xian Yi Yan	1,286	0.94%	n/a	-^{1}
Michael Pattison	899	0.66%	+0.04	$2,282.60
Paul Fromm	706	0.51%	n/a	$7,189.16
Carlos Gomes	521	0.38%	n/a	$0.00
Todd May	500	0.36%	n/a	$0.00
Henry Geissler	494	0.36%	n/a	$1,178.53
Phil Ryerson	479	0.35%	+0.13%	-^{1}
Ute Schmid-Jones	463	0.34%	n/a	$3,016.28
Edward Graydon	409	0.30%	n/a	-^{1}
Mark Wozny	408	0.30%	n/a	$0.00
Ricky Tavares	398	0.29%	-0.06%	$0.00
Total votes	138,549	38.36%	+4.3%	
Registered voters	361,212	100%	n/a	
^{1} These candidates did not submit official Financial Statements and are, therefore, ineligible to run in the 2022 Municipal election Note: All Hamilton Municipal Elections are officially non-partisan. Note: Candidate campaign colours are based on the prominent colour used in campaign items (signs, literature, etc.) and are used as a visual differentiation between candidates.
Sources: City of Hamilton, "Nominated Candidates"

Candidates for the October 27, 2014 Hamilton Mayoral Election
Candidate	Popular vote			Expenditures
Candidate	Votes	%	±%	Expenditures
Fred Eisenberger	49,020	39.93%	+12.5%	$106,647.00
Brad Clark	38,706	31.53%	-	$152,236.05
Brian McHattie	25,020	20.38%	-	$129,341.11
Michael Baldasaro	3,518	2.87%	+0.82%	$0
Crystal Lavigne	1,910	1.56%	-	$0
Ejaz Butt	1,579	1.29%	-	n/a^{1}
Mike Clancy	821	0.67%	-	$309.19
Michael A. Pattison	763	0.62%	-	$1,095.12
Nick Iamonico	444	0.36%	-	n/a^{1}
Ricky Tavares	428	0.35%	-	$0
Warrand Francis	278	0.23%	-	n/a^{1}
Phil Ryerson	269	0.22%	-	$0
Total votes	122,756	33.53%	-6.92%	
Registered voters	366,124	100%	n/a	
^{1} These candidates did not submit official Financial Statements and were ineligible to run in the 2018 Municipal election Note: All Hamilton Municipal Elections are officially non-partisan. Note: Candidate campaign colours are based on the prominent colour used in campaign items (signs, literature, etc.) and are used as a visual differentiation between candidates.
Sources: City of Hamilton, "Nominated Candidates" Archived August 20, 2010, at the Wayback Machine

Summary of the October 25, 2010 Hamilton Mayoral Election
Candidate	Popular vote		
Candidate	Votes	%	±%
Bob Bratina	52,684	37.32%	n/a
Larry Di Ianni	40,091	28.40%	-14.44%
Fred Eisenberger (incumbent)	38,719	27.43%	-15.78%
Michael Baldasaro	2,892	2.05%	-1.56%
Tone Marrone	1,052	0.75%	n/a
Mahesh Butani	950	0.67%	n/a
Glenn Hamilton	949	0.67%	n/a
Pasquale (Pat) Filice	768	0.54%	n/a
Ken Leach	577	0.41%	n/a
Andrew Haines	557	0.39%	n/a
Mark Wozny	433	0.31%	n/a
Steven Waxman	429	0.30%	n/a
Edward Graydon	404	0.29%	n/a
Gino Speziale	356	0.25%	-0.77%
Victor Veri	313	0.22%	n/a
Total votes	141,174	100%	
Registered voters	353,317	40.45%	+3.2%
Note: All Hamilton Municipal Elections are officially non-partisan. Note: Candidate campaign colours are based on the prominent colour used in campaign items (signs, literature, etc.) and are used as a visual differentiation between candidates.
Sources: Hamilton, Ontario, City Clerk's Office

Summary of the November 13, 2006 Hamilton Mayoral Election
Candidate	Popular vote		
Candidate	Votes	%	±%
Fred Eisenberger	54,110	43.21%	n/a
Larry Di Ianni (Incumbent)	53,658	42.84%	−8.08%
Diane Elms	9,459	7.55%	n/a
Michael Baldasaro	4,520	3.61%	+1.76%
Gino Speziale	1,274	1.02	n/a
Steve Leach	1,250	1.00	n/a
Martin S. Zuliniak	968	0.77	n/a
Total votes	126,986	100%	
Registered voters	340,941	37.25%	−0.72%
Note: All Hamilton Municipal Elections are officially non-partisan. Note: Candidate campaign colours are based on the prominent colour used in campaign items (signs, literature, etc.) and are used as a visual differentiation between candidates.
Sources: Hamilton, Ontario, City Clerk's Office Archived August 20, 2010, at the Wayback Machine

Hamilton East—Stoney Creek - 2004 Canadian federal election
Party	Candidate	Votes	%	±%
Liberal	Tony Valeri	18,417	37.7%	
New Democratic	Tony DePaulo	17,490	35.8%	
Conservative	Fred Eisenberger	10,888	22.3%	
Green	Richard Safka	1,446	3.0%	
Independent	Sam Cino	393	0.8%	
Communist	Bob Mann	166	0.3%	

Summary of the November 13, 2000 Hamilton Mayoral Election
Candidate	Popular vote		
Candidate	Votes	%	±%
Robert Wade	62,945	42.27%	n/a
Bob Morrow (Incumbent)	51,225	34.40%	-41.60%
Fred Eisenberger	15,112	10.15%	n/a
John C. Munro	14,090	9.46%	n/a
Michael Baldasaro	1,637	1.1%	n/a
Bill Cottrell Jr.	1,358	0.91%	n/a
Julie Gordon	1,041	0.69%	n/a
C. A. Smith	394	0.26%	n/a
Bob Fanjoy	392	0.26%	n/a
Kris Heaton	290	0.20%	n/a
Richard H. Hennick	218	0.14%	n/a
Fern Rankin	196	0.13%	n/a
Total votes	148,898	100%	
Registered voters	n/a	n/a	n/a
Note: All Hamilton Municipal Elections are officially non-partisan. Note: Candidate campaign colours are based on the prominent colour used in campaign items (signs, literature, etc.) and are used as a visual differentiation between candidates.
Sources: Van Harten, Peter. "A feisty Munro has crash landing; Former Liberal cabinet member finishes fourth," The Hamilton Spectator, November 14, 2000, Decision 2000, D01.

Candidates for the November 10, 1997 Hamilton Ward 5 Councillor Election
Candidate	Popular vote		
Candidate	Votes	%	±%
Chad Collins	5,347		-
Fred Eisenberger (incumbent)	4,546		-
Rita Chimienti	2,866		-
Rocco Restauri	2,192		-
Margaret Cunningham	1,828		-
Total votes			
Registered voters			
Note: All Hamilton Municipal Elections are officially non-partisan. Note: Candidate campaign colours are based on the prominent colour used in campaign items (signs, literature, etc.) and are used as a visual differentiation between candidates.

Summary of the November 14, 1994 Hamilton Ward Five Alderman Election
Candidate	Popular vote		
Candidate	Votes	%	±%
Dominic Agostino (incumbent)	7,804	70.43%	+8.03%
Fred Eisenberger (incumbent)	4,803	43.35%	+17.5%
Chad Collins	3,661	33.04%	n/a
Total votes	11,080	Note 1	
Registered voters	28,265	39.2%	-3.67%
Note 1: Each ward elected two aldermen and percentages are specific to each candidate, not for the overall total. Note 2: All Hamilton Municipal Elections are officially non-partisan. Note 3: Candidate campaign colours are based on the prominent colour used in campaign items (signs, literature, etc.) and are used as a visual differentiation between candidates.
Sources: Wells, Jon. "Ward 5: A silence over the valley", The Hamilton Spectator, November 7, 1997, Election Review, S11.

Summary of the November 12, 1991 Hamilton Ward Five Alderman Election
Candidate	Popular vote		
Candidate	Votes	%	±%
Dominic Agostino (Incumbent)	7,697	62.35%	+1.46%
Fred Eisenberger	3,191	25.85%	n/a
Reg Wheeler	3,159	25.59%	n/a
Fred Lombardo (Incumbent)	2,984	24.17%	-8.56%
Tommy Tarpos	2,178	17.64%	n/a
Fiore Manganiello	347	2.81%	n/a
Total votes	12,344	Note 1	
Registered voters	n/a	n/a	n/a
Note 1: Each ward elected two aldermen and percentages are specific to each candidate, not for the overall total. Note 2: All Hamilton Municipal Elections are officially non-partisan. Note 3: Candidate campaign colours are based on the prominent colour used in campaign items (signs, literature, etc.) and are used as a visual differentiation between candidates.
Sources: Elliot, James. "Newcomer Eisenberger wins squeaker", Hamilton Spectator, Wednesday, November 13, 1991, Metro, B2.

== See also ==
- List of University of Waterloo people
