= 1997 Hamilton, Ontario, municipal election =

Canadian municipal election

1997 Hamilton municipal election
- November 10, 1997
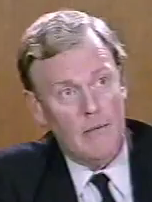

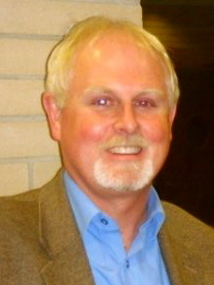
		DS
Candidate	Bob Morrow	Dave Snowdon
Popular vote	58,414	4,996
Percentage	75.11%	6.41%
	KH
Candidate	Kristina Heaton	Brian McHattie
Popular vote	4,642	4,254
Percentage	5.98%	5.46%
Mayor before election
Bob Morrow
Elected mayor
Bob Morrow

The 1997 Hamilton municipal election was held on November 10, 1997, to elect municipal officials for the City of Hamilton. Hamiltonions selected one mayor, one regional chairperson, and seventeen members of the Hamilton City Council, who were elected on a two-tier basis, as well as members of both the English and French Public and Catholic School Boards. The suburban communities of Ancaster, Flambrough, Glanbrook, Dundas and Stoney Creek, each elected town councils for the last time before amalgamation.

Voter turnout remained steady in 1997, amidst events such as Premier Mike Harris' Common Sense Revolution service cuts, the Plastimet Fire, and plebiscites on smoking by-laws and a proposed casino.

== New measures ==
For the 1997 election, the City of Hamilton switched from paper ballots to a new automated voting system. This system saw voters mark their choices on a paper ballot, enclose it in a 'privacy sleeve' and feed it into a computer that automatically tabulated the results.

== Referendums ==
Referendum questions in the November 10, 1997 municipal election
Hamilton, Ontario, Municipal referendums, 1997
Question	Yes		No		Voter turnout	
Question	Votes	%	Votes	%	Votes	%
Smoking Control Bylaw - Banning smoking in restaurants and bars	50,817	66.89%	25,156	33.11%	75,973	
Provincial Casino - Approval to build a casino in Hamilton	28275	36.97%	48,211	63.03%	76,486	
Total voters						
Note: Vote totals for each question were different as voters did not need to vote on each question.

== Mayoral election ==
=== Official candidates ===
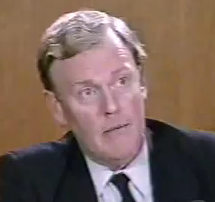
Incumbent Mayor Bob Morrow

Civil servant Dave Snowdon

Fitness instructor Kristina Heaton

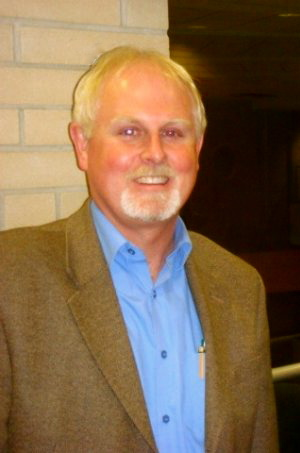
Environmentalist Brian McHattie

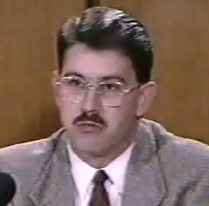
Automotive manager Paul Decker

Student Waylon MacDonald

Anti-poverty activist Wendel Fields
- Incumbent Mayor Bob Morrow sought, and won, a sixth term in 1997. His campaign was centered around the establishment of a one-tier 'megacity', and the lowering of downtown taxes.
- Civil Servant Dave Snowdon was an employee of Human Resources Development Canada and called the east Mountain home. The 31-year-old father of two focused on making the city a more inclusive community, especially in respects to youth, increased investment in the downtown core and promoted environmentally responsible issues.
- Fitness instructor Kristina Heaton was the first female contender for the position since 1978, and campaigned on uniting environmental groups across the city, establishing a monitoring system to investigate cases of animal abuse and increasing police foot-patrols in the downtown core.
- Future city councillor Brian McHattie ran on an environmentally conscious platform that promoted practical spending, and supported an inquiry into the Plastimet disaster, improving municipal air quality and upgrading the city's sewer system.
- Paul Decker was the automotive manager of a Canadian Tire store in Dundas, and ran in the 1994 Election, finishing second to Mayor Morrow. Though known in his community for his volunteer work and commitment to municipal affairs, he was arrested a year after the 1997 election on charges of defrauding his employer for under $1,500.
- College student Waylon MacDonald, who was training to be a machinist at the time of the election, advocated a reversal of the downtown conversion to one-way streets and focused on reducing the debt.
- An unemployed moulder in 1997, Wendel Fields, who was also a former candidate for the Marxist-Leninist Party of Canada in the riding of Hamilton West in 1997, promoted the idea of establishing 'people's councils' to ensure Hamiltonians had a say in the direction of their tax-dollars, as well as lowering taxes for small businesses, while raising them for large corporations.

=== Results ===
Summary of the November 10, 1997 Hamilton, Ontario, mayoral election
Candidate	Popular vote		
Candidate	Votes	%	±%
Bob Morrow (incumbent)	58,486	75.11%	-12.11%
Dave Snowdon	4,998	6.41%	n/a
Kristina Heaton	4,647	5.98%	n/a
Brian McHattie	4,255	5.46%	n/a
Paul Decker	3,468	4.45%	-0.06%
Waylon MacDonald	1,407	1,81%	n/a
Wendell Fields	611	0.78%	n/a
Total votes	77,872	100%	
Registered voters	n/a	n/a	n/a
Note: All Hamilton municipal elections are officially non-partisan. Note: Candidate campaign colours are based on the prominent colour used in campaign items (signs, literature, etc.) and are used as a visual differentiation between candidates.

== City council election ==
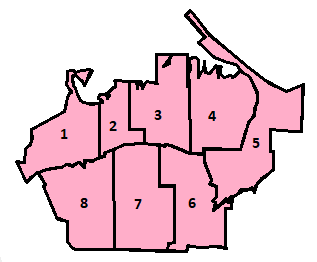
Ward map used in this election

=== Ward 1 ===
Candidates for the November 10, 1997 Hamilton, Ontario Ward 1 councillor election
Candidate	Popular vote		
Candidate	Votes	%	±%
Mary Kiss (incumbent)	4,560	29.2%	
Marvin Caplan (incumbent)	4,125	26.4%	
Cam Nolan	3,848	25%	-
Sarah Whatmough	3,059	19.4%	-
Total votes	15,589		
Registered voters			
Note: All Hamilton municipal elections are officially non-partisan. Note: Candidate campaign colours are based on the prominent colour used in campaign items (signs, literature, etc.) and are used as a visual differentiation between candidates.
Sources:

- Mary Kiss successfully ran for a sixth term in 1997, promoting her personal record of constituency work and environmental advocacy, as well as highlighting the very small tax increases that have occurred during her tenure on council.
- Incumbent Marvin Caplan made a successful bid for a second term as Ward One's junior councillor in 1997, promoting his advocacy on downtown issues and promoting social justice.
- Second-time candidate Cam Nolan was the executive director of the Hamilton Construction Association at the time and ran on a fiscal responsibility and anti-incumbency platform.
- Newcomer Sarah Whatmough, owner of multiple gas stations across the city, campaigned against bureaucratic red tape and promoted direct democracy in dealing with municipal issues. As Sarah Thomson, she would later run for mayor of Toronto in 2010 and was a Liberal candidate in the 2011 Ontario election.

=== Ward 2 ===
Candidates for the November 10, 1997 Hamilton, Ontario Ward 2 councillor election
Candidate	Popular vote		
Candidate	Votes	%	±%
Andrea Horwath	3,587	28.1%	
Ron Corsini	3,364	26.4%	
Vince Agro (incumbent)	3,346	44.5%	±0%
Bill McCulloch (incumbent)	2,605	34.63%	+0.9%
Jason Capobianco	902	7.1%	-
John Kenyon	512	4%	-
Jim Savage	208	1.6%	-
Total votes	12,767		
Registered voters			
Note: All Hamilton municipal elections are officially non-partisan. Note: Candidate campaign colours are based on the prominent colour used in campaign items (signs, literature, etc.) and are used as a visual differentiation between candidates.
Sources:

- Andrea Horwath, 35 years old at the time, was a community organizer, and campaigned on a platform of bringing change to City Council after nearly three decades of the same representation for Ward Two.
- Rob Corsini was the owner of Corsini Supermarkets and a member of the Ontario Liberal Party, who campaigned on restoring the economic health of the downtown core following the Plastimet fire, an industrial disaster that affected the northern portion of the ward, assisted heavily by Hamilton West MP Stan Keyes.
- Vince Agro, a councillor of 25 years, campaigned on the importance of dealing with the coming provincial downloading on a case-by-case basis, as well as highlighting his experience.
- A councillor for 31 years, Bill McCulloch ran solely on his experience, maintaining that proven leadership was the most effective way to run a city. He caused some controversy by writing off Horwath and Corsini's candidacies, saying, "Let me suggest we need one person with experience. If all of a sudden we were to get rid of everyone with experience, the new people wouldn't know where the washroom is!"
- 26-year-old financial planner Jason Capobianco ran against amalgamation and provincial downloading, saying he would refuse to accept any provincial proposal to change the status quo.
- John Kenyon was manager of the Payne Music House on King Street East and campaigned on bringing change and new ideas to the table, as well as lowering business taxes in the core.
- Jim Savage, who was associated with the Corktown Community Association, ran on a reformist platform, calling for a new perspective in city politics and a reduction in business taxes.

=== Ward 3 ===
Candidates for the November 10, 1997 Hamilton, Ontario Ward 3 councillor election
Candidate	Popular vote		
Candidate	Votes	%	±%
Bernie Morelli (incumbent)	4,229		-
Dennis Haining	1,989		-
Sam Merulla	1,728		-
Elena Lazar	1,372		-
Bob Stewart	985		-
Joyce Rattray	917		-
Dwain Burns	536		-
Kattie Calleja	496		-
Melvin Boudreau	213		-
Total votes			
Registered voters			
Note: All Hamilton municipal elections are officially non-partisan. Note: Candidate campaign colours are based on the prominent colour used in campaign items (signs, literature, etc.) and are used as a visual differentiation between candidates.

=== Ward 4 ===
Candidates for the November 10, 1997 Hamilton, Ontario Ward 4 councillor election
Candidate	Popular vote		
Candidate	Votes	%	±%
Dave Wilson (incumbent)	4,892		-
Geraldine Copps (incumbent)	3,659		-
Murray Kilgour	2,720		-
Total votes			
Registered voters			
Note: All Hamilton municipal elections are officially non-partisan. Note: Candidate campaign colours are based on the prominent colour used in campaign items (signs, literature, etc.) and are used as a visual differentiation between candidates.

=== Ward 5 ===
Candidates for the November 10, 1997 Hamilton, Ontario Ward 5 councillor election
Candidate	Popular vote		
Candidate	Votes	%	±%
Chad Collins	5,347		-
Fred Eisenberger (incumbent)	4,546		-
Rita Chimienti	2,866		-
Rocco Restauri	2,192		-
Margaret Cunningham	1,828		-
Total votes			
Registered voters			
Note: All Hamilton municipal elections are officially non-partisan. Note: Candidate campaign colours are based on the prominent colour used in campaign items (signs, literature, etc.) and are used as a visual differentiation between candidates.

=== Ward 6 ===
Candidates for the November 10, 1997 Hamilton, Ontario Ward 6 councillor election
Candidate	Popular vote		
Candidate	Votes	%	±%
Tom Jackson (incumbent)	7,938		-
Bob Charters (incumbent)	6,093		-
Paul Lewis Settimi	4958		-
Charles Eleveld	1,789		-
Total votes			
Registered voters			
Note: All Hamilton municipal elections are officially non-partisan. Note: Candidate campaign colours are based on the prominent colour used in campaign items (signs, literature, etc.) and are used as a visual differentiation between candidates.

=== Ward 7 ===
Candidates for the November 10, 1997 Hamilton, Ontario Ward 7 councillor election
Candidate	Popular vote		
Candidate	Votes	%	±%
Terry Anderson (incumbent)	8,721		-
Bill Kelly	8,112		-
Henry Merling (incumbent)	6,040		-
Mark Whittle	1,203		-
Eduardo Navarro	1,182		-
Total votes			
Registered voters			
Note: All Hamilton municipal elections are officially non-partisan. Note: Candidate campaign colours are based on the prominent colour used in campaign items (signs, literature, etc.) and are used as a visual differentiation between candidates.

=== Ward 8 ===
Candidates for the November 10, 1997 Hamilton, Ontario Ward 8 councillor election
Candidate	Popular vote		
Candidate	Votes	%	±%
Frank D'Amico (incumbent)	8,400		-
Duke O'Sullivan	6,155		-
Tom Murray	3,463		-
Mike Oddi	2,230		-
Judith Preston	1,904		-
Tony Di Prospero	749		-
Chris Kiriakopoulos	696		-
Vish Bagal	632		-
Total votes			
Registered voters			
Note: All Hamilton municipal elections are officially non-partisan. Note: Candidate campaign colours are based on the prominent colour used in campaign items (signs, literature, etc.) and are used as a visual differentiation between candidates.

== Public school trustee elections ==
Candidates for the November 10, 1997 Hamilton-Wentworth District School Board Wards 1 and 2 trustee election
Candidate	Popular vote		
Candidate	Votes	%	±%
Judith Bishop (incumbent)	8,042		-
John Tickle	2,278		-
Total votes			
Registered voters			
Note: All Hamilton municipal elections are officially non-partisan. Note: Candidate campaign colours are based on the prominent colour used in campaign items (signs, literature, etc.) and are used as a visual differentiation between candidates.

Candidates for the November 10, 1997 Hamilton-Wentworth District School Board Ward 3 trustee election
Candidate	Popular vote		
Candidate	Votes	%	±%
Eleanor Johnstone	1,595		-
Robert Barlow	1,056		-
Julie Gordon	703		-
Neville Nunes	532		-
Total votes			
Registered voters			
Note: All Hamilton municipal elections are officially non-partisan. Note: Candidate campaign colours are based on the prominent colour used in campaign items (signs, literature, etc.) and are used as a visual differentiation between candidates.

Candidates for the November 10, 1997 Hamilton-Wentworth District School Board Ward 4 trustee election
Candidate	Popular vote			Expenditures
Candidate	Votes	%	±%	Expenditures
Ray E. Mulholland (incumbent)	Acclaimed			
Total votes				
Registered voters				
Note: All Hamilton municipal elections are officially non-partisan. Note: Candidate campaign colours are based on the prominent colour used in campaign items (signs, literature, etc.) and are used as a visual differentiation between candidates.

Incumbent Ward 5 trustee, Reverend Joe Rogers, sought re-election in 1997. First elected in 1968, Rogers was the executive director of St. Matthew's House and an Anglican priest in area churches. Mark Davies, the former executive director of the Mental Health Rights Coalition of Hamilton-Wentworth and independent candidate in Wentworth East in the 1995 Ontario provincial election, had initially filed to contest the seat, but withdrew before the close of nominations.

Candidates for the November 10, 1997 Hamilton-Wentworth District School Board Ward 5 trustee election
Candidate
Candidate	Votes	%	±%
Joe Rogers (incumbent)	Acclaimed		
Total votes			
Registered voters			
Note: All Hamilton municipal elections are officially non-partisan. Note: Candidate campaign colours are based on the prominent colour used in campaign items (signs, literature, etc.) and are used as a visual differentiation between candidates.

Candidates for the November 10, 1997 Hamilton-Wentworth District School Board Ward 6 trustee election
Candidate
Candidate	Votes	%	±%
Laura Peddle	2,954		-
Janice Wall	2,204		-
Marla Robinson	1,783		-
Total votes			
Registered voters			
Note: All Hamilton municipal elections are officially non-partisan. Note: Candidate campaign colours are based on the prominent colour used in campaign items (signs, literature, etc.) and are used as a visual differentiation between candidates.

Candidates for the November 10, 1997 Hamilton-Wentworth District School Board Ward 7 trustee election
Candidate	Popular vote=		
Candidate	Votes	%	±%
Lillian Orban (incumbent)	Acclaimed		
Total votes			
Registered voters			
Note: All Hamilton municipal elections are officially non-partisan. Note: Candidate campaign colours are based on the prominent colour used in campaign items (signs, literature, etc.) and are used as a visual differentiation between candidates.

Candidates for the November 10, 1997 Hamilton-Wentworth District School Board Ward 8 trustee election
Candidate	Popular vote		
Candidate	Votes	%	±%
Wes Hicks (incumbent)	Acclaimed		
Total votes			
Registered voters			
Note: All Hamilton municipal elections are officially non-partisan. Note: Candidate campaign colours are based on the prominent colour used in campaign items (signs, literature, etc.) and are used as a visual differentiation between candidates.

== Catholic school trustee elections ==
Candidates for the November 10, 1997 Hamilton-Wentworth Catholic District School Board Wards 1 and 2 trustee election
Candidate	Popular vote		
Candidate	Votes	%	±%
Leo Blain	1,783		-
William Laidlaw	1,596		-
Total votes			
Registered voters			
Note: All Hamilton municipal elections are officially non-partisan. Note: Candidate campaign colours are based on the prominent colour used in campaign items (signs, literature, etc.) and are used as a visual differentiation between candidates.

Candidates for the November 10, 1997 Hamilton-Wentworth Catholic District School Board Wards 3 and 4 trustee election
Candidate	Popular vote		
Candidate	Votes	%	±%
Ralph Agostino	2,515		-
Danuta Bortolussi	1,842		-
Total votes			
Registered voters			
Note: All Hamilton municipal elections are officially non-partisan. Note: Candidate campaign colours are based on the prominent colour used in campaign items (signs, literature, etc.) and are used as a visual differentiation between candidates.

Candidates for the November 10, 1997 Hamilton-Wentworth Catholic District School Board Ward 5 trustee election
Candidate	Popular vote		
Candidate	Votes	%	±%
Rose Agostino	1,915		-
Joseph Spatazzo	1,856		-
Benedicta Egbo	382		-
Total votes			
Registered voters			
Note: All Hamilton municipal elections are officially non-partisan. Note: Candidate campaign colours are based on the prominent colour used in campaign items (signs, literature, etc.) and are used as a visual differentiation between candidates.

Candidates for the November 10, 1997 Hamilton-Wentworth Catholic District School Board Ward 6 trustee election
Candidate	Popular vote		
Candidate	Votes	%	±%
Kyran Kennedy	2,191		-
Joseph Baiardo	1,779		-
Total votes			
Registered voters			
Note: All Hamilton municipal elections are officially non-partisan. Note: Candidate campaign colours are based on the prominent colour used in campaign items (signs, literature, etc.) and are used as a visual differentiation between candidates.

Candidates for the November 10, 1997 Hamilton-Wentworth Catholic District School Board Ward 7 trustee election
Candidate	Popular vote		
Candidate	Votes	%	±%
Pat Daly (incumbent)	Acclaimed		
Total votes			
Registered voters			
Note: All Hamilton municipal elections are officially non-partisan. Note: Candidate campaign colours are based on the prominent colour used in campaign items (signs, literature, etc.) and are used as a visual differentiation between candidates.

Candidates for the November 10, 1997 Hamilton-Wentworth Catholic District School Board Ward 8 trustee election
Candidate	Popular vote		
Candidate	Votes	%	±%
Tom Gallagher	2,595		-
Michelle Rizzato	1,554		-
Phil Consalvo	462		-
Total votes	12,767		
Registered voters			
Note: All Hamilton municipal elections are officially non-partisan. Note: Candidate campaign colours are based on the prominent colour used in campaign items (signs, literature, etc.) and are used as a visual differentiation between candidates.

== French public school trustee election ==
Candidates for the November 10, 1997 Conseil scolaire Viamonde French public school trustee election
Candidate	Popular vote		
Candidate	Votes	%	±%
Jean Desmarais	87		-
Agnes Gizard	56		-
Total votes			
Registered voters			
Note: All Hamilton municipal elections are officially non-partisan. Note: Candidate campaign colours are based on the prominent colour used in campaign items (signs, literature, etc.) and are used as a visual differentiation between candidates.

== French Catholic school trustee election ==
Candidates for the November 10, 1997 Conseil Scolaire Catholique MonAvenir French public school trustee election
Candidate	Popular vote		
Candidate	Votes	%	±%
Marcel Levesque	363		-
Pascale Harster	229		-
Total votes			
Registered voters			
Note: All Hamilton municipal elections are officially non-partisan. Note: Candidate campaign colours are based on the prominent colour used in campaign items (signs, literature, etc.) and are used as a visual differentiation between candidates.

== Suburban town council elections ==
=== Ancaster ===
Candidate	Votes	%
Ancaster mayor
Bob Wade (incumbent)	acclaimed	

- Despite being acclaimed, Wade fought provincial downloading and grappled with Ancaster's new commercial development, the Meadowlands Power Centre.

Candidate	Votes	%
Ancaster deputy-mayor
Ann Sloat (incumbent)	3,218	57%
Phil Winer	2,467	43%
Total valid votes	5,685	100.00

Candidate	Votes	%
Ancaster Ward One councillor
Murray Ferguson (incumbent)	acclaimed	

Candidate	Votes	%
Ancaster Ward Two councillor
Barry Kent	622	64%
Scott McCallum	355	36%
Total valid votes	977	100.00

Candidate	Votes	%
Ancaster Ward Three councillor
Brad Khun (incumbent)	acclaimed	

Candidate	Votes	%
Ancaster Ward Four councillor
Bryan Kerman (incumbent)	793	51%
Larry Weber	773	49%
Total valid votes	1566	100.00

Candidate	Votes	%
Ancaster Ward Five councillor
Luanne Robertson (incumbent)	acclaimed	

Candidate	Votes	%
Ancaster Catholic School Board trustee
Carolyn Cornale (incumbent)	1,275	53%
Philomena Newberry	1,114	437%
Total valid votes	2,389	100.00

Candidate	Votes	%
Ancaster Public School Board trustee
Bruce Wallace (incumbent)	acclaimed	

== See also ==
- List of Hamilton, Ontario, municipal elections
