= William Powell (Canadian politician) =

Mayor of Hamilton, Canada

Mayor of Hamilton, Ontario
- In office 1980–1982
- Preceded by: Jack MacDonald
- Succeeded by: Bob Morrow

Personal details
- Born: 1907 St. Helen's, Lancashire, England
- Died: July 20, 1992 (aged 84–85) Hamilton, Ontario, Canada
- Party: Independent
- Spouse: Rose Gath

William Powell (1907–1992) was Mayor of Hamilton, Canada, from 1981 to 1982.

Born in St. Helen's, Lancashire, England, his family emigrated to Canada in 1911. While his family returned to England, Powell came to Hamilton in 1921, and eventually found work at Stelco, a steel company based in Hamilton.

In 1958, he ran as the Co-operative Commonwealth Federation candidate in Hamilton East. He placed third with 21.6% of the vote, losing to incumbent Quinto Martini, a Progressive Conservative. Two years later, he was elected as an alderman in Ward 4. He served in this post until 1970. During his time as alderman, he also retired from his work at Stelco.

In 1970, he ran for a seat on the Board of Control, but was unsuccessful. Following his defeat, he assumed the Chairmanship of the Hamilton Region Conservation Authority and stayed in that position for a decade.

In 1980, he defeated incumbent mayor, Jack MacDonald. He served until 1982, when he was defeated by Bob Morrow.

In 1985, he was appointed as alderman for Ward 3 in order to fill a vacancy.
