= Ken Seiling =

Long-serving retired regional chair in Canada

Ken Seiling is a retired Canadian politician, most notable for serving as Regional Chair of the Regional Municipality of Waterloo from 1985 to 2018. He served as mayor of the lower-tier municipality of Woolwich in the 1970s. Notable policy legacies of Seiling include the controversial "countryside line", a municipally managed greenbelt and the development of Waterloo's light rail transit system, which was a defining topic in the 2014 election. He also helped spearhead action in the late 1990s and early 2000s to ban smoking indoors in Waterloo businesses. After 2014, Seiling was selected to co-lead a provincial report into efficiency and reform in municipal regional government.

== Biography and Electoral History ==
Ken Seiling was born between 1946 and 1948. In the 1970s, he entered municipal politics as a councillor in the municipality of Woolwich. He later served as mayor of Woolwich, as his grandfather had at some time before him.

Seiling received post-secondary education at Wilfrid Laurier University, McMaster University and the University of Toronto, before serving as a teacher in Waterloo Region and then becoming a museum director at Wellington County Museum and Archives.

As of 2021, he has five children and eleven grandchildren.

Seiling served two years as a councillor and then nine years as Mayor of Woolwich. He was first elected by council as Regional Chair in 1985, followed by elections in 1988, 1991 and 1994, and following reorganization of Waterloo County into a two-tier municipality, served as its regional chair after winning direct elections in 1997, 2000, 2003, 2006, 2010 and 2014.

Before serving as Regional Chair, Seiling also served as head of the Waterloo Regional Police Commission. In his 1985 race to replace retiring chair James Gray, many other municipal politicians were considered as possible contenders, but he was elected, likely by a coalition of rural councillors.

== Career as Chair ==
Seiling served as the chair of the Mayors and Regional Chairs of Ontario.

During Seiling's time as chair, the Region grew from approximately 330,000 residents to over 500,000.

In 1990, the Regional Council approved the construction of a new regional headquarters, which resulted in Seiling being named as a respondent in a 1992 lawsuit by a company that answered the request for proposals that did not receive the contract.

In 2000, Seiling urged the regional council to reject amalgamation into a single-tier municipality, citing the length of the amalgamation period could be better spent on finding reforms within the two-tier system. Seiling was not willing to commit regional staff resources to analysis of reform, creating internal controversy with other municipal politicians.

In 2001, Waterloo created one of Canada's strictest municipal smoking bans.

In 2002, in the aftermath of the Walkerton water crisis, Seiling endorsed regional/county control of water services, causing controversies within Waterloo Region as lower-tier politicians argued in favour of more local control.

In 2007, Seiling disputed an assertion by some Six Nations leaders that approval of traditional chiefs (via a development authority) of the Six Nations were required before construction could occur within the area in Waterloo that coincide with the Haldimand Tract.

In 2007, Seiling promoted intensification through transit policy, proposing rapid transit funding and alternatives to car-based travel. These remarks, given to then-leader of the Progressive Conservative Party of Ontario, John Tory at a Progressive Conservative youth event.

In the 2010 regional plan, the Region continued a relatively uncommon 2003 policy of limiting the amount of land available for greenfield development through "countryside lines" creating limits on countryside development, essentially a greenbelt. This led to an appeal by developers to the Ontario Municipal Board, which sided with the developers against the Region, which then sued, challenging the government agency's decision as unreasonable. In 2015, a compromise between the original 90 hectare Regional greenfield allocation and developer 1,053 hectare request was reached, with 450 hectares being made available.

In 2013, after failure to comply with regional recommendations, the Region seized Sand Hills Housing Co-op, placing it under regional control, following authority granted by the Ontario Housing Act to do so to protect co-op members against mismanagement.

In 2013, Seiling opposed Woolwich's municipal government's decision to permit construction of a casino within the municipality, citing costs to regional police services and social services. The casino plans were ultimately shelved after the gaming commission stipulated that construction would have to occur specifically at an already existing horse racetrack.

In 2014, Seiling helped lead a local consortium that lobbied the Government of Ontario to increase frequency of GO Train service to the region to 15-minute service. The Ontario government responded with a commitment to rail electrification which would facilitate moving toward a level of service termed "all-day, two-way GO", without committing to a specific timeframe for completion.

In 2015, after advocacy on the part of Seiling among others, the provincial government committed to being construction on expansion of Highway 7 between Waterloo and Guelph, which had been planned since 1989.

== Post-retirement ==
After retirement, the Waterloo Region Museum was named after Ken Seiling as a tribute to his service.

Seiling was selected alongside former Ontario Deputy Minister Michael Fenn to lead a report on the efficiency of regional government in Ontario, commonly understood to be about exploring converting some two-tier municipalities into single-tier municipalities. The province ultimately decided not to assert amalgamation on regional governments, keeping the report confidential, and Seiling expressed disappointment more recommendations were not adopted.
