= Bob Morrow =

Canadian politician (1946–2018)

Robert Morrow UE
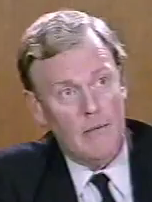

52nd Mayor of Hamilton
- In office 1982–2000
- Preceded by: William Powell
- Succeeded by: Robert E. Wade

Personal details
- Born: Robert Maxwell Morrow; August 9, 1946 Hamilton, Ontario, Canada
- Died: February 4, 2018 (aged 71) Hamilton, Ontario, Canada
- Party: Independent
- Spouse: Guay Bayliss (m. 1977)
- Profession: Politician; organist

Robert Maxwell Morrow UE (August 9, 1946 – February 4, 2018) was a Canadian politician who served as 52nd mayor of Hamilton from 1982 to 2000. He was the longest-serving mayor in the city's history.

== Political career ==
Born in Hamilton, Morrow first won election in 1968 as alderman for Ward One. However, he was disqualified because his name was not on the voter's list. In a subsequent by-election, his father, George Morrow, secured the seat. Morrow ran again in 1970, winning without legal difficulty. In 1972, he won a seat on the Board of Control, a body that was elected citywide. In the following three elections, he placed first in the multi-candidate race, automatically becoming deputy mayor. When the board was abolished in 1980, Morrow temporarily left municipal politics. He unsuccessfully ran as a Progressive Conservative candidate in the 1981 provincial election in Hamilton West, losing to provincial Liberal leader Stuart Smith.

In 1982, Morrow won the first of six mayoral elections, defeating incumbent William Powell. His last few victories were only challenged by minor candidates, with Morrow regularly receiving in excess of 75 per cent of the vote. After Morrow refused to proclaim Hamilton's first pride day in 1991, the Ontario Human Rights Commission ruled that Morrow had discriminated against gays and lesbians, and he was fined $5,000 and forced to issue a proclamation in 1995. In 2000, following the amalgamation of the City of Hamilton with neighbouring towns, Morrow lost the election to Ancaster mayor Robert E. Wade. While Morrow again won the old City of Hamilton, he did not win the newly added boroughs.

He was appointed as a citizenship judge in 2004, and he served two terms, retiring in May 2010. On February 7, 2014, Hamilton City Council appointed Bob Morrow as interim councillor for Ward 3 after the death of Councillor Bernie Morelli. To avoid any conflict or confusion, Morrow sent a letter to council saying that he would not seek the seat in the city's October 2014 election. Matthew Green was elected the new Ward 3 councillor following the fall 2014 election.

He served as the organist and head of the senior choir of St. Patrick's Roman Catholic Church in downtown Hamilton.
