= Robert E. Wade =

Canadian politician (1933–2023)

53rd Mayor of Hamilton
- In office 2000–2003
- Preceded by: Bob Morrow
- Succeeded by: Larry Di Ianni

Mayor of Ancaster
- In office 1984–2000
- Preceded by: Ann Sloat
- Succeeded by: Position abolished

Personal details
- Born: August 25, 1933
- Died: May 4, 2023 (aged 89)
- Party: Independent
- Spouse: Ida Wade

Robert E. Wade (August 25, 1933 – May 4, 2023) was a Canadian politician who served as the 53rd mayor of Hamilton, Ontario, from 2000 to 2003.

Wade moved to Ancaster from London, Ontario, in 1960 after his employer London Life Insurance Company transferred him. He was first elected to the Ancaster Town Council in 1978, and served for 22 years, including 16 as the mayor. He was the last mayor of Ancaster before amalgamation.

He was married to Ida (Blanchard) Wade, with whom he had three daughters.

== 2000 City of Hamilton Election ==
Bob Wade entered the new city of Hamilton's mayoralty race and was not expected to win, as the incumbent of the old City Of Hamilton Bob Morrow had been Hamilton's longest-serving mayor and had a strong electoral base. On election night it was revealed that over 50 per cent of the residents of Ancaster had voted in the municipal election and 80 per cent of them voted for Wade.

Wade's win was as much a result of Morrow's supporters staying home as it was from his supporters coming out in droves.

After serving one term in office, Wade retired from public life after 25 years.

== Death ==
Wade died on May 4, 2023, at the age of 89.
